= Rodgers and Hart =

American songwriting partnership

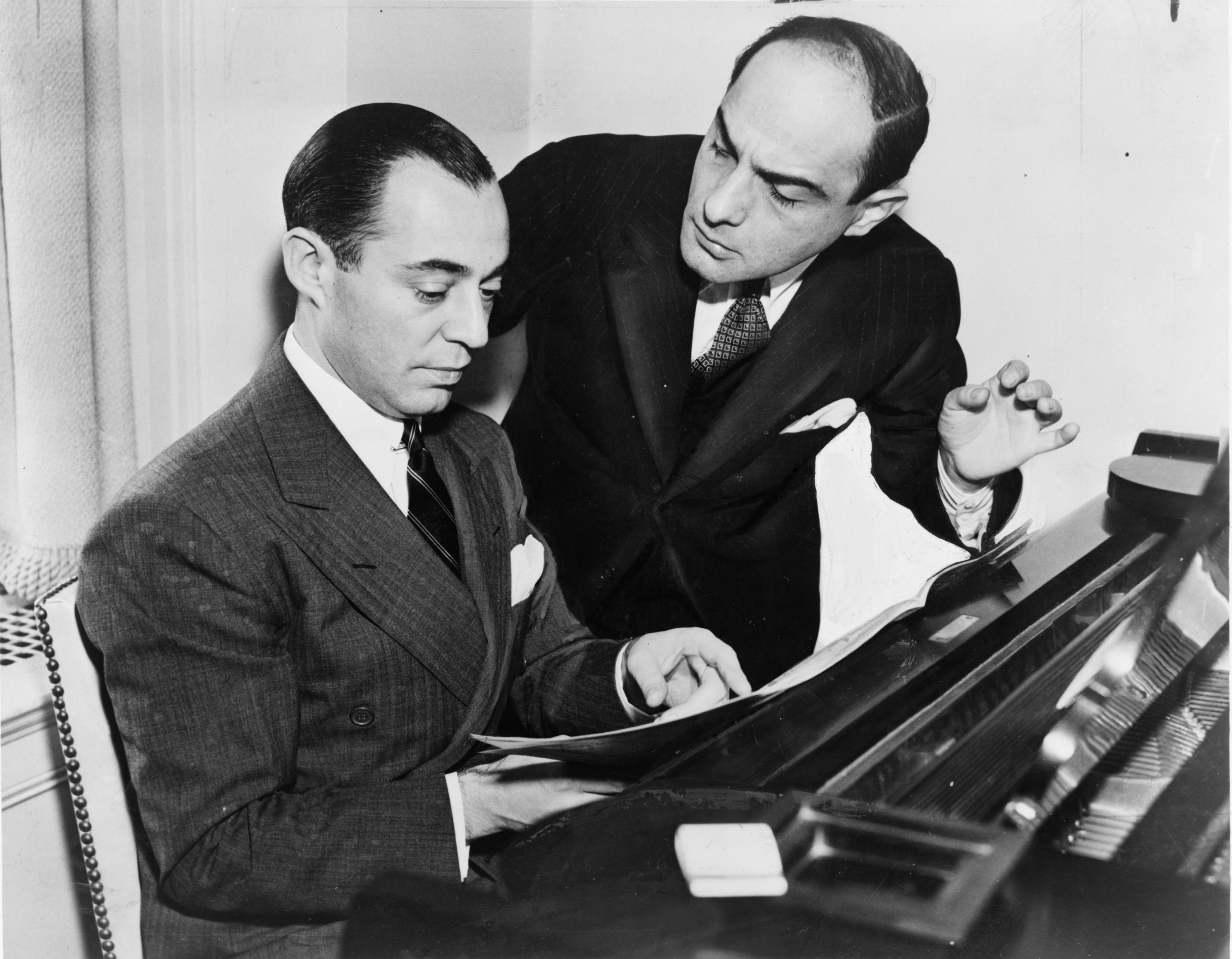
Rodgers (left) and Hart in 1936

Rodgers and Hart were an American songwriting partnership between composer Richard Rodgers (1902–1979) and the lyricist Lorenz Hart (1895–1943). They worked together on 28 stage musicals and more than 500 songs from 1919 until Hart's death in 1943. Many of their songs are classics of the Great American Songbook.

== History ==
Richard Rodgers and Lorenz Hart were introduced in 1919 while Rodgers was in high school and Hart had already graduated from Columbia University. One of their first collaborations was at Columbia in the 1920 Varsity Show, Fly With Me, which also involved Rodgers' future collaborator Oscar Hammerstein II. After writing together for several years they produced their first successful Broadway musical, The Garrick Gaieties, in 1925, which introduced their hit song "Manhattan" and led to a series of successful musicals and films. They quickly became among the most popular songwriters in America, and from 1925 to 1931 had fifteen scores featured on Broadway. In the early 1930s they moved to Hollywood, where they created several popular songs for film, such as "Isn't It Romantic?" and "Lover", before returning to Broadway in 1935 with Billy Rose's Jumbo. From 1935 to Hart's death in 1943, they wrote a string of highly regarded Broadway musicals, most of which were hits.

Many of their stage musicals from the late 1930s were made into films, including On Your Toes (1936) and Babes in Arms (1937), though rarely with their scores intact. Pal Joey (1940), termed their masterpiece, has a book by The New Yorker writer John O'Hara. O'Hara adapted his own short stories for the show, which featured a title character who is a heel. Critic Brooks Atkinson wrote in his review, "Although it is expertly done, how can you draw sweet water from a foul well?" When the show was revived in 1952 audiences had learned to accept darker material, due in large part to Rodgers' work with Oscar Hammerstein. The new production had a considerably longer run than the original and was now considered a classic by critics. Atkinson, reviewing the revival, wrote that the musical "renews confidence in the professionalism of the theatre."

== Analysis ==
Time devoted a cover story to Rodgers and Hart on September 26, 1938. The magazine said that their success "rests on a commercial instinct that most of their rivals have apparently ignored". The article also said their "spirit of adventure." "As Rodgers and Hart see it, what was killing musicomedy was its sameness, its tameness, its eternal rhyming of June with moon."

Their songs have long been favorites of cabaret singers and jazz artists. Ella Fitzgerald recorded Ella Fitzgerald Sings the Rodgers & Hart Songbook and Andrea Marcovicci based one of her cabaret acts entirely on Rodgers and Hart songs.

In their era musicals were revue-like and librettos were little more than excuses for comic turns and music cues. Rodgers and Hart tried to raise the standard of the musical form in general. A Connecticut Yankee (1927) was based on Mark Twain's novel A Connecticut Yankee in King Arthur's Court and The Boys From Syracuse (1938) on William Shakespeare's The Comedy of Errors. They used dance significantly in their work, using the ballets of George Balanchine.

== Stage and film productions ==
- (1920) Fly With Me
- (1925) The Garrick Gaieties
- (1925) Dearest Enemy
- (1926) The Girl Friend
- (1926) Betsy
- (1926) Peggy-Ann
- (1926) The Fifth Avenue Follies
- (1926) Lido Lady
- (1926) The Garrick Gaieties (2nd Edition)
- (1927) A Connecticut Yankee
- (1927) One Dam Thing After Another
- (1928) Present Arms
- (1928) Chee-Chee
- (1928) She's My Baby
- (1929) Heads Up!
- (1930) Spring Is Here (film)
- (1930) Ever Green
- (1930) Simple Simon
- (1931) America's Sweetheart
- (1932) Love Me Tonight (film)
- (1932) The Phantom President (film)
- (1933) Hallelujah, I'm a Bum (film)
- (1935) Mississippi (film)
- (1935) Jumbo (1962 film Billy Rose's Jumbo)
- (1936) On Your Toes (1939 film)
- (1936) The Show Is On (Broadway revue with one song by Rodgers and Hart)
- (1937) Babes in Arms (1939 film)
- (1937) I'd Rather Be Right
- (1938) The Boys from Syracuse (1940 film)
- (1938) I Married an Angel (1942 film)
- (1939) Too Many Girls (1940 film)
- (1940) Higher and Higher (1943 film)
- (1940) Pal Joey (1957 film)
- (1940) Two Weeks with Pay
- (1942) By Jupiter
- (1943) A Connecticut Yankee (revised, with additional songs, their last collaboration)

== Songs ==
One of Rodgers and Hart's best known songs, "Blue Moon", was originally called "Prayer." It was to be sung by Jean Harlow in the 1934 film Hollywood Party, and was cut. Hart then wrote a new lyric, intended to be the title song for Manhattan Melodrama (1934), which was cut again. A third lyric, "The Bad in Every Man," was used in the film. At the urging of Jack Robbins, head of MGM's music publishing unit, Hart wrote a fourth lyric as a standalone song. Glen Grey and the Casa Loma Orchestra recorded it in 1936, and that version topped the charts for three weeks. Elvis Presley included a haunting version on his self-titled debut album, in 1956. It again was #1 in 1961, this time in the doo-wop style, by The Marcels. Bob Dylan included his Nashville-inflected version of the song on his Self Portrait album of 1970.

Frederick Nolan writes that "My Romance" (written for Jumbo) "features some of the most elegantly wistful lyrics...[it] is, quite simply, one of the best songs Rodgers and Hart ever wrote."

Other of their hits include "My Funny Valentine", "Falling in Love with Love", "Here In My Arms", "Mountain Greenery", "My Heart Stood Still", "The Blue Room", "Ten Cents a Dance", "Dancing on the Ceiling", "Lover", "Bewitched, Bothered and Bewildered", "Mimi", and "Have You Met Miss Jones?".

=== List of well-known songs ===
- Dorothy Hart and Robert Kimball, ed. (1995). The Complete Lyrics of Lorenz Hart. Da Capo Press. ISBN 0-306-80667-3.
- (1925) "Manhattan" and "Mountain Greenery" (from The Garrick Gaieties)
- (1925) "Here In My Arms" (from Dearest Enemy)
- (1926) "The Blue Room" (from The Girl Friend)
- (1927) "Thou Swell" (from A Connecticut Yankee)
- (1927) "My Heart Stood Still" (from One Dam Thing After Another)
- (1928) "You Took Advantage of Me" (from Present Arms)
- (1929) "A Ship Without a Sail" (from Me For You)
- (1930) "Yours Sincerely" and "With a Song in My Heart" (from Spring Is Here)
- (1930) "Ten Cents a Dance" and "Dancing on the Ceiling" (from Simple Simon)
- (1931) "I've Got Five Dollars" (from America's Sweetheart)
- (1932) "Lover", "Mimi", and "Isn't It Romantic?", (from Love Me Tonight)
- (1932) "You Are Too Beautiful" (from Hallelujah, I'm a Bum)
- (1934) "Blue Moon"
- (1935) "Little Girl Blue", "The Most Beautiful Girl in the World" (from Jumbo)
- (1935) "It's Easy to Remember" (from Mississippi)
- (1936) "There's a Small Hotel", and "Glad to Be Unhappy" (from On Your Toes)
- (1937) "Where or When", "I Wish I Were in Love Again", "My Funny Valentine", "Johnny One Note", and "The Lady Is a Tramp" (from Babes in Arms)
- (1937) "Have You Met Miss Jones?" (from I'd Rather Be Right)
- (1938) "This Can't Be Love", "Falling in Love with Love", and "Sing For Your Supper" (from The Boys from Syracuse)
- (1938) "Spring Is Here" and "I'll Tell the Man in the Street" (from I Married an Angel)
- (1939) "I Didn't Know What Time It Was", "I Like to Recognize the Tune", "Give It Back to the Indians" (from Too Many Girls)
- (1940) "It Never Entered My Mind" (from Higher and Higher)
- (1940) "Bewitched, Bothered and Bewildered", "I Could Write a Book", and "Zip" (from Pal Joey)
- (1942) "Wait Till You See Her", "Nobody's Heart Belongs to Me", "Ev'rything I've Got" (from By Jupiter)
- (1943) "To Keep My Love Alive" (from A Connecticut Yankee)

== Other works ==
- All Points West (1937), a monodrama commissioned by Paul Whiteman

== In popular culture ==
The songwriting partnership of Rodgers and Hart was fictionalized in the 1948 film Words and Music, notably eliding various aspects of Hart's life.

The 2025 film Blue Moon depicts Hart reflecting on his long collaboration with Rodgers, as overshadowed by the successful opening night of Oklahoma! in 1943.

== See also ==
- Herbert Fields
- List of songwriter collaborations
- Rodgers and Hammerstein
