= Lew Fields =

American actor, comedian, vaudeville star, theatre manager, and producer (1867–1941)

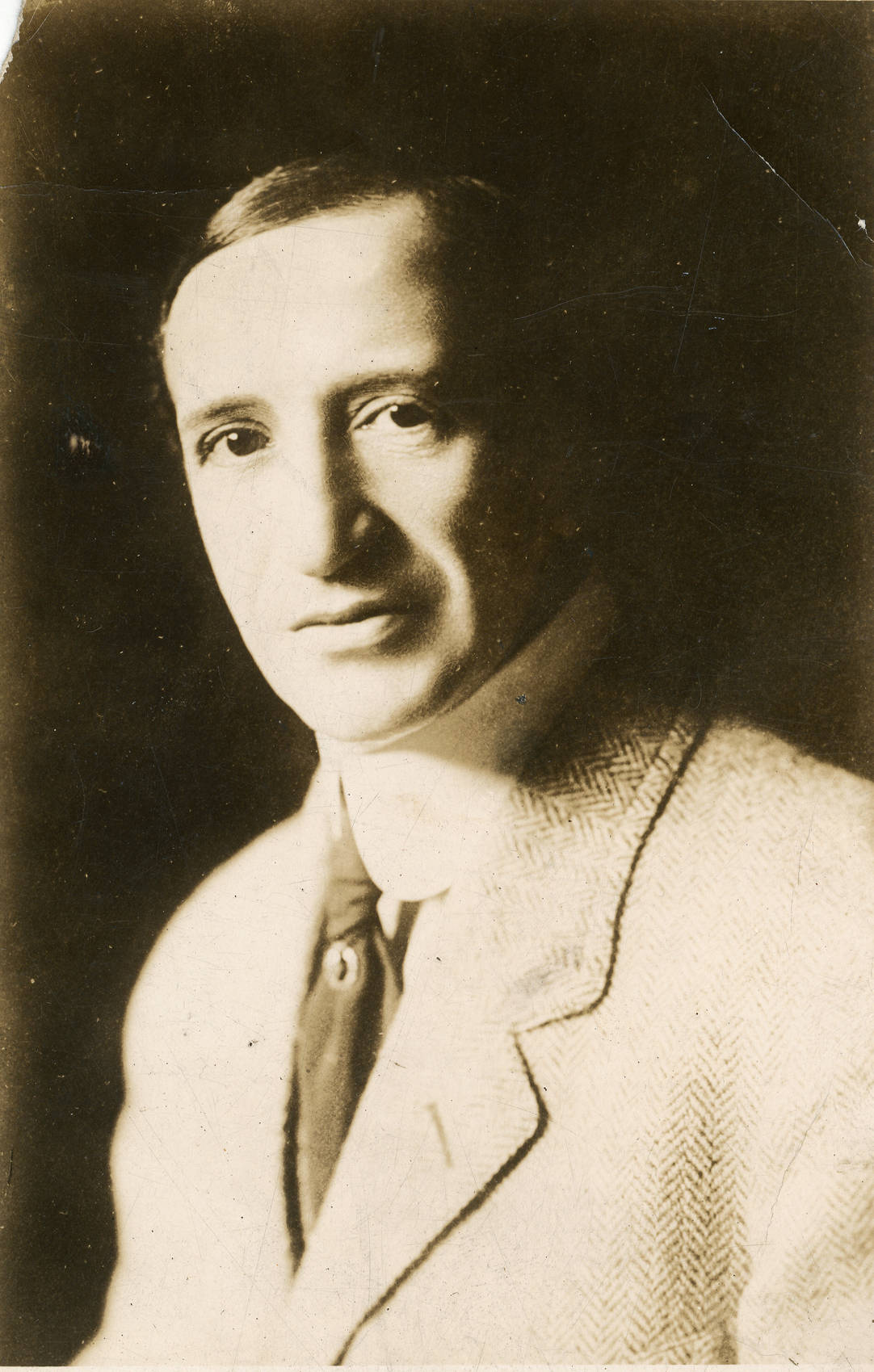
- Fields in 1912
- Born: Moses Schoenfeld; January 1867; Poland
- Died: July 20, 1941 (aged 74); Beverly Hills, California, U.S.
- Occupations: Actor, comedian
- Years active: 1913–1940
- Spouse: Rose Harris (1893–1941, his death)
- Children: Dorothy Fields; Herbert Fields; Joseph Fields

Lew Fields (born Moses Schoenfeld, January 1867 – July 20, 1941) was an American actor, comedian, vaudeville star, theatre manager, and producer. Partnering with Joe Weber, they formed the comedy double-act of Weber and Fields. He also produced shows on his own and starred in comedy films.

== Biography ==
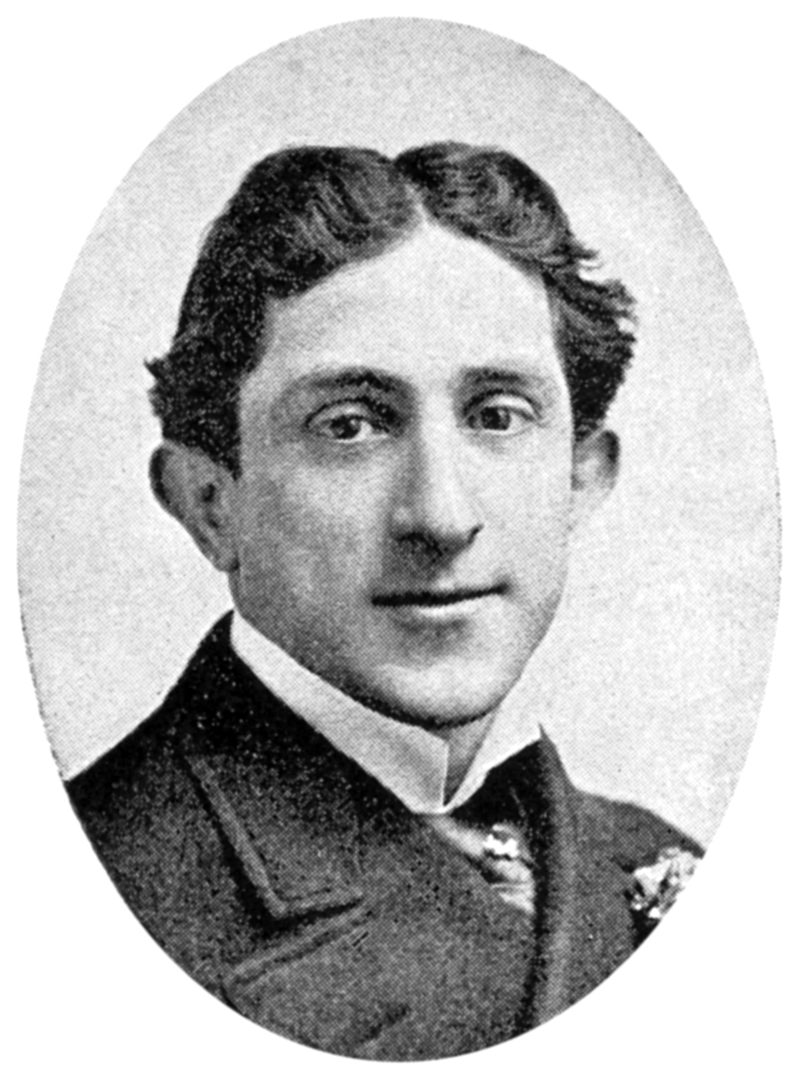
Joe Weber in 1901

Lew Fields was born Moses Schoenfeld to Polish-Jewish parents. He was half of the great comic duo Weber and Fields, with Joe Weber. They performed in museums, circuses, and variety houses in New York City. The young men had a "Dutch act" in which both portrayed German immigrants. Several recordings of their act were made and released as on records.

In the case of Weber and Fields (or "Mike and Meyer" as their characters were known) and many of the other acts of this genre, this often involved stereotyping by dress and behavior, as well as comedic and often sympathetic portrayals of the characters' attempts to fit into American society. "Crafty schemes" of "making it big" in America, as well as the attempts of mere survival of immigrant poverty in America, were written into the script of these acts. A typical "Mike and Meyer" routine involved Mike, the short and clever one, unsuccessfully trying to coach Meyer, the tall and simple one, in a scheme to get them a free lunch at a working-class saloon.

The two toured successfully for many years, becoming one of the most popular and profitable acts in vaudeville. In 1896, the partners opened the Weber and Fields' Broadway Music Hall, where they produced very successful burlesques of popular Broadway shows. In the music hall's casts were some of the greatest performers and comics on the American stage at that time, including Lillian Russell, Ross and Fenton, Fay Templeton, and DeWolf Hopper. Some of their routines were Pousse Cafe, Hurly Burly, Whirl-I-Gig, Fiddle-Dee-Dee, Hoity-Toity, Twirly Whirly, and Whoop-de-Doo.

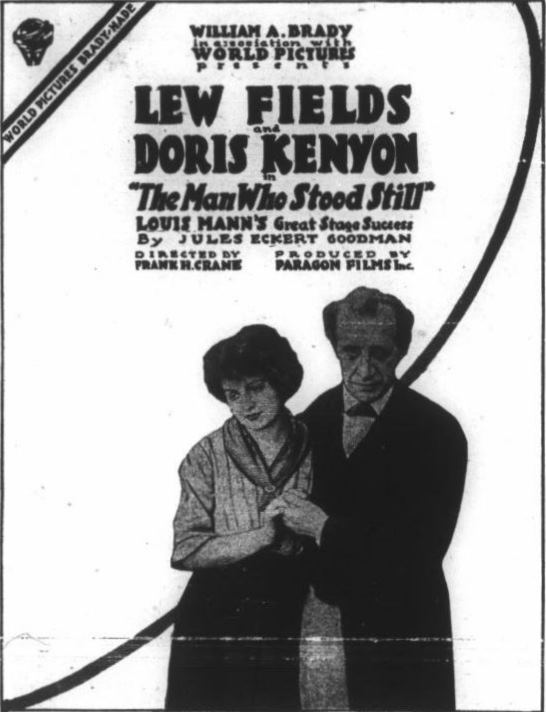
Advertisement for The Man Who Stood Still (1916)

The duo separated in 1904, and Weber took over operations at the music hall. Fields went on to produce many musicals. When Fields starred in the 1911 stage comedy, The Hen-Pecks, one of the supporting comedians in the cast was Vernon Castle, who went on to become a famous ballroom dancer. Fields then produced Hanky Panky which ran from August 5, 1912 through November 2, 1912 featuring songs by Irving Berlin and Ballard MacDonald. In 1913 Fields produced and starred in the Broadway musical All Aboard. In 1921, Fred Allen and Nora Bayes toured with Fields. During the tour the orchestra was conducted by 19-year-old Richard Rodgers, who, in 1920, contributed songs with lyrics by Lorenz Hart to the Lew Field's production of Poor Little Ritz Girl.

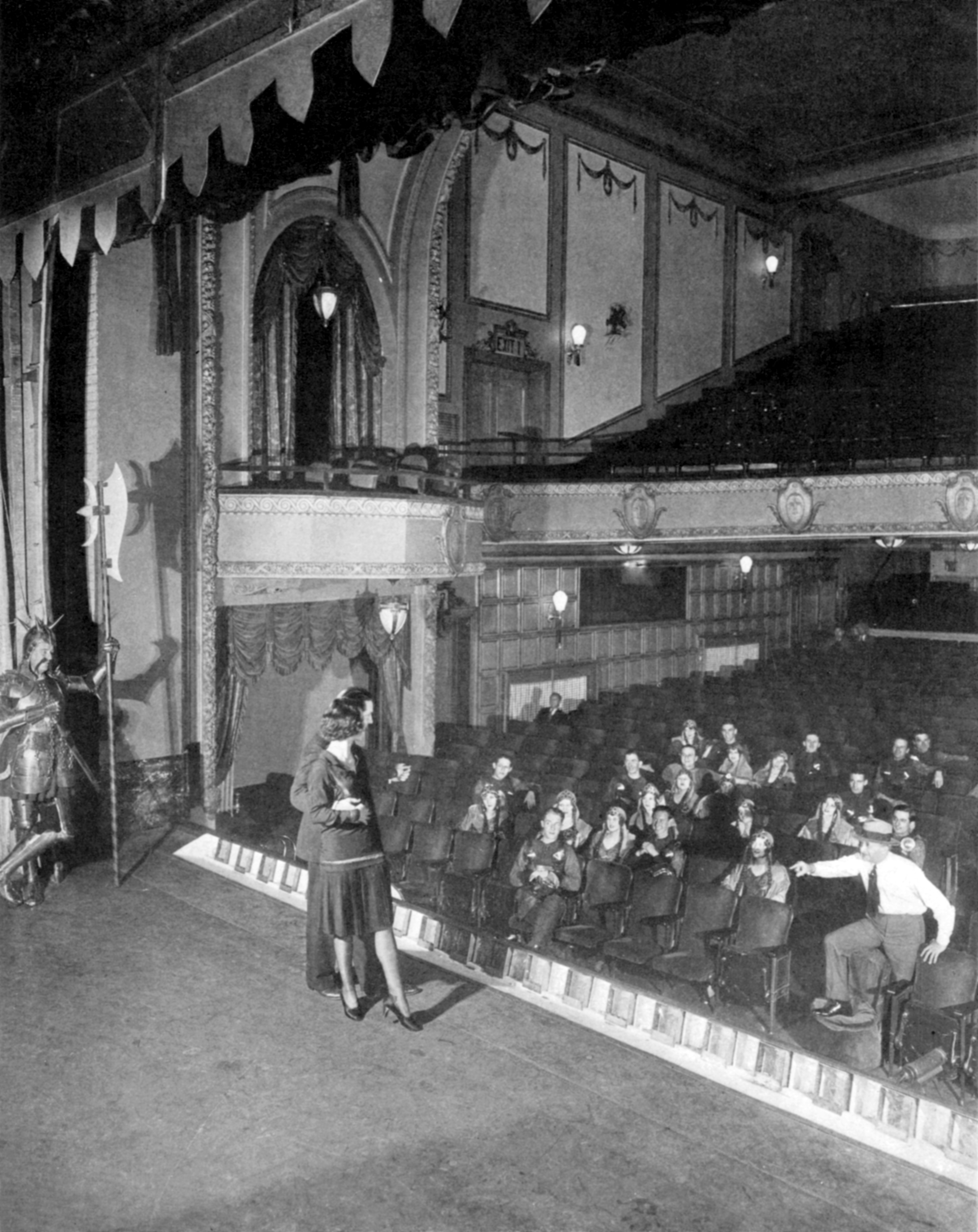
Constance Carpenter and William Gaxton, principals of the original Broadway production of Rodgers and Hart's A Connecticut Yankee, on stage at the Vanderbilt Theatre during a mid-run rehearsal of the hit musical (1928). Producer Lew Fields is seen at right, in shirtsleeves.

In 1923, Weber and Fields partnered yet again for a Lee DeForest Phonofilm sound-on-film short, where the team recreated their famous pool hall routine. This film premiered at the Rivoli Theater in New York City on 15 April 1923. Three years later, the duo were among those supporting Will Rogers and Mary Garden on the NBC Radio Network's November 15, 1926 debut broadcast. Their own NBC series followed in 1931.

Weber and Fields also reunited for the 27 December 1932 inaugural show at Radio City Music Hall, which proved to be the last stage appearance of the two performers as a team. In the RKO Radio Pictures film, The Story of Vernon and Irene Castle (1939), Fields appeared as himself, re-enacting a slapstick comedy scene from The Hen-Pecks. They gave a cameo performance performing their "casino" routine in the 1940 movie Lillian Russell.

Lew Fields died in Beverly Hills, California on July 20, 1941.

== Personal life ==
Fields was the father of Dorothy, Herbert and Joseph, all of whom enjoyed theatrical careers of their own. Fields was Jewish.

== Legacy ==
The backstage hostility in Neil Simon's play and film The Sunshine Boys is reportedly based on the team of Smith and Dale, not Weber and Fields.

== Filmography ==
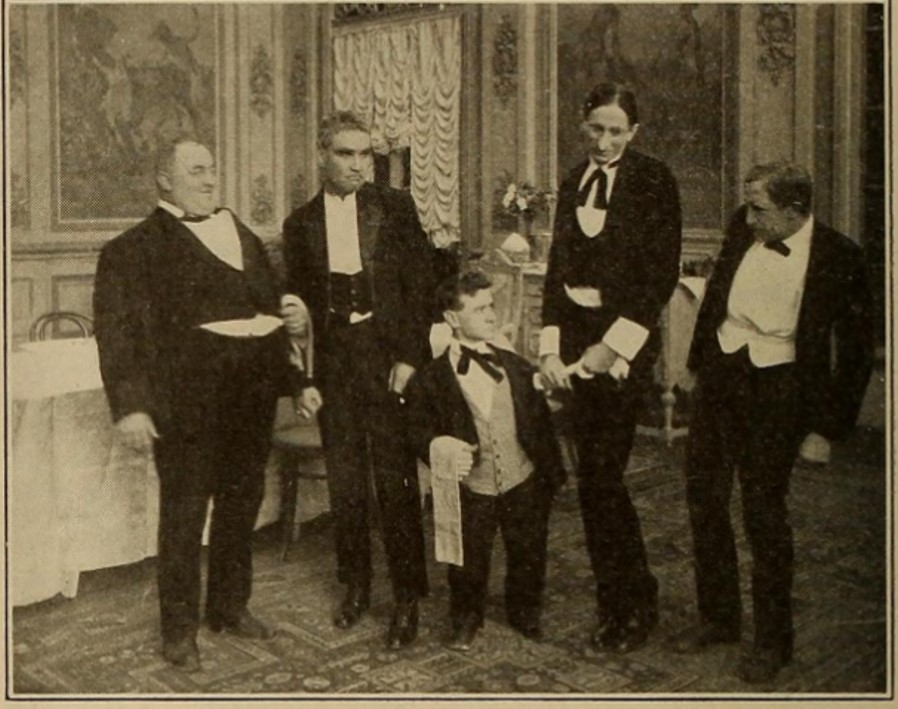
Fields (far right) in his feature length debut Old Dutch, based on his 1909 play of the same name

- Old Dutch (1915)
- The Man Who Stood Still (1916)
- The Barker (1917)
- The Corner Grocer (1917)
- Friendly Enemies (1925)
- Two Flaming Youths (1927)
- Blossoms on Broadway (1937)
- The Story of Vernon and Irene Castle (1939)
