= Vivienne Segal =

American actress and singer (1897–1992)

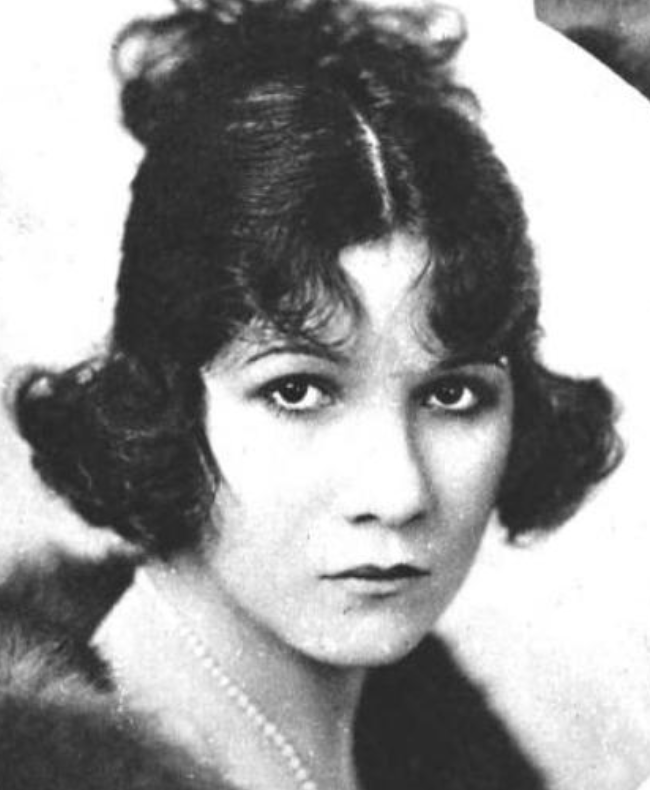
- Vivienne Segal, from a 1920 publication
- Born: April 19, 1897; Philadelphia, Pennsylvania, U.S.
- Died: December 29, 1992 (aged 95); Beverly Hills, California, U.S.
- Occupations: Singer, actress
- Years active: 1912–1966
- Spouses: Robert Ames (m. 1923; div. 1926) Hubbell Robinson, Jr. (m. 1950; died 1974)
- Awards: Donaldson Award

Vivienne Sonia Segal (April 19, 1897 – December 29, 1992) was an American actress and singer.

== Early years ==
Segal was born on April 19, 1897 in Philadelphia, Pennsylvania. She was the elder daughter of Jewish parents Bernhard Segal, a physician, and Paula (née Hahn) Segal, who encouraged Vivienne and her sisters Vera and Louise to seek careers in show business. Her obituary in The Guardian reported that her father "underwrote a local opera company in order to give her the chance to sing." She studied singing with Estelle Liebling, the voice teacher of Beverly Sills.

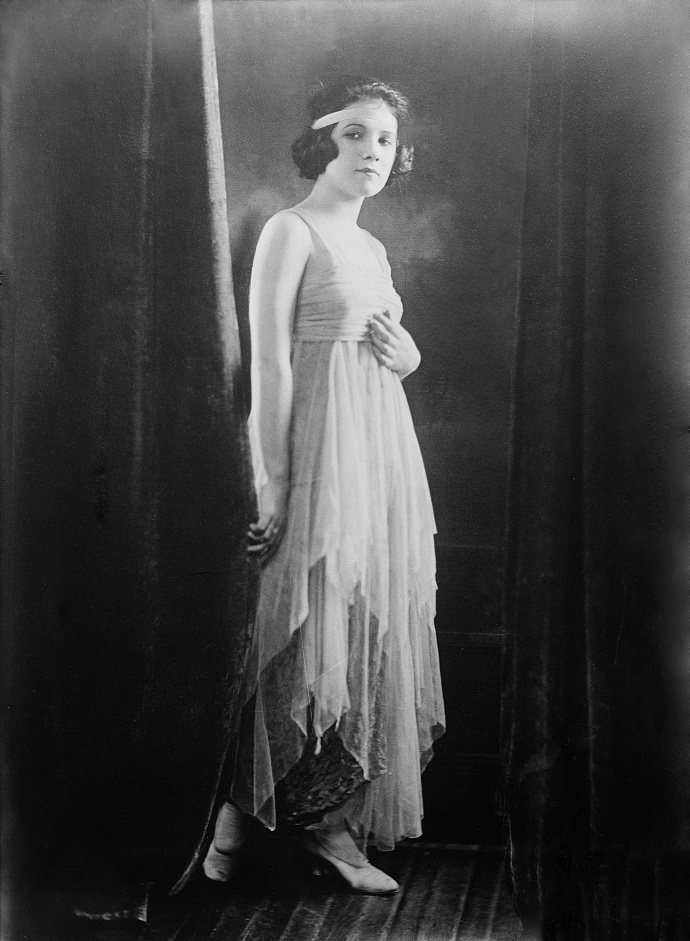
Vivienne Segal in 1915, standing in a sequined gown

== Career ==
Segal's career began when she was 15 years old and began performing with the Philadelphia Operatic Society. Her Broadway debut came in The Blue Paradise (1915), a production that was underwritten by her father. In 1924 and 1925, she was a member of the Ziegfeld Follies. She was also a performer on the CBS Radio program Accordiana in 1934.

Segal may be best remembered for creating the role of Vera Simpson in Richard Rodgers and Lorenz Hart's Pal Joey and introducing the song "Bewitched, Bothered and Bewildered". Pal Joey opened at the Ethel Barrymore Theatre December 25, 1940, with a cast that included Gene Kelly and June Havoc. She also starred as Morgan LeFay in the Rodgers and Hart revival of A Connecticut Yankee in 1942. One of Lorenz Hart's songs, "To Keep My Love Alive", was written specifically for her in this show.

Because the 1940 Pal Joey production went unrecorded, a studio cast was assembled in 1950 to record the musical. In 2003, this recording was reissued on CD by Columbia Broadway Masterworks in a release featuring the full show's numbers plus two bonus tracks: Harold Lang singing "I Could Write a Book" (from the CBS TV show Shower of Stars) and Segal singing "Bewitched, Bothered and Bewildered" on the CBS Radio show Stage Struck, interviewed by Mike Wallace recalling Hart's promise to write her a show. In 1952, she played in Pal Joey again when it was revived on Broadway.

Vivienne Segal retired from acting in 1966 following a guest appearance on Perry Mason as Pauline Thorsen in "The Case of the Tsarina's Tiara."

== Awards ==
In 1952, Segal received a Donaldson Award in the Best Performance-Actress (Musical Division) category for her performance in the revival of Pal Joey.

== Personal life and death ==
Segal and actor Robert Ames eloped in 1923 but divorced three years later. In 1950, she married television executive Hubbell Robinson Jr.

According to composer Stephen Sondheim, Segal was a “canasta crony” of Sondheim's mother Etta Janet Fox (“Foxy”) Sondheim.

Segal died in Beverly Hills, California of heart failure on December 29, 1992, aged 95. She was interred in the Westwood Village Memorial Park Cemetery in Los Angeles.

== Musical theater ==
- 1915 The Blue Paradise
- 1917 My Lady's Glove
- 1917 Miss 1917
- 1918 Oh, Lady! Lady!!
- 1919 The Little Whopper
- 1921 A Dangerous Maid (as a replacement)
- 1922 The Yankee Princess
- 1923 Adrienne
- 1924 Ziegfeld Follies
- 1925 Ziegfeld Follies
- 1925 Florida Girl
- 1926 Castles in the Air
- 1926 The Desert Song
- 1928 The Three Musketeers
- 1931 The Chocolate Soldier
- 1938 I Married an Angel
- 1940 Pal Joey
- 1943 A Connecticut Yankee, Broadway revival
- 1947 Music in My Heart
- 1950 Great to Be Alive!
- 1952 Pal Joey, Broadway revival

== Films ==
Year	Title	Role	Notes
1929	Will You Remember?		Short.
1930	Song of the West	Virginia	Filmed in two-color Technicolor. Lost film.
1930	Bride of the Regiment	Countess Anna-Marie	Filmed in two-color Technicolor. Lost film.
1930	Golden Dawn	Dawn	Filmed in two-color Technicolor. Survives in black and white.
1930	Viennese Nights	Elsa Hofner	Filmed in two-color Technicolor. Survives in color.
1933	Fifi	Fifi	Short.
1934	The Cat and the Fiddle	Odette	Filmed in black and white with Technicolor finale.
1934	Soup for Nuts	Prima Donna	Short.

== Selected television appearances ==
- Alfred Hitchcock Presents, 1960, season 5, episode 38: "Hooked" as Gladys
- Alfred Hitchcock Presents, 1962, season 7, episode 24: "Apex" as Clara Shorup

== Sources ==
- Sies, Luther F. Encyclopedia of American Radio: 1920-1960. Jefferson, North Carolina: McFarland, 2000. ISBN 0-7864-0452-3
