= Give It Back to the Indians =

Song
- Published: 1939
- Songwriter: Lorenz Hart
- Composer: Richard Rodgers

"Give It Back to the Indians" is a show tune from the Rodgers and Hart musical Too Many Girls (1939), where it was introduced by Mary Jane Walsh.

The song is about the island of Manhattan, and the title alludes to its purchase from the Native Americans by Peter Minuit in 1626.

The song was not used in the film version of Too Many Girls (1940).

== In culture ==
Edward Teller claimed that Robert Oppenheimer said "Give it back to the Indians" regarding what should be done with Los Alamos. This line was used in the film Oppenheimer (film) as being said to Harry S. Truman.

== Notable recordings ==
- Ella Fitzgerald - Ella Fitzgerald Sings the Rodgers & Hart Songbook (1956)
- Nancy Andrews - Too Many Girls (produced by Ben Bagley) (1988)
