= Chee-Chee (musical) =

1928 American musical play

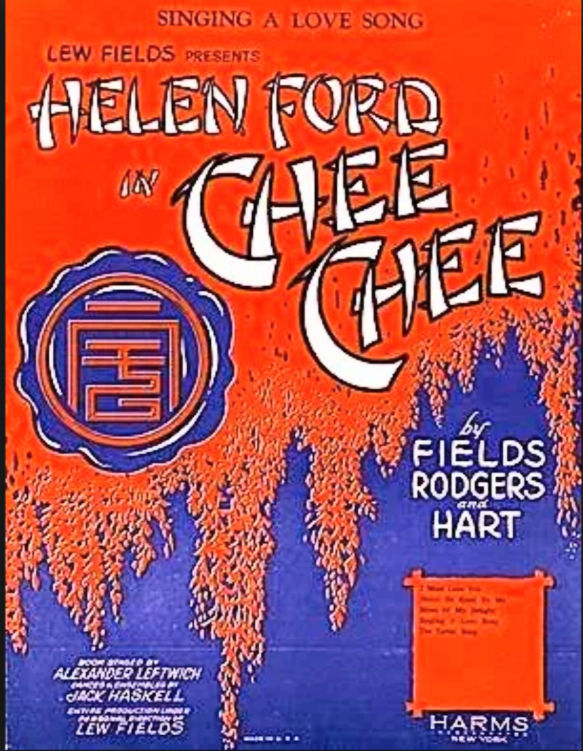
- Original theater poster of 1928
- Music: Richard Rodgers
- Lyrics: Lorenz Hart
- Book: The Son of the Grand Eunuch, by Charles Pettit
- Setting: China
- Premiere: September 25, 1928: Mansfield Theatre
- Productions: 1928 Broadway; 2003 14th Street Y, Manhattan

Chee-Chee is a musical by Richard Rodgers and Lorenz Hart based on the 1927 book, The Son of the Grand Eunuch, by Charles Pettit. Chee-Chee opened on Broadway September 25, 1928, and the show closed after 31 performances.

In 1963 vocalist Betty Comden released an album that included some of the songs from the musical.

== Synopsis ==
In 1928 Herbert Fields wrote a libretto based on Pettit's book in which the Grand Eunuch's son, Li-Pi, and his wife, Chee-Chee, are forced into exile when the Grand Eunuch announces his plan for Li-Pi to become a eunuch and take his father's place as the Grand Eunuch. Chee-Chee is captured and rescued, and Li-Pi is captured and rescued, and finally the musical ends happily.

== Musical Numbers ==
Two acts, seven scenes.

Act I

Scene I: A Corridor in the Palace of the Holy Emperor, Son of Heaven, in the Violet Town of Peking

- We're Men of Brains - Eunuchs
- I Am a Prince - Prince Tao-Tee
- In a Great Big Way - Li-Li-Wee
- The Most Majestic of Domestic Officials (Entrance of the Grand Eunuch) - Ensemble
- Holy of Holies - Li-Pi-Siao, Li-Li-Wee
- Her Hair Is Black as Licorice (Food Solo) - Li-Pi-Siao
- Dear, Oh Dear - Chee-Chee, Li-Pi-Tchou
- Await Your Love (Concubines' Song) - Li-Pi-Siao, Miss Smile of a Rose, Ensemble
- Joy Is Mine - Li-Pi-Tchou
- I Wake at Morning - Li-Pi-Tchou
- Grovel to Earth (Chee-Chee's First Entrance) - Chee-Chee
- Just a Little Thing - Li-Pi-Tchou, Chee-Chee
- You Are Both Agreed (Finaletto Scene 1) - Li-Pi-Siao, Li-Pi-Tchou, Chee-Chee

Scene II: The Road to the Future

- I Must Love You - Chee-Chee, Li-Pi-Tchou
- Owl Song - A Very Narrow Minded Owl

Scene III: A Wayside Tavern

- I Bow a Glad Good Day (Tavern Opening) - Innkeeper, Li-Pi-Siao, Ensemble
- Better Be Good to Me - Li-Li-Wee, Prince Tao-Tee
- The Tartar Song - Tartar Chief, Ensemble
- Chee-Chee's Second Entrance - Chee-Chee
- Finale (Act I)

Act II

Scene I: A Forest

- Khonghouse Song - Li-Pi-Tchou, Ensemble
- Sleep, Weary Head - Chee-Chee
- Singing a Love Song - Tartar Chief, Ensemble

Scene II: Visiting Day at the Monastery of Celestial Clouds

- Monastery Opening
- Chinese Dance
- Living Buddha (Impassive Buddha) - The Grand Prior
- Moon of My Delight - Li-Li-Wee, Prince Tao-Tee

Scene III: The Gallery of Torments

Scene IV: The Palace

- Finale Ultimo

== See also ==
- Rodgers and Hart
