= My Heart Stood Still =

1927 popular song

- Sheet music, 1927

Song
- Published: 1927 by Harms, Inc.
- Genre: Pop
- Composer: Richard Rodgers
- Lyricist: Lorenz Hart

"My Heart Stood Still" is a 1927 popular song composed by Richard Rodgers, with lyrics by Lorenz Hart. It was written for the Charles Cochran revue One Dam' Thing after Another, which opened at the London Pavilion on May 19, 1927. The show starred Jessie Matthews, Douglas Byng, Lance Lister, and Richard Dolman, running for 237 performances.

== Background ==
In March 1927, Rodgers and Hart had traveled to Paris from London to meet with the arranger Robert Russell Bennett, to try to persuade him to orchestrate the songs for their upcoming London revue, One Dam' Thing After Another. On their way back to Paris from a sightseeing expedition to Versailles, a truck nearly demolished the cab the two songwriters, along with their two female companions, were riding in. One of the young women cried out in apparent fright, “Oh! My heart stood still!” Hart instantly urged Rodgers to make a note of her exclamation as a potential song title. Rodgers jotted it down in his address book and, upon coming across the note only after they had returned to London, proceeded to construct a melody. When Rodgers played it for Hart, the lyricist loved the tune but claimed no recollection of the precipitating incident. However, he quickly produced the lyric for the song.

Rodgers and Hart later had to buy back the rights from Cochran when they wanted the song for the musical A Connecticut Yankee (1927), where it was introduced by Constance Carpenter and William Gaxton.

== Notable recordings ==
- Ben Selvin as the Broadway Nitelites, featuring vocalist Franklyn Baur (1927)
- Jessie Matthews – One Dam' Thing After Another (1927)
- Hamilton Sisters and Fordyce (Three X Sisters) – (1927) His Master's Voice Recording; London, England. Toured England with Rodgers & Hart, Bert Ambrose, and Savoy Havana Band.
- Artie Shaw and His Orchestra – Bluebird (Victor) B10125-B (1939)
- Mario Lanza – Movie Hits (1953)
- Chet Baker – (Chet Baker Sings) It Could Happen to You (1958)
- Dave Brubeck – Jazz at the Black Hawk (1956)
- Joni James – MGM X1211 Extended Play single (1956)
- Ella Fitzgerald – Ella Fitzgerald Sings the Rodgers & Hart Songbook (1956)
- Art Blakey and The Jazz Messengers – Hard Bop (1956)
- Johnny Desmond with Norman Leyden And His Orchestra – Once Upon A Time (1959)
- Oscar Peterson, The Jazz Soul of Oscar Peterson (1959)
- Alma Cogan – With You in Mind (1961)
- Barry Harris – Preminado (1961)
- Frank Sinatra – The Concert Sinatra (1963); also Sinatra 80th: Live in Concert (1995)
- Bill Evans – Time Remembered (recorded May 1963; released 1983)
- Sergio Franchi - The Songs of Richard Rodgers (1965)
- The Mamas & the Papas – The Mamas & the Papas (1966)
- The Supremes - The Supremes Sing Rodgers & Hart (1967)
- Bing Crosby – At My Time of Life (1975)
- Perry Como – Perry Como Today (1987)
- Shirley Horn – You're My Thrill (2001)
- Rod Stewart – As Time Goes By (2003)
