= Constance Carpenter =

American actress (1904–1992)

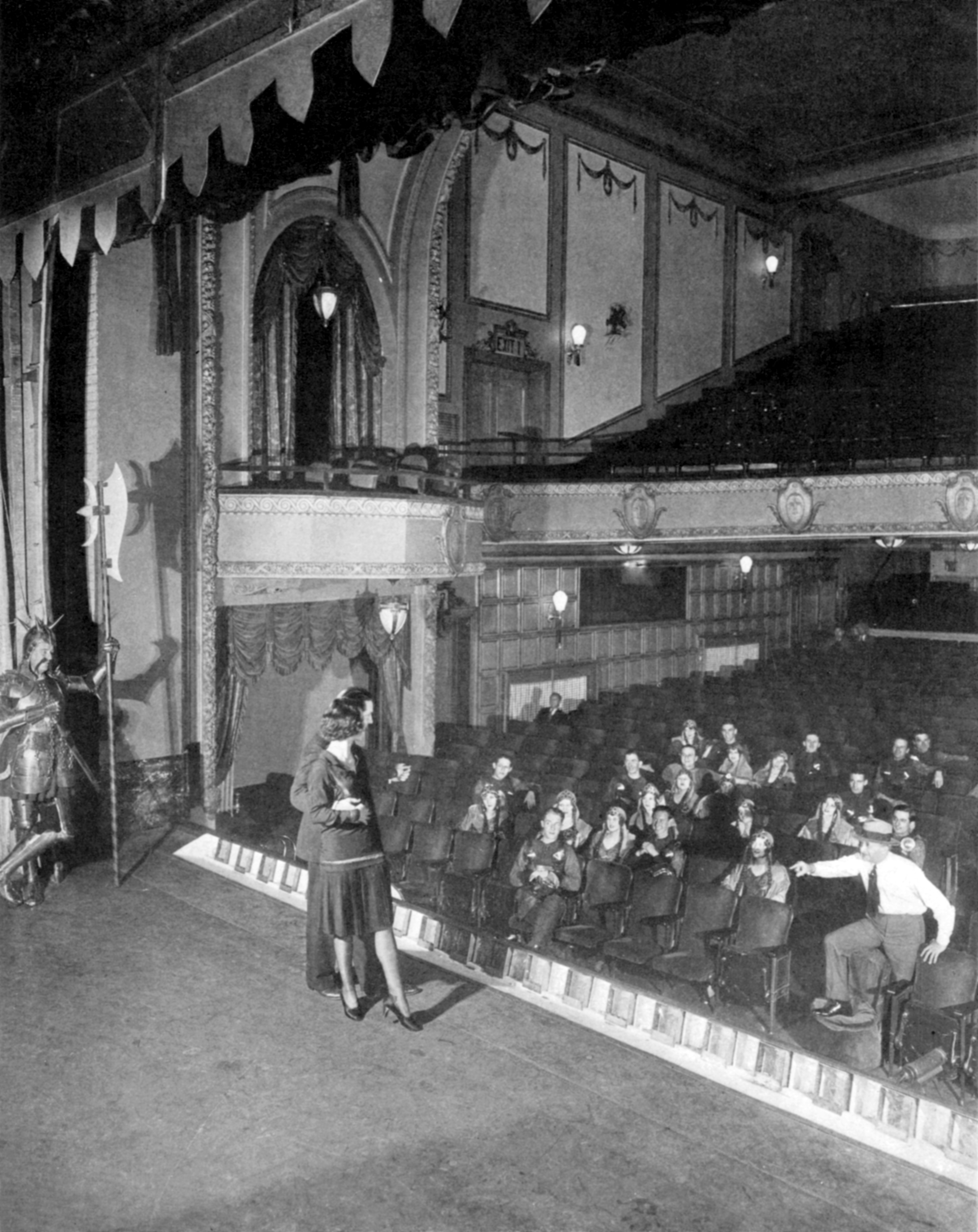
- Constance Carpenter and William Gaxton, principals of the original Broadway production of Rodgers and Hart's A Connecticut Yankee, on stage at the Vanderbilt Theatre, during a rehearsal
- Born: 19 April 1904; Bath, Somerset, England, UK
- Died: 26 December 1992 (aged 88); New York City, New York, US
- Other name: Constance Emmeline Carpenter
- Occupation: Actress
- Known for: Musical theatre

Constance Emmeline Carpenter (19 April 1904 – 26 December 1992) was an English-born American film and musical theatre actress.

== Biography ==
Carpenter was born in Bath, Somerset, in 1904, (Note: Carpenter's Who's Who in the Theatre entry knocks two years off her age, giving her birth date as 1906.) the daughter of Harold Carpenter and his wife Mabel Anne, née Cottrell, music hall artists. Her first appearance on stage was with fellow-pupils of the Lila Field Academy, a stage school whose alumni included Noël Coward and Ninette de Valois.

Her debut as an adult performer was in the C. B. Cochran revue Fun of the Fayre in 1921. She made her Broadway debut in André Charlot's Revue of 1924. She remained in America for five years, appearing in The Charlot Revue of 1926 in 1925–26, after which she played Mae in George and Ira Gershwin's Oh, Kay! in 1926 and Alice Carter in the Richard Rodgers, Lorenz Hart and Herbert Fields musical A Connecticut Yankee in which she played for a year, from November 1927.

In 1929 Carpenter returned to London, appearing in Cochran and Charlot productions. She appeared in pantomime at the Lyceum with Naughton and Gold in the Christmas 1930 season. Throughout the 1930s she divided her time between English and American engagements. In 1938 and 1939 she appeared in Terence Rattigan's long-running French Without Tears at the Criterion Theatre, London.

During World War II, Carpenter entertained troops throughout Europe, the Middle East and Asia. After returning to the United States in 1950, she took American citizenship.

Carpenter's most notable Broadway credit was The King and I in 1952 first as understudy to Gertrude Lawrence and then as the leading lady when Lawrence died during the run. In 1954 Carpenter appeared in London in An Evening with Beatrice Lillie. Her final Broadway appearance was in the Jerome Lawrence and Robert E. Lee play The Incomparable Max (1971), based on stories by Max Beerbohm.

Carpenter film credits were limited to Just for a Song (1929), Two Worlds (1930), and Brown Sugar (1931).

== Personal life ==
Carpenter married and divorced Paul Ord Hamilton, J. H. S. Lucas-Scudamore and the actor Eric Berry; she was twice married to and twice divorced from the songwriter Captain James Kennedy.

She died of a stroke in Lenox Hill Hospital in Manhattan, aged 88.

== Notes and references ==
Notes

== Sources ==
- Gaye, Freda, ed. (1967). Who's Who in the Theatre (fourteenth ed.). London: Sir Isaac Pitman and Sons. OCLC 5997224.
