= Fly with Me (musical) =

1920 musical

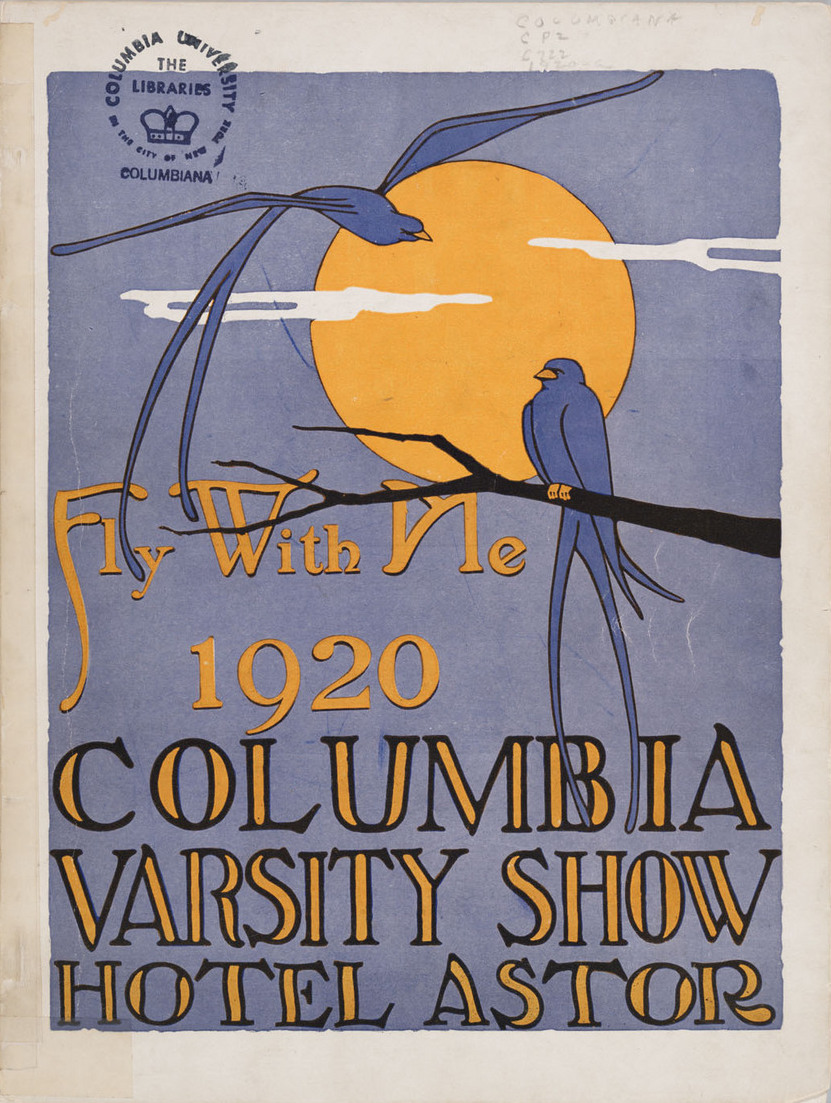
Program for Fly with Me, 1920

Fly with Me is a musical written by Rodgers and Hart for the 1920 Varsity Show at Columbia University. The book was by Milton Kroopf and Phillip Leavitt, adapted by Lorenz Hart. Lyrics were by Hart, and music by Richard Rodgers, with additional lyrics by Oscar Hammerstein II and choreography by Herbert Fields. Premiering only 18 days after their first musical, You'd Be Surprised, Fly with Me was the second collaboration between Rodgers and Hart, and incidentally the first work on which Rodgers and Hammerstein cooperated. It was one of the only collaborations between all three men.

== Background ==
When Rodgers and Hart originally submitted Fly with Me to the Varsity Show judging committee, the book was rejected, so the songs were adapted to the entry submitted by Kroopf and Leavitt. Hammerstein, a recent graduate who was on the committee, later added two of his own songs, "There's Always Room for One More" and "Weaknesses".

== Plot ==
Written during the first Red Scare, the show was set in 1970, in a fictional future world where Manhattan island is ruled by the Bolsheviks. One of the government's draconian laws forbids anyone with children from remarrying. Two married lovers, Mrs. Houghton and Mr. Larrimore, are intent on concealing the true identity of their children, students Emmy and Jimmy, while preventing them from falling in love with each other. The show's title, Fly with Me, refers to a technique in "Soviet lovemaking" which Mrs. Houghton teaches in the Love Laboratory of Bolsheviki University.

In the second act, sexual intimacy has been banned. Chinese characters Ming Ying and Tien Tong try to entrap rulebreakers by rigging a garden bench with an alarm. Professor Theophilus Lamb, the college dean and enforcer of the Soviet laws, triggers the alarm when he is joined on the bench by two college students. Pandemonium and revolution ensue, ending with widespread kissing.

== Critical reception ==
The musical premiered on March 24, 1920, at the Hotel Astor, and ran for four days. The day after the premiere, a New York Times article reported that "Music that sparkled from the rise of the curtain to its last descent was the gayest feature of the Columbia University Players' gay musical comedy, Fly with Me, in the Astor last evening." Hart's lyrics in particular received praise. In attendance on opening night was Lew Fields, who immediately commissioned Rodgers and Hart to write Poor Little Ritz Girl, which premiered later that year.

== Production history ==
Fly with Me was revived sixty years later for the 1980 Varsity Show, with a version adapted from the original by Michael Numark, since the original script and score were incomplete. Rodgers also contributed some new songs to the show, and "Weaknesses", one of the songs added by Hammerstein in 1920, was removed. Rodgers died in December 1979, less than four months before the premiere, though his widow, Dorothy Rodgers, and Hammerstein's widow, Dorothy Hammerstein, as well as Hart's sister-in-law, Dorothy Hart, were all in attendance on opening night.

== Musical numbers ==
The songs listed are taken from the program for the 1980 production.

Act I

- "Overture"
- "Opening Chorus ('Gone Are the Days')"
- "A Penny for Your Thoughts"
- "Another Melody in F"
- "Working for the Government"
- "Inspiration (The Futurist Love Song)"
- "Don't Love Me Like Othello"
- "Dreaming True"
- "Peek in Pekin'"
- "A College on Broadway"
- "Finale ('Call Me Andre')"

Act II

- "Moonlight and You"
- "Always Room for One More"
- "Peek in Pekin'" (reprise)
- "If You Were You"
- "Kid, I Love You"
- "The Third Degree of Love"
- "Gunga Dhin"
- "Twinkling Eyes"
- "Finale"
