= Ella Fitzgerald Sings the Rodgers & Hart Song Book =

1956 studio album by Ella Fitzgerald

Ella Fitzgerald Sings the Rodgers and Hart Song Book

Studio album by Ella Fitzgerald
- Released: 1956
- Recorded: August 21–31, 1956
- Genre: Jazz
- Length: 114:23
- Label: Verve
- Producer: Norman Granz

Ella Fitzgerald chronology
Ella and Louis (1956)	Ella Fitzgerald Sings the Rodgers and Hart Song Book (1956)	Ella and Louis Again (1957)

Professional ratings
Review scores
Source	Rating
AllMusic	5/5 stars
The Encyclopedia of Popular Music	5/5 stars
Music Week	3/4 stars
The Penguin Guide to Jazz Recordings	4/4 stars
The Rolling Stone Album Guide	5/5 stars
DownBeat	5/5 stars

Ella Fitzgerald Sings the Rodgers and Hart Song Book is a 1956 studio album by the American jazz singer Ella Fitzgerald, with a studio orchestra conducted and arranged by Buddy Bregman, focusing on songs written by Richard Rodgers and Lorenz Hart.

In 1999, this album was inducted into the Grammy Hall of Fame – a special Grammy award established in 1973 to honor recordings that are at least twenty-five years old and that have "qualitative or historical significance".

In 2000, Ella Fitzgerald Sings the Rodgers and Hart Song Book was voted number 642 in Colin Larkin's All Time Top 1000 Albums.

== Reception ==
DownBeat assigned the album 5 stars. Dom Cerulli wrote that in any category this release “would rate a ringing five stars . . . Ella sings with a rhythm section, a small group, a big band, and a full size orchestra with strings. There are some really striking performances of R-H songs that have been done and done again in recent years, plus others too rarely done these days . . . This two-record set proves, among other things, that Ella is simply a great vocalist. The polish she applied to these songs and the challenge they posed in range of voice and interpretation could hardly be met by anyone less an artist than she . . . Only when you hear in one big cluster all these remarkable melodies by Richard Rodgers do you realize what a towering figure he is on the popular music scene today. And Larry Hart’s now cute, now whimsical, always happy lyrics have never quite been matched. This one is a must”.

The Penguin Guide to Jazz Recordings assigned 4 stars. Colin Larkin wrote, "Ella is so supremely effective on the best tracks that one forgives the occasional blandness in handling Lorenz Hart's wit".

Scott Yanow wrote in his AllMusic review, "The arrangements by Buddy Bregman for the string orchestra and big band only border on jazz but she manages to swing the medium-tempo numbers and give sensitivity to the ballads". Yanow also included it in his list of recommended CDs in his book The Jazz Singers The Ultimate Guide.

== Track listing ==
For the 1956 Verve 2-LP album, Verve MG V-4002-2

All lyrics are written by Lorenz Hart; all music is composed by Richard Rodgers.

Side one
No.	Title	Length
1.	"Have You Met Miss Jones?"	3:41
2.	"You Took Advantage of Me"	3:27
3.	"A Ship Without a Sail"	4:07
4.	"To Keep My Love Alive"	3:34
5.	"Dancing on the Ceiling"	4:06
6.	"The Lady Is a Tramp"	3:21
7.	"With a Song in My Heart"	2:44
8.	"Manhattan"	2:48

Side two
No.	Title	Length
1.	"Johnny One Note"	2:12
2.	"I Wish I Were in Love Again"	2:36
3.	"Spring Is Here"	3:38
4.	"It Never Entered My Mind"	4:06
5.	"This Can't Be Love"	2:54
6.	"Thou Swell"	2:03
7.	"My Romance"	3:42
8.	"Where or When"	2:46
9.	"Little Girl Blue"	3:53

Side three
No.	Title	Length
1.	"Give It Back to the Indians"	3:10
2.	"Ten Cents a Dance"	4:06
3.	"There's a Small Hotel"	2:48
4.	"I Didn't Know What Time It Was"	3:46
5.	"Ev'rything I've Got"	3:21
6.	"I Could Write a Book"	3:38
7.	"The Blue Room"	2:29
8.	"My Funny Valentine"	3:52

Side four
No.	Title	Length
1.	"Bewitched, Bothered and Bewildered"	7:01
2.	"Mountain Greenery"	2:13
3.	"Wait Till You See Him"	1:30
4.	"Lover"	3:16
5.	"Isn't It Romantic?"	3:00
6.	"Here in My Arms"	1:52
7.	"Blue Moon"	3:11
8.	"My Heart Stood Still"	3:02
9.	"I've Got Five Dollars"	2:39

Bonus track; issued on disc two of 2009 the Verve 2CD reissue, Verve 314-5372582
No.	Title	Length
35.	"Lover" (Alternative mono take)	3:15

In 2012, Verve also released an audiophile downloadable version of the LP in up to 192 kHz/24 bit lossless FLAC quality.

== Personnel ==
- Ella Fitzgerald - Vocals
- Buddy Bregman - Arranger, Conductor.

Liner notes by Richard Rodgers, Oscar Hammerstein II, William Simon and Norman Granz.

== Charts ==
=== Monthly charts ===
Monthly chart performance for Ella Fitzgerald Sings the Rodgers & Hart Song Book
Chart (2026)	Peak position
German Jazz Albums (Offizielle Top 100)	16
