= William Gaxton =

American actor (1893–1963)

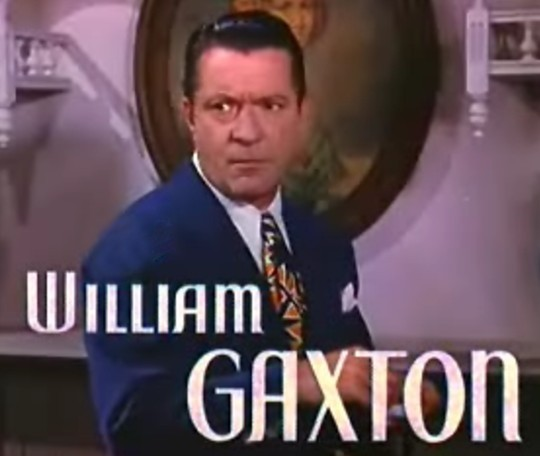
- from the trailer for Best Foot Forward (1943)

Shepherd of The Lambs
- In office 1936-1939 – 1953-54, 1956-61
- Preceded by: Frank Crumit
- Succeeded by: Fred Waring

Personal details
- Born: Arthur Anthony Gaxiola; December 2, 1893 San Francisco, California, U.S.
- Died: February 2, 1963 (aged 69) New York City, U.S.
- Resting place: Mount Olivet Cemetery, Queens, NY
- Spouse: Madeline Seitz (m. 1919)
- Relatives: Leo Carrillo (cousin)
- Education: Santa Clara College University of California, Berkeley
- Occupation: Actor, Singer
- Known for: Broadway

William Gaxton (né Arthur Anthony Gaxiola; December 2, 1893 – February 2, 1963) was an American actor of vaudeville, film, and theatre. For many years, Gaxton was president of the Lambs Club, a theatrical organization in New York City. Victor Moore and he became a popular theatre duo in the 1930s and 1940s; they also appeared in a film together.

== Biography ==
Gaxton was born as Arthur Anthony Gaxiola, on December 2, 1893, in San Francisco, California. He was Californio of Spanish ancestry and a cousin of actor Leo Carrillo's. He attended the Boone's Military Academy (or Boone's University School for Boys), and Berkeley High School, in Berkeley, California, and Lowell High School in San Francisco.

Gaxton attended Santa Clara College with classmate Edmund Lowe; and the University of California, Berkeley. He was in the Sigma Phi fraternity at UC Berkeley.

== Career ==
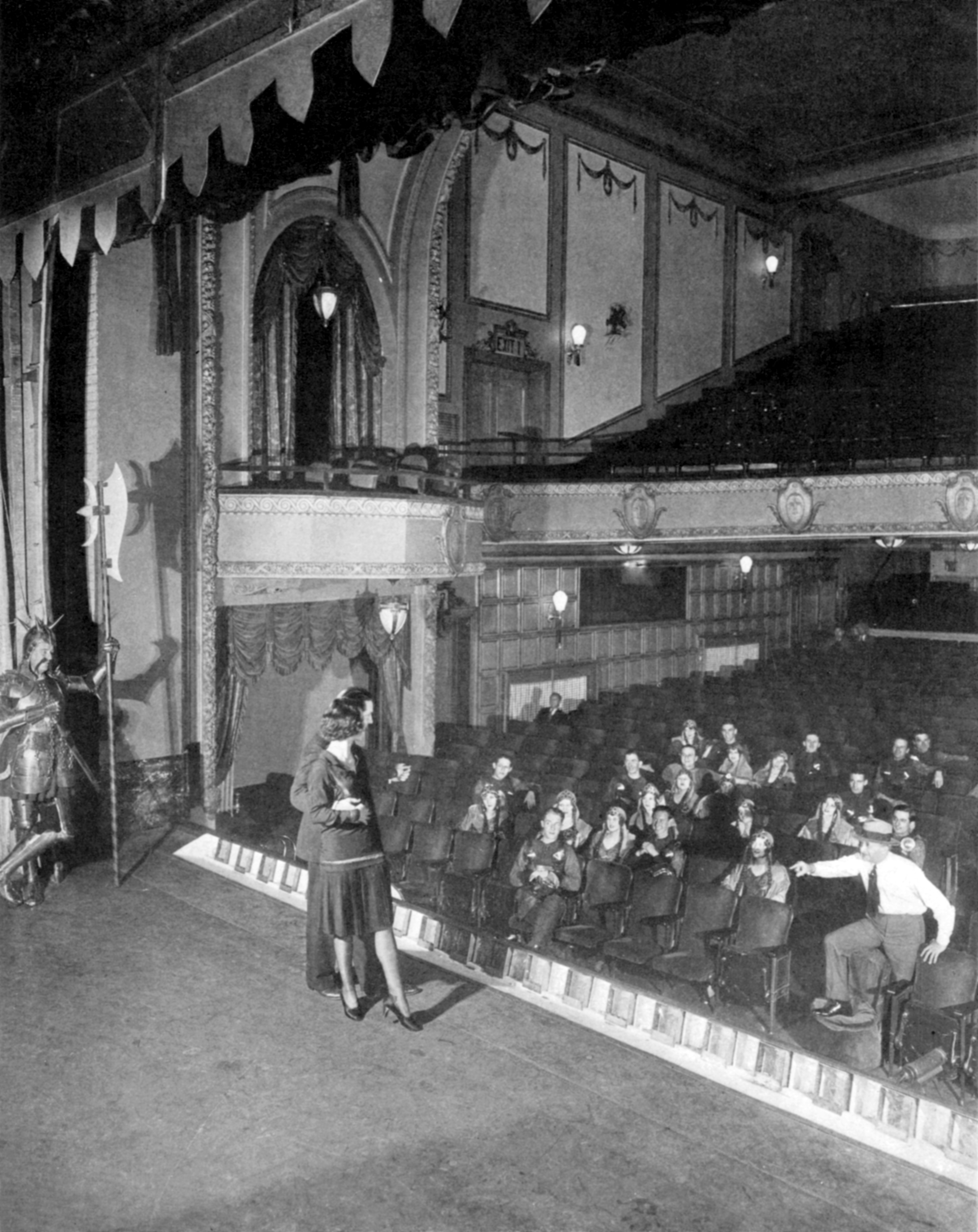
Constance Carpenter and Gaxton, principals of the Broadway production of A Connecticut Yankee at the Vanderbilt Theatre during a midrun rehearsal of the hit musical (1928). Producer Lew Fields is seen at right, in shirtsleeves.

Gaxton appeared on film and onstage. He debuted on Broadway in the Music Box Revue on October 23, 1922.

Gaxton was president of the Lambs Club, a theatrical organization in New York City, from 1936 to 1939, 1952 to 1953, and 1957 to 1961.

On radio, Gaxton starred in Broadway Showtime, a 30-minute musical drama that ran on CBS from December 27, 1943, to June 26, 1944.

In 1961 and 1962, Arthur Treacher and he starred in Guy Lombardo's production of the musical Paradise Island at Jones Beach Marine Theater.

He died from cancer on February 2, 1963, in Manhattan. He was survived by his wife, Madeline Cameron Seitz, who was part of the Cameron Sisters dance team.

== Filmography ==
Gaxton starred in the film version (1931) of the play Fifty Million Frenchmen, as well as The Silent Partner (1931), Their Big Moment (1934), Best Foot Forward (1943), The Heat's On (1943), and Diamond Horseshoe (1945).

== Broadway ==
He debuted on Broadway in the Music Box Revue on October 23, 1922, and later starred in Rodgers and Hart's A Connecticut Yankee (1927), singing "Thou Swell"; Cole Porter's Fifty Million Frenchmen (1929), singing "You Do Something to Me"; Of Thee I Sing (1931) with Victor Moore; Cole Porter's Anything Goes (1934), with Ethel Merman and Victor Moore; White Horse Inn (1936); Leave It to Me! (1938) with Victor Moore; Louisiana Purchase (1940); and Hollywood Pinafore (1945).
