= Ethel Azama =

American singer

- Born: August 28, 1934; Honolulu, Hawaii, United States
- Died: March 7, 1984 (aged 49) Honolulu, Hawaii, United States
- Genres: Jazz, traditional pop, haole
- Occupation: Singer
- Instrument: Vocalist
- Years active: 1955–1984
- Label: Liberty

Ethel Azama (August 28, 1934 – March 7, 1984) was an American jazz and popular singer and recording artist. She sang regularly in nightclubs and other concert venues between the mid-1950s and 1984.

Ethel was born and raised in Honolulu, Hawaii and was of Okinawan ancestry. She was a second-generation Ryukyuan American.

== Career ==
She started her professional career in 1955 as an emcee at the Oasis nightclub in Honolulu. The club served as a venue for musical revues from Japan. In 1956, she began working as a standards singer in U.S. military clubs on Oahu such as The Cannon Club on Diamond Head. Pianist Paul Conrad usually served as her accompanist for her gigs. Conrad also wrote many of her arrangements. By 1957 she was singing at Waikiki Beach nightclubs as the opening act for headliners such as popular singer Herb Jeffries and blues singer and guitarist Josh White. With the help of bandleader Martin Denny, Azama obtained a one-album deal with Liberty Records (1957–58). She released the album Exotic Dreams in 1958, which Paul Conrad arranged, on which she sang standards, including "Speak Low" and "Autumn Leaves". She sang a few hapa-haole numbers and a Japanese folk song on the album. She made had her singing debut on the American mainland in January 1959 when she appeared at Ye Little Club in Beverly Hills, California.

Pop singer Jimmie Rodgers attended one of her shows and persuaded Liberty Records executives to allow her to record another LP. The 1959 album, Cool Heat, consists entirely of American standards. Ethel sings a mix of ballads such as "My Ship" (music by Kurt Weill and lyrics by Ira Gershwin) and "Like Someone in Love" (music by Jimmy Van Heusen and lyrics by Johnny Burke) and rhythmic tunes such as "Johnny One Note" (music by Richard Rodgers and lyrics by Lorenz Hart).

From 1959 to 1960, she sang in nightclubs in Los Angeles, New York City, and Chicago. She also appeared in Las Vegas casinos on bills with jazz and standards singer Mel Tormé and with the jazz vocal group The Four Freshmen. In May 1960, she appeared on a national network variety special titled, Music on Ice. Azama sang several songs on the hour-long special which also featured French figure skater Jacqueline Du Bief, Japanese dancer Takeuchi Keigo, and singer-host Johnny Desmond.

== Family ==
During the late 1960s, Ethel and Johnny Todd settled permanently in Honolulu where Ethel gave birth to their two children. She resumed singing in Waikiki Beach nightclubs as a soloist and occasionally paired with local standards singer Jimmy Borges. She had minor acting roles on several episodes of the television series Hawaii Five-O in the mid-1970s.

== Death ==
She continued to sing on a regular basis in nightclubs and other public venues on Oahu until her sudden death from a cerebral aneurysm in 1984, aged 49.

== Discography ==
- Exotic Dreams (Liberty, 1959)
- Cool Heat (Liberty, 1960)
