= With a Song in My Heart (song) =

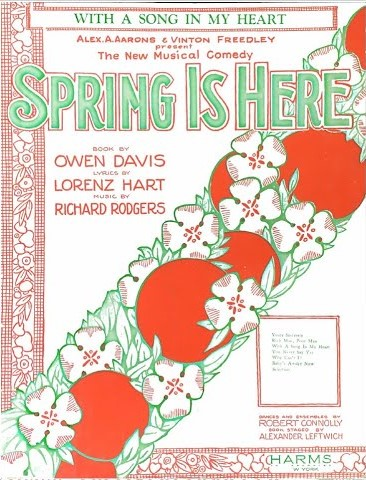
- Sheet music cover, 1929

Song
- Published: 1929
- Genre: Showtune
- Composer(s): Richard Rodgers
- Lyricist(s): Lorenz Hart

"With a Song in My Heart" is a show tune from the 1929 Rodgers and Hart musical Spring Is Here.

== Background ==
In the original Broadway production it was introduced by John Hundley and Lillian Taiz. The following year, it was sung by Lawrence Gray in the Hollywood musical version of that show by Bernice Claire and Frank Albertson. The most popular recording of the song in 1929 was by Leo Reisman.

== Notable recordings ==
- A recording with Perry Como, sung with choir and orchestra conducted by Henri René, was made in New York City on December 23, 1948. It was released by RCA Victor Records as catalog number 20-3329 (in USA) and by EMI on the His Master's Voice label as catalog number BD 1230.
- Arild Andresen, piano with guitar and bass recorded it in Oslo on March 11, 1955 as the second melody of the medley "Klaver-Cocktail Nr. 3" along with "Sophisticated Lady" and "Flamingo". The medley was released on the 78 rpm record His Master's Voice A.L. 3514.
- Ella Fitzgerald recorded it in 1956 on her two-record Verve release: "Ella Fitzgerald Sings the Rodgers and Hart Songbook" which was inducted into the Grammy Hall of Fame in 1999.
- It was covered by The Supremes on their 1966 album I Hear A Symphony. Shortly after it was re-recorded for an intended inclusion on their 1967 tribute album to Rodgers & Hart titled The Supremes Sing Rodgers & Hart, but that version remained an outtake released for the first time in 1987 on The Rodgers & Hart Collection.
- Bing Crosby recorded the song in 1975 for his album At My Time of Life
- Renowned tenor Anthony Kearns recorded the song, naming his highly anticipated debut solo CD after the title track, "With a Song in My Heart."

== Other film appearances ==
- In 1933, it was included in a two-reel version of the film re-titled Yours Sincerely, part of the Broadway Brevities series, starring Lanny Ross.
- In the 1944 Hollywood musical This Is the Life, it was sung by Donald O'Connor and Susanna Foster.
- It was included in the 1948 musical film, Words and Music, a biography of Rodgers and Hart, where it was sung by Perry Como.
- A notable version of the song features in Michael Curtiz's 1950 Hollywood musical biographical drama Young Man with a Horn, performed by the film's star Doris Day with iconic trumpeter Harry James and His Orchestra.
- In the 1951 Hollywood musical Painting the Clouds with Sunshine it was sung by Dennis Morgan and Lucille Norman.
- It was the title song in the 1952 Hollywood musical With a Song in My Heart, a biographical movie about Jane Froman, in which it was sung by Froman on the soundtrack for Susan Hayward.
- In the 1953 science fiction classic The Beast from 20,000 Fathoms the song is playing in the background while Tom Nesbitt is trying to identify the beast he saw from sketches of prehistoric creatures.

== Popular culture ==
- The line "With a song in my heart" is performed by a male penguin in the animated film "Happy Feet" (2006).
- It was also the signature tune for the BBC radio programme "Family Favourites", as an orchestral version arranged and conducted by Andre Kostelanetz.

== See also ==
- Sonny's Crib
