= Babes in Arms =

1937 musical by Richard Rodgers and Lorenz Hart

- Original Broadway Logo
- Music: Richard Rodgers
- Lyrics: Lorenz Hart
- Book: Richard Rodgers and Lorenz Hart
- Productions: 1937 Broadway; 1939 Film; 1976 Off-Broadway; 1985 US tour

Babes in Arms is a 1937 coming-of-age musical comedy with music by Richard Rodgers, lyrics by Lorenz Hart, and book by Rodgers and Hart. It concerns a group of small-town Long Island teenagers who put on a show to avoid being sent to a work farm by the town sheriff. Several songs in Babes in Arms became pop standards, including the title song, "Where or When", "The Lady Is a Tramp", and "My Funny Valentine". The film version, released in 1939, starred Judy Garland and Mickey Rooney and was directed by Busby Berkeley.

== Different versions ==
The original version had strong political overtones with discussions of Nietzsche, the appearance of a Communist character, and two African-American youths who are victims of racism. In 1959 George Oppenheimer created a "sanitized, de-politicized rewrite" for stage performance; it is now the most frequently performed version. In the new version, the young people are trying to save a local summer stock theatre from being demolished, not trying to avoid being sent to a work farm. The sequence of the songs and orchestration are changed drastically, and the dance numbers eliminated.

The 1959 version was the only one available for performance until 1998 when the Cincinnati College Conservatory of Music presented the original version (with a few race references slightly re-edited).

== Production history ==
Babes in Arms opened on Broadway at the Shubert Theatre on April 14, 1937, transferred to the Majestic Theatre on October 25, 1937, and closed on December 18, 1937, after 289 performances. The production, under the auspices of Dwight Deere Wiman, was staged by Robert B. Sinclair with choreography by George Balanchine. Settings were by Raymond Sovey, and costumes by Helene Pons. Hans Spialek created the orchestrations and Gene Salzer led the orchestra which included pianists Edgar Fairchild and Adam Carroll. The cast featured Mitzi Green, Ray Heatherton, and Alfred Drake, as well as the Nicholas Brothers.

A studio cast recording starring Gregg Edelman as Val, Judy Blazer as Billie, Jason Graae as Gus, Donna Kane as Dolores, Judy Kaye as Baby Rose, Adam Grupper as Peter, with JQ and the Bandits as the Quartet and featuring the New Jersey Symphony Orchestra was released by New World Records in 1990.

On July 20, 2016, All Star Productions revived the original version at Ye Old Rose and Crown Theatre Pub, London. Theatre critic Darren Luke Mawdsley described the work as 'outmoded,' stating that he "understand[s] why it has not been staged here [in the UK] in 15 years."

Porchlight Music Theatre presented Babes in Arms in Chicago, Illinois in 2015.

=== Revivals of original 1930s version ===
In addition to the revival of the 1930s original, a New York City Center Encores! staged concert version ran in February 1999. It was directed and choreographed by Kathleen Marshall and featured Erin Dilly, David Campbell, Jessica Stone and Christopher Fitzgerald.

The Cohoes Music Hall presented a reconstructed version of the 1937 production under the supervision of Richard Rodgers in 1976. This production was choreographed by Dennis Grimaldi and directed by David Kitchen and Dennis Grimaldi.

=== Productions of the 1950s version ===
In 1985, Ginger Rogers directed a production at the Music Hall in Tarrytown, New York, that starred Randy Skinner who also choreographed the show and Karen Ziemba as Susie. The song "I Didn't Know What Time It Was" was added to the song list.

The musical was produced at the Chichester Festival Theatre from June 7, 2007, through July 7, 2007, and cast Judy Garland's daughter Lorna Luft as the domineering mother of former child star Baby Rose Owens. One reviewer complained that the musical seemed to have lost its legendary political bite, evidently unaware that this was the revised 1950s de-politicized version. Luft was given two new songs from neither the stage version nor the film in which her mother appeared.

=== Goodspeed Opera House Production ===
In 2002, a production was mounted at Goodspeed Opera using a new book by Joe DiPietro which included plot points from the original 1937 version and also elements from the 1939 MGM film. The original score was utilized along with additional Rodgers and Hart songs. Randy Skinner choreographed the production.

== Plot of original 1937 version ==
In Seaport, Long Island in the 1930s, Val and Marshall's vaudeville parents leave them behind to go on tour. Val meets Billie, a girl who has driven from the coast, only to have her car break down. The pair sing a love song about their sense of having met before ("Where or When").

The Sheriff then visits them to inform them that they have to work at the work farm because they are not yet 21. The "kids" decide that they will stick around instead and find another way to support themselves ("Babes in Arms"), forming a group with Val as the leader. After deciding nothing (except that violence is good), they disperse.

Dolores, the Sheriff's daughter, talks to Gus, her ex, who tries to woo her but fails. However, the two then sing and flirt about how they do not care that their relationship is over ("I Wish I Were in Love Again"). Marshall arrives, jealous of Gus still wooing Dolores. When Val enters mentioning that he has also kissed Dolores, a fight begins and escalates when others enter. The sheriff comes in and the kids pretend to be dancing. This causes Val to decide to put on their own follies. The Sheriff decides to give them two weeks to put on the show ("Babes in Arms Reprise").

Later, Val enters and tells Irving and Ivor to practice their number ("Light on Our Feet"). Lee then arrives and chastises his brother, Beauregard, for hanging out with "the blacks". Billie then convinces Lee to invest his money in the show. Lee smears some of her lipstick on his cheek and convinces the boys that she kissed him.

The boys next convince "Baby Rose", a former child star, to be in their show. Rose performs a number she learned (Way Out West).

Billie enters with a jealous Val. After calming him, they discuss the show. Lee does not want Irving and Ivor in the show. After learning this, Val leaves in a huff. Billie reflects on her romance with Val ("My Funny Valentine"). They transition into the day of the show and show the final number of the follies performed by Baby Rose ("Johnny One Note"). Backstage, Lee and Val fight over letting Irving and Ivor go on despite their race. Val punches Lee, and Irving and Ivor go and do the big dance finale ("Johnny One Note Ballet").

Act 2 opens on the gang sitting despondently trying to cheer each other up because they are at the work farm ("Imagine"). Val comes in and calls them away to lunch, staying behind to inform Billie that his parents will be away for 3-4 more months. They talk and Val mocks Billie's beliefs on luck and her immaturity ("All at Once").

For the gang's first night off, the sheriff is throwing a party in a field on Val's property. The former communist Peter enters, having won money in a raffle, and proclaims that he is to travel the world and not share his money to which the gang is upset ("Imagine Reprise"). A ballet dream sequence of his travels ("Peter's Ballet") follows. After the ballet he decides to invest the money ("Imagine Reprise 2").

Later at the party, the Sheriff attempts to make good with the kids. Billie tells Val that she plans on leaving the farm for the road. Val insists on going with her before being called back to the kitchen. Billie sings about how she doesn't mind driving around. She also talks about how she likes living on her own terms ("Lady is a Tramp").

Peter returns to the party informing the crew that he lost all the money. The gang leaves following the news of a trans-Atlantic flight and Delores tells Gus that she will come work on the farm to be with him. He reacts by telling her how she doesn't return his affections and drags him along ("You are so Fair"). After pretending to not care about each other, they admit that they like each other.

The gang re-enters and listen to the radio. They realize the Aviator must make a forced landing, and in their field no less! After much scrambling, they call the airport to get reporters to come, and Val decides to impersonate the aviator. The reporters believe his impersonation and the city decides to throw the aviator a party. After concocting a scheme, Billie takes control of the unconscious and tied-up aviator and relishes the fact that the gang treats her as an equal ("Lady is a Tramp Reprise").

At the party, the gang repeatedly interrupts the mayor's introduction of the Aviator to delay the Aviator's speech. Performing a variety of musical numbers ("Specialty: You are so fair, Imagine, My Funny Valentine, Light on Our Feet, and Lady is a Tramp"). After The Aviator's speech the entire chorus performs a rousing closing number ("Finale Ultimo").

== Original Broadway cast ==
- Mitzi Green as Billie Smith
- Ray Heatherton as Val Lamar
- Alfred Drake as Marshall Blackstone
- Duke McHale as Peter Jackson
- Wynn Murray as Baby Rose
- Rolly Pickert as Gus Fielding
- Grace McDonald as Dolores Reynolds
- Harold Nicholas as Ivor DeQuincy
- Fayard Nicholas as Irving DeQuincy
- Dana Hardwick as Lee Calhoun
- George Watts as Sheriff Reynolds

== Musical numbers ==
Overture [including the Lamars' act and the Blackstones' act]—Orchestra

ACT I

- "Opening Act I"—Orchestra
- "Where or When"—Billie & Val
- "Babes in Arms"—Val, Marshall, Billie & The Gang
- "I Wish I Were in Love Again"—Gus & Dolores
- "Babes in Arms—Reprise"—Marshall, Sheriff & The Gang
- "Light On Our Feet" with dance (originally the racially insensitive "All Dark People Are Light On Their Feet")—The DeQuincy Bros.
- "Way Out West" with dance break—Baby Rose & Men's Quartet
- "My Funny Valentine"—Billie
- "Johnny One Note"—Baby Rose
- "Ballet—Johnny One Note" including (Orchestra)

Entr'acte—Orchestra

ACT II

- "Imagine"—Men's Quartet, Baby Rose, Peter, & Marshall
- "All At Once"—Val & Billie
- "Imagine—Reprise #1"—Peter & The Men's Quartet
- "Peter's Journey (Ballet)"—Orchestra
- "Imagine—Reprise #2"—The Men's Quartet & Peter
- "The Lady Is a Tramp" with encore—Billie
- "You Are So Fair" with two dances—Gus & Dolores with Orchestra
- "Reprise: The Lady Is a Tramp"—Billie
- "Specialty #1 (Light On Our Feet) & Specialty #2 (Imagine)"—Orchestra
- "Finale Ultimo"—The Gang with Val & Billie
- "Bows (Johnny One-Note)"—Orchestra
- "Exit Music (Where or When)"—Orchestra

== See also ==
- Babes in Arms (film)
