= Vanderbilt Theatre =

Former theatre in Manhattan, New York

Coordinates: 40.75924°N 73.98333°W

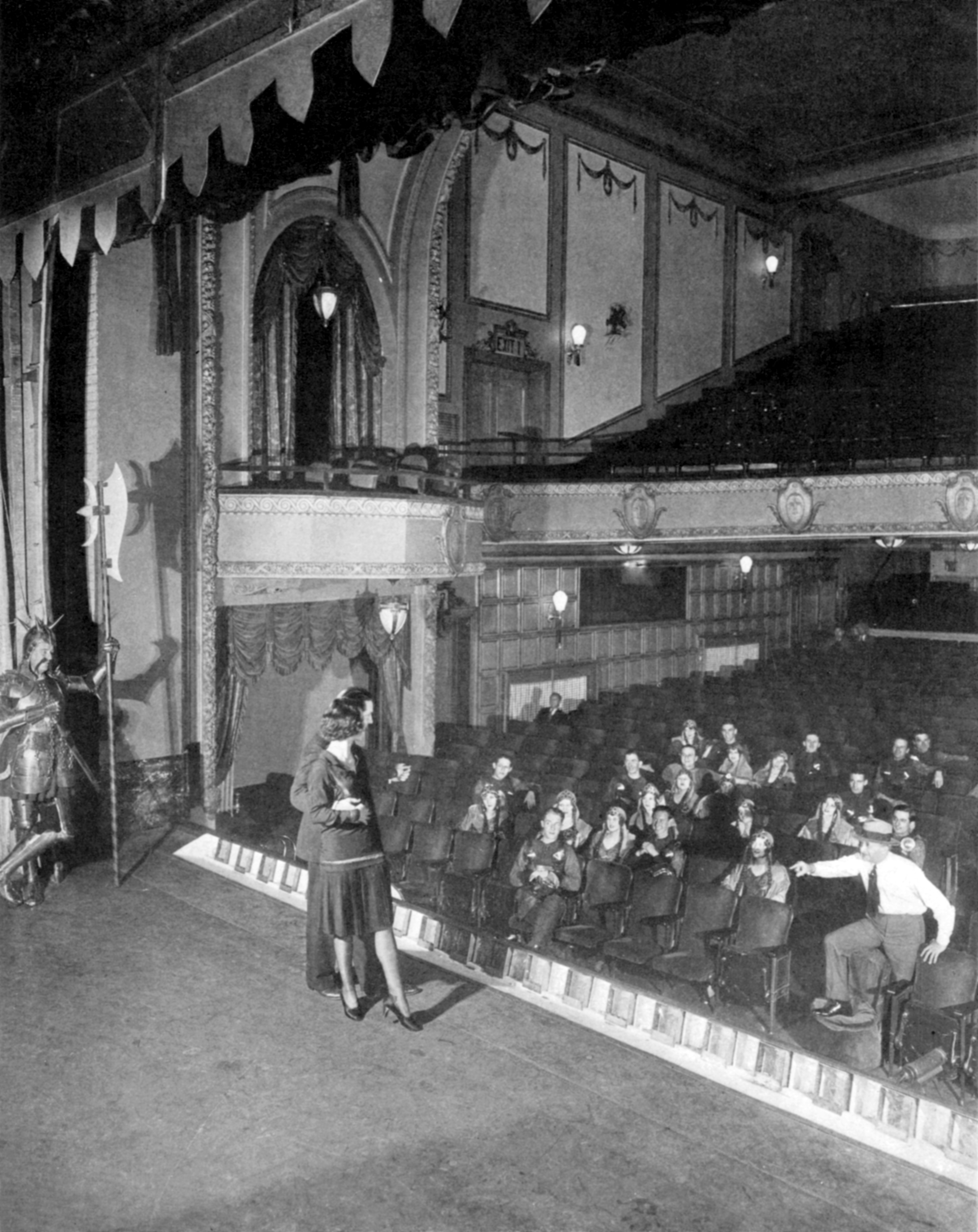
- Constance Carpenter and William Gaxton, principals of the original Broadway production of Rodgers and Hart's A Connecticut Yankee, on stage at the Vanderbilt Theatre during a mid-run rehearsal of the hit musical (1928)
- Interactive map of Vanderbilt Theatre
- Address: 148 West 48th Street; Manhattan, New York City
- Capacity: 780 (est.)
- Type: Broadway
- Current use: Replaced by parking facility

Construction
- Opened: March 7, 1918
- Closed: 1954
- Years active: 1918 – 1939; 1953 – 1954
- Architect: Eugene De Rosa

The Vanderbilt Theatre was a Broadway theatre at 148 West 48th Street in Midtown Manhattan, New York City, designed by architect Eugene De Rosa for producer Lyle Andrews. It opened in 1918, and permanently closed in 1954.

== History ==
The 780-seat theatre hosted the long-running musical Irene from 1919 to 1921. In the mid-1920s, several Rodgers and Hart musicals played at the theatre. Andrews lost the theatre during the Great Depression, and in 1931 it was briefly renamed the Tobis to show German films. The experiment was a failure, and the theatre returned to legitimate use. No new shows played at the theatre from 1939 until 1953, as it was used as a radio studio, first by NBC, then by ABC, until 1952. Irving Maidman purchased the theatre and began to produce new shows in 1953, but the theatre was demolished after only a year, being replaced by a 6-story parking garage.

== Notable productions ==
- 1919: Irene
- 1926: The Girl Friend
- 1926: Peggy-Ann
- 1927: A Connecticut Yankee
- 1935: Mulatto by Langston Hughes
