= Johnny One Note =

Song
- Published: 1937
- Songwriter: Lorenz Hart
- Composer: Richard Rodgers

"Johnny One Note" is a 1937 show tune from the 1937 Rodgers and Hart musical Babes in Arms, in which it was introduced by Wynn Murray. Judy Garland sang it in the Rodgers & Hart biopic Words and Music (1948).

Popular recordings in 1937 were by Hal Kemp & His Orchestra (vocal by Skinnay Ennis) and by Victor Young and His Orchestra (vocal by Bobby Dolan).

== Other notable recordings ==
- Judy Garland – single release for MGM Records (catalog No. 30172) b/ I Wish I Were in Love Again (1948).
- Mary Martin - included in the album Babes in Arms (1951).
- Blossom Dearie – for her album Blossom Dearie (1956)
- Ella Fitzgerald – Ella Fitzgerald Sings the Rodgers & Hart Songbook (1956)
- Chris Connor – for her album Chris Craft (1958). Later included in Jazz Date with Chris Connor (1999)
- Eydie Gorme - Gormé Sings Showstoppers (1959).
- Ethel Azama with the Marty Paich Orchestra (1959)
- Johnny Mathis for his album Live It Up! (1961)
- Anita O'Day – Anita O'Day and Billy May Swing Rodgers and Hart (1960)
- Carol Burnett – Carol Burnett Remembers How They Stopped the Show (1961).
- Shirley Bassey - I've Got a Song for You (1966)
- The Supremes – The Supremes Sing Rodgers & Hart: The Complete Recordings (2002) – recorded during sessions for the original 1967 LP and included as a bonus track on the 2002 CD
- Ted Heath – Big Band Percussion (1968) – an instrumental version, the first eight bars of which were used for many years as the opening theme to BBC1's children's news programme John Craven's Newsround
- Barbra Streisand (in a medley with "One Note Samba") – Barbra Streisand... and Other Musical Instruments (1973)
