= I Wish I Were in Love Again =

1937 show tune by Rodgers and Hart

Song
- Published: 1937 by Chappell & Co.
- Songwriter: Lorenz Hart
- Composer: Richard Rodgers

"I Wish I Were in Love Again" is a show tune from the 1937 Rodgers and Hart musical Babes in Arms. In the original show, Dolores, the Sheriff's daughter (played by Grace McDonald), talks to Gus, her former boyfriend (Rolly Pickert), who tries to woo her unsuccessfully. They then sing about how they do not care that their relationship is over. The song was omitted from the 1939 film version.

Judy Garland and Mickey Rooney performed it in the 1948 film Words and Music. Rooney and Garland released it as a single in 1948 as a B-side with "Johnny One Note." Ella Fitzgerald, Frank Sinatra, Johnny Matthis, Tony Bennett, Rosemary Clooney, Julie Andrews, Joni Mitchell and more also recorded the song.

== Notable recordings ==
- Judy Garland - recorded November 15, 1947 for Decca Records (catalog No. 24469)
- Judy Garland and Mickey Rooney - recorded for MGM Records (catalog No. 30172)
- Ella Fitzgerald - Ella Fitzgerald Sings the Rodgers & Hart Songbook (1956)
- Mel Torme - Songs for Any Taste (1957)
- Frank Sinatra, A Swingin Affair!, 1957
- Eddie Fisher - As Long as There's Music (1958)
- Johnny Mathis - The Rhythms and Ballads of Broadway (1960)
- Tony Bennett - Tony Bennett Sings... More Great Rodgers & Hart (1977), and Perfectly Frank (1992)
- Rosemary Clooney - Swing Around Rosie (1959), and Show Tunes (1988)
- Mel Tormé and Cleo Laine - Nothing Without You (1992)
- Julie Andrews - Broadway: The Music of Richard Rodgers (1994)
- Susannah McCorkle - From Broken Hearts to Blue Skies (1999)
- Joni Mitchell - Both Sides Now (2000)
- Audra McDonald - Happy Songs (2002)
- Stacey Kent - In Love Again: The Music of Richard Rodgers (2002)
