= Present Arms (musical) =

- Sheet music cover (cropped)
- Music: Richard Rodgers
- Lyrics: Lorenz Hart
- Book: Herbert Fields
- Productions: 1928 Broadway

Present Arms is a Broadway musical comedy that opened April 26, 1928, with music by Richard Rodgers, lyrics by Lorenz Hart, and the book by Herbert Fields. It was produced by Lew Fields, with musical numbers staged by Busby Berkeley. It ran for 155 performances at the Lew Fields' Mansfield Theatre, which is known as the Lena Horne Theatre today. Present Arms was filmed in 1930 with Irene Dunne, with its title changed to Leathernecking. The film is presumed lost.

== Plot ==
The show starred Charles King, Flora Le Breton, Joyce Barbour and Busby Berkeley. A man from Brooklyn is serving as a buck private in Pearl Harbor. He flirts with an English Peer's daughter; however, she is being pursued by a German, who raises pineapples in Hawaii. The Brooklynite pretends to be a Captain in order to make an impression, but he is found out, booted out, and loses out on the girl, until he proves himself in a shipwreck.

== Songs ==
Act One

- "Tell It to the Marines"
- "You Took Advantage of Me"
- "Do I Hear You (Saying I Love You)?"
- "A Kiss for Cinderella"
- "Is It the Uniform?"
- "Crazy Elbows"

Act Two

- "Down By the Sea"
- "I'm a Fool for You (I'm a Fool, Little One)"
- "Blue Ocean Blues"
- "Hawaii"
- "Kohala, Welcome"
