= Words and Music (1948 film) =

1948 film by Norman Taurog

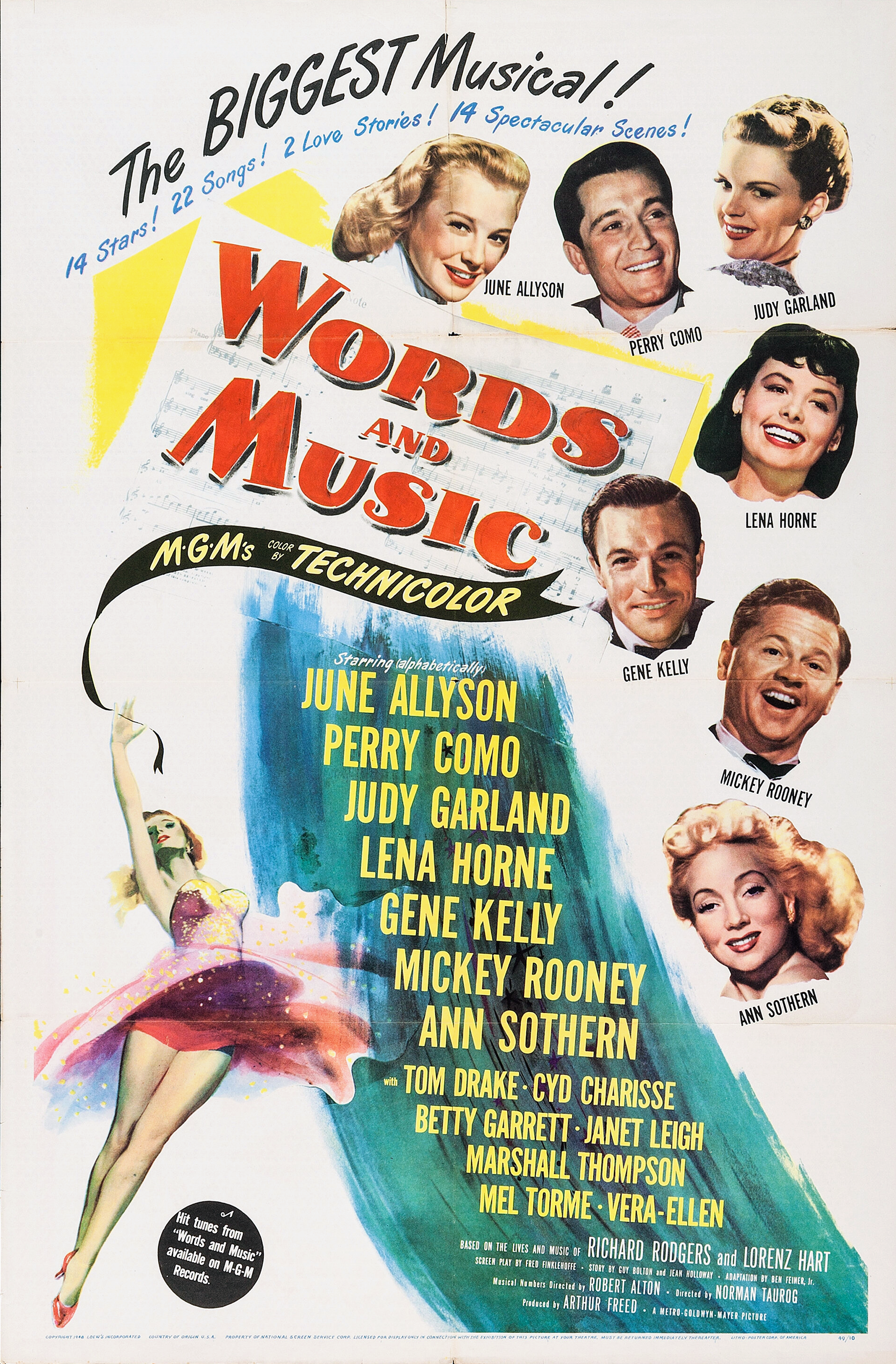
- Release cover
- Directed by: Norman Taurog
- Screenplay by: Fred F. Finklehoffe; Ben Feiner Jr. (adaptation)
- Story by: Guy Bolton; Jean Holloway
- Produced by: Arthur Freed
- Starring: Tom Drake; Mickey Rooney
- Cinematography: Charles Rosher; Harry Stradling
- Edited by: Albert Akst; Ferris Webster
- Music by: Richard Rodgers & Lorenz Hart
- Production company: Metro-Goldwyn-Mayer
- Distributed by: Loew's Inc.
- Release date: December 9, 1948
- Running time: 120 minutes
- Country: United States
- Language: English
- Budget: $3,048,000
- Box office: $4,552,000

Words and Music is a 1948 American biographical musical film loosely based on the creative partnership of the composer Richard Rodgers and lyricist Lorenz Hart. The film stars Mickey Rooney as Hart and Tom Drake as Rodgers, along with Janet Leigh, Betty Garrett, Ann Sothern, and numerous musical stars. The film is best remembered as the final screen pairing of Rooney and Judy Garland, and for the lavish showcasing of the Rodgers and Hart catalogue of songs. As in many similar biopics of the era (such as Cole Porter's depiction in Night and Day), the story was heavily fictionalized. The script sanitized Hart's complex psychological problems, alcoholism, and self-destructive behavior, which all contributed to the break-up of the writing partnership and Hart's early death, as well as changed his sexual orientation.

The introduction to the film is staged as if composer Richard Rodgers was actually playing himself. Actor Tom Drake identifies himself as Rodgers and tells the audience it is about to see the story of his collaboration with Lorenz Hart. (Contemporary posters from the film featured the faces of most major cast members, including Rooney, but did not show the face of Drake, and his name was in smaller type than those of the other main stars.)

The film was the second in a series of MGM biopics about Broadway composers; it was preceded by Till the Clouds Roll By (Jerome Kern, 1946) and followed by Three Little Words (Kalmar and Ruby, 1950) and Deep in My Heart (Sigmund Romberg, 1954).

Though the film performed very well at the box office, it proved to be quite an expensive production and, as a result, failed to recoup its cost in its first release. The film was issued on DVD in 2007 by Warner Bros. and extras included video and audio outtakes. Among these were two songs deleted from the film sung by Perry Como: "Lover" and "You're Nearer".

== Plot ==
Aspiring lyricist Lorenz "Larry" Hart needs a composer for his lyrics, so Herb Fields introduces him to Richard "Dick" Rodgers and a partnership is born in 1919. They struggle to achieve success, however, and Dick considers leaving the business to sell children's underwear.

Larry becomes impressed with singer Peggy Lorgan McNeil, personally and professionally. But when a show by him and Dick is finally bound for Broadway, his promise to Peggy to play the starring role is ruined because the producer already has his protégé Joyce Harmon lined up for the part. Dick is attracted to Joyce, but she rejects him as too young to be involved with her. Next he is too old for young Dorothy Feiner. Larry makes a marriage proposal to Peggy, who turns him down, and he falls into a depression. A string of hit songs and shows follow, but Larry seems unable to enjoy the success. Conflict within his partnership with Dick arises from Larry’s unreliability and frequent absences.

After seeming to overcome his depression, things begin looking up for Larry as soon as Judy Garland agrees to do a movie with Rodgers and Hart music in it. Larry buys a home in California but falls back into melancholia, even after Dorothy marries Dick and invites Larry to share their home back East. Larry is hospitalized after collapsing at a party, but surreptitiously leaves his hospital bed one night to attend a revival of their show A Connecticut Yankee on Broadway; he stands at the back and watches for a moment, then abruptly exits the theater in distress and collapses on the sidewalk. He is hospitalized, but dies. Afterwards, at a memorial benefit concert to honor Larry, Gene Kelly introduces Perry Como who then sings “With a Song in My Heart”.

== Cast ==
- Tom Drake as Richard Rodgers
  - Bill Lee provides Richard Rodgers' singing voice
- Mickey Rooney as Lorenz Hart
- Janet Leigh as Dorothy Feiner Rodgers
- Marshall Thompson as Herbert Fields
- Betty Garrett as Peggy Lorgan McNeil
- Jeanette Nolan as Mrs. Hart
- Ann Sothern as Joyce Harmon
- Perry Como as Eddie Lorrison Anders / Himself, in Finale
- Cyd Charisse as Margo Grant
  - Eileen Wilson provides Margo Grant's singing voice
- Richard Quine as Ben Feiner Jr.
- Emory Parnell as Mr. Feiner

Guest appearances:

- June Allyson performs "Thou Swell"
- Lena Horne performs "Where or When" and "The Lady Is a Tramp"
- Judy Garland performs "I Wish I Were in Love Again" and "Johnny One Note"
- Mel Tormé performs "Blue Moon"
- Gene Kelly and Vera-Ellen dance "Slaughter on Tenth Avenue"

== Songs ==
- "Manhattan"
- "There's a Small Hotel"
- "Mountain Greenery"
- "Where's that Rainbow?"
- "On Your Toes"
- "We'll Have A Blue Room"
- "Thou Swell"
- "Where or When"
- "The Lady Is a Tramp"
- "I Wish I Were in Love Again"
- "Johnny One Note"
- "Blue Moon"
- "Slaughter on Tenth Avenue"
- "With a Song in My Heart"

== Production ==
The film was originally budgeted at $2,659,065.

== Reception ==
The film earned $3,453,000 in the US and Canada and $1,099,000 overseas but because of its high cost recorded a loss of $371,000.

The film is recognized by American Film Institute in these lists:

- 2004: AFI's 100 Years...100 Songs:
  - "The Lady Is a Tramp" – Nominated
- 2006: AFI's Greatest Movie Musicals – Nominated
