= Accordiana =

1934 American musical radio series

Accordiana was a musical radio series which was heard on CBS in 1934, airing at 8:30 p.m. on Tuesday evenings. The 30-minute program featured soprano Vivienne Segal and tenor Oliver Smith. They were accompanied by the Abe Lyman Orchestra, and the show was sometimes given in newspaper radio listings as Abe Lyman's Accordiana. Peter Dixon, in his syndicated column "Inside the Studios," reported in 1934 that Lyman directed his orchestra from the control booth instead of standing in front of the musicians.

The orchestra of Seymour Simon was also heard on Accordiana. Different orchestras were heard across the country in the same timeslots, as indicated by this July 17, 1934, entry in a newspaper radio listing:

Today's Radio Programs: 6:30—7:30 — Abe Lyman's Accordiana basic; Seymour Simon, Orch. — midwest, Milton Kellem, Orch.— Dixie

Lyman's orchestra and Segal were both on many other CBS radio programs during the 1930s, and Lyman later settled in as the regular orchestra heard during the 1930s and 1940s on Waltz Time, a program of traditional music.

== Notes ==
- Dunning, John. On The Air: The Encyclopedia of Old-Time Radio. Oxford University Press, 1998. ISBN 0-19-507678-8.

== Listen to ==
- Abe Lyman's Orchestra
