= To Keep My Love Alive =

Song
- Published: 1943
- Songwriter(s): Lorenz Hart
- Composer(s): Richard Rodgers

"To Keep My Love Alive" is a 1943 popular song composed by Richard Rodgers, with lyrics by Lorenz Hart for the 1943 revival of the 1927 musical A Connecticut Yankee, where it was introduced by Vivienne Segal. It was written especially for Segal. It was the last song that Hart wrote before his death from pneumonia.

The song outlines the many ways the singer "bumped off" her fifteen husbands in order to avoid being unfaithful to any of them. Some of her methods are arsenic poisoning, stabbing and appendectomy.

== Lyrics ==
I've been married, and married, and often I've sighed,
"I'm never a bridesmaid, I'm always a bride."
I never divorced them—I hadn't the heart--
Yet remember these sweet words: "'Til death do us part..."

=== First stanza ===
I married many men, a ton of them,
And yet I was untrue to none of them,
Because I bumped off every one of them
To keep my love alive.

Sir Paul was frail; he looked a wreck to me.
At night he was a horse's neck to me,
So I performed an appendectomy
To keep my love alive.

Sir Thomas had insomnia: he couldn't sleep at night.
I bought a little arsenic; he's sleeping now all right.

Sir Philip played the harp; I cussed the thing.
I crowned him with his harp to bust the thing,
And now he plays where harps are just the thing,
To keep my love alive,
To keep my love alive!

=== Second stanza ===
I thought Sir George had possibilities,
But his flirtations made me ill at ease,
And when I'm ill at ease, I kill at ease,
To keep my love alive

Sir Charles came from a sanatorium
And yelled for drinks in my emporium.
I mixed one drink; he's in memoriam,
To keep my love alive

Sir Francis was a singing bird, a nightingale, that's why
I tossed him off my balcony to see if he could fly.

Sir Athelstane indulged in fratricide;
He killed his dad and that was patricide.
One night I stabbed him at my mattress-side
To keep my love alive,
To keep my love alive!

=== Third stanza ===
I caught Sir James with his protectoress:
The rector’s wife, I mean the rectoress.
His heart stood still: angina pectoris,
To keep my love alive.

Sir Frank brought ladies to my palaces.
I poured a mickey in their chalices:
While paralyzed, they got paralysis,
To keep my love alive.

Sir Alfred worshipped falconry; he used to hunt at will.
I sent him on a hunting trip: They’re hunting for him still.

Sir Peter had an incongruity:
Collecting girls with promiscuity.
Now I’m collecting his annuity,
To keep my love alive,
To keep my love alive!

=== Fourth stanza ===
Sir Ethelbert would use profanity;
His language drove me near insanity.
So once again I served humanity,
To keep my love alive.

Sir Curtis made me cook each dish he ate,
And everything his heart could wish he ate,
Until I fiddled with a fish he ate,
To keep my love alive.

Sir Marmaduke was awfully tall; he didn’t fit in bed.
I solved that problem easily: I just removed his head.

Sir Mark adored me with formality;
He called a kiss an immorality.
And so I gave him immortality,
To keep my love alive,
To keep my love alive!

== Notable recordings ==
- 1957 - Ella Fitzgerald – Ella Fitzgerald Sings the Rodgers & Hart Songbook (Verve Records – MGV-4002-2)
- 1959 - Nancy Walker – I Hate Men (RCA Camden – CAS 561)
- 1960 - Blossom Dearie – Soubrette Sings Broadway Hit Songs (Verve Records – MG VS-62133)
- 1960 - Sophia Loren – Peter and Sophia (Parlophone – SGE 2021)
- 1960 - Anita O'Day – Anita O'Day and Billy May Swing Rodgers and Hart (Verve Records – MG V-2141)
