= Isn't It Romantic? =

1932 Rodgers and Hart popular song

Song
- Published: 1932 by Famous Music
- Songwriter: Lorenz Hart
- Composer: Richard Rodgers

"Isn't It Romantic?" is a popular song and part of the Great American Songbook. The music was composed by Richard Rodgers, with lyrics by Lorenz Hart. It has a 32-bar chorus in A–B–A–C form. Alec Wilder, in his book American Popular Song: The Great Innovators 1900–1950, calls it "a perfect song."

It was introduced by Maurice Chevalier and Jeanette MacDonald in the Paramount film Love Me Tonight (1932). It has since been recorded numerous times, with and without vocals, by many jazz and popular artists. The song has also since been featured in a number of other movies.

In Love Me Tonight, the song is used in a sequence in which it is first sung by Maurice Chevalier, a tailor, and then taken up by others (his customer, a cabby, a composer, a troop of soldiers, a band of gypsies) and is finally heard and sung by a princess, played by Jeanette MacDonald. The lyrics in the film are not the same as those in the published version. In 2004 this version finished at #73 in AFI's 100 Years...100 Songs survey of top tunes in American cinema.

The title is often used in headlines in The New York Times, such as "The Recession. Isn't It Romantic?", "Italy: Isn't It Romantic?", and "In Madrid, Isn't It Romantic?".

== Notable recordings ==
- Harold Stern & His Orchestra (vocal by Bill Smith) – a popular recording for Columbia Records (catalog No. 2718) in 1932.
- Jeanette MacDonald – recorded both in English and in French for Victor Records (catalog No. 24067B and 24068, respectively) on July 5, 1932.
- Hildegarde – recorded for Decca Records (catalog No. 23135) on June 19, 1939.
- Steve Conway – released in 1948 by Columbia Records (UK).
- Cyril Stapleton and his Orchestra, with vocals by Dick James and Pearl Carr – released in 1948 by Decca Records (UK).
- Vic Damone and Patti Page – recorded for Mercury Records (catalog No. 5192) (1948).
- Chet Baker – Chet Baker Quartet Records Eight Cool Sides (1954).
- Mel Tormé – It's a Blue World (1955)
- Tal Farlow – Tal (1956)
- Ella Fitzgerald recorded this on her 1957 Verve release Ella Fitzgerald Sings the Rodgers & Hart Song Book
- Carmen McRae – Book of Ballads (1958)
- Jeri Southern Jeri Southern Meets Johnny Smith (1958).
- George Shearing – Beauty and the Beat! (1959)
- Bill Evans Trio – At Shelly's Manne-Hole (1963)
- Jack Jones – Without Her (1967).
- Tony Bennett – Tony Bennett Sings The Rodgers & Hart Songbook (1973).
- Pasadena Roof Orchestra – Isn't It Romantic (1973).
- Michael Feinstein – Isn't It Romantic (1988) and Romance on Film, Romance on Broadway (2000)
- Mervyn Warren & Josie Aiello – The Out-of-Towners (1999)
- Rod Stewart – Stardust: The Great American Songbook, Volume III (2004)
- Johnny Mathis – Isn't It Romantic: The Standards Album (2005)
- Diana Krall – Turn Up the Quiet (2017)

== Other film appearances ==
- William Seiter's Hot Saturday (1932) – heard on soundtrack when Ruth Brock arrives at Romer Sheffield's house.
- Archie Mayo's Night After Night (1932) – heard on soundtrack when Joe Anton chats with Jerry Healy at his speakeasy.
- Michael Curtiz’s Private Detective 62 (1933)
- Mark Sandrich's Skylark (1941),
- Preston Sturges' The Lady Eve (1941) (played often in the score) and The Palm Beach Story (1942) (sung by Rudy Vallée during ballroom sequence).
- Several Billy Wilder films, including The Major and the Minor (1942), A Foreign Affair (1948) and Sabrina (1954) (sung by an unidentified male singer during the first Larrabee party, whistled by David while driving in the car, played when Sabrina and Linus are dancing).
- Gene Wilder's Haunted Honeymoon (1986)
- Norman Jewison's Moonstruck (1987) (Loretta's uncle sings it to his wife after they make love inspired by a full moon) https://www.funtrivia.com/en/Movies/Moonstruck-8230_2.html
- Featured in the Star Trek: The Next Generation episode "Data's Day" as Beverly Crusher teaches Data how to ballroom dance
- Featured in the 1999 remake of The Out-of-Towners, performed by Josie Aiello and Mervyn Warren.
