= Herbert Fields =

American dramatist

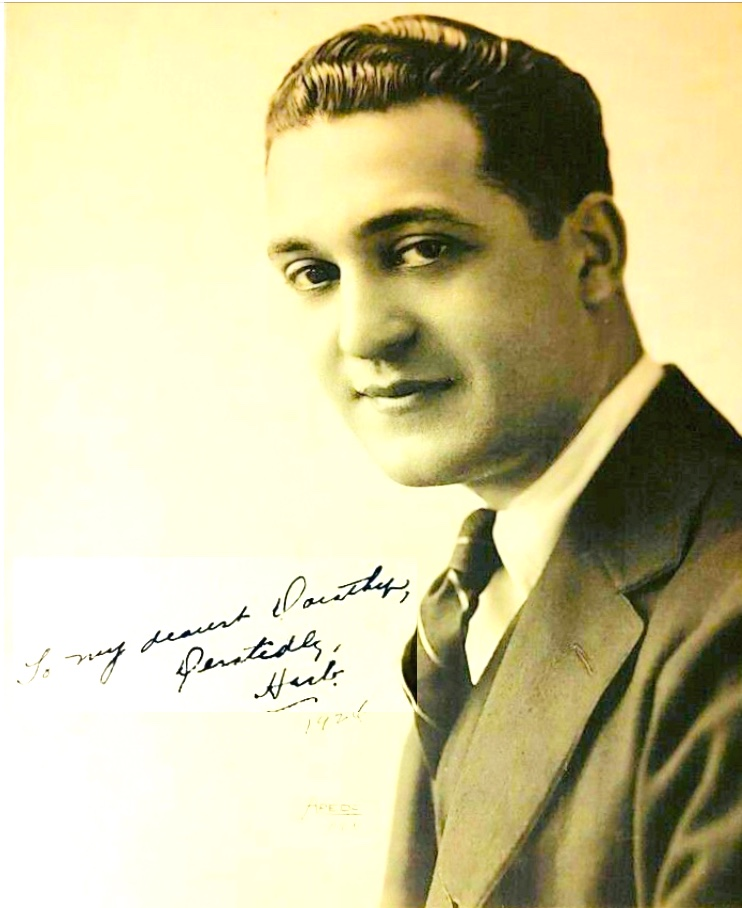
- Herbert Fields
- Born: July 26, 1897; New York City, New York
- Died: March 24, 1958 (aged 60); United States
- Occupations: Screenwriter, librettist
- Parent: Lew Fields
- Relatives: Dorothy Fields (sister); Joseph Fields (brother)

Herbert Fields (July 26, 1897 – March 24, 1958) was an American librettist and screenwriter.

== Biography ==
Born in New York City, Fields began his career as an actor, then graduated to choreography and stage direction before turning to writing. From 1925 until his death, he contributed to the libretti of many Broadway musicals. He wrote the book for most of the Rodgers and Hart musicals of the 1930s and later collaborated with his sister Dorothy on several musicals, including Annie Get Your Gun, Something for the Boys, Up in Central Park, and Arms and the Girl. Posthumously, he won a 1959 Tony Award for Best Musical for Redhead.

Fields wrote the screenplays for a string of mostly B-movies, including Let's Fall in Love (1933), Hands Across the Table (1935), Love Before Breakfast (1936), Fools for Scandal (1938), Honolulu (1939), and Father Takes a Wife (1941). He was also one of several writers who worked on The Wizard of Oz, although he did not receive a screen credit for his contribution.

Herbert Fields was the son of Lew Fields and brother of Dorothy and Joseph Fields. He attended Columbia University, where he participated in two Varsity Shows, including Fly With Me (1920), written by Rodgers and Hart. Herbert is a member of the American Theater Hall of Fame.

He never married and apparently lived comfortably as an openly gay man, at least within the worlds of Broadway and Hollywood. George Gershwin once wrote a letter to his brother Ira in which he mentions that he attended a party in NY and that “Herbie Fields was there with his (male) sweetheart”. And author Frederick Nolan tells us that, “Herb was part of the gay scene, but also always maintained the fiction of straightness. He had a string of statuesque chorus girls for whom he bought immensely ostentatious mink coats.”

== Additional theatre credits ==
- Dearest Enemy (1925)
- The Girl Friend (1926)
- Peggy-Ann (1926)
- Hit the Deck (1927)
- A Connecticut Yankee (1927)
- Present Arms (1928)
- Chee Chee (1928)
- Fifty Million Frenchmen (1929)
- The New Yorkers (1930)
- America's Sweetheart (1931)
- Pardon My English (1933)
- Du Barry Was a Lady (1939)
- Panama Hattie (1940)
- Let's Face It! (1941)
- Something for the Boys (1943)
- Mexican Hayride (1944)
- Up in Central Park (1945)
- Annie Get Your Gun (1946)
- Arms and the Girl (1950)
- By the Beautiful Sea (1954)
