= A Connecticut Yankee (musical) =

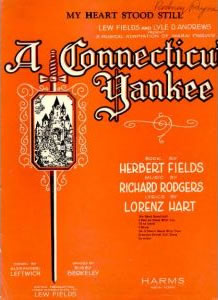
- Original 1927 sheet music
- Music: Richard Rodgers
- Lyrics: Lorenz Hart
- Book: Herbert Fields
- Basis: Mark Twain's novel A Connecticut Yankee in King Arthur's Court
- Premiere: 3 November 1927; 98 years ago: Vanderbilt Theatre, Manhattan
- Productions: 1927 Broadway; 1943 Broadway revival 1955 television 2001 New York concert

A Connecticut Yankee is a musical based on the 1889 novel A Connecticut Yankee in King Arthur's Court by American writer Mark Twain. Like most adaptations of the Twain novel, it focuses on the lighter aspects of the story. The music was written by Richard Rodgers, the lyrics by Lorenz Hart, and the book by Herbert Fields. It was produced by Lew Fields and Lyle D. Andrews. It enjoyed an original run on Broadway in 1927 of 421 performances and a number of revivals.

The 1931 film of the same name starring Will Rogers was not adapted from this musical, nor was the 1949 musical film A Connecticut Yankee in King Arthur's Court, which starred Bing Crosby. The Rodgers and Hart Connecticut Yankee, like many of the team's earlier musicals, has never been filmed for the big screen though a scene was staged for the 1948 biographical movie of the lives of Richard Rodgers and Lorenz Hart, Words and Music.

== Productions ==
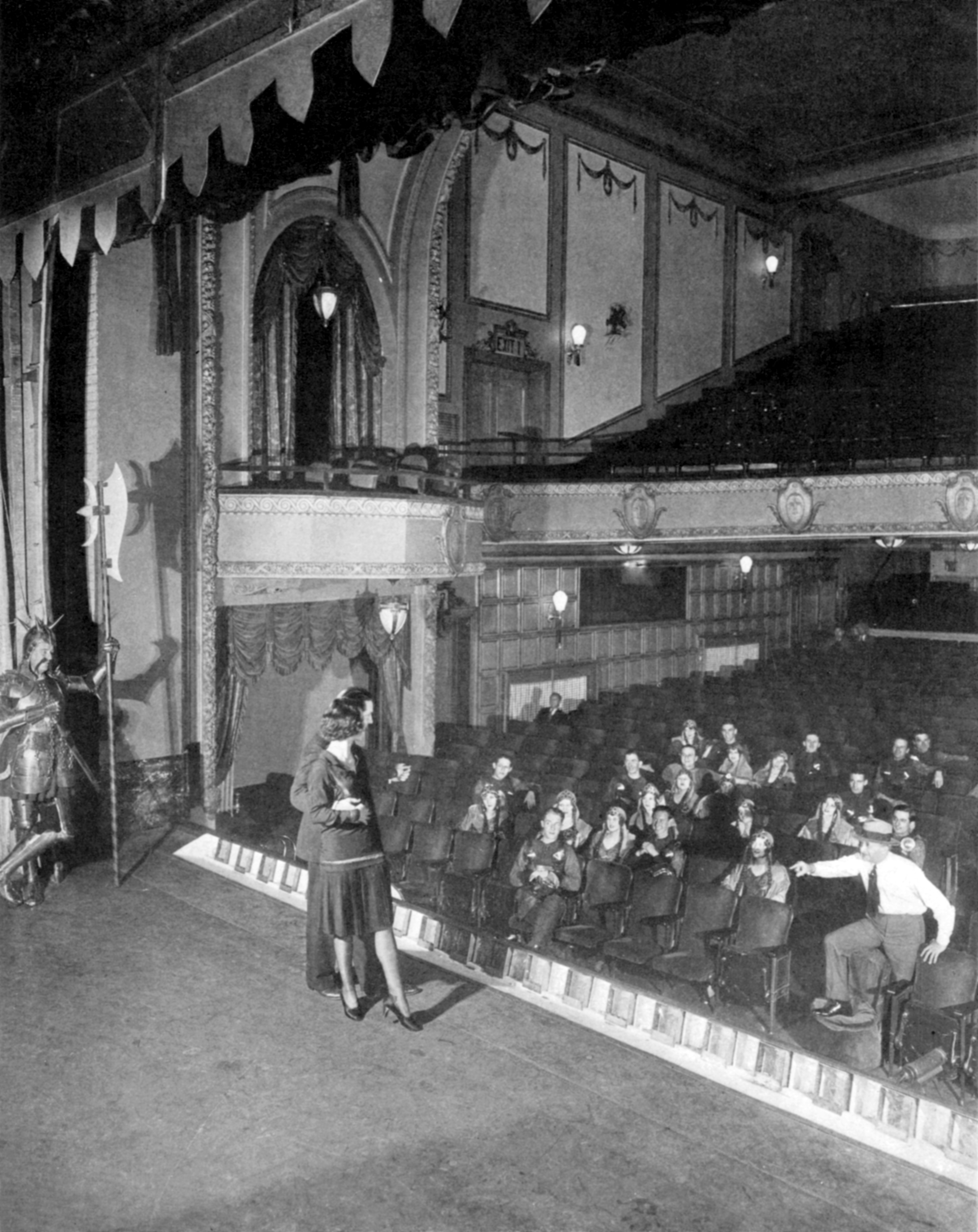
Constance Carpenter and William Gaxton, principals of the original Broadway production of A Connecticut Yankee, on stage at the Vanderbilt Theatre during a mid-run rehearsal of the hit musical (1928). Producer Lew Fields is seen at right, in shirtsleeves.

A Connecticut Yankee opened on Broadway at the Vanderbilt Theatre on November 3, 1927, and closed on October 27, 1928, running for 421 performances. Directed by Alexander Leftwich, with dances by Busby Berkeley, it starred William Gaxton (Martin, the Yankee), Constance Carpenter (Alice Carter/The Demoiselle Alisande la Carteloise), and June Cochrane (Mistress Evelyn Al Belle-Ans).

Retitled A Yankee at the Court of King Arthur, the show opened in London at Daly's Theatre, under the management of George Edwardes, on 10 October 1929, running for just 43 performances. Harry Fox starred as Martin, with Constance Carpenter as Alice. After closing in London the show toured the UK provinces in the spring of 1930. Additional numbers interpolated in the UK were by Desmond Carter, Vivian Ellis, H. M. Tennent, Percy Greenbank and others, and the piece now opened with a new Rodgers & Hart number, "A Ladies Home Companion".

A Broadway revival opened at the Martin Beck Theatre (now the Al Hirschfeld Theatre) on November 17, 1943, and closed on March 11, 1944, after 135 performances. Directed by John C. Wilson and choreographed by William Holbrook and Al White Jr., it featured Vivienne Segal (Lt. Merrill/Queen Morgan Le Fay), Dick Foran (Lt. Martin Barrett), Vera-Ellen (Mistress Evelyn Al Belle-Ans), and Robert Chisholm (Admiral Arthur/King Arthur of Britain).

A television adaptation was broadcast on NBC on March 12, 1955, with Eddie Albert, Janet Blair, Gale Sherwood, and Boris Karloff.

New York City Center Encores! presented a staged concert in 2001, with Christine Ebersole (Fay Morgan/Morgan Le Fay), Henry Gibson (Arthur Pendragos/King Arthur), Ron Leibman (Sir Launcelot) and Jessica Walter (Guinevere).

== Plot ==
In Connecticut in the 1920s, Martin is about to be married to Fay. When an old flame, Alice, visits him, Fay knocks him out with a champagne bottle in a jealous fit. As Martin dreams, he is seemingly in the court of King Arthur in 528 A.D. Dubbed "Sir Boss" by Arthur, Martin is directed to industrialize Camelot, which he does, including telephones and radios. He falls in love with "Demoiselle Alisande" ("Alice") but the king's evil sister, "Morgan Le Fay" ("Fay"), kidnaps her. As Martin rescues her, he wakes up and realizes that it was Alice that he loved all along.

=== Changes made to the 1943 revival ===
Rodgers and Hart revised the show for its 1943 revival, relocated to a more topical wartime setting, and show art depicting a knight and his damsel in a jeep. The updates turned Morgan Le Fay into a "singing sorceress" anti-heroine, and the song "To Keep My Love Alive" was written especially for the revival's star Vivienne Segal.

== Songs ==
Among the best remembered songs are the up-tempo duet "Thou Swell", the ballad "My Heart Stood Still", "On a Desert Island with Thee", and "I Feel at Home with You". Rodgers and Hart added several additional songs for the 1943 revival, including "Can't You Do a Friend a Favor?" and "To Keep My Love Alive", Hart's last song.

Act I

- "This Is My Night to Howl"—Fay Morgan and Ensemble
- "My Heart Stood Still"—Martin and Alice Carter
- "Thou Swell"—Martin and Alice Carter
- "At the Round Table"—The Company
- "On a Desert Island with Thee"—Mistress Evelyn Al Belle-Ans, Sir Galahad, Sir Gawain and Ensemble
- "To Keep My Love Alive" (1943 revival)—Queen Morgan Le Fay
- "My Heart Stood Still" (Reprise)—Martin and The Demoiselle Alisande la Carteloise

Act II

- "Ye Lunchtime Follies"—Sir Galahad and Ensemble
- "Can't You Do a Friend a Favor?" (1943 revival)—Queen Morgan Le Fay and Martin
- "Thou Swell" (Reprise)—Martin and The Demoiselle Alisande la Carteloise
- "I Feel At Home With You"—Sir Galahad, Mistress Evelyn Al Belle-Ans, Sir Gawain and Ensemble
- "You Always Love the Same Girl"—Martin and King Arthur of Britain
- "The Camelot Samba"—Sir Gawain and Ensemble

== Recordings ==
A recording of the 1943 revival was released by Decca on June 29, 1944.
