= Have You Met Miss Jones? =

1937 song by Richard Rodgers and Lorenz Hart

Song
- Published: 1937
- Composer: Richard Rodgers
- Lyricist: Lorenz Hart

"Have You Met Miss Jones?" is a popular song that was written for the musical comedy I'd Rather Be Right. The music was written by Richard Rodgers and the lyrics by Lorenz Hart. The song was published in 1937.

== Background ==
In the musical, the song is performed by characters Peggy Jones and Phil Barker. In the 1937 version these characters were played by Joy Hodges and Austin Marshall. George Shearing released a bebop version of "Have You Met Miss Jones?" in 1947, spurring a renewal of interest in the song. In the early 1950s, versions by Red Norvo (with Charles Mingus & Tal Farlow), Stan Getz, and Art Tatum cemented the success of the song as a jazz standard.

In the movie Gentlemen Marry Brunettes (1955), it is sung by Rudy Vallee, Jane Russell, Jeanne Crain (dubbed by Anita Ellis), Scott Brady (dubbed by Robert Farnon) and Alan Young, danced by Jane Russell and Jeanne Crain.

== Recordings ==
- Joe Rines and His Orchestra (1937)
- Benny Goodman with Teddy Wilson and Gene Krupa – Camel Caravan (1937)
- George Shearing – 1947
- Red Norvo with Charles Mingus and Tal Farlow – 1950
- Stan Getz – The Artistry of Stan Getz (1953)
- Bing Crosby – Bing Sings Whilst Bregman Swings (1956)
- Ella Fitzgerald – Ella Fitzgerald Sings the Rodgers & Hart Song Book (1956), replaces "Miss Jones" with "Sir Jones".
- Anita O'Day – Anita O'Day and Billy May Swing Rodgers and Hart (1960)
- Frank Sinatra - Swing Along With Me (1961)
- McCoy Tyner – Reaching Fourth (1963)
- Tony Bennett - Tony Bennett, Stan Getz & Friends (1964)
- Ahmad Jamal – Ahmad Jamal at the Top: Poinciana Revisited (1969)
- Joe Pass – Virtuoso (1973)
- Mel Tormé – for the album Velvet & Brass (1995)
- Robbie Williams – Bridget Jones's Diary (2001)

== See also ==
- List of 1930s jazz standards
