= Lover (Rodgers and Hart song) =

Song
- Released: 1932 by Famous Music
- Genre: Pop
- Composer: Richard Rodgers
- Lyricist: Lorenz Hart

"Lover" is a popular song composed by Richard Rodgers with lyrics by Lorenz Hart. It was sung in the movie Love Me Tonight (1932) by Jeanette MacDonald.

Popular recordings in 1933 were by Paul Whiteman and His Orchestra (vocal by Jack Fulton), Guy Lombardo and His Royal Canadians, and Greta Keller.

== Other notable recordings ==
- Stan Kenton – with Kai Winding (1940)
- Gene Krupa – 1945
- Harry James – released three live recordings of the song from the 1940s and 50s
- Les Paul – The New Sound (Capitol, 1950)
- Frank Sinatra – Sing and Dance with Frank Sinatra (1950) and Come Swing with Me! (1961)
- Peggy Lee – Lover (1952) and in the movie The Jazz Singer (1952)
- Charlie Parker – Big Band (1952)
- Bob Crosby with trombone solo by Jack Teagarden recorded October 1954 for Decca Records
- Yvette Giraud – French-language of the song (lyrics by Henri Contet), under the title "Partout Toi", was a hit in 1954
- Dave Brubeck – Jazz: Red Hot and Cool (1955)
- Sonny Stitt – Sonny Stitt Plays Arrangements from the Pen of Quincy Jones (1955)
- Johnny Dorelli - Songo Americano (1955)
- Ella Fitzgerald – Ella Fitzgerald Sings the Rodgers & Hart Song Book (1956))
- Max Roach – Jazz in 3/4 Time (1957)
- Gerry Mulligan - Paul Desmond Quartet – Gerry Mulligan - Paul Desmond Quartet - bonus track (1957)
- Anita O'Day – Anita O'Day and Billy May Swing Rodgers and Hart (1960)
- Cliff Richard – Listen to Cliff! (1961)
- Joni James – I'm Your Girl (1962)
- Brenda Lee – All Alone Am I(1963)
- John Coltrane – The Last Trane (1965)
- The Supremes – The Supremes Sing Rodgers & Hart (1967)
- Tony Bennett – Tony Bennett Sings 10 Rodgers and Hart Songs (1976)
- Kenny Garrett - Introducing Kenny Garrett (1985)
- Wynton Marsalis – Standard Time Vol. 2 (1990)
- Bill Charlap – S Wonderful (1998)
- Keely Smith – Keely Swings Basie-Style with Strings (2002)
- Margaret Whiting – recorded the song for Capitol
