= Thou Swell =

Song
- Published: 1927
- Composer: Richard Rodgers
- Lyricist: Lorenz Hart

"Thou Swell" is a 1927 show tune in popular-song style that became a jazz standard.

== History ==
The music was written by Richard Rodgers, with words by Lorenz Hart, for the 1927 musical A Connecticut Yankee. As indicated by its title, it mixes archaic English and modern slang as the story takes place in both contemporary times and in King Arthur's court.

== Recordings ==
- An early recorded version conducted by Ben Selvin (Columbia 1928) featured The Broadway Nitelites with Franklyn Baur on vocals.
- Blossom Dearie – Blossom Dearie (1957)
- The Supremes – The Supremes Sing Rodgers & Hart (1967)
- There are many other popular and jazz vocal renditions including those by Nat King Cole (and later Natalie Cole), Bing Crosby for his 1976 album At My Time of Life, Sarah Vaughan, Frank Sinatra, Eydie Gormé, Ella Fitzgerald, Rita Reys, and Joe Williams.
- Bix Beiderbecke, Fats Waller, Harry James, J.J.Johnson and Billy May all recorded instrumental versions.
- In Words and Music (1948), an MGM Technicolor biopic about Rodgers and Hart, June Allyson sings and dances to Thou Swell with twin "knights" in a medieval-style setting.
- An instrumental version was recorded April 29, 1954 in Oslo on the 78 rpm record Musica RA-9005 with "Perdido" on the B side. The record featured "Verden Rundt's" All Star Band with Rowland Greenberg, trumpet; A. Skjold, trombone; K. Stokke, alto sax; K. Bergheim, tenor sax; Knut Hyrum, baritone sax; I. Børsum, bass; Scott Lunde, piano; and K. O. Hoff, drums. Music was arranged and conducted by Egil Monn-Iversen.

== Popular culture ==
- A piano instrumental is featured in All About Eve (1950) at the party when Margo tells her friends to "fasten their seat belts."
