= Lorenz Hart =

American lyricist (1895–1943)

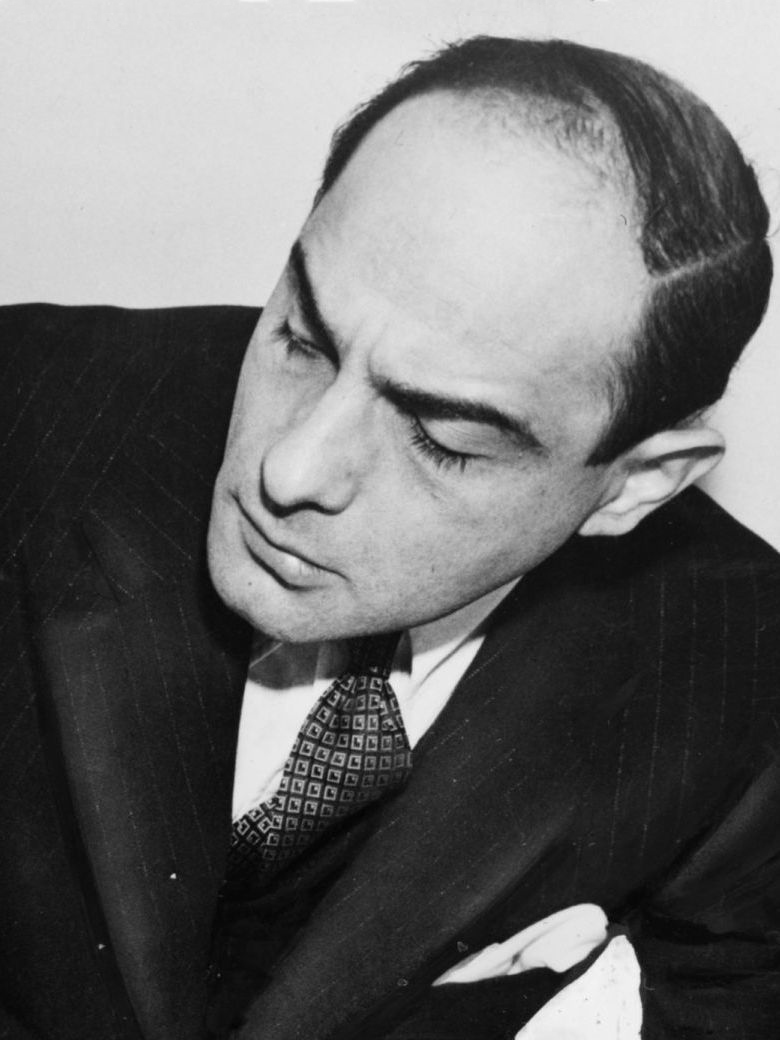
- Hart in 1936

Background information
- Born: Lorenz Milton Hart; May 2, 1895; New York City, U.S.
- Died: November 22, 1943 (aged 48) New York City, U.S.
- Genre: Musical theatre
- Occupation: Lyricist
- Years active: 1919–1943

Lorenz Milton Hart (May 2, 1895 – November 22, 1943) was an American lyricist and half of the Broadway songwriting team Rodgers and Hart. Some of his more famous lyrics include "Blue Moon"; "The Lady Is a Tramp"; "Manhattan"; "Bewitched, Bothered and Bewildered"; and "My Funny Valentine".

== Early life and education ==
Lorenz Milton Hart was born on May 2, 1895 in Harlem, New York City, the elder of two sons, to German Jewish immigrant parents, Max M. and Frieda (née Isenberg) Hart. Through his mother, he was a great-grandnephew of the German poet Heinrich Heine. His father, a business promoter, sent Hart and his brother to private schools. (His brother, Teddy Hart, also went into theatre and became a musical comedy star. Teddy Hart's wife, Dorothy Hart, wrote a biography of Lorenz Hart.)

Hart's exposure to theater began through his parents, who took him to Yiddish and German theater productions in New York. When they were old enough, Hart and his brother attended the theater on their own. Precociously well read, he published poems and fiction in student publications and at summer camp wrote comedic revues for fellow campers.

Hart received his early education at Columbia Grammar School and entered Columbia College in 1913, graduating in 1918. From 1914 to 1916, he also spent two years at Columbia University School of Journalism. While he had no special interest in becoming a journalist, he was drawn to the school's steady requirement of writing. While at Columbia, he also took a class in dramatic technique.

== Career ==
By 1918, Hart was working for the Shubert brothers, partners in theatre, translating German play songs into English. In 1919, a friend introduced him to Richard Rodgers, and the two joined forces to write songs for a series of amateur and student productions. That year, his and Rodgers's song "Any Old Place With You" was included in the Broadway musical comedy A Lonely Romeo. In 1920, six of their songs were used in the musical comedy Poor Little Ritz Girl, which also had music by Sigmund Romberg. They were hired to write the score for the 1925 Theatre Guild production The Garrick Gaieties, the success of which brought them acclaim.

Rodgers and Hart subsequently wrote the music and lyrics for 26 Broadway musicals during a partnership of more than 20 years that ended shortly before Hart's death. Their "big four" were Babes in Arms, The Boys from Syracuse, Pal Joey, and On Your Toes. The Rodgers and Hart songs have been described as intimate and destined for long lives outside the theater. Many of them are standard repertoire for singers and jazz musicians. Hart has been called "the expressive bard of the urban generation which matured during the interwar years". But the "encomiums suggest[ing] that Larry Hart was a poet" caused his friend and fellow writer Henry Myers to say otherwise: "Larry in particular was primarily a showman. If you can manage to examine his songs technically, and for the moment elude their spell, you will see that they are all meant to be acted, that they are part of a play. Larry was a playwright."

Rodgers and Hart wrote music and lyrics for several films, including Love Me Tonight (1932), The Phantom President (1932), Hallelujah, I'm a Bum (1933), and Mississippi (1935). With their successes, during the Great Depression Hart was earning $60,000 annually, and he became a magnet for many people. He gave numerous large parties. Beginning in 1938, he traveled more often and suffered from his ongoing drinking. Nevertheless, Rodgers and Hart continued working together through mid-1942, with their final new musical being 1942's By Jupiter.

The New York Times reported on July 23, 1942: "The Theatre Guild announced yesterday that Richard Rodgers, Lorenz Hart and Oscar Hammerstein II will soon begin work on a musical version of Lynn Riggs's folk-play, Green Grow the Lilacs, which the Guild produced for sixty-four performances at the Guild Theatre in 1931." Rodgers had brought Hammerstein onto the project due to Hart's skepticism that the play could be adapted into a musical. Hart said he had difficulty writing a musical for such a rural setting as Oklahoma. He was not alone in this assessment. Jerome Kern had also been offered the project and was equally doubtful that the play, which had run only 64 performances, would succeed as a musical. Disappointed at Hart's refusal, Rodgers turned to Hammerstein. Complicating this was Hart's worsening mental state and exhaustion after his work on By Jupiter. This left an eager Hammerstein to complete what became Oklahoma! Rodgers and Hammerstein continued to collaborate for 16 years (until Hammerstein died, in 1960), a partnership that made them one of the most successful composing teams of the 20th century.

After the success of Oklahoma! in 1943, Rodgers decided that he and Hart should reunite for a revival of their successful 1927 musical A Connecticut Yankee. Hart composed new lyrics for many of the songs in anticipation of the revival's November 17, 1943 premiere at the Martin Beck Theatre. Six new numbers, including "To Keep My Love Alive", were written for this reworked version of the play; it was Hart's last lyric.

== Lyrical style ==
According to Thomas Hischak, Hart "had a remarkable talent for polysyllabic and internal rhymes", and his lyrics have often been praised for their wit and technical sophistication.

Writer, composer, and critic Anthony Burgess singled out Hart as among the first to use polysyllabic rhyme not to be humorous but as a source of wit and insight: "wit in the service of frustration or neurosis." In Burgess's view, Hart was also among the early practitioners of a more colloquial, conversational style of lyric writing for musical theater: "The effect is of a very conversational declaration, which by the happiest of accidents, has rhymes in it."

According to music critic Stephen Holden, "Many of Hart's ballad lyrics conveyed a heart-stopping sadness that reflected his conviction that he was physically too unattractive to be lovable." Holden also wrote, "In his lyrics, as in his life, Hart stands as a compellingly lonely figure. Although he wrote dozens of songs that are playful, funny and filled with clever wordplay, it is the rueful vulnerability beneath their surface that lends them a singular poignancy."

== Personal life and death ==
Screenwriter Robert Kaplow said Hart was "so uncomfortable in his own skin that the way he probably got through life was he knew he had to be the funniest, smartest guy in the room". His alcoholism sometimes led to weeks-long disappearances on drinking binges. Hart lived with his widowed mother, Frieda, until her death in April 1943. Devastated by her loss, he sank deeper into melancholy and died seven months later.

Hart's erratic behavior was often the cause of friction between him and Rodgers and led Rodgers to team with lyricist Oscar Hammerstein II in 1942. On March 31, 1943, Hart attended the Broadway premiere of Rodgers and Hammerstein's Oklahoma! Hart briefly appeared at the opening night party at Sardi's and told Rodgers, "This is one of the greatest shows I've ever seen, and it'll be playing twenty years from now!" He left with his mother immediately afterward, saying she was tired.

Many of Hart's contemporaries who knew him socially said he was a discreet homosexual, with a reputation as a voyeur.

Robert Gottlieb wrote in the April 2013 edition of The Atlantic magazine:

There were rumors about Larry [Lorenz Hart] while he was alive, but nothing about his sexuality ever appeared in print. One night in Los Angeles, in 1933, someone from a Hollywood trade magazine approached Dick [Richard Rodgers] at a party and said, "I've got to ask you something about Larry ... Is it true Larry's a fairy?" Dick grabbed him by the collar, [biographer Gary] Marmorstein recounts, and said, "I never heard that. And if you print it, I'll kill you."

On the opening night of the Broadway revival of A Connecticut Yankee, Hart showed up drunk. His condition was noticed by his sister-in-law, and she persuaded him to accompany her to her Manhattan home. Sometime after they arrived, Hart left, venturing into cold weather to resume drinking. A friend of Hart's found him sitting on the curb in front of a bar he favored on Manhattan's Eighth Avenue. Hart was shivering, and the friend accompanied him to a hospital, where it was determined that Hart had developed pneumonia from exposure. On November 22, 1943, about four days after admission to the hospital, he died.

Hart is buried in Mount Zion Cemetery in Queens County, New York.

== In popular culture ==
The circumstances of Hart's life were heavily altered and romanticized in the 1948 MGM biopic Words and Music, in which he was portrayed by Mickey Rooney. The film contains fictitious personal details such as changing his sexual orientation and attributing his erratic behavior and depression to an obsession with a woman, played by Betty Garrett, who turns down his marriage proposal.

The 2025 film Blue Moon is set during Hart's last days, mostly around Sardi's Restaurant on March 31, 1943, on the opening night of Oklahoma! Written by Robert Kaplow, the film is directed by Richard Linklater and stars Ethan Hawke as Hart and Andrew Scott as Rodgers. Hawke was nominated for the Academy Award for Best Actor for his portrayal of Hart.

== Selected stage works ==
- 1920 Fly with Me
- 1920 Poor Little Ritz Girl
- 1925 The Garrick Gaieties
- 1925 Dearest Enemy
- 1926 The Girl Friend
- 1926 Peggy-Ann
- 1926 The Garrick Gaieties (2nd Edition)
- 1927 A Connecticut Yankee, based on the Mark Twain novel A Connecticut Yankee in King Arthur's Court
- 1928 Present Arms
- 1930 Simple Simon
- 1935 Jumbo
- 1936 On Your Toes
- 1937 Babes in Arms
- 1937 I'd Rather Be Right
- 1938 The Boys from Syracuse, based on William Shakespeare's The Comedy of Errors
- 1938 I Married an Angel
- 1939 Too Many Girls
- 1940 Higher and Higher
- 1940 Pal Joey, based on John O'Hara's novel Pal Joey
- 1942 By Jupiter

== Notable songs ==
- "A Ship Without a Sail"
- "Bewitched, Bothered and Bewildered"
- "Blue Moon"
- "Blue Room"
- "Dancing on the Ceiling"
- "Falling in Love with Love"
- "Glad to Be Unhappy"
- "Have You Met Miss Jones?"
- "He Was Too Good to Me"
- "I Could Write a Book"
- "I Didn't Know What Time It Was"
- "I Wish I Were in Love Again"
- "I'll Tell the Man in the Street"
- "I've Got Five Dollars"
- "Isn't It Romantic?"
- "It Never Entered My Mind"
- "It's Easy to Remember"
- "Johnny One Note"
- "Little Girl Blue"
- "Lover"
- "Manhattan"
- "Mountain Greenery"
- "My Funny Valentine"
- "My Heart Stood Still"
- "My Romance"
- "Sing for Your Supper"
- "Spring Is Here"
- "Ten Cents a Dance"
- "The Lady Is a Tramp"
- "The Most Beautiful Girl in the World"
- "There's a Small Hotel"
- "This Can't Be Love"
- "Thou Swell"
- "To Keep My Love Alive"
- "Wait till You See Her"
- "Where or When"
- "With a Song in My Heart"
- "You Took Advantage of Me"
