= Carner =

Carner is a surname. Notable people with the surname include:

- Jaime Carner (1867–1934), Spanish lawyer, businessman and politician
- Joan Reventós i Carner (1927–2004), the 10th President of the Parliament of Catalonia (1995–1999)
- JoAnne Carner (born 1939), former American professional golfer
- Josep Carner (1884–1970), Spanish Catalan poet, journalist, playwright and translator
- Loyle Carner (born 1994), stage name of Benjamin Gerard Coyle-Larner, English hip-hop musician
- Lucy Perkins Carner (1886–1983), American sociologist, pacifist
- Mosco Carner (1904–1985), British musicologist of Austrian birth

Fictional characters:

- Rocco Carner, fictional character from the American soap opera The Bold and the Beautiful, portrayed by Bryan Genesse

== See also ==
- Carner and Gregor, American musical theatre writing team
