= Other People's Bodies =

2025 American LGBTQ+ dramedy film

- Theatrical film poster
- Directed by: Alan Brown
- Written by: Alan Brown
- Based on: La Piscine (1969) directed by Jacques Deray
- Produced by: Jacob Bittens
- Starring: Annie Parisse; A.J. Shively; McKinley Belcher III; Jasai Chase-Owens; Julienne Hazelka-Kim; Adam Jepsen
- Cinematography: Derek McKane
- Edited by: Phillip Vernon
- Music by: Nicholas Wright
- Release dates: October 11, 2025 (NewFest); April 7, 2026 (USA)
- Running time: 85 minutes
- Country: United States
- Language: English

Other People's Bodies is a 2025 American LGBTQ+ dramedy film, directed and written by Alan Brown. The film stars Annie Parisse, A.J. Shively, McKinley Belcher III, Jasai Chase-Owens, Adam Jepsen, and Julienne Hazelka-Kim. It premiered at the New York Lesbian, Gay, Bisexual, & Transgender Film Festival in 2025, before a streaming release later the following year.

== Synopsis ==
A queer reimagining of the French classic La Piscine (1969), in which four former friends and lovers reunite on a hot summer weekend, reigniting long-simmering passions, grievances, and regrets.

== Cast ==
- Annie Parisse as Olivia
- A.J. Shively as Seb
- McKinley Belcher III as Mateo
- Jasai Chase-Owens as Zaki
- Julienne Hanzelka-Kim as Gabriella
- Adam Jepsen as Fabian

== Reception ==
Marlon Wallace of WBOC-TV criticized the lack of clarity but praised the cinematography: "There's an extreme tactile quality here, touching something solid. It's not about ephemeral things, so to leave the why of what Seb did as an ephemeral things feels unsatisfying. Yet, it is beautifully acted and beautifully photographed." The American Institute of Bisexuality praised the film: "[The film] is a surprisingly meditative, quiet, observant film about a bi man's past and how he comes to terms with his present. As such, it deserves recognition among modern queer films."
