= Richard Rodgers =

American composer (1902–1979)

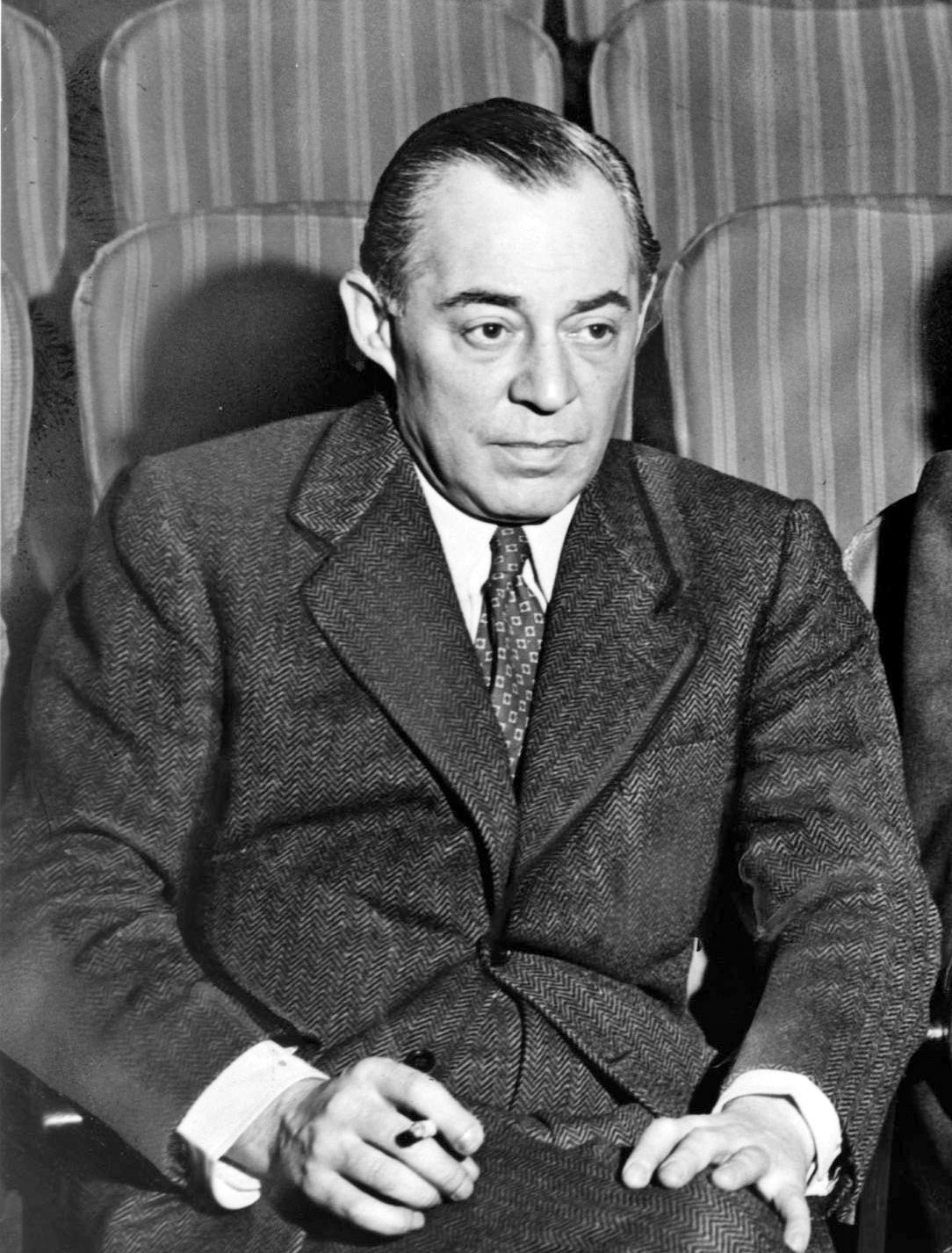
- Rodgers at the St. James Theatre in 1948

Background information
- Born: Richard Charles Rodgers; June 28, 1902; New York City, U.S.
- Died: December 30, 1979 (aged 77) New York City, U.S.
- Genre: Musical theater
- Occupations: Composer; songwriter; playwright
- Years active: 1919–1979
- Education: Columbia University (BA); Juilliard School

Richard Charles Rodgers (June 28, 1902 – December 30, 1979) was an American composer who worked primarily in musical theater. With 43 Broadway musicals and over 900 songs to his credit, Rodgers was one of the best-known American composers of the 20th century, and his work significantly influenced popular music.

Rodgers is known for his songwriting partnerships, first with lyricist Lorenz Hart and then with Oscar Hammerstein II. With Hart he wrote musicals throughout the 1920s and 1930s, including Pal Joey, A Connecticut Yankee, On Your Toes, and Babes in Arms. With Hammerstein he wrote musicals in the 1940s and 1950s, such as Oklahoma!, Flower Drum Song, Carousel, Cinderella, South Pacific, The King and I, and The Sound of Music. His collaborations with Hammerstein, in particular, are celebrated for bringing the Broadway musical to new maturity by telling stories that focus on characters and drama rather than the genre's earlier light-hearted entertainment.

Rodgers was the first person to win all four of the top American entertainment awards in theater, film, recording, and television—an Emmy, a Grammy, an Oscar, and a Tony—now known collectively as an EGOT. He also won a Pulitzer Prize, making him the first person to receive all five awards. In 1978, Rodgers was in the inaugural group of Kennedy Center Honorees for lifetime achievement in the arts.

== Early life ==
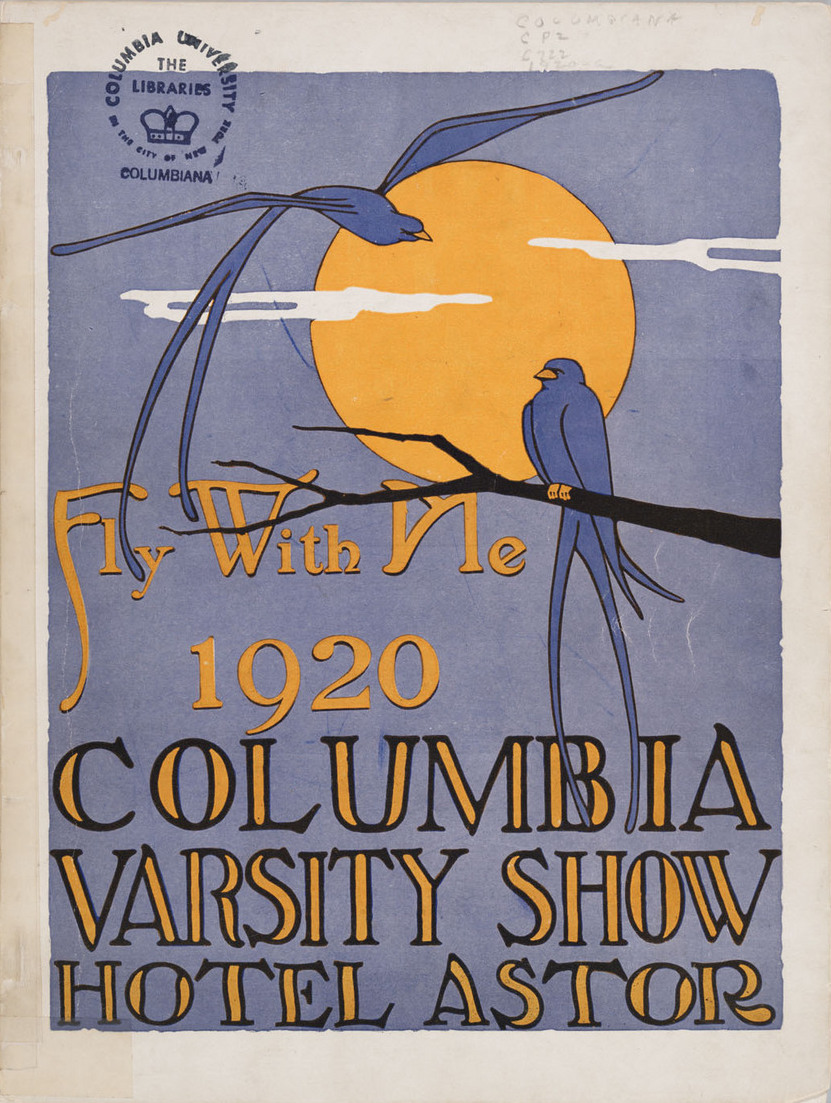
The poster for Fly With Me, the 1920 Columbia University Varsity Show. The music was co-written by Rodgers and Lorenz Hart, and also included songs by Oscar Hammerstein II, making the show one of the first collaborations between the two men.

Rodgers was born into a Jewish family in Queens, New York, the son of William Abrahams Rodgers, a prominent physician who had changed the family name from Rogazinsky, and Mamie Rodgers (née Levy). He began playing the piano at age six. He attended P.S. 166, Townsend Harris Hall, and DeWitt Clinton High School. Rodgers spent his early teenage summers at Camp Wigwam in Waterford, Maine, where he composed some of his first songs.

Rodgers, Lorenz Hart, and Oscar Hammerstein II all attended Columbia University. At Columbia, Rodgers joined the Pi Lambda Phi fraternity. In 1921, he transferred to the Institute of Musical Art (which later became the Juilliard School) to study music composition. Rodgers was influenced by composers such as Victor Herbert and Jerome Kern, as well as by the operettas his parents took him to see on Broadway when he was a child.

== Career ==
=== Rodgers and Hart ===
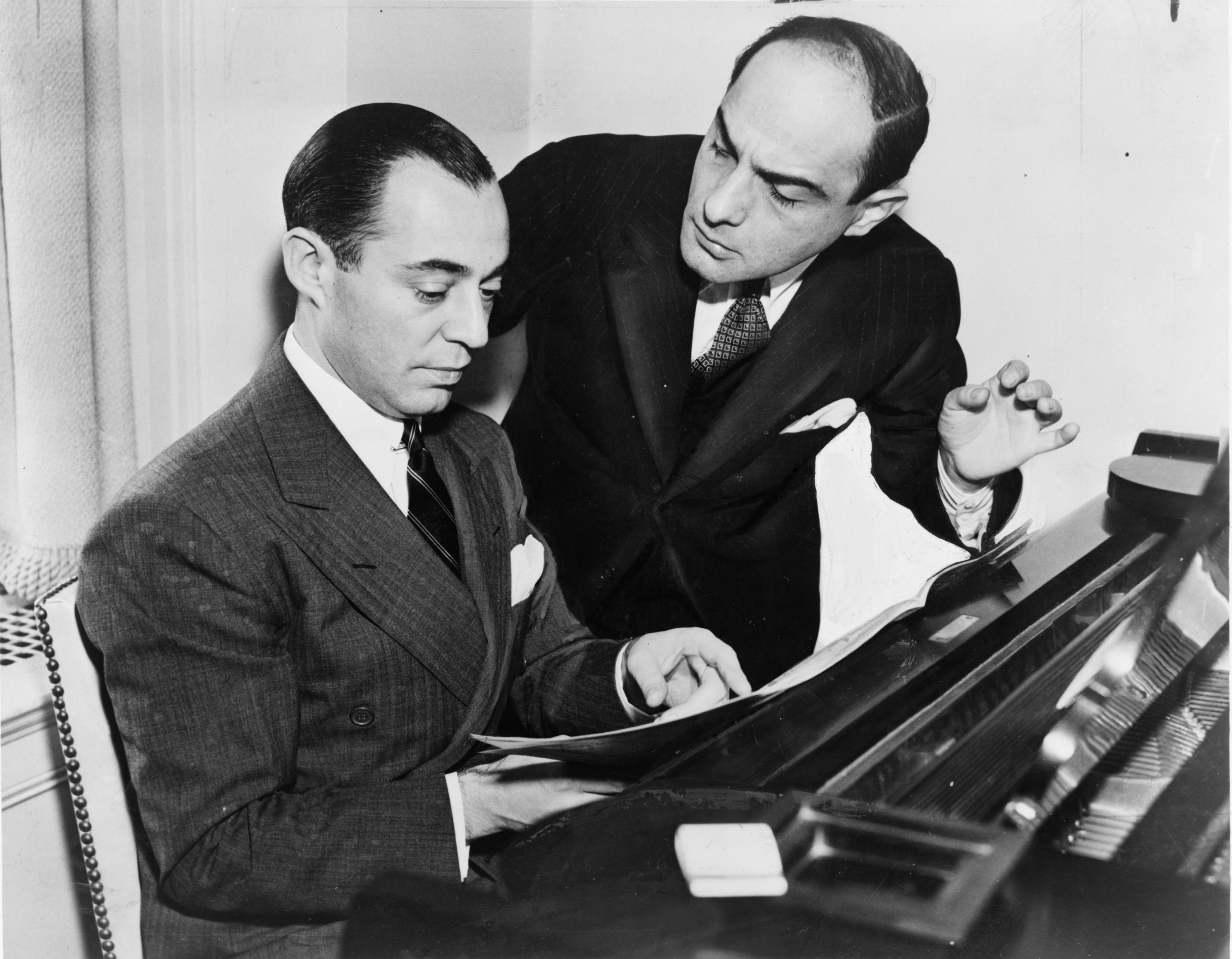
Richard Rodgers (seated) with Lorenz Hart in 1936

In 1919, Rodgers met Lorenz Hart, thanks to Phillip Levitt, a friend of Rodgers's older brother. Rodgers and Hart struggled for years in the field of musical comedy, writing several amateur shows. They made their professional debut with the song "Any Old Place With You", featured in the 1919 Broadway musical comedy A Lonely Romeo. Their first professional production was Poor Little Ritz Girl (1920), which also had music by Sigmund Romberg. Their next professional show, The Melody Man, did not premiere until 1924.

When he was just out of college Rodgers worked as musical director for Lew Fields. Among the stars he accompanied were Nora Bayes and Fred Allen. Rodgers was considering quitting show business altogether to sell children's underwear when he and Hart finally broke through in 1925. They wrote the songs for a benefit show presented by the prestigious Theatre Guild called The Garrick Gaieties, and critics found the show fresh and delightful. Although it was meant to run only one day, the Guild knew it had a success and allowed it to reopen later. The show's biggest hit—the song that Rodgers believed "made" Rodgers and Hart—was "Manhattan". The two were now a Broadway songwriting force.

During the rest of the decade, the duo wrote several hit shows for both Broadway and London, including Dearest Enemy (1925), The Girl Friend (1926), Peggy-Ann (1926), A Connecticut Yankee (1927), and Present Arms (1928). Their 1920s shows produced standards such as "Here in My Arms", "Mountain Greenery", "Blue Room", "My Heart Stood Still", and "You Took Advantage of Me".

With the Depression in full swing during the first half of the 1930s, the team sought greener pastures in Hollywood. The hardworking Rodgers later regretted these relatively fallow years, but he and Hart wrote some classic songs and film scores out west, including Love Me Tonight (1932) (directed by Rouben Mamoulian, who later directed Rodgers's Oklahoma! on Broadway), which introduced three standards: "Lover", "Mimi", and "Isn't It Romantic?". Rodgers also wrote a melody for which Hart wrote three consecutive lyrics that were either cut, not recorded or not a hit. The fourth lyric resulted in one of their most famous songs, "Blue Moon". Other film work includes the scores to The Phantom President (1932), starring George M. Cohan, Hallelujah, I'm a Bum (1933), starring Al Jolson, and, in a quick return after having left Hollywood, Mississippi (1935), starring Bing Crosby and W. C. Fields.

In 1935, they returned to Broadway and wrote an almost unbroken string of hit shows that ended shortly before Hart's death in 1943. Among the most notable are Jumbo (1935), On Your Toes (1936, which included the ballet "Slaughter on Tenth Avenue", choreographed by George Balanchine), Babes in Arms (1937), I Married an Angel (1938), The Boys from Syracuse (1938), Pal Joey (1940), and their last original work, By Jupiter (1942). Rodgers also contributed to the book on several of these shows.

Many of the songs from these shows are still sung and remembered, including "The Most Beautiful Girl in the World", "My Romance", "Little Girl Blue", "I'll Tell the Man in the Street", "There's a Small Hotel", "Where or When", "My Funny Valentine", "The Lady Is a Tramp", "Falling in Love with Love", "Bewitched, Bothered and Bewildered", and "Wait till You See Her".

In 1939, Rodgers wrote the ballet Ghost Town for the Ballet Russe de Monte Carlo, with choreography by Marc Platoff.

=== Rodgers and Hammerstein ===
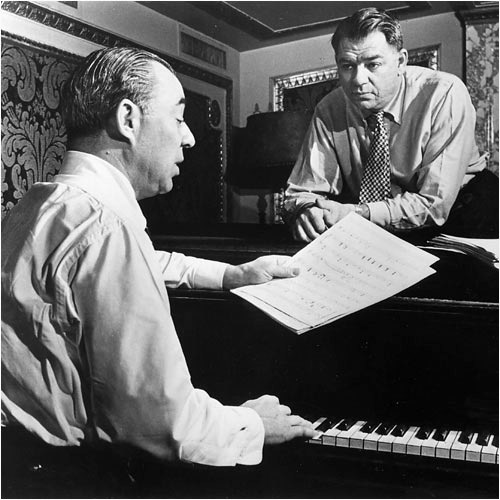
Rodgers (seated) with Hammerstein, 1945

Rodgers's partnership with Hart began to founder because of Hart's unreliability and declining health from alcoholism. Rodgers began working again with Oscar Hammerstein II, with whom he had written songs before ever working with Hart. Their first musical, the groundbreaking hit Oklahoma! (1943), is a notable example of a "book musical", a musical play in which the songs and dances are fully integrated into the plot. What was once a collection of songs, dances, and comic turns held together by a tenuous plot became a fully integrated narrative. Show Boat is considered the earliest example of a book musical, but Oklahoma! epitomized its innovations and is considered the first production in U.S. history to be intentionally marketed as a fully integrated musical.

In 1943, Rodgers became the ninth president of the Dramatists Guild of America. In November 1943, he and Hart mounted a revival of A Connecticut Yankee; Hart died from alcoholism and pneumonia just days after its opening.

Rodgers and Hammerstein wrote four more hits that are among the most popular in musical history. Each was made into a successful film: Carousel (1945), South Pacific (1949, winner of the 1950 Pulitzer Prize for Drama), The King and I (1951), and The Sound of Music (1959). Other shows include the minor hit Flower Drum Song (1958) and the relative failures Allegro (1947), Me and Juliet (1953), and Pipe Dream (1955). They also wrote the score to the film State Fair (1945, remade in 1962 with Pat Boone) and a special TV musical of Cinderella (1957).

Their collaboration produced many well-known songs, including "Oh, What a Beautiful Mornin'", "People Will Say We're in Love", "Oklahoma" (which became Oklahoma's state song), "It's a Grand Night for Singing", "If I Loved You", "You'll Never Walk Alone", "It Might as Well Be Spring", "Some Enchanted Evening", "Younger Than Springtime", "Bali Hai", "Getting to Know You", "My Favorite Things", "The Sound of Music", "Sixteen Going on Seventeen", "Climb Ev'ry Mountain", "Do-Re-Mi", and "Edelweiss", Hammerstein's last song.

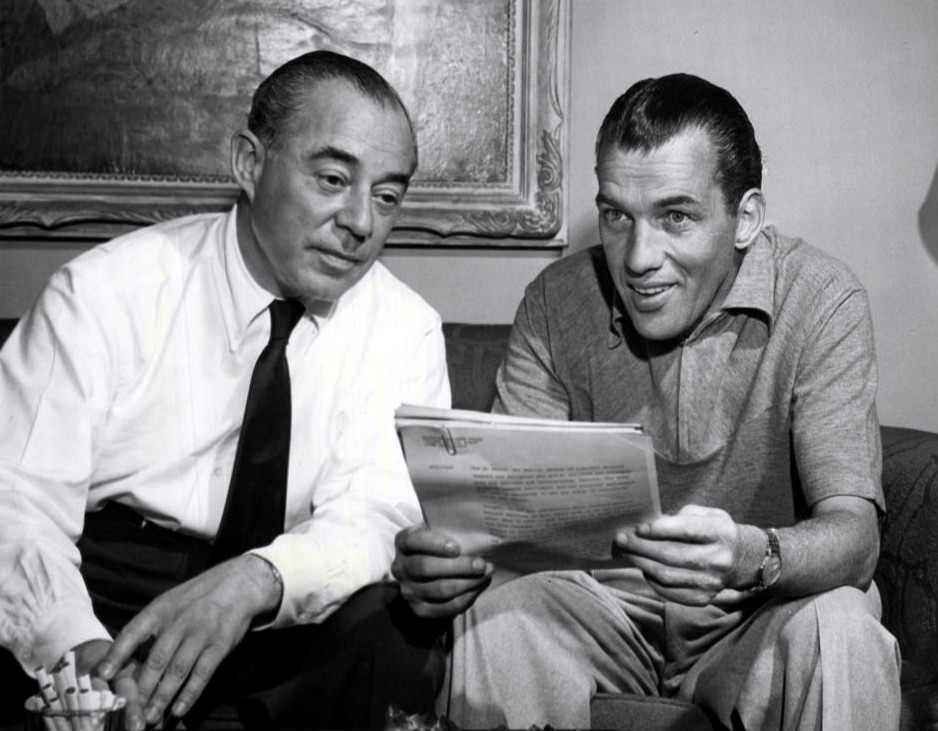
Rodgers was the subject of a two-part special on Ed Sullivan's Toast of the Town television show in 1952

Much of Rodgers's work with Hart and Hammerstein was orchestrated by Robert Russell Bennett. Rodgers composed 12 themes that Bennett used in preparing the orchestra score for the 26-episode World War II television documentary Victory at Sea (1952–53). This NBC production pioneered the "compilation documentary"—programming based on preexisting footage—and was broadcast in dozens of countries. The melody of the popular song "No Other Love" was later taken from the Victory at Sea theme "Beneath the Southern Cross". Rodgers won an Emmy for the music for the ABC documentary Winston Churchill: The Valiant Years, scored by Eddie Sauter, Hershy Kay, and Robert Emmett Dolan. He composed the theme music, "March of the Clowns", for the 1963–64 television series The Greatest Show on Earth, which ran for 30 episodes, and contributed the main title theme for the 1963–64 historical anthology television series The Great Adventure.

In 1950, Rodgers and Hammerstein received The Hundred Year Association of New York's Gold Medal Award "in recognition of outstanding contributions to the City of New York." Rodgers, Hammerstein, and Joshua Logan won the Pulitzer Prize for Drama for South Pacific. Rodgers and Hammerstein had won a special Pulitzer Prize in 1944 for Oklahoma!.

In 1954, Rodgers conducted the New York Philharmonic Orchestra in excerpts from Victory at Sea, Slaughter on Tenth Avenue, and the Carousel Waltz for a special LP released by Columbia Records.

Rodgers and Hammerstein musicals earned a total of 37 Tony Awards, 15 Academy Awards, two Pulitzer Prizes, two Grammy Awards, and two Emmy Awards.

=== After Hammerstein ===
Rodgers composed five more musicals after Hammerstein's death in 1960: No Strings (1962), Do I Hear a Waltz? (1965), Two by Two (1970), Rex (1976), and I Remember Mama (1979).

Rodgers wrote both words and music for No Strings, which earned two Tony Awards and played 580 shows. The show was a minor hit and featured the song "The Sweetest Sounds".

Rodgers also wrote both the words and music for two new songs used in the film version of The Sound of Music. (Other songs in the film are by Rodgers and Hammerstein.)

Rodgers's final Broadway musicals had declining success as Rodgers was overshadowed by up-and-coming composers and lyricists. This was evident by the steady drop in run times and critic reviews. Do I Hear a Waltz? ran 220 performances; Two by Two, 343; Rex, only 49; and I Remember Mama, 108. Rodgers worked with lyricists Stephen Sondheim (Do I Hear a Waltz?), a protégé of Hammerstein; Martin Charnin (Two by Two, I Remember Mama); and Sheldon Harnick (Rex), but never found another permanent partner. Sondheim's reluctance to participate in Do I Hear a Waltz? led to tension between the two. Charnin and Rodgers had opposing ideas when creating Two by Two.

At its 1978 commencement ceremonies, Barnard College awarded Rodgers its highest honor, the Barnard Medal of Distinction. Also in 1978, Rodgers was an honoree at the first Kennedy Center Honors. At the 1979 Tony Awards ceremony (six months before his death), he received the Lawrence Langner Memorial Award for Distinguished Lifetime Achievement in the American Theatre.

One of Rodgers's final works was a revival of Fly with Me for the 1980 Varsity Show, to which he added several new songs. He died less than four months before its premiere in April 1980.

== Personal life ==
In 1930, Rodgers married Dorothy Belle Feiner. Their first daughter, Mary, composed Once Upon a Mattress and wrote children's books. The Rodgerses later lost a daughter at birth. Their youngest daughter, Linda, also had a brief career as a songwriter. Mary Rodgers's book Shy: The Alarmingly Outspoken Memoirs of Mary Rodgers was published posthumously in 2022, and includes frank revelations and assessments of her father, family, and herself. Both Mary's and Linda's sons are also musical theater composers. Mary's son, Adam Guettel, won Tony Awards for Best Score and Best Orchestrations for The Light in the Piazza in 2005. Peter Melnick, Linda's son, is the composer of Adrift In Macao, which debuted at the Philadelphia Theatre Company in 2005 and was produced Off-Broadway in 2007.

Rodgers was an atheist. He was prone to depression and alcohol abuse, and was at one time hospitalized.

Tom Drake portrayed Rodgers in the Metro-Goldwyn-Mayer film Words and Music, a semi-fictionalized depiction of the partnership of Rodgers and Hart. In Richard Linklater's 2025 film Blue Moon, he is played by Andrew Scott, who won the Silver Bear for Best Supporting Performance at the 75th Berlin International Film Festival.

=== Death ===
Rodgers died at his home in Manhattan on December 30, 1979, at the age of 77, after surviving cancer of the jaw, a heart attack, and a laryngectomy. He was cremated, and his ashes were scattered at sea.

== Legacy ==
In 1990, the 46th Street Theatre was renamed the Richard Rodgers Theatre in his memory. In 1999, Rodgers and Hart were each commemorated on U.S. postage stamps. In 2002, the centennial year of Rodgers's birth was celebrated worldwide with books, retrospectives, performances, new recordings of his music, and a Broadway revival of Oklahoma!. The BBC Proms devoted an entire evening to Rodgers's music, including a concert performance of Oklahoma!, and the Boston Pops Orchestra released the CD My Favorite Things: A Richard Rodgers Celebration.

Alec Wilder wrote:

Of all the writers whose songs are considered and examined in this book, those of Rodgers show the highest degree of consistent excellence, inventiveness, and sophistication ... after spending weeks playing his songs, I am more than impressed and respectful: I am astonished.

In 2003, PS 166 on Manhattan's Upper West Side was renamed The Richard Rodgers School of The Arts and Technology.

Rodgers is a member of the American Theater Hall of Fame.

Along with the Academy of Arts and Letters, Rodgers also started and endowed an award for non-established musical theater composers to produce new productions either by way of full productions or staged readings. It is the only award for which the Academy of Arts and Letters accepts applications and is presented every year. Below are the previous winners of the award:

| Year | Show | Awardee |
|---|---|---|
| 2018 | Gun and Powder | Ross Baum |
| 2018 | Gun and Powder | Angelica Chéri |
| 2018 | KPOP | Jason Kim |
| 2018 | KPOP | Helen Park |
| 2018 | KPOP | Max Vernon |
| 2018 | KPOP | Woodshed Collective |
| 2017 | What I Learned from People | Will Aronson |
| 2017 | What I Learned from People | Hue Park |
| 2016 | We Live in Cairo | Patrick Lazour |
| 2016 | We Live in Cairo | Daniel Lazour |
| 2016 | Costs of Living | Timothy Huang |
| 2016 | Hadestown | Anaïs Mitchell |
| 2015 | String | Adam Gwon |
| 2015 | String | Sarah Hammond |
| 2014 | Witness Uganda | Matthew Gould |
| 2014 | Witness Uganda | Griffin Matthews |
| 2013 | Natasha, Pierre & The Great Comet of 1812 | Dave Malloy |
| 2013 | The Kid Who Would Be Pope | Tom Megan |
| 2013 | The Kid Who Would Be Pope | Jack Megan |
| 2012 | Witness Uganda | Matthew Gould |
| 2012 | Witness Uganda | Griffin Matthews |
| 2011 | Dogfight | Peter Duchan |
| 2011 | Dogfight | Benj Pasek |
| 2011 | Dogfight | Justin Paul |
| 2011 | Gloryana | Andrew Gerle |
| 2010 | Buddy's Tavern | Raymond De Felitta |
| 2010 | Buddy's Tavern | Alison Louise Hubbard |
| 2010 | Buddy's Tavern | Kim Oler |
| 2010 | Rocket Science | Patricia Cotter |
| 2010 | Rocket Science | Jason Rhyne |
| 2010 | Rocket Science | Stephen Weiner |
| 2009 | Cheer Wars | Karlan Judd |
| 2009 | Cheer Wars | Gordon Leary |
| 2009 | Rosa Parks | Scott Ethier |
| 2009 | Rosa Parks | Jeff Hughes |
| 2008 | Alive at Ten | Kirsten A. Guenther |
| 2008 | Alive at Ten | Ryan Scott Oliver |
| 2008 | Kingdom | Aaron Jafferis |
| 2008 | Kingdom | Ian Williams |
| 2008 | See Rock City and Other Destinations | Brad Alexander |
| 2008 | See Rock City and Other Destinations | Adam Mathias |
| 2007 | Calvin Berger | Barry Wyner |
| 2007 | Main-Travelled Roads | Dave Hudson |
| 2007 | Main-Travelled Roads | Paul Libman |
| 2006 | Grey Gardens | Scott Frankel |
| 2006 | Grey Gardens | Michael Korie |
| 2006 | Grey Gardens | Doug Wright |
| 2006 | True Fans | Chris Miller |
| 2006 | True Fans | Bill Rosenfield |
| 2006 | True Fans | Nathan Tysen |
| 2006 | Yellow Wood | Michelle Elliott |
| 2006 | Yellow Wood | Danny Larsen |
| 2005 | Broadcast | Nathan Christensen |
| 2005 | Broadcast | Scott Murphy |
| 2005 | Dust & Dreams: Celebrating Sandburg | David Hudson |
| 2005 | Dust & Dreams: Celebrating Sandburg | Paul Libman |
| 2005 | Red | Brian Lowdermilk |
| 2005 | Red | Marcus Stevens |
| 2004 | To Paint the Earth | Daniel Frederick Levin |
| 2004 | To Paint the Earth | Jonathan Portera |
| 2004 | The Tutor | Andrew Gerle |
| 2004 | The Tutor | Maryrose Wood |
| 2004 | Unlocked | Sam Carner |
| 2004 | Unlocked | Derek Gregor |
| 2003 | The Devil in the Flesh | Jeffrey Lunden |
| 2003 | The Devil in the Flesh | Arthur Perlman |
| 2003 | Once Upon a Time in New Jersey | Susan DiLallo |
| 2003 | Once Upon a Time in New Jersey | Stephen A. Weiner |
| 2003 | The Tutor | Andrew Gerle |
| 2003 | The Tutor | Maryrose Wood |
| 2002 | The Fabulist | David Spencer |
| 2002 | The Fabulist | Stephen Witkin |
| 2002 | The Tutor | Andrew Gerle |
| 2002 | The Tutor | Maryrose Wood |
| 2001 | Heading East | Leon Ko |
| 2001 | Heading East | Robert Lee |
| 2001 | The Spitfire Grill | Fred Alley |
| 2001 | The Spitfire Grill | James Valcq |
| 2000 | Bat Boy | Kaythe Farley |
| 2000 | Bat Boy | Brian Flemming |
| 2000 | Bat Boy | Laurence O'Keefe |
| 2000 | The Bubbly Black Girl Sheds Her Chameleon Skin | Kirsten Childs |
| 2000 | Suburb | Robert S. Cohen |
| 2000 | Suburb | David Javerbaum |
| 1999 | Bat Boy | Kaythe Farley |
| 1999 | Bat Boy | Brian Flemming |
| 1999 | Bat Boy | Laurence O'Keefe |
| 1999 | Blood on the Dining Room Floor | Jonathan Sheffer |
| 1999 | The Bubbly Black Girl Sheds Her Chameleon Skin | Kirsten Childs |
| 1999 | Dream True: My Life with Vernon Dexter | Ricky Ian Gordon |
| 1999 | Dream True: My Life with Vernon Dexter | Tina Landau |
| 1999 | The Singing | Lenora Champagne |
| 1999 | The Singing | Daniel Levy |
| 1998 | Little Women | Alison Hubbard |
| 1998 | Little Women | Allan Knee |
| 1998 | Little Women | Kim Oler |
| 1998 | Summer | Erik Haagensen |
| 1998 | Summer | Paul Schwartz |
| 1997 | The Ballad of Little Jo | Mike Reid |
| 1997 | The Ballad of Little Jo | Sarah Schlesinger |
| 1997 | Barrio Babies | Fernand Rivas |
| 1997 | Barrio Babies | Luis Santeiro |
| 1997 | Violet | Brian Crawley |
| 1997 | Violet | Jeanine Tesori |
| 1996 | Bobos | James McBride |
| 1996 | Bobos | Ed Shockley |
| 1996 | The Hidden Sky | Kate Chisholm |
| 1996 | The Hidden Sky | Peter Foley |
| 1996 | The Princess & the Blac | Andy Chuckerman |
| 1996 | The Princess & the Blac | Karole Foreman |
| 1995 | Spendora | Mark Campbell |
| 1995 | Spendora | Stephen Hoffman |
| 1995 | Spendora | Peter Webb |
| 1994 | Doll (not produced) | Scott Frankel |
| 1994 | Doll (not produced) | Michael Korie |
| 1994 | The Gig | Douglas Cohen |
| 1994 | Rent | Jonathan Larson |
| 1994 | The Sweet Revenge of ... | Mark Campbell |
| 1994 | The Sweet Revenge of ... | Burton Cohen |
| 1994 | The Sweet Revenge of ... | Stephen Hoffman |
| 1993 | Allos Makar | Scott Frankel |
| 1993 | Allos Makar | Michael Korie |
| 1993 | Allos Makar | Valeria Vasilevsky |
| 1993 | Avenue X | John Jiler |
| 1993 | Avenue X | Ray Leslee |
| 1993 | Christina Alberta's | Polly Pen |
| 1993 | They Shoot Horses ... | Nagle Jackson |
| 1993 | They Shoot Horses ... | Robert Sprayberry |
| 1992 | Avenue X | John Jiler |
| 1992 | Avenue X | Ray Leslee |
| 1992 | The Molly Maquires | Sid Cherry |
| 1992 | The Molly Maquires | William Strempek |
| 1991 | Opal | Robert N. Lindsey |
| 1991 | The Times | Joe Keenan |
| 1991 | The Times | Brad Ross |
| 1990 | Down the Stream | Michael Goldenberg |
| 1990 | Swamp Gas and Shallow Feelings | Randy Buck |
| 1990 | Swamp Gas and Shallow Feelings | Shirlee Strother |
| 1990 | Swamp Gas and Shallow Feelings | Jack E. Williams |
| 1990 | Whatnot | Howard Crabtree |
| 1990 | Whatnot | Dick Gallagher |
| 1990 | Whatnot | Mark Waldrop |
| 1989 | Juan Darien | Elliot Goldenthal |
| 1989 | Juan Darien | Julie Taymor |
| 1988 | Lucky Stiff | Lynn Ahrens |
| 1988 | Lucky Stiff | Stephen Flaherty |
| 1988 | Sheila Levine is Dead ... | Michael Devon |
| 1988 | Sheila Levine is Dead ... | Todd Graff |
| 1988 | Superbia | Jonathan Larson |
| 1987 | Henry and Ellen | Michael John LaChiusa |
| 1987 | Lucky Stiff | Lynn Ahrens |
| 1987 | Lucky Stiff | Stephen Flaherty |
| 1987 | No Way to Treat A Lady | Douglas J. Cohen |
| 1986 | Break/Agnes/Eulogy | Michael John LaChiusa |
| 1986 | Juba | Wendy Lamb |
| 1986 | Juba | Russell Walden |
| 1984 | Brownstone | Andrew Cadiff |
| 1984 | Brownstone | Peter Larson |
| 1984 | Brownstone | Josh Rubens |
| 1984 | Papushko | Andrew Teirstein |
| 1982 | Portrait of Jennie | Enid Futterman |
| 1982 | Portrait of Jennie | Howard Marren |
| 1982 | Portrait of Jennie | Dennis Rosa |
| 1981 | Child of the Sun | Damien Leake |
| 1980 | Nine (not produced) | Maro Fratti |
| 1980 | Nine (not produced) | Maury Yeston |

=== Relationship with performers ===
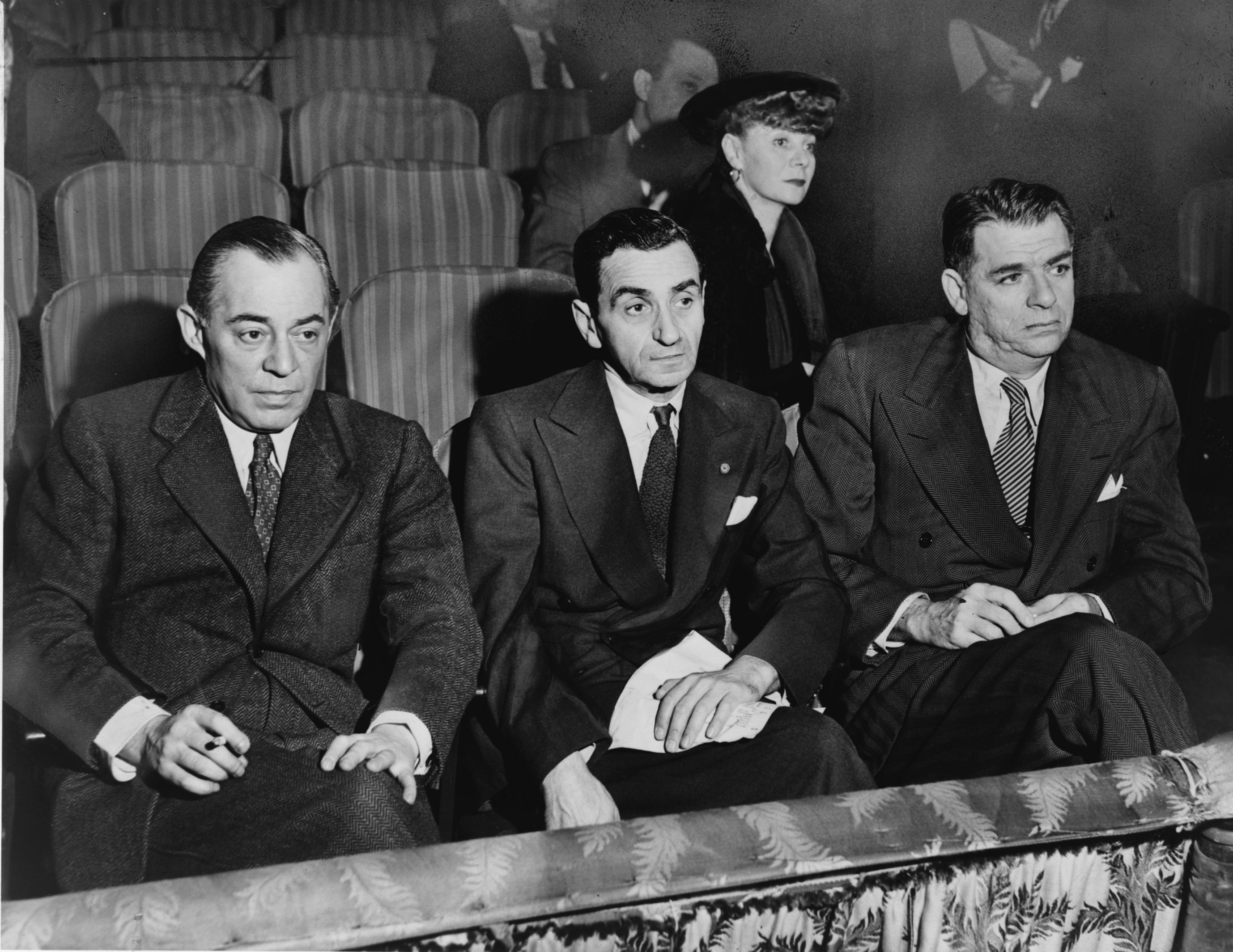
Richard Rodgers, Irving Berlin, Oscar Hammerstein II, and Helen Tamiris watching hopefuls who are being auditioned on stage of the St. James Theatre.

Rosemary Clooney recorded a version of "Falling in Love with Love" by Rodgers, using a swing style. After the recording session, Rodgers pointedly told her that it should be sung as a waltz. After Doris Day recorded "I Have Dreamed" in 1961, he wrote to her and her arranger, Jim Harbert, that theirs was the most beautiful rendition of his song he had ever heard.

After Peggy Lee recorded her version of "Lover", a Rodgers song, in a dramatically different arrangement from his, Rodgers said, "I don't know why Peggy picked on me; she could have fucked up Silent Night". Mary Martin said Rodgers composed songs for her for South Pacific, knowing she had a small vocal range, and the songs generally made her look her best. She also said that Rodgers and Hammerstein listened to all her suggestions and she worked extremely well with them. Both Rodgers and Hammerstein wanted Doris Day for the lead in the film version of South Pacific and she reportedly wanted the part. They discussed it with her, but after her manager/husband Martin Melcher would not budge on his demand for a high salary for her, the role went to Mitzi Gaynor.

== Awards and nominations ==
Rodgers is the first entertainer to have won the EGOT (Emmy, Grammy, Oscar, and Tony).

| Year | Award | Category | Nominated work | Results | Ref. |
|---|---|---|---|---|---|
| 1945 | Academy Awards | Best Song | "It Might as Well Be Spring" (from State Fair) | Won | |
| 1958 | Grammy Awards | Best Original Cast Album (Broadway or TV) | Flower Drum Song | Nominated | |
| 1958 | Grammy Awards | Best Original Cast Album (Broadway or TV) | Victory at Sea: Vol II | Nominated | |
| 1958 | Grammy Awards | Best Musical Composition First Recorded and Released in 1958 (Over 5 Minutes Duration) | Victory at Sea: Vol II | Nominated | |
| 1960 | Grammy Awards | Best Show Album (Original Cast) | The Sound of Music | Won | |
| 1962 | Grammy Awards | Song of the Year | "The Sweetest Sounds" | Nominated | |
| 1962 | Grammy Awards | Best Original Cast Show Album | No Strings | Won | |
| 1965 | Grammy Awards | Best Score from an Original Cast Show Album | Do I Hear a Waltz? | Nominated | |
| 1971 | Grammy Awards | Best Score from an Original Cast Show Album | Two by Two | Nominated | |
| 1976 | Grammy Awards | Best Cast Show Album | Rex | Nominated | |
| 1989 | Grammy Awards | Trustees Award | —N/a | Won | |
| 1978 | Kennedy Center Honors | —N/a | —N/a | Honored | |
| 1958 | Primetime Emmy Awards | Best Musical Contribution for Television | Cinderella | Nominated | |
| 1962 | Primetime Emmy Awards | Outstanding Achievement in Original Music Composed for Television | Winston Churchill: The Valiant Years | Won | |
| 1944 | Pulitzer Prize | Special Citations and Awards | Oklahoma! | Won | |
| 1950 | Pulitzer Prize | Drama | South Pacific | Won | |
| 1950 | Tony Awards | Best Musical | South Pacific | Won | |
| 1950 | Tony Awards | Producers (Musical) | South Pacific | Won | |
| 1950 | Tony Awards | Best Score | South Pacific | Won | |
| 1952 | Tony Awards | Best Musical | The King and I | Won | |
| 1956 | Tony Awards | Best Musical | Pipe Dream | Nominated | |
| 1959 | Tony Awards | Best Musical | Flower Drum Song | Nominated | |
| 1960 | Tony Awards | Best Musical | The Sound of Music | Won (Note: Tied with Fiorello!.) | |
| 1962 | Tony Awards | Best Musical | No Strings | Nominated | |
| 1962 | Tony Awards | Best Composer | No Strings | Won | |
| 1962 | Tony Awards | Special Tony Award | No Strings | Won | |
| 1965 | Tony Awards | Best Composer and Lyricist | Do I Hear a Waltz? | Nominated | |
| 1972 | Tony Awards | Special Tony Award | —N/a | Won | |
| 1979 | Tony Awards | Lawrence Langner Memorial Award | —N/a | Won | |
| 1996 | Tony Awards | Best Original Score | State Fair | Nominated | |

== Shows with music by Rodgers ==
=== Lyrics by Lorenz Hart ===
- One Minute Please (1917)
- Fly with Me (1920)
- Poor Little Ritz Girl (1920)
- The Melody Man (1924)
- The Garrick Gaieties (1925–26)
- Dearest Enemy (1925)
- The Girl Friend (1926)
- Peggy-Ann (1926)
- Betsy (1926)
- A Connecticut Yankee (1927)
- She's My Baby (1928)
- Present Arms (1928)
- Chee-Chee (1928)
- Spring Is Here (1929)
- Heads Up! (1929)
- Ever Green (1930)
- Simple Simon (1930)
- America's Sweetheart (1931)
- Love Me Tonight (1932)
- Jumbo (1935)
- On Your Toes (1936)
- Babes in Arms (1937)
- I'd Rather Be Right (1937)
- I Married an Angel (1938)
- The Boys from Syracuse (1938)
- Too Many Girls (1939)
- Higher and Higher (1940)
- Pal Joey (1940–41)
- By Jupiter (1942)
- A Connecticut Yankee Revival (1943)
- Rodgers & Hart (1975), Rodgers and Hart revue musical

=== Lyrics by Oscar Hammerstein II ===
- Oklahoma! (1943)
- Carousel (1945)
- State Fair (1945) (film)
- Allegro (1947)
- South Pacific (1949)
- The King and I (1951)
- Me and Juliet (1953)
- Pipe Dream (1955)
- Cinderella (1957) (television)
- Flower Drum Song (1958)
- The Sound of Music (1959)
- A Grand Night for Singing (1993), Rodgers and Hammerstein revue musical
- State Fair (1996) (stage musical)

=== Other lyricists and solo works ===
- Ghost Town (1939) (ballet)
- Victory at Sea (1952) (arrangements and orchestration by Robert Russell Bennett)
- The Valiant Years (1960)
- No Strings (1962) (lyrics also by Rodgers)
- Do I Hear a Waltz? (1965) (lyrics by Stephen Sondheim)
- Androcles and the Lion (TV) (1967) (lyrics also by Rodgers)
- Two by Two (1970) (lyrics by Martin Charnin)
- Rex (1976) (lyrics by Sheldon Harnick)
- I Remember Mama (1979) (lyrics by Martin Charnin/Raymond Jessel)

== See also ==
- List of atheists in music
