= Denis O'Hare filmography =

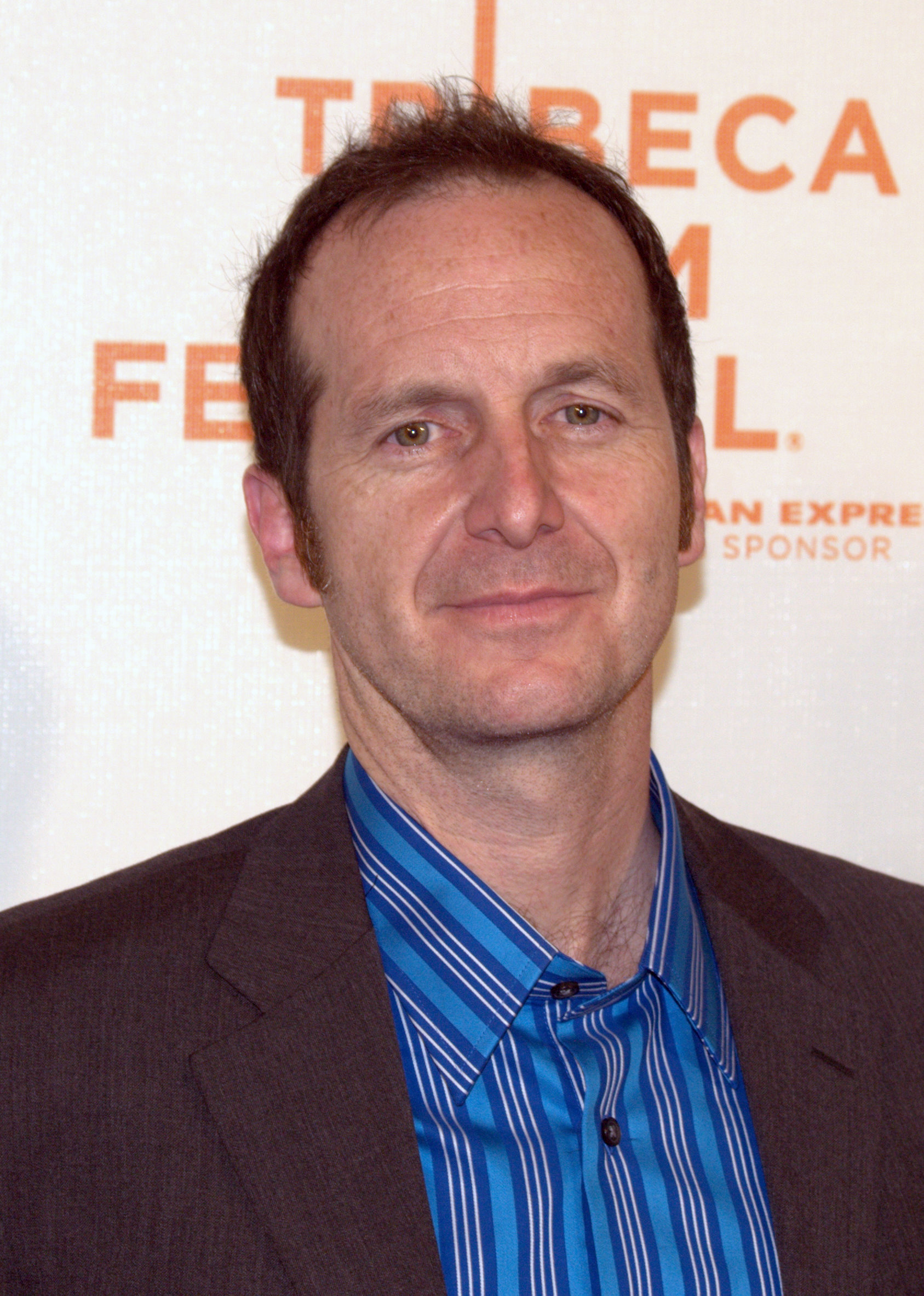
O'Hare at the 2009 Tribeca Film Festival for the premiere of An Englishman in New York

The filmography of Denis O'Hare comprises both film and television roles. In a career spanning over three decades, he has appeared in overall 34 feature films, seven television movies and eighteen television series. For his performance in the first season of American Horror Story, he was nominated for the Primetime Emmy Award for Outstanding Supporting Actor in a Miniseries or a Movie in 2012. As part of the ensemble cast in the films Milk and Dallas Buyers Club, he was nominated for the Screen Actors Guild Award for Outstanding Performance by a Cast in a Motion Picture.

In addition to his screen appearances, O'Hare has also starred in multiple productions within the theater arts. For his performances in Take Me Out and Assassins, he won the Tony Award for Best Featured Actor in a Play and was nominated for the Tony Award for Best Featured Actor in a Musical, respectively.

== Film ==
Year	Title	Role	Notes
1997	St. Patrick's Day	Russell	
1998	River Red	Father	
1999	Sweet and Lowdown	Jake	
2001	The Anniversary Party	Ryan Rose	
2003	21 Grams	Dr. Rothberg	
2004	Garden State	Albert	Cameo appearance
2005	Derailed	Jerry the Lawyer	
2005	Heights	Andrew	
2006	Stick It	Pharmacist	
2006	Half Nelson	Jimbo	
2006	Stephanie Daley	Frank	
2007	Rocket Science	Doyle Hefner	
2007	A Mighty Heart	John Bussey	
2007	Trainwreck: My Life as an Idiot	Mike Nichols	
2007	Michael Clayton	Mr. Greer	
2007	The Babysitters	Stan Lyner	
2007	Awake	Financial News Analyst	
2007	Charlie Wilson's War	CIA Station Chief Harold Holt	
2008	Pretty Bird	Chuck Stutters	
2008	Baby Mama	Dr. Manheim	
2008	Changeling	Dr. Jonathan Steele	
2008	Quarantine	Randy	
2008	Milk	John Briggs	
2009	The Proposal	Mr. Gilbertson	
2009	Duplicity	Duke Monahan	
2009	An Englishman in New York	Phillip Steele	
2009	Brief Interviews with Hideous Men	A / Subject #3	
2010	Edge of Darkness	Moore	
2011	The Eagle	Centurion Lutorius	
2011	J. Edgar	Albert S. Osborn	
2013	C.O.G.	Jon	
2013	Dallas Buyers Club	Dr. Sevard	
2014	The Judge	Doc Morris	
2014	The Pyramid	Dr. Miles Holden	
2014	The Town That Dreaded Sundown	Charles B. Pierce	
2016	From Nowhere	Isaac	
2016	Army of One	Agent Doss	
2017	Novitiate	Archbishop McCarthy	
2017	Allure	William	
2018	Private Life	Dr. Dordick	
2018	Lizzie	John Morse	
2018	The Parting Glass	Danny	Also writer and producer
2018	Danger One	Craddock	
2019	Late Night	Brad	
2019	The Day Shall Come	Andy Mudd	
2019	Swallow	William Erwin	
2019	Bottom of the 9th	Officer Lonergan	
2019	The Goldfinch	Lucius Reeve	
2020	Delete History	The American billionnaire	
2020	The Postcard Killings	Simon Haysmith	
2022	Infinite Storm	Dave	
2024	The Price of Money: A Largo Winch Adventure	Dwight Cochrane	
TBA	The Last Mrs. Parrish †	TBA	Post-production
TBA	On Était des Loups †	TBA	Post-production

== Television ==
Year	Title	Role	Notes
1993–2003	Law & Order	Harold Morrissey / James Smith / Phil Christie / Father Richard Hogan	Guest roles; 4 episodes
1993	The Young Indiana Jones Chronicles	Keating	Episode: "Paris, May 1919"
1994	New York Undercover	Carson	Episode: "Sins of the Father"
1995	The Wright Verdicts	Doyle	Episode: "Unlucky Star"
1998	Saint Maybe	Reverend Emmett	Television film
2000	Hamlet	Osric	Television film
2000; 2013	Law & Order: Special Victims Unit	Jimmy Walp / Father Shea	Episode: "The Third Guy", "Presumed Guilty"
2001–02	100 Centre Street	Lou	Guest role; 3 episodes
2005	Angel Rodriguez	Henry	Television film
2005	Once Upon a Mattress	Prince Dauntless	Television film
2006	Justice	Larry Bowers	Episode: "Death Spiral"
2007–09	Brothers & Sisters	Travis March	Recurring role; 12 episodes
2007–10	American Experience	Henry Lee / Benjamin Latrobe	Episodes: "Alexander Hamilton", "Dolley Madison"
2007	CSI: Crime Scene Investigation	Tom Michaels	Episode: "Who and What?"
2008	Law & Order: Criminal Intent	Father Shea	Episode: "Last Rites"
2008	The Tower	Richard March	Television film
2009	Maggie Hill	Milo Marcus	Television film
2009–10	CSI: Miami	Evan Talbot	Guest role; 3 episodes
2009–16	The Good Wife	Judge Charles Abernathy	9 episodes
2009	Bored to Death	Dr. David Worth	Episode: "The Case of the Missing Screenplay"
2010–12	True Blood	Russell Edgington	Main role; 20 episodes
2010	American Experience	Benjamin Latrobe	Episode: "Dolley Madison"
2011	American Horror Story: Murder House	Larry Harvey	Main role; 8 episodes
2013–14	American Horror Story: Coven	Otis Spalding Van Wirt	Main role; 10 episodes
2014–15	American Horror Story: Freak Show	Stanislaus 'Stanley' Spencer	Main role; 10 episodes
2014	Rake	Graham Murray	Episode: "Cannibal"
2014	The Normal Heart	Hiram Keebler	Television film
2015–16	American Horror Story: Hotel	Liz Taylor	Main role; 11 episodes
2015	Banshee	Special Agent Robert Phillips	Episode: "A Fixer of Sorts"
2015	The Comedians	Denis Grant	Recurring role; 5 episodes
2016–18	This Is Us	Jessie	Recurring role; 4 episodes
2016	American Horror Story: Roanoke	William van Henderson	Main role; 5 episodes
2017–21	The Good Fight	Judge Charles Abernathy	Guest role; 3 episodes
2017	Broad City	Terry	Episode: "Friendiversary"
2017	RuPaul's Drag Race	Himself	Episode: "Snatch Game"
2017	When We Rise	Jim Foster	Episode: "Part 1"
2019	Big Little Lies	Ira Farber	Recurring role; 4 episodes
2020	Dr. Seuss' The Grinch Musical Live!	Old Max	Television special
2020–22	The Accidental Wolf	Dean	Guest role; 3 episodes
2021	American Gods	Týr / Dr. Tyrell	Guest roles; 3 episodes
2021	American Horror Story: Double Feature	Holden Vaughn	Recurring role; 4 episodes
2021–23	The Nevers	Dr. Edmund Hague	Main role; 10 episodes
2022	American Horror Stories	Samuel Van Wirt	Episode: "Dollhouse"
2022	Trying	Leo	Guest role; 2 episodes
2022	American Horror Story: NYC	Henry Grant	Main role; 6 episodes
2023–24	American Horror Story: Delicate	Dr. Andrew Hill	Main role; 6 episodes
2024	Evil	Father Giovanni De Vita	Guest role; 2 episodes
2026	The Boroughs	Wally Bakers	Main role; 8 episodes
TBA	Kennedy †	Raymond Furness	Recurring role; post-production

== Theatre ==
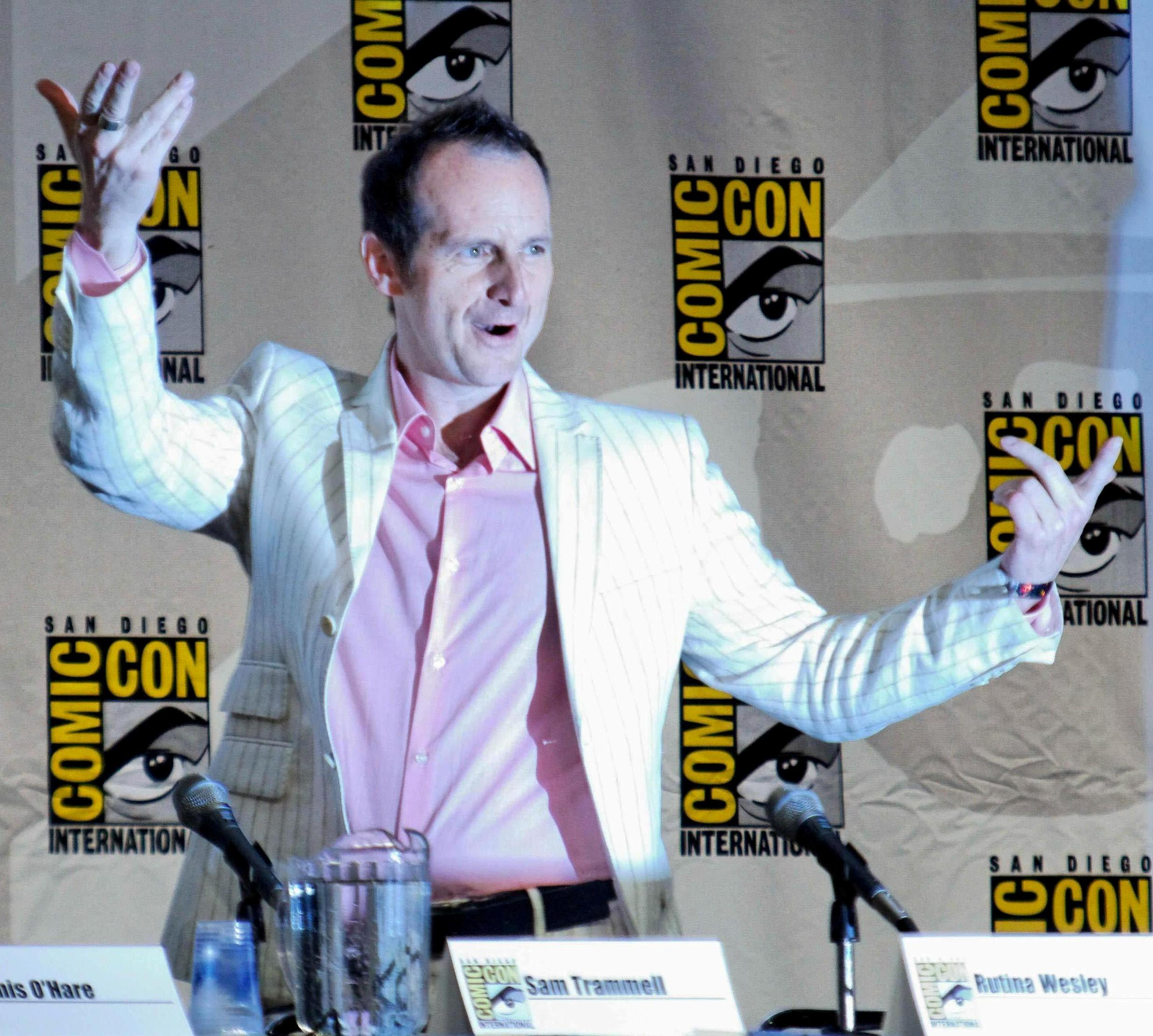
O'Hare promoting True Blood at the 2010 San Diego Comic-Con

Year	Title	Role	Venue	Ref.
1992	Hauptmannn	Richard Hauptmann		
1995	Racing Demon	Ewan Gilmour	Vivian Beaumont Theatre, Broadway	
1998–1999	Cabaret	Ernst Ludwig	Henry Miller's Theatre, Broadway	
2001	Major Barbara	Adolphus Cusins	American Airlines Theatre, Broadway	
2003–2004	Take Me Out	Mason Marzac	Walter Kerr Theatre, Broadway	
2004	Assassins	Charles Guiteau	Studio 54, Broadway	
2005	Sweet Charity	Oscar Lindquist	Al Hirschfeld Theatre, Broadway	
2007	Inherit the Wind	E. K. Hornbeck	Lyceum Theatre, Broadway	
2010	Elling	Elling	Ethel Barrymore Theatre, Broadway	
2012	Into the Woods	The Baker	Delacorte Theatre, Shakespeare in the Park	
2012	Assassins	Charles Guiteau	Roundabout Theatre Company concert	
2023–2024	Here We Are	Man	The Shed, Off-Broadway	
2025	Here We Are	Man	National Theatre, London	

== See also ==
- List of awards and nominations received by Denis O'Hare
