= Selda and Derek =

American songwriters

- Origin: United States
- Genres: Country, pop, musical theatre
- Members: Selda Sahin; Derek Gregor
- Website: seldaandderek.com

Selda and Derek are an NYC-based songwriting duo, consisting of Selda Sahin and Derek Gregor with projects in theatre, film, television, pop and country music.

== History ==
Selda Sahin and Derek Gregor met at New York University. While pursuing songwriting separately, they became roommates. When a mutual friend asked them to write an original wedding song, it unexpectedly became their first collaboration. Since that song in 2010, they've gone on to collaborate on projects in theatre, film, television, pop and country music.

As a result of Derek's previous and ongoing collaboration with lyricist Sam Carner (branded Carner and Gregor), "Selda and Derek" chose to use their first names to label their partnership. Subsequently, they've found that name to exemplify their often intimate, folky style of writing.

=== Works ===
- American Reject - Selda and Derek wrote the original songs for the feature film American Reject (Keala Settle, Billy Ray Cyrus, Annaleigh Ashford, Rebecca Black, Juvenile, Angelica Hale, Kathleen Monteleone) which follows Kay Montgomery, a top finalist who gets kicked off America's hottest singing competition, and is forced to move back in with her mother as reality cameras follow her every move.
- Grind - Selda and Derek wrote the original songs for the award-winning musical short film Grind (Anthony Rapp, Claire Coffee and Pasha Pellosie) about a serial killer on a dating app. Grind gained an underground cult status and won several awards in the film festival circuit. Script by Zachary Halley, produced by Telly Leung (and others).
- Modern - Selda and Derek wrote the book, music and lyrics to Modern, a musical about a group of teenagers on their Rumspringa. Previous development includes ASCAP Stephen Schwartz and Grow-A-Show workshops, the Village Theatre Festival of New Musicals, USC's "Live Read" and Bloomington Playwrights Project.
- Particle - Selda and Derek wrote the music and lyrics, and co-wrote the book with Autumn Reeser, to the musical Particle. It follows a teenage girl gamer who gets unexpectedly recruited onto a professional Esports gaming team. Currently in development, Particle received a reading at Michigan State University through their Imagen program.
- Class Election - Selda and Derek wrote the music and lyrics, and co-wrote the book with Colton Pometta, to the TYA musical Class Election. A take on Cyrano De Bergerac, Class Election follows Cy, an 8th grade girl obsessed with politics, who wants to be student council president. Her fear of public speaking and lack of confidence stand in her way, and when she teams up with Chris (a popular classmate), he agrees to run for president using her ideas. Class Election toured the east coast in the summer of 2016 and is currently available for licensing through Stage Rights.
- Off Season - Selda and Derek wrote the book, music and lyrics to the musical Off Season. A year after Colin (a 20-something fisherman) drowns, his father and his best friend run into each other unexpectedly at Colin's favorite bar. In the process of coming to terms with Colin's death in their own ways, neither is happy the other one is there. Set in a New England summer town during the off season, the show is in development.
- Songs to Say I Do - In 2020, with projects on hold due to the COVID-19 pandemic, Selda and Derek, having previously written several custom wedding songs for friends, formalized that endeavor into a business. They write bespoke wedding and anniversary songs for clients around the world.

=== Workshops and teaching ===
Together and separately, Selda Sahin and Derek Gregor have led workshops, master classes and courses at New York University, University of Michigan, Yale, University of Southern California, Princeton, University of California Irvine, Royal Academy of Dramatic Art, Elon University, San Diego State University, Indiana University, Baylor University, Circle in the Square, among others.

=== Accolades ===
Selda and Derek have won and been nominated for numerous awards, both separately and as a duo.

Year	Ceremony	Category	Recipient(s)	Result
2004	American Academy of Arts and Letters	Richard Rodgers Award	Unlock'd — Derek Gregor (w/ Sam Carner)	Won
2005	Primetime Emmy Award	Outstanding Special Class Program	Passion — Selda Sahin	Won
2014	NYC Downtown Shorts Film Festival	Best LGBT Film	Grind	Won
2014	FilmOut San Diego	Best Overall Short Film	Grind	Won
2014	FilmOut San Diego	Outstanding Artistic Achievement	Grind	Won
2014	Honolulu Rainbow Film Festival	Best Short Film	Grind	Won
2014	SENE Music and Film Festival	Best LGBT Film	Grind	Won
2014	MAC Awards	John Wallowitch Award	Carner and Gregor	Won
2015	Great American Song Contest	Best Song	"The Storm"	Nominated
2016	MAC Awards	Special Material	"The Egg Nog Song" — Derek Gregor (w/ Sam Carner)	Won
2018	Nashville Songwriters Association International	Member Award	Selda Sahin	Won
2020	The Adirondack Film Festival	"Best of Fest" Honor	American Reject	Won
2020	The BendFilm Festival 2020	Audience Award for Best Narrative Feature	American Reject	Won
2020	Cyrus International Festival of Toronto 2020	Best International Feature	American Reject	Won
2020	Las Vegas International Film & Screenwriting Festival 2020	Best Musical Feature	American Reject	Won
