= Ronn Carroll =

American actor

- Born: 1935 or 1936 (age 90–91); Petersburg, Virginia, U.S.
- Occupation: Actor
- Years active: 1966–present
- Spouse: Anne Calhoun

Ronn Carroll is an American actor known primarily for his work on Broadway, with over twenty credits to his name.

Career highlights include Oklahoma!, directed by Trevor Nunn, How to Succeed in Business Without Really Trying with Matthew Broderick, and two productions of Annie Get Your Gun with both Ethel Merman and Bernadette Peters. He appeared with Tyne Daly in the 1990 revival of Gypsy.

Other Broadway credits include the original casts of On Golden Pond, Crazy for You and Steel Pier. His appearances at Lincoln Center include A Man of No Importance with Roger Rees, Room Service with John Lithgow and Richard Thomas, Woody Allen's The Floating Light Bulb, and Carousel with John Raitt.

== Theatre credits ==
Year	Title	Role	Notes	Ref.
1966	Annie Get Your Gun	Foster Wilson / Mr. Schuyler Adams; u/s Chief Sitting Bull; u/s Charlie Davenport	Broadway	
1968	Promises, Promises	Mr. Kirkeby; u/s Mr. Eichelberger	Broadway	
1972	Man of La Mancha	The Padre	Broadway	
1979	On Golden Pond	Charlie Martin	Broadway	
1979	Peter Pan	Mr. Smee / Captain Hook / Mr. Darling	Broadway	
1982	Play Me a Country Song	Howard	Broadway	
1982	Greater Tuna	Performer	Off-Broadway	
1984	The Rink	Ben / Dino's Father / Mrs. Silverman / Sister Philomena	Broadway	
1985	The Mystery of Edwin Drood	Bazzard / Mr. Phillip Bax; Durdles / Mr. Nick Cricker	Broadway	
1986	The Front Page	Kruger	Broadway	
1987	The Knife	G.P. / Michael	Off-Broadway	
1989	Love's Labour's Lost	Nathaniel	Off-Broadway	
1989	Gypsy	Cigar / Pop	Broadway	
1992	Crazy for You	Everett Baker	Broadway	
1994	The Best Little Whorehouse Goes Public	Senator A. Harry Hardast	Broadway	
1995	How to Succeed in Business Without Really Trying	J.B. Biggley	Broadway	
1997	Steel Pier	Mr. Walker	Broadway	
1999	Annie Get Your Gun	Foster Wilson / Pawnee Bill	Broadway	
2002	Oklahoma!	Ike Skidmore	Broadway	
2002	A Man of No Importance	Baldy O'Shea	Off-Broadway	
2005	A Wonderful Life	Tom Bailey	Broadway	

== Filmography ==
- 1980 Friday the 13th as Sergeant Tierney
- 1981 Friday the 13th Part 2 as Sergeant Tierney (uncredited, archived footage)
- 1983 Spring Break as Officier
- 1986 House as Officier
- 1987 84 Charing Cross Road as Businessman On Plane
- 1987 House II: The Second Story as Deputy
- 1989 DeepStar Six as Osborne
- 1995 The Real Shlemiel as Uncle Shlemiel (voice)
- 1997 Fool's Paradise as Mr. Foxworth
- 1998 The Wedding as Dr. Havermeyer
- 2005 The Producers as Stormtrooper Mel
- 2013 Crystal Lake Memories: The Complete History of Friday the 13th as Himself (Documentary film)
