= A.J. Shively =

American stage actor and singer

- Born: May 15, 1986 (age 40); Dublin, Ohio, U.S.
- Education: University of Michigan (BFA)
- Occupation: Actor
- Years active: 1999–present

A.J. Shively is an American actor and singer. He made his Broadway debut as Jean-Michel in the 2010 revival of La Cage aux Folles at the Longacre Theatre. He subsequently originated the roles of Billy Cane in Bright Star at the Cort Theatre (2017) and Owen Duignan in Paradise Square at the Ethel Barrymore Theatre (2022).

Shively is the recipient of a Theatre World Award and a Lucille Lortel Award. He has received nominations for two Drama Desk Awards, two Outer Critics Circle Awards, and the Tony Award for Best Featured Actor in a Musical.

== Early life and education ==
Shively was born on May 15, 1986, in Dublin, Ohio. He made his professional stage debut at age thirteen in the 1999 National Tour of Rodgers and Hammerstein's The Sound of Music.

He earned a Bachelor of Fine Arts in Musical Theatre from the University of Michigan's School of Music, Theatre, and Dance in 2008. During undergrad, he spent a year training at the Royal Academy of Dramatic Art.

== Career ==
Shively made his Broadway debut as Jean-Michel in the 2010 revival of Jerry Herman and Harvey Fierstein's La Cage aux Folles at the Longacre Theatre. The production won the 2010 Tony Award for Best Revival of a Musical. That same year he appeared in a benefit concert production of Lerner and Loewe's Brigadoon at the Shubert Theatre. In 2016, Shively originated the role of Billy Cane in Steve Martin and Edie Brickell's Bright Star at the Cort Theatre. His performance earned a nomination for the Drama Desk Award for Outstanding Featured Actor in a Musical. In 2022, Shively originated the role of Owen Duignan in Paradise Square at the Ethel Barrymore Theatre. His performance earned nominations for the Tony Award for Best Featured Actor in a Musical, the Outer Critics Circle Award for Outstanding Featured Actor in a Musical, and the Chita Rivera Award for Outstanding Male Dancer in a Broadway Show.

Off-Broadway, Shively has appeared in Gabriel Kahane and Seth Bockley's February House at The Public Theater (2012), Carner and Gregor's Unlock'd at Prospect Theatre Company (2013), and Teresa Deevy's The Suitcase Under the Bed at Mint Theater Company. The latter production was named a "Critic's Pick" by The New York Times. In 2022, Shively appeared as Robbie Fay in the Classic Stage Company revival of A Man of No Importance by Stephen Flaherty and Lynn Ahrens, based on the Albert Finney film of the same name. For his performance, Shively won the Lucille Lortel Award for Outstanding Featured Performer in a Musical, and received an Outer Critics Circle Award nomination. In 2024, Shively starred as Gar O'Donnell in Brian Friel's Philadelphia, Here I Come! at the Irish Repertory Theatre. His performance earned him the Theatre World Award's Dorothy Loudon Award, as well as nominations for the Lucille Lortel Award and Drama Desk Award for Outstanding Lead Performance in a Play.

In film, Shively has appeared in Syrup (2013), From Nowhere (2016), and Other People's Bodies (2025). On television, he's had guest and recurring roles on Homeland (2017), The Blacklist (2017-2019), Madam Secretary (2018), Hunters (2020), Bull (2021), Julia (2022), and Chicago Med (2025).

== Credits ==
=== Film ===
Year	Title	Role	Notes	Ref.
2013	Syrup	Kevin		
2013	Hair Brained	Harvard two		
2016	From Nowhere	Chris		
2025	Other People's Bodies	Seb		

=== Television ===
Year	Title	Role	Notes	Ref.
2017	Homeland	Ronald	Episode: "America First"	
2017	Younger	Waiter	Episode: "The Gelato and the Pube"	
2017-2019	The Blacklist	Randolf	2 episodes	
2018	Madam Secretary	Quentin	Episode: "Protocol"	
2020	Hunters	Jakob Schneider	Episode: "The Pious Thieves"	
2021	Bull	Jerry McConnell	Episode: "Espionage"	
2022	Julia	Chef Andre	Episode: "Foie Gras"	
2025	Chicago Med	Corey Graham	Episode: "Horseshoes and Hand Grenades"	

=== Theatre (selected) ===
Year	Title	Role	Playwright	Venue	Ref.
1999-2000	The Sound of Music	Kurt von Trapp (u/s)	Rodgers and Hammerstein	National Tour	
2010-2011	La Cage aux Folles	Jean-Michel	Jerry Herman & Harvey Fierstein	Longacre Theatre, Broadway	
2012	February House	Chester Kallman	Gabriel Kahane & Seth Bockley	The Public Theater	
2013	Unlock'd	Edwin	Carner and Gregor	Prospect Theatre Company	
2014	Bright Star	Billy Cane	Steve Martin & Edie Brickell	The Old Globe	
2015-2016	Bright Star	Billy Cane	Steve Martin & Edie Brickell	The Kennedy Center	
2016	Bright Star	Billy Cane	Steve Martin & Edie Brickell	Cort Theatre, Broadway	
2017	The Suitcase Under the Bed	Mr. Bassett / Barney / Charlie Moore / Jim Harris	Teresa Deevy	Mint Theater Company	
2017-2018	Bright Star	Billy Cane	Steve Martin & Edie Brickell	National Tour	
2018-2019	Paradise Square	Owen Duignan	Larry Kirwan, Jason Howland, Masi Asare, Nathan Tysen, Christina Anderson, & Craig Lucas	Berkeley Repertory Theatre	
2021	Paradise Square	Owen Duignan	Larry Kirwan, Jason Howland, Masi Asare, Nathan Tysen, Christina Anderson, & Craig Lucas	Nederlander Theatre (Chicago)	
2022	Paradise Square	Owen Duignan	Larry Kirwan, Jason Howland, Masi Asare, Nathan Tysen, Christina Anderson, & Craig Lucas	Ethel Barrymore Theatre, Broadway	
2022	A Man of No Importance	Robbie Fay	Stephen Flaherty & Lynn Ahrens	Classic Stage Company	
2024	Philadelphia, Here I Come!	Gar O'Donnell	Brian Friel	Irish Repertory Theatre	
2024	Titanic	Charles Clarke	Maury Yeston & Peter Stone	New York City Center Encores!	

== Awards and nominations ==
Year	Award	Category	Work	Result	Ref.
2016	Drama Desk Award	Outstanding Featured Actor in a Musical	Bright Star	Nominated	
2022	Outer Critics Circle Award	Outstanding Featured Actor in a Musical	Paradise Square	Nominated	
2022	Tony Award	Best Featured Actor in a Musical	Paradise Square	Nominated	
2022	Chita Rivera Award	Outstanding Male Dancer in a Broadway Show	Paradise Square	Nominated	
2023	Lucille Lortel Award	Outstanding Featured Performer in a Musical	A Man of No Importance	Won	
2023	Outer Critics Circle Award	Outstanding Featured Performer in an Off-Broadway Musical	A Man of No Importance	Nominated	
2024	Drama Desk Award	Outstanding Lead Performance in a Play	Philadelphia, Here I Come!	Nominated	
2024	Theatre World Award	Dorothy Loudon Award for Excellence in the Theater	Philadelphia, Here I Come!	Won	
2024	Lucille Lortel Award	Outstanding Lead Performer in a Play	Philadelphia, Here I Come!	Nominated	
