= A Man of No Importance (musical) =

- 2002 Off-Broadway Cast Recording
- Music: Stephen Flaherty
- Lyrics: Lynn Ahrens
- Book: Terrence McNally
- Basis: 1994 film A Man of No Importance
- Productions: 2002 Lincoln Center; 2008 Toronto; 2009 Off-West End; 2010 West End; 2013 Salisbury; 2022 Off-Broadway
- Awards: Outer Critics for Best Off-Broadway Musical

A Man of No Importance is a musical with music by Stephen Flaherty, lyrics by Lynn Ahrens and a book by Terrence McNally, based on the 1994 Albert Finney film, A Man of No Importance. It tells the story of an amateur theatre group in Dublin and their leader, who is determined to stage a version of Salome at his church, despite the objections of church authorities.

== Production history ==
The musical ran from September 12, 2002, to December 29, 2002, in the Mitzi E. Newhouse Theater at Lincoln Center in New York City, as part of the Lincoln Center Theater 2002–03 season. The production was directed by Joe Mantello and choreographed by Jonathan Butterell. It won the 2003 Outer Critics Circle Award for Best Off-Broadway Musical. The original cast included Roger Rees as Alfie Byrne, Jarlath Conroy as Father Kenny, Jessica Molaskey as Mrs. Patrick, Sean McCourt as Sully O'Hara, Luther Creek as Peter/Breton Beret, Faith Prince as Lily Byrne, Sally Murphy as Adele, Ronn Carroll as Baldy, Charles Keating as Carney/Oscar Wilde, and Steven Pasquale as Robbie Fay. A cast album was recorded in 2002 and released in April 2003.

The musical was produced by Acting Up Stage Theatre Company at the Berkeley Street Theatre in Toronto, Ontario, Canada and ran from March 7 to 22, 2008. Alfie was played by Douglas E. Hughes, and Lezlie Wade directed the production.

Regan and De Wynter produced the musical at The Union Theatre, Southwark, where it ran from November 11, 2009, to December 5, 2009. It starred Paul Clarkson as Alfie and Paul Monaghan as Carney/Oscar Wilde. The production received unanimously positive reviews. The show transferred to the Arts Theatre in the West End for a limited season, opening on February 10, 2010, following a single preview on February 9, 2010, and running until 27 February 2010.

In April 2013, A production of the show was played at the Salisbury Playhouse for three months, with cast members including Mark Meadows, Fra Fee and Laura Pitt-Pulford.

The Classic Stage Company produced the first New York City revival of the musical in October 2022 - directed by John Doyle in his last show as artistic director of the CSC, and starring Jim Parsons as Alfie Byrne.

== Synopsis ==
Act 1

In 1964 in Dublin, Ireland, Alfie Byrne is the director of an amateur theatre troupe that has been shut down by the Sodality of the Sacred Heart. The group, The St. Imelda's Players, is based at the church. Alfie, a bus conductor, wants to stage a production of Oscar Wilde's Salome at his church, despite the objections of church authorities.

As he reflects on events, the actors in the troupe become, in effect, a Greek chorus and take him through a typical day of "A Man of No Importance", in the form of a play in which he is not the director but the star. As the "play" unfolds, the people in Alfie's life appear: his sister Lily, a handsome bus driver Robbie Fay, and newcomer Adele Rice. Alfie "performs" by speaking Wilde's words to Adele, impressing the bus passengers (who are members of the acting group). As Alfie prepares dinner for himself and Lily, he tells her that he has met a woman. Lily has delayed marriage with her boyfriend Mr. Carney to take care of Alfie until he marries, and is happy for him ("Burden of Life"). Alfie explains that he is not interested in marriage to Adele – he wants her to act in 'Salome'. Frustrated, Lily castigates Alfie for wasting his time in amateur theatre. The next day, Alfie goes around to Mr. Carney and the other troupe members to offer them parts in "Salome". Everyone is extremely excited about a new show starting, and each member shows their acting resume as they sing about their excitement ("Going Up!"). The next day, Alfie delays the bus from leaving just to allow Adele to catch the bus, which she was late for due to an appointment with the doctor. He attempts to convince her to be Princess Salome, the titular character of "Salome", by reading some verses of the play to her. Adele believes that Alfie is making fun of her like many in her old town and storms out of the bus. Confused, Alfie follows her out of the bus. Despite her fears that she, a regular common girl from Roscommon, would never be able to portray a princess, Adele is touched by his words and agrees to be in the play ("Princess").

After the first reading, Alfie attempts to talk Robbie into being "Salome"'s main romantic lead of John the Baptist. Robbie dismisses Alfie's attempts to get him involved, and conversely invites him to take a step into his own world, convincing Alfie to explore the streets of Dublin and to go to a pub with his pals ("Streets of Dublin"). At the pub, Alfie goes through several traditions for newcomers, including ordering a pint and singing a song in front of Robbie's pals ("Love's Never Lost"). Robbie's pals are not impressed, leading to Alfie to wander off where he is propositioned by Breton Beret. Alfie is flustered by Breton and returns home, troubled about his true identity. Meanwhile, Mr. Carney is with Lily at her and Alfie's home, condemning "Salome" as horrid pornography. Shortly after, Mr. Carney and Lily share some private drinks as they discuss Alfie's 'odd' habit of reading books and cooking foreign dishes; Mr. Carney attempts to woo Lily all the while, but Lily refuses to marry "till [Alfie's] wed" ("Books"). Alfie interrupts them as he returns home, and storms up to his room. As he gazes at himself in the mirror, he sees Oscar Wilde in a dream, and admits that he loves Robbie ("Man in the Mirror"). After a rehearsal of 'Salome', Lily invites Adele for Sunday dinner, saying that Alfie is hesitant to speak for himself ("Burden of Life" – Reprise). As Alfie is walking her home, Adele tells him that in her home town she has a boyfriend, John, and starts crying when she can't explain why he isn't here with her. Understanding about secrets, Alfie advises her that everything's alright ("Love Who You Love").

Alfie bumps into Breton Beret again after he's escorted Adele home, and he propositions Alfie again before going on his way. Alfie is trapped between his own shame and desire, but Oscar Wilde again advises him that the way to eliminate temptation is by giving in.

Act 2

As Mrs. Patrick sings a hymn ("Our Father"), Alfie is confessing to Father Kenny, as he tells about his minor sins. Alfie hears Robbie in a disembodied voice, but he cannot confess to his feelings ("Confession"). After church, Alfie leaves Lily and Mr. Carney to pay respects at their father's grave; there he meets Baldy, who brings a bouquet of white lilies to lay at his wife Mary's grave, reminiscing about the "Cuddles that Mary Gave" before encouraging Alfie to find a wife of his own. One and a half weeks before the opening night, the troupe is rehearsing and going through some interesting ideas on how to address the problems of props, costumes, lighting, promotion, and choreography ("Art"). Struggling through the lines of the final scene where Princess Salome professes her love to the severed head of John the Baptist, Adele suddenly cries and tells Alfie that she is pregnant, then leaves after Alfie awkwardly confirms that she is unmarried. Alfie is called to an emergency Sodality meeting organized by Mr. Carney, where the play 'Salome' is deemed blasphemous ("A Man of No Importance (Reprise)/Confusing Times"); Monsignor cancels it and orders that the St. Imelda's Players be ended.

Alfie, feeling sad, goes to the bus station where he catches Robbie engaging in extramarital affairs with Mrs. Patrick. Shocked, Alfie questions Robbie's professed love to Mrs. Patrick, as she is married with 3 children. Robbie is furious at Alfie's judgments and berates Alfie for judging him when Alfie has lived a loveless life, before leaving Alfie alone ("Love who you Love (Robbie's Reprise)"). Going home to his room, Alfie is visited by a multitude of visions of the townfolk, Robbie, and Oscar Wilde, who tell him how to dress and how to express his hidden self ("Man in the Mirror"). Convinced that "the only way to get rid of temptation is to yield to it" and newly dressed in clothes that indicate his sexuality, Alfie goes to the pub and propositions Breton Beret. Breton takes Alfie's hand, caresses him, but suddenly punches Alfie in the next moment. Breton calls others over to beat him as well. As they beat him, Alfie cries out in pain for Robbie and Breton reveals that they regularly use this method to hunt for "poofters". He and the others only stop beating him and run away when a policeman comes over to investigate. Lily and Carney find Alfie with the policeman and take Alfie home, but not before the policeman reveals that Alfie won't press charges for assault because it would reveal that Alfie is gay.

The next morning, Lily and Alfie are having breakfast when they erupt into an argument after Lily refuses to eat what may be "tainted" food, with Alfie venomously explaining that he's never had any opportunity to be tainted by homosexual relations. Lily responds with both fury and despair, bemoaning the wasted years looking after her brother and asking why he never told her the truth. He leaves in the middle of her argument, leaving her alone as she ends with "you must have known I'd love you all the same" ("Tell me Why"). The news spreads that Alfie is gay and he finds that many people now treat him with contempt and disgust, including his abusive supervisor and new bus driver who they claim was to take the spot of Robbie who "fled as far as he could when he heard the news". Adele comes to see Alfie one last time before she goes to England to have her baby, showing true empathy for his situation and encouraging him as Alfie once encouraged her ("Love who you Love (Adele's Reprise)"). Finally, Alfie is alone at St. Imelda's hall and thinks back on his life, coming to know that he can no longer hide ("Welcome to the World"). A ray of sunlight enters the dimly lit room as Robbie walks in, and he explains that he's here to play the part of John the Baptist and that he was forcefully placed in another station by the supervisor. He is followed by most of the members of St. Imelda's Players (other than Mr. Carney), who reveal that they don't care about his sexuality as they know that Alfie is a good and kind man. Lily enters as well, bringing refreshments stolen from Mr. Carney. Now a member of the new acting troupe, Robbie reads a passage from Oscar Wilde's "The Ballad of Reading Gaol" ("Poem").

== Musical numbers ==
Act I

- "A Man of No Importance" – Alfie, Company
- "The Burden of Life" – Lily
- "Going Up" – Carney, The St. Imelda's Players
- "Princess" – Adele
- "First Rehearsal" – Alfie, The St. Imelda's Players
- "The Streets of Dublin" – Robbie, Company
- "Books" – Carney, Lily
- "Man in the Mirror" – Alfie, Oscar Wilde
- "Love Who You Love" – Alfie

Act II

- "Our Father" – Mrs. Patrick, Company
- "Confession" – Alfie, Robbie, Father Kenny
- "The Cuddles Mary Gave" – Baldy
- "Art" – Alfie, St. Imelda's Players
- "A Man of No Importance (Reprise)" – Mrs. Patrick, Breton Beret, Sully
- "Confusing Times" – Carney
- "Love Who You Love (Reprise)" – Robbie
- "Man in the Mirror (Reprise)" – Oscar Wilde, Company
- "Tell Me Why" – Lily
- "A Man of No Importance" (Reprise)" – Company
- "Love Who You Love (Reprise)" – Adele
- "Welcome to the World" – Alfie
- "Poem" – Alfie

== Production casts ==
Character	2002 Lincoln Center	2009 Southwark	2010 West End	2013 Salisbury Playhouse	2022 Classic Stage Company
Alfie Byrne	Roger Rees	Paul Clarkson	Paul Clarkson	Mark Meadows	Jim Parsons
Lily Byrne	Faith Prince	Joanna Nevin	Joanna Nevin	Angela Bain	Mare Winningham
Robbie Fay	Steven Pasquale	Patrick Kelliher	Patrick Kelliher	Fra Fee	A.J. Shively
Adele Rice	Sally Murphy	Róisín Sullivan	Róisín Sullivan	Laura Pitt-Pulford	Shereen Ahmed
William Carney/Oscar Wilde	Charles Keating	Paul Monaghan	Paul Monaghan	Robert Maskill	Thom Sesma
James Michael "Baldy" O'Shea	Ronn Carroll	Anthony Cable	Anthony Cable	Roy Weskin	William Youmans
Peter/Breton Baret	Luther Creek	Dieter Thomas	Niall Sheehy	Alistair David	Da’Von T. Moody
Mrs. Margaret Grace/Kitty Farrelly	Katherine McGrath	Emily Juler	Emily Juler	Mia Soteriou	Mary Beth Peil
Mrs. Maureen Curtin	Patti Perkins	Kimberley Ensor	Kimberley Ensor	Esther Biddle	Kara Mikula
Miss Oona Crowe	Barbara Marineau	Ruth Berkeley	Ruth Berkeley	Susannah ven den Berg	Alma Cuervo
Ernie Lally	Martin Moran	Jamie Honeybourne	Jamie Honeybourne	Richard Emerson	Joel Waggoner
Mrs. Patrick	Jessica Molaskey	Nicola Redman	Nicola Redman	Esther Biddle	Jessica Tyler Wright
Father Kenny	Jarlath Conroy	AJ O'Neill	AJ O'Neill	Darragh Carter	Nathaniel Stampley
Carson/Rasher Flynn	Michael McCormick	Niall Sheehy	Daniel Maguire	Chris Talman	

== Awards and nominations ==
=== 2002 Off-Broadway production ===
Year	Award	Category	Nominee	Result	Ref.
2003	Drama Desk Awards	Outstanding Musical		Nominated	
2003	Drama Desk Awards	Outstanding Featured Actor in a Musical	Charles Keating	Nominated	
2003	Drama Desk Awards	Outstanding Featured Actor in a Musical	Steven Pasquale	Nominated	
2003	Drama Desk Awards	Outstanding Director of a Musical	Joe Mantello	Nominated	
2003	Drama Desk Awards	Outstanding Music	Stephen Flaherty	Nominated	
2003	Drama Desk Awards	Outstanding Lyrics	Lynn Ahrens	Nominated	
2003	Drama Desk Awards	Outstanding Book of a Musical	Terrence McNally	Nominated	
2003	Outer Critics Circle Awards	Outstanding New Off-Broadway Musical		Won	
2003	Outer Critics Circle Awards	Outstanding Actor in a Musical	Roger Rees	Nominated	
2003	Outer Critics Circle Awards	Outstanding Featured Actor in a Musical	Steven Pasquale	Nominated	

=== 2022 Off-Broadway Revival ===
Year	Award	Category	Nominee	Result
2023	Lucille Lortel Awards	Outstanding Revival		Nominated
2023	Lucille Lortel Awards	Outstanding Lead Performer in a Musical	Jim Parsons	Nominated
2023	Lucille Lortel Awards	Outstanding Featured Performer in a Musical	A.J. Shively	Won
2023	Drama League Awards	Outstanding Revival of a Musical		Nominated
2023	Outer Critics Circle Awards	Outstanding Revival of a Musical		Nominated
2023	Outer Critics Circle Awards	Outstanding Featured Performer in an Off-Broadway Musical	A.J. Shively	Nominated
2023	Outer Critics Circle Awards	Outstanding Featured Performer in an Off-Broadway Musical	Mare Winningham	Nominated
2023	Drama Desk Awards	Outstanding Revival of a Musical		Nominated
2023	Drama Desk Awards	Featured Performance in a Musical	Mare Winningham	Nominated
2023	Drama Desk Awards	Outstanding Director of a Musical	John Doyle	Nominated
2023	Drama Desk Awards	Outstanding Orchestrations	Bruce Coughlin	Nominated
