= List of awards and nominations received by Denis O'Hare =

Denis O'Hare awards and nominations
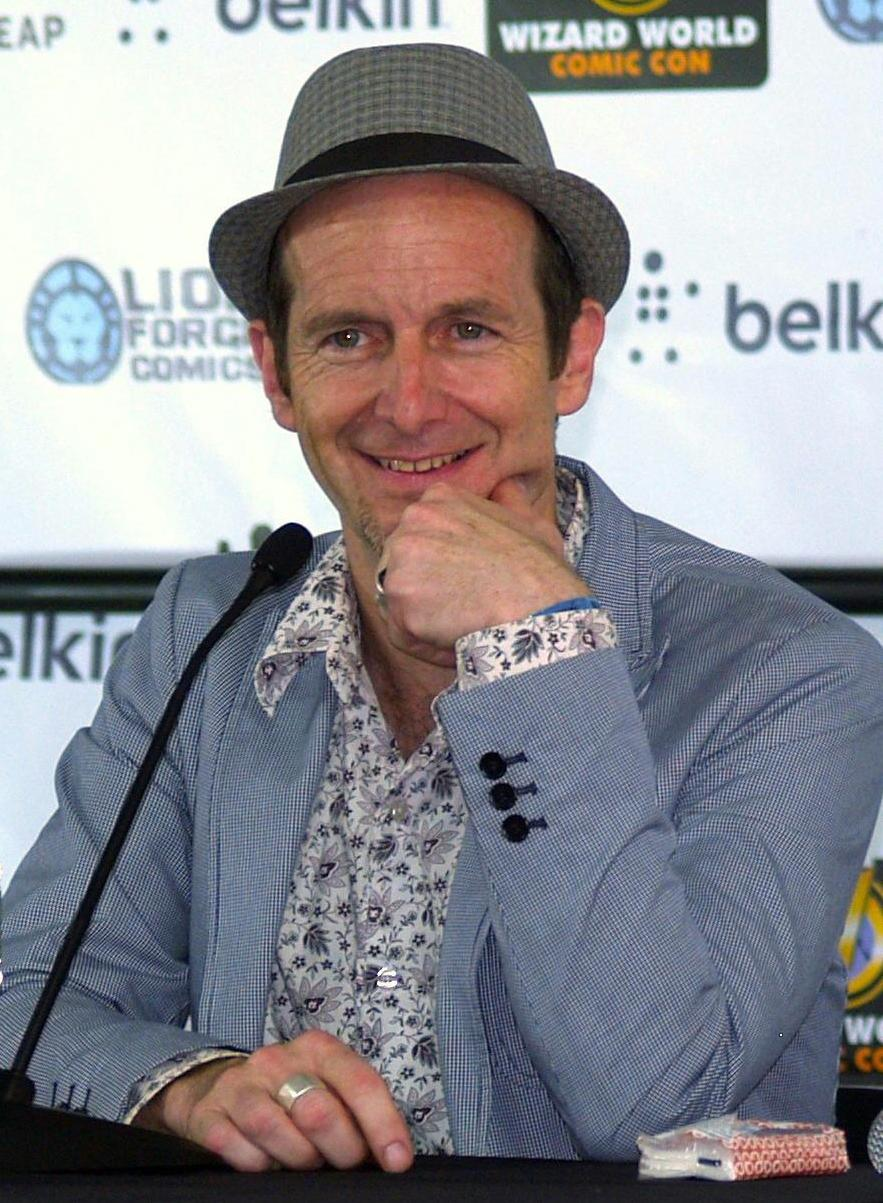
- O'Hare attending the Wizard World New York Experience in Manhattan in 2013
Totals
Award	Wins	Nominations
Broadway.com Awards	1	3
Clarence Derwent Awards	1	1
Critics' Choice Movie Award	1	1
Drama Desk Awards	2	4
Drama League Awards	0	4
Lucille Lortel Awards	2	2
Obie Awards	1	1
OFTA Awards	1	1
Outer Critics Circle Awards	2	3
PAAFTJ Awards	0	1
PFCS Awards	1	1
Primetime Emmy Awards	0	3
Screen Actors Guild Awards	0	2
Tony Awards	1	2
Wins	13
Nominations	28

Denis O'Hare is an American actor, singer, and author. The following is a list of awards and nominations he has received.

== Film and television awards ==
=== Critics' Choice Movie Awards ===
Year	Nominated work	Category	Result
2008	Milk	Best Acting Ensemble	Won^{[A]}

=== Online Film & Television Association Awards ===
Year	Nominated work	Category	Result
2008	Milk	Best Ensemble	Won^{[B]}

=== Pan-American Association of Film & Television Journalists Awards ===
Year	Nominated work	Category	Result
2012	American Horror Story	Best Cast in a Miniseries or Television Movie	Nominated^{[C]}

=== Phoenix Film Critics Society Awards ===
Year	Nominated work	Category	Result
2008	Milk	Best Acting Ensemble	Won^{[D]}

=== Primetime Emmy Awards ===
Year	Nominated work	Category	Result
2012	American Horror Story: Murder House	Outstanding Supporting Actor in a Limited Series or Movie	Nominated
2015	American Horror Story: Freak Show	Outstanding Supporting Actor in a Limited Series or Movie	Nominated
2017	This Is Us	Outstanding Guest Actor in a Drama Series	Nominated

=== Screen Actors Guild Awards ===
Year	Nominated work	Category	Result
2008	Milk	Outstanding Performance by a Cast in a Motion Picture	Nominated^{[D]}
2013	Dallas Buyers Club	Outstanding Performance by a Cast in a Motion Picture	Nominated^{[E]}
2020	Big Little Lies	Outstanding Performance by an Ensemble in a Drama Series	Nominated

== Theater awards ==
=== Broadway.com Audience Choice Awards ===
Year	Nominated work	Category	Result
2003	Take Me Out	Favorite Featured Actor in a Broadway Play	Won
2005	Sweet Charity	Favorite Featured Actor in a Musical	Nominated
2005	Sweet Charity	Favorite Onstage Pair	Nominated

=== Clarence Derwent Awards ===
Year	Nominated work	Category	Result
2003	Take Me Out	Most Promising Male Performer	Won

=== Drama Desk Awards ===
Year	Nominated work	Category	Result
1993	Hauptmann	Outstanding Actor in a Play	Nominated
2003	Take Me Out	Outstanding Featured Actor in a Play	Won
2005	Sweet Charity	Outstanding Featured Actor in a Musical	Won
2012	An Iliad	Outstanding Solo Performance	Nominated

=== Drama League Awards ===
Year	Nominated work	Category	Result
2003	Take Me Out	Distinguished Performance	Nominated
2004	Assassins	Distinguished Performance	Nominated
2006	Sweet Charity	Distinguished Performance	Nominated
2007	Inherit the Wind	Distinguished Performance	Nominated
2007	A Spanish Play	Distinguished Performance	Nominated

=== Lucille Lortel Awards ===
Year	Nominated work	Category	Result
2003	Take Me Out	Outstanding Featured Actor	Won
2012	An Iliad	Outstanding Solo Show	Won

=== Obie Awards ===
Year	Nominated work	Category	Result
2003	Take Me Out	Distinguished Performance by an Actor	Won

=== Outer Critics Circle Awards ===
Year	Nominated work	Category	Result
2003	Take Me Out	Outstanding Featured Actor in a Play	Won
2005	Sweet Charity	Outstanding Actor in a Musical	Nominated
2012	An Iliad	Outstanding Solo Performance	Won

=== Tony Awards ===
Year	Nominated work	Category	Result
2003	Take Me Out	Best Featured Actor in a Play	Won
2004	Assassins	Best Featured Actor in a Musical	Nominated

== Notes ==
- A Shared with Josh Brolin, James Franco, Victor Garber, Emile Hirsch, Sean Penn, Diego Luna, and Stephen Spinella
- B Shared with the cast
- C Connie Britton, Taissa Farmiga, Jessica Lange, Dylan McDermott, and Evan Peters
- D Shared with Josh Brolin, Joseph Cross, James Franco, Victor Garber, Emile Hirsch, Diego Luna, Sean Penn, and Alison Pill
- E Shared with Jennifer Garner, Jared Leto, Matthew McConaughey, Dallas Roberts, and Steve Zahn

== See also ==
- Denis O'Hare filmography
