= Shereen Ahmed =

American actress, singer

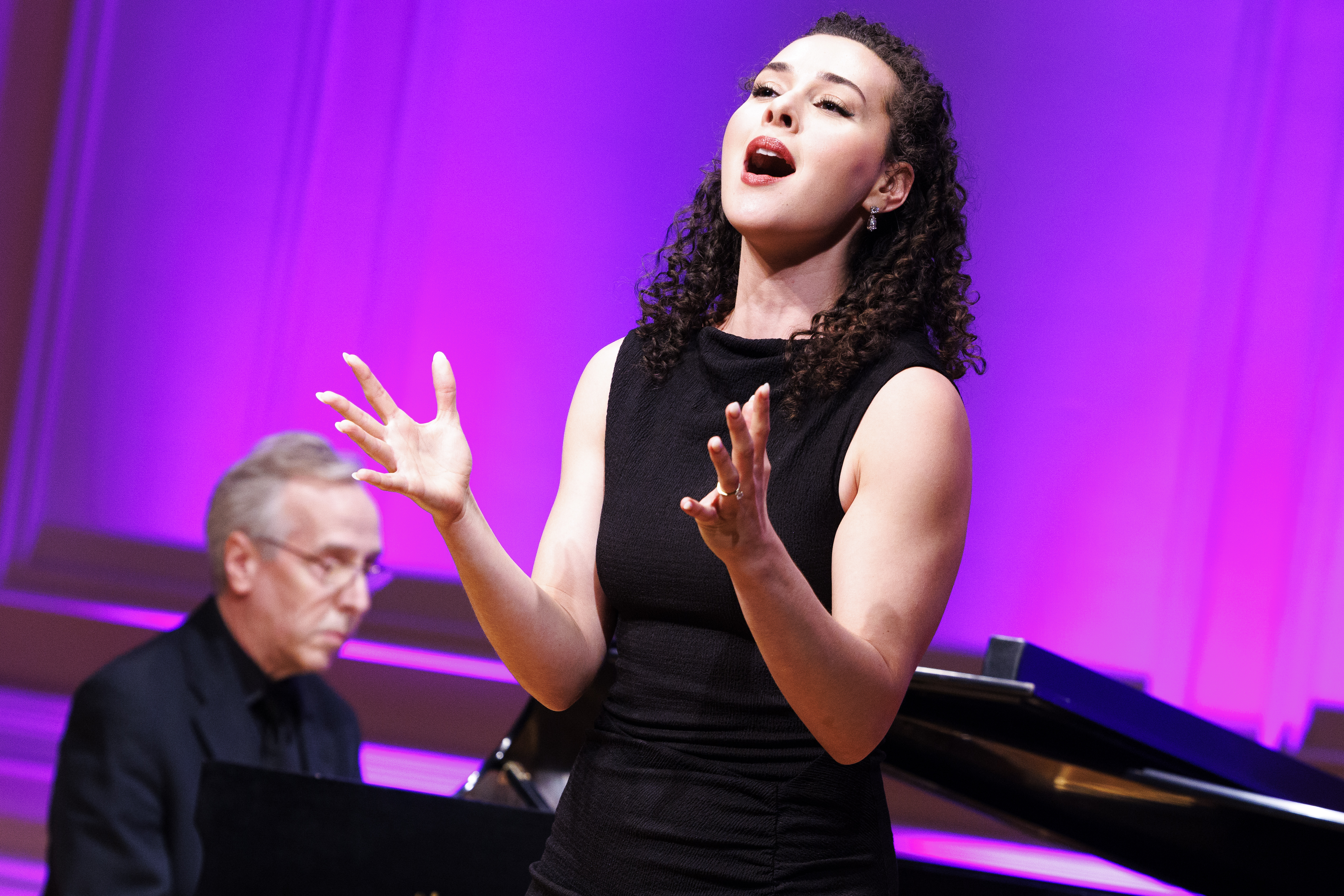
- Born: Maryland, U.S.
- Other names: Sherine Ahmed Tarek, Sherin Tarek, Shereen Ahmed Tarek
- Education: Towson University (BS)
- Occupations: Actress of stage and film, singer

Shereen Ahmed (also credited as Sherine Ahmed Tarek, Sherin Tarek, and Shereen Ahmed Tarek) is an American actress and singer, of Egyptian heritage. She is best known for her Broadway debut in the 2018 Lincoln Center Theater revival of My Fair Lady and for portraying Eliza Doolittle on the production's U.S. National Tour from 2019–2022.

Her stage credits also include Adele Rice in Classic Stage Company's Off-Broadway production of A Man of No Importance, Franca Naccarelli in New York City Center's The Light in the Piazza, and Claudia Nardi in Broadway Center Stage's Nine at the Kennedy Center.

== Early life and education ==
Ahmed grew up in Perry Hall, Maryland. She is the daughter of an Egyptian-born father from Alexandria and an American-born English teacher. She earned a Bachelor of Science degree in sociology and anthropology from Towson University in 2015.

== Career ==
Ahmed has maintained a career spanning Broadway, national touring productions, major regional theaters, and internationally broadcast performances. She understudied Laura Benanti as Eliza Doolittle in Lincoln Center Theater's revival of My Fair Lady and subsequently assumed the role full-time for the production's North American tour. According to published sources, she is the first performer of Egyptian descent to play the role in a major American staging of the musical. Her performance at the Dolby Theatre received recognition from the Los Angeles Drama Critics Circle.

Her Off-Broadway and regional credits include Franca Naccarelli in The Light in the Piazza at New York City Center Encores!, and Claudia Nardi in Nine at the Kennedy Center. Appearing alongside alongside actors Jim Parsons and Mare Winningham, she portrayed Adele Rice in John Doyle's production of A Man of No Importance at Classic Stage Company. Ahmed acted as Countess Ellen Olenska in the production of a new stage adaptation of The Age of Innocence at The Old Globe Theatre and later reprised the role at Arena Stage.

Ahmed has also appeared in concert and on television, including The Eyes of the World: From D-Day to VE Day, performed at the White House. A separate performance of the concert with the Boston Pops was televised on PBS. She has performed at Carnegie Hall on multiple occasions with the MasterVoices Chorus, performing in George and Ira Gershwin's Strike Up the Band and Gilbert and Sullivan's Iolanthe. Her television credits include Law & Order: SVU and New Amsterdam.

On November 1, 2025, Ahmed headlined the official opening ceremony of the Grand Egyptian Museum (GEM) in Cairo, a globally-broadcast event that brought together international dignitaries, world leaders, and performers. Ahmed delivered a featured musical performance, including the GEM's theme song "Around the World," composed by Hesham Nazih.

== Stage ==
Stage roles
Year	Title	Role	Venue	Source
2025	The Age of Innocence	Countess Ellen Olenska	Arena Stage	
2024	The Age of Innocence (World Premiere)	Countess Ellen Olenska	The Old Globe Theatre	
2024	Nine	Claudia Nardi	The Kennedy Center	
2023	The Light in the Piazza	Franca Naccarelli	New York City Center Encores!	
2022	A Man of No Importance	Adele Rice	Classic Stage Company	
2019-2022	My Fair Lady	Eliza Doolittle	North American Equity Tour	
2019	My Fair Lady	Eliza Doolittle	Lincoln Center Theater	

== Film and television ==
Filmography for film and television roles
Year	Title	Role	Notes	Source
2025	Law & Order: Special Victims Unit	Skylar Wright	Season 27, Episode 6 "Under the Influence"	
2024	The Eyes of the World: From D-Day to VE Day	Self	PBS Special	
2022	Beltline to Broadway	Self	Podcast	
2021	New Amsterdam	Shenaz Shetty	Season 3, Episode 1 "The New Normal"	

== Discography ==
=== Singles and featured recordings ===
- "Around the World" (2025) — composed by Hashem Nazih, featuring Shereen Ahmed; released in connection with the Grand Egyptian Museum
- Parting Gift: The Songs of Gerald Ginsburg (2024)
  - "Velvet Shoes"
- Out of Myself: Songs of Peter Foley Live (2023)
  - "Yellow Fields" (with Jason Gotay)
  - "The Sadness" (with Manoel Feliciano)
  - "Rather Private Thoughts"

== Awards and affiliations ==
In 2020, Ahmed was named a "40 Under 40" awardee by the Arab America Foundation, an annual recognition program for accomplished Arab Americans under the age of 40. She serves as a global ambassador for Education for Employment (EFE), a nonprofit supporting youth development in the Middle East and North Africa. At the United Nations 14th Conference of States Parties, Ahmed was an invited speaker alongside director Michael Arden, offering a discussion on disability, diversity, and inclusion.
