= Lucy Perkins Carner =

American sociologist and pacifist (1886–1983)

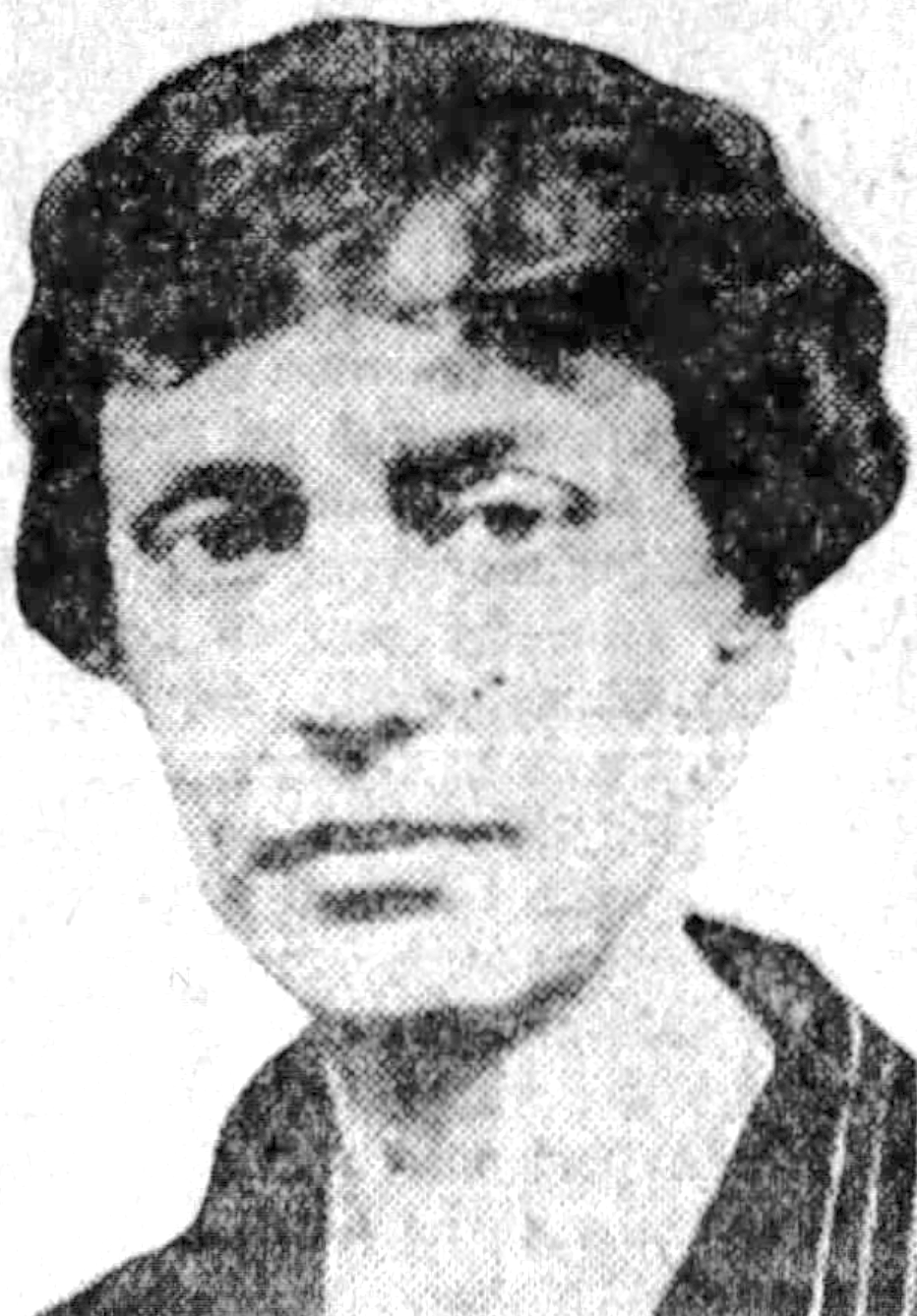
- Lucy Perkins Carner, from a 1925 newspaper
- Born: November 30, 1886; York, Pennsylvania
- Died: February 20, 1983 (aged 96); Germantown, Pennsylvania
- Occupation(s): Sociologist, activist, pacifist

Lucy Perkins Carner (November 30, 1886 – February 20, 1983) was an American sociologist, civil rights activist and pacifist. She was a national executive of the YWCA, and held national roles in peace organizations, including the Women's International League for Peace and Freedom.

== Early life and education ==
Carner was born in York, Pennsylvania, the daughter of Albert Bigelow Carner and Mary Hannah Perkins Carner. Her father taught mathematics and was active as a Presbyterian elder and trustee in York.

Carner graduated from Bryn Mawr College in 1908, and earned a master's degree in sociology from Columbia University in 1924, with a thesis paper titled "Unionizing New York City Women Office Workers." She also studied at the University of Chicago and the London School of Economics in the 1930s.

== Career ==
"Miss Lucy P. Carner is one of the outstanding leaders of the professional staff of the National Board of the Y.W.C.A.," reported a Pennsylvania newspaper in 1936. She was executive secretary of the National Industrial Department and of the National Service Division of the Young Women's Christian Association (YWCA). She was based in Chicago from 1937 to 1952, as head of the education and recreation divisions of the Welfare Council of Metropolitan Chicago. After 1952, she lived in Philadelphia, where she was an adjunct professor at her alma mater, Bryn Mawr College.

Carner served on the boards of the Women's International League for Peace and Freedom, American Friends Service Committee, the Fellowship of Reconciliation, the War Resisters League, and the United World Federalists. She was a member of the American Civil Liberties Union (ACLU), the National Women's Trade Union League of America, and the NAACP. She was blacklisted as a speaker by the Daughters of the American Revolution. She participated in sit-ins with the Congress on Racial Equality in the 1940s. Into her eighties, she was active in protests against war.

== Publications ==
- "Religious Perplexities" (1923)
- "Color is Irrelevant" (1941)
- The First One Hundred Years of the Young Women's Christian Association of Germantown, 1870-1970
- The Settlement Way in Philadelphia (1964)
- "Jane Addams, Incorrigible Democrat" (1965)

== Personal life ==
Carner was a Quaker. She moved into a Quaker retirement home in Germantown, Pennsylvania in 1972, and she died there in 1983, at the age of 96. Her papers are in the Swarthmore College Peace Collection.
