= From Nowhere (film) =

- Theatrical release poster
- Directed by: Matthew Newton
- Written by: Matthew Newton; Kate Ballen
- Produced by: Matthew Newton; Kate Ballen
- Starring: Julianne Nicholson; Denis O'Hare; J. Mallory McCree; Octavia Chavez-Richmond; Chinasa Ogbuagu; Raquel Castro; Tashiana Washington
- Cinematography: Jay Keitel
- Edited by: Betsy Kagen
- Production company: No Place for Films
- Distributed by: FilmRise
- Release dates: March 12, 2016 (SXSW); February 17, 2017 (United States)
- Running time: 89 minutes
- Country: United States
- Language: English
- Box office: $8,109

From Nowhere is a 2016 American drama film directed by Matthew Newton and written by Matthew Newton and Kate Ballen. The film stars Julianne Nicholson, Denis O'Hare, J. Mallory McCree, Octavia Chavez-Richmond, Chinasa Ogbuagu, Raquel Castro and Tashiana Washington. The film was released on February 17, 2017, by FilmRise. Three undocumented teenagers—a Dominican girl, an African boy and a Peruvian girl—are about to graduate high school in the Bronx, while working with a teacher and a lawyer to try to get proper documents to stay in the U.S. Forced to grow up quickly and navigate problems most adults don't even have to face, the students are really just American teenagers who want to be with their friends, fall in love, and push back against authority.

== Cast ==
- Julianne Nicholson as Jackie
- Denis O'Hare as Isaac
- J. Mallory McCree as Moussa
- Octavia Chavez-Richmond as Sophie
- Chinasa Ogbuagu as Maryam
- Raquel Castro as Alyssa
- Tashiana Washington as Amina
- Sydni Beaudoin as Sara
- Jim Norton as Louis
- Portia Johnson
- Helen Beyene
- Erica Camarano as Carlita
- Joseph Castillo-Midyett as Javier
- Emilio Cuesta as Mike
- Shenell Edmonds
- Donté Grey as Bobby
- Olli Haaskivi as Mr. McGrath
- Eliud Kauffman as Emilio
- Anita Petry as Lola
- Luke Rosen as Fitzgerald
- A.J. Shively as Chris

== Release ==
The film premiered at South by Southwest on March 12, 2016. The film was released on February 17, 2017, by FilmRise.
