= Unlock'd =

2013 American musical

- Image from the Original Off-Broadway Production
- Music: Derek Gregor
- Lyrics: Sam Carner
- Book: Sam Carner
- Premiere: June 16, 2013: The Duke Theater, New York City

Unlock'd is an original musical written by American songwriting duo Carner and Gregor. The musical premiered Off-Broadway at the Duke Theater on June 16, 2013.

== Production history ==
=== Background ===
Unlock'd is a recipient of a 2004 Richard Rodgers Award and went on to win "Best in Fest" at the New York Musical Theatre Festival in 2007. Unlock'd was also featured at the New Works Festival in Palo Alto and the Ravinia Festival outside of Chicago.

== Productions ==
Unlock'd premiered Off-Broadway at the Duke Theater on June 16, 2013 for a limited run. When met with positive reviews from critics, the run was extended through July 20, 2013. The musical was directed and choreographed by Marlo Hunter, who won the Joe A. Callaway Award from the Stage Directors and Choreographers Society for her work.

== Original cast ==
Character	Off-Broadway (2013)
Belinda	Jillian Gottlieb
Clarissa	Jennifer Blood
Baron	Sydney James Harcourt
Edwin	A.J. Shively
Esther	Maria Couch
Ariella	Chandler Reeves
Barney	Hansel Tan
The Maid	Emily Rogers
The Gardener	Lukas Poost

== Synopsis ==
Based on Alexander Pope's poem The Rape of the Lock, Unlock'd takes place in 18th century England, and focuses on the romantic entanglements of four main characters and the chaos that ensues after a lock of the vain and beautiful Belinda's hair goes missing.
