= La Piscine (film) =

1969 film by Jacques Deray

- Theatrical release poster
- Directed by: Jacques Deray
- Written by: Jean-Emmanuel Conil (Note: Original screenplay); Jacques Deray (Note: Adaptation and dialogues); Jean-Claude Carrière
- Produced by: Gérard Beytout
- Starring: Alain Delon; Romy Schneider; Maurice Ronet; Jane Birkin; Paul Crauchet
- Cinematography: Jean-Jacques Tarbès
- Edited by: Paul Cayatte
- Music by: Michel Legrand
- Production companies: Société Nouvelle de Cinématographie; Tritone Films
- Distributed by: Société Nouvelle de Cinématographie (France); Variety Distribution (Italy)
- Release dates: 31 January 1969 (France); 5 April 1969 (Italy)
- Running time: 124 minutes (French version); 114 minutes (English version)
- Countries: France; Italy
- Languages: French; English (Note: The film was released in both French and English-language versions.)
- Box office: 3,010,464 admissions (France)

La Piscine (The Swimming Pool) is a 1969 psychological thriller film directed by Jacques Deray and starring Alain Delon, Romy Schneider, Maurice Ronet and Jane Birkin.

Set in summertime on the French Riviera, it is a drama of sexual jealousy and possessiveness. Both French and English-language versions of the film were made, with the actors filmed speaking English for the international release, which was unusual at a time when films were always either dubbed or subtitled. The 114-minute international release, shorter than the French version, also had slightly different editing.

== Plot ==
Jean-Paul, a writer, and Marianne, his girlfriend for just over two years, are holidaying at a friend's villa near Saint-Tropez. There is a tension in their relationship which excites Marianne: the film begins with a scene in which they are together beside the villa's swimming pool and she urges him to scratch her back. He does as she asks, but then throws her into the pool and jumps in after her. In a later scene he takes a branch and uses it to lash her bare buttocks, playfully but with a force that increases as the scene cuts away.

Harry, an old friend and record producer who was Marianne's lover before Jean-Paul, arrives for a visit, surprising the couple by bringing along his 18-year-old daughter Penelope, whose existence they had not previously known about. Marianne, without asking Jean-Paul, invites Harry and Penelope to stay.

The four stay together and Harry draws Marianne back towards him as the days go by. Taunting Jean-Paul for having given up serious writing to work in advertising, Harry drinks a great deal and throws a surprise party while Jean-Paul, a recovering alcoholic, stays sober. Meanwhile, it becomes clear that Penelope neither likes nor respects her father, whom she has barely known while growing up. She and Jean-Paul become close and spend a day alone together by the sea.

That night, while the women are asleep, Harry drunkenly confronts Jean-Paul and accuses him of seducing Penelope to revenge his own shortcomings on his more successful friend. Trying to punch Jean-Paul, Harry falls into the pool and is too drunk to swim. Jean-Paul, who has also been drinking, at first stops him from climbing out of the water, then deliberately pushes Harry under and holds him down until he drowns. He covers up the crime by stripping Harry's clothes off and placing fresh trousers and a shirt at the poolside to make it look like an accident.

After the funeral, a policeman, Inspector Lévêque, visits the house more than once. He confides to Marianne his reasons for doubting the story of an accident, that Harry had been wearing his watch, which was expensive and not waterproof, and that there is no trace of sweat on the clothes he was supposed to have been wearing. When she tells Jean-Paul, he confesses everything to her, and she goes to see Harry's clothes, hidden in the cellar, that would have given him away. But when she does not take this evidence to the police, the inspector reluctantly suspends the inquiry.

Marianne takes Penelope to the airport and sees her off as she returns to her mother. When Penelope demands the truth about her father's death, Marianne assures her it really was an accident. She and Jean-Paul are then about to leave the villa when she tells him that they will not go together. She calls for a taxi but he places his hand on the telephone, cutting off her call and silencing her. In the end, neither leaves that day, and in the film's final shot they stand side by side looking out the window at the swimming pool, and then embrace.

In the English language version there is more to the ending. They stand side by side looking out of the window at the swimming pool, but then it cuts to an elevated view of the driveway to the villa. A Police van has arrived and the Inspector gets out accompanied by a uniformed Policeman.

== Cast ==
- Romy Schneider as Marianne
- Alain Delon as Jean-Paul Leroy
- Maurice Ronet as Harry Lannier
- Jane Birkin as Penelope Lannier
- Paul Crauchet as Inspector Lévêque

== Production ==
The filming began 19 August and finished 19 October 1968. French designer André Courrèges created many custom pieces for the film, such as the swimsuits worn by Schneider and Birkin. It was the first of the nine films Delon and director Jacques Deray made together, and the only one the star did not produce. It also marked the onscreen reunion of a 1960s 'couple mythique' Alain Delon and Romy Schneider. Schneider had dramatically broken up with Delon two years earlier and married German director and actor Harry Meyen in Berlin. She had a child, but Delon never truly let go. He began pursuing her again soon after their split, attempting to reconcile despite her new life. His determination was evident when he insisted on her being cast in the film, even threatening to quit if she was not included—despite producer's misgivings. During and after filming, Delon continued his relentless pursuit, and though Schneider repeatedly refused, their undeniable emotional connection translated into palpable on-screen chemistry. His efforts to win her back persisted long after the film, spanning much of her life and adding an emotional depth to their real and cinematic legacy.

It was during the making of this film that the Marković affair broke out. The body of Stevan Marković, Delon's bodyguard, was discovered in a public dump in the village of Élancourt, Yvelines, on 1 October 1968.

== Reception ==
La Piscine was the fourth most popular film at the French box office in 1969. The film was released in the United Kingdom as The Sinners to limited box office response. It was released in Italy with 20 minutes cut out, but was a popular success.

The Los Angeles Times called it a "handsome, stunningly designed film" which was at its best in "the deft way in which it coolly depicts how beautiful, chic people, dedicated to a sophisticate, amoral view of love, can be utterly defenseless against an onslaught of passion – a favorite Gallic theme."The Guardian wrote: "Erotic languour turns gradually into fear and then horror in this gripping and superbly controlled psychological thriller" where "something in the very lineaments of the pool itself creates their own awful destiny: it is a primordial swamp of desire, a space in which there is nothing to do but laze around, furtively looking at semi-naked bodies."

La Piscine was restored and re-released in theaters during the summer of 2021, becoming a surprise hit. Scheduled to run at the Film Forum in New York for two weeks, it ended up running for 18 weeks, causing Glynnis MacNicol of The New York Times to declare: "If there is a film of New York's 2021 summer, this may be it." However, the film was "dismissed as gossip-column fodder in its time." Glenn Kenny of The New York Times commented, "Pretty people behaving poorly in beautiful settings is something we don't see as much of in cinema as we used to. This is a master class in the subgenre, and one of unusual depth." Writing for The New Yorker, critic Richard Brody was less than enthusiastic about the film's 2021 revival. He noted, "I paid it little attention, in the hope that, given its dry and flimsy mediocrity, it would just blow away into the oblivion whence it emerged." He went on to declare the film a "faux-hip empty shell of faux modernity."

On the review aggregator website Rotten Tomatoes, the film holds an approval rating of 95% based on 19 reviews, with an average rating of 7.4/10. Metacritic, which uses a weighted average, assigned the film a score of 76 out of 100, based on 9 critics, indicating "generally favorable" reviews.

== Legacy ==
An excerpt of the film was used in the Christian Dior Eau Sauvage cologne advertising campaign drawing on the legacy of Alain Delon.

In a 2018 interview, Alain Delon said that because his ex-lover Romy Schneider and good friend Maurice Ronet both died prematurely and under tragic circumstances, revisiting the film was simply too painful for him.

=== Remakes ===
The 2016 film A Bigger Splash, directed by Luca Guadagnino and starring Ralph Fiennes, Tilda Swinton, Matthias Schoenaerts, and Dakota Johnson, is loosely based on La Piscine. The American film Other People's Bodies is a 2025 queer reimagining of La Piscine directed by Alan Brown in which four former friends and lovers reunite on a hot summer weekend.
