= Carner and Gregor =

American musical theatre songwriting duo

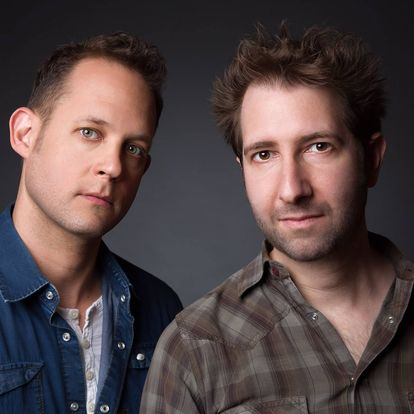

Background information
- Origin: New York City, New York, United States
- Genre: Musical theatre
- Members: Sam Carner; Derek Gregor
- Website: carnerandgregor.com

Carner and Gregor are an American musical theatre songwriting duo consisting of lyricist-librettist Sam Carner and composer Derek Gregor. Prominent works include Unlock'd, Island Song, and Techies!, and among others. They are the recipients of the 2004 Richard Rodgers Award for Musical Theater, the Kleban Prize, and the John Wallowitch Award. They also have had thirteen songs nominated for "Best Song" or "Best Comedic Song" by the Manhattan Association of Cabarets and Clubs, winning for "The Egg Nog Song."

== Early lives ==
Sam Carner attended Yale University as an undergraduate, where his play Just Call Me Eli won the Yale Dramatic Association's John Golden Prize for Best Student-Written Musical in 2000. He graduated in 2001 and enrolled in New York University's Graduate Musical Theatre Writing Program with a Departmental Fellowship.

Derek Gregor graduated from Skidmore College in 2000. The next year, he started the rock band M-Lab, for which he was the keyboardist from 2001 to 2011.

== Partnership ==
Carner and Gregor met at New York University's Tisch Graduate Musical Theatre Writing Program in 2001, where they partnered for their class project. The two have collaborated ever since.

=== Unlock'd ===
Based on Alexander Pope's mock-heroic narrative poem The Rape of the Lock, Unlock'd is a two-act musical that takes place in 18th century England. It focuses on the romantic entanglements of four main characters and the chaos that ensues after a lock of the vain and beautiful Belinda's hair goes missing.

The team received a Richard Rodgers Award for Unlock'd in 2004. The show went on to win "Best in Fest" at the New York Musical Theatre Festival in 2007, as well as two Talkin' Broadway Summer Theatre Festival Citations. Unlock'd was also featured at the TheatreWorks New Works Festival in Palo Alto, California, and the Ravinia Festival outside of Chicago.

Unlock'd, presented by the Prospect Theater Company, opened Off-Broadway at The Duke on 42nd Street on June 16, 2013. The show was scheduled to run through July 13 but was extended to July 20, 2013. The show was directed and choreographed by Marlo Hunter, who won the Joe A. Callaway Award for her musical staging of the production, and starred Jillian Gottlieb as Belinda, Jennifer Blood as Clarissa, Sydney James Harcourt as Roderick Shearing (the Baron), A.J. Shively as Edwin, Maria Couch as Esther, Catherine LeFrere as Avia, Chris Gunn as Umbriel, Adam Daveline as Caleb, Chandler Reeves as Ariella, Hansel Tan as Barney, Emily Rogers as The Maid, and Lukas Poost as The Gardener.

=== Island Song ===
Telling the story of five contemporary New Yorkers as they pursue their passions, resist distraction, and live out a "twisted love affair" with the city," Island Song captures every urbanite's triumphs, disappointments, and ever-tested perspective."

The musical had workshops at Princeton University and Western Carolina University in 2012, and Seattle's Balagan Theater and the Indiana Festival of Theater in 2013. It had a workshop production at the Bloomington Playwrights Project in January and February 2014. Island Song has had concert presentations at (le) Poisson Rouge in New York, Crawfish in Tokyo, the St. James Studio in London, and the Comedie Nation in Paris.

Island Song premiered at the Adirondack Theatre Festival in 2016 and went onto a production by Rose Bruford actor-muso students at the Stratford Circus Theatre in March 2017, directed by Iain Reekie. The Canadian premiere took place July 2018 in North Bay, Ontario, Canada. Subsequent licensed productions have taken place in New York City, London, Singapore, Bologna, Tokyo, and around the US.

In 2017 Carner & Gregor released a studio cast album of Island Song featuring Jeremy Jordan, Lilli Cooper, Kimiko Glenn, Jackie Burns, and Troy Iwata.

Island Song was part of the Uproar Theatrics catalogue when the company launched in 2021. In February of 2025 it was announced the musical would be available to license through Broadway Licensing.

=== Techies ===
Set in the theater department of Westside High School, Techies follows the life of Joan, a student stage manager, who's caught in the middle of a war between the department's actors and techies. While they fight for a place on their school's hierarchy ladder (even if it's the lowest rung), Joan fights to make everyone work together, and maybe even win the heart of her set-builder crush while doing so.

Techies had its first workshop production in February 2019 at the Rockford University in Illinois. The Rockford students also performed a concert at The Duplex in New York City, with the lead performers being Janelle Good (Joan), Elizabeth Dutch (Vanessa), Cecelia Boynton (Night Train), Jordan Bruster (Ash), and Austin Rubinoski (Oliver).

The show has gone to have several subsequent workshops and concert appearances, including at the International Thespian Festival in 2019 and at Slippery Rock University in 2021.

Techies was set to make its official world premiere at the Edinburgh Festival Fringe in Scotland. The show was scheduled to run from August 7 to 30, 2026 at the Alba Theatre at Hill Street Theatre.

=== Other work ===
Their musical Second Line, set in post-Katrina New Orleans, is in development, and received readings and workshops at Pace University, the Bloomington Playwrights Project and the Oregon Shakespeare Festival. More development was planned in New Orleans in 2023.

Their TYA short musical Love Splat regularly tours the country with TheatreWorks USA.

== Popular songs ==
- "Advice to a Young Firefly"
- "After Hours"
- "All At Once"
- "Dancing in Pairs"
- "Hair Song"
- "I'll Take It All"
- "Make It Here"
- "Man Crush"
- "New York, Do You Care?"
- "Shoulders Down"
- "Sing, But Don't Tell"
- "So Far From Pennsylvania"
- "Stay Awhile"
- "TMI"
- "Traffic Island Song"
- "Waiting"
- "Wall Lovin'"
- "What Do You Do With Your Arms"

== Awards ==
- 2016 Manhattan Association of Cabaret and Clubs Win for Special Material (The Egg Nog Song)
- 2015 Kleban Prize for Most Promising Librettist (Sam Carner)
- 2015 Manhattan Association of Cabaret and Clubs Nominations for Best Song ("Advice to a Young Firefly") and Best Comic/Novelty Song ("Savin' It")
- 2014 John Wallowitch Award
- 2014 Manhattan Association of Cabaret and Clubs Nominations for Best Song (So Far From Pennsylvania) and Best Special Musical Material (Wall Lovin')
- 2012 Manhattan Association of Cabaret and Clubs Nomination for Best Song ("Make It Here")
- 2011 Manhattan Association of Cabaret and Clubs Nominations for Best Song ("After Hours") and Best Special Musical Material ("Sing, But Don't Tell")
- 2007 Talkin' Broadway Summer Theatre Festival citations
  - Outstanding New Musical
  - Outstanding Original Theatrical Score (Wildcard Citation)
- 2004 Richard Rodgers Award for Musical Theater
