= 1919 in music =

This is a list of notable events in music that took place in the year 1919.

== Specific locations ==
- 1919 in British music
- 1919 in Norwegian music

== Specific genres ==
- 1919 in country music
- 1919 in jazz

== Events ==
- January 18 – The pianist Paderewski becomes Prime Minister of Poland.
- April 7 – The Original Dixieland Jass Band brings Dixieland jazz to England, opening a 15-month tour at the Hippodrome, London.
- May 3 – The National Association of Negro Musicians is established in Washington, D.C. under the leadership of Nora Holt and Henry Grant.
- July 22 – The Ballets Russes gives the world premiere of Manuel de Falla's ballet El sombrero de tres picos (The Three-Cornered Hat) in London.
- August – Josef Matthias Hauer devises his own twelve-tone technique of composition.
- August 19 – The Southern Syncopated Orchestra, visiting the UK, perform for the future King Edward VIII of the United Kingdom. Ernest Ansermet subsequently writes an enthusiastic review of the orchestra's performances in London, singling out Sidney Bechet – one of the first serious pieces of jazz criticism.
- October 27 – Edward Elgar's Cello Concerto is premiered in London with Felix Salmond as soloist; the performance is a disaster because Elgar (as conductor) is given inadequate rehearsal time with the London Symphony Orchestra.
- unknown dates
  - The Louisiana Five are advertised as playing "Modern Jazz".
  - Soprano Elsie Griffin joins the D'Oyly Carte Opera Company.
  - Flautist Nicholas Laucella joins the Metropolitan Opera Orchestra under the direction of Artur Bodanzky.
  - Johan Wagenaar becomes director of the Royal Conservatory at the Hague.

== Published popular music ==
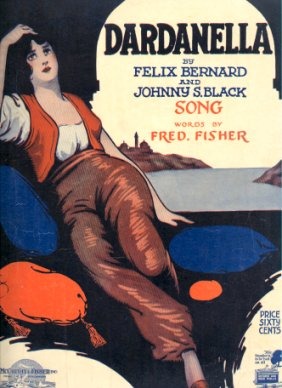
Cover of sheet music "Dardanella", 1919

- "Alcoholic Blues" w. Edward Laska, m. Albert Von Tilzer
- "Alexander's Band Is Back In Dixieland" w. Jack Yellen m. Albert Gumble
- "Alice Blue Gown" w. Joseph McCarthy m. Harry Tierney
- "All The Quakers Are Shoulder Shakers Down In Quaker Town" w. Bert Kalmar & Edgar Leslie m. Pete Wendling
- "And He'd Say, "Oo-La-La! Wee-Wee!"" w. George Jessel, m. Harry Ruby
- "Any Old Place With You" w. Lorenz Hart m. Richard Rodgers
- "Baby, Won't You Please Come Home?" w.m. Charles Warfield & Clarence Williams
- "Blues My Naughty Sweetie Gives To Me" w.m. Charles McCarron, Casey Morgan & Arthur Swanstrom
- "The Boys Who Won't Come Home" w. Harry Hamilton m. Ed. Thomas
- "Camp Meeting Blues" by Dabney's Band
- "Cielito Lindo" w.m. Quirino Mendoza y Cortez
- "Daddy Long Legs" w. Sam M. Lewis & Joe Young
- "Dardanella" w. Fred Fisher m. Felix Bernard & Johnny S. Black
- "Don't Dilly Dally on the Way" w.m. Fred W. Leigh & Charles Collins
- "Grönnens Laid", w. Geert Teis Pzn., m. G.R. Jager
- "Hold Me" w.m. Art Hickman & Ben Black
- "I Ain't Gonna Give Nobody None O' This Jelly Roll" w. Spencer Williams m. Clarence Williams
- "I Gave Her That" w. m. B. G. De Sylva & Al Jolson
- "I Lost My Heart In Dixieland" w.m. Irving Berlin
- "I Might be Your "Once-In-A-While"" w. Robert B. Smith m. Victor Herbert
- "I Never Realized" w.m. Cole Porter
- "I Wish I Could Shimmy Like My Sister Kate" w.m. Armand J. Piron

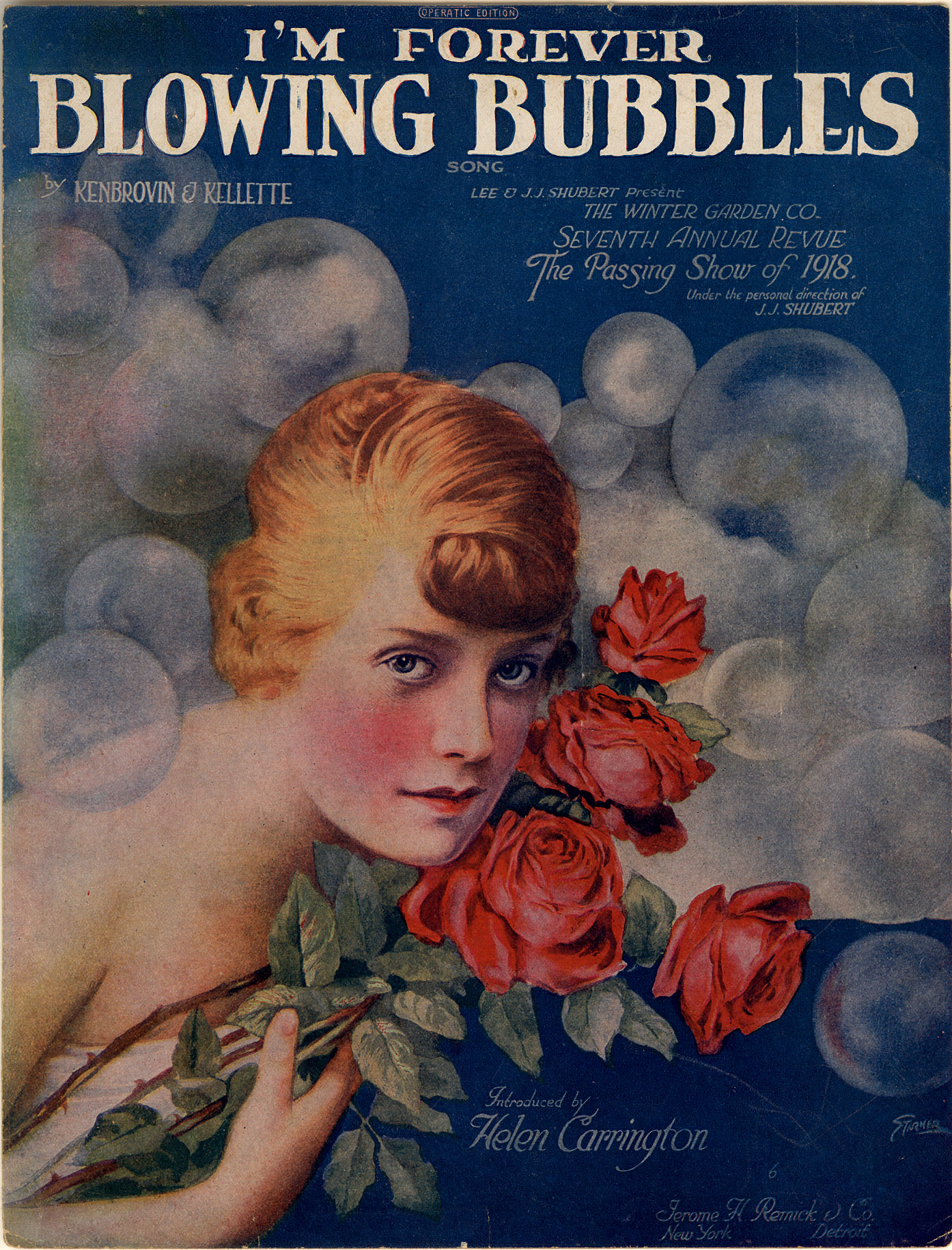
Sheet music cover for "I'm Forever Blowing Bubbles"

- "I'm Forever Blowing Bubbles" w. John W. Kellette m. Jaan Kenbrovin (pseudonym of James Kendis, James Brockman and Nat Vincent)
- "I'm Going Back To Yarrawonga" by Corporal Neil McBeath
- "Indian Summer" w. Al Dubin m. Victor Herbert Words 1939.
- "Irene" w. Joseph McCarthy m. Harry Tierney. Introduced by Edith Day in the musical Irene
- "I've Got My Captain Working for Me Now" w.m. Irving Berlin
- "Jazz Baby" w. Blanche Merrill & William Jerome m. William Jerome
- "Just Like a Gipsy" w.m. Seymour Simons & Nora Bayes
- "The Lamplit Hour" m. Arthur A. Penn, w. Thomas Burke
- "Let The Rest Of The World Go By" w. J. Keirn Brennan m. Ernest R. Ball
- "Letter Song" by William LeBaron
- "Little Girls, Goodbye" w. William LeBaron m. Victor Jacobi
- "Mammy O' Mine" w. William Tracey m. Maceo Pinkard
- "Mandy" w.m. Irving Berlin
- "Mirandy" w.m. James Reese Europe, Noble Sissle & Eubie Blake
- "The Moon Shines On The Moonshine" w. Frank De Witt m. Robin Hood Bowers. Introduced by Harry Williams in the revue Ziegfeld Follies of 1919
- "My Baby's Arms" w. Joseph McCarthy m. Harry Tierney
- "My Isle Of Golden Dreams" w. Gus Kahn m. Walter Blaufuss
- "Nobody Knows (And Nobody Seems To Care)" w.m. Irving Berlin
- "O (Oh!)" w. Byron Gay m. Arnold Johnson
- "Oh By Jingo! (Oh By Gee, You're The Only Girl For Me)" w. Lew Brown m. Albert Von Tilzer
- "Oh How I Laugh When I Think How I Cried About You" w. Roy Turk & George Jessel, m. Willy White
- "Oh! What A Pal Was Mary" w. Edgar Leslie & Bert Kalmar m. Pete Wendling
- "Old-Fashioned Garden" w.m. Cole Porter
- "On Miami Shore" w. William LeBaron m. Victor Jacobi
- "On Patrol In No Man's Land" w.m. James Reese Europe, Noble Sissle & Eubie Blake
- "Open Up The Golden Gates To Dixieland And Let Me Into Paradise" w. Jack Yellen m. Gus Van & Joe Schenck
- "Patches" w. J. Will Callahan m. Lee S. Roberts
- "Peggy" w. Harry Williams m. Neil Moret
- "A Pretty Girl Is Like A Melody" w.m. Irving Berlin
- "Prohibition Blues" w. Ring Lardner m. Nora Bayes
- "Royal Garden Blues" w.m. Clarence Williams & Spencer Williams
- "Sahara (We'll Soon Be Dry Like You)" w. Alfred Bryan m. Jean Schwartz. Introduced in the musical Monte Cristo, Jr.

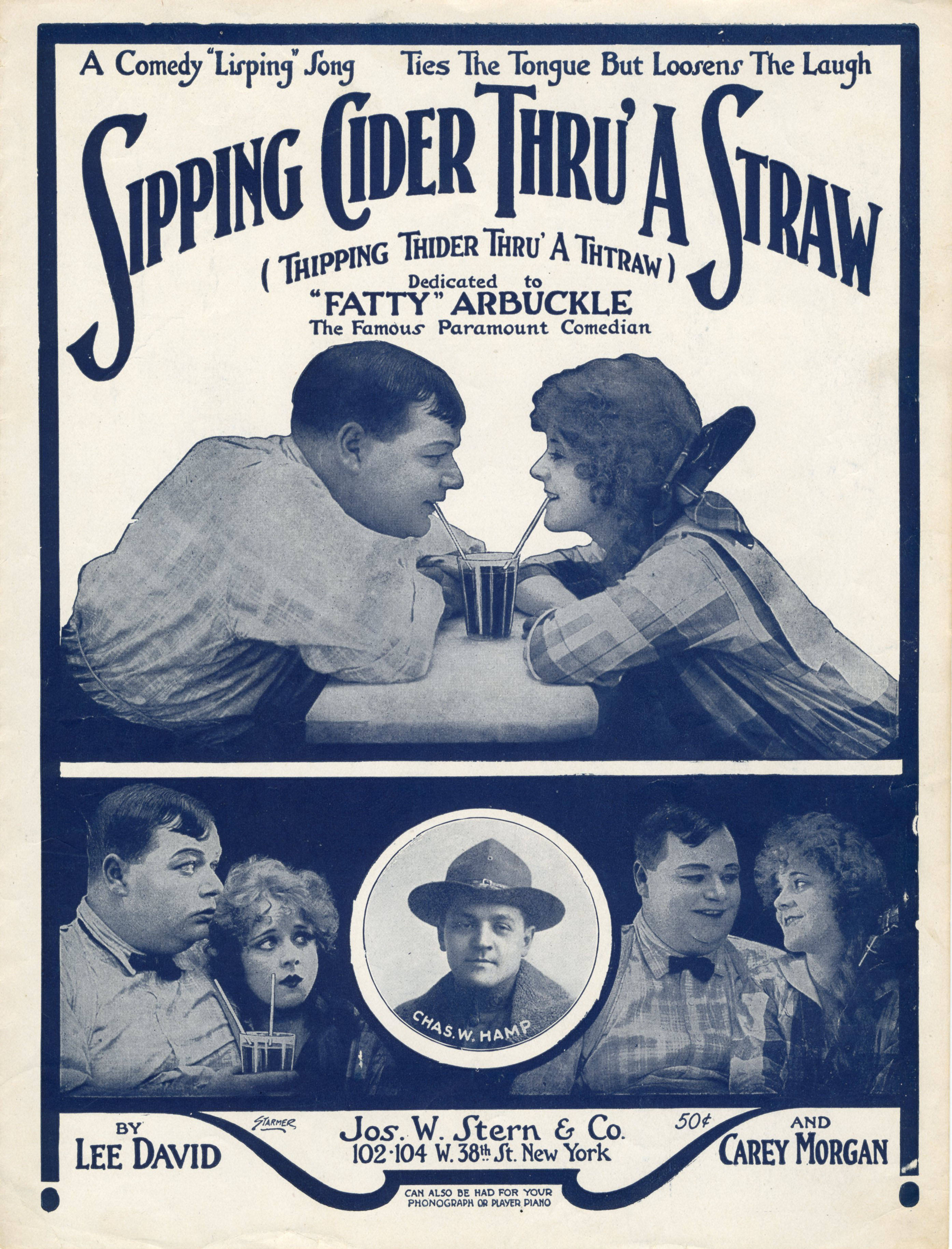
Sheet music cover for "Sipping Cider Through A Straw"

- "Sipping Cider Through A Straw" w.m. Carey Morgan & Lee David
- "Smilin' Through" w.m. Arthur A. Penn
- "Someday Sweetheart" w.m. John Spikes & Benjamin Spikes
- "Sugar Blues" w. Lucy Fletcher m. Clarence Williams
- "Swanee" w. Irving Caesar m. George Gershwin
- "Sweet Kisses That Came In The Night" w. Lew Brown & Eddie Buzzell m. Albert Von Tilzer
- "Take Me To The Land Of Jazz" m. Pete Wendling
- "Take Your Girlie To The Movies (If You Can't Make Love At Home)" w. Edgar Leslie & Bert Kalmar m. Pete Wendling
- "There's More To The Kiss Than the X-X-X" w. Irving Caesar m. George Gershwin
- "Tulip Time" w. Gene Buck m. Dave Stamper
- "Wait Till You Get Them Up In The Air, Boys" w. Lew Brown m. Harry Von Tilzer
- "What'll We Do On A Saturday Night When The Town Goes Dry" w.m. Harry Ruby
- "When They're Old Enough To Know Better, It's Better To Leave Them Alone" w. Sam M. Lewis & Joe Young m. Harry Ruby
- "Who Played Poker With Pocahontas When John Smith Went Away?" w. Sam M. Lewis & Joe Young m. Fred Ahlert
- "Winnie The Window Cleaner" w.m. Herman Darewski
- "The World Is Waiting For The Sunrise" w. Eugene Lockhart m. Ernest Seitz
- "You Ain't Heard Nothing Yet" w.m. Al Jolson, Gus Kahn & B. G. DeSylva
- "You Cannot Make Your Shimmy Shake On Tea" w. Rennold Wolf m. Irving Berlin
- "You'd Be Surprised" w.m. Irving Berlin
- "Your Eyes Have Told Me So" w. Gus Kahn & Egbert Van Alstyne m. Walter Blaufuss
- "You're A Million Miles From Nowhere When You're One Little Mile From Home" w. Sam Lewis & Joe Young m. Walter Donaldson

== Hit recordings ==
- "Blues My Naughty Sweetie Gives To Me" by Ted Lewis & His Jazz Band
- "You Ain't Heard Nothing Yet" by Al Jolson
- "How Ya Gonna Keep 'Em Down On The Farm" by Nora Bayes
- "A Pretty Girl Is Like A Melody" by John Steel
- "I'm Forever Blowing Bubbles" by Ben Selvin's Novelty Orchestra
- "The Moon Shines on the Moonshine" by Bert Williams
- "O" by Ted Lewis & His Jazz Band
- "Alcoholic Blues" by Billy Murray
- "Saxophobia" by Rudy Wiedoeft
- "Jazz Baby" by Marion Harris
- "You'd Be Surprised" by Eddie Cantor
- "The Alcoholic Blues" by the Louisiana Five
- "Weary Blues" by Yellow Nunez and the Louisiana Five

== Classical music ==
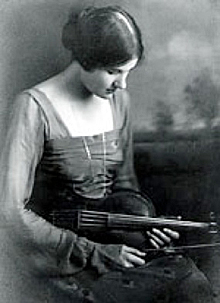
Rebecca Clarke holding her viola in 1919

- Hugo Alfvén - Symphony No. 4 in C minor, Op. 39, "Från havsbandet"
- Granville Bantock - Hamabdil for cello, harp and strings
- Arnold Bax – Tintagel
- Ernest Bloch – Suite for Viola and Orchestra
- Rebecca Clarke – Sonata for Viola and Piano
- Edward Elgar - Cello Concerto in E minor, Op. 85
- Gabriel Fauré – Masques et bergamasques, Op. 112
- Robert Fuchs – Twelve Waltzes, Op. 110, for piano
- Louis Glass – Symphony No. 5 in C major, Op. 57, "Svastika"
- Peder Gram – Concerto for violin and orchestra in D major
- Charles Tomlinson Griffes – The Pleasure-Dome of Kubla Khan
- Alois Hába - String Quartet No. 1, Op. 4
- Johan Halvorsen – Norwegian Rhapsody No. 1
- Paul Hindemith
  - Cello Sonata No. 1, Op. 11, No. 3
  - Viola Sonata No.1 in F major, Op. 11, No. 4
  - Sonata for Solo Viola No. 1, Op. 11, No. 5
- Gustav Holst - Ode to Death, H. 144, Op. 38
- Dorothy Howell – Lamia
- Ernst Krenek - Piano Sonata No. 1 in E-flat, Op. 2
- Darius Milhaud
  - Poèmes de Francis Thompson, Op. 54
  - Les soirées de Pétrograd, Op. 55
  - Machines agricoles, 6 Pastorales for voice and chamber ensemble, Op. 56
  - Suite symphonique No. 2, Op. 57
  - Le bœuf sur le toit, Op. 58 (ballet)
  - Cinéma fantaisie for violin and chamber orchestra, Op. 58b
- Carl Nielsen – Aladdin (for theatre)
- Gabriel Pierné – Sonata for Cello and Piano
- Maurice Ravel - Le Tombeau de Couperin, M68a (orchestration of 4 pieces from M 68)
- Dane Rudhyar – Syntony
- Jean Sibelius - Symphony No. 5 in E-flat major, Op. 82
- Leo Sowerby – Concerto for Harp
- Charles Villiers Stanford – A Song of Agincourt
- Igor Stravinsky
  - The Firebird Suite No. 2
  - Piano-Rag-Music
  - Symphony in E-flat (revised version)
  - Three Pieces for Solo Clarinet
- Joaquín Turina
  - Niñerías, Series 1 Op. 21, for piano
  - Danzas fantásticas Op. 22, two versions: piano solo, and orchestra
- Heitor Villa-Lobos
  - Symphony No. 3, "A guerra" (War)
  - Symphony No. 4, "A vitória" (Victory)

== Opera ==
- Abesalom da Eteri, by Zacharia Paliashvili
- Fennimore and Gerda, by Frederick Delius
- Die Frau ohne Schatten, opera by Richard Strauss (staged)
- Ihre Hoheit, die Tänzerin (Her Highness, the Dancer), operetta by Walter Goetze
- Keto da Kote, by Victor Dolidze
- The Love for Three Oranges, Op. 33, by Sergei Prokofiev
- The Moon Maiden by Rutland Boughton
- The Royal Guest by Hakon Børresen

== Musical theater ==
- Afgar (lyrics by Douglas Furber, music by Charles Cuvillier and book by Fred Thompson and Worton David). London production opened at the Pavilion Theatre on September 17
- Apple Blossoms Broadway production
- Eastward, Ho! London production opened at the Alhambra Theatre on September 9
- George White's Scandals Broadway revue opened at the Liberty Theatre on June 2 and ran for 128 performances
- Irene Broadway production opened at the Vanderbilt Theatre on November 18 and ran for 670 performances
- Joy-Bells London production opened at the Hippodrome Theatre on March 25 and ran for 723 performances
- Kissing Time (music by Ivan Caryll book and lyrics by Guy Bolton and P. G. Wodehouse) London production opened at the Winter Garden Theatre on 20 May and ran for 430 performances.
- The Kiss Call Broadway production
- Linger Longer Letty (Music: Alfred Goodman Lyrics: Bernard Grosman Book: Anne Nichols. Broadway production opened at the Fulton Theatre on November 20 and ran for 69 performances. Starring Charlotte Greenwood.
- Monsieur Beaucaire London production opened at the Prince of Wales Theatre on April 19, transferred to the Palace Theatre on July 29 and ran for 221 performances
- Monsieur Beaucaire Broadway production opened at the New Amsterdam Theatre on December 11 and ran for 143 performances
- Monte Cristo, Jr. Broadway production opened at the Winter Garden Theatre on February 12 and ran for 254 performances
- Oh, Boy! (musical) London production opened on January 27 at the Kingsway Theatre and ran for 167 performances
- The Red Mill London production opened at the Empire Theatre on December 26 and ran for 64 performances
- Sybil Vienna production
- Take It From Me Broadway production opened on March 31 at the 44th Street Theatre and ran for 96 performances
- The Whirligig opened at the Palace Theatre on December 23

== Publications ==
- Gustav Kobbé – The Complete Opera Book (posthumously published)

== Births ==
- January 1 – Yoshio Tabata, singer and guitarist (d. 2013)
- January 14 – Kaifi Azmi, Urdu and Hindi songwriter (d. 2002)
- January 18 – Juan Orrego-Salas, Chilean-American composer (d. 2019
- January 22 – Sid Ramin, arranger (d. 2019)
- January 25
  - Eula Beal, operatic contralto (d. 2008)
  - Norman Newell, English record producer and lyricist (d. 2004)
- January 27 – Ross Bagdasarian (aka David Seville), of The Chipmunks (d. 1972)
- February 1 – Artie Singer, American songwriter, music producer, and bandleader (d. 2008)
- February 2 – Lisa Della Casa, Swiss soprano (d. 2012)
- February 13 – Tennessee Ernie Ford, country musician (d. 1991)
- March 10 – Marion Hutton, big band singer (d. 1987)
- March 15 – George Avakian, jazz record producer (d. 2017)
- March 17 – Nat King Cole, singer and pianist (d. 1965)
- March 19 – Alfred Apaka, Hawaiian singer (d. 1960)
- March 28 – D. K. Pattammal, Indian classical singer (d. 2009)
- April 3 – Ervin Drake, songwriter (d. 2015)
- April 14 – Karel Berman, opera singer and composer (d. 1995)
- April 16 – Merce Cunningham, dancer, choreographer (d. 2009)
- April 21
  - Don Cornell, singer (d. 2004)
  - Roger Doucet, tenor, regular performer of the Canadian national anthem (d. 1981)
- April 25 – Irene Jordan, American opera singer (d. 2016)
- April 29 – Stephen Wilkinson, English conductor and composer (d. 2021)
- May 3 – Pete Seeger, American folk singer (d. 2014)
- May 7 – La Esterella, Flemish singer (d. 2011)
- May 12 – Gerald Bales, Canadian organist and composer (d. 2002)
- May 16 – Liberace, American pianist (d. 1987)
- May 17 – Antonio Aguilar, Mexican singer, actor and producer (d. 2007)
- May 18 – Margot Fonteyn, born Margaret Hookham, English ballerina (d. 1991)
- May 19 – Georgie Auld, jazz musician (d. 1990)
- May 23 – Betty Garrett, actress and dancer (d. 2011)
- May 30 – Joe McQueen, American jazz saxophonist (d. 2019)
- June 11 – Helen Tobias-Duesberg, composer (d. 2010)
- June 17 – Gene de Paul, pianist and composer (d. 1988)
- June 22 – Gower Champion, dancer, choreographer and director (d. 1980)
- July 8 – Ernst Haefliger, Swiss tenor (d. 2007)
- July 10 – Ian Wallace, Scottish bass-baritone opera singer (d. 2009)
- July 27 – Jonathan Sternberg, American conductor, musical director and professor of music (d. 2018)
- July 31 – Norman Del Mar, conductor and music writer (d. 1994)
- August 2 – Carlo Savina, Italian composer and conductor (d. 2002)
- August 11 – Ginette Neveu, violin virtuoso (d. 1949)
- August 13 – George Shearing, English jazz pianist and composer (d. 2011)
- August 17 – Irv Williams, African American jazz saxophonist (d. 2019)
- August 21 – Tommy Reilly, harmonica virtuoso (d. 2000)
- August 24 – Niels Viggo Bentzon, Danish composer (d. 2000)
- September 2 – Marge Champion, dancer and choreographer (d. 2020)
- September 3 – Natalia Clare, ballerina (d. 2007)
- September 4 – Teddy Johnson, popular singer (d. 2018)
- September 16
  - Sven-Erik Bäck, composer (d. 1994)
  - Andy Russell, singer (d. 1992)
- September 21 – Virgilio Savona, Italian singer, songwriter (d. 2009)
- September 24 – Jack Costanzo, American percussionist (d. 2018)
- September 30 – Patricia Neway, operatic soprano and musical theatre actress (d. 2012)
- October 9 – Irmgard Seefried, operatic soprano (d. 1988)
- October 11 – Art Blakey, jazz drummer and bandleader (d. 1990)
- October 18 – Anita O'Day, singer (d. 2006)
- October 20 – Lia Origoni, singer (d. 2022)
- October 23 – Katie Lee, American folk singer (d. 2017)
- October 26 – James E. Myers, songwriter (d. 2001)
- November 5 – Myron Floren, accordionist (d. 2005)
- November 12 – Jackie Washington, Canadian singer-songwriter (died 2009)
- November 15 – Carol Bruce, singer and actress (d. 2007)
- November 23 – Cláudio Santoro, composer (d. 1989)
- December 6 – Blaž Lenger, Croatian folk singer (d. 2006)
- December 8 – Mieczyslaw Weinberg, composer (d. 1996)
- December 10 – Sesto Bruscantini, operatic bass-baritone (d. 2003)
- December 2020 – Reinhold Svensson, Swedish jazz pianist, organist and composer (died 1968)
- December 21 – Nelson Cooke, Australian cellist (d. 2018)
- December 25
  - Naushad Ali, film score composer (d. 2006)
  - Curly Seckler, American bluegrass musician (d. 2017)
- December 30 – David Willcocks, British choral conductor, organist and composer (d. 2015)

== Deaths ==
- January 28 – Charles McCarron, songwriter (b. 1891)
- February 4 – Yelizaveta Lavrovskaya, Russian mezzo-soprano (b. 1845)
- February 18 – Henry Ragas, jazz pianist (b. 1891)
- March 6 – Gialdino Gialdini, Italian composer and conductor (b. 1843)
- March 8 – Auguste Tolbeque, cellist and composer (b. 1830)
- March 13 – Amy Woodforde-Finden, composer (b. 1860)
- March 23 – Henry Blossom, lyricist (b. 1866)
- April 9 – James Reese Europe, jazz musician and composer, band leader (b. 1881) (stabbed in fight)
- April 24 – Camille Erlanger, opera composer (b. 1863)
- April 25 – Augustus D. Juilliard, music patron (b. 1836)
- June 2 – Ernest Ford, conductor and composer (b. 1858)
- June 22 – Julian Scriabin, musical prodigy, pianist and composer (b. 1908) (drowned)
- August 1 – Oscar Hammerstein I, musical theatre impresario (b. 1847)
- August 4 – Ferdinand Thieriot, composer (b. 1838)
- August 9 – Ruggiero Leoncavallo, composer (b. 1857)
- August 18 – Anna Deinet, operatic soprano (b. 1843)
- September 7 – Eloi Sylva, operatic tenor (b. 1843)
- September 11 – Géza Csáth, writer and musician (b. 1887)
- September 27 – Adelina Patti, opera singer (b. 1843)
- October 17 – Sven August Körling, composer of art songs (b. 1842)
- November 19 – Florencio Constantino, operatic tenor (b. 1869)
- December 16 – Luigi Illica, librettist (b. 1857)
- December 21 – Louis Diémer, pianist and composer (b. 1843)
- December 27 – Achilles Alferaki, statesman, artist and composer (b. 1846)
- December 31 – Marie van Zandt, American operatic soprano (b. 1858)
