= The White Hen =

The White Hen may refer to:

- The White Hen, a 1920 novel by Phyllis Campbell
- The White Hen (film), a 1921 silent film based on Campbell's novel
- The White Hen (musical), a 1907 Broadway musical by Gustav Kerker, Roderic C. Penfield, and Paul West
- "The White Hen", a nickname for Pope John XIII

== See also ==
- White Hen Pantry
