= Phyllis Campbell =

Australian born World War I nurse and writer (1894 – 1920)

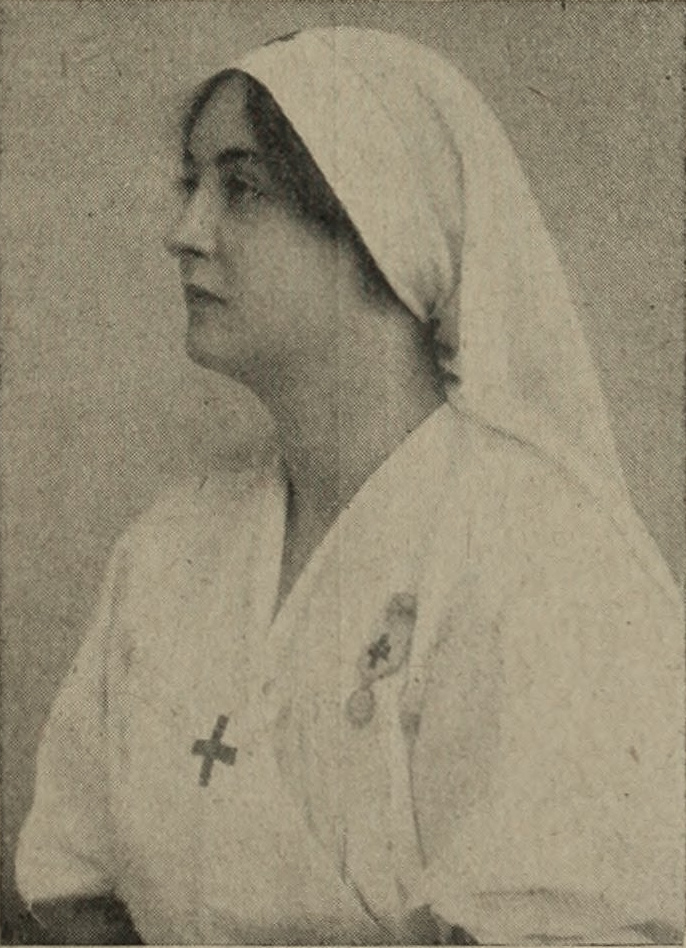
Phyllis Campbell, c. 1915

Phyllis Frances Campbell (1894 – ?) was an Australian born World War I nurse and writer. She chronicled her experiences as a nurse in France during World War I in the memoir Back to the Front: Experiences of a Nurse which was published in 1915, and was the author of two novels published in 1920. According to bibliographer, scholar, and librarian Richard Bleiler, biographical accounts of Campbell's life tend to be sparse and are often contradictory; repeating content that is in error.

== Early life ==
Phyllis Frances Campbell was born in Australia in 1894. She was named after her mother, Phyllis Vivian Campbell, who wrote as a journalist and novelist under the name Frances Campbell. Several biographical accounts claim Phyllis Frances Campbell was born in Scotland, including the one written by William Leonard Courtney with Campbell's presumed authorization in the forward to her 1915 memoir, Back to the Front. However, these accounts are not true; although Phyllis's father, Howard Douglas Campbell Jr., was Scottish and a member of Clan Campbell who was related to the Duke of Argyll. Phyllis's paternal grandfather, Howard Douglas Campbell, Sr. (died, 16 August 1857), served as a captain in the 78th Highlanders.

At the age of seven, Campbell moved with her family from Australia to England. It is likely that the family relocated to England to seek expert medical care for Phyllis's father who had suffered a bad fall that had damaged an artery leading to the development of a debilitating heart condition. Additionally, this change in health had led to a decline in her father's mental state as he struggled to find peace with his new condition of living. Not long after their arrival in England, Campbell's father committed suicide by shooting himself in a Hansom cab in London on March 26, 1901. Letters from John Campbell, 9th Duke of Argyll were found on his body, and the event was widely reported in the international press due to the family connection to the Scottish peer; including The New York Times.

After the death of her father, Campbell's mother supported the family by working as a journalist for the Evening Standard and as a novelist. Her mother sued the steamship company Princess Line, Ltd. in 1912, and Phyllis was called as witness in support of her mother's claim at the trial. The case, Campbell V.S. Princess Line was widely reported in the press, and ultimately became a source of embarrassment for the family. Following the conclusion of the trial, Campbell's mother sent Phyllis and her sister to schools in France; and the two lived thereafter in Paris and Brittany.

== Career as a writer ==
Campbell began her writing career in 1913, contributing articles to The Occult Review using the pseudonym Phil Campbell. Under her own name, she chronicled her experiences as a nurse in France during World War I in the memoir Back to the Front: Experiences of a Nurse which was published in 1915. The work was reportedly written after Campbell fled school in Germany for France and was an account of her work on the front as a nurse treating the wounded during the early part of the war. However, the biographical accounts provided by Campbell and by William Leonard Courtney in his foreword have discrepancies with primary documents, and Campbell lived and attended schools not in Germany but in Paris and Brittany in the time leading up to the outbreak of World War I and her work as a nurse.

Part of Back to the Front recounts tales of French soldiers having religious visions on the battlefield, and because of this the memoir is considered a parallel work to Arthur Machen's short story "The Bowmen" which inspired the legend of the Angels of Mons.

Campbell wrote two novels that were published by Mills & Boon in 1920, The White Hen and Lined with Rags. The White Hen was adapted into a 1921 silent film starring Mary Glynne, Leslie Faber, Pat Somerset, and Cecil Humphreys. It is possible that Campbell was also the author of the ghost story "The Hand of Thais" which was written for performance on English radio on 23 December 1937. Relatively little is known about her life after 1920, including the date and place of her death.
