= Angels of Mons =

World War I fiction and accidental hoax

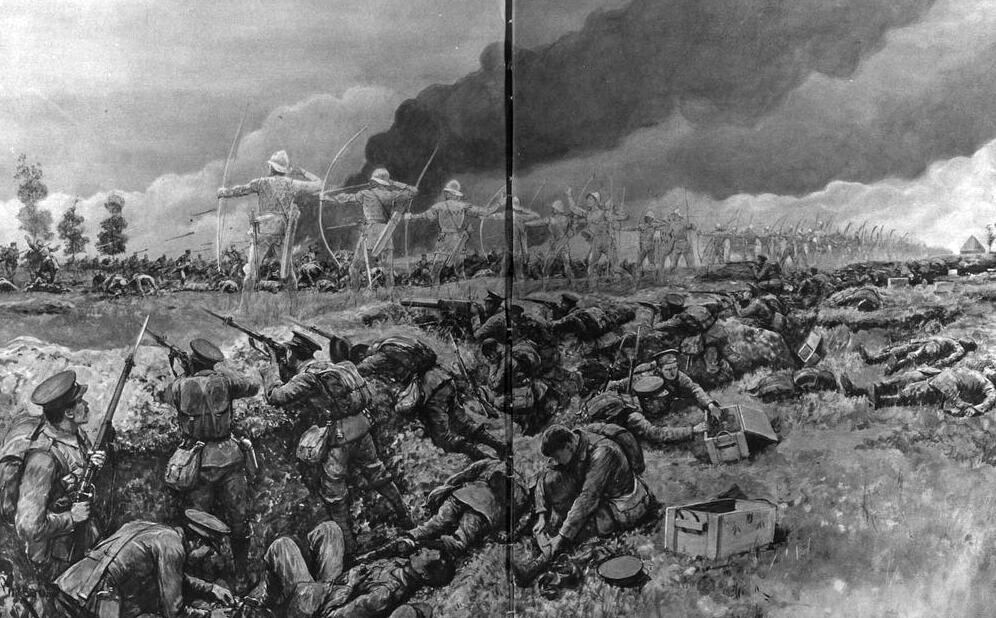
November 29, 1915 – Illustrated London News – The Ghostly Bowmen of Mons fight the Germans.

The legend of the Angels of Mons (German: Die Legende der Engel von Mons, or simply Die Engel von Mons) is one of many stories of the appearance of a variety of supernatural entities which protected the British Army from defeat by the invading forces of the German Empire at the beginning of World War I during the Battle of Mons in Belgium on 23 August 1914.

== History ==
On 22–23 August 1914, the first major engagement of the British Expeditionary Force in the First World War occurred at the Battle of Mons. Advancing German forces were thrown back by heavily outnumbered British troops, who suffered heavy casualties and, being outflanked, were forced into rapid retreat the next day. The retreat and the battle were rapidly perceived by the British public as being a key moment in the war.

=== Arthur Machen and the phantom bowmen ===
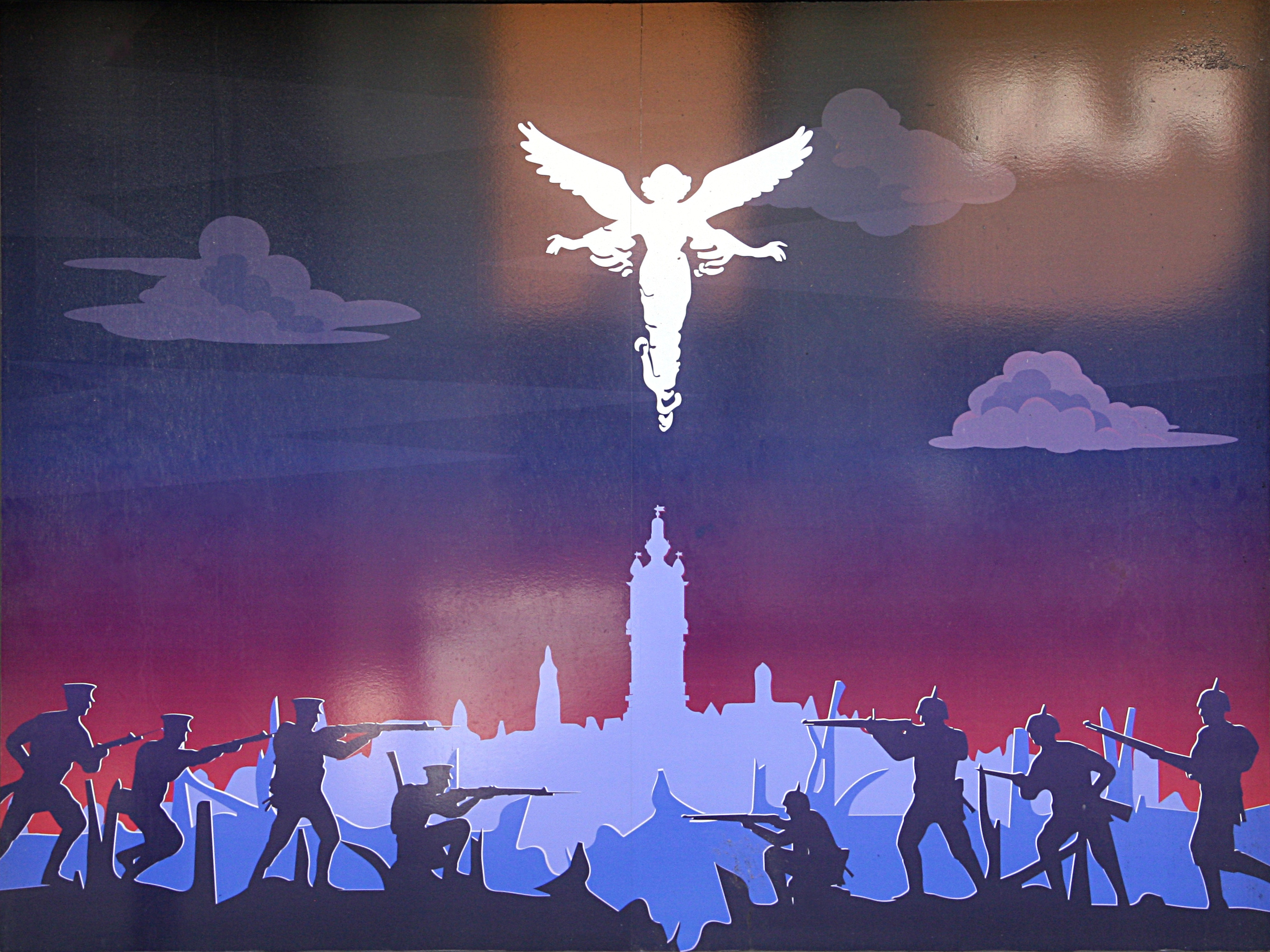
Street art depicting the "legend of the guardian angels of the city of Mons during the battle of August 1914", displayed on a boarded window of a building under repair in Mons, Belgium.

On 29 September 1914, the Welsh author Arthur Machen published a short story entitled "The Bowmen" in The Evening News, inspired by accounts that he had read of the fighting at Mons and an idea he had had soon after the battle. Machen, who had already written some factual articles on the conflict for the paper, set his story at the time of the retreat from the Battle of Mons in August 1914. The story described phantom bowmen from the Battle of Agincourt, summoned by a soldier calling on St. George, destroying a German host. Machen's story was not, however, labelled as fiction, and the same edition of The Evening News ran a story by a different author under the heading "Our Short Story". Machen's story was written from a first-hand perspective and was a kind of false document, a technique Machen knew well. The unintended result was that Machen had a number of requests to provide evidence for his sources for the story soon after its publication, from readers who thought it was true, to which he responded that it was completely imaginary, as he had no desire to create a hoax.

A month or two later Machen received requests from the editors of parish magazines to reprint the story, which were granted. In the introduction to The Bowmen and Other Legends of the War (1915), Machen relates that an unnamed priest, the editor of one of these magazines, subsequently wrote to him asking if he would allow the story to be reprinted in pamphlet form, and if he would write a short preface giving sources for the story. Machen replied that they were welcome to reprint but he could not give any sources for the story since he had none. The priest replied that Machen must be mistaken, that the "facts" of the story must be true, and that Machen had just elaborated on a true account. As Machen later said:

It seemed that my light fiction had been accepted by the congregation of this particular church as the solidest of facts; and it was then that it began to dawn on me that if I had failed in the art of letters, I had succeeded, unwittingly, in the art of deceit. This happened, I should think, some time in April, and the snowball of rumour that was then set rolling has been rolling ever since, growing bigger and bigger, till it is now swollen to a monstrous size.

— Arthur Machen, Introduction to The Bowmen and Other Legends of the War

Around that time variations of the story began to appear, told as authentic histories, including an account that told how the corpses of German soldiers had been found on the battlefield with arrow wounds.

In "The Bowmen", Machen's soldier saw "a long line of shapes, with a shining about them". A Mr. A. P. Sinnett, writing in The Occult Review, stated that "those who could see said they saw 'a row of shining beings' between the two armies". This led Machen to suggest that the bowmen of his story had become the Angels of Mons. This last point was challenged by Harold Begbie in his book: On the Side of the Angels: A Reply to Arthur Machen, London 1915.

Phyllis Campbell's 1915 memoir Back to the Front: Experiences of a Nurse includes tales of soldiers' visions of Joan of Arc and the archangel Michael which were told to her while serving as a nurse on the front in France. The construction of the book has led some literary scholars to describe it as a "parallel work" to Machen's "The Bowmen".

=== Angels ===
On 24 April 1915, an account was published in the British Spiritualist magazine telling of visions of a supernatural force that miraculously intervened to help the British at the decisive moment of the battle. This was rapidly followed by a flurry of similar accounts and the spread of wild rumours. Descriptions of this force varied from it being medieval longbow archers alongside St. George, to a strange luminous cloud, though eventually the dominant version came to be angelic warriors. Similar tales of such battlefield visions occurred in medieval and ancient warfare. Atrocity reports like the Rape of Belgium and that of the Crucified Soldier paved the way for a belief that the Christian God would intervene directly against such an evil enemy. However, there are strong similarities between many of these accounts of visions and Machen's story published six months earlier.

In May 1915, a full-blown controversy was erupting, with the angels being used as proof of the action of divine providence on the side of the Allies in sermons across Britain, and then spreading into newspaper reports published widely across the world. Machen, bemused by all this, attempted to end the rumours by republishing the story in August in book form, with a long preface stating the rumours were false and originated in his story. It became a best-seller, and resulted in a vast series of other publications claiming to provide evidence of the Angels' existence. Machen tried to set the record straight, but any attempt to lessen the impact of such an inspiring story was seen as bordering on treason by some. These new publications included popular songs and artists' renderings of the angels. There were more reports of angels and apparitions from the front including Joan of Arc.

Kevin McClure's study describes two types of accounts circulating: some more clearly based on Machen, others with different details. In a time of intense media interest all these reports allegedly confirming sightings of supernatural activity were second-hand and some of them were hoaxes created by soldiers who were not even at Mons. A careful investigation by the Society for Psychical Research in 1915 said of the first-hand testimony, "We have received none at all, and of testimony at second-hand we have none that would justify us in assuming the occurrence of any supernormal phenomenon." The SPR went on to say the stories relating to battlefield "visions" which circulated during the spring and summer of 1915, "prove on investigation to be founded on mere rumour, and cannot be traced to any authoritative source". Given that the Society for Psychical Research believed in the existence of supernatural forces, the conclusions of this report are highly significant.

The sudden spread of the rumours in the spring of 1915, six months after the events and Machen's story was published, is also puzzling. The stories published then often attribute their sources to anonymous British officers. The latest and most detailed examination of the Mons story by David Clarke suggests these men may have been part of a covert attempt by military intelligence to spread morale-boosting propaganda and disinformation. As it was a time of Allied problems with the Lusitania sinking, Zeppelin attacks and failure to achieve a breakthrough on the Western Front, the timing would make military sense. Some of the stories conveniently claimed that sources could not be revealed for security reasons.

The only real evidence of visions from actual named serving soldiers provided during the debate stated that they saw visions of phantom cavalrymen, not angels or bowmen, and this occurred during the retreat rather than at the battle itself. Furthermore, these visions did not intervene to attack or deter German forces, a crucial element in Machen's story and in the later tales of angels. Since during the retreat many troops were exhausted and had not slept properly for days, such visions could be hallucinations.

According to the conclusion of the most detailed study of the event it seems that Machen's story provided the genesis for the vast majority of the tales. The stories themselves certainly boosted morale on the home front, as popular enthusiasm was dying down in 1915 and they demonstrate the usefulness of religion in wartime.

== Post-war developments ==
After the war the story continued to be frequently repeated, but with little factual evidence to support it from eye-witnesses to the events at the Battle of Mons. The most substantial piece of corroboratory evidence that is known to exist comes from Brigadier-General John Charteris' memoir At G.H.Q. (published 1931), which implies that the story of an "Angel of the Lord, clad in white raiment bearing a flaming sword, appearing before the German forces at the Mons battle forbidding their advance" was a popular rumour circulating in September 1914 among the troops of the British Army's II Corps who had fought in the battle. However, General Charteris was not serving with II Corps in 1914, and was commenting on it therefore from a second-hand perspective, and an examination of his original war correspondence and notes from which his book's text was drawn makes no contemporary mention of the story at that time. It would appear likely that he retrospectively added it into the book's narrative when writing it post-war, acknowledging in the book's preface that he had 'amplified' the original source material in parts in such a way to supplement the text.

One example of the proliferation of material, which was particularly notable in religious circles, is the production in 1915 of a 160-line poem entitled "The Angels of Mons", by Dugald MacEchern. It is contained in his book The Sword of the North: Highland Memories of the Great War, published in 1923. MacEchern, who was the Minister of the Parish of Bower (Caithness) between 1908 and 1946, was The Bard to the Gaelic Society of Inverness. He was attached to the Seaforth Highlanders during the Great War. He had a very wide range of contacts, including David Lloyd George.

He supplied no original information about the legend of the Angels of Mons, but embellished it considerably – emphasizing that the heavenly hosts were actively engaged in the battle (on the side of the British), as well as supplying some details about their appearance. A short section of the poem is copied below:

Loose-flowing were their garments,
Their hair was burning gold—

Oh, they were fairer than the sun
So god-like was their mould!

We gazed! Were these the shining shapes
Of which the prophets tell?

We knew not: yet we felt we looked
On Michael and Gabriel.

And the central shining seemed the Christ
Whose wounds Heaven's gates unbar,

And 'neath his feet once pierced for us
There burned one golden star;

And in their hands were shining brands
That smote the tyrant's pride!

Christ and his holy angels
Were fighting on our side!

Machen was associated with the story for the rest of his life and grew sick of the connection, as he regarded "The Bowmen" as a poor piece of work. He made little money from the story then or later.

The sudden revival of interest in appearances of angels from the 1980s onwards, especially in the United States, not only among Christians, but those interested in the New Age, has caused uncritical accounts of the story of the angels who saved the British Army to be regularly published in books and magazines. Similarly, the story is also often used by skeptics as a good example of how believers in the supernatural can become convinced of fantastic things by slender evidence. References to the story can be found in novels and films like FairyTale: A True Story set during World War I. The Friends of Arthur Machen frequently publish articles on developments in the case.

=== William Doidge hoax ===
In 2001, an article in The Sunday Times claimed that a diary, film and photographic evidence proving the existence of the Angels of Mons from a World War I soldier named William Doidge had been found. The article discussed an involved story in which Doidge was involved with an American GI and an angel seen years later in Woodchester Mansion. It was claimed Marlon Brando and Tony Kaye were going to spend £350,000 to buy the evidence to make a film. Other papers like Variety and the Los Angeles Times and television programmes soon followed up the story and a website connected to the mystery became very popular. The footage was supposedly found in a trunk in an antique shop by Danny Sullivan in Monmouth, close to Machen's birthplace of Caerleon. In 2002, in a BBC Radio documentary; The Making of an Urban Myth, Sullivan admitted the story was a hoax created to drum up interest in Woodchester Mansion, and the film footage and soldier were fictional.

== See also ==
- Peter Rugg (another literary ghost story sometimes taken as an actual report)
- Cottingley Fairies
- Angel of Hadley
- Ghost of Kyiv, a fictitious pilot of the Ukrainian Air Force later described as a morale booster in the early days of the 2022 Russian invasion of Ukraine.
- Flechettes, arrow-shaped projectiles dropped from aeroplanes used in WW1, which may have seemed like arrows shot by phantom bowmen.
- One Step Beyond, "The Vision", four French soldiers in WWI see a bright light above the battle field and are overwhelmed with feelings of peace and serenity. They abandon their post and are put on trial for cowardice. After a guilty verdict they are sentenced to death but, are reprieved when an enemy soldier who shared the miracle vision arrives.

== Bibliography ==
Notes

References

- Begbie, Harold (1917). On the Side of the Angels: A Reply to Arthur Machen. Hodder and Stoughton. – Total pages: 120
- Clarke, David (2002). "Rumours of Angels: A Legend of the First World War". Folklore. 113 (2). The Folklore Society: 151–173. doi:10.1080/0015587022000015293. ISSN 1469-8315. S2CID 162245872.
- Clarke, David (May 2003). "Angels on the Battlefield". forteantimes. Archived from the original on 16 March 2008.
- Garth, John (2019). "Revenants and Angels: Tolkien, Machen, and Mons". In Croft, Janet Brennan; Röttinger, Annika (eds.). Something Has Gone Crack. Zurich: Walking Tree Publishers. ISBN 978-3-905703-41-2. OCLC 1121292764.
- Machen, Arthur (1915). The Angels of Mons: The Bowmen, and Other Legends of the War. G. P. Putnam's Sons. – Total pages: 99
- Randi, James (31 December 2006). "Angels of Mons". An Encyclopedia of Claims, Frauds and Hoaxes of the Occult and Supernatural. Archived from the original on 31 December 2006.
