= The Grain of Dust (1918 film) =

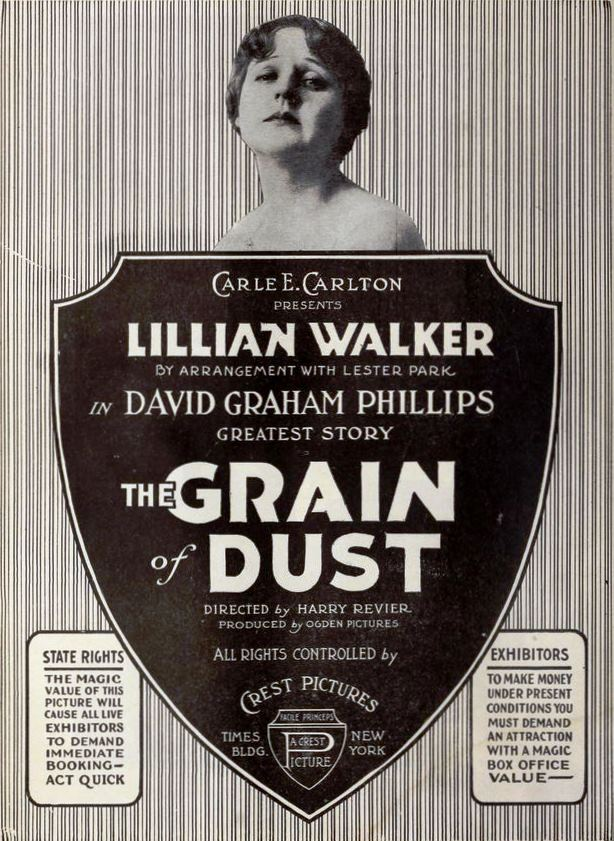
- Advertisement
- Directed by: Harry Revier
- Written by: Bess Meredyth
- Based on: novel by David Graham Phillips
- Starring: Lillian Walker
- Cinematography: Al Liguori; Joe Seiden
- Edited by: Carle E. Carlton
- Production company: Ogden Pictures Corporation
- Distributed by: State Rights; Crest Pictures Corp.
- Release date: February 1918
- Running time: 6 reels
- Country: United States
- Language: Silent (English intertitles)

The Grain of Dust is a lost 1918 American silent romance drama film directed by Harry Revier based on a novel by David Graham Phillips. The film starred Lillian Walker.

== Cast ==
- Lillian Walker as Dorothy Hallowell, the Grain of Dust
- Ramsey Wallace as Frederick Norman
- Ralph Delmore as James Galloway
- James O'Neill as William Tetlow
- Corinne Uzzell as Ursula Norman
- Edith Day as Josephine Burroughs
- Richard Wangerman as John Hallowell
- Jacques Tyrol as Prince Boris
- Cecil Fletcher as New Minister
- Elizabeth Ferris as Emily Howe
- George Henry
- Redfield Clark
- Marjorie Vonnegut
- Charles Eldridge
- Lawrence Evart
