= 1919 in British music =

This is a summary of 1919 in music in the United Kingdom.

== Events ==
- April – Poet Robert Graves, temporarily living in Wales, asks composer John Rippiner Heath to set some of his work to music.
- 7 April – The Original Dixieland Jazz Band arrives in the UK for a 15-month tour.
- 22 July – Manuel de Falla's ballet El sombrero de tres picos (The Three-Cornered Hat) receives its world premiere in London, performed by Ballets Russes.
- 19 August – The Southern Syncopated Orchestra, while touring the UK, performs for King Edward VII of the United Kingdom. Ernest Ansermet's review is considered one of the first serious pieces of jazz criticism.
- 27 October – Edward Elgar's Cello Concerto receives its première in London, performed by Felix Salmond. The concert goes ahead with inadequate rehearsal time, because of Albert Coates, who is conducting the rest of the programme.
- Elsie Griffin joins the D'Oyly Carte Opera Company.

== Popular music ==
- Fred W. Leigh & Charles Collins – "My Old Man (Said Follow the Van)"

== Classical music: new works ==
- Arnold Bax – Tintagel
- Rebecca Clarke – Viola Sonata
- Gustav Holst – Ode to Death
- Charles Villiers Stanford – A Song of Agincourt
- Ralph Vaughan Williams – Fantasia on a Theme by Thomas Tallis (revised version)

== Opera ==
- Rutland Boughton – The Moon Maiden
- Frederick Delius – Fennimore and Gerda

== Musical theatre ==
- 22 October – Maggie, with music by Marcel Lattès and lyrics by Adrian Ross, starring Winifred Barnes, opens at the Oxford Theatre, London, where it will run for 108 performances.

== Births ==
- 25 January – Norman Newell, record producer and lyricist (died 2004)
- 10 March – Margot Fonteyn, ballerina (died 1991)
- 13 August – George Shearing, jazz pianist and composer (died 2011)
- 15 August – Bernard Barrell, musician, music teacher and composer (died 2005)
- 4 September – Teddy Johnson, popular singer (died 2018)
- 2 October
  - John W. Duarte, writer, guitarist and composer (died 2004)
  - Sean 'ac Donncha, Irish traditional singer (died 1996)
- 11 November – Hamish Henderson, folk song collector (died 2002)
- 3 December – Charles Craig, operatic tenor (died 1997)

== Deaths ==
- 20 March – Pauline Markham, vaudeville actress, singer and dancer, 71
- 2 June – Ernest Ford, conductor and composer, 61
- 27 September – Adelina Patti, Italian-French opera singer resident in Wales, 76
- date unknown – Oliveria Prescott, writer and composer, 75/76

== See also ==
- 1919 in the United Kingdom
