= Indiscretion (1917 film) =

- Directed by: Wilfrid North
- Written by: William Addison Lathrop
- Produced by: Albert E. Smith
- Starring: Lillian Walker; Walter McGrail; Richard Wangermann
- Cinematography: Tom Malloy
- Production company: Vitagraph Company of America
- Distributed by: Greater Vitagraph
- Release date: January 15, 1917
- Running time: 50 minutes
- Country: United States
- Languages: Silent; English intertitles

Indiscretion is a 1917 American silent drama film directed by Wilfrid North and starring Lillian Walker, Walter McGrail and Richard Wangermann.

== Cast ==
- Lillian Walker as Penelope Holloway
- Walter McGrail as Jimmy Travers
- Richard Wangermann as Marcellus Holloway
- Mrs. West as Mrs. Travers
- Katharine Lewis as Margery Travers
- Thomas R. Mills as Reginald Rivers
- Josephine Earle as Mrs. Rivers
- Tom Brooke as Doctor McIntosh
- Robert Gaillard as Harrigan

== Bibliography ==
- Robert B. Connelly. The Silents: Silent Feature Films, 1910-36, Volume 40, Issue 2. December Press, 1998.
