= Harry Tierney =

American composer of musical theatre (1890-1965)

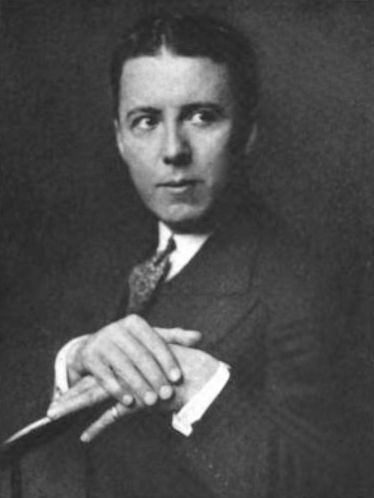
- Born: Harry Austin Tierney; May 21, 1890; Perth Amboy, New Jersey, US
- Died: March 22, 1965 (aged 74); New York, New York, US
- Burial place: Holy Sepulchre Cemetery
- Occupation: Composer

Harry Austin Tierney (May 21, 1890 – March 22, 1965) was an American composer of musical theatre, best known for long-running hits such as Irene (1919), Broadway's longest-running show of the era (620 performances), Kid Boots (1923) and Rio Rita (1927), one of the first musicals to be turned into a talking picture (and later remade starring Abbott and Costello).

== Life and career ==
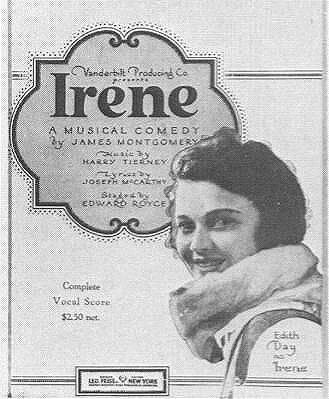
Sheet music for Irene

Born in Perth Amboy, New Jersey, United States, he was most active between about 1910 and 1930, often collaborating with the lyricist Joseph McCarthy. His mother was a pianist, his father a trumpeter, and he himself toured as a concert pianist in his early years. After a brief spell working in London for a music publisher, he returned to the United States in 1916. Over the next couple of decades many of his songs were used in the Ziegfeld Follies, and were performed by the premier singers of the day, such as Eddie Cantor, Anna Held and Edith Day.

The year 1919 saw his greatest Broadway hit, the show Irene, which contained perhaps his most well-known song, "Alice Blue Gown", as well as "Castle of Dreams", an adaptation of Chopin's Minute Waltz. This same show was made into a film in 1926, then remade in 1940 with Anna Neagle and Ray Milland, and again for the stage in 1973 with Debbie Reynolds. The original show broke the then record for the longest running show, at 620 performances.

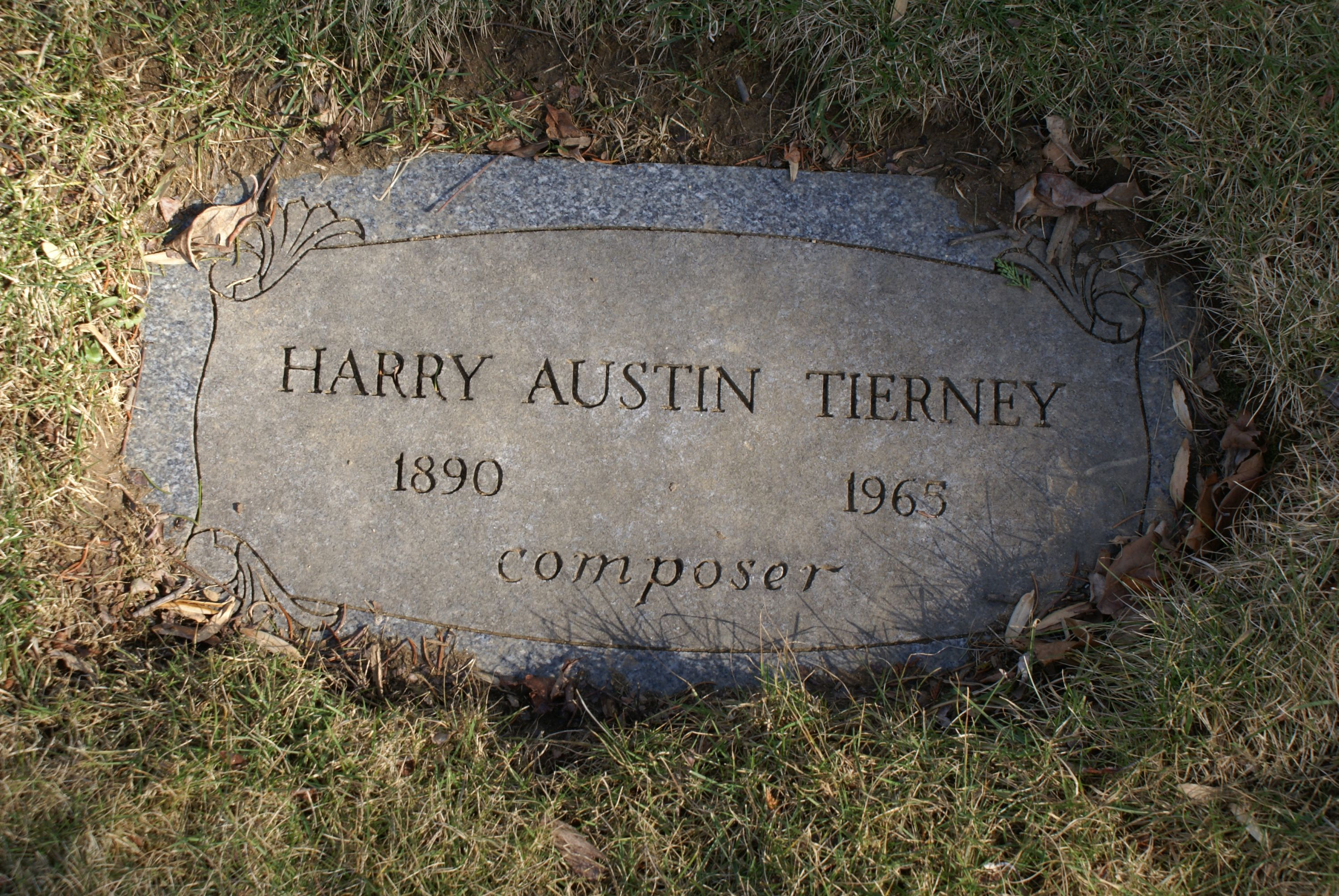
Harry Tierney's footstone

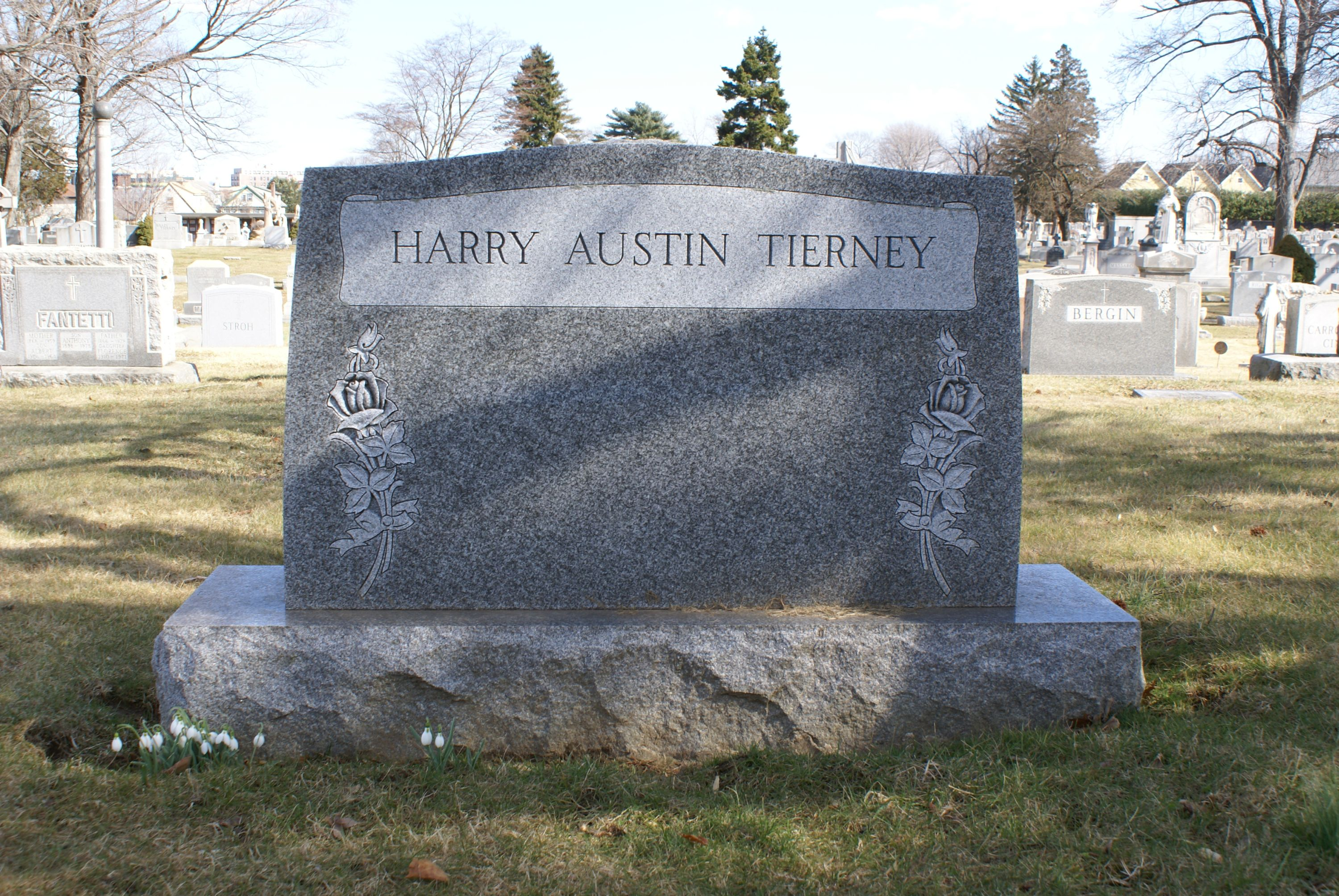
The grave of Harry Tierney

Other shows followed with varying success, in particular, Rio Rita (collaborating with Joseph McCarthy, and one of RKO's first forays in converting a musical to the silver screen), and Kid Boots, Dixiana (1929) and Half Shot at Sunrise (1930) were also made into films. Tierney's successes after this period were sketchy (apart from the film remakes of Irene), but he was elected into the Songwriter's Hall of Fame.

He died in March 1965, in New York, at the age of 74. Harry Tierney is interred at Holy Sepulchre Cemetery in New Rochelle, New York.

== Shows ==
- Keep Smiling (1913)
- Irene (1919) - including famous popular song "Alice Blue Gown"
- The Broadway Whirl (1921)
- Up she Goes (1922)
- Glory (1922)
- Kid Boots (1923)
- Rio Rita (1927)
- Cross My Heart (1928)
- Beau Brummell (1933)

== Ragtime compositions ==
Ragtime pieces composed by Tierney included:

- "The Bumble Bee" (1909)
- "The Fanatic Rag" (1911)
- "Uncle Tom's Cabin" (1911)
- "Dingle Pop Hop" (1911)
- "Black Canary" (1911)
- "Checkerboard" (1911)
- "Crimson Rambler" (1911)
- "William's Wedding" (1911)
- "Rubies and Pearls" (1911)
- "Fleur De Lys" (1911)
- "Innocence Rag" (1911)
- "Cabaret Rag"
- "Variety Rag" (1912)
- "Louisiana Rag" (1913)
- "Chicago Tickle" (1913)
- "1915 Rag" (1913)

== See also ==
- List of ragtime composers
