= The White Hen (film) =

1921 film

- Directed by: Frank Richardson
- Written by: Phyllis Campbell (novel)
- Produced by: Joseph Jay Bamberger
- Starring: Mary Glynne; Leslie Faber [Pat Somerset]] Cecil Humphreys
- Production company: Zodiac Films
- Distributed by: Walker Films
- Release date: January 1921
- Running time: 5,000 feet
- Country: United Kingdom
- Languages: Silent; English intertitles

The White Hen is a 1921 British silent comedy film directed by Frank Richardson and starring Mary Glynne, Leslie Faber and Pat Somerset. It was based on a novel by Phyllis Campbell.

== Cast ==
- Mary Glynne as Celeste de Crequy
- Leslie Faber as Duc de Crequy
- Pat Somerset as Beaufort Lynn
- Cecil Humphreys as Louis St. Romney

== Bibliography ==
- Low, Rachael. History of the British Film, 1918-1929. George Allen & Unwin, 1971.
