= Joseph McCarthy (lyricist) =

American lyricist (1885–1943)

- Born: September 27, 1885; Somerville, Massachusetts, U.S.
- Died: December 18, 1943 (aged 58)
- Occupation: Lyricist

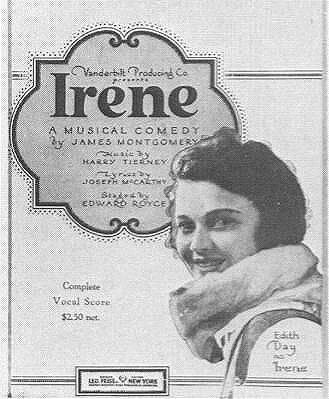
Sheet music for Irene

Thomas Joseph McCarthy (September 27, 1885 – December 18, 1943) was an American lyricist whose most famous songs include "You Made Me Love You", and "I'm Always Chasing Rainbows", from the now-forgotten Oh, Look! (1918), starring the Dolly Sisters, based upon the haunting melody from the middle section of Chopin's Fantaisie-Impromptu.

Born in Somerville, Massachusetts, United States, McCarthy was a frequent collaborator of composers Harry Tierney and Fred Fisher. He was the director of ASCAP from 1921 to 1929.

== Broadway and film credits ==
=== Music score ===
- 1918 Oh, Look!
- 1919 Ziegfeld Follies of 1919
- 1919 Irene (stage musical)
- 1920 Ziegfeld Follies of 1920
- 1921 The Broadway Whirl
- 1922 Up She Goes
- 1922 Glory
- 1923 Ziegfeld Follies of 1923
- 1923 Kid Boots
- 1924 Ziegfeld Follies of 1924
- 1926 Irene (film)
- 1927 Rio Rita (stage musical)
- 1928 Cross My Heart
- 1929 Rio Rita
- 1930 New Movietone Follies of 1930
- 1931 Ziegfeld Follies of 1931
- 1942 Rio Rita (remake)

=== Songwriter ===
- 1914 "There's a Little Spark of Love Still Burning" (with Fred Fisher)
- 1917 "They Go Wild Simply Wild Over Me" (with Fred Fisher)
- 1918 "I'm Always Chasing Rainbows" (from the musical Oh Look!)
- 1919 "Alice Blue Gown" (waltz from Irene) (with Harry Tierney)
- 1930 "So This Is London"
- 1930 "Under Suspicion"
- 1930 "Up the River"
- 1945 "Incendiary Blonde"
