= Irene (musical) =

Musical with a book by James Montgomery, Thomas Joseph McCarthy, and Harry Austin Tierney

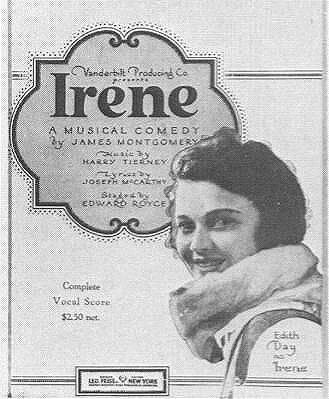
- Sheet music cover showing Edith Day
- Music: Harry Tierney
- Lyrics: Joseph McCarthy
- Book: James Montgomery; Joseph Stein
- Basis: Irene O'Dare by James Montgomery
- Productions: 1919 Broadway; 1923 Broadway revival 1973 Broadway revival

Irene is a musical with a book by James Montgomery, lyrics by Joseph McCarthy, and music by Harry Tierney. Based on Montgomery's play Irene O'Dare, it is set in New York City's Upper West Side and focuses on immigrant shop assistant Irene O'Dare, who is introduced to Long Island's high society when she is hired to tune a piano for a society gentleman.

The musical opened on Broadway in 1919 and ran for 675 performances, at the time the record for the longest-running musical in Broadway history, which it maintained for nearly two decades. It starred Edith Day in the title role, who repeated the role in the London production. It was revived on Broadway in 1923, filmed twice, and had a major Broadway revival in 1973, starring Debbie Reynolds, that ran for 594 performances, followed by a 1976 London run that lasted 974 performances.

== Early productions ==
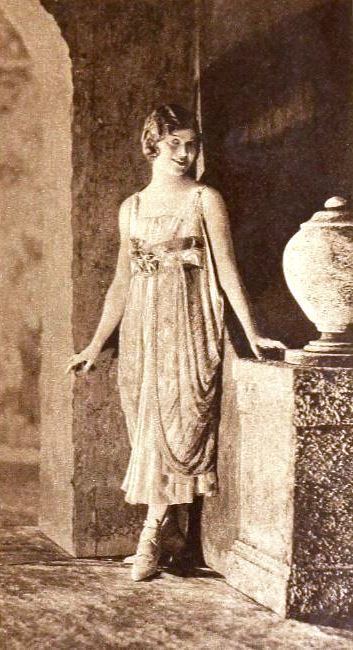
Edith Day in Irene (1919)

The original Broadway production, directed by Edward Royce, opened on November 18, 1919 at the Vanderbilt Theatre, where it ran for 675 performances, at the time the record for the longest-running show in Broadway history, one it maintained for nearly two decades. The cast included Edith Day as Irene, Walter Regan as tycoon Donald Marshall, Eva Puck as Helen Cheston, Gladys Miller as Jane Gilmour, and Bobby Watson as 'Madame Lucy', a flamboyant male dress designer. The show made a star of Day, who departed the cast after five months to recreate her role at London's Empire Theatre, where it ran for 399 performances. Bertha Belmore portrayed Helen Cheston in the London production. Day was replaced in the Broadway production by Helen Shipman and Irene Dunne, among others. Busby Berkeley played Madame Lucy on tour.

Irene enjoyed a brief Broadway revival at Jolson's 59th Street Theatre in 1923 with Dale Winter as Irene, Jere Delaney as Madame Lucy, and Walter Regan reprising his role as Donald. Eventually there were 17 national touring companies, and it was filmed twice, first as a 1926 silent movie with Colleen Moore and again in 1940 with Anna Neagle.

== Later productions ==
In 1971, the revival of the 1925 musical No, No, Nanette with film star Ruby Keeler proved to be a hit. Its producer, Harry Rigby, deciding to cash in on the nostalgia craze by reviving another vintage show with another glamorous movie star as its centerpiece, zeroed in on Irene, engaging Debbie Reynolds to make her Broadway debut in the title role. Rigby hired librettist Hugh Wheeler to rework the show, which retained only five of the original songs and added tunes written by McCarthy with other composers and original numbers by Charles Gaynor and Otis Clements, with additional material written by Wally Harper and Jack Lloyd for the revival. Actor John Gielgud was hired to direct.

The production was troubled from the beginning. Billy De Wolfe withdrew due to illness and was replaced by George S. Irving as Madame Lucy. Reviews in Toronto were mixed, and when Reynolds was stricken with a throat ailment, the producers, rather than cancel the sell-out performances, had her mime her dialogue and songs on stage to Gielgud's reading of them from the wings, much to the dismay of angry audiences. Philadelphia critics were brutal, and Gielgud, an odd choice for a lightweight musical comedy, was replaced by Gower Champion, who had helmed a Los Angeles revival of Annie Get Your Gun with Reynolds. Peter Gennaro was hired to restage the musical numbers, and Joseph Stein was brought in to doctor the book, which now had Irene posing as a countess in cahoots with couturier Madame Lucy (the former Liam O'Dougherty) in a scheme to promote his fashions. Postponing the Broadway opening, the producers brought the work-in-progress to Washington, D.C., where it was seen by President Nixon and his family. Their declaration that Irene was a hit made headlines and spurred advance-ticket sales in New York City.

After 13 previews, the revival opened on March 13, 1973 as the inaugural production of the Minskoff Theatre, where it set new box-office records. It ran for 594 performances. In addition to Reynolds and Irving (who won the Tony Award for his performance), the cast included Patsy Kelly, Monte Markham as Donald, Ruth Warrick, Janie Sell, Meg Bussert, and Reynolds' daughter Carrie Fisher. Raoul Pène Du Bois designed the sets and costumes, with the exception of Reynolds' costumes, which were by Irene Sharaff. The Broadway reviews were mixed, but Clive Barnes of The New York Times described it as "raucous, frequently cheerful, and the best 1919 musical in town." Reynolds and Kelly were each nominated for a Tony Award; Reynolds for Best Performance by a Leading Actress in a Musical and Kelly for Best Performance by a Featured Actress in a Musical. Reynolds' former MGM co-star, Jane Powell, replaced her in February 1974. New York Times reviewer Mel Gussow wrote that "even though Miss Reynolds is gone, Irene survives. The two stars are an equal match for peppiness. Miss Reynolds may score a point for clowning, but Miss Powell wins two for softness." "I'm Always Chasing Rainbows", which had been cut during the pre-Broadway try-outs (although Reynolds' rendition was included in the cast album), was restored to the score. Reynolds returned to play the final week before the revival closed on September 8, 1974, and then took the show on a national tour, playing for five months and setting new box-office records before being replaced again by Powell. The touring production also included Kelly Bishop as Helen McFudd. The success of this revival led to a 1973 Australian production with Julie Anthony, who then went on to star in a 1976 London revival at the Adelphi Theatre, directed by Freddie Carpenter and choreographed by Norman Maen, that lasted 974 performances. The cast also included Jon Pertwee and Eric Flynn. Additional changes were made in the song list.

== Synopsis (1973 version) ==
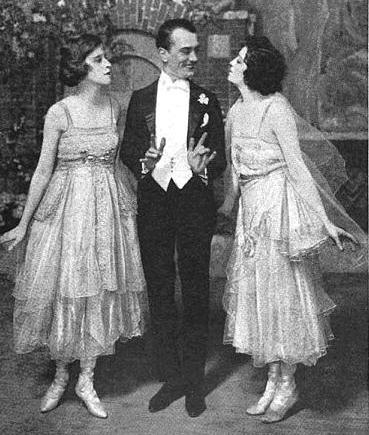
Gladys Miller, Bobby Watson, and Eva Puck in Irene, 1920

Act I

Irene O'Dare is a humble but ambitious, hard-working Irish girl from the West side of Manhattan, who runs a little music store with her widowed mother. Irene is sent to tune a piano for young tycoon Donald Marshall III, a Long Island society gentleman. Once at Donald's estate, Irene falls in love with him, and each is captivated by how different the other is from their usual friends.

Donald's ne'er-do-well cousin Ozzie wants help to jump-start a fashion business to be run by his friend, "Madame Lucy", a flamboyant male artiste, who pretends to be a famous French couturier. Irene and her pretty best friends, Helen McFudd and Jane Burke, are recruited to model Madame Lucy's gowns, and Donald provides financing. Irene agrees to pose as a society girl to convince everyone to shop at Madame Lucy's, but she becomes angry with Donald when he asks her to continue the ruse. Meanwhile, Irene's mother and Donald's mother do not see eye-to-eye.

Act II

Madame Lucy, Helen, Jane and Ozzie are overjoyed at their success, as Madame Lucy's creations are now world-famous. Donald realizes that he loves Irene. He goes to the piano store but on the way he runs into some unsavory fellows who beat him badly. He and Irene reconcile but then argue again, and he runs out. Helen and Jane give Donald some advice about acting like a man and wooing Irene properly. Following their counsel, he sweeps her into his arms and kisses her passionately, which results in more bruises, this time from her.

At the grand ball at Donald's estate, Irene finds her mother brokenhearted over Liam O'Dougherty, the love of her life. It turns out that Madame Lucy is Liam O'Dougherty, and he reunites happily with Irene's mother. Donald announces that he loves Irene, and her true identity is revealed. He tells her: "You made me love you", and all ends happily.

== Song list ==
=== Original production ===
Act I

- Hobbies – Eleanor Worth and Ensemble
- Alice Blue Gown – Irene O'Dare
- Castle of Dreams – Eleanor and Ensemble
- The Talk of the Town – Madame Lucy, Helen Cheston and Jane Gilmour
- To Be Worthy (of You) – Irene and Ensemble

Act II

- We're Getting Away with It – Madame Lucy, Donald Marshall, Robert Harrison, Helen and Jane
- Irene – Irene and Company
- To Love You – J. P. Bowden and Irene
- Sky Rocket (Skyrocket) – Irene and Ensemble
- The Last Part of Every Party – Helen, Jane and Ensemble
- There's Something in the Air – Ensemble

=== 1973 production ===
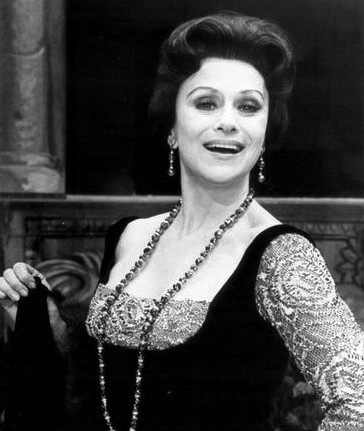
Ruth Warrick as Emmeline Marshall in the 1973 Broadway revival of Irene

Act I

- The World Must Be Bigger Than an Avenue – Irene (Lyrics by Jack Lloyd; music by Wally Harper)
- The Family Tree – Mrs. Marshall and Debutantes
- Alice Blue Gown – Irene
- They Go Wild, Simply Wild, Over Me – Lucy and Debutantes (Music by Fred Fisher)
- An Irish Girl – Irene and Company (Lyrics by Otis Clements; music by Charles Gaynor)
- Stepping on Butterflies – Lucy, Irene, Helen McFudd and Jane Gilmour (Music by Harper)
- Mother Angel Darling – Irene and Mrs. O'Dare (Music and lyrics by Gaynor)
- The Riviera Rage – Irene and Company (Music by Harper)

Act II

- I'm Always Chasing Rainbows – Irene
- The Last Part of Every Party – Company
- We're Getting Away with It – Lucy, Helen, Jane and Ozzie Babson
- Irene – Irene and Company
- The Great Lover Tango – Donald Marshall, Helen and Jane (Lyrics by Gaynor; music by Clements)
- You Made Me Love You – Irene and Donald (Music by James Monaco)
- You Made Me Love You (reprise) – Lucy and Mrs. O'Dare
- Finale – Company

== Awards and nominations ==
1973 Broadway revival

- Tony Award for Best Performance by a Leading Actress in a Musical (Reynolds, nominee)
- Tony Award for Best Performance by a Featured Actor in a Musical (Irving, winner)
- Tony Award for Best Performance by a Featured Actress in a Musical (Kelly, nominee)
- Tony Award for Best Choreography (nominee)
- Theatre World Award (Markham, winner)
- Outer Critics Circle Award for Outstanding Performance (Reynolds, winner)

== Adaptations ==
Irene was adapted for a 1926 silent film starring Colleen Moore, a June 1936 Lux Radio Theatre production with Jeanette MacDonald and Regis Toomey, and a 1940 film remake starring Anna Neagle and Ray Milland.
