= Sipping Cider Through a Straw =

Song

Song
- Published: 1894
- Genre: American folk; minstrel
- Songwriter(s): Possibly W. Freear

"Sipping Cider Through a Straw" is a folk song of uncertain origin. A minstrel song titled "Sucking Cider Thro' a Straw", with words and music attributed to W. Freear, was published in 1894 by White-Smith in the United States; this composition may be the origin of the folk song, or may owe its own origin to the folk song.

W. Freear was a comic performer with Moore & Burgess's Minstrels in the late 19th century. His song "Suckin' Cider Thro' a Straw" was published in Great Britain by Charles Sheard & Co., and Sheard also held the U.S. copyright. It was noted in waltz time in the key of F. The first line is "The funniest girl that I ever saw, Was sucking cider thro' a straw". The lyrics go on to describe how a man ends up married because of sucking cider through a straw with a girl; the White-Smith sheet music advertised it as "drolly delivered to shrieks of laughter".

In The American Songbag (1927), Sandburg's sources reported "Sipping Cider" as a folk song, heard in Pickens County, Georgia by one and Taylorville, Illinois by the other.

"Sipping Cider Through a Straw", in numerous variations, has been part of the repertory at American summer camps for many years.
