= Natalia Clare =

American ballet dancer and instructor (1919–2007)

Natalia Clare (September 3, 1919 – April 8, 2007) was an American ballet dancer and instructor who performed (sometimes as Natalia Conlon) with Ballets Russes and opened her own Los Angeles studio in 1956.

Clare was born in Los Angeles to reporter Paul H. Conlon and Lilian Mettler. She studied under Bronislava Nijinska and debuted at the Hollywood Bowl in 1940. She was recruited to Ballets Russes in 1942. In 1947 she joined the Markova-Dolin Ballet, but joined the Ballet Russe de Monte Carlo the following season and toured with them until 1952.

In 1956 she opened her own Los Angeles studio which formed the core of her Ballet la Jeunesse troupe founded in 1958.

Clare died of complications of a stroke in Redondo Beach, California.
