= I'm Going Back To Yarrawonga =

I'm going back to Yarrawonga originally titled Yarrawonga is a jaunty topical song that describes an Australians elation at returning home, written by Corporal Neil MacBeath AIF during a tour of France in World War One. The song was recorded by several artists including Leonard Hubbard, George Trevare Dance Orchestra and Slim Dusty in 2006.

== Origin ==
Neil McBeath (1893-1980) was Born in Campbell's Creek, Victoria to mother Jane (née McInnis/McInnes born abt 1852, died 9 May 1938, married 1873 registration number 4420), and father Robert McBeath. Neil started by performing the songs of Scottish comedian Harry Lauder He was known as the Harry Lauder of Castlemaine Neil McBeath received pronounced encores for comical songs in Mount Alexander, Victoria and bought down the house In 1914 McBeath was fined for a cycling traffic conviction.

Neil McBeath enlisted (Service number 74 with 7th Australian Field Artillery Brigade February 1916 or possibly a private with the 3rd Pioneer Battalion listed as Presbyterian Draughtsman). He wrote 'Yarrawonga' while serving in France First publication estimated circa 1919 following demobilization. By 1922 the song had big sales Indeed, 'Yarrawonga' bought him instant fame in his homeland and this notoriety remained until the forties.

He resisted selling the copyright to the song that launched his career. McBeath continued performing comic songs between the wars. He appeared as the comic entertainer the 'Digger Scot' at the London Oswald Theatre. and at a theatre in Footscray, and he managed a show at Sydney Majestic Theatre.

In 1941 McBeath wrote recruiting song "One for all, All for one". By 1942 the earlier song 'Yarrawonga' was universally known The song became regarded by Australians as a matter of civic pride.

In 1930 McBeath had a daughter with Singer Emmeline Mitchell also named Emmeline McBeath, a psychology student, she was also musically inclined. Emmeline Junior had no known children and there were still no claimants to the copyright in 2001 and 2003 In 2021 The only acknowledgement by the Australian War Memorial is a copy of another of other sheet music, without acknowledging the honorific 'private' or 'coroporal'. not referenced to his identity. The Returned Services League have forgotten his accomplishments altogether.

== Other works ==
- 1917 'My Bushland home in Australia'. Based on a traditional Scottish tune
- 1920'Jean from Coterstein'
- 1920 'When You're back in your Civvies again'
- 1921 'When you're back in your home once more'
- 1922 Bella Vista
- 1924 'Waratah' orchestarted for bands at the British Empire Exhibition

== Performances ==
- 1922 Adelaide, South Australia
- 1923 Dungog, NSW
- 1923 Esperance Western Australia
- 1925 Newcastle Brass Band
- 1925 Mount Magnet, Western Australia
- 1925 Geelong Jazz style
- 1922 Hurstbridge Victoria
- 1929 Albany Western Australia
- 1942 radio 2db
- 1954 radio 3XY Melbourne
