= Rio Rita (musical) =

1927 stage musical

- Music: Harry Tierney
- Lyrics: Joseph McCarthy
- Book: Guy Bolton and Fred Thompson
- Productions: 1927 Broadway; 1928 Sydney; 1930 West End

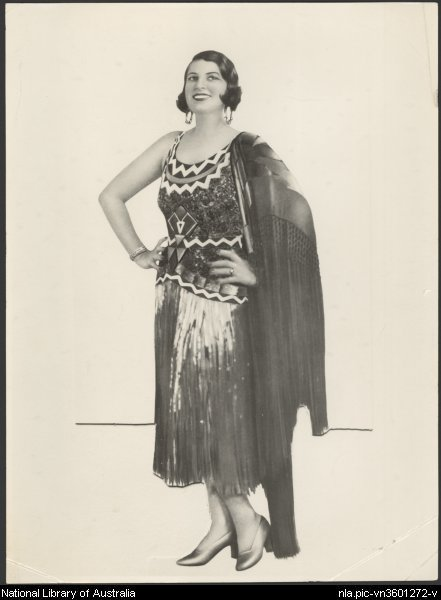
Gladys Moncrieff wearing the Montezuma dress used in Rio Rita, St. James Theatre, Sydney, 1928

Rio Rita is a 1927 American stage musical with a book by Guy Bolton and Fred Thompson, music by Harry Tierney, lyrics by Joseph McCarthy, and produced by Florenz Ziegfeld. This musical united Bert Wheeler and Robert Woolsey as a comedy team and made them famous.

It premiered on Broadway on February 2, 1927, at the new Ziegfeld Theatre and, after moving to the Lyric Theatre and Majestic Theatre, closed on April 7, 1928 after 494 performances, a very long run for its time. In Sydney, Gladys Moncrieff appeared in a successful production at the St James Theatre. The musical premiered in London's West End on April 3, 1930, at the then newly opened Prince Edward Theatre.

The musical was made into a film in 1929, Rio Rita, starring Bebe Daniels and John Boles along with the team of Wheeler & Woolsey. Based on the success of this film, Wheeler & Woolsey were also given contracts to star in a series of comedies. Another film based on the musical, starring Abbott & Costello was made in 1942.

== Background ==
Rio Rita may be said to be one of the last, great, "light musical comedies" or "Follies-based" type of musical. With the introduction of Show Boat, later in 1927—as well as the subsequent introduction of George Gershwin's musicals that year and through the early 1930s—the American musical became much more a dramatically cohesive "musical play". This form reached its maturity in the Rodgers and Hammerstein productions, beginning with Oklahoma! and culminating with South Pacific.

== Synopsis ==
Setting: Mexico and Texas

The captain of the Texas Rangers, Jim Stewart, is in San Lucar Mexico on the Rio Grande, in disguise in order to catch the notorious bandit Kinkajou. While there, he falls in love with Rita Ferguson, an Irish-American-Mexican girl who sings in the local hotel after being displaced, along with her brother, from her family ranch.

General Esteban, the Governor of the San Lucar District, also loves Rita and hates all gringos. He hatches a plot to set Jim and Rita at odds by making Rita doubt both her own brother, who may be the Kinkajou, and Jim, who may be spying on her brother through her.

Amid all of this intrigue, Chick Bean, a soap salesman, and Dolly, an American cabaret girl, arrive in San Lucar and get married. Unbeknownst to Dolly, Chick also went to Mexico to obtain a quick divorce from his unfaithful first wife, Katie. But then hours after Chick and Dolly are wed, Ed Lovett, a lawyer of dubious reputation, informs Chick that his divorce is not recognized by the U.S. Government. Complications ensue.

== Original Broadway cast ==
- Rita Ferguson – Ethelind Terry
- Captain Jim Stewart – J. Harold Murray
- Ed Lovett – Robert Woolsey
- Chick Bean – Bert Wheeler
- General Esteban – Vincent Serrano
- Dolly Bean – Ada-May
- Roberto Ferguson – Walter Petrie
- Carmen – Helen C. Clive
- Katie Bean – Noel Francis
- Montezuma's Daughter – Katherine Burke
- Reporter – Al Clair
- Sergeant Wilkins – Donald Douglas

The ensemble included Naomi Johnson as one of The Gringitas (the Cabaret Girls).

== Songs ==
Act I

- Overture
- Opening Chorus ("The world loves a lover, they say")
- The Best Little Lover in Town – Lovett, chorus of girls
- Sweetheart – Rita, chorus of girls
- River Song ("Down By the River of My Dreams") – Rita
- Eight Little Gringos – gringo girls
- Are You There? – Dolly, Chick
- Rio Rita – Rita, Jim
- Rangers' Chorus – rangers
- March of the Rangers – Jim, rangers
- Spanish Shawl ("Beneath the Silken Shawl") – Carmen, serenaders
- The Kinkajou – chorus
- You're Always in My Arms" – Rita
- If You're in Love, You'll Waltz – Rita, Jim
- Moonlight ballet
- Out on the Loose – Chick, girls
- Finale, Act 1

Act II

- Opening dance
- Yo Ho and a Bottle of Rum – girls
- The Black and White Ballet – girls
- Come, Take a Trip – chorus
- I Can Speak Espagnol – Dolly, Lovett
- Roses – Jim, Rita
- Following the Sun Around – Jim
- You're Always in My Arms (reprise) – Rita
- The Best Little Lover in Town (reprise) – Lovett
- Rio Rita (reprise) – Jim
- Incidental music
- Following the Sun Around (reprise) – katie
- Finale, Act 2 – ensemble

== Notes ==
It was this musical that Charles Lindbergh was attending when he got news from the Weather Bureau that clear skies were opening over the Atlantic Ocean. Lindbergh then hurried to his hotel room, but could not sleep, and then to the Roosevelt airfield to take off on his famous flight to Paris in the Spirit of St. Louis.

== Adaptation ==
A televised adaptation of Rio Rita was presented on Musical Comedy Time on NBC on November 13, 1950, starring Bert Wheeler, Patricia Morison, and Hal LeRoy.
