= The Occult Review =

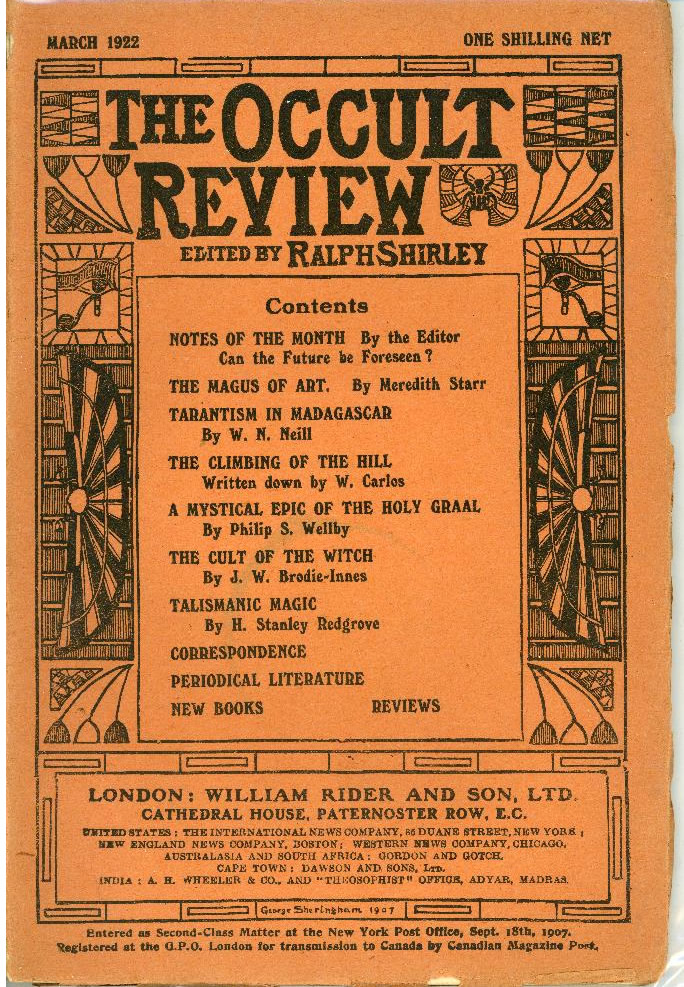
- Type: Journal
- Format: Monthly
- Owner(s): Ralph Shirley
- Publisher: Rider & Co.
- Editor: Ralph Shirley
- Founded: 1905
- Language: English
- Ceased publication: 1951
- Headquarters: London, UK

The Occult Review was a British illustrated monthly magazine published between 1905 and 1951 containing articles and correspondence by many notable occultists and authors of the day, including Aleister Crowley, Meredith Starr, Walter Leslie Wilmshurst, Arthur Edward Waite, Franz Hartmann, Florence Farr, Phyllis Campbell, and Paul Brunton. Edited by Ralph Shirley and published in London by William Rider and Son, Ltd. (later Rider & Company), it is said to have been devoted to the investigation of supernormal phenomena and the study of psychological problems. It was published under different names from 1905 to 1951. From September 1933 to October 1935 it was published as The London Forum. In January 1936 it reverted to The Occult Review.
