= Edith Day =

American actress and singer (1896–1971)

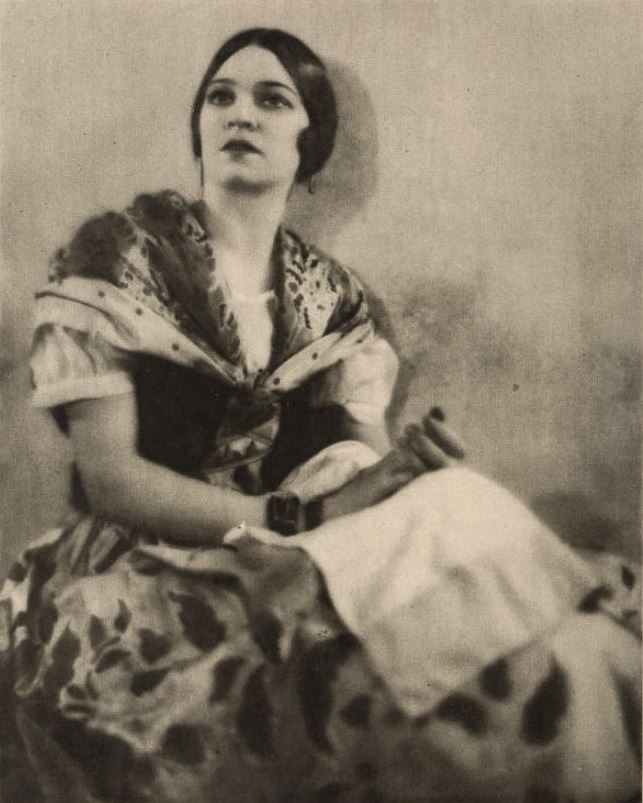
- Day in 1923
- Born: Edith Marie Day; April 10, 1896; Minneapolis, Minnesota, U.S.
- Died: May 1, 1971 (aged 75); London, England, U.K.
- Occupations: Actress, singer
- Years active: 1916–1962
- Spouses: Carle E. Carleton (m. 1919; div. 1922) Pat Somerset (m. 1923; div. 1927): Henry Horne
- Children: One son by 2nd husband

Edith Day (born Edith Marie Day; April 10, 1896 – May 1, 1971) was an American actress and singer best known for her roles in Edwardian musical comedies and operettas, first on Broadway and then in London's West End.

== Life and career ==
Born in Minneapolis, Minnesota as Edith Marie Day, Day made her Broadway debut in Pom-pom in 1916, then Follow Me the same year. At the end of 1917, she starred in the musical comedy Going Up. The show ran for 351 performances. Day then appeared in three silent films, The Grain of Dust (1918), A Romance of the Air (1918), and Children Not Wanted (1920).

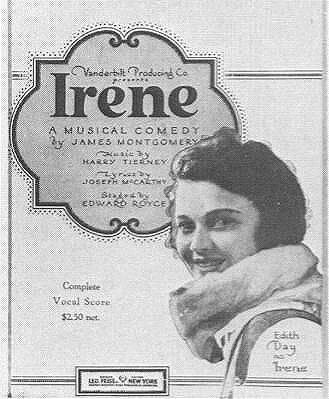
Day on the cover of sheet music for Irene

In 1919, she became a major star playing the title role in Irene on Broadway. Five months into the run, she was sent to create the role in the London production at the Empire Theatre, where she was embraced by the London critics. She next performed in two Broadway shows, Orange Blossoms (1922) and Wildflower (1923). She decided to return to London, where she had made such a success in Irene and went on to become the first lady of West End musicals, starring in such successes there as Rose-Marie (1925; 581 performances at the Theatre Royal, Drury Lane), The Desert Song (1927; 432 performances), Show Boat (1928; 350 performances), and Rio Rita (1930). In 1920, she recorded "Alice Blue Gown", the hit song from Irene, and she subsequently recorded excerpts from several of her shows.

Aside from acting in the theatre, Day broadcast on many occasions and appeared at variety theatres. She retired from acting in the early 1940s; her last stage appearance was in Sunny River (1943). In 1960, she briefly returned to the stage in Noël Coward's Waiting in the Wings, later appearing in the London production of Coward's musical Sail Away at the Savoy Theatre in 1962 (she is featured on the cast album).

== Personal life ==
Day married three times, first to theatre producer Carle Carleton in 1919; they divorced in 1922. The next year she married her second husband, actor Pat Somerset, with whom she had appeared onstage in London in Irene; they divorced in 1927. Her third husband was Henry Horne, who predeceased her. Her only son (by Somerset) died in World War II.

She died in London at the age of 75. Anna Neagle give a reading at her memorial service held at St Paul's, Covent Garden.

== Legacy ==
A cocktail is named for her, made with dry gin, grapefruit juice, sugar, and an egg white.

== Gallery ==
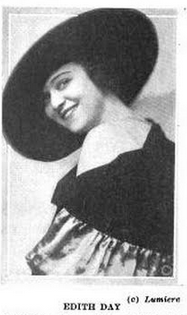
Edith Day, 1918
