= Grönnens Laid =

Song, anthem of Groningen, Netherlands

Grönnens laid
- Provincial anthem of Groningen
- Lyrics: Geert Teis Pzn.
- Music: G.R. Jager

Audio sample
- Grönnens Laid (a capella): file; help

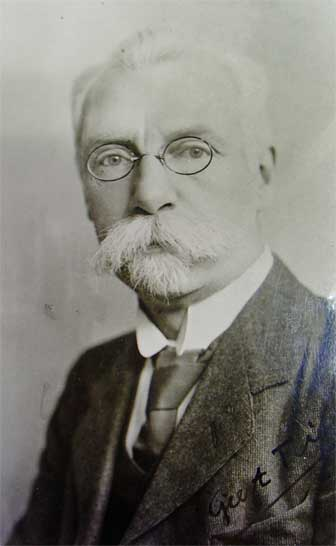
Geert Teis in c. 1920

The "Grönnens laid" (English: Song of Groningen) is the anthem of the Groningen province of the Netherlands. The anthem was written in 1919 by Geert Teis Pzn. of Stadskanaal, composed by G.R. Jager of Slochteren and arranged by Frieso Molenaar. It is the only Dutch provincial anthem that is officially written in a local dialect, in this case Gronings.

== Lyrics ==
Grönnens laid
Original lyrics	English translation
Van Lauwerzee tot Dollard tou Van Drente tot aan 't Wad, Daor gruit, daor bluit 'n wonderlaand, Rondom ain wondre stad: *) Ain Pronkjewail in gaolden raand Is Grönnen: Stad en Ommelaand. Daor broest de zee, daor hoelt de wind Daor soest 't aan diek en wad, Maor rusteg waarkt en wuilt het volk Het volk van loug en stad. Ain Pronkjewail in gaolden raand Is Grönnen: Stad en Ommelaand. Daor woont de dege degelkhaaid De wille, vast as staol, Daor vuilt het haart, wat tonge sprekt In richt- en slichte taol. Ain Pronkjewail in gaolden raand Is Grönnen: Stad en Ommelaand. *) Wordt gezongen: Rondom, rondom, ain wondre stad. Zo ook in de andere strofen.	From the Lauwers Sea to the Dollart, From Drenthe to the Wadden Sea, A wondrous land grows and flourishes Around a wondrous city. A jewel with a golden edge Is Groningen, City and Countryside; A jewel with a golden edge Is City and Countryside! That is where the sea foams, that is where the wind howls, Of swishing along dyke and wad, But the people calmly work and plough, The people of Village and City. A jewel with a golden edge Is Groningen, City and Countryside; A jewel with a golden edge Is City and Countryside! That is where the sober virtue lives, The will, steadfast like steel That is where the heart feels what the tongue says, In straightforward and sharp language. A jewel with a golden edge Is Groningen, City and Countryside; A jewel with a golden edge Is City and Countryside!
