= Ferdinand Thieriot =

German composer of Romantic music and cellist

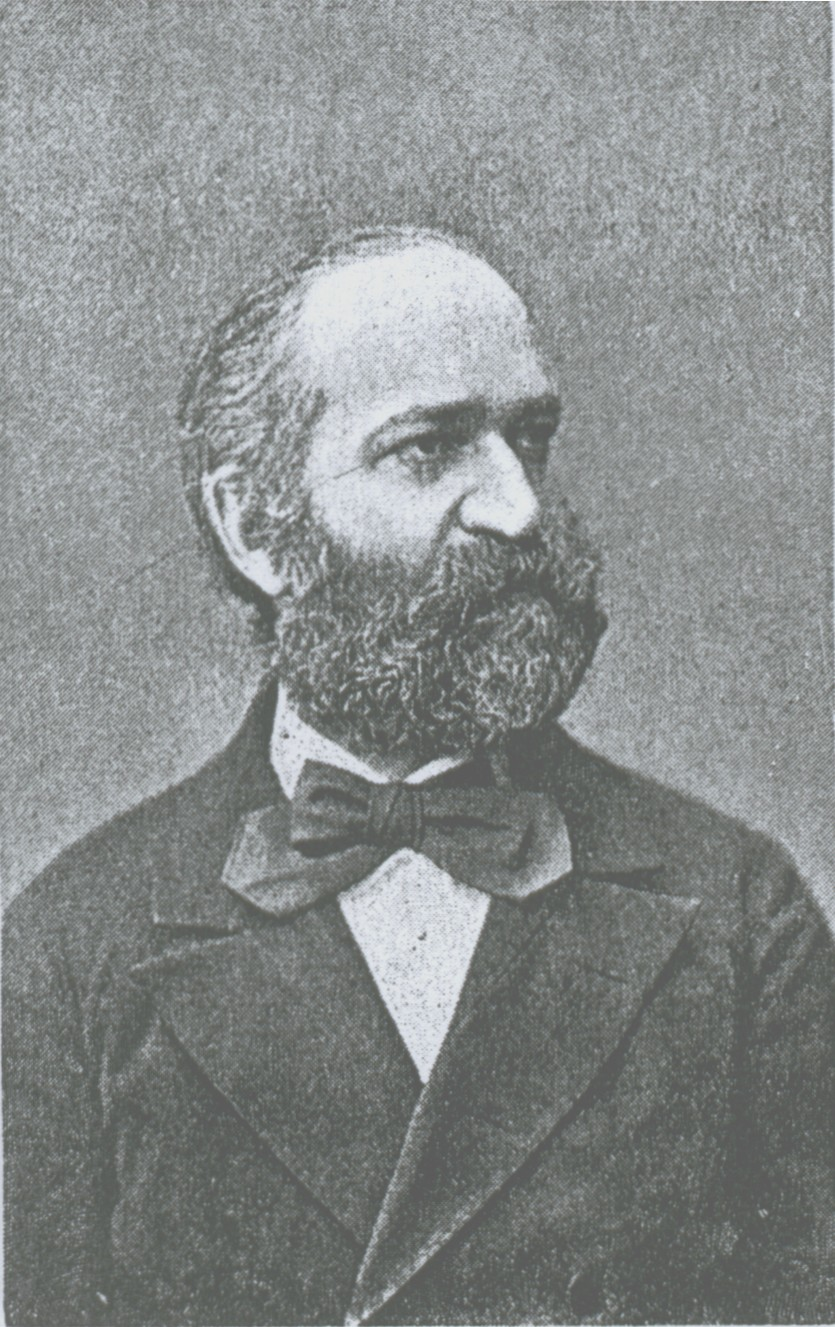
Ferdinand Thieriot.

Ferdinand Thieriot (English: /ˈtiːrjoʊ/ TEER-yoh, German: [ˈtiːʁjoː]; April 7, 1838 – July 31, 1919) was a German composer of Romantic music and a cellist.

== Life and career ==
Thieriot was born in Hamburg. He was a pupil of Eduard Marxsen in Altona and belonged to the circle of musicians around Johannes Brahms, who was also a pupil of Marxsen. Later, Thieriot was a pupil of Josef Rheinberger in Munich. A close, friendly relationship connected him with his teachers all his life. Thieriot was married to the Else Berens, the daughter of publisher Ernst Berens of Hamburg. The marriage remained childless.

He worked as a music teacher and musical director in Hamburg, Ansbach, Leipzig (1867) and Glogau (1868–1870). Later Brahms recommended Thieriot for the position of Artistic Director of the Styrian Music Association in Graz (1870–1885).

The composer always received high praise in concert reviews: "[…] and met with a warm and friendly reception by the audience and deservedly so. […] Excellent work, clarity and good taste regarding the instrumentation; employment of dignified motives full of character […] Enrichment of the concert repertoire".

There were performances of his works in concerts at the Hamburg Philharmonic and Singing Academy as well as in Leipzig, where he obtained a post in 1897 at the Directorium of the Bach Gesellschaft in Leipzig. From March 1902 onwards Thieriot had his home again in Hamburg where he lived until his death.

== Music ==
Thieriot was prolific throughout his life, and produced at least five symphonies and many concertos. But his chamber music, which constitutes a great part of his total output, is judged to be among his finest work. An archive of his manuscripts, which ended up in St Petersburg after World War II, was rediscovered in 1983, returned to Hamburg and restored.

He is known to have composed: four piano trios, Opp. 14, 45, 47 & 90; 13 string quartets, only two of which have been published; two Octets (Op. 78 for 4 violins, 2 violas and 2 cellos and Op. 62 for 2 violins, viola, cello, bass, clarinet, horn, and bassoon); a quartet for flute and string trio Op. 84; a quintet for piano and winds Op. 80; a quintet for piano and string quartet Op. 20; and several instrumental sonatas. In addition to the above, several unpublished compositions remain in manuscript awaiting publication. Toccata Classics has issued four CDs of his chamber works.

Wilhelm Altmann, one of the most influential and perceptive chamber music critics of all time, writing of Thieriot's chamber music, states: "Thieriot's chamber music is without exception noble and pure. He writes with perfect command of form and expression."

=== Selected works ===
- Adagios for viola or cello and organ, op. 41 (1887)
- Cello Concerto No.1 in F major, op. 97 (1915) (four in total)
- Four Fantasy Pieces for violin and piano, op. 28 (1875)
- Larghetto for viola and organ
- Octet for winds and strings in B♭ major, op. 62 (1893)
- Organ Concerto in D major
- Organ Concerto in F major
- Piano Concerto No. 1 in B♭ major
- Piano Concerto No. 2 in C minor
- Piano Quartet No. 3 in G minor (1905)
- Piano Quartet No. 4 in F major (1913)
- Piano Quintet in D major, op. 20 (pub. 1869, 1894)
- Quartet in G minor
- Quartet in B♭ major
- Quartet in C minor
- Quintet in G major for Two Violins, Viola and Two Cellos (1914)
- Requiem, op. 52
- Serenade for strings, op. 44 (1885)
- Sextet for strings in D major
- Sinfonietta for orchestra, op. 55 (1892)
- Suite, for three cellos
- Symphony No. 3 in C minor (performed about 1903)
- Symphony No. 5 in C♯ minor (premiered 1908, published 2014)
- Theme and Variations, op. 29, for two cellos and piano (1883)
- Violin Concerto in A major, op. 68 (1897)
