= Pat Somerset =

English stage and film actor

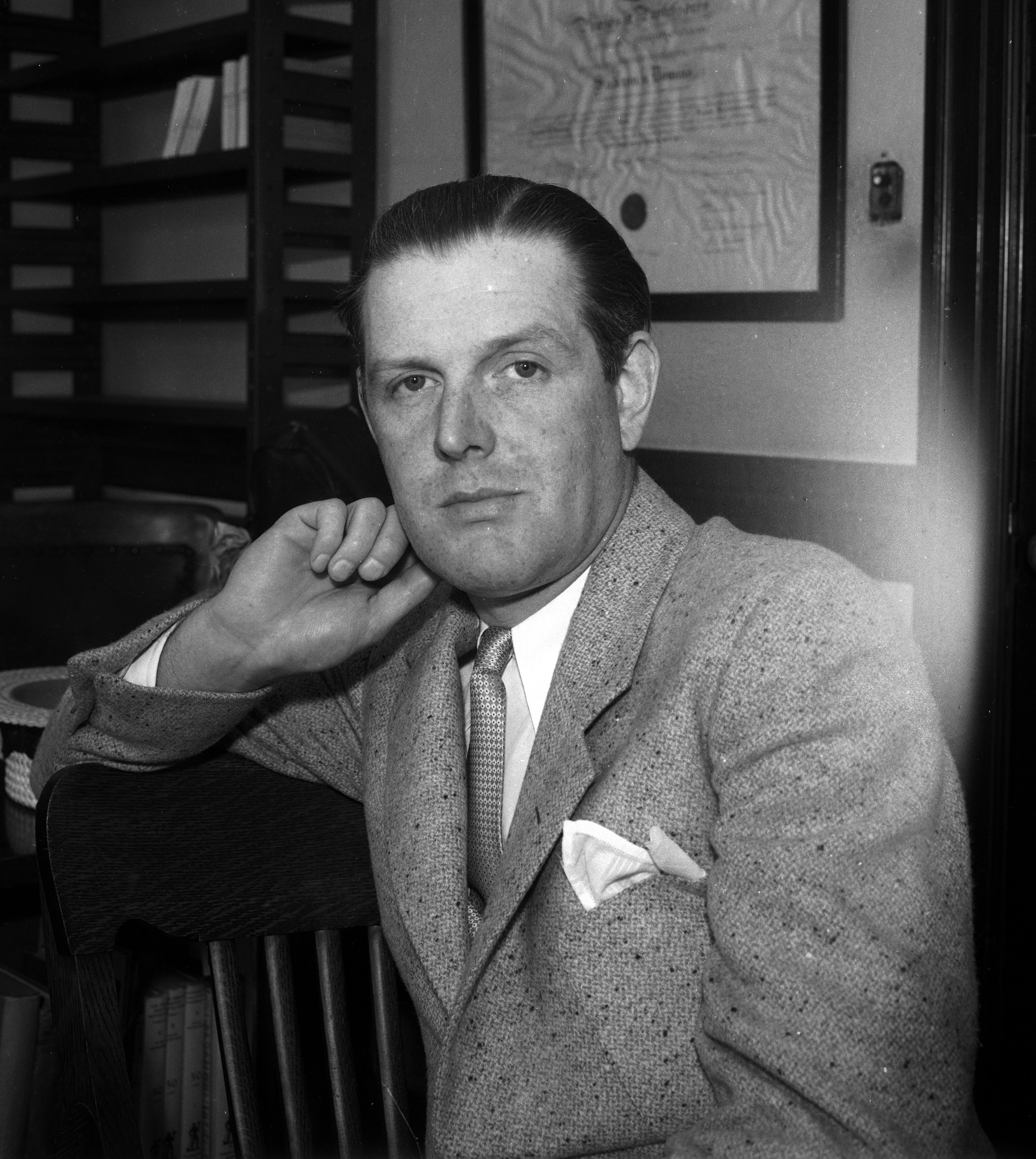
- Somerset in 1928
- Born: Patrick Holme-Sumner; 28 February 1897; London, United Kingdom
- Died: 20 April 1974 (aged 77); Apple Valley, California, United States
- Occupation: Actor
- Years active: 1918–1930 (film)
- Spouse(s): Edith Day (m. 1923; div. 1927) Margaret Bannerman (divorced)

Pat Somerset (28 February 1897 – 20 April 1974) was an English stage and film actor.

== Biography ==
Born Patrick Holme-Sumner, after appearing in some British silent films early in his career, he moved to the United States.

In 1922 he starred on Broadway as Lawyer Brassac in Victor Herbert's musical Orange Blossoms. Other Broadway roles were Evan Carruthers in The Dancers (1923) and Basil Owen in The Outsider (1924). Somerset established himself in Hollywood, but was restricted to supporting roles and bit parts in numerous films during the 1920s and 1930s. He was a regular of the John Ford Stock Company, appearing in nine of the director's films.

He was married to the actresses Edith Day and Margaret Bannerman.

== Selected filmography ==
- The Key of the World (1918)
- Walls of Prejudice (1920)
- The White Hen (1921)
- One of the Bravest (1925)
- Paris (1926)
- The Black Watch (1929)
- From Headquarters (1929)
- Good Intentions (1930)
- Hell's Angels (1930)
- Born Reckless (1930)
- Body and Soul (1931)
- Christopher Strong (1933)
- Murder in Trinidad (1934)
- The Key (1934)
- The Gilded Lily (1935)
- Mary of Scotland (1936)
- Wee Willie Winkie (1937)
- I Cover the War! (1937)
- Death in the Air (1937)
- Parnell (1937)

== Bibliography ==
- Dan Dietz. The Complete Book of 1920s Broadway Musicals. Rowman & Littlefield, 2019.
