= Alice Blue Gown =

Popular 1919 song from the musical Irene

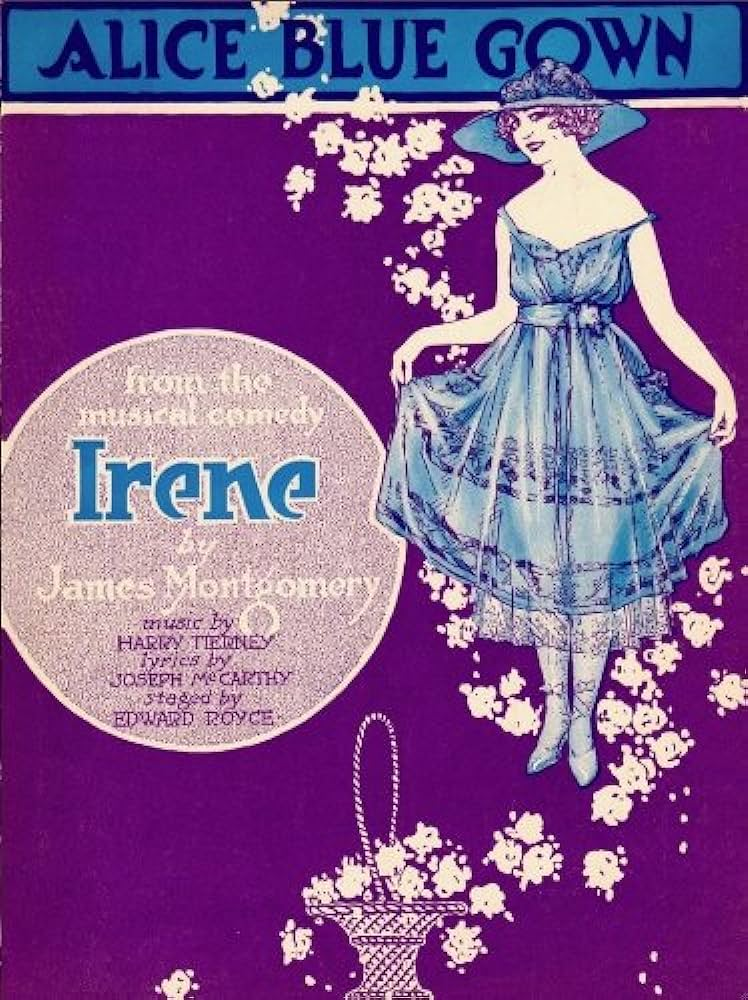
Sheet music cover, 1919

"Alice Blue Gown" is a popular song written by Joseph McCarthy and Harry Tierney. The song, which was inspired by Alice Roosevelt Longworth's signature gown, was first performed by Edith Day in the 1919 Broadway musical Irene. In 1920 the song was recorded and released.

Artists who have recorded the song include Duke Ellington, Kate & Anna McGarrigle with Lily Lanken & Rufus Wainwright, Glenn Miller, Wayne King, Frank Sinatra, Chet Atkins, and Lenny Breau. Carol Burnett sang the song as a spoof while wearing a fatsuit for the opening number of the March 29, 1975 episode of her eponymous variety show. Liza Minnelli, daughter of Judy Garland, sang it on her mother's Christmas show in December 1963. Variety included 'Alice Blue Gown' in its Hit Parade of a Half-Century as the representative song for 1919.

The song is about Irene's favourite dress which she wore until it was worn out, and begins:

I once had a gown it was almost new
Oh, the daintiest thing, it was sweet Alice Blue

== See also ==
- List of individual dresses
