= Mary Glynne =

Welsh actress (1895–1954)

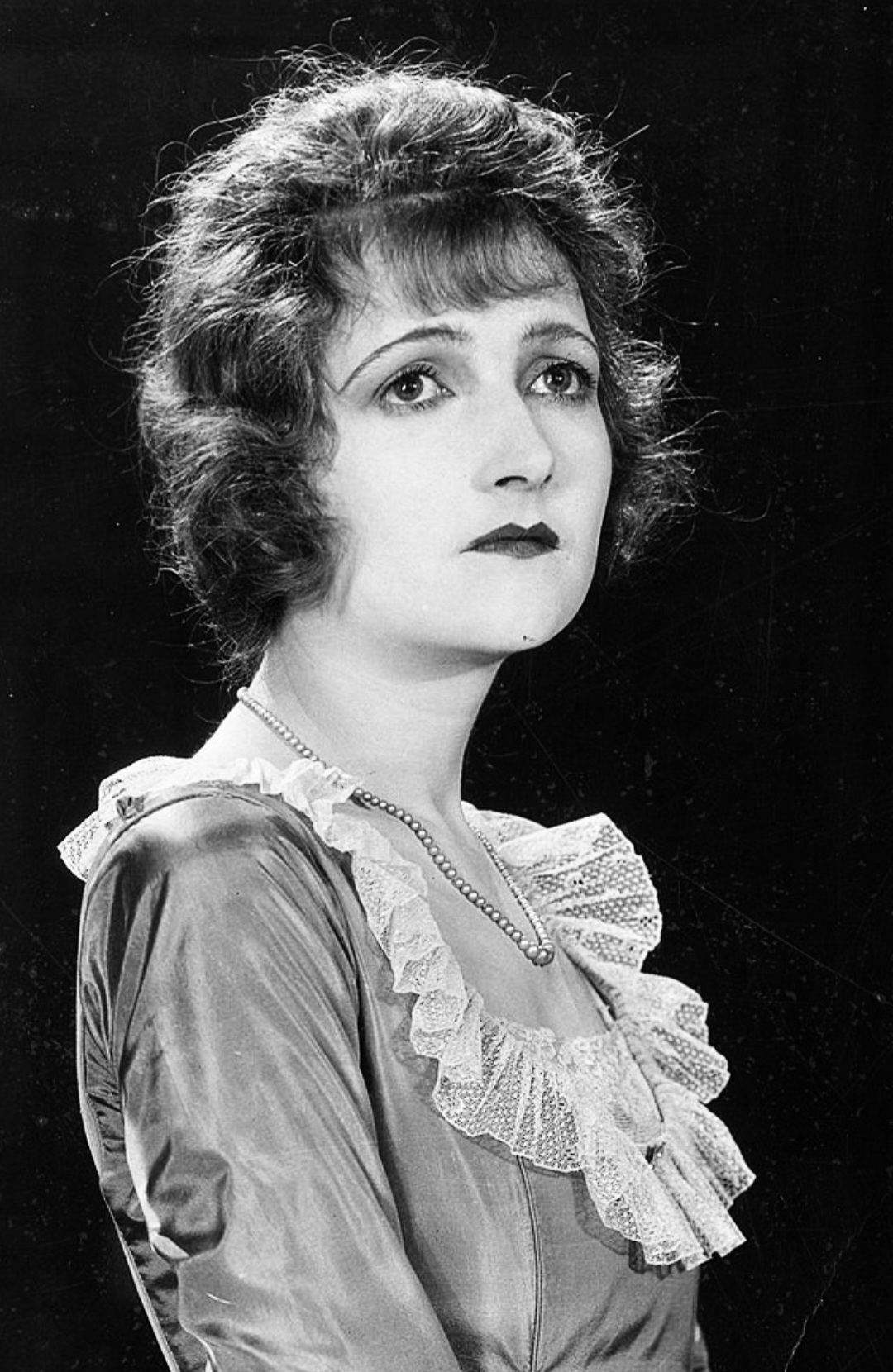
- Glynne in 1923
- Born: Mary Aitken; 25 January 1895; Penarth, Vale of Glamorgan, Wales
- Died: 19 September 1954 (aged 59); London, England
- Occupation: Actress
- Years active: 1919–1939
- Spouse: Dennis Neilson-Terry

Mary Glynne (born Mary Aitken; 25 January 1895 – 19 September 1954) was a British actress.

== Biography ==
Glynne was born Mary Aitken in Penarth, Vale of Glamorgan, South Wales. She started her career in 1908, in a stage play called The Dairymaids at the Princes Theatre in Manchester. A month later, she appeared on stage at the Queen's Theatre, London, in the same play. She appeared in numerous stage productions from 1908 to 1954 and in 24 films between 1919 and 1939. Following her appearance in many West End successes, she toured the provinces and, later, South Africa. She was married to Dennis Neilson-Terry, who died in Rhodesia in 1932. Glynne died in London on 19 September 1954.

== Selected filmography ==
- Unmarried (1920)
- The Call of Youth (1921)
- Appearances (1921)
- The Mystery Road (1921)
- The Princess of New York (1921)
- The White Hen (1921)
- Dangerous Lies (1921)
- The Bonnie Brier Bush (1921)
- The Good Companions (1933)
- Flat No. 3 (1934)
- Emil and the Detectives (1935)
- Scrooge (1935)
- Royal Cavalcade (1935)
- Grand Finale (1936)
- The Heirloom Mystery (1936)
- The Angelus (1937)
