= Leslie Faber (actor) =

Faber in Ambrose Applejohn's Adventure, 1921

Leslie Faber (30 August 1879 – 5 August 1929) was an English stage actor who played mostly in London and New York in the first three decades of the 20th century. He was best known for character roles in both modern and classic plays. Faber was taken prisoner during the First World War.

== Life and career ==
Faber was born in Newcastle, in north east England, and educated abroad. He made his first stage appearance in Frank Benson's company. His London debut was with Benson's company at the Lyceum in 1900, as the Duke of Westmorland in Henry V. He rapidly established himself as a West End star. In the words of The Times, "Pleasant parts in good plays at the best theatres were his lot for many years."

In 1906, he made the first of several successful visits to the United States. Most of the plays in which he appeared on Broadway and in the West End were popular but ephemeral, although he took part in a revival of Lady Windermere's Fan in 1905. During the First World War he joined the army and was taken prisoner. Resuming his stage career in 1919 he continued to appear in popular modern plays, but added some classics to his repertoire, including De Guiche in Cyrano de Bergerac (1919), Macduff in Macbeth (1921), Jason in Medea (1923), and John Worthing in The Importance of Being Earnest (1923).

Shortly before his death, he had successfully embarked on theatrical management in partnership with Ronald Squire. He was taken ill with an abscess on the lung, and after an operation, he contracted pneumonia and pleurisy, from which he died at the age of 49. Sir Michael Redgrave said that Faber was a "popular, high-paid 'star'-actor, but so complete an artist that he could appear in two leading parts in the same play without the audience knowing of it."
