= Ode to Death =

Music by Gustav Holst

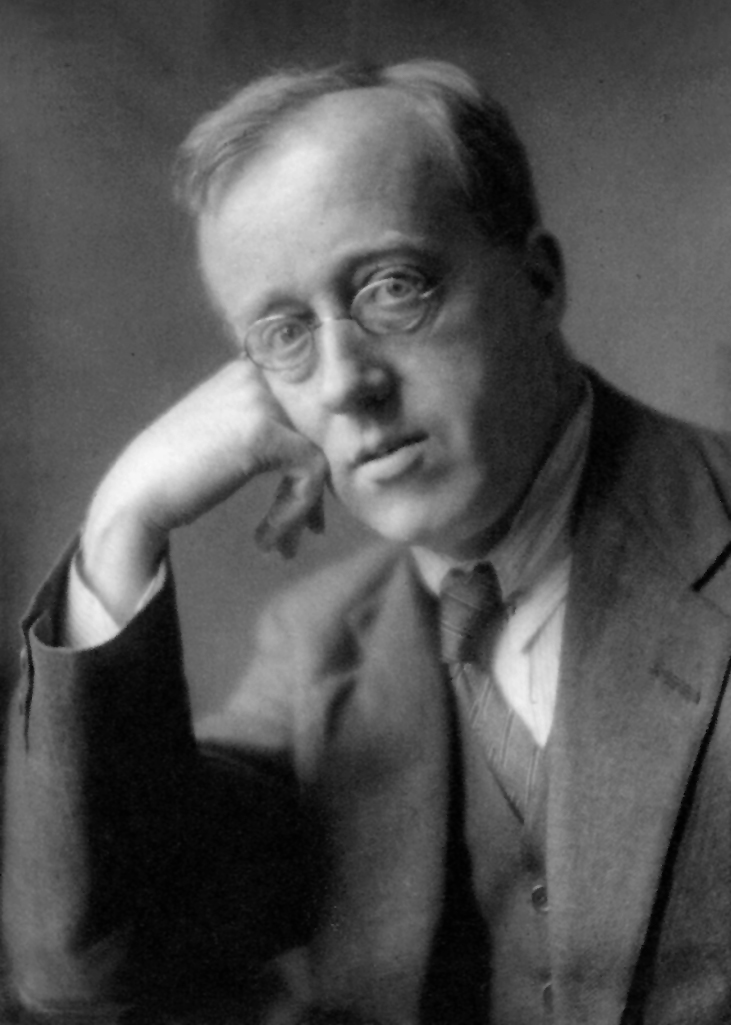
Gustav Holst ca. 1921

Ode to Death, H. 144, Op. 38, is a musical composition for chorus and orchestra written by English composer Gustav Holst (1874–1934) in 1919. It is a setting of a passage from Walt Whitman's 1865 elegy When Lilacs Last in the Dooryard Bloom'd, which was written to mourn the death of American president Abraham Lincoln.

After World War I, Gustav Holst turned to the last section of Whitman's elegy to mourn friends killed in the war in composing his Ode to Death. Holst saw Whitman "as a New World prophet of tolerance and internationalism as well as a new breed of mystic whose transcendentalism offered an antidote to encrusted Victorianism." Sullivan also says, "Holst invests Whitman's vision of 'lovely and soothing death' with luminous open chords that suggest a sense of infinite space....Holst is interested here in indeterminacy, a feeling of the infinite, not in predictability and closure."

In the Ode to Death, the quiet, resigned mood is seen by Matthews as an "abrupt volte-face" after the life-enhancing spirituality of the Hymn. Imogen Holst believed the Ode expressed Holst's private attitude to death. According to fellow composers Ralph Vaughan Williams and Ernest Walker it is considered by many to be Holst's most beautiful choral work.
