= Blue Room (The Girl Friend song) =

1926 show tune by Rodgers and Hart

Song
- Published: 1926
- Genre: Showtune
- Composer: Richard Rodgers
- Lyricist: Lorenz Hart

"Blue Room" is a show tune from the 1926 Rodgers and Hart musical The Girl Friend, where it was introduced by Eva Puck and Sammy White. It is also a jazz standard.

== Early recordings ==
- It was recorded by The Revelers on June 8, 1926, and originally released by Victor as catalog number 20082B, with the flip side "Valencia"; it was re-released by Victor as catalog number 24707, with the flip side "Dancing in the Dark".
- In June 1927, while the Hamilton Sisters and Fordyce were on tour in England, they recorded two versions of this song: one with The Savoy Orpheans, and the other with Bert Ambrose and His Orchestra.
- Another recording was made on October 17, 1933, by the Dorsey Brothers Orchestra, and released by Brunswick Records as catalog number 6722, with the flip side "Fidgety Feet".
- Another recording was made on July 16, 1934, by Isham Jones and his orchestra, and released by Victor Records as catalog number 24701A, with the flip side "Georgia Jubilee".
- Another recording was made on December 15, 1936, by Jan Garber and his orchestra, and released by Brunswick Records as catalog number 7870, with the flip side "Moonlight and Roses". The same recording was later released by Vocalion Records as catalog number 5484 and by Conqueror Records as catalog number 9496, both with the flip side "Home on the Range".
- Another recording was made on January 16, 1938, by Benny Goodman and his orchestra, as part of the live Carnegie Hall jazz concert; but it was re-released as a 45 rpm record by Columbia Records as catalog number 39312, with the flip side "Swingtime in the Rockies".
- A recording of the song in a medley with "Am I Blue?" was made on July 14, 1942, by Eddy Duchin and released by Columbia Records as catalog number 36746, with the flip side a medley of "Sometimes I'm Happy" and "Pretty Baby".
- Another recording was made by Mark Warnow and released by MGM Records as catalog number 30040, with the flip side "Bess, You Is My Woman".

== Later recordings ==
- It was recorded in 1952 by Blue Barron and released by MGM Records as catalog number 30687, with the flip side "Blue Moments."
- Bing Crosby recorded the song on his 1956 album Bing Sings Whilst Bregman Swings.
- Another 1956 recording was made by Ella Fitzgerald as part of her Ella Fitzgerald Sings the Rodgers and Hart Song Book album.
- Another recording was made by Tommy Dorsey and his orchestra, released by Decca Records as catalog number 29057, with the flip side "Liza Jane."
- Eliane Elias included the song on her 2013 album I Thought About You.
- Notable small group recordings of "Blue Room" include Miles Davis (1951), Thad Jones (1956), Jimmy Smith (1957), Hank Jones (1958), Gene Ammons (1960), The Jazztet (1961), and Bill Charlap (1999)

== Use in films and television ==
- It was featured in the 1948 film Words and Music, where it was sung by Perry Como, who played Eddie Lorrison Anders. Como would later record it twice in 1948: the first on May 29; the second, with Henri René conducting, on December 17. The first recording was included on the soundtrack album of Words and Music; while the second, released as a single, (RCA Victor Records catalog numbers 20-3329-A on 78 rpm and 47-3329-A on 45 rpm, with the flip side "With a Song in My Heart") reached the position of #18 on the charts. It was also released by the His Master's Voice (UK), catalog number BD 1280.
- In 1946, it was featured in a scene in The Big Sleep starring Humphrey Bogart and Lauren Bacall.
- In 1950, it was used in Young Man with a Horn when it was played by Kirk Douglas (dubbed by Harry James).
- In 1970, Cass Elliot covered the song on The Ed Sullivan Show (salute to Richard Rodgers).
