= Danny Dare =

American film director

Danny Dare (March 20, 1905, New York City – November 20, 1996, Tarzana, Los Angeles, California) was an American choreographer, actor, director, writer, and producer of the stage, screen, and film.

== Career ==
Dare began his career in the 1920s as an actor on the New York stage, making his Broadway theatre debut in 1923 in the musical Dew Drop Inn. He then performed on the vaudeville circuit, where he also gained experience as a choreographer, comedy sketch writer, and eventually a producer. In 1927 he portrayed Ronnie Webb in the musical The Five O'Clock Girl, also serving as the show's assistant choreographer. He soon became highly busy as a choreographer on Broadway, serving in that capacity for such shows as The Little Show (1929), Sweet Adeline (1929) Sweet and Low (1930), You Said It (1931), and Tattle Tales (1933). In 1931 he produced the play Sentinels and later produced, directed, and wrote the book for the musical Meet the People (1940).

Dare's talents as a choreographer drew the attention of executives at Paramount Pictures and he was offered a contract with the studio in 1929. He went on to choreograph several films with the company including Let's Go Places (1930), Such Men Are Dangerous (1930), Not Damaged (1930), Wild People (1932), Three Cheers for Love (1936), Start Cheering (1938), Hit Parade of 1941 (1940), Panama Hattie (1942), and most notably Holiday Inn (1942). The last film he choreographed was Road to Utopia in 1946.

In 1938 Dare turned to directing for the first time with the film The Main Event. He never directed another film, but he was active as a television director during the 1950s with the shows Damon Runyon Theater and How to Marry a Millionaire. He also produced a total of eight films between 1945 and 1952.
