= Love Birds (Romberg and MacDonald) =

Musical by Sigmund Romberg and Ballard MacDonald

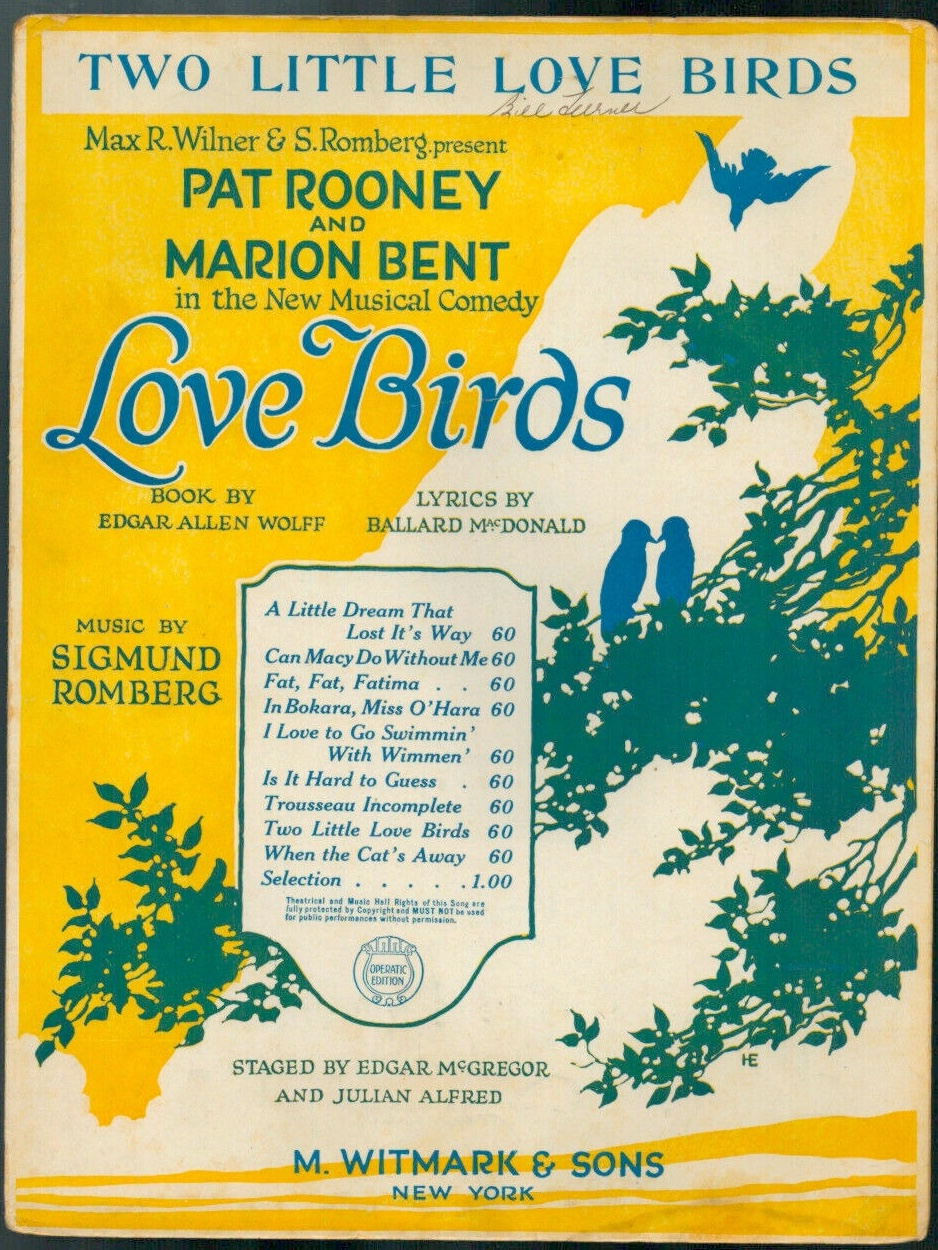
Front cover of the sheet music for "Two Little Lovebirds" from Love Birds. Published by M. Witmark & Sons in 1921.

Love Birds is a musical in two acts with music by Sigmund Romberg, lyrics by Ballard MacDonald, and a book by Edgar Allan Woolf. The work premiered at Broadway's Apollo Theatre on March 15, 1921. In ran there for 103 performances, closing on June 11, 1921. It was produced by Alfred Maria Willner and Romberg and co-directed by Edgar MacGregor, Julian Alfred and Frank Smithson. The musical starred Pat Rooney as Pat, Marion Bent as Mamie O'Grady, Elizabeth Hines as Allene Charteris, Barrett Greenwood as Hal Sterling, and Evelyn Cavanaugh as Violet Morely among others.
