= Mabel Withee =

American actress (c. 1897–1952)

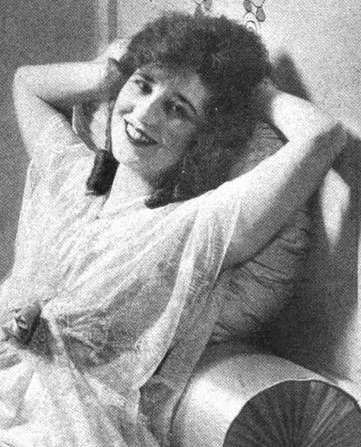
- Mabel Withee, from a 1919 publication
- Born: c. 1897; Detroit, Michigan, U.S.
- Died: November 3, 1952 (aged 54-55); Bayside, Queens, New York City, U.S.
- Occupation: Actress
- Spouses: Herman Leon Sarshik (m. 1926; ann. 1928) Larry Puck (m. 1928)
- Children: 1

Mabel Withee (c. 1897 – November 3, 1952) was an American actress on stage and in silent film.

== Early life ==
Withee was born in Detroit, Michigan, the daughter of Leonard Withee.

== Career ==
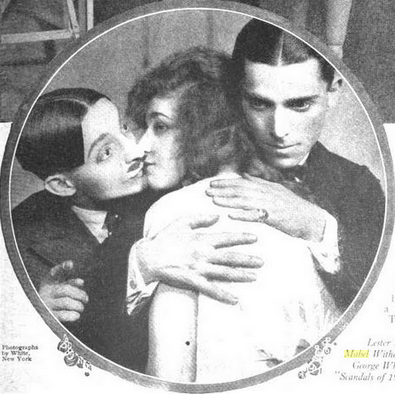
Lester Allen, Mabel Withee, and George White, from Scandals of 1919.

Withee's Broadway appearances were mainly in musical comedies and revues, including roles in Sinbad (1918–1919, with Al Jolson and Kitty Doner), George White's Scandals (1919), Just a Minute (1919), The Rose Girl (1921, the first show at the Ambassador Theatre), Sonny (1921), The Rose of Stanboul (1922), The World We Live In (1922–1923), Lady Butterfly (1923), Dew Drop Inn (1923), Artists and Models (1924–1925), The Cocoanuts (1925–1926, with the Marx Brothers). She also starred in Mary Ann (1927) on vaudeville.

She acted in one silent film, Once to Every Man (1918).

Theatre critic George Jean Nathan considered Withee to have "the most beautiful legs in the world". She retired from show business in 1928, when she married her second husband.

== Personal life ==
Withee was "wooed" by Egyptian prince Mohammed Ali Ibrahim in 1922, but rejected his proposal of marriage. She married real estate broker Herman Leon Sarshik in 1926. She asked for the marriage to be annulled on the basis of fraud in 1928. She married again, to producer Larry Puck, later that year, and through him was the sister-in-law of actress Eva Puck. She had one son, Emmett Puck. She died in 1952, in her mid-fifties, in Bayside, Queens.
