= The Girl Friend =

- Sheet Music
- Music: Richard Rodgers
- Lyrics: Lorenz Hart
- Book: Herbert Fields
- Productions: 1926 Broadway

The Girl Friend is a musical comedy with music by Richard Rodgers, lyrics by Lorenz Hart and book by Herbert Fields. This was the longest running show for the trio to that date.

== Production ==
The Girl Friend opened on Broadway at the Vanderbilt Theatre on March 17, 1926, and closed on December 27, 1926, after 301 performances. Produced by Lew Fields (Herbert's father), staged by John Harwood with musical staging by Jack Haskell, the cast starred Sammy White, Eva Puck and June Cochrane. White and Puck were married and well-known vaudeville performers of the time.

== Plot ==
Setting: Long Island, New York

A cyclist trains on a wheel connected to a butter churn on his dairy farm. He is in love with the daughter of a professional cyclist. He is urged to enter a six-day bicycle race by a questionable cycling promoter. Various gamblers try to cause him to lose, but he wins the race and the girl.

== Characters ==
Characters
Name	Gender	Vocal Range	Original Cast
Ellen	Female	Example	Dorothy Barber
Jane Talbot	Female	Example	Dorothy Barber
Duffy	Male	Example	Walter Bigelow
Wynn Spencer	Female	Example	Evelyn Cavanaugh
Irene Covel	Female	Example	June Cochrane
Fanny Silver	Female	Example	Eva Condon
Arthur Spencer	Male	Example	Frank Doane
Donald Litt	Male	Example	Francis X. Donegan
Frank	Male	Example	Joel Duroe
Thomas Larson	Male	Example	John Hundley
Mike	Male	Example	Jack Kogan
Mme. Ruby DeLilly	Female	Example	Jan Moore
Henry	Male	Example	Herman Newman
Mollie Farrell	Female	Example	Eva Puck
Eddie	Male	Example	Leon Rose
Jim	Male	Example	Paul Sabin
Ann	Female	Example	Silvia Shawn
Bill	Male	Example	Sanford Wolf

== Songs ==
Act 1

- "Hey! Hey!"
- "The Simple Life"
- "The Girl Friend"
- "Goodbye, Lenny"
- "Blue Room"
- "Cabarets"
- "Why Do I?"
- "The Damsel Who Done All the Dirt"
- "He's a Winner"
- "Town Hall Tonight"
- "Good Fellow, Mine"

Act 2

- "Creole Cooning Song"
- "I'd Like to Take You Home"
- "What Is It?"

== Critical response ==
Reviewers praised the humor, dancing, and the "captivating music." The New York American reviewer wrote: "This WAS music, instead of molasses. There was a ditty called 'The Blue Room' which should be sung to exhaustion".
