= Dew Drop Inn (musical) =

Musical composed by Alfred Goodman and Rudolf Friml

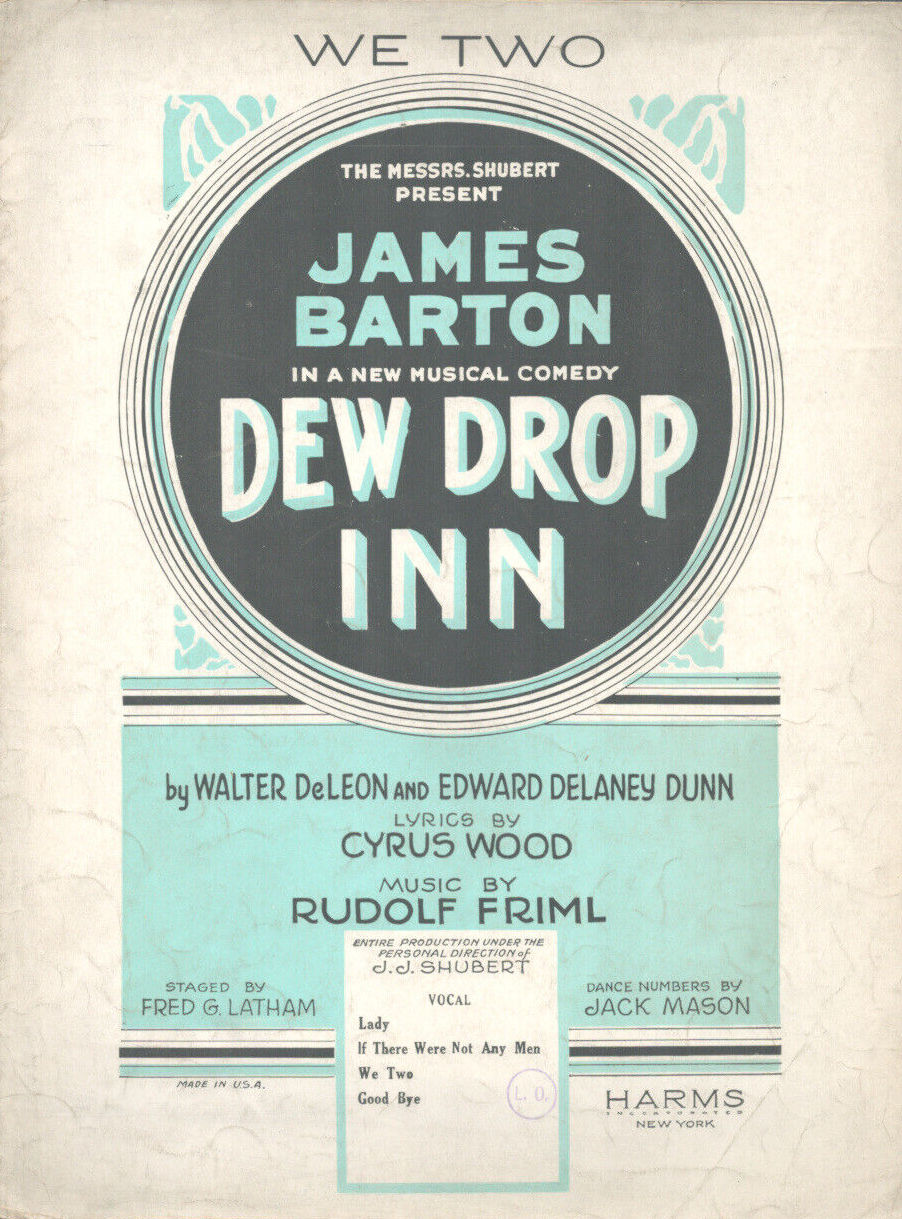
Sheet music cover

Dew Drop Inn is a musical with music by Alfred Goodman and Rudolf Friml, lyrics by Cyrus Wood, and a book by Walter DeLeon and Edward Delaney Dunn. While Goodman was the principal composer for the work, composers Rudolf Friml, John Frederick Coots, and Jean Schwartz also contributed songs to the show in collaboration with lyricist McElbert Moore.

Produced by Jacob J. Shubert and directed by Fred G. Latham, the musical premiered on Broadway at the Astor Theatre on May 17, 1923, where it ran until August 25, 1923 for a total of 88 performances. The cast included James Barton, Alice Brady, Spencer Charters, Harry Clark, Danny Dare, Evelyn Cavanaugh, and Mabel Withee. The musical is set at a seaside resort somewhere in Southern California. Barton starred in blackface as the hotel porter, Ananias Washington.

Critic Burns Mantle described Dew Drop Inn as being primarily a vehicle for Barton, "an entertainment evidently intended for a summer run, being as fresh as flowers in its costuming, and as generously hued," but added that "the fun I thought pretty thin."
