= Evelyn Cavanaugh =

American actress

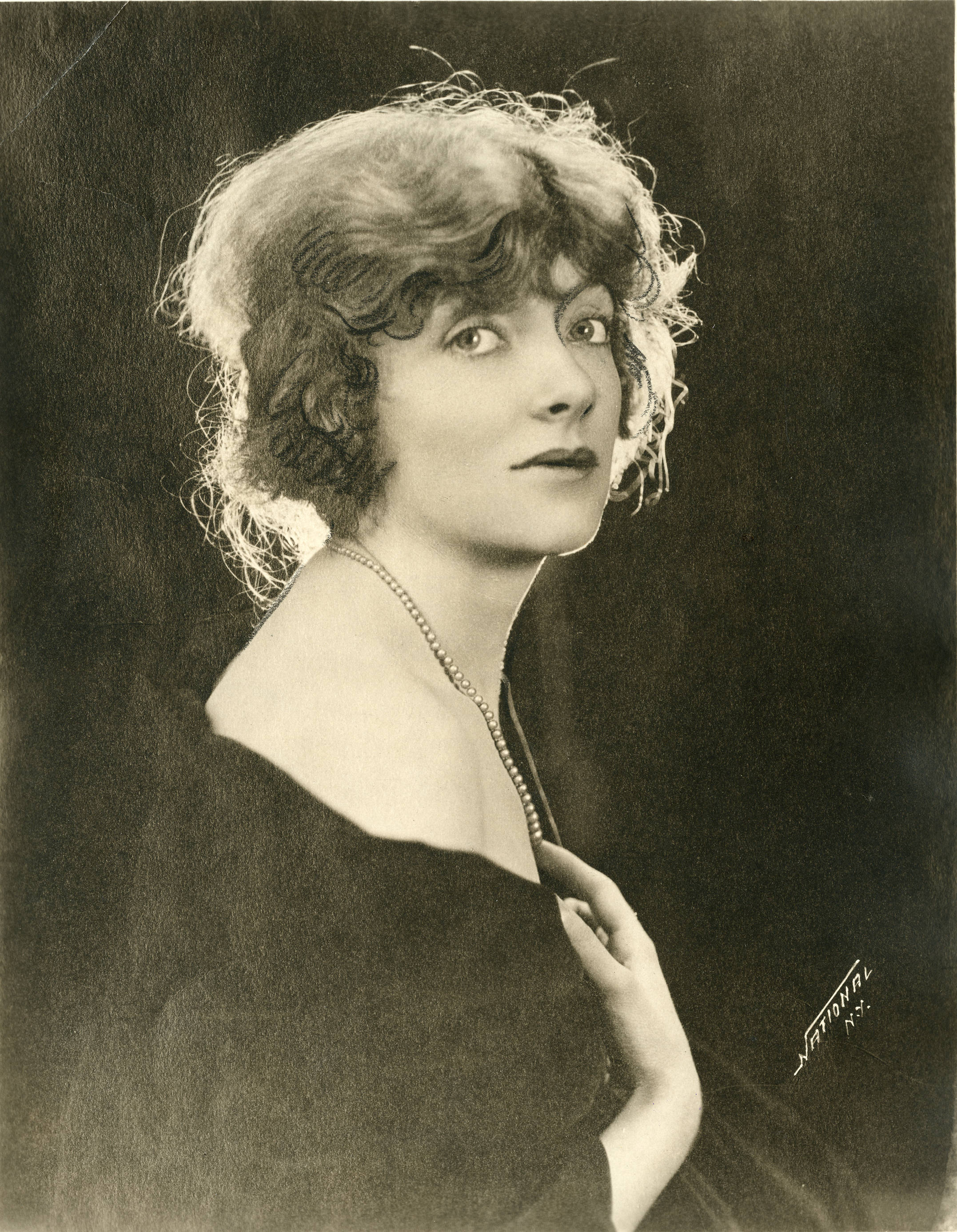
- Evelyn Cavanaugh, from a 1922 publication
- Born: Troy, New York, US
- Occupations: Dancer, actress

Evelyn Cavanaugh was an American actress, singer, and dancer in Broadway musical comedies in the 1910s and 1920s.

== Early life and education ==
Cavanaugh was born in Troy, New York. She attended the boarding school at Visitation Convent in Washington, D.C.

== Career ==
Cavanaugh's Broadway credits included roles in His Little Widows (1917), The Kiss Burglar (1918), My Golden Girl (1920), Love Birds (1921), Kissing Time (1921), Dew Drop Inn (1923), In the Moonlight (1923), Wildflower (1923-1924), and The Girl Friend (1926). She also toured in a vaudeville act with dance partner James Doyle.

She was generally praised by critics. "Evelyn Cavanaugh and Richard Dore made a handsome couple and both their dances went big with the audience," reported Variety in 1919. "Miss Cavanaugh's singing showed a good voice, her personality adding a good deal to the performance."
