= 1926 in country music =

This is a list of notable events in country music that took place in the year 1926.

== Top Hillbilly (Country) Recordings ==
The following songs were extracted from records included in Joel Whitburn's Pop Memories 1890-1954, record sales reported on the "Discography of American Historical Recordings" website, and other sources as specified. Numerical rankings are approximate, they are only used as a frame of reference.

Rank	Artist	Title	Label	Recorded	Released	Chart Positions
1	Vernon Dalhart	"The Prisoner's Song"	Victor 19427	August 13, 1924	November 1924	US BB 1926 #2, US #1 for 5 weeks, 20 total weeks, US Hillbilly 1926 #1, 1,320,356 sales thru 1930
2	Poole's North Carolina Ramblers	"Whitehouse Blues"	Columbia 15099	September 20, 1926	October 1926	US Hillbilly 1926 #2
3	Vernon Dalhart	"There's A New Star In Heaven Tonight - Rudolph Valentino"	Columbia 718	August 27, 1926	October 1926	US BB 1926 #37, US #4 for 1 week, 5 total weeks, US Hillbilly 1926 #3
4	Carl T. Sprague	"O Bury Me Not On the Lone Prairie (The Dying Cowboy)"	Victor 20122	June 22, 1926	December 1926	US Hillbilly 1926 #4
5	Gid Tanner and His Skillet Lickers with Riley Puckett	"Turkey in the Straw"	Columbia 15084	April 17, 1926	June 1926	US BB 1926 #176, US #14 for 1 week, 1 total weeks, US Hillbilly 1926 #5
6	Uncle Dave Macon with Sam McGhee	"Way Down the Old Plank Road"	Vocalion 15321	April 14, 1926	June 1926	US Hillbilly 1926 #6
7	Gid Tanner and His Skillet Lickers with Riley Puckett	"Ya Gotta Quit Kickin' My Dog Around"	Columbia 15084D	April 17, 1926	June 1926	US Hillbilly 1926 #7
8	Vernon Dalhart	"The Governor's Pardon"	Victor 19983	March 2, 1926	May 1926	US BB 1926 #90, US #8 for 1 week, 2 total weeks, US Hillbilly 1926 #8
9	Kelly Harrell	"Butcher's Boy"	Victor 20242	June 8, 1926	November 1926	US Hillbilly 1926 #9
10	Riley Puckett and Bob Nichols (Clayton McMichen)	"My Carolina Home"	Columbia 15095D	April 22, 1926	October 1926	US BB 1927 #205, US #16 for 1 week, 1 total weeks, US Hillbilly 1926 #10
11	Vernon Dalhart	"The Miami Storm"	Columbia 15100	September 23, 1926	October 1926	US BB 1927 #174, US #14 for 1 week, 2 total weeks, US Hillbilly 1926 #11
12	Johnny Marvin (Ukelele Ace)	"Breezin' Along with the Breeze"	Columbia 699D	June 29, 1926	September 1926	US BB 1926 #10, US #1 for 2 weeks, 10 total weeks, US Hillbilly 1926 #12
13	Gid Tanner and His Skillet Lickers with Riley Puckett	"Bully of the Town"	Columbia 15074D	April 17, 1926	June 1926	US Hillbilly 1926 #13
14	Al Craver (Vernon Dalhart)	"The Freight Wreck At Altoona"	Columbia 15065D	January 15, 1926	March 1926	US Hillbilly 1926 #14
15	Poole's North Carolina Ramblers	"Monkey On A String"	Columbia 15099	September 17, 1926	October 1926	US Hillbilly 1926 #15
16	Blind Lemon Jefferson	"Jack O Diamond Blues"	Paramount 12373	June 12, 1926	August 1926	US Hillbilly 1926 #16
17	Gid Tanner and His Skillet Lickers with Riley Puckett	"Hand Me Down My Walking Cane"	Columbia 15091D	April 17, 1926	September 1926	US Hillbilly 1926 #17
18	Blind Blake	"Early Morning Blues"	Paramount 12387	September 11, 1926	October 1926	US Hillbilly 1926 #18
19	Blind Lemon Jefferson	"Long Lonesome Blues"	Paramount 12354	March 18, 1926	May 1926	US Hillbilly 1926 #19
20	Uncle Dave Macon	"Last Night When My Willie Come Home"	Vocalion 15319	April 14, 1926	May 1926	US Hillbilly 1926 #20

== Births ==
- January 2 – Harold Bradley, session guitarist. (died 2019).
- January 12 – Ray Price, "The Cherokee Cowboy," multi-faceted country performer from the 1950s onward (died 2013).
- December 21 – Freddie Hart, best known for his string of early to mid-1970s hits, including "Easy Loving" (died 2018).
