= The Cocoanuts (musical) =

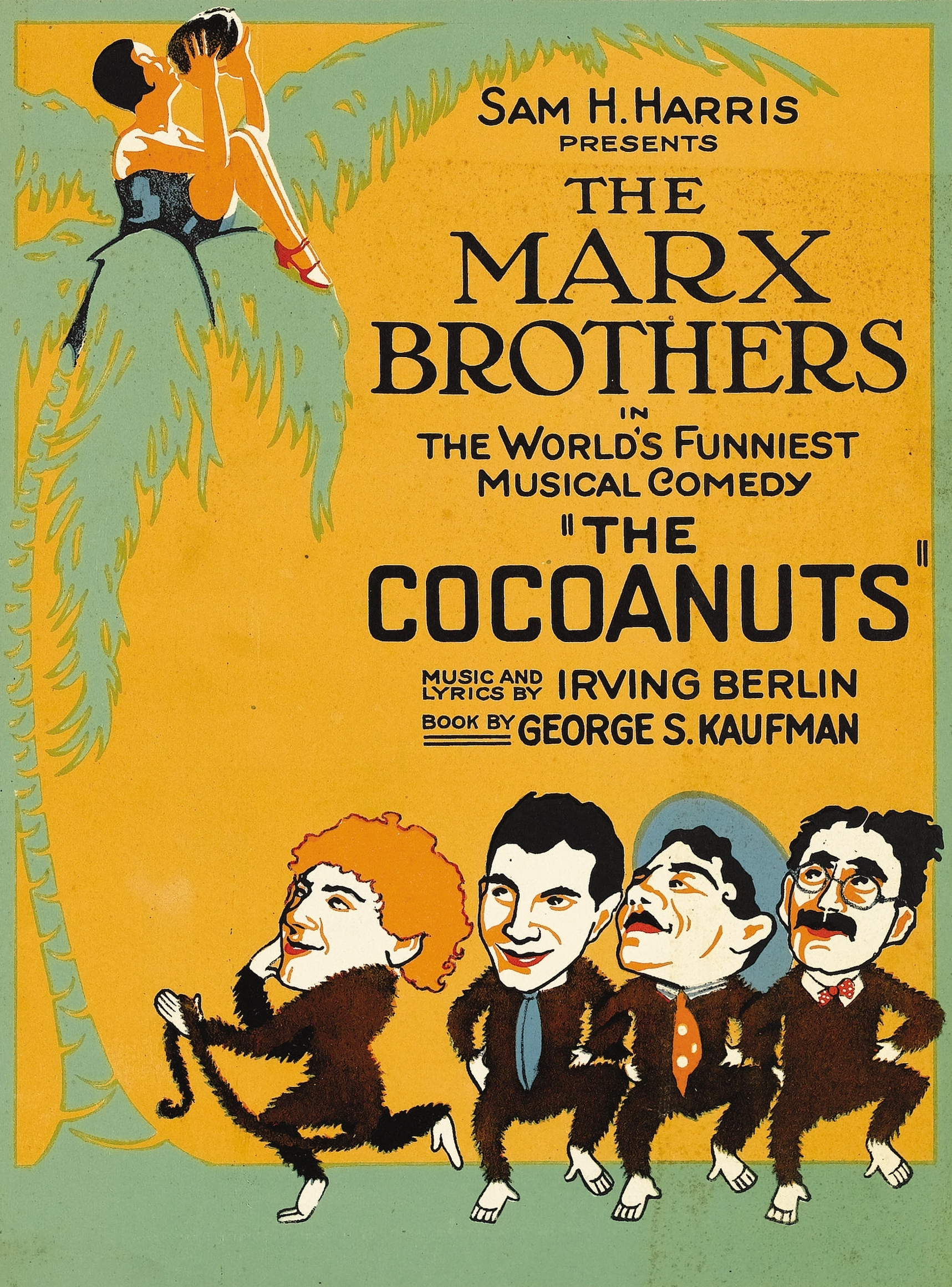
- Illustration from the 1927 run
- Music: Irving Berlin
- Lyrics: Irving Berlin
- Book: George S. Kaufman; Morrie Ryskind (additional text)
- Productions: 1925 Broadway; 1926 "Summer Edition"; 1927 Broadway revival

The Cocoanuts is a musical with music and lyrics by Irving Berlin and a book by George S. Kaufman, with additional text by Morrie Ryskind.

== Background ==
The Cocoanuts was written for the Marx Brothers after the success of their hit Broadway revue I'll Say She Is (1924). The Cocoanuts is set against the backdrop of the 1920s Florida Land Boom, which was followed by the inevitable bust. Groucho is a hotel proprietor, land impresario, and con man, assisted and hampered by two inept grifters, Chico and Harpo, and the ultra-rational hotel assistant, Zeppo. Groucho pursues a wealthy dowager ripe for a swindle, played by the dignified Margaret Dumont.

Produced by Sam H. Harris, the musical was given a tryout in Boston on October 26, 1925, then Philadelphia. The Broadway run opened at the Lyric Theatre on December 8, 1925 and closed on August 7, 1926 after 276 performances. The production was directed by Oscar Eagle, with musical staging by Sammy Lee.

After the Broadway closing, the brothers took the show on tour. On June 10, 1926, four new songs and other changes were introduced in the show. The new version, referred to as the "1926 Summer Edition", featured the Brox Sisters, who sang the songs originally assigned to the character of Penelope.

A brief Broadway revival played at the Century Theatre from May 16, 1927 to May 28, 1927 with the same creative team. The more famous film adaptation was released by Paramount Pictures in 1929, soon after the addition of synchronized sound permitted talking movies.

== Synopsis ==
=== Act 1 ===
Scene 1 – Lobby of The Cocoanuts, a hotel in Cocoanut Beach, Florida.

The hotel guests love Florida, but not the hotel. Eddie, a bellhop, asks Jamison, a hotel desk clerk, when the staff will get paid. Jamison gives an evasive response and suggests that he ask Mr. Schlemmer, the hotel owner. Harvey Yates enters, followed shortly by Mrs. Potter. Mrs. Potter wants her daughter, Polly, to marry Harvey, since she has known his family for a long time. She exits as Penelope Martin enters. Penelope and Harvey know each other from their backgrounds in thievery. Penelope suggests to Harvey that he can strike it rich by marrying Polly, since Mrs. Potter has millions of dollars. Polly soon enters and makes it clear that she is romantically interested in Bob Adams, an architecture student who is currently the chief clerk of the hotel. But Mrs. Potter won't allow Polly to be seen with Bob. She comments, "One who clerks, Polly, is a clerk. And that settles it." After Mrs. Potter exits, Polly laments the restrictions placed on her ("Family Reputation").

The owner of the hotel, Henry W. Schlemmer, enters, and the bellboys go after him asking for their wages. Through fast double-talk he is able to distract them and send them on their way. He has his eyes on Mrs. Potter, trying unsuccessfully to convince her to buy the hotel. Meanwhile, Bob and Polly discuss their predicament. He has a plan to build housing on a particular lot in Cocoanut Manor. The bellhops try to convince Bob that he's fortunate ("Lucky Boy"). Schlemmer and Jamison are at the desk discussing business when Willie the Wop and Silent Sam enter and start to wreak havoc. After they leave, Harvey and Penelope discuss how she will steal Mrs. Potter's valuable necklace later that evening. Schlemmer explains to the girls why he is a "Hit With The Ladies". Detective Hennessy enters along with Willie and Sam and explains that he's looking for two wanted men whose descriptions they fit. Although he won't do anything yet, he warns them. After they leave, Bob asks Polly whether she could live on that lot in Cocoanut Manor ("A Little Bungalow").

Scene 2 – Before the Palms.

Schlemmer tries to make amorous advances toward Mrs. Potter. "I don't think you'd love me if I were poor" she says, to which Schlemmer responds "I might, but I'd keep my mouth shut." To prove his interest, he tells her about "A Little Bungalow" (reprise).

Scene 3 – Two adjacent rooms in the hotel.

Penelope is getting ready to steal Mrs. Potter's necklace and waits for Harvey. Meanwhile, Sam sneaks in and hides under Penelope's bed. Harvey discusses with Penelope where they will put the necklace. He suggests a hollow tree stump on Cocoanut Manor and draws a map. After he leaves, Penelope studies the map and throws in the garbage, but Sam immediately retrieves it, unseen.

As Penelope tries to enter Mrs. Potter's room, she and Mrs. Potter have to contend with a series of encounters with Schlemmer, Willie and Hennessey. Penelope finally succeeds in stealing the necklace and re-enters her own room, proclaiming "Alone at last," not realizing that Sam is still under the bed.

Scene 4 – Before the Palms.

The guests extol "Florida By The Sea". Meanwhile, Schlemmer explains to Willie how to bid in the upcoming property auction. After much misunderstanding, Willie agrees.

Scene 5 – Cocoanut Manor.

Frances Williams and the guest await the auction ("Monkey Doodle-Doo"). Schlemmer begins the auction. He starts the bidding, but Willie bids against himself. Lot after lot is "sold" to Willie, who seems to keep bidding higher and higher against his own bids. Finally Schlemmer reaches Lot 26, which is both the lot where Bob wants to build his house and the lot containing the hollow tree stump where Penelope and Harvey are hiding Mrs. Potter's stolen necklace. Bidding between Bob and Harvey becomes fierce. Willie knocks out Harvey, and Bob wins the auction for Lot 26. Just then, Mrs. Potter proclaims that her necklace has been stolen. Hennessey steps forward and tries to investigate. Sam produces the necklace from the hollow tree stump. Harvey suggests that Bob must know something about the necklace, since he won the lot in an auction. Penelope steps forward and fabricates a story in which she teases Bob for stealing the necklace. That's enough for Hennessey, who arrests Bob and takes him away. Mrs. Potter then announces the engagement of Harvey to Polly, to be celebrated with a dinner at the hotel that night. All exit except Polly who is left crying. Sam consoles Polly but winks at the audience.

=== Act 2 ===
Scene 1 – The Lounge of the hotel.

Penelope and the guests have "Five O'Clock Tea". Polly asks Schlemmer for 2,000 dollars to get Bob out of jail. Schlemmer humorously discusses this with Willie and Sam, and eventually Mrs. Potter, without telling her what the money is for. Everyone dances ("They're Blaming the Charleston"). Harvey and Penelope worry about the map he drew, which would implicate them in the robbery. Willie enters, and they realize he has the map. They leave, and Schlemmer enters with Bob, whom he got out of jail for nineteen hundred dollars – "They had a sale," he explains. Willie shows Bob the map, and Bob realizes that the map is evidence. That makes him feel better, and together with Polly, they comment, "We Should Care".

Mrs. Potter enters with Schlemmer to discuss the engagement dinner. Hennessey is conducting an investigation, hampered by Willie, Sam and Schlemmer. He asks to hear from Penelope ("Minstrel Days"). Hennessey continues the investigation, but Willie and Sam take his shirt. Hennessey wonders what happened to his shirt.

Scene 2 – Before the Palms.

Schlemmer introduces a musical specialty number played by the De Marcos, who he describes as not being Spaniards, but Span-Yids (i.e. Jewish musicians).

Scene 3 – The Patio of the hotel.

Penelope dances a tango ("Spain"). After agreement with Bob, Polly suggests to Harvey that they elope at midnight at Cocoanut Manor, and Harvey agrees. But since Polly doesn't know where it is, she gets Harvey to draw a map of how to get there. She thanks him, takes the map, and leaves. As more guests enter for dinner, Hennessey laments his lost shirt ("The Tale of a Shirt"; the melody combines the Habanera and Toreador song from Carmen). As master of ceremonies, Schlemmer makes a speech concerning the engagement of Harvey to Polly. He then introduces Mrs. Potter, who makes a few short remarks interrupted by constant interjections by Schlemmer, Willie and Sam. Harvey makes a short speech. Then Willie plays a piano number, followed by Sam playing the harp.

Polly dashes in and proclaims that she has new evidence, showing the map that Harvey drew for her alongside the one he drew for Penelope. Hennessey sees for himself that the handwriting is identical. Bob enters and says that a millionaire from Miami wants to buy Cocoanut Manor, which will enable him to realize his architectural dreams. Polly shows the maps to her mother, who announces a "slight change" – that Polly will be engaged to Bob Adams. Everyone rejoices ("A Little Bungalow" reprise).

Note: In the original script, Schlemmer, Willie, and Sam are identified as Julius, Chico and Harpo.

== Songs ==
Act 1

- Opening: The Guests - Jamison, Cocoanut Grove Girls, Boys
- Opening: The Bellhops - Eddie, 16 Stepping Bellhops
- Family Reputation - Polly, Cocoanut Grove Beauties
- Lucky Boy - Bob, Boys
- Why Am I a Hit with the Ladies? - Schlemmer, Girls
- A Little Bungalow - Bob, Polly, Cocoanut Grove Boys and Girls
- A Little Bungalow (reprise) - Schlemmer
- Florida by the Sea - Jamison, Cocoanut Grove Boys and Girls
- Monkey Doodle-Do - Frances Williams, Ensemble
- Finale:
  - Lucky Boy (reprise)
  - A Little Bungalow (reprise) - The Entire Company

Act 2

- Opening: Tea Dance - The Eight Tea Girls
- Five O'Clock Tea - Cocoanut Grove Ensemble; specialty dance by Antonio and Nina de Marco
- They're Blaming the Charleston - Frances Williams, Antonio and Nina de Marco, and Charleston Girls
- We Should Care - Bob, Polly, Eddie, Speer, Ensemble
- Minstrel Days - Penelope, Company
- Specialty - De Marco Orchestra
- Spain (Tango Melody) - Penelope; specialty dance by Antonio and Nina de Marco
- The Tale of a Shirt - Hennessy, Company
- piano specialty - Willie (Chico)
- harp specialty - Silent Sam (Harpo)
- Finale: A Little Bungalow (reprise) - Entire Company

== Characters and original cast ==
- Program for the original 1925 run
  Jamison, the desk clerk of The Cocoanuts, a hotel in Coconut Grove, Miami, Florida
- Eddie, a bellhop
- Mrs. Potter, mother of Polly, a guest at the hotel
- Penelope Martin, a confidence woman, accomplice of Harvey
- Harvey Yates, a swindler, friend to Penelope
- Polly Potter, daughter of Mrs. Potter, in love with Bob
- Robert Adams, a young architect, in love with Polly
- Henry W. Schlemmer, the cynical, wise-cracking manager of The Cocoanuts hotel
- Willie the Wop, Italian-sounding thief
- Silent Sam, mute thief, friend and partner of Willie
- Hennessey, a police detective
- Frances Williams – Herself

== Casts ==
	Original Broadway (1925)	Broadway Revival (1927)	Off-Broadway Revival (1996)	Oregon Shakespeare Festival (2014)
Henry W. Schlemmer	Groucho Marx		Michael McGrath	Mark Bedard
Willie the Wop	Chico Marx		Peter Slutsker	John Tufts
Silent Sam	Harpo Marx		Robert Sapoff	Brent Hinkley
Jamison	Zeppo Marx		Michael Waldron	Eduardo Placer
Robert Adams	Jack Barker		Alec Timerman	Eduardo Placer
Polly Potter	Mabel Withee	Phyllis Cleveland	Becky Watson	Jennie Greenberry
Mrs. Potter	Margaret Dumont		Celia Tackaberry	K.T. Vogt
Penelope Martin	Janet Velie		Laurie Gamache	Kate Mulligan
Harvey Yates	Henry Wittmore		Michael Berresse	Robert Vincent Frank
Hennessey	Basil Ruysdael		Michael Mulheren	David Kelly
Eddie	Georgie Hale	David Breen	Brad Bradley	
Specialty Performers	Frances Williams The Breens; The DeMarcos	Frances Williams The Brox Sisters; The DeMarcos		

== Differences between musical and 1929 film ==
In addition to abridging the play for the film, there are a number of other differences:

- Groucho's character of "Henry Schlemmer" in the play, is renamed "Mr. Hammer" in the film.
- Chico and Harpo's own first names are assigned to their characters in the film's opening titles but not spoken aloud in the film. Chico is referred to as "Signor Pastrami" by both Groucho and Margaret Dumont in the film. "Wop" is an Italian ethnic slur, dropped for the film, although Chico retains his fake Italian accent, as he would throughout his career. (Note: Several times during the film, Groucho begins to call Chico "Ravelli" but stops himself; the Marxes were performing Animal Crackers on Broadway at the same time they were filming The Cocoanuts; Chico's character was "Ravelli" in that show.)
- The role of Penelope is more sharply characterized as a villain in the film; in the musical, she sings two songs which would detract somewhat from her role as a confidence woman.
- Florida by the Sea was made the opening musical number in the film.
- After musical numbers, the play opens with a sequence of dialogues between Eddie, Jamison, Mrs. Potter, Harvey, and Polly to establish their characters. These were all eliminated for the film, where the plot begins with the entrance of Mr. Hammer (Schlemmer).
- The larger role of Eddie, the bellhop from the show, is reduced to just a few lines at the beginning of the film.
- Harpo's harp specialty number was removed from the final scene of the film. Instead he plays a clarinet reprise of When My Dreams Come True, heard earlier in the film.
- The frequently reprised song A Little Bungalow was dropped from the film and was replaced by When My Dreams Come True. The melody of the verse of the latter song is derived from another song, We Should Care (which was also eliminated for the film).

== Off-Broadway revival and regional performances ==
The Cocoanuts opened in June 1996 at the American Jewish Theatre in New York City, with Michael McGrath, Peter Slutsker and Robert Sapoff as Groucho, Chico and Harpo Marx respectively.

It transferred Off-Broadway to the American Place Theatre on August 15, 1996 before closing on January 5, 1997 with Frank Ferrante starring as Groucho from October 1996 to closing in January 1997.

The Oregon Shakespeare Festival staged a revival of The Coconauts in their 2014 season, adapting the original libretto and score with additional material from other Marx Brothers projects.

In July 2018, The Cocoanuts was presented at the Heritage Theatre Festival in Charlottesville at the University of Virginia with Frank Ferrante reprising his role as Groucho, with Matt Roper and Seth Shelden joining as Chico and Harpo.

== Sources ==
- The Cocoanuts : a musical comedy in two acts - original script in the Princeton University library; photocopy in the Billy Rose Theatre Collection of The New York Public Library for the Performing Arts.
- Krasker, Tommy. Catalog of the American musical : musicals of Irving Berlin, George & Ira Gershwin, Cole Porter, Richard Rodgers & Lorenz Hart. ([Washington, D.C.] : National Institute for Opera and Musical Theater, 1988. ISBN 0-9618575-0-1
- Stubblebine, Donald J. Broadway Sheet Music: A Comprehensive Listing of Published Music From Broadway and Other Stage Shows, 1918-1993. Jefferson, NC: McFarland & Co., 1996. ISBN 0-7864-0047-1
