= Wildflower (musical) =

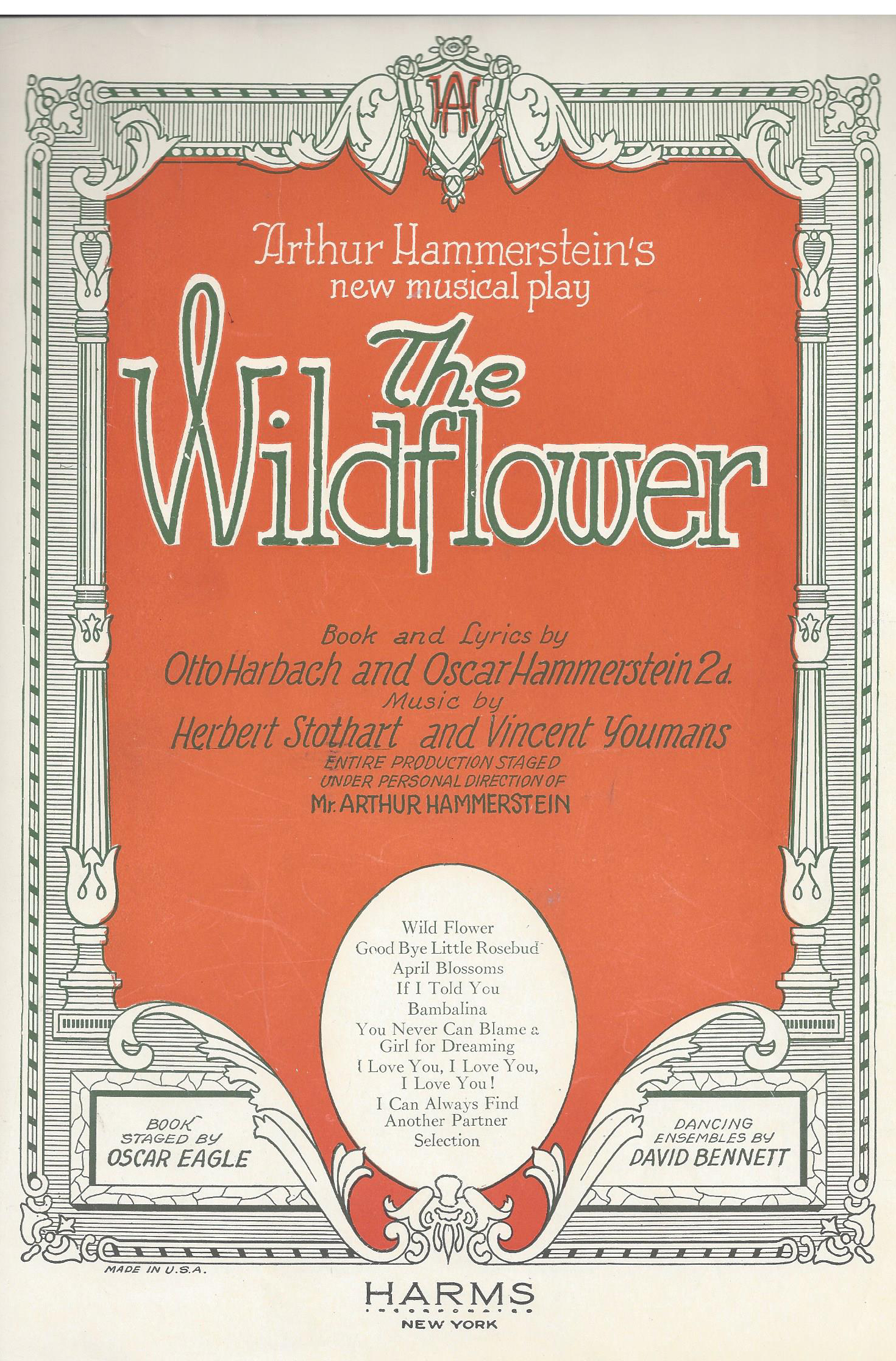
- Sheet Music Cover
- Music: Herbert Stothart & Vincent Youmans
- Lyrics: Otto Harbach & Oscar Hammerstein II
- Book: Otto Harbach & Oscar Hammerstein II

Wildflower or The Wildflower (as styled on the sheet music), is a musical in three acts with book and lyrics by Otto Harbach and Oscar Hammerstein II and music by Herbert Stothart and Vincent Youmans. The plot concerns a pretty Italian farmgirl, Nina, who has a fiery temper. She stands to inherit a fortune provided that she can keep her temper under control for six months. If she fails, the money goes to her cousin Bianca, who tries to provoke her. She manages to do it, and gets the money, as well as her man, Guido. Several of the songs were published, among which "Bambalina" and the title song were the most popular. The musical proved to be Day's last Broadway show before moving to London.

The original Broadway production at the Casino Theatre on February 7, 1923 and ran for 477 performances, closing on March 29, 1924. "Wildflower was one of the biggest successes of the Twenties." It was directed by Oscar Eagle and choreographed by David Bennett, with orchestration by Robert Russell Bennett. Costumes were by Charles LeMaire. Arthur Hammerstein produced the production. The cast starred Edith Day as Nina, Charles Judels as Gaston and Esther Howard as Lucrezia. The musical then toured for two seasons and was given an Australian production in 1924 and a London West End production, opening on February 17, 1926, and running for 114 performances, starring Kitty Reidy as Nina, with Peter Gawthorne as Alberto and Mark Daley as Gabrielle. Its London run was hampered by the 1926 national strike in Britain.

Wildflower was Oscar Hammerstein's first successful musical and Vincent Youmans' second show. It ran over a year because of its simple-minded story.

The New York Times' opening night review stated erroneously that the show "contains the most tuneful score that Rudolph Friml has written in a number of seasons" and never mentions Youmans or Stothart. The review goes on to say: "To be sure, it is practically never funny, and now and then even a little dull." Other critics also dismissed the show, although they conceded that the songs were good. Notwithstanding the reviews, Wildflower was an instant success for its operetta-like score, Edith Day's performance, and the singing, dancing and Italian setting.

== Plot ==
Pretty Nina Benedetto is a simple Italian farmgirl. Called "Wildflower" by her friends for her delightful, sunny disposition, she is nevertheless well known for her fiery temper (a family trait). She is set to marry her boyfriend, Guido, with whom she shares a tempestuous relationship. She hears that an elderly relative has left her a fortune, although the will specifies conditions: she must live for six months with her relatives on their estate at Lake Como, and if she loses her temper even once, the money falls to her scheming cousin Bianca. While there, Bianca taunts and provokes Nina and plots with her free-spending fiancé, Alberto, to make Nina melt down. Lawyer Gaston La Roche and his flirtatious wife Lucrezia would also benefit from Nina losing the inheritance. Astonishingly, Nina smiles and keeps her temper under control, defeating all their plots. So Alberto woos her, telling her that Guido is unfaithful, and tricks her into agreeing to marry him. Her loyal friend Gabrielle, and the faithful Guido, help her to overcome all of this and to hold her temper, and she gets the money and her man.

== Roles and original cast ==
- Nina Benedetto – Edith Day
- Gaston La Roche – Charles Judels
- Lucrezia La Roche – Esther Howard
- Luigi – Jerome Daly
- Bianca Benedetto – Evelyn Cavanaugh
- Gabrielle – Olin Howland
- Count Alberto – James Doyle
- Guido – Guy Robertson

== Songs ==
Act I

- Prelude ("Jamo, Jamo") - Chorus
- "I Love You, I Love You, I Love You!" – Gabrielle and Girls
- "Some Like to Hunt" – Gaston and Girls
- '"Wildflower" – Nina and Ensemble
- "Bambalina" – Lucrezia and Gabrielle
- "April Blossoms" – Nina and Guido
- "Finale Act I" - Entire Company

Act II

- "The Best Dance I’ve Had Tonight" – Bianca and Chorus
- "Course I Will" – Nina, Count Alberto and Gabrielle
- "(Girl From) Casimo" – Guido and Chorus
- "If I Told You" – Nina and Boys
- "You Never Can Blame a Girl for Dreaming" – Nina and Boys
- "Finale Act II" - Entire Company

Act III

- "Bambalina" (reprise) – Nina, Count Alberto and Ensemble
- "The World’s Worst Women" – Lucrezia and Gabrielle
- "You Can Always Find Another Partner" – Nina and Ensemble
- "Finale Act III" (Letter Scene) - Nina and Guido

== Sources ==
- Green, Stanley. The World of Musical Comedy, Da Capo Press (1980) ISBN 0306802074
- Hischak, Thomas S. The Rodgers and Hammerstein Encyclopedia. Westport, Conn.: Greenwood Publishing Group (2007) ISBN 978-0-313-34140-3.
- Mantle, Burns. The Best Plays of 1922–1923, Boston: Small, Maynard and Co. (1923)
- Boardman, Gerald. Days to Be Happy, Years to Be Sad, New York: Oxford University Press(1982)
