= Bare Facts of 1926 =

1926 Broadway musical revue

Bare Facts of 1926 is a Broadway musical revue with lyrics by Henry Myers, music by Charles M. Schwab, and a book by Stuart Hamill. It premiered on July 16, 1926, at the Triangle Theatre, and closed on October 1, 1926, after a total 107 performances.

== Production ==
The show was directed and produced by Kathleen Kirkwood. The production initially had an opening date of July 8, which was pushed back for unknown reasons. It opened at midnight on July 16, causing some sources to list its debut date as July 17.

== Cast ==
(as per BroadwayWorld)

- Joseph Battle
- Michael Burroy
- Mary Doerr
- Stephen Draper
- Sydney Haygooni
- Gladys James
- Lorette Hurley
- Rupert Lucas
- Frank Marshall
- Irene Messmer
- Nina Navarre
- Lucy Parker
- Roberta Pierre
- Lidmilla Sperantseva
- Amey Steere
- Courtenay Travers
- Mel Tyler

== Synopsis ==
The show consisted of two acts and 25 scenes. One scene, "Beautiful Schubert Poses of My Dreams", involved caricatures of other currently running musical comedies, which were put on by scantily clad cast members.

=== Songs ===
- Nice Girl
- Stand Up on Your Feet and Dance
- Triangle Blues

== Reception ==
The show received mixed to negative reviews. Some critics seemed to enjoy the production's music, but felt its sketches were "amateurish". Billboard called the show "a blot on the Triangle's artistic escutcheon" and declared that "there was no noticeable talent" besides Joseph Battle, Ruper Lucas, and Roberta Pierre.
