= Breezin' Along with the Breeze =

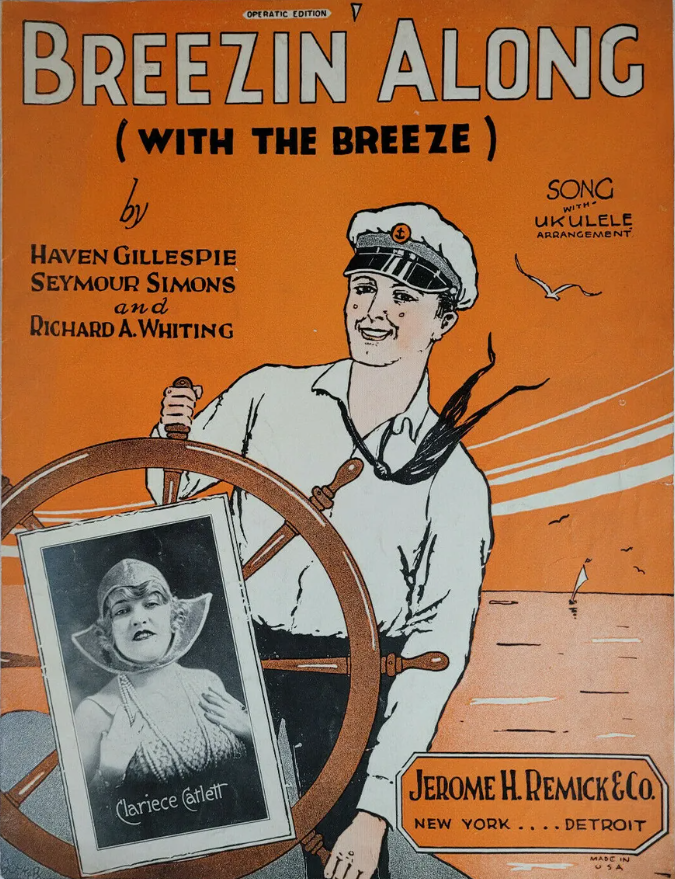
- Sheet music cover featuring Clarice Catlett, 1926

Song
- Published: 1926
- Songwriters: Haven Gillespie, Seymour Simons, and Richard Whiting

"Breezin' Along with the Breeze" is a popular song written by Haven Gillespie, Seymour Simons, and Richard Whiting; it was published in 1926. Popular versions in 1926 and 1927 were by Johnny Marvin, Abe Lyman, the Revelers and Hoosier Hot Shots.

The song was used as a signature tune by Fred Waring.

== Film appearances ==
- Shine on Harvest Moon (1944) where it was sung by Dennis Morgan and Ann Sheridan (dubbed by Lynn Martin).
- The Jazz Singer (1952)
- It was used as the theme song for the hit 1954 MGM film The Long, Long Trailer.
- The Helen Morgan Story aka Both Ends of the Candle (1957) – sung by Ann Blyth (dubbed by Gogi Grant)
- Violent Road (1958), Warner Brothers, A few lines were sung by actor Sean Garrison.
- Friendly Neighbors, 1940 Republic Pictures film in the Weaver Brothers and Elviry series of rural comedies. Sung by Cliff (Ukelele Ike) Edwards.

== Other notable recordings ==
- Perry Como – included in his album So Smooth (1955)
- Nat King Cole (1955)
- Bing Crosby – recorded the song in 1956 for use on his radio show and it was subsequently included in the box set The Bing Crosby CBS Radio Recordings (1954–56) issued by Mosaic Records (catalog MD7-245) in 2009. Later another version was included in his album That's What Life Is All About (1975)
- The Four Lads – for their album Breezin' Along (1958)
- Kay Starr – in the album Kay Starr: Jazz Singer (1960)
- Eddie Fisher (1961)
- Brook Benton – for his album There Goes That Song Again (1962)
- Sue Raney – Breathless (1997), Sue Raney Volume II (2004)
