= Montague Ewing =

British light music composer and arranger

Montague George Ewing (21 May 1890 – 4 March 1957), was a British composer and arranger of light music and ballads. As a composer and lyricist he used his own name and various other pseudonyms, most famously Sherman Myers, but also Rex Avon, Herbert Carrington, Brian Hope and Paul Hoffmann.

Ewing was born in Forest Gate, London and was largely self-taught as a musician. He took various office jobs before the war, while establishing himself as a pianist and accompanist (for instance, accompanying The Jollity Boys in Herne Bay in 1910).

As a composer he achieved an early success with novelty compositions for piano that were quickly adapted for bands and orchestras. One of the first was the One-Step Policeman's Holiday in 1911. It was followed by The Police Patrol and The Burglar's Dream, all of which became popular with marching brass bands and as sheet music, originally published by Phillips & Page. From 1915 to 1919 he served in the London Scottish Regiment.

After the war Ewing adopted the American sounding name Sherman Myers to attract US publishers, achieving a second run of success in the 1920s and early 1930s with pieces such as Moonlight on the Ganges, an evocation of Far Eastern music with words by Chester Wallace. This was a US hit in 1926 for Paul Whiteman. Many other arrangements followed, with the piece becoming a jazz standard in the 1930s. Butterflies in the Rain, described as "a foxtrot intermezzo", with words by Erell Reaves, was recorded by Henry Hall. Other titles include Fairy on the Clock, Soldier on the Shelf and When Lights Are Low in Cairo. Some of his songs were used uncredited in films during the 1930s, such as Grand Hotel (1932), which includes Soldier on the Shelf.

There was an operetta, The Pedlar's Dream, with a text by Margaret Keir and many piano suites with short movements, some for children and educational use. Examples include Silhouettes (Books 1–7, from 1916), Petals: Four Sketches (1919), Fireflies (1921), Mosaics (1921), Love in a Cottage (1923), The Fragrant Year (1925) and Changing Skies (1934). Ewing was also a prolific arranger.

Ewing served in the Home Guard during World War 2. He was married to Doris Anne Thronton and there was one son and one daughter. They lived at Watch Cottage, 3 Friern Watch Avenue in North Finchley. He died in Friern Barnet, aged 67.

== Discography ==
- Butterflies in the Rain on Golden Age of Light Music: The 1930s, Guild, 2004.
- Gazelle. on Golden Age of Light Music: A Second A-Z of Light Music, Guild, 2011
- In Playful Mood, on Golden Age of Light Music: From the Vintage Vaults, Guild, 2011
- Fairy on the Clock, on Golden Age of Light Music: Salon, Light and Novelty, Guild, 2013
