= Eva Puck =

American actress (1892–1979)

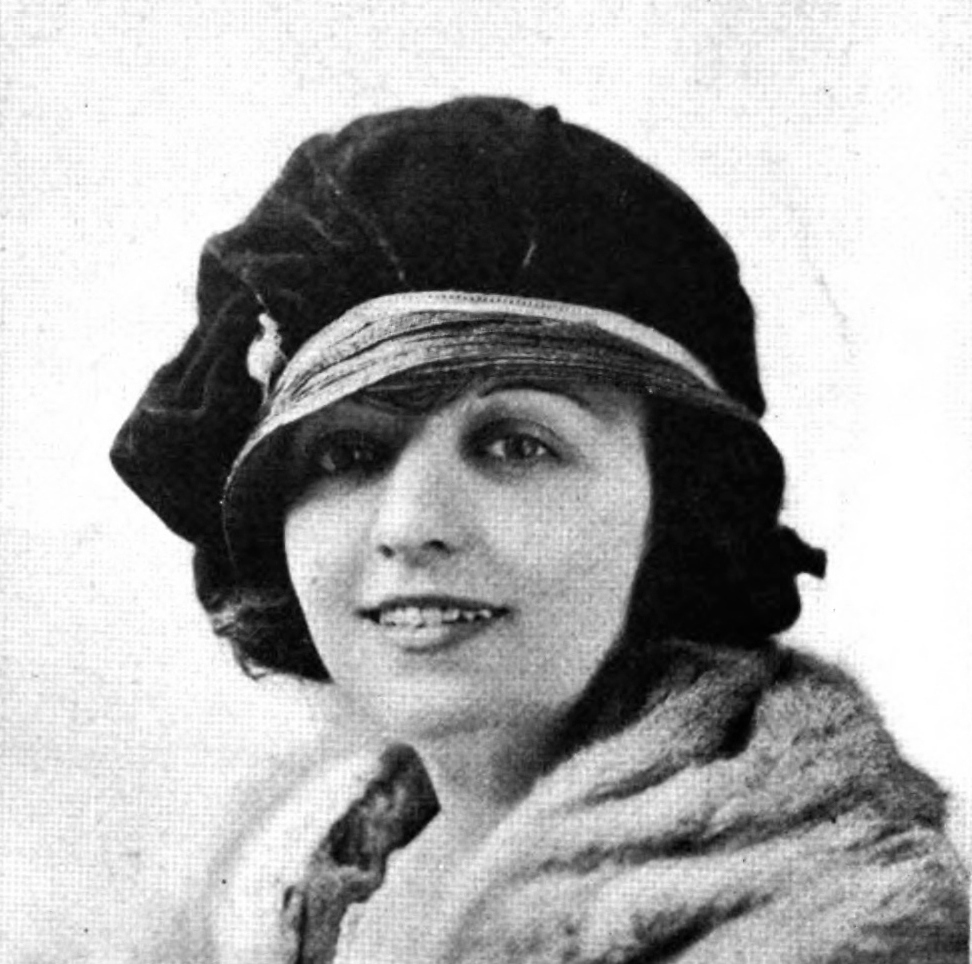
- Born: November 27, 1892; New York City, New York, U.S.
- Died: October 24, 1979 (aged 86); Los Angeles, California, U.S.
- Occupations: Stage, film actress
- Spouse: Sammy White

Eva Puck (November 25, 1892 – October 25, 1979) was an American entertainer, a vaudeville headliner who later found success performing in Broadway musical comedies and film.

== Early life ==
Eva Puck was born on November 25, 1892, in New York City, as the middle of three children, to Abraham and Lena (née Salmon) Puck. There is some question about the family surname being Puck or Salmon, as both were used in early press articles. Little is known of her mother, who came to America from Poland in 1874 or her English father, who immigrated in 1882. By 1899, Eva and her older brother Harry were performing in a vaudeville song and dance act known as the Two Little Pucks.

On May 10, 1903, police raided the Trocadero Music Hall in Manhattan's Fort George district where the Puck children were performing as headliners and arrested their parents and the theater manager, Freeman Bernstein. They were charged with a violation of Section 289 of the Penal Code in unlawfully consenting to the employment, and in the employment, of minors in a theatrical exhibition. The investigators were concerned over the hours that Eva and her brother were keeping and also found the Trocadero an unsuitable environment for children, with patrons smoking and consuming alcohol. The three were later brought to trial in the Court of Special Sessions, and found guilty. The judge, in passing sentence said, in part: "We cannot resist the conviction that these parents have been living largely upon the earnings of these children, which amount from $125 to $150 per month. Now, this sort of business cannot be continued or permitted, and if these defendants come before this Court again the punishment will be more drastic."

Her father was fined $100, or thirty days jail time; and her mother $25, or fifteen days in the City Prison. Bernstein was fined $50.

For the next few years, the Two Little Pucks continued to perform at venues outside New York and later, as they entered their teens, toured as Eva and Harry Puck before disbanding sometime around 1918. Harry went on to be a successful choreographer, composer, songwriter, and music publisher. He was a business partner of lyricist Bert Kalmar and wrote songs with him until Kalmar started his more famous songwriting partnership with composer Harry Ruby. Eva remained in vaudeville, soon teaming up with her future husband, song and dance comedian Sammy White (1894-1960).

Their younger brother, Laurence "Larry" Puck, became a radio and television producer and general manager of Unicorn Productions Inc., a subsidiary of CBS. He later married Mabel Withee, a singer and dancer active on Broadway over the 1920s.

== Career ==
Eva Puck became a member of the vaudeville comedy act Clayton and White that, after Lew Clayton's departure around 1920, became known as Puck and White. One of their popular vaudeville sketches ("Opera vs. Jazz") portrayed White as a scholarly music teacher and Eva as his inept student. The couple married in 1922 and together appeared in Broadway shows such as the Greenwich Village Follies (1923), Rodgers and Hart musical The Girl Friend (1926), and Jerome Kern's Show Boat (1927). Puck also appeared as Helen Cheston in the original Broadway run of the musical Irene from November 1919 to June 1921.

The two played in the original 1927 Broadway stage version of Show Boat. In the musical, White played the role of comic dancer Frank Schultz, and Puck played the role of Ellie May Chipley, who eventually marries Frank. In 1932, the two reprised their roles in the first Broadway revival of the show. However, by the time Universal Pictures released the 1936 film version, the two had divorced, so the role of Ellie went to Queenie Smith, with White repeating his performance as Frank in the film.

Puck and White appeared in a short film made by Lee De Forest in his Phonofilm sound-on-film process, which premiered at the Rivoli Theater in New York City on 15 April 1923. The film shows Puck and White performing their comic routine entitled "Opera vs. Jazz", and is preserved in the Maurice Zouary film collection at the Library of Congress.

In the mid-1930s, Eva Puck married Robert Groves (or Graves), a California merchant, and retired from the stage.

== Family ==
Eva had a daughter, Lauretta (sometimes spelled Laurette) Puck, born in New York in 1912. Nothing is known about Laurette's father except that he was born in Hungary. Laurette appeared in the short Leon Errol film Should Wives Work? (1937) and had previously toured with the Arthur Ashley Players. Laurette later married William R. Golden, a Hollywood executive, and became a nationally known exhibitor and breeder of Irish Setters. A resident of Pacific Palisades, she died after an extended illness on July 17, 1972, predeceasing her mother Eva by seven years.

== Death ==
Eva Puck died in 1979, aged 86, at the Granada Hills Community Hospital in Los Angeles County, California.
