= Sammy White (actor) =

American actor

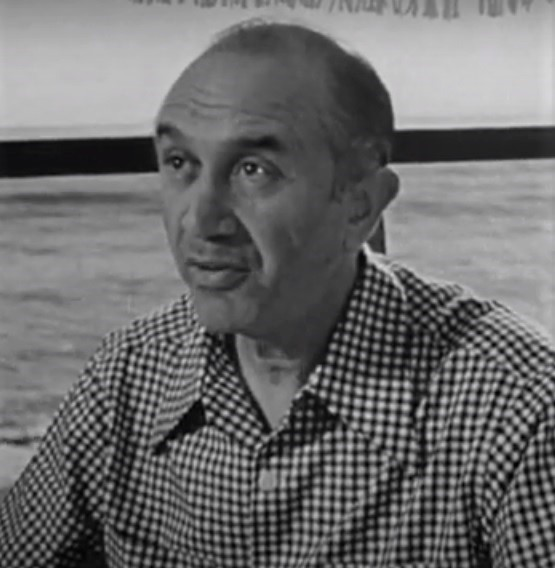
- White in 711 Ocean Drive (1950)
- Born: May 28, 1894; Providence, Rhode Island, U.S.
- Died: March 3, 1960 (aged 65); Beverly Hills, California, U.S.
- Occupation: Actor
- Years active: 1906–1960
- Spouse(s): Eva Puck; Beatrice Curtis

Sammy White (né Samuel Kwait; 28 May 1894 Providence, Rhode Island – 3 March 1960 Beverly Hills, California) was an American vaudeville song-and-dance comedian who appeared in a few films. He appeared with Lew Clayton, as Clayton and White, in the Broadway show Schubert Gaieties of 1919.

== Career ==
With his first wife, Eva Puck, White appeared in vaudeville as Puck and White. They starred in the original Broadway stage version of the classic musical Show Boat (1927). In Show Boat, he played the role of comic dancer Frank Schultz, and Puck played the role of Ellie May Chipley, who eventually marries Frank. In 1932, they reprised their roles in the first Broadway revival of the show. However, by the time the Universal Pictures film version was made in 1936, White and Puck had divorced, so the role of Ellie went to Queenie Smith, with White repeating his performance as Frank in the film.

White later married Broadway actress Beatrice Curtis (1906–1963), the daughter of vaudeville actress Anna Chandler (1884–1957). White repeated his role as Frank in Show Boat yet again in a 1948 New York City Center revival of the show.

He also had a notable supporting role in the Spencer Tracy - Katharine Hepburn film Pat and Mike (1952), as the man to whom Tracy says (when talking about Hepburn), "Not much meat on her, but what there is, is cherce!" White and Puck also appeared in a short film made by Lee De Forest in his Phonofilm sound-on-film process, and premiered at the Rivoli Theater in New York City on 15 April 1923. This film records their comic routine "Opera Vs. Jazz" and is preserved in the Maurice Zouary collection at the Library of Congress.

Incongruously, given his earlier career, White received an "introducing Sammy White" credit for his supporting role as a sympathetic bookie in Joseph M. Newman's classic 1950 film noir, 711 Ocean Drive.

White played himself in the biopic The Helen Morgan Story (1957), the biography of Helen Morgan, the torch singer who originated the role of Julie LaVerne in the original 1927 Broadway production of Show Boat and also played the role in the 1932 revival and 1936 film.
