= Sergio Franchi filmography =

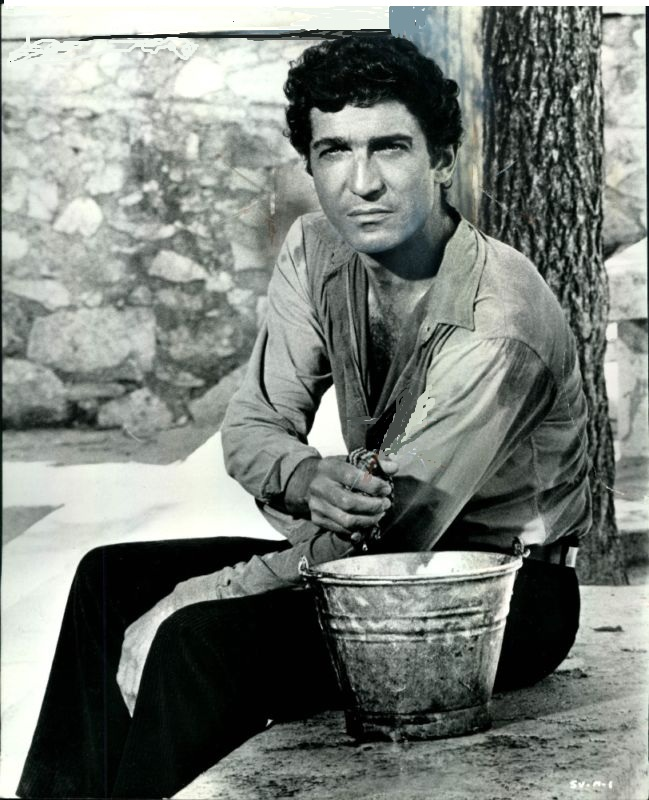
Sergio Franchi in "The Secret of Santa Vittoria"

The following is Sergio Franchi's (April 6, 1926 – May 1, 1990) comprehensive filmography. Regarding his acting roles; these include two musical comedy performance DVDs (also included on his discography), several comedy skits, and the 1983 Tony Awards film. Also included is his 1969 dramatic role as Tufa in The Secret of Santa Vittoria—a film that won the 1970 Golden Globe Award for "Best Motion Picture - Musical/Comedy." All of the sections are listed with earliest dates first. In addition to his extensive television performances (singing, dancing, comedy, and talk shows), there is a section on television commercials, and a section on archived films.

== Feature and television films ==
Year/date	Title	Production information	Performance details
1963	Sing, aber spiel nicht mit mir, DVD ^{Note 1}	Producer, Kurt Nachman	Sergio Franchi, Carmela Corren, Audrey Arno, etc.; Himself - (Sings "Ich finde alle Frauen schön")
3-05-69	The Red Skelton Hour, CBS	"The Kingdom of Iodine"	Sergio Franchi as The Black Night
4-22-69	The Red Skelton Hour, CBS	"You Can Lead a Horse ..."	Sergio Franchi as The Black Knight; Himself - (Sings "L-O-V-E," "Non ti scordar di me")
1969	The Secret of Santa Vittoria, MGM ^{Note 2}	Producer, Stanley Kramer	Sergio Franchi as Tufa; Himself - (sings Soundtrack Title Song "Stay")
1970	Philadelphia, With Love	Producer, Bell Telephone	26 Minute Tourism Promotional Film; Himself - (Sings title song, site appearances)
1970	Three Coins in the Fountain, (TV Movie)	Producer, 20th Century Fox Television	Himself - (sings Soundtrack Title Song)
n.d.	Sergio Franchi on The Ed Sullivan Show, DVD	Producer, Andrew Solt	Himself - (Thirteen songs); Himself - Comedy skits with Stiller and Meara
6-5-83	The 37th Annual Tony Awards ^{Note 3}	Hosts: Richard Burton, Jack Lemmon, Lena Horne	Himself - Presenter

=== Notes ===
1. This DVD was part of a German TV serial, "Music Is in the Air" filmed at the Vienna music show "Rendezvous in Vienna."

2. Film was nominated for 1970 Academy Awards: Best Original Score, Best Film Editing Distributed by United Artists, © MGM 1969.

- Nominated 1970 Golden Globes: Best Director (Stanley Kramer), Best Actor (Anthony Quinn), Best Actress (Anna Magnani), Best Original Score (Ernest Gold), Best Original Song "Stay"
- Won 1970 Golden Globe: Best Motion Picture - Comedy!
- The film and its major stars were referenced nine separate weeks on Mr. Pop Culture

3. "The 37th Annual Tony Awards" was broadcast live from New York City's Uris Theater. The theme for the Awards show was "A Tribute to George and Ira Gershwin."

== Musical variety television specials ==
Year/date	Title	Information	Details
1-02-64	Victor Borge at Carnegie Hall, ABC	Featuring Victor Borge, Sergio Franchi, Leonid Hambro	Himself - ("It's Now or Never" comedy sketch w/Victor Borge}; Himself - (sings "Mimi" accompanied with 3 pianos & chorus), "Ay, Ay Maria" accompanied by his guitar, & "Yours is My Heart Alone."
2-14-64	The Bob Hope Comedy Special,	Featuring Sergio Franchi, Anne Bancroft, Janet Leigh, Julie London	Bob Hope & Sergio Franchi comedy sketch: Two rival opera stars crash on Hollywood Freeway; Himself - (sings "Marta")
6-04-64	Texaco Star Parade, CBS; Meredith Willson Variety Show	First of three Meredith Willson specials; Featuring Meredith Willson, Rini Willson, Sergio Franchi, Caterina Valente	Himself - (sings "Stella by Starlight", sings & dances to "Chicago" in Italian, &sings "Seventy-six Trombones" (with Rini Willson, & Caterina Valente), backed by four military bands^{Note 1}; Sings and dances in duet with Caterina Valente, "To Be A Performer"
1-2-66	March of Dimes Telethon, CBS	Featuring Sergio Franchi, Allen & Rossi, Walter Matthau, Dina Merrill, Julius LaRosa	Himself - (sings songs from repertoire)
8-18-67	Centennial International, CBC.; 1. Mediterranean Nations	Celebrating The Canadian Centennial; Series of four specials	Starring Sergio Franchi (representing Italy); Ivan Romanoff Orchestra & Chorus
April, 1967	13 Stars For Channel 13, WNDT	Annual Fund-Raiser	Tony Randall hosts Itzhak Perlman, Shirley Verrett, etc.; Himself - (Singing songs from repertoire)
12-05-70	Miss Teenage America Pageant	From Ft. Worth, Texas	Himself - (sings "Love is All"); Texas A&M Singing Cadets (Annual Appearances)
1972	Easter Seals (U.S.) Telethon	From Las Vegas,^{Note 2} Monty Hall as MC	Himself - (songs from repertoire)
6-03-74	6th Annual Lions Sight and Hearing Telethon, WGNO	Benefit Lions Eye Foundation Medical Center, New Orleans, LA	Himself - featured performer; Also featuring Frank Sinatra Jr., Willie Mays, Hank Aaron, Mickey Mantle
2-11-81	Musical Comedy Tonight - II, PBS; (Three Episodes win Peabody Award)	Producer, Sylvia Fine Kaye; This episode featured 4 Broadway musicals	Franchi & Bonnie Franklin sing scenes from South Pacific; Himself - sings "Some Enchanted Evening"
3-20-82	All-Time American Songbook, WNDT	Channel 13 Festival 100,000^{Note 3}	Dinah Shore hosts Melba Moore, Sergio Franchi, Bobby Short etc.; Himself - (singing American pop standards)

=== Notes ===
1. The military marching bands were composed of 500 California high school band members led by Willson in the production number.
2. Telecast from the enormous Convention Hall in the Las Vegas Sahara Hotel
3. All-Time American Songbook was a 3-hour special filmed live at the Grand Ballroom of the New York Statler Hotel. It featured songs intrinsic to American pop culture during period 1900–1950. Straight-up vocal performances..no production numbers. The show included works by George Gershwin, Irving Berlin, Hoagy Carmichael, Cole Porter, Fats Waller and Duke Ellington. The special also featured historical film clips of the songwriters performing their own works.

== Television show appearances ==
=== London, England ===
- 1960 - Startime, ATV - Himself - (sings "Our Concerto")
- 1962 - Startime, ATV - Himself, appears with Susan Lane
- 1962 - Sunday Night at the London Palladium, ATV - Himself - (sings opera arias)
- 1962 - Sunday Night at the London Palladium, ATV - Himself - (sings "And This Is My Beloved," & "Core 'ngrato")

=== American Television ===
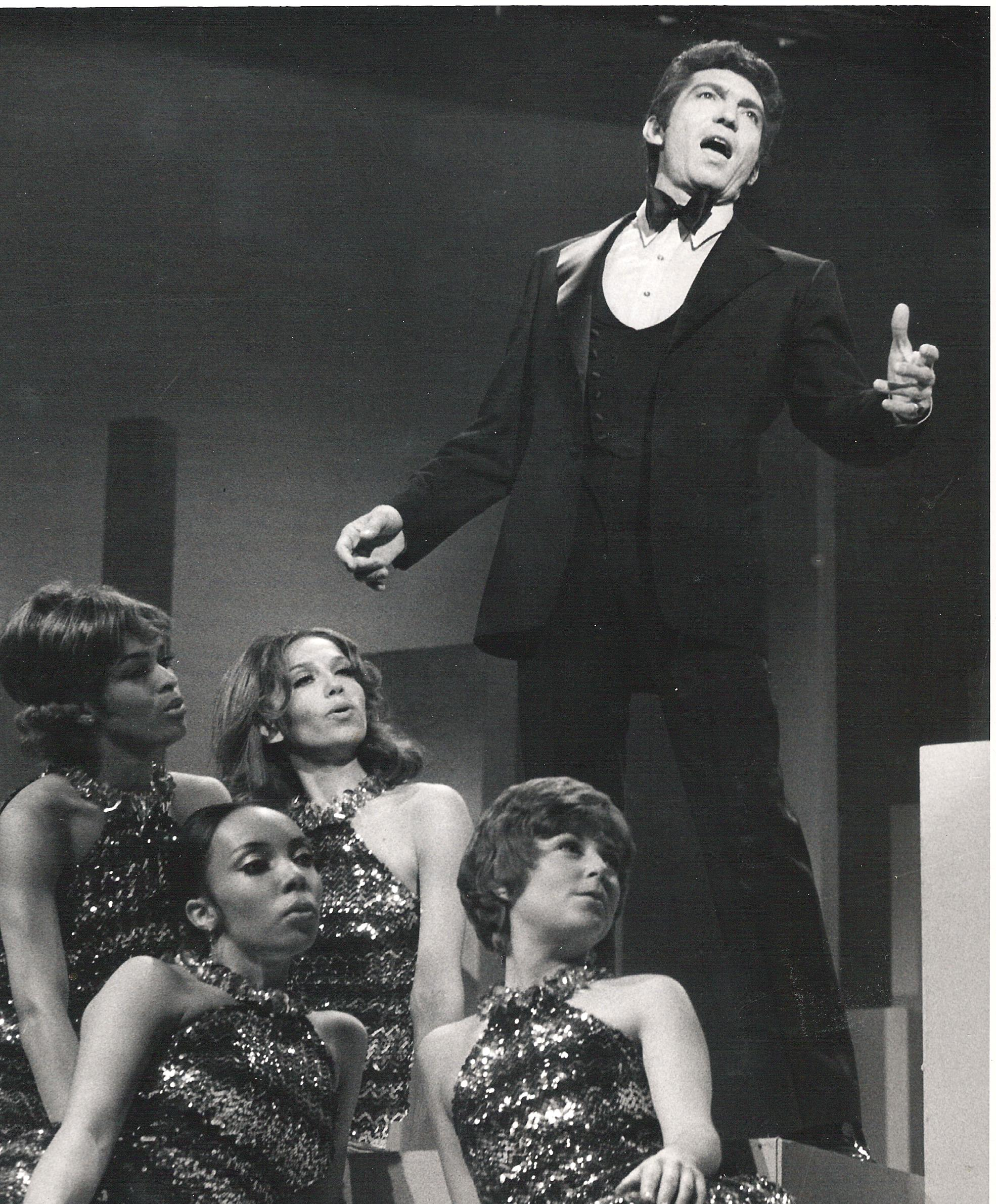
Sergio Franchi sings "Love is All" on The Ed Sullivan Show, 1970

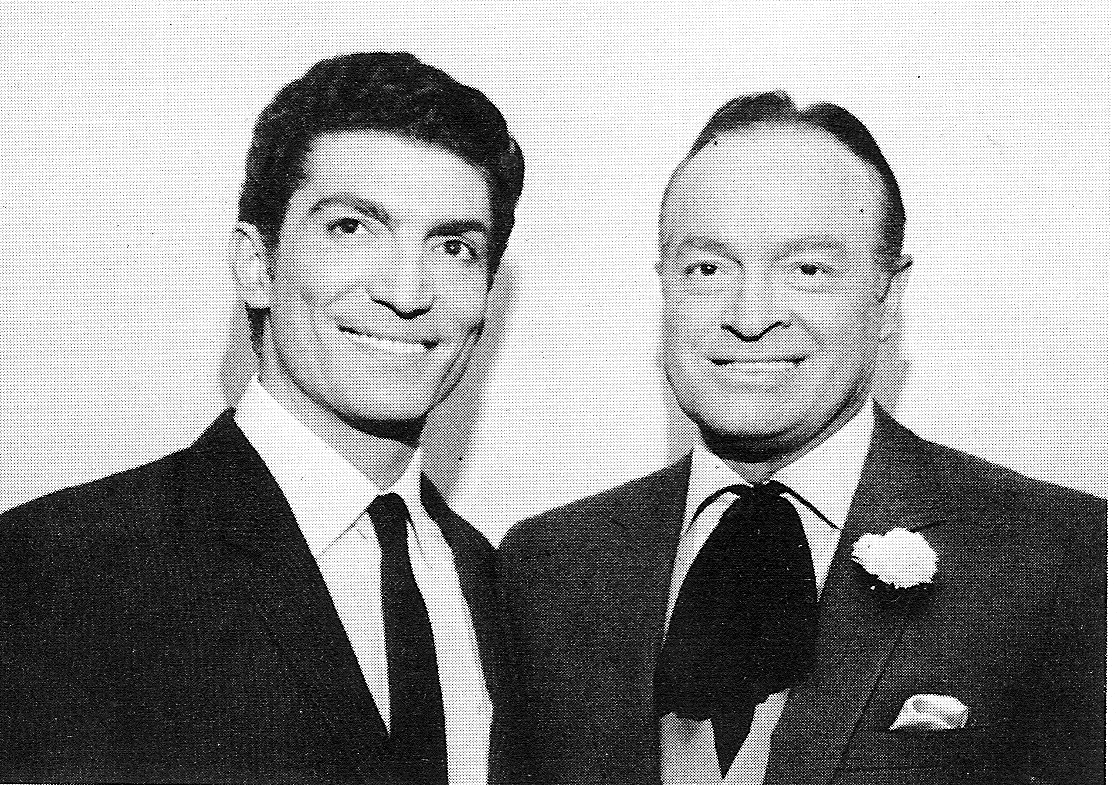
Sergio Franchi on Bob Hope Comedy Special, 1964

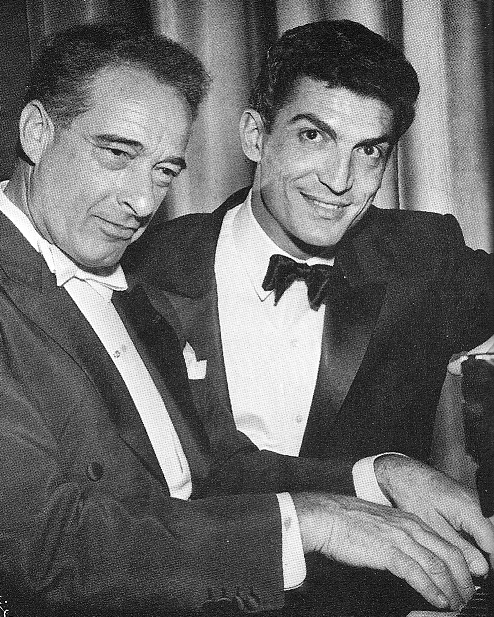
Victor Borge & Sergio Franchi, 1964

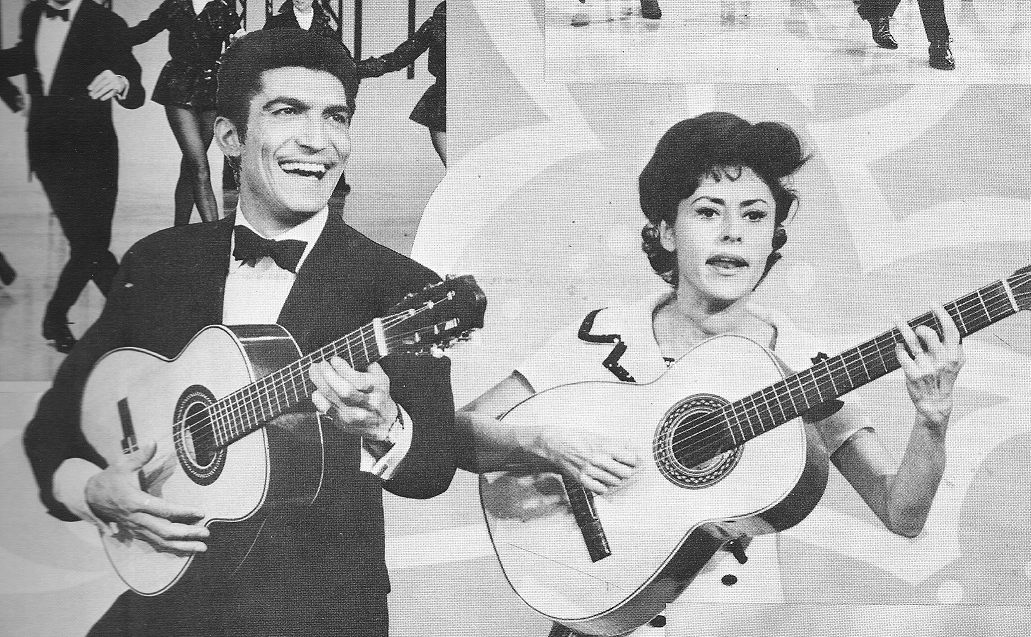
Sergio Franchi & Caterina Valente Sing & Dance on Meredith Willson Show, 1964

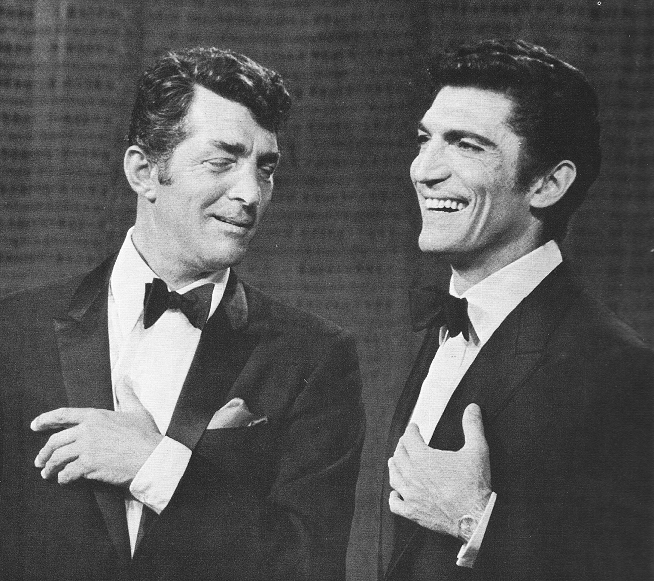
Sergio Franchi on Dean Martin Show, 1966

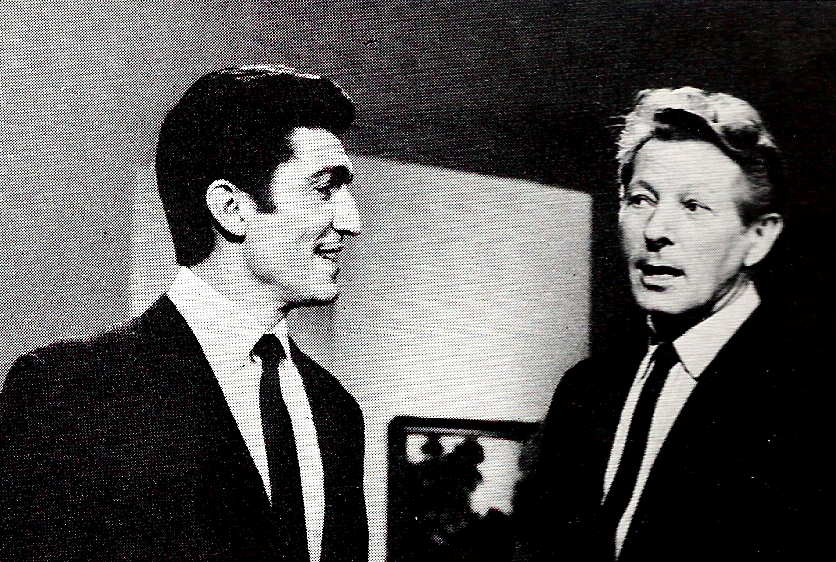
Sergio Franchi on Danny Kaye Show, 1966

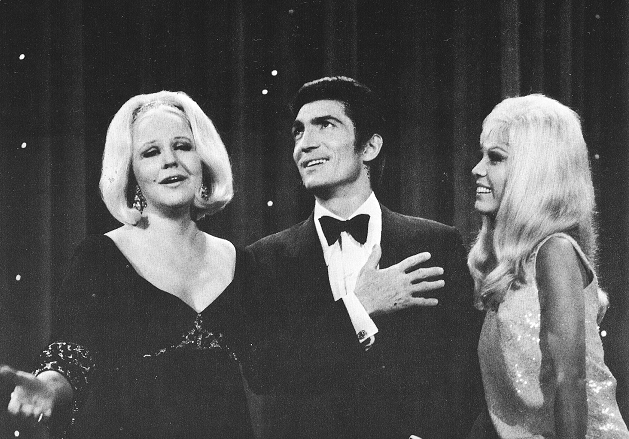
Peggy Lee, Sergio Franchi, & Nancy Sinatra on Ed Sullivan Show, 1967

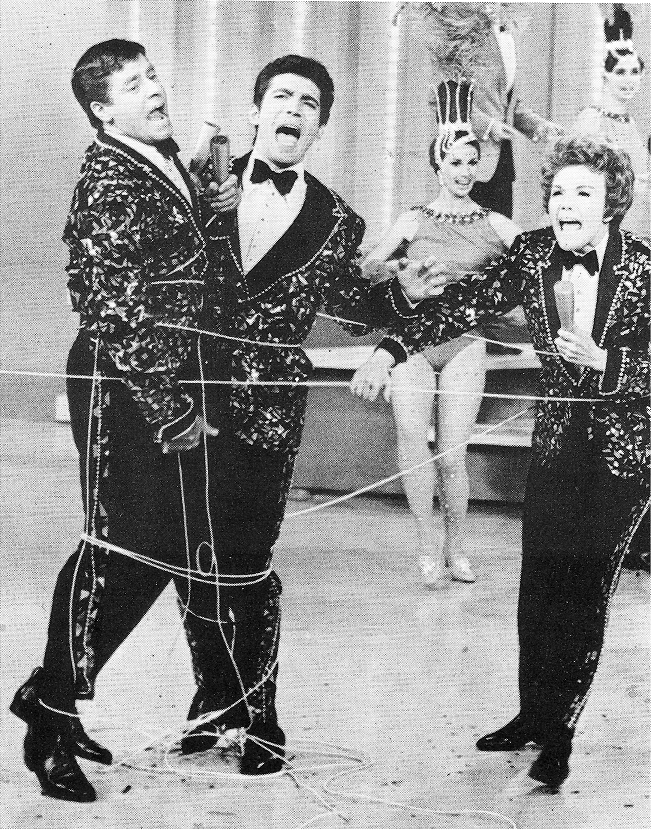
Jerry Lewis Clowning Around with Sergio Franchi & Nanette Fabray, 1968

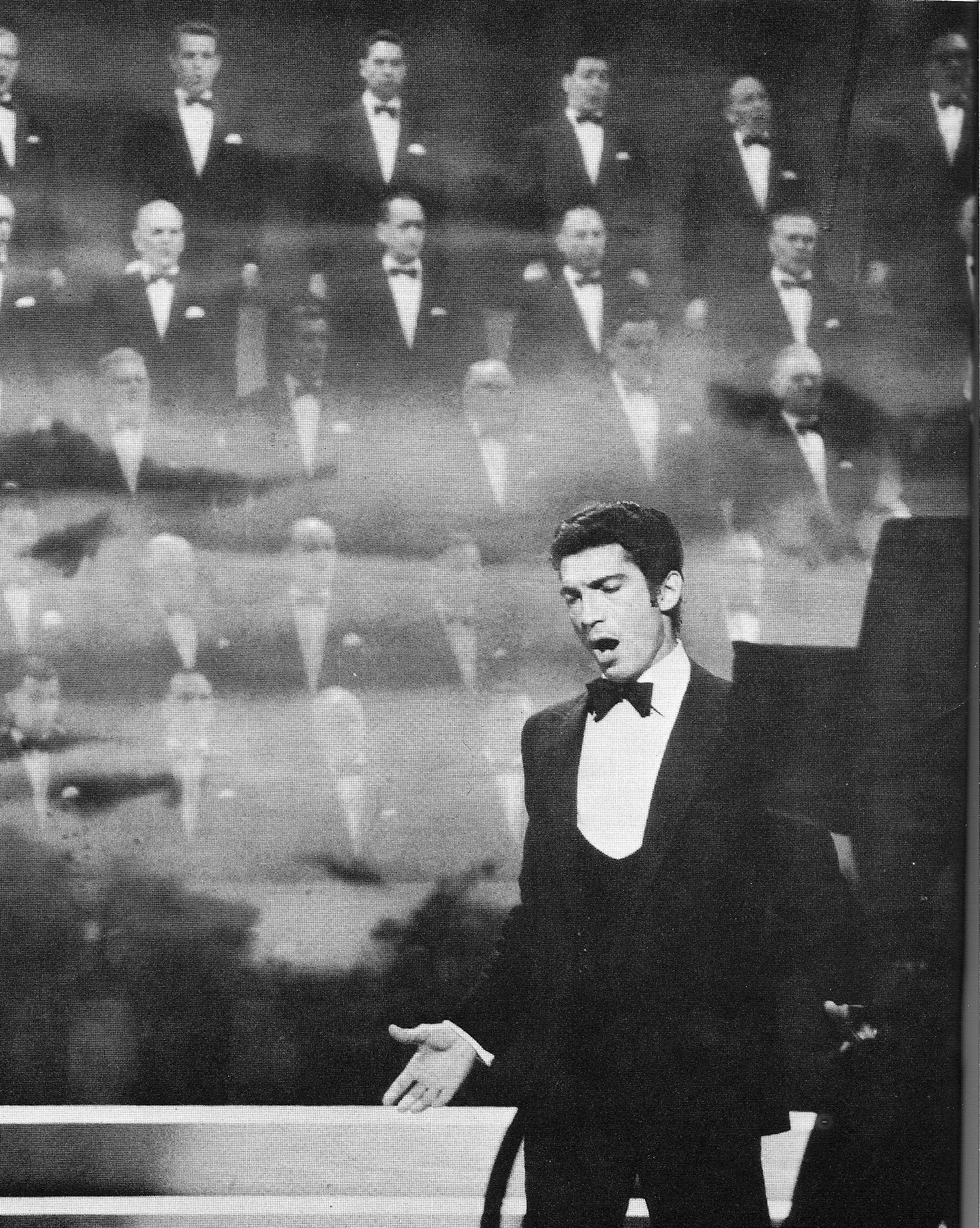
Sergio Franchi sings "You'll Never Walk Alone" with Welsh Choir on Ed Sullivan Show, 1968

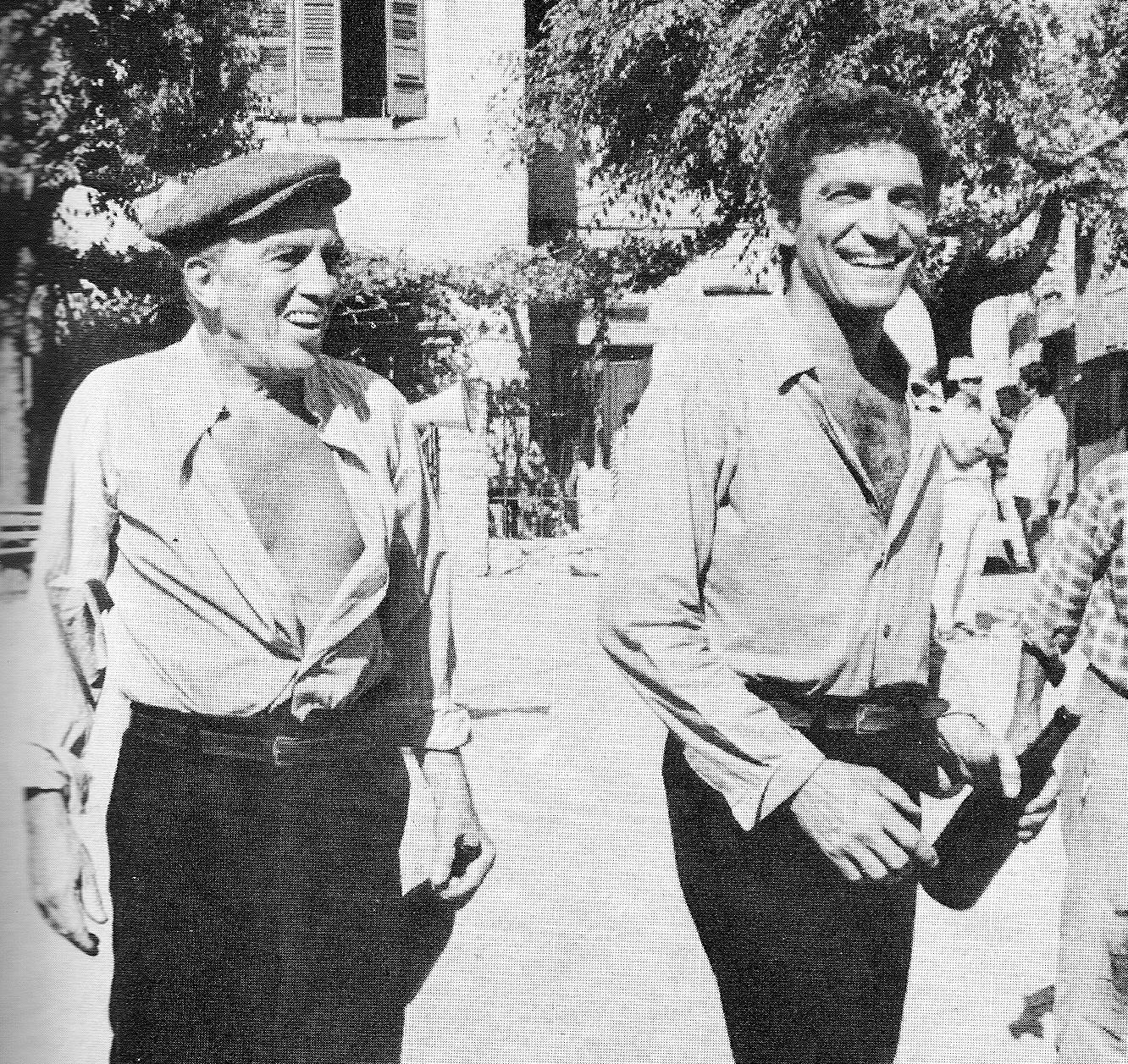
Ed Sullivan & Sergio Franchi having fun on the set of Santa Vittoria in Italy, 1968

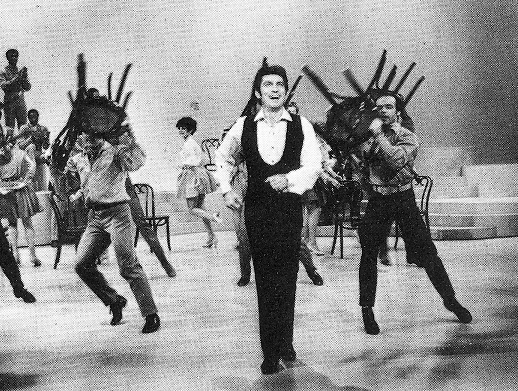
Sergio Franchi sings Fiddler on Roof medley on Ed Sullivan Show, 1969

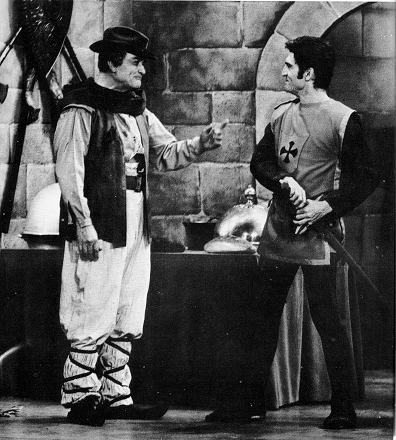
Sergio Franchi as Black Knight on Red Skelton Show, 1969

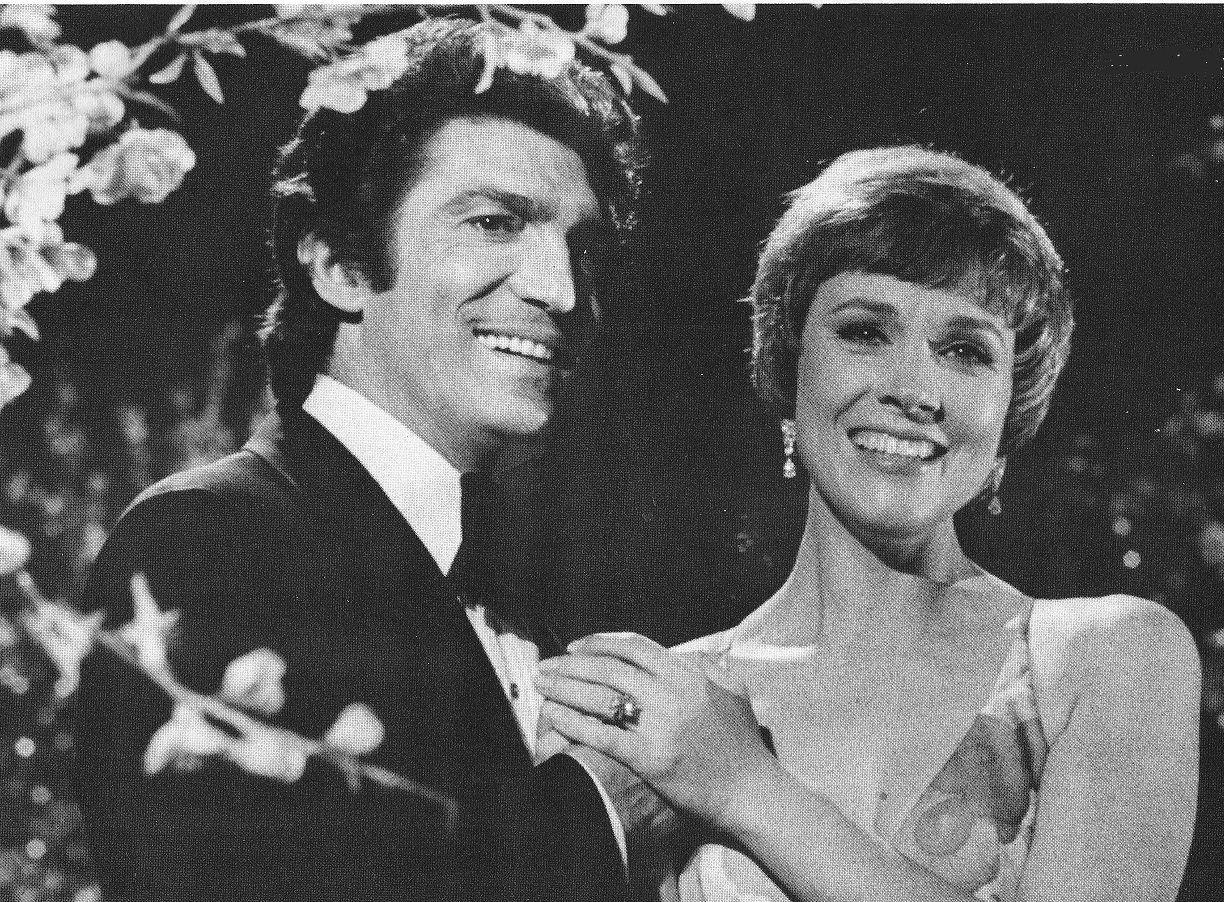
Sergio Franchi on Julie Andrews Show, 1973

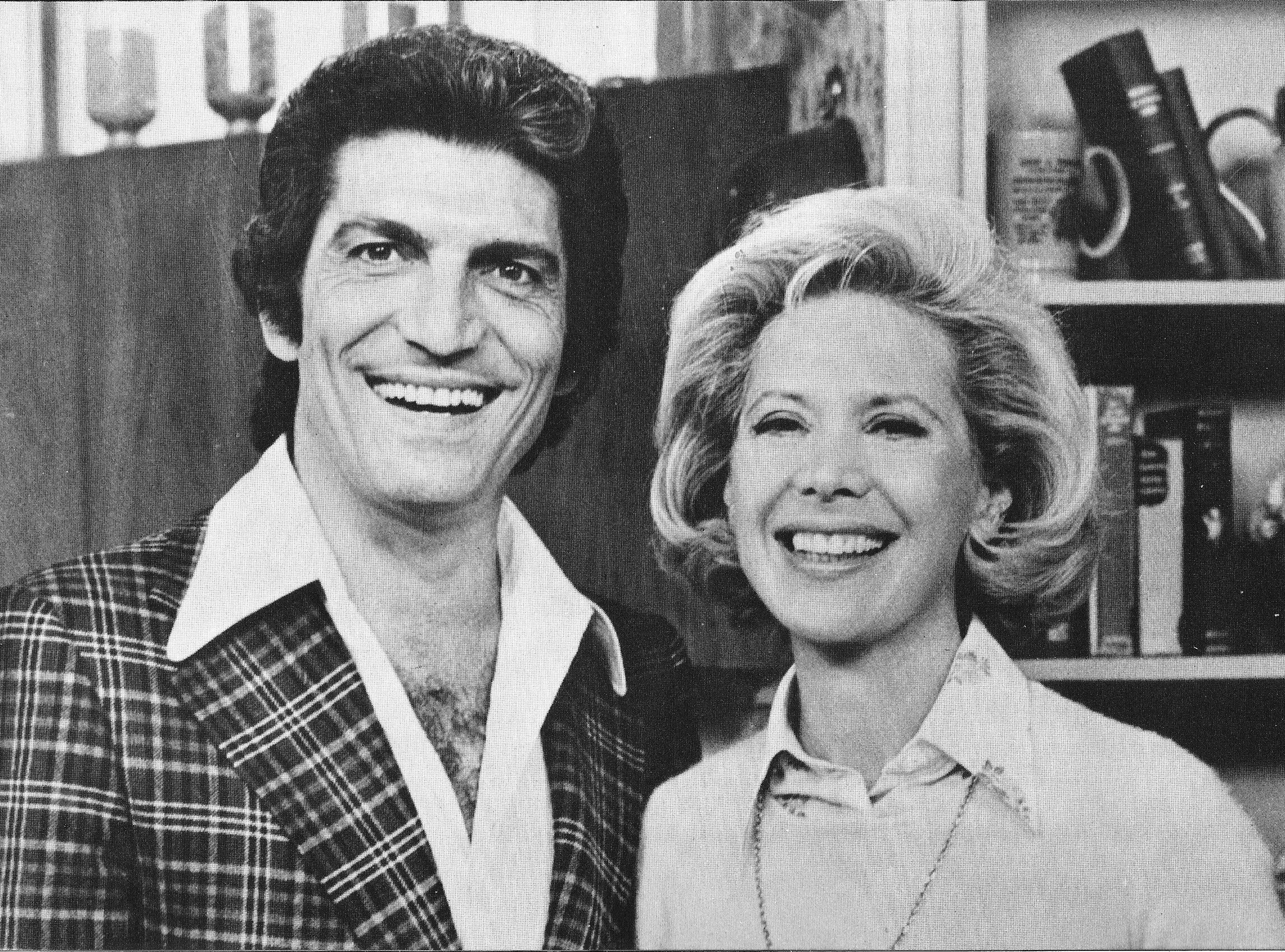
Sergio Franchi & Dinah Shore, Dinah's Place, 1973

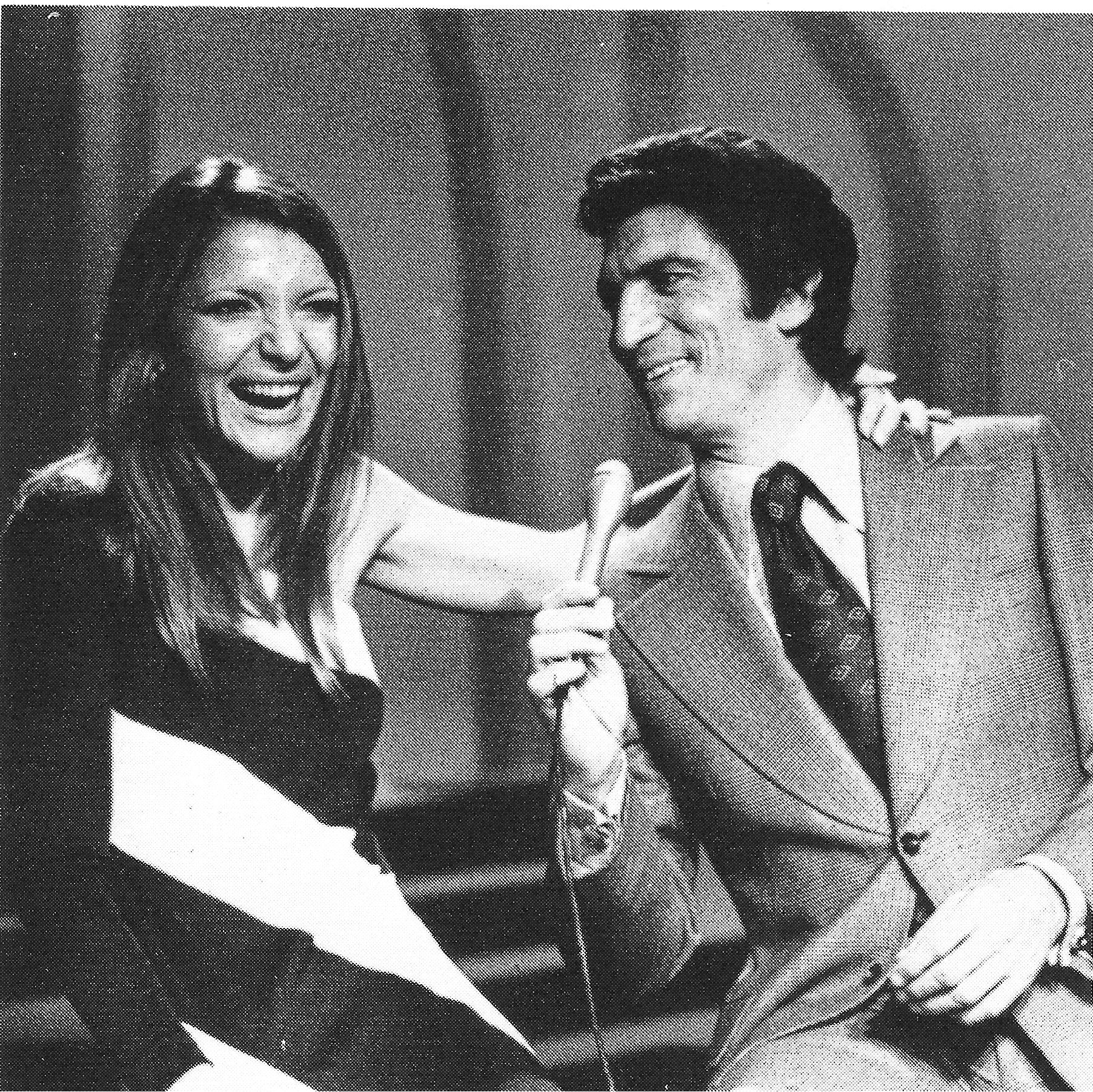
Sergio Franchi with sister, Dana Valery on Mike Douglas Show, 1-15-74

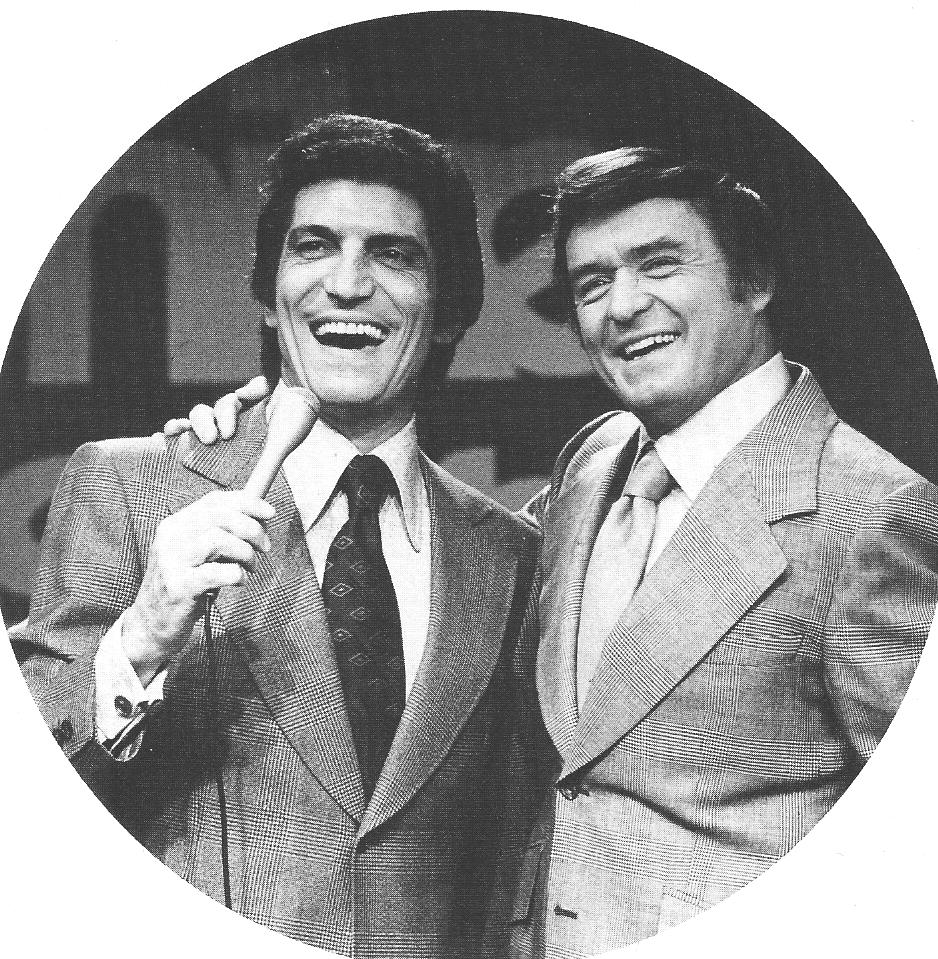
Sergio Franchi Co-Hosts on Mike Douglas Show, 1974

Selected Sergio Franchi Television Appearances
- 1962 - The Ed Sullivan Show, CBS:

- Episode dated 10-14-62 - Himself - (sings "Core 'ngrato")
- Episode dated 10-28-62 - Himself - (sings "Funiculi, Funicula," & "What Kind of Fool Am I"

- 1963 - The Ed Sullivan Show, CBS:

- Episode dated 1-19-63 - Himself - (sings "And This Is My Beloved," & "Marechiare")
- Episode dated 5-26-63 - Himself - (sings "'O Surdato 'Nnamurato")

- 1964 - The Hollywood Palace, ABC^{Note 1}

- Host: George Burns, Episode dated 3-28-64 - Himself - (sings "Summertime in Venice"

Himself - (Tap dances and duets w/George Burns to "Some of These Days")

- Host: Donald O'Connor, Episode dated 10-10-64 - Himself - (sings "More," & "Core 'ngrato")
- Host: Van Johnson, Episode dated 12-23-64 - Himself - (sings "In The Still of The Night," & "Al Di La")

The Jack Paar Show, NBC - Episode dated 4-24-64 - Himself - (sings "Chicago" in Italian)

- 1965 - The Ed Sullivan Show, CBS:

- Episode dated 3-28-65 - Himself - (sings "Stella by Starlight"). From Broadway's "Do I Hear a Waltz?," co-star Elizabeth Allen sings title song; Franchi sings "Take The Moment."
- Episode dated 12-29-65 - Himself - (sings "The Lord's Prayer," medley of "Mimi"/"Maria"/"Everything")

American Musical Theatre, (TV Series) WCBS - Episode dated 4-24-65 - Himself - Host Earl Wrightson interviews Richard Rodgers, Elizabeth Allen, and Franchi re musical Do I Hear a Waltz? Allen and Franchi sing songs from the Broadway show.
The Merv Griffin Show, WNEW - Episode dated 5-11-65
Fanfare (1965)(TV Series) CBS - Episode 9 dated 8-21-65 - Himself - (sings "It Only Takes a Moment," "Chicago" in Italian, & "Take the Moment")

- 1966 - The Ed Sullivan Show, CBS:

- Episode dated 10-16-66 - Himself - (sings "Core 'ngrato;" duet with the Kessler Twins, "The Shadow of Your Smile")

The Hollywood Palace, ABC^{Note 1}

- Host: Phil Harris, Episode dated 1-15-66 - Himself - (sings Italian version of "Hello, Dolly!")
- Host: Phil Silvers, Episode dated 9-24-66 - Himself - (sings "The Impossible Dream," & "Volare")

The Sammy Davis Jr. Show, NBC - Episode dates 4-14-66 - Himself - (sings "Be My Love," & "This Dream.")
The Mike Douglas Show, CBS:

- Episode dated 5-11-66
- Episode dated 6-29-66
- Co-Host week of 12-26-66 through 12-30-66

The Merv Griffin Show, WNEW - Episode dated 6-14-66
The Danny Kaye Show, CBS - Show aired 12-14-66 - Himself - (sings; plays comedy sketch with Danny about odd opera lyrics)
The Dean Martin Show, NBC - Episode dated 12-29-66 - Himself - (sings "C'est Magnifique," & "Climb Every Mountain")

- n.d. - What's My Line? - Unknown date - Himself - Mystery Guest
- 1967 - The Ed Sullivan Show, CBS:

- Episode dated 3-05-67 - Himself - Audience Bow
- Episode dated 3-26-67
- Episode dated 10-01-67 - Himself - (sings "Time Alone Will Tell," & "By Myself")(Medley of 5 songs with Peggy Lee & Nancy Sinatra)

The Joey Bishop Show (talk show), ABC - Episode dated 5-01-67
Gypsy Rose Lee (Morning Talk Show) KGO-TV - Episode dated July 4, 1967 - Himself - Discusses his background
The Hollywood Palace, ABC^{Note 1}

- Host: Sid Caesar, Episode dated 11-07-67 - Himself - (sings "The Girl From Ipanema," & "I Should Care")

The Mike Douglas Show, CBS - Episode dated 11-20-67

- 1968 - The Jerry Lewis Show - Episode dated 1-02-68 - Comedy sketch with Jerry Lewis & Nanette Fabray)

Himself - (sings "Time Alone Will Tell," & "The Daughter of Rosie O'Grady")

The Ed Sullivan Show, CBS:

- Episode dated 2-04-68 - Himself - (sings "And This Is My Beloved," "Till There Was You," & "Younger Than Springtime")
- Episode dated 3-03-68
- Episode dated 4-14-68 - Himself - (sings "Hatikvah")
- Episode dated 6-09-68 - Himself - (sings "You'll Never Walk Alone" with Welsh Choir)
- Episode dated 9-29-68 - Film of Ed on location in Italy interviewing Sergio Franchi & Virna Lisi during the filming of The Secret of Santa Vittoria

The Hollywood Palace, ABC

- Hosts: Jimmy Durante / The Temptations, Episode dated 2-17-68 - Himself - (no program available)

- 1969 - The Hollywood Palace, ABC^{Note 1}

- Host: Jimmy Durante, Episode dated 1-11-69 - Himself - (duet w/Jimmy Durante,"E, Compari"); Himself - (sings "E lucevan le stelle" from Tosca, sings & dances to "Alexander's Ragtime Band")

The Ed Sullivan Show, CBS:

- Episode dated 2-02-69 - Himself - (sings "Hava Nagila," & "If I Were a Rich Man")
- Episode dated 8-17-69 - Himself - (sings "Love Finds the Way," "A Man Without Love," "Noche de Ronde,"

"Serenata," & "For Once in My Life")

- Episode dated 11-30-69 - Himself - (sings "Granada," & "The Song of Santa Vittoria (Stay)")

Ed shows filmed scene of Ed & Sergio passing wine bottles w/villagers in "Santa Vittoria"

The Mike Douglas Show, CBS:

- Episode dated 2-14-69
- Co-Host week of 5-26-69 through 5-30-69

The Tonight Show Starring Johnny Carson, NBC:

- Episode dated 4-08-69
- Episode dated 6-29-69
- Episode dated 9-22-69

The Joey Bishop Show (talk show), ABC:

- Episode dated 3-11-69
- Episode dated 10-20-69 - Coverage of World Premiere of "Santa Vittoria" - Himself - Interviewed at premiere
- Episode dated 11-04-69

Profiles, Larry King(TV Series) - Episode dated 1969 - Himself - Interviewed about life and career.
That Show, Joan Rivers ^{Note 2} - Episode Dated 10-18-69

- 1970 - The Ed Sullivan Show, CBS"

- Episode dated 2-01-70 - Himself - (sings "To Give," & "Noche de Ronde" w/guitar)
- Episode date 4-12-70 - Himself - (sings "More Than Strangers," & "L-O-V-E")
- Episode dated 5-24-70 - Himself - (sings "Love is All," & "Al Di La")

Ed introduces Yvonne Franchi, who takes audience bow)

- Episode dated 6-14-70 - Himself - (sings "Didn't We?" "With a Little Help From My Friends")

Comedy sketches with Stiller and Meara

The Hollywood Palace, ABC^{Note 1}

- Host: Bing Crosby, Episode dated 1-03-70 - Himself (sings "The Song of Santa Vittoria (Stay)," & "To Give;"

Himself- duet w/Mary Costa.. "True Love"); Group sing medley of Bing Crosby hits

The David Frost Show

- Episode dated 2-19-70
- Episode dated 10-20-70

Della, Della Reese (talk show), Episode dated 1-27-1970
The Tonight Show Starring Johnny Carson, NBC - Episode dated 3-09-70
The Merv Griffin Show, WNEW - Episode dated 3-29-70
The Tonight Show Starring Johnny Carson, NBC - Episode dated 7-16-70
The Mike Douglas Show, CBS - Episode dated 7-17-70
The Real Tom Kennedy Show (1970) - Episode dated 9-6-70
The Linkletter Show - (Art Linkletter Series 1952-1970) - Episode dated 9-15-70 - Himself (with Dana Valery)
The Dick Cavett Show - Episode dated 10-06-70

- 1971 - The Ed Sullivan Show, CBS:

- Episode dated 1-03-71 - Himself - (sings medley of "Jean"/"Just Say I Love Her;" medley of "Mi Quando"/"All of My Life")
- Episode dated 1-24-71 - Himself - (sings "Close to You;" & "No Man is an Island" w/Texas A&M Singing Cadets)

The Tonight Show Starring Johnny Carson, NBC:

- Episode dated 4-08-71
- Episode dated 5-10-71
- Episode dated 7-16-71

The David Frost Show - Episode dated 5-12-71
The Mike Douglas Show, CBS:

- Episode dated 5-31-71
- Episode dated 11-26-71

The Merv Griffin Show, WNEW:

- Episode dated 6-17-71
- Episode dated 11-2-71

- 1972 - The David Frost Show

- Episode dated 3-15-72
- Episode dated 7-16-72

The Mike Douglas Show, CBS:

- Episode dated 2-07-72
- Episode dated 12-04-72

The Tonight Show Starring Johnny Carson, NBC - Episode dated 6-22-72
Saturday Variety - Episode dated 7-08-72
The Merv Griffin Show, WNEW:

- Episode dated 11-13-72 (From Las Vegas)
- Episode dated 12-10-72 (International Music Theme)

The Julie Andrews Hour, ABC - Episode dated 12-20-72 (Christmas Special)

- 1973 - The Julie Andrews Hour, ABC - Episode dated 2-17-73

Himself - (Godfather medley: "Speak Softly Love" & "I Have But One Heart";); and "Ol' Man River;"
Duet with Julie Andrews, "My Heart at Thy Sweet Voice;"
Duet with Julie Andrews, medley of "The Song is You"/"The Way You Look Tonight.")

Jack Paar Tonite ^{Note 3} ABC:

- Episode dated 4-04-73
- Episode dated 9-19-73

Dinah's Place - Episode dated 4-24-73
The Mike Douglas Show, CBS:

- Episode dated 8-17-73
- Episode dated 8-31-73

The Merv Griffin Show, WNEW - Episode dated 5-27-73

- 1974 - The Mike Douglas Show, CBS:

- Co-Hosts week of 1-14-74 through 1-18-74
- Episode dated 4-16-74
- Episode dated 7-26-74
- Episode dated 12-27-74

The Merv Griffin Show, WNEW:

- Episode dated 5-12-74
- Episode dated 5-31-74 (From Las Vegas)
- Episode dated 12-25-74 (From Las Vegas)

- 1975 - The Merv Griffin Show, WNEW - Episode dated 4-06-75
- 1976 - Dinah! (Dinah Shore talk show) - Episode dated 5-13-76 (From Las Vegas) - Himself - (sings "Nel Blu di Pinto di Blu,"

& "What I Did For Love")

The Mike Douglas Show, CBS:

- Co-Hosts week of 6-21-76 through 6-25-76 - Himself - (sings "Let Me Try Again")
- Episode dated 9-02-76 - Himself - (sings "I Only Have Eyes For You")
- Episode dated 11-24-76

The Merv Griffin Show, WNEW - Episode dated 4-07-76

- 1977 - 26th Annual Columbus Day Parade - Event Dated 10-10-77 – himself – grand marshal ^{Note 4}
- 1978 - The Mike Douglas Show, CBS - Episode dated 3-28-78

The Merv Griffin Show, WNEW:

- Episode dated 5-07-78 (From Las Vegas)
- Episode dated 10-08-78
- Episode dated 12-17-78

- 1979 - The Merv Griffin Show, WNEW - Episode dated 6-08-79 (From Las Vegas)
- 1981 - Tomorrow (TV series) with Tom Snyder - Episode dated 1-27-81 - Himself - (sings medley of songs with Dana Valery)
- 1984 - The Merv Griffin Show, WNEW - Episode dated 5-27-84
- 1985 - The Merv Griffin Show, KTTV - Episode dated 11-6-85
- 1987 - NBC Today Show - Episode dated 5-05-87 - Himself w/Juliet Prowse discuss their up-coming show at Westbury Music Fair.
- 1988 - Live! with Regis and Kathie Lee, WABC - Episode dated 12-4-88
- 1989 - Live! with Regis and Kathie Lee, WABC - Episode dated 7-4-89 - (Independence Day festivities in NY Harbor aboard the New York Princess)

=== Notes ===
1. Eight of the nine episodes of "The Hollywood Palace" in which Sergio Franchi appeared have been digitalized and sold as DVDs in the past. It is unknown if the 2-17-68 episode co-hosted by Jimmy Durante & The Temptations was digitalized. His appearance was verified by a photograph with The Temptations. These video episodes are hard to find today, but constitute a valuable visual resource for Franchi performances.

2. Commonly referred to as "The Joan Rivers Show" during its airing dates, this was her (1968–1969) syndicated daytime talk show. Franchi's appearance on this show was prior to their successful concert appearances together in Chicago (1970) and Las Vegas (1974–1976).

3. The "Jack Paar Tonite Show" was part of "ABC Wide World of Entertainment," and monthly segments lasted one-and-half hours.

4. Broadcast live from New York City Channel 11 - Joe Caputo, commentator

== Television commercials ==
- 1976 — Chrysler Corporation — Franchi was chosen to be the TV spokesperson for the introduction of their Plymouth Volare.
- 1976 — Hills Brothers Coffee — Franchi was hired as "the man from Italy" to promote their European coffees on television.

== Archived films ==
- 1957 - Giacomo Puccini's Madama Butterfly - Film Archives of South African Broadcasting Corporation (SABC)

Produced by Alessandro Rota
Jerome Schulman conductiong SABC Orchestra
Sergio Franci Galli, Bob Borowsky, Nellie du Toit, Rita Roberts

- 1963 - Producers Library Service

Himself - 1963 Coconut Grove Debut w/Juliet Prowse (no audio)

- 1969 - Historic Films Archive (Excluding Ed Sullivan Collection)

Himself - (sings "A Man Without Love")
Himself - Interview (no details)
Himself - (sings "Senorita")
Himself - (sings "The Impossible Dream")
Himself - (sings "To Life" from Fiddler on the Roof)

- 1974 - Historic Films Archive

* Himself - (sings "Love Is All" - live)
* Himself - (sings "A Woman in Love" - live)
* Himself - (interviews fan from audience)
* Himself - (sings "Speak Softly Love," theme from The Godfather - live)
* Himself - (sings "I Have But One Heart" - live)
