= Love Me Tonight =

1932 film by Rouben Mamoulian

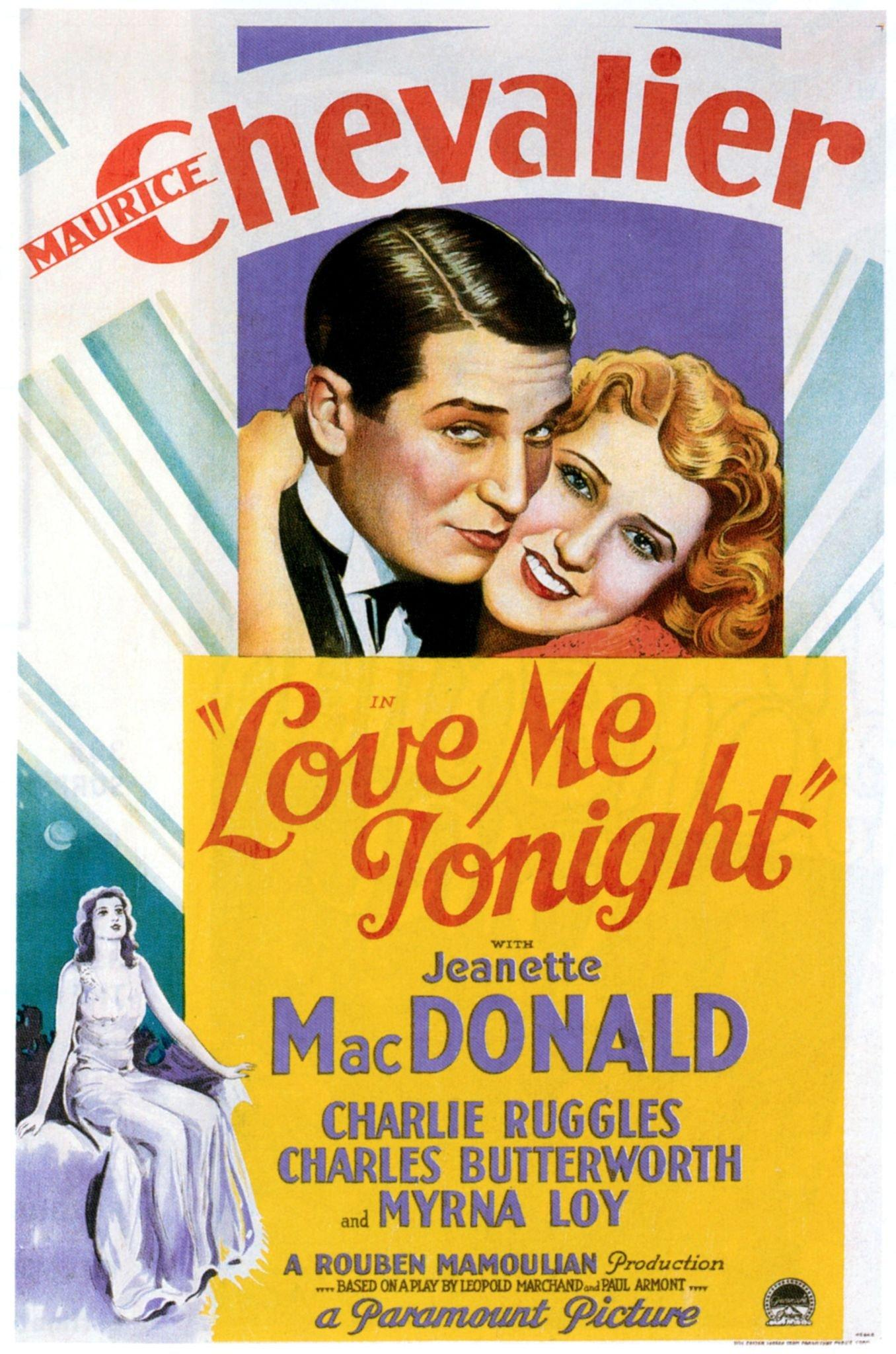
- Theatrical release poster
- Directed by: Rouben Mamoulian
- Screenplay by: Samuel Hoffenstein; George Marion Jr. Waldemar Young
- Based on: Le Tailleur au Château; 1924 play by Léopold Marchand; Paul Armont
- Produced by: Rouben Mamoulian
- Starring: Maurice Chevalier; Jeanette MacDonald; Charles Ruggles; Charles Butterworth; Myrna Loy
- Cinematography: Victor Milner
- Edited by: Rouben Mamoulian; William Shea
- Music by: Richard Rodgers (music); Lorenz Hart (lyrics)
- Distributed by: Paramount Pictures
- Release date: August 18, 1932
- Running time: 89 minutes
- Country: United States
- Language: English
- Box office: $685,000 (U.S. and Canada rentals)

Love Me Tonight is a 1932 American pre-Code musical comedy film produced and directed by Rouben Mamoulian, with music by Rodgers and Hart. It stars Maurice Chevalier as a tailor who poses as a nobleman and Jeanette MacDonald as a princess with whom he falls in love. It also stars Charles Ruggles as a penniless nobleman, along with Charles Butterworth and Myrna Loy as members of his family.

The film is an adaptation by Samuel Hoffenstein, George Marion Jr. and Waldemar Young of the play Le Tailleur au château ("The tailor at the castle") by Paul Armont and Léopold Marchand.As a published work from 1932, the film will enter the American public domain on January 1, 2028.

== Plot ==
The story describes an encounter between a Parisian tailor named Maurice Courtelin and a family of local aristocrats. These include Vicomte Gilbert de Varèze, who owes Maurice a large amount of money for tailoring work; Gilbert's uncle the Duc d'Artelines, the family patriarch; d'Artelines' man-hungry niece Valentine; and his other 22-year-old niece, Princesse Jeanette, who has been a widow for three years. D'Artelines has been unable to find Jeanette a new husband of suitable age and rank. The household also includes three aunts and an ineffectual suitor the Comte de Savignac.

Maurice custom-tailors clothing for de Varèze on credit, but the Vicomte's unpaid tailoring bills become intolerable, so Maurice travels to d'Artelines’ castle to collect the money owed to him. On the way, he has a confrontation with Princesse Jeanette. He immediately professes his love for her, but she haughtily rejects him.

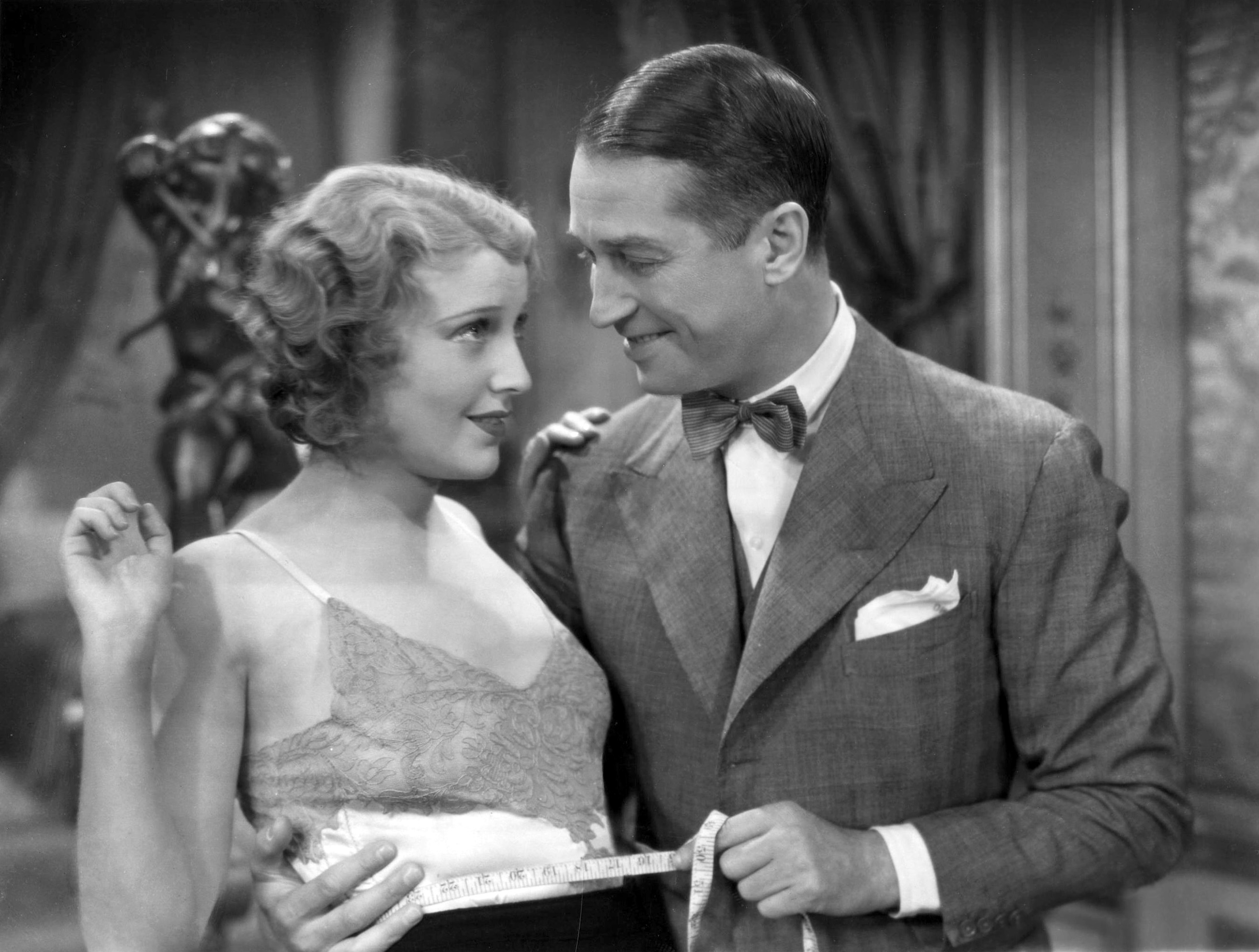
Jeanette MacDonald and Maurice Chevalier

When Maurice arrives at the castle, Gilbert introduces him as "Baron Courtelin" in order to hide the truth from the Duc. Maurice is fearful of this scheme at first, but changes his mind when he sees Jeanette. While staying at the castle, he arouses Valentine's desire, charms the rest of the family except for Jeanette, saves a deer's life during a hunt, and continues to woo Jeanette. The Comte de Savignac discovers that Maurice is a fake, but the Vicomte then claims that Maurice is a royal who is traveling incognito for security reasons. Finally, Jeanette succumbs to Maurice's charms, telling him "Whoever you are, whatever you are, wherever you are, I love you."

When Maurice criticizes Jeanette's tailor, the family confronts him for his rudeness, only to catch him and Jeanette alone with Jeanette partially undressed. Maurice explains that he is redesigning Jeanette's riding outfit, and he proves this by successfully altering it, but in the process he is forced to reveal his true identity. Despite her earlier promise, Jeanette recoils from him and runs to her room on hearing that he is a commoner. The entire household is outraged, and Maurice leaves. However, as a train carries him back to Paris, Jeanette struggles with her fears, finally realizes her mistake, and catches up to the train on horseback. When the engineer refuses to stop the train, she rides ahead and stands on the track. The train stops, Maurice jumps out, and the two lovers embrace as steam from the train envelops them.

== Cast ==
- Maurice Chevalier as Maurice, Baron Courtelin
- Jeanette MacDonald as Princesse Jeanette
- Charles Ruggles as Vicomte Gilbert de Varèze
- Charles Butterworth as Comte de Savignac
- Myrna Loy as Comtesse Valentine
- C. Aubrey Smith as the Duc d'Artelines
- Elizabeth Patterson as First Aunt
- Ethel Griffies as Second Aunt
- Blanche Friderici as Third Aunt
- Joseph Cawthorn as Dr. Armand de Fontinac
- Robert Greig as Major Domo Flammand
- Bert Roach as Émile
- George 'Gabby' Hayes as Grocer
- William H. Turner as Bootmaker

== Production ==
This was Rodgers and Hart's second motion picture. In 1930, dealing with losses from the stock market collapse in 1929, they accepted a lucrative three-picture contract from Jack Warner and went to Hollywood. Unfortunately the film they were assigned had one star who couldn't sing and another with a very limited range, so they were limited in what they could write. When the film flopped in 1931, Warner quickly bought out their contract.

Later the same year, Paramount Publix, now Paramount Pictures, hired then to work on this film with singing stars Maurice Chevalier and Jeannette McDonald and innovative director Rouben Mamoulian, a recent immigrant from Armenia who had directed the play Porgy on Broadway three years earlier.

Working together the director and songwriters "devised a singular method of staging a musical film using a previously underutilized tool: the camera itself," biographer Todd S. Purdum writes. Rodgers explained, "What we had in mind was not only moving the camera and the performers, but having the entire scene move. There was no reason why a musical sequence could not be used like dialogue and be performed uninterrupted while the action took the story to whatever locations the director wanted."

Mamoulian opened the film, as he had Porgy, with "a steadily growing symphony of everyday sounds as Paris awakens," what Chevalier's character calls "The Song of Paris." Barrios describes the opening in detail: "As a bell tolls on the soundtrack, a series of shots show Paris in the early morning, each edit hitting with a chime. The camera focuses on a sleepy district where a laborer strikes the pavement with his pickax. Cut to a bum snoring in an alley, then a charwoman sweeping a front step. Thump, snore, swish, and as more people begin their day the sounds grow in number and rhythm, the editing faster and more percussive. Clearly there’s a master in charge and his name is Mamoulian."

Purdum describes the next highlight: A few minutes later, as a brief scene of tailor Chevalier and a customer ends, "he launches into one of Rodgers and Hart’s all-time great ballads, Isn’t It Romantic? Seamlessly, without a break, the scene shifts (as does the song) from the tailor, to the customer, to a passing taxi driver and his fare, to soldiers on a troop train, to a gypsy boy who overhears them, to a campfire where the music swells to the strains of gypsy violins, to the bedchamber of Princess Jeanette (played by Jeanette MacDonald) ... The lyrics—really snatches of rhyming sung dialogue—are so perfectly suited to the action that Hart had to write a more generic alternative for the published sheet music." Mamoulian's pathbreaking technique was so successful that it has been used in complicated song and dance sequences ever since.

In addition to Isn’t It Romantic, the film features the classic Rodgers and Hart songs "Love Me Tonight", "Mimi", and "Lover". "Lover" is sung not romantically, as it often is in nightclubs, but comically, as MacDonald's character tries to control an unruly horse.

In his book Hollywood in the Thirties, John Baxter wrote, “If there is a better musical of the Thirties, one wonders what it can be.” In 1990, Love Me Tonight was selected for preservation in the United States National Film Registry by the Library of Congress as being "culturally, historically, or aesthetically significant".

== Musical numbers ==
- "That's the Song of Paree"
- "Isn't It Romantic?"
- "Lover"
- "Mimi"
- "A Woman Needs Something Like That"
- "I'm an Apache"
- "Love Me Tonight"
- "The Son of a Gun Is Nothing but a Tailor"
- "The Man for Me" (dropped before the film was released)
- "Give Me Just a Moment" (deleted before the film was completed)

== Post-1934 censorship ==
For the post-Production Code (Breen Office) re-release (after 1934), Love Me Tonight was trimmed from 96 to 89 minutes. The missing eight minutes of footage have never been restored and are presumed lost. Known deletions include Myrna Loy's portion of the "Mimi" reprise, as under the strictures of the Production Code, her negligee was deemed too revealing.

== Retrospective appraisal ==
The film has been “dismissed” by a number of critics as an inferior facsimile of Paramount directors Ernst Lubitsch and Malcolm St. Clair. Film historian Tom Milne argues that, on the contrary, Mamoulian “left his masters far behind” inventing “a delicious parody” while Lubitsch's handling of similar narratives “is merely romantic pastiche.” Milne considers it Mamoulian's “first flawless masterpiece.”

Film critic Richard Barrios calls Love Me Tonight "magical, rapturous, unique, charming, audacious, unforgettable, and, to beat a warhorse, masterpiece." He adds, "It remains less well-known than it warrants even as vastly inferior works are enshrined. . . . It is, after all, quite a provable truth: Love Me Tonight is a great film, and along with Singin' in the Rain and a very few others it resides at the very pinnacle of movie musicals, and at the apex of art." In 1990, Love Me Tonight was selected for preservation in the United States National Film Registry by the Library of Congress as being "culturally, historically, or aesthetically significant".

Biographer Marc Spergel notes a number of the devices Mamoulian brings to bear: “fast-and-slow motion, striking facial close-ups, and shadow-play.” Additionally, the exhibit shows the “montage style” of Soviet filmmaker Sergei Eisenstein in a number of sequences, notably the final chase scene between equestrian and locomotive. Momoulian crafted the Love Me Tonight as a stylistic and thematic parody of those critically acclaimed films directed by Ernst Lubitsch in which Chevalier and MacDonald had recently appeared: The Love Parade (1929) and Monte Carlo (1930). whereas Lubitsch's work is distinguished by its restraint and intimacy, a no less impressive achievement. Mamoulian's directing delivers a cinematically “bravura” treatment of the material.

== American Film Institute Lists ==
- AFI's 100 Years...100 Songs:
  - 'Isn't it Romantic?' - #73

== Home media ==
Love Me Tonight was released through Kino International DVD on November 25, 2003. Extra features included screenplay excerpts of deleted scenes, audio commentary by Miles Kreuger (Founder and President of the Institute of the American Musical, Inc. and also a good friend of Rouben Mamoulian), production documents, censorship records, and performances from Maurice Chevalier (Louise) and Jeanette MacDonald (Love Me Tonight) from the 1932 short Hollywood on Parade. There are no existing pre-Code uncensored versions of the original film.
