= Mimi (song) =

1932 popular song by Rodgers and Hart

Song
- Published: 1932
- Genre: Popular
- Composer: Richard Rodgers
- Lyricist: Lorenz Hart

"Mimi" is a popular song written by Richard Rodgers with lyrics by Lorenz Hart. It was featured in the film Love Me Tonight (1932), in which it was first sung by Maurice Chevalier to Jeanette MacDonald, then later reprised by the entire company. In the 1950s John Serrys arrangement was featured on Seeburg Corporation jukeboxes. Sergio Franchi performed the song on January 2, 1964, on the ABC Television special, Victor Borge at Carnegie Hall, also recording it on his 1963 RCA Victor Red Seal album Women in My Life.
