= Centennial International =

- Genre: Musical variety show
- Written by: Alex Barris; Alfie Scopp; Lesia Zubrak
- Country of origin: Canada
- Original language: English
- No. of seasons: 1
- No. of episodes: 4

Production
- Producer: Drew Crossan
- Running time: 30 minutes

Original release
- Network: CBC Television
- Release: 18 August – 7 September 1967

Centennial International is a Canadian musical variety show television miniseries that was broadcast on CBC Television in 1967.

== Premise ==
The series was produced for the Canadian Centennial with episodes representing the regions of the world from which Canadians trace their heritage.

== Scheduling ==
The half-hour series was broadcast on Fridays at 8:00 pm (Eastern) from 18 August to 1 September 1967, with a final episode on 7 September 1967 at 10:30 pm..

== Episodes ==
1. Mediterranean nations: starring Sergio Franchi (Italy), folk dancers The Tanets (Greece), Ivan Romanoff orchestra and chorus, and Ahuva Shai (Israel)
2. Britain: hosted by George Murray, starring Barry Morse, the 48th Highlanders of Canada pipe and drum corps, Emerald Isle Step Dancers, St. David United Welsh Choir and Irish singer Anne Linden
3. Caribbean and Latin America: hosted by Elwood Glover, starring Chicho Valle and orchestra, Los Compadres (Mexico), Chico Simon and his quintet (Haiti), Dick Smith (Jamaica), Nilda (Argentina)
4. Europe: hosted by Jan Rubeš, starring Edita Symonek (Germany), Isabel Santos (Portugal), Zemplin Slovak Dancers (Czechoslovakia) and a return of Ivan Romanoff's music group
