= 1925 in music =

This is a list of notable events in music that took place in the year 1925.

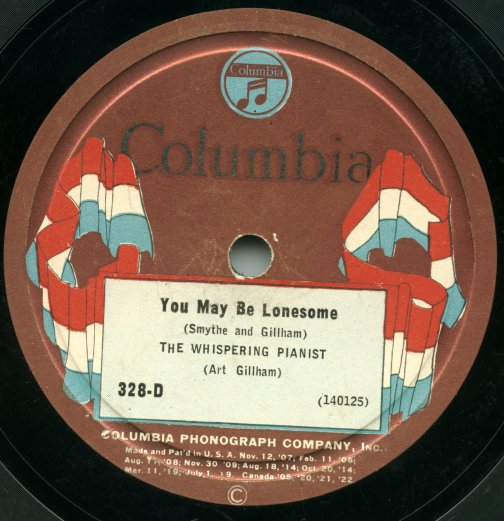
Recordings made by the new electric microphone process are released in 1925; Art Gillham is featured on this one

== Specific locations ==
- 1925 in British music
- 1925 in Norwegian music

== Specific genres ==
- 1925 in country music
- 1925 in jazz

== Events ==
- January 1 – First day of radio broadcasting in Sweden: Gaston Borch conducts the Skandia Cinema Orchestra in the country's first broadcast of orchestral music.
- February 25 – Art Gillham (The Whispering Pianist) records the first electrical recordings to be released for Columbia using the Western Electric system (Master 140125-7 issued on Columbia 328-D).
- February 26 – Eight Popular Victor Artists record "A Miniature Concert," the first recorded (cf March 16 entry below) electrical recording by the Victor Talking Machine; the artists are Billy Murray, Frank Banta, Henry Burr, Albert Campbell, Frank Croxton, John Meyer, Monroe Silver, and Rudy Wiedoeft.
- March 1 – Edgard Varèse's Intégrales is premiered in New York City.
- March 16 – The Mask and Wig Club Double Male Quartet, with orchestra directed by Nathaniel Shilkret record "Joan of Arkansas," the first issued (cf February 26 entry above) electrical recording by the Victor Talking Machine, with catalog number 19626-A; the B-side, from the same Mask and Wig Club production, is recorded March 20 by the International Novelty Orchestra, also directed by Shilkret.
- March 20 – Charles Wakefield Cadman's opera The Garden of Mystery is premiered in New York City.
- March 21 – Maurice Ravel's L'Enfant et les sortilèges is premiered in Monte Carlo.
- April 3 – Gustav Holst's opera At the Boar's Head is premiered in Manchester.
- May 16 – The first modern performance of Claudio Monteverdi's opera Il ritorno d'Ulisse in patria (1639–40) takes place in Paris.
- May 21 – Ferruccio Busoni's opera Doktor Faust, unfinished at his death in 1924, is premiered at the Sächsisches Staatstheater in Dresden.
- June 6 – Sergei Prokofiev's Symphony No. 2 is premiered in Paris.
- November 28 – The weekly country music radio program Grand Ole Opry is first broadcast on WSM radio in Nashville, Tennessee, as the "WSM Barn Dance".
- December 11 – Carl Nielsen's Symphony No. 6, the Sinfonia semplice, is premiered in Copenhagen.
- December 14 – Alban Berg's opera Wozzeck is given its first complete performance, in Berlin, conducted by Erich Kleiber.
- Joseph Canteloube founds a group called La Bourrée in Paris to publicize the folklore and other attractions of the Auvergne.
- Victor, Columbia, and His Master's Voice phonograph companies switch from old acoustic mechanical recording methods to new electric microphone technology, one of the most important advances in recording history (see Shilkret for a first-hand account of its benefits).
- Blind Lemon Jefferson's recording career begins.
- Lonnie Johnson's recording career begins.
- Louis Armstrong leaves Fletcher Henderson's Orchestra, returns to Chicago, Illinois, and makes his first records under his own name, leading Louis Armstrong and His Hot Five.

== Published popular music ==
- "Adios, Mariquita Linda" w. (Eng 1939) Ray Gilbert (Sp) Marcos A. Jimenez m. Marcos A. Jimenez
- "Alone at Last" w. Gus Kahn m. Ted Fio Rito
- "Always" w.m. Irving Berlin
- "Bam, Bam, Bamy Shore" w. Mort Dixon m. Ray Henderson
- "Boneyard Shuffle" m. Hoagy Carmichael & Irving Mills
- "Brown Eyes, Why Are You Blue?" w. Alfred Bryan m. George W. Meyer
- "By the Light of the Stars" w.m. Arthur Sizemore, George A. Little, & Larry Shay
- "Bye and Bye" w. Lorenz Hart m. Richard Rodgers
- "Cecilia" w. Herman Ruby m. Dave Dreyer
- "Cheatin' on Me" w. Jack Yellen m. Lew Pollack
- "Clap Hands! Here Comes Charley!" w. Billy Rose & Ballard MacDonald m. Joseph Meyer
- "Collegiate" w.m. Moe Jaffe & Nat Bonx
- "A Cup of Coffee, a Sandwich and You" w. Billy Rose & Al Dubin m. Joseph Meyer
- "Davenport Blues" m. Bix Beiderbecke
- "Dinah" w. Sam M. Lewis & Joe Young m. Harry Akst
- "Don't Bring Lulu" w. Billy Rose & Lew Brown m. Ray Henderson
- "Down by the Winegar Works" w.m. Don Bestor, Roger Lewis & Walter Donovan
- "Drifting and Dreaming" w. Haven Gillespie, m. Egbert Van Alstyne, Erwin R. Schmidt & Loyal Curtis
- "D'Ye Love Me?" w. Otto Harbach & Oscar Hammerstein II m. Jerome Kern. Introduced by Marilyn Miller in the musical Sunny
- "Five Foot Two Eyes of Blue" w. Sam M. Lewis & Joe Young m. Ray Henderson
- "Flamin' Mamie" w.m. Fred Rose & Paul Whiteman
- "Freshie" w. Harold Berg m. Jesse Greer
- "Grandpa's Spells" m. Jelly Roll Morton
- "Headin' for Louisville" w. B. G. De Sylva m. Joseph Meyer
- "Here in My Arms" w. Lorenz Hart m. Richard Rodgers
- "I Found a New Baby" w.m. Jack Palmer & Spencer Williams
- "I Lost My Heart in Heidelberg" w. Fritz Löhner-Beda & Ernst Neubach m. Fred Raymond
- "I Love My Baby" w. Bud Green m. Harry Warren
- "I Miss My Swiss" w. L. Wolfe Gilbert m. Abel Baer
- "I Never Knew" w. Gus Kahn m. Ted Fio Rito
- "I Wonder Where My Baby Is Tonight" w. Gus Kahn m. Walter Donaldson
- "Ida, I Do" w. Gus Kahn m. Isham Jones
- "If I Had a Girl Like You" w. Billy Rose & Mort Dixon m. Ray Henderson
- "If You Knew Susie" w. B. G. De Sylva m. Joseph Meyer
- "I'm A Little Bit Fonder of You" w.m. Irving Caesar
- "I'm Gonna Charleston Back to Charleston" w.m. Roy Turk & Lou Handman
- "I'm Gonna Cry" Martha Boswell
- "I'm in Love Again" w.m. Cole Porter
- "I'm Knee-Deep in Daisies (And Head Over Heels In Love)" Ash, Shay, Goodwin, Little, Stanley
- "I'm Sitting on Top of the World" w. Sam M. Lewis & Joe Young m. Ray Henderson
- "In Your Green Hat" w. Jack Yellen m. Milton Ager
- "I've Confessed to the Breeze" w. Otto Harbach m. Vincent Youmans, from the musical No, No, Nanette.
- "Jalousie" (a.k.a. "Jealousy") w. Vera Bloom m. Jacob Gade
- "Just a Cottage Small" w. B. G. De Sylva m. James F. Hanley
- "Keep Your Skirts Down, Mary Ann" w. Andrew B. Sterling m. Robert A. King & Ray Henderson
- "Leander" w. Harry Graham m. Jean Gilbert from the musical theater production 'Katja The Dancer'
- "Let It Rain! Let It Pour!" w. Cliff Friend m. Walter Donaldson
- "Looking For a Boy" w. Ira Gershwin m. George Gershwin. Introduced by Queenie Smith in the musical Tip-Toes
- "Love Me Tonight" w. Brian Hooker m. Rudolf Friml
- "Manhattan" w. Lorenz Hart m. Richard Rodgers
- "Moonlight and Roses" w. Ben Black m. Neil Moret (adapted without permission from a composition by Edwin Lemare)
- "My Bundle of Love" w.m. Georgie Price & Abner Silver
- "My Sweetie Turned Me Down" w. Gus Kahn m. Walter Donaldson
- "My Yiddishe Momme" w. Jack Yellen m. Lew Pollack
- "Neapolitan Nights (Nights Of Splendour)" w. Harry D. Kerr m. J. S. Zumecnik
- "No, No, Nanette" w. Otto Harbach m. Vincent Youmans
- "Oh, How I Miss You Tonight" w.m. Benny Davis, Joe Burke & Mark Fisher
- "Only a Rose" w. Brian Hooker m. Rudolf Friml
- "Paddlin' Madelin Home" w.m. Harry M. Woods
- "Pal of My Cradle Days" w. Marshall Montgomery m. Al Piantadosi
- "The Pearls" m. Jelly Roll Morton
- "Poor Little Rich Girl" w.m. Noël Coward
- "Remember" w.m. Irving Berlin
- "Roll 'Em Girls" w.m. Archie Fletcher & Bobby Heath
- "Rose of Samarkand" m. Eric Coates
- "Save Your Sorrow (for Tomorrow)" w. B. G. De Sylva m. Al Sherman
- "See See Rider Blues" by Ma Rainey
- "Sentimental Me" w. Lorenz Hart m. Richard Rodgers
- "Shake That Thing" Charlie Jackson
- "Show Me the Way to Go Home" w.m. Irving King
- "Sleepy Time Gal" w. Joseph R. Alden & Raymond B. Egan m. Ange Lorenzo & Richard A. Whiting
- "Some Day" w. Brian Hooker m. Rudolf Friml
- "Sometime" w. Gus Kahn m. Ted Fio Rito
- "Song of the Flame" w. Otto Harbach & Oscar Hammerstein II m. George Gershwin & Herbert Stothart, from the operetta Song of the Flame.
- "Song of the Vagabonds" w. Brian Hooker m. Rudolf Friml
- "Sunny" w. Otto Harbach & Oscar Hammerstein II m. Jerome Kern, from the musical Sunny.
- "Sweet and Low-Down" w. Ira Gershwin m. George Gershwin
- "Sweet Georgia Brown" w.m. Ben Bernie, Maceo Pinkard & Kenneth Casey
- "Tea for Two" w. Irving Caesar m. Vincent Youmans
- "That Certain Feeling" w. Ira Gershwin m. George Gershwin
- "That Certain Party" w. Gus Kahn m. Walter Donaldson
- "That Saxophone Waltz" w. Jules Mingo & Berry J. Sisk m. Berry J. Sisk
- "Then I'll Be Happy" w. Sidney Clare & Lew Brown m. Cliff Friend
- "Too Many Rings Around Rosie" w. Irving Caesar m. Vincent Youmans
- "Two Little Bluebirds" w. Otto Harbach & Oscar Hammerstein II m. Jerome Kern
- "Ukulele Lady" w. Gus Kahn m. Richard Whiting
- "Valentine" w. Albert Willemetz (Fr) Herbert Reynolds (Eng) m. Henri Christin
- "Waters of the Perkiomen" w. Al Dubin m. F. Henri Klickmann
- "When the Sergeant Major's on Parade" w.m. Ernest Longstaffe
- "Who Takes Care of the Caretaker's Daughter?" w.m. Chick Endor
- "Who?" w. Otto Harbach & Oscar Hammerstein II m. Jerome Kern, from the musical Sunny.
- "Why Do I Love You?" w. B. G. De Sylva & Ira Gershwin m. George Gershwin
- "The Wreck of the Shenandoah" w.m. Vernon Dalhart, Carson Robison, and Elmer S. Hughes.
- "Yearning" w. Benny Davis m. Joe Burke
- "Yes Sir, That's My Baby" w. Gus Kahn m. Walter Donaldson

== Top Popular Recordings 1925 ==
The following songs achieved the highest positions in Joel Whitburn's Pop Memories 1890-1954 and record sales reported on the "Discography of American Historical Recordings" website during 1924: Numerical rankings are approximate, they are only used as a frame of reference.

Rank	Artist	Title	Label	Recorded	Released	Chart Positions
1	Isham Jones, Guest Conductor With Ray Miller's Orchestra	"I'll See You in My Dreams"	Brunswick 2788	December 4, 1924	February 1925	US BB 1925 #2, US #1 for 7 weeks, 16 total weeks
2	Gene Austin	"Yes Sir, That's My Baby"	Victor 19656	April 24, 1924	July 1925	US BB 1925 #1, US #1 for 7 weeks, 17 total weeks
3	Ben Bernie and His Hotel Roosevelt Orchestra	"Sweet Georgia Brown"	Vocalion 15002	March 19, 1925	June 1925	US BB 1925 #4, US #1 for 5 weeks, 13 total weeks
4	Vernon Dalhart	"The Prisoner's Song"	Victor 19427	August 13, 1924	November 1924	US BB 1925 #3, US #1 for 5 weeks, 20 total weeks, 1,320,356 sales thru 1930, 7 more weeks at #1 1926
5	Eddie Cantor	"If You Knew Susie (Like I Know Susie)"	Columbia 364	July 18, 1925	September 1925	US BB 1925 #5, US #1 for 5 weeks, 12 total weeks
6	Al Jolson	"All Alone"	Brunswick 2743	October 2, 1924	December 1924	US BB 1925 #6, US #1 for 5 weeks, 9 total weeks
7	The Knickerbockers (Ben Selvin Orchestra)	"Manhattan"	Columbia 422	July 15, 1925	August 1925	US BB 1925 #7, US #1 for 4 weeks, 10 total weeks
8	The Cavaliers (Ben Selvin Orchestra)	"Oh, How I Miss You Tonight"	Columbia 359	April 11, 1925	June 1925	US BB 1925 #8, US #1 for 3 weeks, 12 total weeks
9	Marion Harris	"Tea for Two"	Brunswick 2747	October 15, 1924	January 1925	US BB 1925 #9, US #1 for 3 weeks, 11 total weeks
10	Paul Whiteman and His Orchestra	"All Alone"	Victor 19487	September 12, 1924	December 1924	US BB 1925 #10, US #1 for 3 weeks, 9 total weeks, 835,586 sales (possibly combined 10 & 11)
11	John McCormack	"All Alone"	Victor Red Seal 1067	December 17, 1924	March 1925	US BB 1925 #11, US #1 for 2 weeks, 8 total weeks
12	Ted Lewis and His Band	"O, Katharina"	Columbia 295	January 29, 1925	April 1925	US BB 1925 #12, US #1 for 1 week, 9 total weeks
13	Isham Jones Orchestra	"Remember"	Brunswick 2963	October 1, 1925	November 1925	US BB 1925 #13, US #1 for 7 weeks, 11 total weeks
14	Gene Austin	"Yearning (Just For You)"	Victor 19625	February 12, 1925	May 1925	US BB 1925 #14, US #2 for 4 weeks, 8 total weeks
15	Nick Lucas	"Brown Eyes, Why Are You Blue?"	Brunswick 2961	September 29, 1925	October 1925	US BB 1925 #15, US #2 for 3 weeks, 6 total weeks
16	Paul Whiteman and His Orchestra	"Oh, Lady Be Good!"	Victor 19551	December 29, 1924	March 1925	US BB 1925 #17, US #2 for 2 weeks, 7 total weeks
17	Paul Whiteman and His Orchestra	"Indian Love Call"	Victor 19517	November 17, 1924	January 1925	US BB 1925 #22, US #2 for 2 weeks, 7 total weeks, 526,884 sales
18	Bessie Smith	"The Saint Louis Blues"	Columbia 14064	January 14, 1925	June 13, 1925	US BB 1925 #25, US #3 for 1 week, 6 total week, 225,000 sales
19	Vincent Lopez and His Hotel Pennsylvania Orchestra	"I Want to Be Happy"	Okeh 40175	July 31, 1924	August 1925	US BB 1925 #16, US #2 for 2 weeks, 7 total weeks
20	Vernon Dalhart	"The Wreck of the Old 97"	Victor 19427	August 13, 1924	October 3, 1924	US BB 1925 #36, US #4 for 1 week, 8 total weeks, 1,085,985 sales thru 1930

== Classical music ==
- Isidor Achron – Violin Concerto No. 1
- Pedro Humberto Allende –
  - Mientras baja la nieve, for voice and piano
  - El surtidor, for voice and piano
  - A las nubes, for voice and piano
  - Ojitas de pena, for voice and piano
  - Tres Tonadas, for orchestra
  - Tempo di minuetto in C major, for piano
  - Tempo de vals, for harp
- Béla Bartók – Dance Suite (version for piano of an orchestral work written in 1923)
- Ernest Bloch – Concerto Grosso No. 1, for piano and strings
- Frank Bridge –
  - "Golden Hair", for voice and piano
  - "Journey's End", for tenor or high baritone and piano
  - The Pneu World, for cello and piano
  - Songs of Rabindranath Tagore (3), for voice and piano, or voice and orchestra
  - Vignettes de Marseille, for piano
  - Winter Pastorale, for piano
- Carlos Chávez –
  - Cake Walk, for piano
  - Los cuatro soles, ballet, for soprano and chamber orchestra
  - Energía, for nine instruments
  - Foxtrot, for piano
  - 36, for piano
- Aaron Copland – Music for the Theatre, for chamber orchestra
- Henry Cowell –
  - The Banshee, for string piano
  - Ensemble, for two violins, two cellos, and thundersticks
  - Slow Jig, for piano
- Frederick Delius – A Late Lark, for voice and orchestra
- Edward Elgar –
  - "The Herald", part-song, SATB
  - "The Prince of Sleep", part-song, SATB
- Eduardo Fabini –
  - A mi río, for mixed choir and orchestra
  - Luz mala, for soprano and orchestra
  - Triste No. 1, version for orchestra
- John Fernström – Violin Concerto No. 1
- Jacob Gade – Jalousie, for cello and piano
- George Gershwin – Piano Concerto in F
- Leopold Godowsky – Java Suite
- William Henry Harris – Faire Is the Heaven
- Gustav Holst –
  - "God Is Love, His the Care", for choir
  - Hymns (4) for Songs of Praise, for choir
  - Motets (2), for choir
  - Ode to C.K.S. and the Oriana, for choir
  - Terzetto for flute, oboe, and viola
- Herbert Howells – Piano Concerto No. 2
- Jacques Ibert – Concerto for cello and wind instruments
- John Ireland – Two Pieces for Piano 1925
- Ernst Krenek –
  - Die Jahreszeiten, Op. 35, for choir
  - Mammon, Op. 37, ballet, for orchestra
  - Der vertauschte Cupido, Op. 38, ballet, for orchestra
- Bohuslav Martinů – String Quartet No. 2
- Carl Nielsen – Symphony No. 6 Sinfonia Semplice
- Juan Carlos Paz –
  - Chorale in F-sharp major, for piano
  - Cuatro fugas sobre un tema, for piano
  - Piano Sonata No. 2, in B-flat minor
- Sergei Prokofiev – Symphony No. 2, Iron and Steel
- Ottorino Respighi –
  - Concerto in modo misolidio, for piano and orchestra
  - Poema autunnale, for violinand orchestra
  - Rossiniana, suite for orchestra
- Albert Roussel –
  - Duo, for bassoon and contrabass
  - Segovia, Op. 29, for guitar
  - Serenade, Op. 30, for flute, string trio, and harp
- Arnold Schoenberg –
  - Drei Satiren, Op. 28, for SATB choir with viola, cello, and piano
  - Vier Stücke, Op. 27, for SATB choir with clarinet, mandolin, violin, and cello
- Erwin Schulhoff – Symphony No. 1, String Quartet No. 2 ()
- Ruth Crawford Seeger –
  - The Adventures of Tom Thumb, for piano
  - Piano Preludes Nos. 1–5
- Dmitri Shostakovich – Symphony No. 1
- Jean Sibelius –
  - Ett ensamt skidspår, for reciting voice and piano
  - Herran siunaus, for choir and organ
  - Intrada, for organ, Op. 111, No. 1
  - Kolme johdantovuorolaulua, for choir and organ
  - Morceau romantique sur un motif de M. Jacob de Julin, for orchestra
  - Narciss, for voice and piano
  - Skolsång, for choir
  - Skyddskårsmarsch, for choir
  - Stormen [The Tempest], Op. 109, incidental music for Shakespeare's play
- Igor Stravinsky –
  - Serenade in A, for piano
  - Suite No. 1, for small orchestra
  - Suite, "d’après thèmes, fragments et pièces de Giambattista Pergolesi", for violin and piano
- Marcel Tournier – Images No. 1, Op. 29; Etude de Concert "Au Matin"
- Joaquín Turina –
  - La oración del torero, Op. 34, for lute quartet, also arranged for string quartet or string orchestra
  - La venta de los gatos, Op. 32, for piano
- Edgard Varèse – Intégrales
- Ralph Vaughan Williams –
  - Concerto Accademico for violin and strings
  - Flos Campi, for viola, wordless choir, and small orchestra
  - Hymns (5) for Songs of Praise, for choir
  - Two Poems by Seumas O'Sullivan, for voice and piano
  - Three Songs from Shakespeare, for voice and piano
  - Three Poems by Walt Whitman, for baritone and piano
- Heitor Villa-Lobos –
  - Chôros No. 3 ("Pica-páo"), for male choir or seven wind instruments, or both together
  - Chôros No. 5 ("Alma brasileira"), for piano
  - Chôros No. 8, for large orchestra and two pianos
  - Cirandinhas, for piano
  - O Martírio dos Insetos, for violin and orchestra
  - Sul America, for piano
- William Walton – Portsmouth Point, concert overture
- Kurt Weill – Violin Concerto
- Alberto Williams –
  - Canciones pasionales, for voice and piano
  - Piezas modernas para los niños, for piano
- Stefan Wolpe – Three Songs by Heinrich von Kleist

== Opera ==
- Alban Berg – Wozzeck
- Armstrong Gibbs – Blue Peter
- Reynaldo Hahn – Mozart
- Maurice Ravel – L'enfant et les sortilèges

== Film ==
- Edmund Meisel – Battleship Potemkin

== Musical theater ==
- Big Boy Broadway production opened at the Winter Garden Theatre on January 7 and later moved to the 44th Street Theatre for a total run of 168 performances
- Boodle London production opened at the Empire Theatre on March 10 and ran for 94 performances
- By the Way Broadway revue opened at the Gaiety Theatre on December 28 and ran for 176 performances. Starring Cicely Courtneidge.
- The Cocoanuts Broadway production opened at the Lyric Theatre on December 8 and ran for 375 performances
- Dearest Enemy (Music: Richard Rodgers, Lyrics: Lorenz Hart, Book: Herbert Fields. Broadway production opened at the Knickerbocker Theatre on September 18 and ran for 286 performances. Starring Helen Hart and Charles Purcell.
- The Dollar Princess London revival
- Garrick Gaieties Broadway revue opened at the Garrick Theatre on June 8 and ran for 211 performances
- Katja the Dancer London production opened on February 21 at the Gaiety Theatre and ran for 505 performances
- Mercenary Mary Broadway production opened at the Longacre Theatre on April 13 and ran for 136 performances
- No, No, Nanette (Irving Caesar, Otto Harbach, and Vincent Youmans)
  - London production opened at the Palace Theatre on March 11 and ran for 665 performances
  - Broadway production opened at the Globe Theatre on September 16 and ran for 321 performances
- On With the Dance London revue opened at the Pavilion on April 30 and ran for 229 performances
- Rose-Marie London production opened at the Theatre Royal, Drury Lane on March 20 and ran for 851 performances
- Sunny Broadway production opened at the New Amsterdam Theatre on September 22 and ran for 517 performances
- Tip-Toes Broadway production opened at the Liberty Theatre on December 28 and ran for 194 performances
- The Vagabond King Broadway production opened at the Casino Theatre on September 21 and ran for 511 performances

== Births ==
- January 13 – Gwen Verdon, singer and actress (d. 2000)
- January 15 – Ruth Slenczynska, American pianist (d. 2026)
- February 7 – Marius Constant, composer and conductor (d. 2004)
- February 16 – Carlos Paredes, guitarist (d. 2004)
- February 17 – Ron Goodwin, film composer (d. 2003)
- February 19 – Jindřich Feld, composer and teacher (d. 2007)
- February 26 – Delkash, singer (d. 2004)
- March 4 – Paul Mauriat, French musician (Love Is Blue) (d. 2006)
- March 8 – Dennis Lotis, South African-born British singer (d. 2023)
- March 14 – Roy Haynes, American drummer (d. 2024)
- March 22 – Gerard Hoffnung, cartoonist, comedian, musician (d. 1959)
- March 26 – Pierre Boulez, French composer, conductor and author (d. 2016)
- April 2 – Wilf Doyle, accordionist (d. 2012)
- April 14 – Gene Ammons, jazz saxophonist (d. 1974)
- April 26 – Jørgen Ingmann, guitarist (d. 2015)
- April 30 – Johnny Horton, American country music and rockabilly singer (d. 1960)
- May 14 – Boris Parsadanian, Armenian-Estonian composer (d. 1997)
- May 15 – Andrei Eshpai, composer (d. 2015)
- May 22 – James King, tenor (d. 2005)
- May 23 – Mac Wiseman, American bluegrass singer-songwriter and guitarist (d. 2019)
- May 25 – Aldo Clementi, composer (d. 2011)
- May 28 – Dietrich Fischer-Dieskau, Lieder singer (d. 2012)
- June 1 – Marie Knight, American singer (d. 2009)
- June 5 – Bill Hayes, American singer, later actor (d. 2024)
- June 25 – Clifton Chenier, zydeco accordionist (d. 1987)
- June 27
  - Fiora Contino, American opera conductor (d. 2017)
  - Doc Pomus, American songwriter (d. 1991)
- July 4 – Cathy Berberian, American mezzo-soprano and composer (d. 1983)
- July 6 – Bill Haley, American singer (d. 1981)
- July 11
  - Charles Chaynes, French classical composer (d. 2016)
  - Mattiwilda Dobbs, African American coloratura soprano (d. 2015)
  - Nicolai Gedda, Swedish operatic tenor (d. 2017)
- July 28
  - Kenneth Alwyn, conductor (d. 2020)
  - André Boucourechliev, composer (d. 1997)
- July 29 – Mikis Theodorakis, composer (d. 2021)
- July 30 – Antoine Duhamel, French composer (d. 2014)
- August 1 – Cor Edskes, Dutch organ builder and restorer (d. 2015)
- August 3 – Dom Um Romão, Brazilian jazz drummer (d. 2005)
- August 7
  - Felice Bryant, American songwriter (d. 2003)
  - Julián Orbón, Spanish Cuban composer (d. 1991)
- August 15
  - Aldo Ciccolini, pianist (d. 2015)
  - Robert Massard, French baritone (d. 2025)
  - Oscar Peterson, pianist (d. 2007)
- August 27 – Gordon Tobing, Indonesian folk singer (d. 1993)
- August 28 – Donald O'Connor, dancer, singer and actor (d. 2003)
- September 1 – Art Pepper, American jazz musician (d. 1982)
- September 2 – Russ Conway, English pianist (d. 2000)
- September 3 – Hank Thompson, American country musician (d. 2007)
- September 6 – Jimmy Reed, American blues singer (d. 1976)
- September 8 – Peter Sellers, English comic actor and novelty singer (d. 1980)
- September 9 – Soňa Červená, Czech mezzo-soprano (d. 2023)
- September 10 – Boris Tchaikovsky, Russian composer (d. 1996)
- September 11
  - Alan Bergman, American songwriter
  - Cliff Hall, English folk singer (The Spinners) (d. 2008)
  - Harry Somers, Canadian composer (d. 1999)
- September 13 – Mel Tormé, American singer (d. 1999)
- September 16 – B. B. King, American blues musician (d. 2015)
- September 26 – Marty Robbins, American country singer (d. 1982)
- September 28 – Cromwell Everson, South African composer (d. 1991)
- September 29 – Jane Stuart Smith, American operatic soprano and hymnologist (d. 2016)
- October 3 – George Wein, American jazz promoter and pianist (d. 2021)
- October 5 – Herbert Kretzmer, South African-born English songwriter (d. 2020)
- October 15 – Mickey Baker, American guitarist, half of the duo Mickey & Sylvia (d. 2012)
- October 16 – Angela Lansbury, English actress and singer (d. 2022)
- October 20 – Tom Dowd, American recording engineer/record producer (d. 2002)
- October 21 – Virginia Zeani, Romanian soprano (d. 2023)
- October 24 – Luciano Berio, Italian composer (d. 2003)
- October 29 – Zoot Sims, American jazz saxophonist (d. 1985)
- November 17 – Sir Charles Mackerras, conductor (d. 2010)
- November 22 – Gunther Schuller, composer, horn player and conductor (d. 2015)
- December 8 – Sammy Davis Jr., American entertainer (d. 1990)
- December 10 – Zdeněk Šesták, Czech composer and musiciologist (d. 2026)
- December 13 – Dick Van Dyke, American actor, singer, dancer and comedian
- December 19 – Robert B. Sherman, American songwriter, brother of Richard M. Sherman, son of songwriter Al Sherman (d. 2012)
- December 31 – Daphne Oram, British composer (d. 2003)
- date unknown – Julito Collazo, percussionist (d. 2004)

== Deaths ==
- January 6 – Ferdinand Löwe, Austrian conductor (b. 1865)
- January 8 – Jimmy Palao, African-American jazz multi-instrumentalist, leader of the Original Creole Band (born 1879)
- February 1 – John Lund, conductor and composer (b. 1859)
- February 11 – Aristide Bruant, French singer and nightclub owner (b. 1851)
- February 14 – Giuseppe Donati, inventor of the ocarina (b. 1836)
- February 17 – Alwina Valleria, operatic soprano (b. 1848)
- February 20 – Marco Enrico Bossi, organist and composer (b. 1861)
- February 21 – Fernando de Lucia, operatic tenor (b. 1860)
- February 24 – John Palm, Curaçao-born composer (b. 1885)
- March 4 – Moritz Moszkowski, Polish composer (b. 1854)
- March 22 – Marie Brema, operatic mezzo-soprano (b. 1856)
- April 3 – Jean de Reszke, operatic tenor (b. 1850)
- April 22 – André Caplet, conductor and composer (b. 1878)
- April 25 – George Stephănescu, Romanian composer (b. 1843)
- May 12 – Arthur Napoleão dos Santos, Brazilian composer and pianist (b. 1843)
- May 25 – Henry W. Petrie, US songwriter (b. 1857)
- June 3 – M. J. Niedzielski, violinist (b. 1851)
- June 16 – Emmett Hardy, jazz musician (b. 1903)
- July 1 – Erik Satie, composer (b. 1866)
- July 9 – Leverett DeVeber, politician and singer (b. 1849)
- August 4 – Charles W. Clark, American baritone (b. 1865)
- August 11 – Theodore Spiering, violinist and conductor (b. 1871)
- August 16 – Edna Hicks, blues singer (b. 1895) (killed in fire)
- September 16 – Leo Fall, composer (b. 1873)
- December 9 – Eugène Gigout, composer and organist (b. 1844)
- December 13 – Caroline von Gomperz-Bettelheim, pianist and opera singer (b. 1845)
- December 19 – José Ignacio Quintón, Puerto Rican composer and pianist (b. 1881)
- December 27 – Guido Menasci, opera librettist (b. 1867)
- date unknown – Hans Winderstein, conductor and composer (b. 1859)
