= Here in My Arms =

1925 song composed by Richard Rodgers performed by Marvin Gaye

Song
- Published: 1925
- Composer: Richard Rodgers
- Lyricist: Lorenz Hart

"Here in My Arms" is a popular song published in 1925, written by Richard Rodgers with lyrics by Lorenz Hart.

The song was introduced in the 1925 Broadway musical Dearest Enemy, by Charles Purcell and Helen Ford. It has since become a standard recorded by many artists. Popular recordings in 1926 were by Leo Reisman and by Jack Shilkret.

== Other recordings ==
- Lee Wiley – originally recorded in 1940 for a 78 rpm album Lee Wiley – Rodgers and Hart Album and later included in the compilations Hot House Rose (1996) and Legendary Song Stylist (1999).
- Doris Day – for her album Tea for Two (1950).
- Don Cherry – a single release in 1950.
- Ella Fitzgerald included this song on her 1957 Verve 2-record set: Ella Fitzgerald Sings the Rodgers and Hart Songbook, with a lush orchestra conducted by Buddy Bregman.

== Popular culture ==
- Doris Day also performed the song in the film Tea for Two (1950).
- "Here in My Arms" was one of four songs (along with "Glad to Be Unhappy", "My Heart Stood Still" and "Sing For Your Supper") the Mamas & the Papas performed on Rodgers and Hart Today, a salute to Richard Rodgers and Lorenz Hart, aired March 2, 1967, on ABC TV. Footage of "Here in My Arms", "My Heart Stood Still" and "Sing For Your Supper" can be seen on the DVD California Dreamin': The Songs of the Mamas & the Papas released in 2005. The Mamas & the Papas reworked the song as "No Salt On Her Tail" for their 1966 self-titled album, when they needed one more song to complete that album. The band never recorded a formal studio version of "Here In My Arms", however.
