= 1925 in British television =

This is a list of British television related events in 1925.

== Events ==
- 2 October – John Logie Baird demonstrates the world's first television receiver in London, using greyscale technology.

== Births ==
- 7 January – Gerald Durrell, author, naturalist and television presenter (died 1995)
- 22 April – George Cole, actor (Minder) (died 2015)
- 15 June – Richard Baker, BBC broadcast journalist and radio presenter (died 2018)
- 19 June – Charlie Drake, comedic actor (died 2006)
- 23 June – Miriam Karlin, actress (died 2011)
- 25 June – June Lockhart, actress
- 11 July – David Graham, voice actor (Thunderbirds) (died 2024)
- 15 July – Philip Carey, actor (died 2009)
- 23 July – Gloria DeHaven, actress (died 2016)
- 25 July – Jerry Paris, actor and director (died 1986)
- 12 August – Norris McWhirter co-founder of the Guinness Book of Records and TV presenter (died 2004)
- 12 August – Ross McWhirter co-founder of the Guinness Book of Records and TV presenter (died 1975)
- 15 August – Mike Connors actor (died 2017)
- 22 August – Honor Blackman, actress (died 2020)
- 28 August – Donald O'Connor, actor (died 2003)
- 2 September – Ronnie Stevens, actor (died 2006)
- 8 September – Peter Sellers, comic actor (died 1980)
- 15 September – Forrest Compton, actor (died 2020)
- 17 September – Dorothy Loudon, actress and singer (died 2003)
- 19 September – Pete Murray, disc jockey and television presenter
- 22 September – Virginia Capers, actress (died 2004)
- 23 September – Barry Linehan, actor (died 1998)
- 29 September – Steve Forrest, actor (died 2013)
- 15 October – Tony Hart, artist and children's television presenter (BBC) (died 2009)
- 16 October – Angela Lansbury, British-born actress (Murder, She Wrote) (died 2022)
- 29 October – Robert Hardy, actor (died 2017)
- 11 November – June Whitfield, comedy actress (Terry and June) (died 2018)
- 27 November – Ernie Wise, comedian (Morecambe and Wise) (died 1999)
- 13 December – Dick Van Dyke, actor

== See also ==
- 1925 in British music
- 1925 in British radio
- 1925 in the United Kingdom
