= Robert Donnelly =

Robert Donnelly may refer to:

- Bobby Donnelly (born 1987), Scottish footballer with Airdrie United
- Bobby Donnelly (bowls) (born 1962), South African lawn bowler
- Bob Donnelly, American lawyer
- Bob Donnelly (footballer) (fl. 1930s), Scottish footballer with Partick Thistle and Manchester City
- Robert True Donnelly (1924–1999), judge on the Missouri Supreme Court
- Robert William Donnelly (1931–2014), American bishop of the Catholic Church

== See also ==
- Robert Donley (born 1934), American artist
- J. Robert Donnelly Husky Heritage Sports Museum, at the University of Connecticut's main campus
