= Anna Christie =

1921 play by Eugene O'Neill

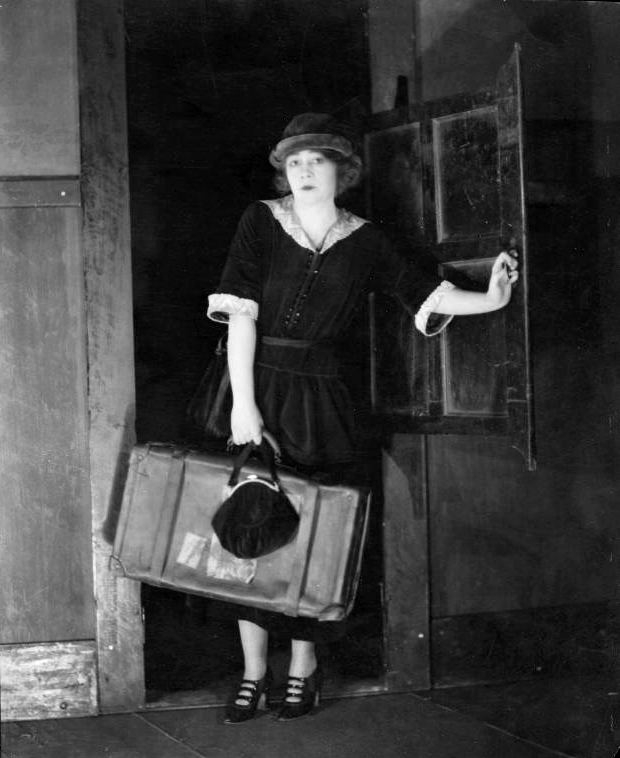
- Pauline Lord in the original Broadway production of Anna Christie (1921)
- Original language: English
- Written by: Eugene O'Neill
- Subject: A former prostitute falls in love, but runs into difficulty in turning her life around.
- Genre: Drama
- Setting: 1910; a New York City saloon; on a barge at anchor in Provincetown.

Premiere
- Date: November 2, 1921
- Place: Vanderbilt Theatre; New York City

Anna Christie is a play in four acts by Eugene O'Neill. It made its Broadway debut at the Vanderbilt Theatre on November 2, 1921. O'Neill received the 1922 Pulitzer Prize for Drama for this work. According to historian Paul Avrich, the character of Anna Christie was based on Christine Ell, an anarchist cook in Greenwich Village, who was the lover of Edward Mylius, a Belgian-born radical living in England who libeled the British king George V.

== Plot summary ==
Anna Christie is the story of a former prostitute who falls in love, but runs into difficulty in turning her life around.

=== Act I ===
The first act takes place in a bar owned by Johnny the Priest and tended by Larry. Coal-barge captain Old Chris receives a letter from his daughter, a young woman he has not seen since he lived in Sweden with his family and she was five years old. They meet at the bar and she agrees to go to the coal barge with him.

=== Act II ===
The barge crew rescues Mat Burke and four other men who survived a shipwreck in an open boat. Anna and Mat don't get along at first, but quickly fall in love.

=== Act III ===
A confrontation on the barge among Anna, Chris and Mat. Mat wants to marry Anna, Chris does not want her to marry a sailor, and Anna doesn't want either of them to think they can control her. She tells them the truth about her past: She was raped while living with her mother's relatives on a Minnesota farm, worked briefly as a nurse's aide, then became a prostitute. Mat reacts angrily, and he and Chris leave.

=== Act IV ===
Mat and Chris return. Anna forgives Chris for not being part of her childhood. After a dramatic confrontation, Anna promises to abandon prostitution and Mat forgives her. Chris agrees to their marriage. Chris and Mat have both signed to work aboard a ship that is leaving for South Africa the next day. They promise to return to Anna after the voyage.

== Cast and characters ==
=== Characters ===
- Anna Christie — Chris's daughter, a young woman marked by a turbulent past
- Mat Burke — Anna's lover, a tall rugged stoker of the sea
- Chris C. Christopherson — Father of Anna, captain of the barge Simeon Winthrop
- Marthy Owen – A rough and hard-drinking companion to Christopherson
- Johnny the Priest – presides over the saloon where Anna and Chris reconnect
- Larry — bartender
- Johnson — deckhand on barge
- Two longshoremen
- A postman

=== Notable casts ===
Character	Broadway Revival	Broadway Revival	Broadway Revival	West End Revival	Off-Broadway Revival
Character	1952	1977	1993	2011	2025
Anna Christie	Celeste Holm	Liv Ullmann	Natasha Richardson	Ruth Wilson	Michelle Williams
Mat Burke	Kevin McCarthy	John Lithgow	Liam Neeson	Jude Law	Tom Sturridge
Chris Christopherson	Art Smith	Robert Donley	Rip Torn	David Hayman	Brian d’Arcy James
Marthy Owen	Grace Valentine	Mary McCarty	Anne Meara	Jenny Galloway	Mare Winningham
Johnny the Priest	Frank Rowan	Richard Hamilton	Christopher Wynkoop	N/A	Timothy Hughes
Larry	Jerry Parris	Ken Harrison	Barton Tinapp	N/A	Joe Carroll
Johnson	Robert Anderson	Jack Davidson	N/A	N/A	N/A

== Productions ==
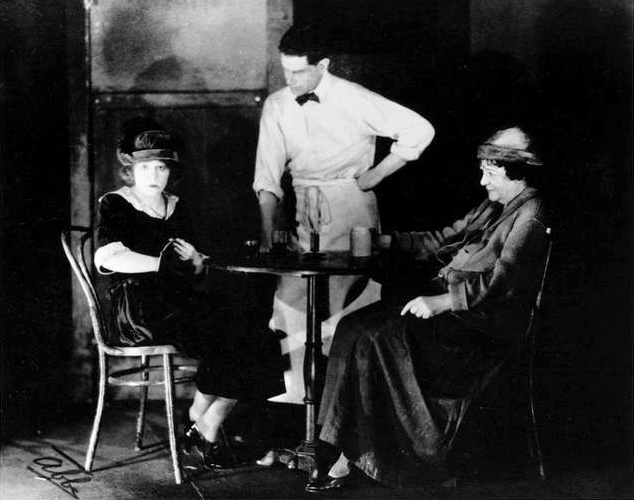
Pauline Lord as Anna Christopherson, James T. Mack as Johnny-the-Priest, and Eugenie Blair as Marthy Owen in the original Broadway production of Anna Christie (1921)

O'Neill's first version of this play, begun in January 1919, was titled Chris Christopherson and performed as Chris in out-of-town tryouts. O'Neill revised it radically, changing the barge captain's daughter Anna from a pure woman needing to be protected into a prostitute who finds reformation and love from life on the sea. The new version, now titled Anna Christie, premiered on Broadway at the Vanderbilt Theatre on November 2, 1921, and ran for 177 performances before closing in April 1923. The production was staged by Arthur Hopkins and starred Pauline Lord.

Alexander Woollcott in The New York Times called it "a singularly engrossing play", and advised "all grown-up playgoers" to see it.

The London West End premiere was staged at the Strand Theatre (now the Novello) in 1923. This was the first time an O'Neill play was seen in the West End. The play starred Pauline Lord, who had been the original Anna Christie on Broadway. The play had a great reception. Time magazine wrote, "In London, the first night of Eugene O'Neill's Anna Christie, with Pauline Lord in the title role, received a tremendous ovation. After the first act the curtain was rung up a dozen times during the applause."

=== Revivals ===
- 1952: The play was revived at the Lyceum Theatre on January 23, 1952, staged by Michael Gordon and designed by Emeline C. Roche with Celeste Holm as Anna, Kevin McCarthy, and Arthur O'Connell. It ran for 8 performances.

Poster for the 1977 Broadway revival by James McMullan

- 1955: The play was revived at the Teatro 5 de diciembre of Mexico City, directed by Tulio Demicheli. It starred Silvia Pinal as Anna and Wolf Ruvinskis.
- 1966: The play was successfully revived in Los Angeles at the Huntington Hartford Theatre on May 2 and ran through May 21. Directed by Jack Garfein, it starred his wife Carroll Baker as Anna, with James Whitmore as Chris and Hermione Baddeley as Marthy. The show then transferred to the Tappen Zee Playhouse in Nyack, New York where it ran from June 23 to July 2 with Isabel Jewel replacing Baddeley as Marthy.
- 1977: The play was revived at the Imperial Theatre on April 14, 1977, directed by José Quintero and designed by Ben Edwards. It starred Liv Ullmann as Anna, Robert Donley, John Lithgow and Mary McCarty. It received Tony Award nominations for Liv Ullmann as Best Actress and for Mary McCarty as Best Featured Actress. It ran for 124 performances.
- 1990: The play was staged at the Young Vic theatre in London and starred Natasha Richardson.
- 1993: The play was revived on Broadway on January 14, 1993 by The Roundabout Theatre Company at the Criterion Center Stage Right. It was directed by David Leveaux and designed by John Lee Beatty. It starred Natasha Richardson, Liam Neeson, Anne Meara, and Rip Torn. It received Tony Award nominations for Best Actress (Natasha Richardson), Best Actor (Liam Neeson), Best Featured Actress (Anne Meara), Best Direction (David Leveaux), and won the award for Best Revival. Neeson and Richardson both received the Theatre World Award. The production won the Drama Desk Award for Outstanding Revival and the Drama Desk Award for Outstanding Actress in a Play for Richardson. It ran for 54 performances.
- 2002: The play was directed by Gar Campbell at the Pacific Resident Theatre, rerunning from January 5, 2002 to May 5, 2002, starring Lesley Fera.
- 2011: The play was produced at the Donmar Warehouse, London, running from August 4, 2011 to October 8, 2011, with Ruth Wilson as Anna, Jude Law as Mat, and David Hayman as Chris. It was positively received by critics, with mostly 4 and 5 star reviews, and it won the 2012 Olivier Award for "best revival".
- 2025: The play was revived off-Broadway at St. Ann's Warehouse in Brooklyn, directed by Thomas Kail and starring Michelle Williams, Tom Sturridge, Brian d'Arcy James and Mare Winningham.

== Adaptations ==
Blanche Sweet's Anna Christie was featured on the cover of The Silver Sheet, a studio publication promoting Thomas Ince Productions (1923)

Anna Christie was adapted by Bradley King for a 1923 film of the same name directed by John Griffith Wray and Thomas H. Ince, with stars Blanche Sweet, William Russell, George F. Marion, and Eugenie Besserer.

The play inspired the 1923 film Kiri no Minato directed by Kenji Mizoguchi with a plot that differs from the original. This film is lost.

A 1930 film adaptation by Frances Marion was directed by Clarence Brown and starred Greta Garbo, Charles Bickford, George F. Marion, and Marie Dressler. This pre-Code film used the marketing slogan "Garbo Talks!", as it was her first talkie. Her first spoken line has become one of her most famous: "Give me a whiskey with ginger ale on the side, and don't be stingy, baby." George F. Marion, who had played Anna's father in the original Broadway production, reprised the role in the 1923 and 1930 film adaptations.

A German-language adaptation, also starring Garbo, was filmed and released in 1930. This version was adapted by Frances Marion, translated by Walter Hasenclever, and directed by Jacques Feyder. Besides Garbo, the cast included Theo Shall, Hans Junkermann, and Salka Viertel.

In 1957, New Girl in Town, a musical adaptation by George Abbott with music and lyrics by Bob Merrill, opened on Broadway and ran for 431 performances. A 1959 adaptation staged by London's Unity Theatre featured an all-Black West Indian cast with Sylvia Carle as Anna and Neville Monroe as Mat.

In 2018, Encompass New Opera Theatre presented an opera adaptation composed by Edward Thomas with a libretto by Joe Masteroff at the Baruch College Performing Arts Center in New York. Directed by Nancy Rhodes and conducted by Julian Wachner, it featured Melanie Long in the title role, Frank Basile as Chris, Jonathan Estabrooks as Mat, Joe Hermlayn as Marthy, and Mike Pirozzi as Larry. It ran for 12 performances. A recording with the original cast, produced by Thomas Z. Shepard and conducted by Julian Wachner with the orchestra NOVUS New York, was released by Broadway Records in 2019, the outcome of a collaboration between Trinity Church and Encompass New Opera Theatre.

== Trivia ==
According to actress Ellen Burstyn in the 2012 film Marilyn in Manhattan, Marilyn Monroe performed a scene from Anna Christie at the Actors Studio with Maureen Stapleton. Calling the story "legendary," Burstyn said, "Everybody who saw that says that it was not only the best work Marilyn ever did, it was some of the best work ever seen at Studio, and certainly the best interpretation of Anna Christie anybody ever saw. She... achieved real greatness in that scene."

== Awards and nominations ==
=== Original Broadway production ===
Year	Award	Category	Nominee	Result
1922	Pulitzer Prize for Drama		Eugene O'Neill	Won

=== 1977 Broadway production ===
Year	Award	Category	Nominee	Result
1977	Tony Awards	Best Actress in a Play	Liv Ullmann	Nominated
1977	Tony Awards	Best Featured Actress in a Play	Mary McCarty	Nominated
1977	Outer Critics Circle	Outstanding Actress in a Play	Liv Ullman	Won

=== 1993 Broadway production ===
Year	Award	Category	Nominee	Result
1993	Tony Awards	Best Revival of Play		Won
1993	Tony Awards	Best Direction of a Play	David Leveaux	Nominated
1993	Tony Awards	Best Actor in a Play	Liam Neeson	Nominated
1993	Tony Awards	Best Actress in a Play	Natasha Richardson	Nominated
1993	Tony Awards	Best Featured Actress in a Play	Anne Meara	Nominated
1993	Drama Desk Award	Outstanding Revival of a Play		Won
1993	Drama Desk Award	Outstanding Actress in a Play	Natasha Richardson	Nominated
1993	Outer Critics Circle	Outstanding Revival of a Play		Won
1993	Outer Critics Circle	Outstanding Debut Performance	Natasha Richardson	Won
1993	Theater World Award	Distinguished Performance	Liam Neeson	Won
1993	Theater World Award	Distinguished Performance	Natasha Richardson	Won

=== 2011 West End Revival ===
Year	Award	Category	Nominee	Result
2012	Laurence Olivier Awards	Best Revival		Won
2012	Laurence Olivier Awards	Best Actor	Jude Law	Nominated
2012	Laurence Olivier Awards	Best Actress	Ruth Wilson	Won
2012	Laurence Olivier Awards	Best Costume Design	Rob Howell	Nominated
2012	Laurence Olivier Awards	Best Lighting Design	Howard Harrison	Nominated

=== 2026 Off-Broadway production ===
Year	Award	Category	Work	Result	Ref.
2026	Drama League Awards	Outstanding Revival of a Play		Pending	
