= Eugenie Blair =

American actress

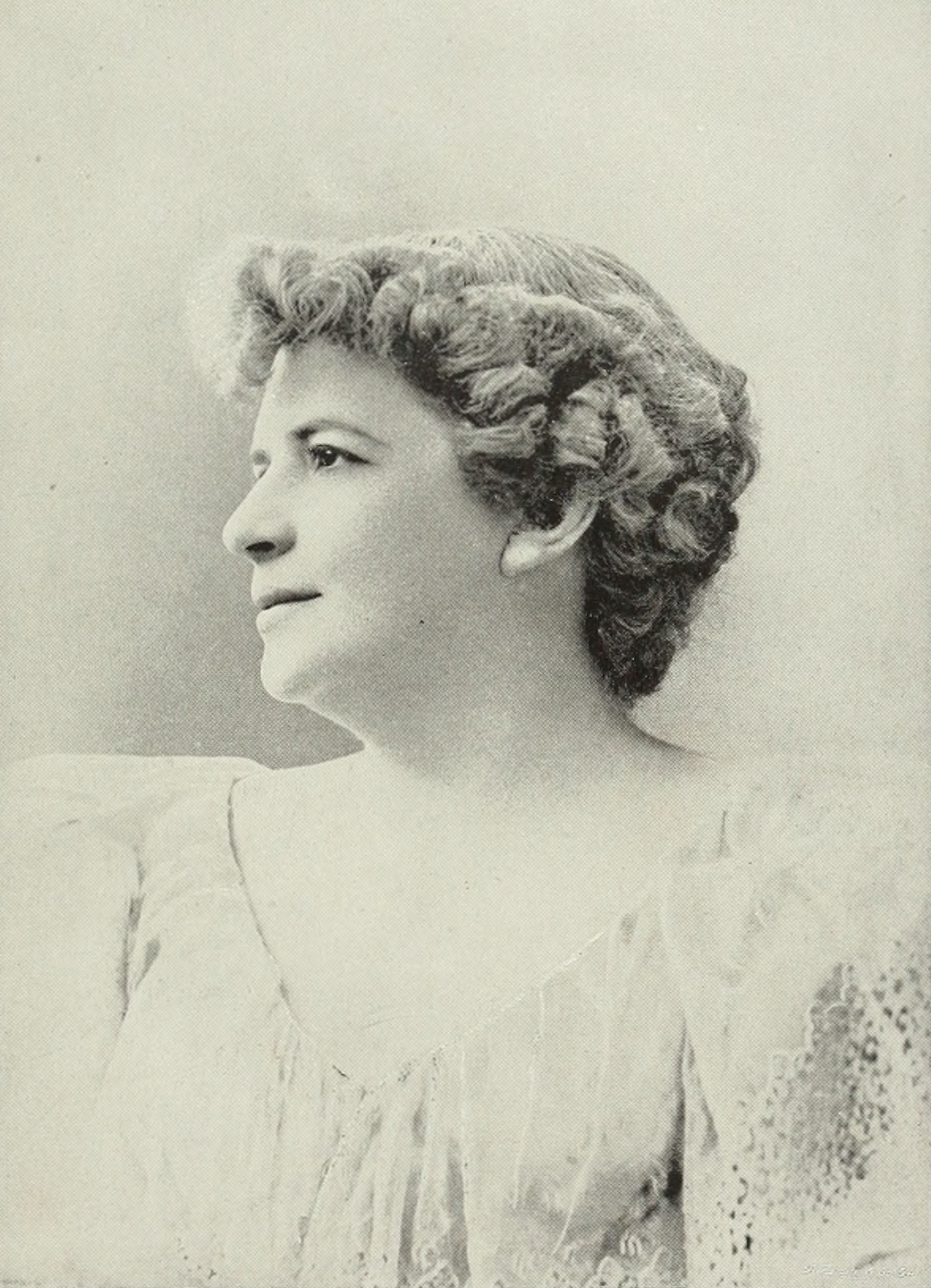
- Blair photographed by William McKenzie Morrison, 1894
- Born: Eugenie A. Blair; 1864; Columbia, South Carolina, U.S.
- Died: May 13, 1922 (aged 57–58); Chicago, Illinois, U.S.
- Resting place: Rosehill Cemetery
- Spouse: Robert L. Downing
- Children: 1

Eugenie Blair (1864 – May 13, 1922) was an American stage actress. The daughter of actress Ella Wren, she began her career performing in the Wren Family act in variety theatre as a child. In her youth she mainly performed in theaters in Chicago, and then toured widely as a stage actress as a young adult. Her performances on Broadway were sporadic in her early to mid career, but at the end of her life she appeared in several productions on the New York stage from 1918-1922; most notably as Marthy Owen in the original production of Eugene O'Neill's Anna Christie.

== Biography ==
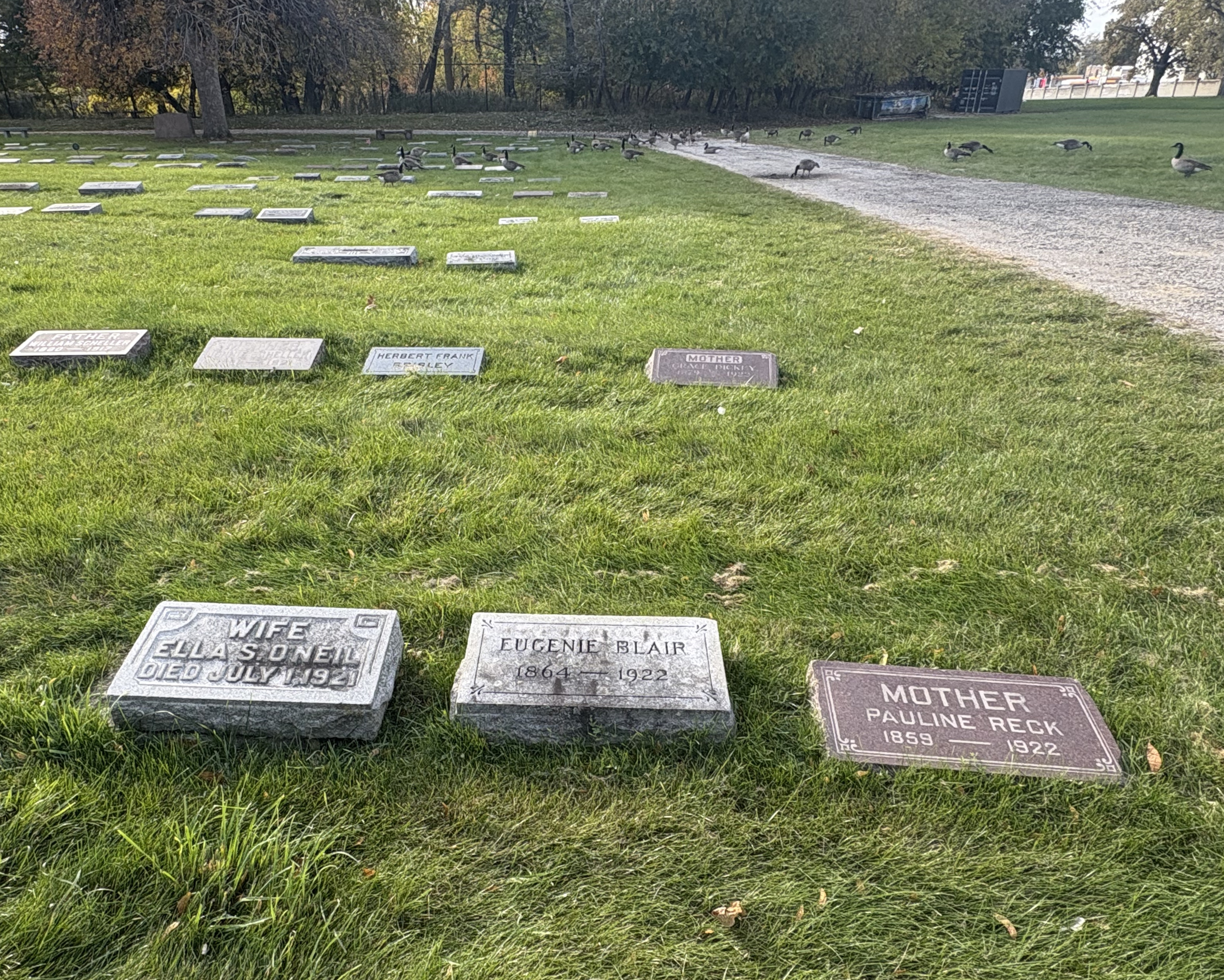
Blair's grave (center) at Rosehill Cemetery

The daughter of Charles Blair and Ella Wren Blair, Eugenie A. Blair was born in South Carolina in 1864. Her mother was also an actress, and she began performing as a child alongside her mother and her siblings, George and Martha, in an act billed as the Wren Family in 1873. While performing principally out of Chicago she married her first husband, actor Forest Robinson, in 1881 when she was approximately 17 years old. The marriage did not last long, and by 1885 she was married to her second husband J. J. Calvert. She later married a third time to Shakespearean actor Robert L. Downing. They divorced in 1913.

At the age of 22, Blair was touring with Lawrence Barrett in 1886. The San Francisco Examiner, while reviewing Barrett's work at the peak of his career, commented favorably on Blair's acting:

In "The Wonder" and "The King's Pleasure" Miss Eugenia Blair has had her first opportunity since the engagement began. She is a charming young actress, with a very attractive voice and manner.... In the "King's Pleasure" especially she looks like a bit of lovely old porcelain, and she fits perfectly into the significant and Hugoesque fragment of French romance which Alfred Thompson has dressed in such poetic and expressive English.

In 1886, Blair first appeared on the New York stage at the Windsor Theatre as Calanthe in Damon and Pythias. Her Broadway appearances were sporadic until towards the end of her life when she appeared with some regularity. In 1918, she portrayed Mme. Zenion in Lillian Trimble Bradley and George Broadhurst's The Woman on the Index at the 48th Street Theatre. In 1919 she performed the role of Mrs. Harvey Wattles in George V. Hobart and Herbert Hall Winslow's Just Around the Corner at the Longacre Theatre, and The Hostess in John T. McIntyre's A Young Man's Fancy at the Playhouse Theatre.

In 1920, Blair created the role of Jane DePuyster in Lew Fields's Poor Little Ritz Girl at the Central Theatre. That same year she portrayed Carton in The Outrageous Mrs. Palmer at the 39th Street Theatre. In 1921, she portrayed The Governor's Wife in George M. Cohan's The Tavern at the Hudson Theatre with Norman Hackett portraying her character's husband. Her final role on Broadway was the one for which she is best remembered: Marthy Owen in the original production of Eugene O'Neill's Anna Christie which ran at the Vanderbilt Theatre in 1921-1922.

On May 13, 1922, Blair died moments after walking offstage at the Cort Theatre in Chicago during her performance in Anna Christie, which she chose to carry out in spite of not feeling well that evening. She was buried at Rosehill Cemetery in Chicago.
