= Poor Little Ritz Girl =

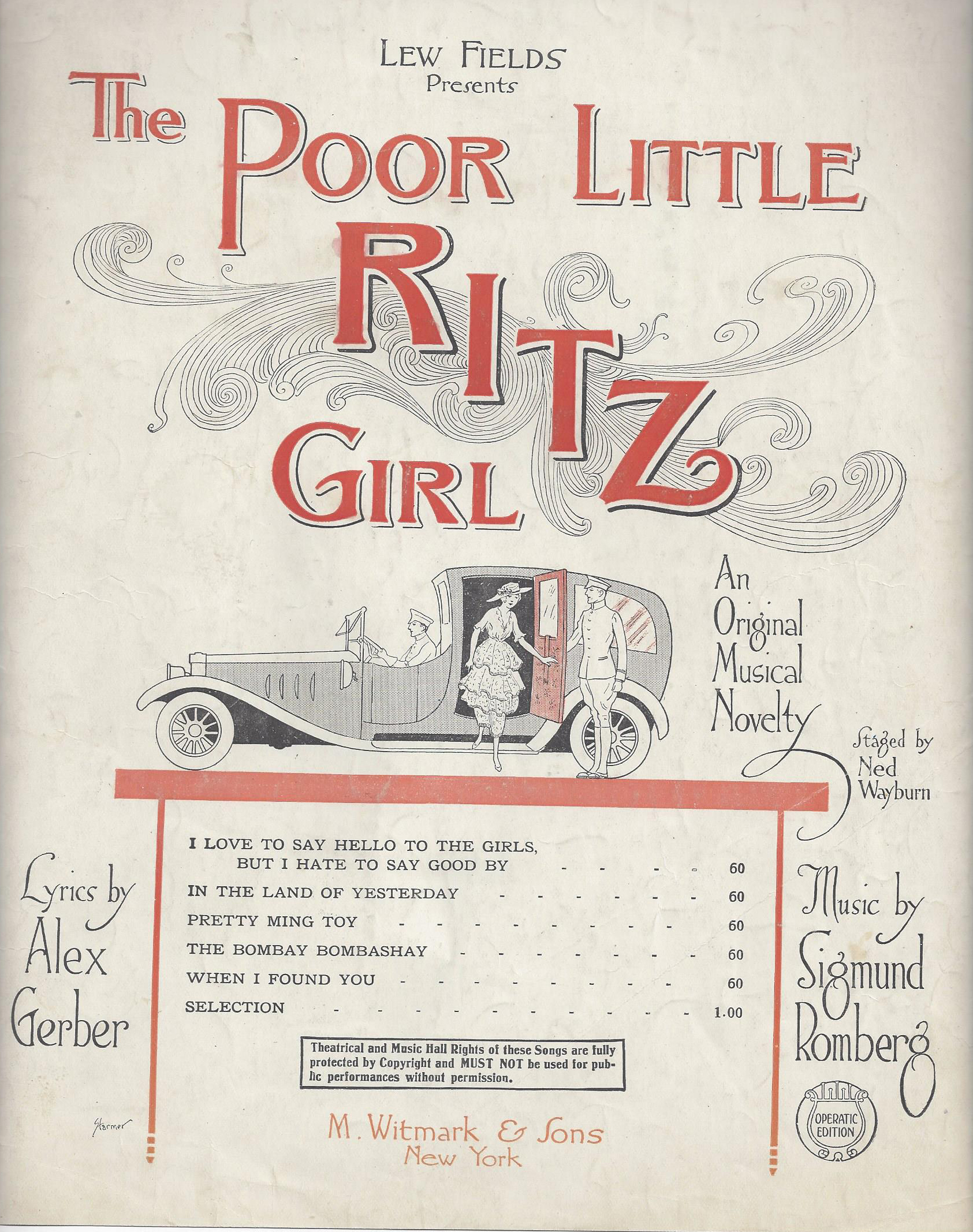
- Sheet Music Cover
- Music: Sigmund Romberg and Richard Rodgers
- Lyrics: Alex Gerber and Lorenz Hart
- Book: Lew Fields and George Campbell

Poor Little Ritz Girl is a musical comedy in two acts, with book by George Campbell and Lew Fields. The show had some songs with lyrics by Alex Gerber and music by Sigmund Romberg and other songs with lyrics by Lorenz Hart and music by Richard Rodgers. The show was produced by Lew Fields at the Central Theatre. It opened on July 28, 1920.

The production was staged by Ned Wayburn, who also did the lighting design. It was choreographed by David Bennett, scenic design by H. Robert Law, and costume design by Cora MacGeachy, Anna Spencer and Marie Cook. The musical director was Pierce de Reeder. It ran for 93 performances, closing on October 16, 1920. The cast headlined Charles Purcell and Andrew Tombes, and included Eugenie Blair, Ruth Hale, Eleanor Griffith, Lulu McConnell, Aileen Poe, and Florence Webber. Several songs in Poor Little Ritz Girl were recycled from Fly With Me, which Rodgers and Hart had written for the Varsity Show earlier that year, including "You Can't Fool Your Dreams", "Love's Intense in the Tents", and "Mary Queen of Scots".

Set in New York City, the plot revolves around Annie “Sweetie” Farrell (Florence Webber), an honest but poor chorus girl who rented a furnished apartment on Riverside Drive during the run of a musical in which she was appearing. Late one night she learns that the apartment belongs to a rich young bachelor named William Pembroke (Charles Purcell), who had not given anyone permission to rent it. He comes home to live in his apartment to find that she's occupying his own bedroom. Annie is so perturbed that she can hardly sing, but she convinces Bill, who is a baritone, that she meant no harm. He decides to let her stay there while he puts himself up at his club. Two acts later they are married.

The New York Times sub-headline reported that the musical "Shows Clever Transformation from Flat to Theatre Stage" and the review said the show "contains much that is above the average of musical comedy, as well as a good deal that is just average."

== Songs ==
Lyrics by Alex Gerber and music by Sigmund Romberg except as noted by ** (lyrics by Lorenz Hart and music by Richard Rodgers) or by * (lyrics by Herbert Fields and music by Richard Rodgers).

Act 1

- “Poor Little Ritz Girl”
- “Mary, Queen of Scots”*
- “Love Will Call”**
- “Pretty Ming Toy”
- “I Love to Say Hello to the Girls”
- “When I Found You”

Act 2

- “You Can’t Fool Your Dreams” **
- “What Happened Nobody Knows”**
- “My Violin”
- “All You Need To Be a Star”**
- “Love’s Intense in Tents”**
- “The Daisy and the Lark”**
- “In the Land of Yesterday”
- “The Phantom Waltz”
- “The Bombay Bombashay”
