= Mary McCarty (actress) =

American actress, singer, dancer, comedian (1923–1980)

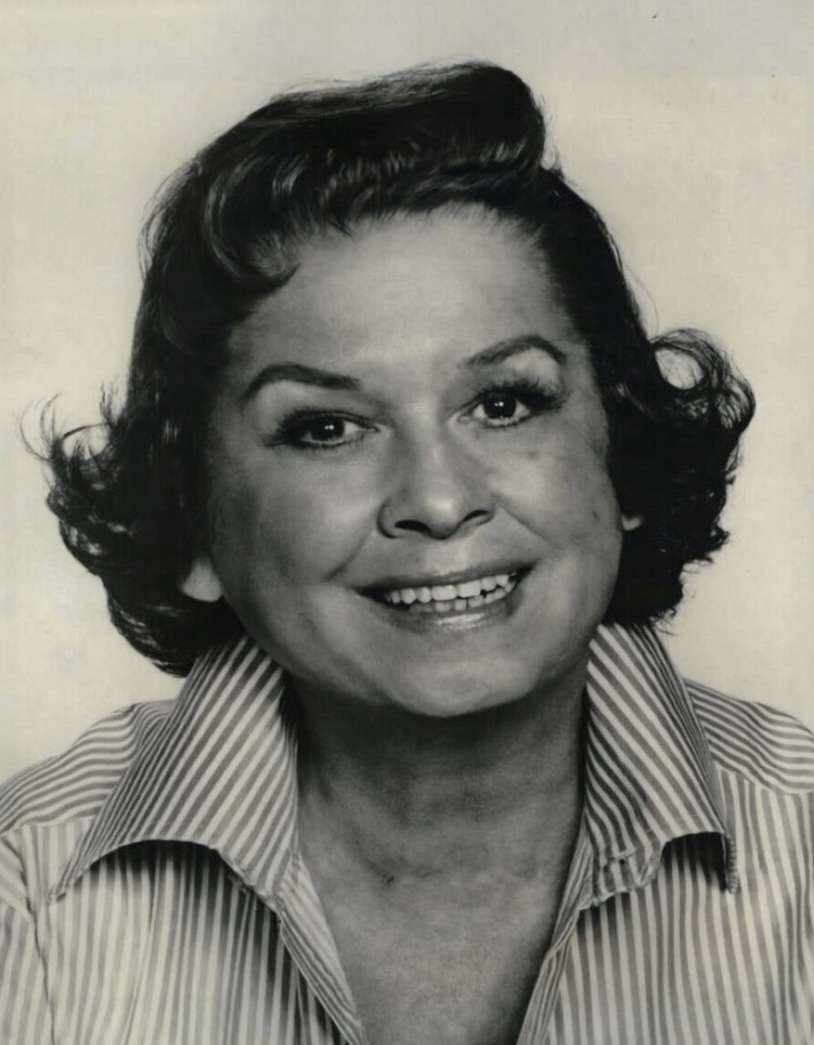
- McCarty in Trapper John, M.D., 1979
- Born: September 27, 1923; Winfield, Kansas, U.S.
- Died: April 3, 1980 (aged 56); West Los Angeles, California, U.S.
- Occupations: Actress; singer; dancer; comedienne
- Years active: 1930–1980
- Known for: Trapper John, M.D.; Anna Christie
- Partner: Margaret Lindsay

Mary McCarty (September 27, 1923 – April 3, 1980) was an American actress, singer, dancer, and comedian, perhaps best known for her role as nurse Clara "Starch" Willoughby on the television series Trapper John, M.D.

== Early years ==
McCarty was born in Winfield, Kansas in September 1923, but grew up in Los Angeles after her parents divorced and she and her mother went to live with her great-grandmother.

== Career ==
McCarty's versatility as a performer was highlighted in a review in the September 11, 1948, issue of the trade publication Billboard. Reviewer Bill Riley described McCarty as "a versatile, pretty young Ethel Merman-to-be, who can sing a novelty or a torch song, dance a turn ... or act a sketch with the best of them."

McCarty began appearing in musical revues in Los Angeles when she was 5 years old. As a youngster, she performed with other child actresses, including Shirley Temple and Jane Withers. Her first screen credit came in Rebecca of Sunnybrook Farm. By 1934, she had appeared in approximately 75 films. Her films as an adult included The French Line (1953), All That Jazz (1979), and Somebody Killed Her Husband (1978).

In the era of old-time radio, McCarty starred in the comedy The Redhead (1952), and she was a regular on the variety show This Is Broadway (1949). On television, in addition to portraying nurse Clara Willoughby on Trapper John, M.D. (1979), McCarty was a regular on the variety series Admiral Broadway Revue (1949) and The Arthur Murray Party (1950). (1950).

McCarty's Broadway credits included Anna Christie (1977), Chicago (1975), Irene (1973), Follies (1971), A Rainy Day in Newark (1963), Bless You All (1950), Miss Liberty (1949), Small Wonder (1948), and Sleepy Hollow (1938). She replaced Ethel Merman as the star of the national touring company of Gypsy. Her appearances in regional theatrical productions included Panama Hattie in St. Louis, Missouri.

She performed in stage revues as a child. At age 10, she sang in six languages and was "quite an accomplished dancer as well." As an adult, she performed in night clubs, including the Mocambo in West Hollywood, California, the Chase Club in St. Louis, Missouri, and the Flamingo in Las Vegas, Nevada.

McCarty's other professional activities included choreographing a production of Man of La Mancha in Israel and teaching at the Herbert Berghof Studio.

== Personal life ==
McCarty never married. According to biographer and historian William J. Mann, McCarty was the life partner of actress Margaret Lindsay.

On April 3, 1980, Lindsay found McCarty dead on the floor of her home in West Los Angeles. She was 56. The cause of death remained undetermined after an autopsy, with results of a toxicology awaited.

== Recognition ==
In 1977, McCarty was nominated for a Tony Award for Best Featured Actress in a Play for her work in Anna Christie. After her death, her character on Trapper John, M.D. was written out and the experienced older nurse role was replaced with Madge Sinclair as Nurse Ernestine Shoop.
