= The Raid (1954 film) =

1954 film by Hugo Fregonese

- Directed by: Hugo Fregonese
- Screenplay by: Sydney Boehm
- Story by: Francis M. Cockrell (as Francis Cockrell)
- Based on: Affair at St. Albans; 1948 novel by Herbert Ravenel Sass (as Herbert Ravenal Sass)
- Produced by: Robert L. Jacks
- Starring: Van Heflin; Anne Bancroft; Richard Boone; Lee Marvin
- Cinematography: Lucien Ballard
- Edited by: Robert Golden
- Music by: Roy Webb
- Color process: Technicolor
- Production company: Panoramic Productions
- Distributed by: 20th Century Fox
- Release dates: August 4, 1954 (United States); August 20, 1954 (New York City)
- Running time: 83 minutes
- Country: United States
- Language: English
- Budget: $650,000

The Raid is a 1954 American Western film set during the American Civil War. It stars Van Heflin, Anne Bancroft, Richard Boone and Lee Marvin. It is loosely based on a true incident, the St. Albans Raid, as well as the book by Herbert Ravenal Sass. However the film made a significant change, turning the raid into an act of revenge for William Tecumseh Sherman's burning of Atlanta.

== Plot ==
In 1864 during the American Civil War, a group of Confederate prisoners held in a Union prison stockade at Plattsburgh, New York, not many miles from the Canada–US border, escape. They head for Montréal, Quebec and then plan a raid across the border into St. Albans, Vermont, to rob its banks to replenish the Confederate treasury and burn buildings as revenge for Sherman's March to the Sea and to tie up the Union forces.

Major Neal Benton (Van Heflin), the leader of the raid, heads into St. Albans as a spy and develops ambiguous feelings about what he is doing when he becomes friends with an attractive young war widow and her friendly son, who he boards with, masquerading as a Canadian businessman. Other raiders stay in an abandoned barn or pose as travelling street peddlers. One drunken member interrupts a church service and is promptly shot dead by Benton, the raid leader, almost giving away the plot. The townspeople shower Benton with gratitude for this, not realizing his own true identity.

On the appointed day, Major Benton in town, and the other raiders at the barn, all don Confederate uniforms, take some citizens hostage, rob the bank's strongbox at gunpoint, burn down the town hall, and gallop north just ahead of an arriving Union force. Burning a bridge behind them, they barely elude the Union forces and make a successful getaway to nearby Canada.

== Cast ==
- Van Heflin as Maj. Neal Benton
- Anne Bancroft as Katy Bishop
- Richard Boone as Capt. Lionel Foster
- Lee Marvin as Lt. Keating
- Tommy Rettig as Larry Bishop
- Peter Graves as Capt. Frank Dwyer
- Douglas Spencer as Rev. Lucas
- Paul Cavanagh as Col. Tucker
- Will Wright as Josiah Anderson
- James Best as Lt. Robinson
- John Dierkes as Cpl. Fred Deane
- Helen Ford as Delphine Coates
- Dolores Fuller (uncredited)
- Claude Akins as Lieutenant Ramsey (uncredited)
