= Lina Abarbanell =

American soprano singer (1879–1963)

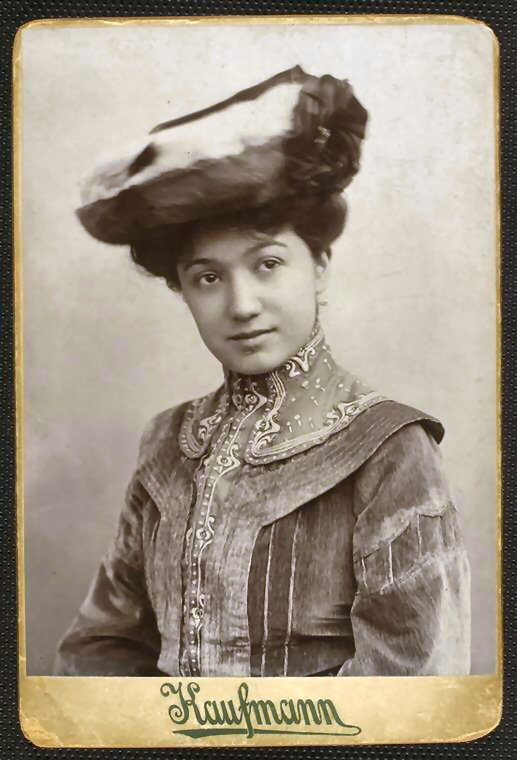
- 1900-1910
- Born: January 3, 1879; Berlin, Germany
- Died: January 6, 1963 (aged 84); Montefiore Hospital The Bronx, New York, US
- Occupations: Soprano singer in grand and light opera and musical comedy.

Lina Abarbanell (January 3, 1879 – January 6, 1963) was an American soprano who performed in grand and light opera and musical comedy. She made her debut at fourteen as Adele in the operetta Die Fledermaus, at the Royal Opera House in Berlin. She was first introduced to American theatergoers in 1905 as the soubrette in the Josef Strauss operetta Frühlingsluft (Spring Air). Abarbanell made opera history later that year as Hänsel in The Met's debut production of Engelbert Humperdinck's Hänsel und Gretel. Abarbanell spent the following near thirty years performing on Broadway and at venues across America. After her husband's death in 1934, Abarbanell left the stage, but remained active over virtually the remainder of her life as a Broadway casting director, producer, and stage director.

== Early life and career ==
Lina Abarbanell was born in Berlin, then under Imperial Germany, to Paul and Marie Abarbanell. Her father, a descendant of a prominent Sephardic Jewish family of Bulgarian descent, was a well-known Berlin musical director.

She trained for the stage under her father and at schools in Berlin and Vienna. Abarbanell made her first informal appearances on stage at the age of six or seven. At the Deutsches Theater, Berlin she was among the cast that supported Josef Kainz in an 1896 revival of Lupaci Vagabundus, or the Good-For-Nothing Clover Leaf, a farce by Johann Nestroy. After some additional musical training, the following year she joined the Grand Opera, Poznań (then part of the German Empire) performing in Les Huguenots, Hänsel und Gretel, The Geisha, and as Hadvig Ekdal in Ibsen's The Wild Duck. Later Abarbanell appeared in Die Fledermaus at the Royal Opera House, Berlin, and commenced on a tour of opera houses in Germany, Belgium, Denmark, Austria and the Netherlands.

In 1900, Abarbanell had success in the title role of a German language adaptation of Seymour Hicks and Harry Nicholls's A Runaway Girl at the Neues Königliches Opernhaus.

== American career ==
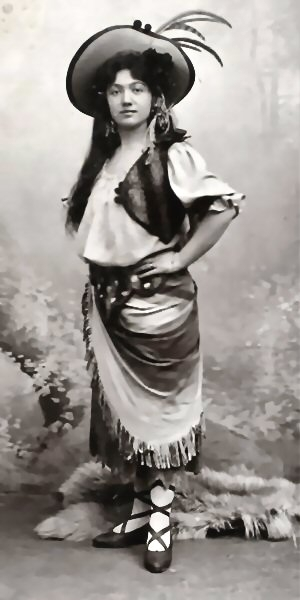
Lina Abarbanell

In 1905, Heinrich Conried, manager of the Irving Place Theatre and the Metropolitan Opera House, brought Abarbanell to New York. Her American debut came that October at Irving Place in Frühlingsluft (Spring Breezes) followed a month later playing Lt. Von Vogel in Jung Heidelberg (Young Heidelberg), a comic opera with music from Carl Millöcker and book by Leopold Krenn and Karl Lindau. Her debut at the Metropolitan Opera House as Hänsel to Bella Alten's Gretel came on November 25, 1905.

After honing her language skills Abarbarbanell made her English-speaking debut at the Garden Theatre on Christmas Day, 1906, as Lisa in the musical comedy The Student King.

In March 1907 she began a tour in The White Chrysanthemum, but left by the end of the month following a dust-up over a dressing room issue with co-star Edna Wallace Hopper. That October she played the lead character Sonia in Franz Lehár's The Merry Widow at the Colonial Theatre, Chicago. The Merry Widow, which ran simultaneously at Chicago and New York, was a huge success, netting an estimated one million dollars over its first year. The New York production was performed initially at the New Amsterdam Theatre and starred Ethel Jackson until she fell ill in March 1908 and was replaced by Abarbanell. After a successful national tour in The Merry Widow, Abarbanell replaced Elgie Bowen as Nellie Vaughan in the romantic musical The Love Cure at the New Amsterdam in October 1909. At the same venue the following August, Abarbanell played the title role in the musical comedy Madame Sherry, which had a run of 231 performances and was later taken on tour.

Abarbanell remained active on Broadway and in road productions for over two decades. Her most popular endeavor during this time was probably as Mademoiselle Martinet in The Grand Duke, a comedy by Sacha Guitry that was produced by David Belasco at the Lyceum Theatre. The Grand Duke had a respectable run between November 1921 and March 1922 and a later road tour. Abarbanell last appeared on the Broadway stage at the end of January 1934 in the very short-lived play Theodora, the Quean.

== Eduard Goldbeck ==
Abarbanell married the German political writer Eduard Goldbeck (April 21, 1866 – April 25, 1934) in 1900. Goldbeck was born in Berlin where he attended university before serving as an officer for seven years with the Prussian Army. In 1911 he permanently relocated to the United States where for a number of years he wrote commentaries on current events and literature for the Chicago Tribune. Books Goldbeck authored include Krieg in Sicht! (1906) Deutschlands Zukunft die Nationaldemokratie! (1907) Politische Plaudereien (1908), and Briefe an den Deutschen Kronprinzen (1908) Goldbeck died of cirrhosis of the liver in 1934 at their residence in the Hotel Somerset on West Forty-Seventh Street, New York. The couple's only child was the writer Eva Goldbeck (1901–1936), who married composer Marc Blitzstein in 1933.

== Later career ==
In 1931 a large barn in Westport, Connecticut was transformed into the Westport County Playhouse. Three years later The Chimes of Normandy, Arthur Guiterman's adaptation of the Robert Planquette operetta, opened their 1934 summer season with Helen Ford and George Meader in the lead roles, Lawrence Langner stage director, Gene Martell choreographer, and Lina Abarbanell chorus director.

Abarbanell returned to Broadway in 1938 as an assistant to Dwight Deere Wiman on the hit musical comedy I Married an Angel. She would continue on working in some capacity on Broadway productions for nearly the remainder of her life. Abarbanell's only known film credit was as a casting consultant on the 1954 musical Carmen Jones.

== Death ==
Abarbanell died after a heart attack on January 6, 1963, at Montefiore Hospital, in the Bronx, New York.
