= Peggy-Ann =

Musical

- Sheet music cover
- Music: Richard Rodgers
- Lyrics: Lorenz Hart
- Book: Herbert Fields
- Basis: Edgar Smith's musical Tillie’s Nightmare
- Productions: 1926 Broadway; 1927 London

Peggy-Ann is a musical comedy with music by Richard Rodgers, lyrics by Lorenz Hart and book by Herbert Fields, based on the 1910 musical Tillie’s Nightmare by Edgar Smith. The plot of the musical takes place in Glens Falls, New York; New York City, and Havana, Cuba.

== Production ==
The musical opened on Broadway at the Vanderbilt Theatre on December 27, 1926 and closed on October 29, 1927, after 333 performances. It was produced by Lew Fields (Herbert's father) and Lyle D. Andrews. Staged by Robert Milton, with musical staging by Seymour Felix, it starred Helen Ford as Peggy-Ann, Lester Cole, Lulu McConnell, and Betty Starbuck.

In London, the musical opened in the West End at Daly's Theatre on July 29, 1927 and ran for 130 performances. Directed by Lew Fields, Dorothy Dickson starred as Peggy-Ann.

The musical was considered daring for its time: there was no opening chorus and no songs for the first 15 minutes. The plot, told in one long dream, focuses on Peggy-Ann’s dream fantasies. She is the niece of the owner of a boarding house in New York and the fiancée of a local boy. She escapes from a hum-drum life through dreams of herself as a wealthy adventuress, with a yacht and a husband.

== Songs ==
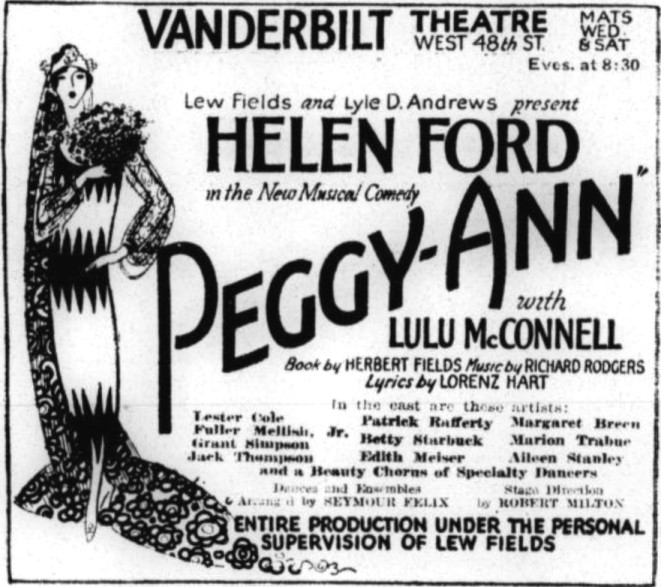
1926 advertisement in Variety

- "Hello"
- "A Tree in the Park"
- "Howdy Broadway" (Howdy to Broadway)

Act 1

- "A Little Birdie Told Me So"
- "Charming, Charming"
- "Where’s That Rainbow?"

Act 2

- "We Pirates from Weehawken"
- "In His Arms"
- "Chuck It!"
- "I'm So Humble"
- "Havana"
- "Maybe It’s Me"
- "Give This Little Girl a Hand"
- "The Race (Peggy, Peggy)"

== Critical response ==
The Time review praised the "Gilbertian satire, Broadway slapstick, attractive dancers... the charm of the music." However, according to Merle Secrest, none of the songs "stood the test of time", except, possibly, "Where’s That Rainbow?". This may be why, according to Armond and L. Marc Fields, Peggy-Ann is not remembered as one of the outstanding musicals of the 1920s.

The New York Times reviewer wrote that the creators "have brought freshness and ideas to the musical-comedy field."
