= Tea for Two (album) =

Soundtrack album by Doris Day
- Released: September 4, 1950
- Recorded: July 14–25, 1950
- Label: Columbia

Doris Day chronology
Young Man with a Horn (1950)	Tea for Two (1950)	Lullaby of Broadway (1951)

Tea for Two was a 10" LP album released by Columbia Records on September 4, 1950. It was released under catalog number CL-6149, featuring Doris Day, with Axel Stordahl conducting the orchestra on some pieces, and the Page Cavanaugh Trio as backup musicians on others. It contained songs from the soundtrack of the movie of the same name.

== Chart performance ==
The album debuted on Billboard magazine's Best-Selling Popular Record Albums chart in the issue dated October 20, 1950, peaking at No. 3 during a nineteen-week run on the chart, which was a long run on an album chart at the time.

== Track listing ==
1. "Crazy Rhythm" (Joseph Meyer, Roger Wolfe Kahn, Irving Caesar) (duet with Gene Nelson & The Page Cavanaugh Trio) (recorded July 25, 1950) - 2:24
2. "Here in My Arms" (Richard Rodgers, Lorenz Hart) (with Axel Stordahl's orchestra) (recorded July 14, 1950) - 3:04
3. "I Know That You Know" (Vincent Youmans, Anne Caldwell) (duet with Gene Nelson & The Page Cavanaugh Trio) (recorded July 25, 1950) - 2:47
4. "I Want to Be Happy" (Vincent Youmans, Irving Caesar) (with The Page Cavanaugh Trio) (recorded July 25, 1950) - 2:39
5. "Do Do Do" (George Gershwin, Ira Gershwin) (with Axel Stordahl's orchestra) (recorded July 14, 1950) - 2:11
6. "I Only Have Eyes For You" (Harry Warren, Al Dubin) (with Axel Stordahl's orchestra) (recorded July 14, 1950) - 3:19
7. "Oh Me! Oh My! Oh You!" (Vincent Youmans, Ira Gershwin) (duet with Gene Nelson & The Page Cavanaugh Trio) (recorded July 25, 1950) - 2:26
8. "Tea for Two" (Vincent Youmans, Irving Caesar) (with Axel Stordahl's orchestra) (recorded July 14, 1950) - 3:11

This album, combined with Lullaby of Broadway, was reissued in compact disc form in 2001.

== Credits ==
- Irving Caesar Composer
- Anne Caldwell Composer
- Page Cavanaugh Vocals
- Doris Day Primary Artist, Vocals
- Al Dubin Composer
- George Gershwin Composer
- Ira Gershwin Composer
- Lorenz Hart Composer
- Roger Wolfe Kahn Composer
- Ken Lane Vocals
- Joseph Meyer Composer
- Gene Nelson Vocals
- Richard Rodgers Composer
- Axel Stordahl Orchestra Director
- Harry Warren Composer
- Vincent Youmans Composer

== Charts ==
Chart (1950)	Peak position
US Billboard Best-Selling Popular Record Albums	3
