= Robert L. Downing =

American stage actor (1857–1944)

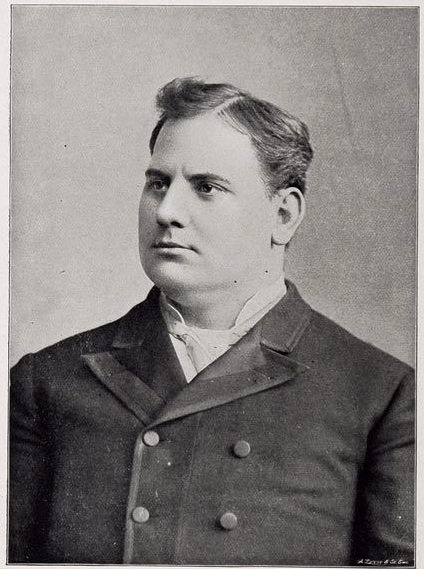
- Born: Robert Lindley Downing; October 28, 1857; Washington, D.C., U.S.
- Died: 1944 (aged 86–87)
- Resting place: Mount Olivet Cemetery; Frederick, Maryland, U.S.
- Occupations: actor, preacher
- Years active: 1876-1908
- Spouse: Eugenie Blair

Robert L. Downing (1857–1944) was an American stage actor who specialized in Shakespeare characterizations. As a young actor he toured with Mary Anderson and Joseph Jefferson. He became a star in his own right in 1886 and afterward performed Shakespearean parts. He was born in Washington, D.C., and after retiring from acting in 1908 he became a preacher.

Downing was buried at Mount Olivet Cemetery in Frederick, Maryland.
