= Ned Wayburn =

American choreographer (1874–1942)

- Born: Edward Claudius Weyburn; March 30, 1874; Pittsburgh, Pennsylvania, U.S.
- Died: September 2, 1942 (aged 68)
- Occupation: Choreographer

Edward Claudius Weyburn; 30 March 1874 – 2 September 1942) was an American choreographer.

== Career ==
Edward Claudius Weyburn was born on March 30, 1874 in Pittsburgh, Pennsylvania to Elbert Delos Weyburn and his wife, Harriet Landon Beach. He spent much of his childhood in Chicago where he studied theatre and classical piano. At the age of 21, he abandoned his family's tradition of manufacturing for a teaching position at the Hart Conway School of Acting in Chicago. (Note: The Hart Conway School of Acting – the namesake of its founder, Hart Conway (1840–1919) – became a part of the Chicago Musical College in 1898.) There, faculty members C.H. Jacobsen, Colonel Thomas Hoyer Monstery and elocutionist Ida Simpson-Serven, disciples of François Delsarte, influenced him and inspired his growing interest in dance and movement.

After leaving the school, Wayburn spent many years in theater staging shows for producers Oscar Hammerstein I and his son William Hammerstein, and the theatrical booking agency Klaw and Erlanger. In 1906, he began his own management group called the Headline Vaudeville Production Company. Through his own firm he staged many feature acts, while collaborating with other producers such as Lew Fields, Florenz Ziegfeld and the Shuberts. In 1915, he began working with Ziegfeld and became the main choreographer of the Ziegfeld Follies.

Wayburn’s choreography was based on five techniques: musical comedy, tapping and stepping, acrobatic work, toe specialties, and exhibition ballroom. As a child, he was captivated by Minstrel shows and recreated them in many of his works. Formation symmetry was common in minstrel shows, as well as parade. Wayburn used Minstrel style costumes and makeup in his show Minstrel Misses (1903).

His choreography was influenced by social dances of the time. His dancers moved in units of two or four, following popular trends. He took dances such as tangos, the Turkey Trot, the Grizzly Bear, the Black Bottom, and the Charleston and recreated them for stage performances by using strong exaggerations of movement.

Some of his well-known shows were Phantastic Phantoms (1907), The Daisy Dancers (1906), Havana (1909), The Goddess of Liberty (1910), The Passing Show (1913), and all of the Ziegfeld Follies. He created steps such as the “Ziegfeld Walk” and the “Gilda Glide”, and is credited with developing the talent of such iconic performers as Fred Astaire, Jeanette MacDonald, Gilda Gray, Marilyn Miller, Ann Pennington, Barbara Stanwyck, Clifton Webb, Mae West, Groucho Marx, June Allyson, and Fanny Brice. In 1920, he staged the musical comedy Poor Little Ritz Girl with music by Richard Rodgers and Sigmund Romberg. Wayburn also played himself in the film The Great White Way (1924) in a scene with the Follies chorus "drilling with military precision" during a rehearsal.

== Marriages ==
Wayburn was married three times – first, from 1897 to about 1905, to Agnes Wayburn (née Agnes Lillian Saye; 1876–1949), who had been one of the two original "Florodora" sextets. He then was married, from 1908 to 1916, to Helene "Smiles" Davis (né Helen Sylvia Davis; 1890–1981); and then, from 1916 until his death, to Marguerite V. Lee Kirby (maiden; 1890–1978). Agnes Wayburn was married again, from 1913 until her death, to José Campodónico (born about 1882), a textile manufacturer from Montevideo, Uruguay.
