= Dearest Enemy =

Musical by Herbert Fields and Rodgers and Hart

- Sheet music cover
- Music: Richard Rodgers
- Lyrics: Lorenz Hart
- Book: Herbert Fields
- Basis: A true American Revolutionary War incident
- Productions: 1925 Broadway

Dearest Enemy is a musical with a book by Herbert Fields, lyrics by Lorenz Hart, and music by Richard Rodgers. This was the first of eight book musicals written by the songwriting team of Rodgers and Hart and writer Herbert Fields, and the first of more than two dozen Rodgers and Hart Broadway musicals. The musical takes place in 1776, during the American Revolutionary War, when Mary Lindley Murray detained British troops long enough in Manhattan to give George Washington time to move his vulnerable troops.

== Background and productions ==
Hart got the idea for the musical from a plaque in Manhattan about Murray. He, Rodgers and Fields first took their musical to Fields' father, Lew Fields, to produce, but he declined, thinking a Revolutionary War story would not be commercial. At the time, Rodgers and Hart were unknown young songwriters, but in May 1925, they wrote songs for a charity revue, The Garrick Gaieties, which became a surprise success, and their songs were a hit. Ultimately George Ford, husband of Helen Ford, a star of the show, agreed to produce it. The musical had been variously described as an operetta and a genuine comic opera in the press. Ford presented a tryout of the musical, titled Dear Enemy at the Ohio Colonial Theatre in Akron, Ohio in July 1925. After rewrites, it played for a week in Baltimore in early September 1925.

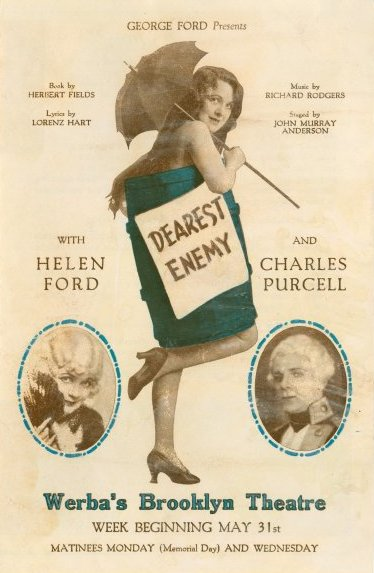
Advertisement for a 1926 run featuring Helen Ford and Charles Purcell

The Broadway production opened on September 18, 1925 at the Knickerbocker Theatre and closed on May 22, 1926, after 286 performances. Directed by John Murray Anderson, the cast included Flavia Arcaro as Mary, Helen Spring as Jane, John Seymour as Captain Harry Tryon, Helen Ford as Betsy Burke, Charles Purcell as Captain Sir John Copeland, Alden Gay as Caroline, Marian Williams as Annabelle, Jane Overton as Peg, Andrew Lawlor Jr. as Jimmy Burke, William Eville as General Henry Clinton, Harold Crane as General William Howe, Detmar Poppen as General John Tryon, Arthur Brown as Lieutenant Sudsby, Percy Woodley as General Israel Putnam, James Cushman as Major Aaron Burr, Jack Shannon as Private Peters, Mark Truscott as Private Woods, Percy French as Private Lindsay, Frank Lambert as Envoy, and H. E. Eldridge as George Washington. The success of the show led to many more Rodgers and Hart musicals. Despite a good run with very favorable reviews and a national tour, revivals afterwards were few.

The musical was seen in 1976 at the Goodspeed Opera House, as an American bicentennial production, and in 1996 at 42nd Street Moon in San Francisco. It was given an on-book concert in 1999 by the Musicals Tonight! troupe with piano accompaniment. In 2002, for the Richard Rodgers centennial, New York's amateur Village Light Opera Group (VLOG) produced the show conducted by Ron Noll with an orchestration reconstructed by Larry Moore. A centenary performance took place on June 21, 2025, at the Goodyear Theater in Akron, Ohio, the city where the musical premiered.

== Plot ==
The story is based on an American Revolutionary War incident in September 1776 when Mary Lindley Murray, under orders from General George Washington, detained General William Howe and his British troops by serving them cake, wine and conversation in her Kips Bay, Manhattan home long enough for some 4,000 American soldiers, fleeing their loss in the Battle of Brooklyn, to reassemble in Washington Heights and join reinforcements to make a successful counterattack.

Patriot Mary Murray (of the Murray Hill Murrays) and her young ladies are working to sew uniforms for American soldiers, but they are sad at the absence of their young men. Mary's flirty daughter Jane leads British General Tryon's son Harry to her house; she finds him charming. His commander, General Howe, and some British officers commandeer Mary's house as their temporary headquarters. Mary instructs the houseful of beautiful young ladies to discourage the British soldiers, but the girls are eager to engage the enemy in more than just conversation. George Washington sends word to Mary asking her to try to detain Howe and his officers overnight. Mary's feisty, feminist Irish niece Betsy Burke comes home wearing only a barrel after a dog steals her clothes while she is swimming. British Captain Sir John Copeland has gallantly supplied the barrel. Though divided by nationality and Copeland's sexism, they fall in love ("Here In My Arms").

Mary gives a ball for the British officers, promising to show them some of the beauties of the local countryside. The British soldiers are happy to spend time consuming refreshment and indulging in music, dancing and flirtation at the Murray mansion. Betsy and Sir John dream of being together when the war is over as Jane and Harry also fall in love ("Bye and Bye"). Mary's messenger is captured, and Betsy volunteers to take an update to General Washington. She is told to return to Mary's house and, when the coast is clear for the American soldiers to move, to light a lantern then put it out. Upon her return, Sir John and she acknowledge their love for each other. When Sir John falls asleep, Betsy lights the signal. The American soldiers march North safely. Sir John is captured but, in the post-war epilogue, he is freed and reunited with Betsy.

== Songs ==
Act I

- "Heigh-Ho, Lackaday!" – Mrs. Murray and Girls
- "War Is War" – Mrs. Murray and Girls
- "I Beg Your Pardon" – Jane and Harry
- "Cheerio" – Sir John and Officers
- "Full Blown Roses" – Mrs. Murray, Officers and Girls
- "The Hermits" – Mrs. Murray and General Tryon
- "Here in My Arms" – Betsy and Sir John
- Finale – Ensemble

Act II

- Gavotte – Officers and Girls
- "I'd Like to Hide It" – Betsy and Girls
- "Where the Hudson River Flows" – Mrs. Murray, Howe, Tryon, Officers and Girls
- "Bye and Bye" – Betsy and Sir John
- "Old Enough to Love" – General Tryon and Girls
- "Sweet Peter" – Officers and Girls
- "Here's a Kiss" – Betsy and Sir John

Act III

- "Opening" – Ensemble
- "Here in My Arms" (reprise) – Betsy

Note: During the tryouts, numerous songs were cut from the production, including Ale, Ale, Ale!, "Duet (in the barrel)" (which became the solo song "Oh, Dear"), "Girls Do Not Tempt Me", and "The Three Musketeers". The duet "Dear Me" (formerly "Oh, Dear") is believed to have been cut from the show because Mrs. Ford could not dance in only a barrel costume while holding a parasol.

== Critical response ==
The critic of The New York Times "waxed rhapsodic over [songs] 'that are as uncommon as most of them are beautiful'", and the New York Evening World called the book "wise and truly witty and genuinely romantic" and praised the beauty and freshness of the songs. Historian Stanley Green wrote that there was a "well-sustained attempt" to match the music to the plot and period. The ballads were "dainty, charming pieces." The Telegram reviewer wrote that "We have a glimmering notion that someday they will form the American counterpart of the once great triumvirate of Bolton, Wodehouse, and Kern."

== Adaptations and recordings ==
A television musical special featuring Cyril Ritchard, Anne Jeffreys, Robert Sterling, and Cornelia Otis Skinner as Mrs. Murray, in an adaptation by Neil Simon, was broadcast on November 26, 1955, and the soundtrack is still available. A cast recording of that broadcast was released on compact disc in 1997. In 2013, New World Records released a recording of the complete score in the Moore reconstruction. The recording features the Orchestra of Ireland, conducted by David Brophy, with Kim Criswell as Mrs. Murray. According to Steven Suskin, writing in Playbill, it "couldn't be bettered".
