= 1925 in British radio =

This is a list of events from British radio in 1925.

== Events ==
- 4 July – The Meteorological Office's Shipping Forecast is first broadcast by the BBC.
- 27 July – The British Broadcasting Company's Daventry transmitting station on Borough Hill, Daventry in central England opens as the world's first longwave broadcast radio transmitter (call sign: 5XX), taking over from its Chelmsford facility.

== Births ==
- 17 February – Joy Nichols, Australian-born musical comedy performer (died 1992)
- 25 May – Derek Cooper, food writer and broadcaster (died 2014)
- 15 June – Richard Baker, broadcaster (died 2018)
- 19 June – Charlie Drake, comedian (died 2006)
- 28 July – Kenneth Alwyn, orchestral conductor (died 2020)
- 8 September – Peter Sellers, comedy actor (died 1980)
- 19 September – Pete Murray, DJ
- 22 September – William Franklyn, actor (died 2006)
- 27 October – Monica Sims, radio executive (died 2018)
- 11 November – June Whitfield, comedy actress (died 2018)
