= Wilf Doyle =

- Born: Wilfred Doyle; April 2, 1925; Conception Harbour, Dominion of Newfoundland
- Died: June 8, 2012 (aged 87) St. John's, Newfoundland and Labrador, Canada
- Instrument: Accordion
- Labels: Rodeo, Audat
- Formerly of: Wilf Doyle and His Orchestra

Wilf Doyle (2 April 1925 — 8 June 2012) was a Canadian folk musician, generally regarded as one of the pioneers of accordion music of Newfoundland. In 2007, the Newfoundland and Labrador Folk Festival gave him a Lifetime Achievement Award.

Doyle was born in Conception Harbour. He played accordion from the age of nine, and in 1944, started performing with his band, Wilf Doyle and His Orchestra. He was first recorded in 1956 and went on to make 11 records, being regular at TV and radio broadcasts. He performed mainly traditional Newfoundland songs, well-known as well as lesser known.

William Keating, a member of the Wilf Doyle band, founded the rock group, The Keatniks, based in Labrador City. The group in 1965 made the first rock-and-roll record by native Newfoundlanders.

== Albums ==
From 1956:

- Jigs and Reels of Newfoundland
- Wilf Doyle and his Orchestra Play the Quadrilles and a Selection of Favorite Newfoundland Old Time Music
- The Mighty Churchill
- More Dance Favorites
- The Isle of Newfoundland
- The Sailor's Alphabet
- Souvenirs and Memories
