= Central Theatre (New York City) =

Former theatre in Manhattan, New York

Coordinates: 40.759°N 73.985°W

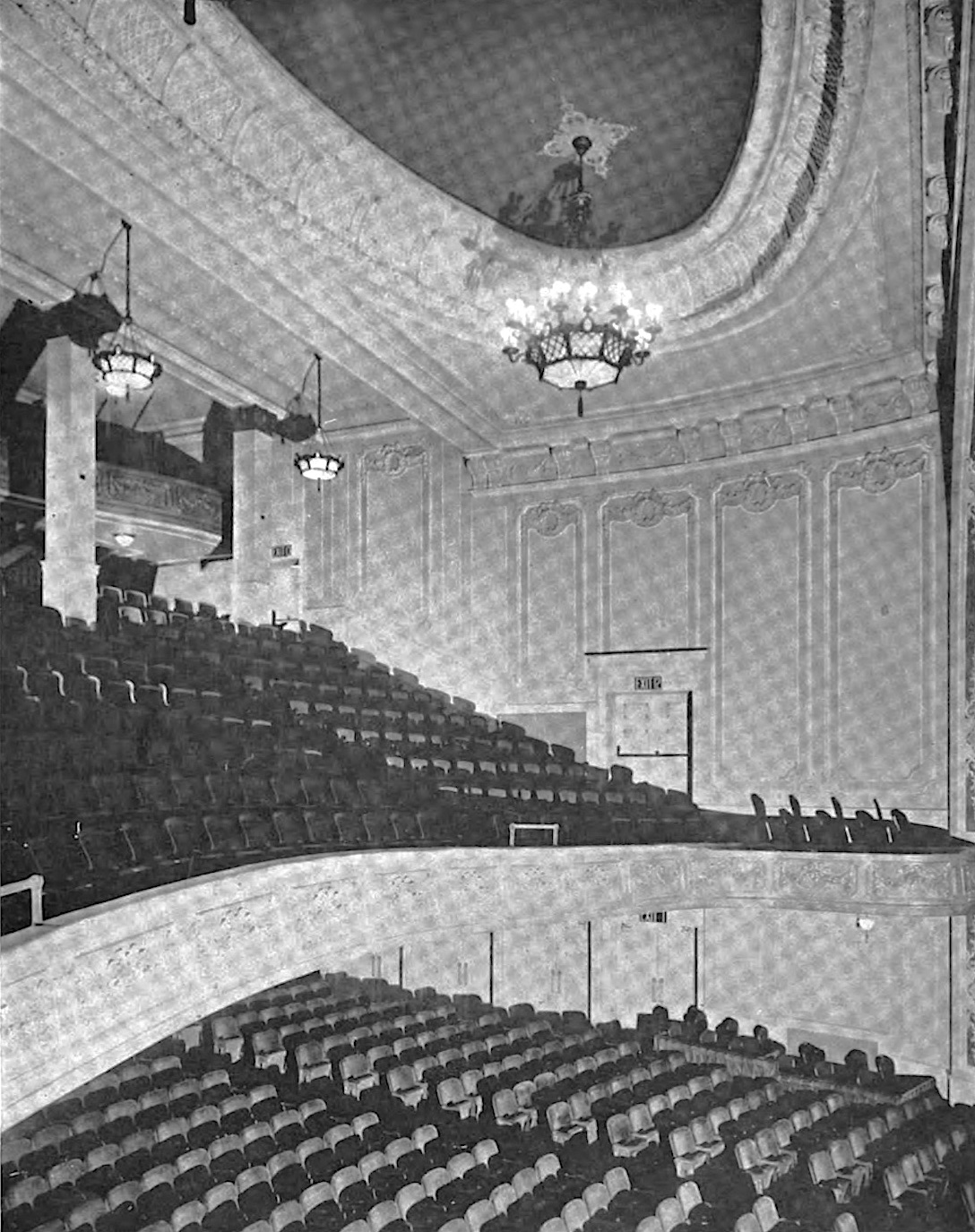
Central Theatre in 1918

Central Theatre was a Broadway theatre in Midtown Manhattan, New York City, built in 1918. It was located at 1567 Broadway, at the southwest corner with 47th Street, and seated approximately 1,100 patrons. The architect was Herbert J. Krapp. The theatre was built by the Shubert family on a site previously occupied by the Mathushek & Son piano factory.

The first production at the theatre was the play Forever After, by Owen Davis, which opened in 1918. This moved to Playhouse Theatre for a long run. A musical, Somebody's Sweetheart (music by Antonio Bafunno; book and lyrics by Alonzo Price), was a success at the theatre in 1919–20. Oscar Hammerstein II made his debut as librettist in January 1920 with Always You, which was followed by a successful revue by Arthur Wimperis, As You Were. In July 1920, Poor Little Ritz Girl opened, with some songs by Rodgers and Hart and others by Sigmund Romberg and Alex Gerber. Afgar was another successful musical in 1920–21. The Gingham Girl was a hit musical in 1923 with music by Albert Von Tilzer.

The theatre introduced movies in 1921 and alternated the new medium with live theatre and American burlesque until 1957, although legitimate theatre was absent from 1934 to 1951. It changed its name to the Columbia Theatre in 1934, Gotham Theatre in 1944 and the Holiday Theatre in 1951. A successful revue, Bagels and Yox played in 1951. A revival of Abie's Irish Rose played in 1954. Legitimate theatre ended at the house in 1956. Under the names Odeon, then the Forum, and finally Movieland, the theatre played movies until 1988, when the Shuberts sold it. The building was converted into other uses. The auditorium became a disco, Club USA. The theatre was demolished in 1998. A W Hotel opened on the site in 2005.
