= Charles Purcell =

Charles Purcell in 1919.

Charles Purcell (January 6, 1887 – March 20, 1962) was an American tenor and actor who was a popular leading performer in Broadway musicals and operettas from 1908 until 1934. He was most famous for playing Lieutenant Bumerli in The Chocolate Soldier in multiple Broadway revivals, and on tour. After many years absence from the New York stage, he returned for one final performance as Reggie Fox in the original production of Park Avenue in the 1946-1947 season. In his later life he worked as a voice teacher.

== Early life and education ==
The son of Charles E. Purcell and Mary "Molly" Purcell (nee Seiters), Charles Purcell was born in Tennessee on January 6, 1887. He attended primary school in Chattanooga until moving to Jackson, Tennessee while in the 5th grade. Several years later the family moved back to Chattanooga. In 1904 he began studies at the Cadek Conservatory of Music in Chattanooga where his voice teacher was Mrs. W. H. Pratt; appearing in the school's first public recitals in January 1905.

== Performance career ==
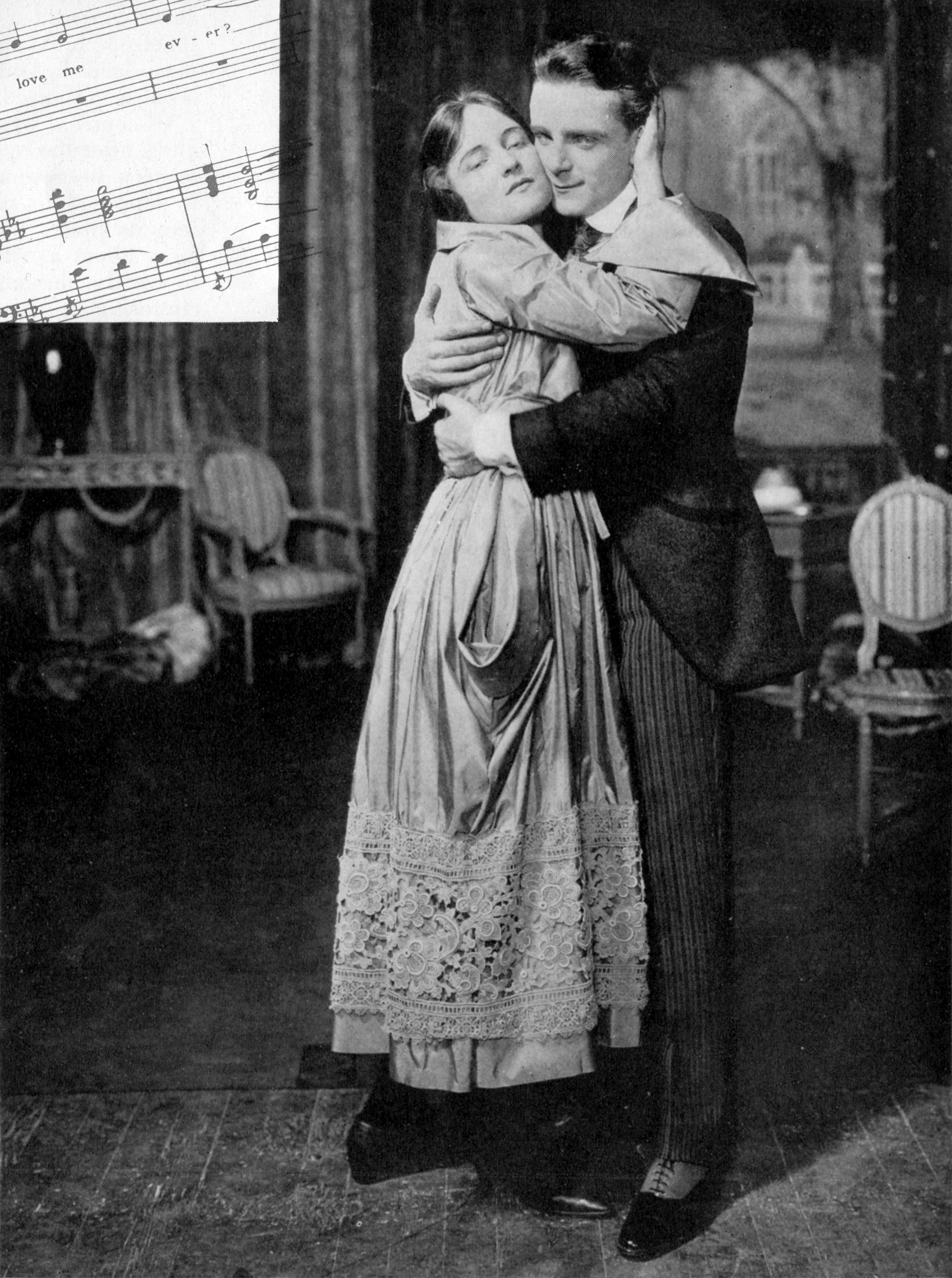
Charles Purcell embraces the actress Peggy Wood in the Broadway production of Maytime (1917).

Purcell had a career as a tenor in light operas and musicals. When the touring company of Ben Jerome's The Isle of Spice arrived in Chattanooga in 1906 there was an opening in the male chorus. Purcell auditioned and was given a place in the company. By April 1906 he had taken over the supporting role of Lieutenant Katchall in this show. He continued to tour nationally in the part in 1907-1908. He went to New York where he initially worked as a singing waiter at a Coney Island resort. He made his Broadway debut in 1908 as both Count Androssy and Lazlov in Reginald De Koven's The Golden Butterfly at the Broadway Theatre in which he sang the song "The Elf King".

Purcell first came to prominence in the part of Lieutenant Bumerli in The Chocolate Soldier; a role which was his signature part. He was so closely identified with this role that The New York Times reported in his obituary that he was cast in the part in 1909 for the show's original Broadway production. However, this was inaccurate as Jack E. Gardner played the part in the original cast. Purcell first played the part in New York in October 1911 at the Manhattan Opera House; in a production which toured both before and after it arrived in New York. He next played the part in a 1913 touring production of the operetta with Rena Vivienne as Nadina. He went on to play the part in numerous revivals of the operetta. This included playing the part in the 1930 (Jolson's 59th Street Theatre), 1931 (Erlanger's Theatre), and 1934 (St. James Theatre) Broadway revivals. He also sang the role with the Los Angeles Civic Light Opera in 1935.

In 1913 Purcell played Private Files in the West Coast tour of The Tik-Tok Man of Oz as a replacement cast member. He returned to Broadway as Forest Smith in Oliver Morosco's Pretty Mrs. Smith at the Casino Theatre in 1914. The following he performed in the Ziegfeld Follies of 1915 at the New Amsterdam Theatre in which his featured songs included "A Girl for Each Month of the Year", "Hello, Frisco!", and "My Radium Girl". In 1916 he returned to the Casino Theatre as Prince Nicholas Demidoff in Charles Cuvillier's Flora Bella with Lina Abarbanell as Princess Manja Demidoff.

Other original Broadway musicals Purcell performed in included My Lady's Glove (1917, as Captain Poildeau), Maytime (1917-1918, as Richard Wayne), The Melting of Molly (1918-1919, as John Moore), Monte Cristo Jr. (1919, as Monte/Dantes), The Magic Melody (1919-1920, as Captain Arthur Stanley / Beppo Corsini), Poor Little Ritz Girl (1920, as William Pembroke), The Rose Girl (1921, as Victor Marquis de la Roche), Dearest Enemy (1925-1926, Captain Sir John Copeland), Oh, Please! (1926-1927, as Robert Vandeleur), Judy (1927, as Jack Lethbridge), and Shady Lady (1933, as Richard Brandt). After several years absence from the New York stage he returned in the 1946-1947 season as Reggie Fox in Park Avenue at the Shubert Theatre.

While primarily a stage performer, Purcell portrayed Corporal Jenks in the film The Yanks Are Coming (1942).

== Personal life and death ==
Purcell was married to operatic soprano Elizabeth Valdes with whom he worked as a voice teacher. In 1947 they opened a voice studio in Oakland, California located in the City Club Hotel at 1428 Alice Street. They subsequently opened a voice studio in New York City in 1948. In 1951 they opened a second branch of this studio in Washington D.C. In the 1950s they co-staged amateur productions of light operas in Washington D.C. as co-directors the Capitol Opera Players.

Purcell died at Lenox Hill Hospital in Manhattan on March 20, 1962.
