= Charles Chaynes =

French composer (1925–2016)

Charles Augustin Chaynes (11 July 1925 – 24 June 2016) was a French composer.

== Biography ==
Chaynes was born in Toulouse in 1925. He studied at the Conservatoire de Paris with Darius Milhaud and Jean Rivier. In 1951 he won the Prix de Rome with the cantata Et l'homme se vit les portes rouvrir. During his stay at the Villa Medici in Rome he wrote the First Concerto for String Orchestra and the Ode for a Tragic Death.

In 1956 he became a producer at the Radiodiffusion Télévision Française (RTF). In 1964 he succeeded Marius Constant as head of the channel France Musique. From 1975 to 1990 he headed the service de la création musicale at Radio France.

In addition to several operas, one symphony and chamber works Chaynes composed numerous concertos, etc. for trumpet, violin, piano and organ, and two orchestral concerts. In 1966 he composed a concerto for organ, string orchestra, timpani and percussion for Marie-Claire Alain. His Piano Concerto was premiered in 1967 by Yvonne Loriod, the wife of Olivier Messiaen.

He died on 24 June 2016 in Saint-Mandé at the age of 90.

== Selected works ==
- Symphony (1955)
- Concerto for organ, string orchestra, timpani and percussion (1966)
- Piano Concerto (1966)
- Alternances for viola and piano (1966)
- Quatre Poèmes de Sappho (1968)
- Visions Concertantes for guitar and 12 strings (1979)

== Honours ==
Chaynes was inter alia the Grand Prix Musical of Paris (1965), the Prix du Disque of the Académie du disque français (1968, 1970, 1975 and 1981), the Prix de la Tribune internationale des compositeurs UNESCO (1976), the Prix Musical de la SACD (1988) and the Orphée d'Or of the Académie du Disque Lyrique (1996 and 2003). He was awarded officer of the Legion of Honour, the Ordre national du Mérite and Commander of the Ordre des Arts et des Lettres. In 2005 he became a member of the Académie des Beaux-Arts.

- Monaco : Commander of the Order of Cultural Merit (November 1999)
