= 1925 in British music =

This is a summary of 1925 in music in the United Kingdom.

== Events ==
- 3 April – Gustav Holst's opera At the Boar's Head is premiered in Manchester.
- date unknown
  - After a spell of ill-health, Gustav Holst returns to teach at St Paul's Girls' School.
  - William Walton dedicates the score of his Portsmouth Point to his patron Siegfried Sassoon, who had recommended it be published by Oxford University Press.

== Popular music ==
- Mai Jones – "Blackbirds"

== Classical music: new works ==
- Frank Bridge –
  - "Golden Hair", for voice and piano
  - "Journey's End", for tenor or high baritone and piano
  - The Pneu World, for cello and piano
  - Songs of Rabindranath Tagore (3), for voice and piano, or voice and orchestra
  - Vignettes de Marseille, for piano
  - Winter Pastorale, for piano
- Eric Coates – 2 Light Syncopated Pieces
- Walford Davies – Men and Angels, for chorus and orchestra, Op. 51
- Frederick Delius – A Late Lark, for voice and orchestra
- Edward Elgar –
  - "The Herald", part-song
  - "The Prince of Sleep", part-song
- Gustav Holst –
  - "God Is Love, His the Care", for choir
  - Hymns (4) for Songs of Praise, for choir
  - Motets (2), for choir
  - Ode to C.K.S. and the Oriana, for choir
  - Terzetto for flute, oboe and viola
- Herbert Howells – Piano Concerto No. 2
- John Ireland – Two Pieces for Piano (1925)
- Ernest John Moeran – Bank Holiday
- Ralph Vaughan Williams –
  - Concerto Accademico for violin and strings
  - Flos Campi, for viola, wordless choir, and small orchestra
  - Hymns (5) for Songs of Praise, for choir
  - Two Poems by Seumas O'Sullivan, for voice and piano
  - Three Songs from Shakespeare, for voice and piano
  - Three Poems by Walt Whitman, for baritone and piano
- William Walton – Portsmouth Point, concert overture
- Peter Warlock – "A Prayer to St Anthony"

== Opera ==
- Armstrong Gibbs – Blue Peter
- Gustav Holst – At the Boar's Head

== Musical theatre ==
- Betty in Mayfair, with music by Harold Fraser-Simson and lyrics by Harry Graham
- Charlot's Revue of 1925
- Dear Little Billie, with music by H.B. Hedley & Jack Strachey and lyrics by Desmond Carter
- Love's Prisoner with music, book and lyrics by Reginald Hargreaves
- On with the Dance, written and composed by Noël Coward and Philip Braham

== Publications ==
- William Wallace – Richard Wagner as he lived

== Births ==
- 17 February – Ron Goodwin, film composer (d. 2003)
- 8 March – Dennis Lotis, South African-born singer (d. 2023)
- 22 March – Gerard Hoffnung, cartoonist, comedian, musician (d. 1959)
- 23 March – Monica Sinclair, operatic contralto (d. 2002)
- 18 June – Johnny Pearson, composer, orchestra leader and pianist (d. 2011)
- 2 September – Russ Conway, pianist (d. 2000)
- 20 September – James Bernard, film composer (d. 2001)
- 1 October – Alan Styler, operatic baritone (d. 1970)
- 11 October – David Hughes, operatic tenor (d. 1972)
- 30 December – Eric Wetherell, composer, conductor, musical author (died 2021)
- 31 December – Daphne Oram, composer and electronic musician (d. 2003)

== Deaths ==
- 1 March – Thomas Bidgood, conductor, composer and arranger, 66 (suicide)
- 22 March – Marie Brema, concert mezzo-soprano, 69
- 1 April – Francis William Davenport, composer and music writer

== See also ==
- 1925 in the United Kingdom
- List of British films of 1925
