= Robert Donley =

American artist

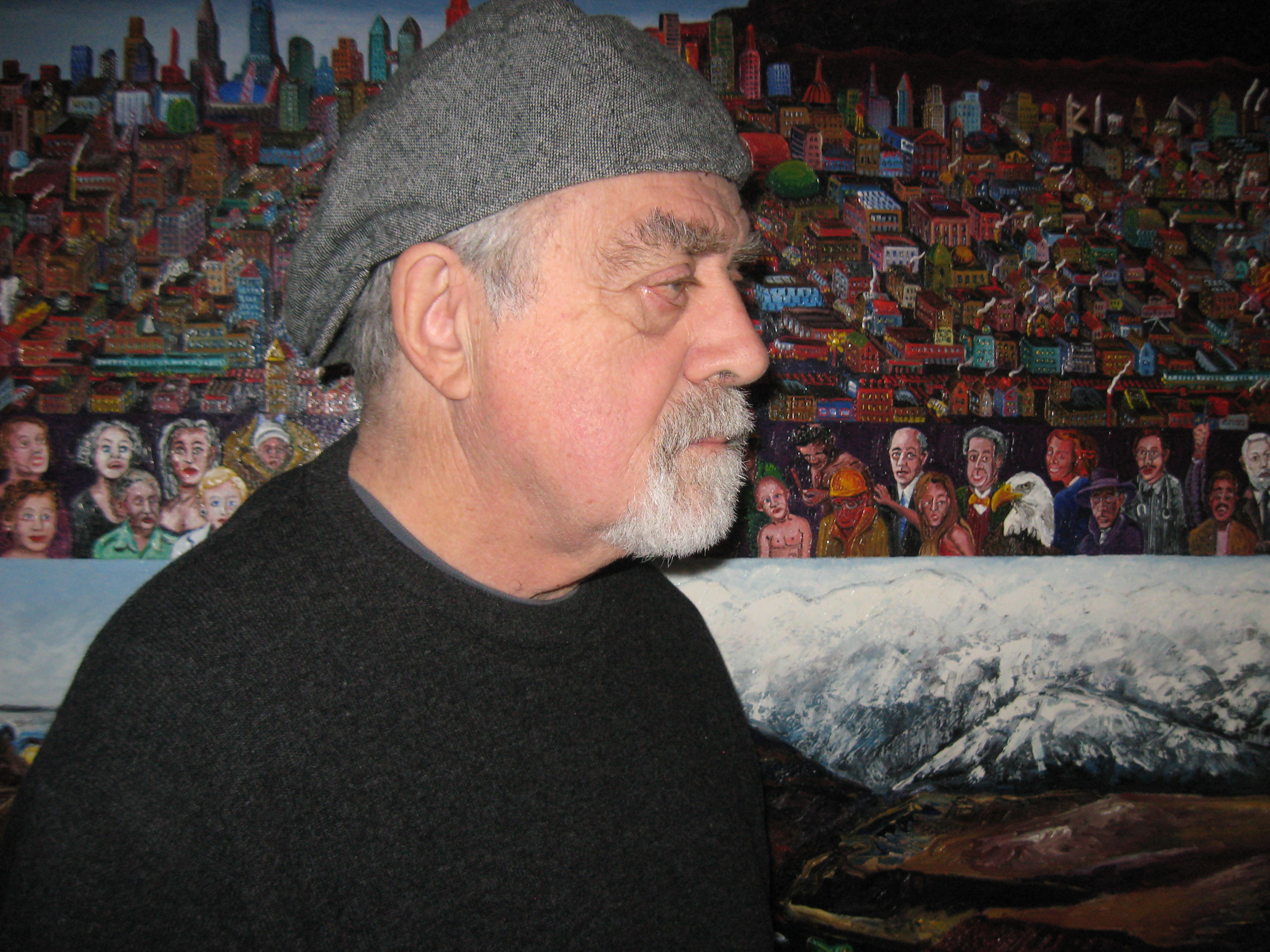
- Born: 1934 (age 91–92); Cleveland, Ohio, United States
- Education: School of the Art Institute of Chicago
- Known for: Painting
- Style: Figurative Imagist
- Website: http://www.robertdonley.com

Robert Morris Donley (born 1934) is an American artist who has been identified with the Chicago Imagist movement. Judith Wilson of the Village Voice called him the "Chicago imagist Tolstoy." The narrative aspects of his work center on broad social and political statements that are complex--often playful and satirical with respect to ways in which propaganda, power, and social diversity mix with and conflict with historical and religious personalities. In his career retrospective in 2000 at the Chicago Cultural Center, Dr. Paul Jaskot wrote that "his art investigates the changing political and social geographies of [the modern] city."

Donley has spent most of his career in Chicago, where his work was exhibited in shows at the Museum of Contemporary Art, Art Institute of Chicago, the Peace Museum, Hyde Park Art Center, and numerous other group and solo exhibitions. He started his professional career in Los Angeles at the Paul Plummer Gallery and was later represented by Monique Knowlton in New York City. Donley was a chair and full professor of art at DePaul University. John Russell of the New York Times wrote of his work that "You will have an approximate idea of the teeming and endlessly pugnacious human scene that Robert Donley sets before us... It has the fascination of perpetual motion."

== Life and career ==
Donley was born in Cleveland, Ohio in 1934 and moved to Chicago when he was ten. His mother, Ann Donley, worked for an art studio and his father, Robert Morris Donley, Sr., had his own creative career. In 1955, Donley enrolled at the School of the Art Institute of Chicago (SAIC) where he studied under Boris Margo, Edgard Pillet, and Thomas Kapsalis.

After graduating with a BFA from the SAIC in 1959, he moved to Los Angeles. During this time, he spent several months traveling around Mexico, living in San Miguel Allende, Puebla, and Mexico City. In 1964, he returned to Chicago and earned his MFA from the SAIC, and his art shifted from abstract to figurative imagism. Upon graduation from the SAIC, he was represented by Nancy Lurie Gallery in Chicago and later by Monique Knowlton in New York City; and Frumkin Struve, Hokin Kaufman, and Gruen Gallery in Chicago. Currently, he is represented by Corbett vs. Dempsey.

He taught in the Department of Art and Art History at DePaul University and stayed there for his entire thirty-three year teaching career.

== Art work ==
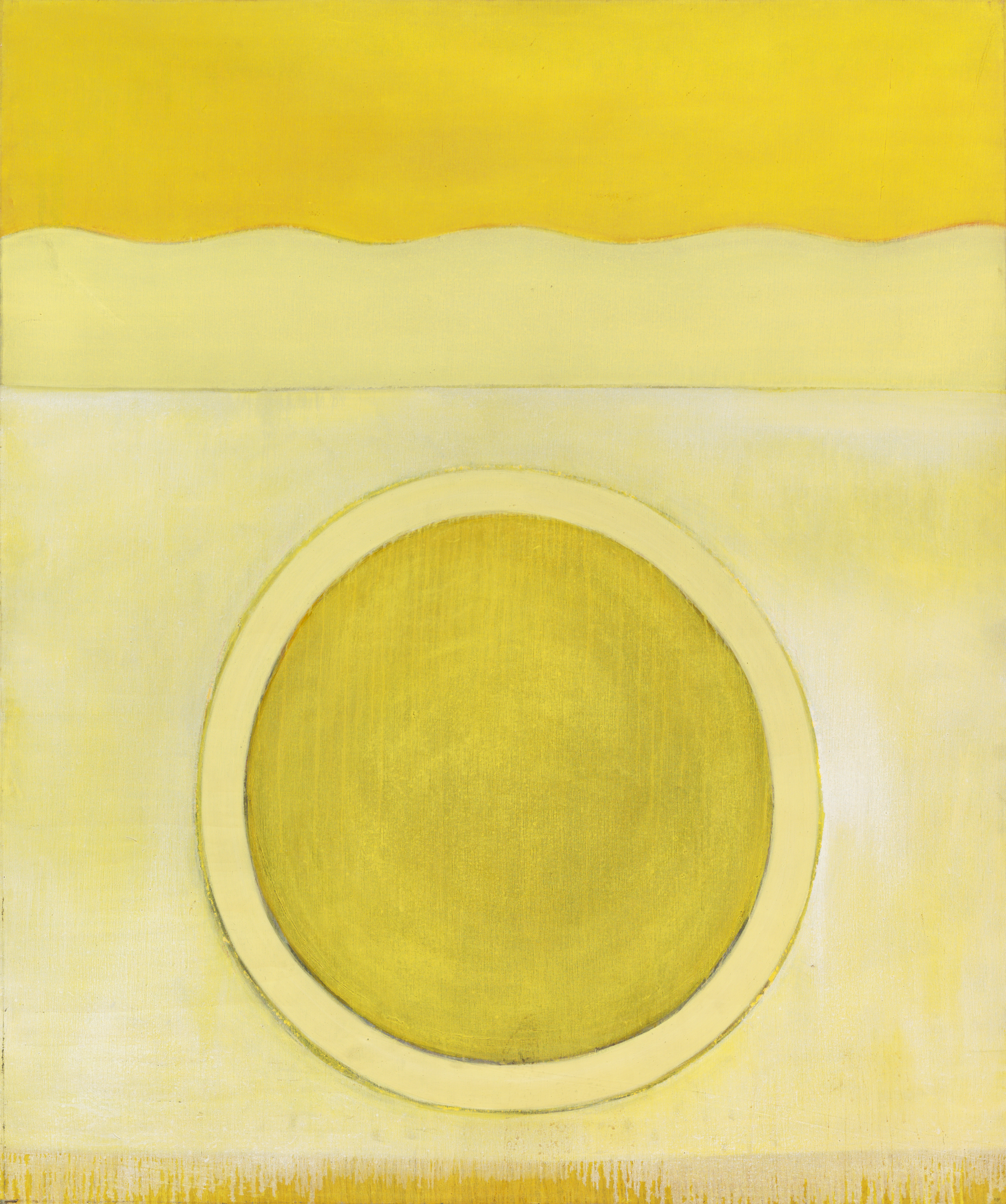
California Heat, 1959, oil on canvas, 66' x 52"

=== California Color Field paintings ===
Donley moved to Hollywood, California in the winter of 1959. The environment was foreign, and that came through in his work. Influenced by the light, which was different from Chicago, his paintings took on a new shape. The circle became a big motif, representing the heat, the ever-present sun, even in winter. It was enough to change his style of art completely. He discovered artists like Bruce Conner and Ed Kienholz and saw Andy Warhol in the Ferus Gallery. It was shocking and new and helped him move towards the California Color Field Paintings. He exhibited these works in several shows at the Los Angeles County Museum of Art and the Paul Plummer Gallery. In 2009, they were shown again at Corbett vs. Dempsey in Chicago. Paul Klein of the Huffington Post wrote that these works show a "fascinating look not only at the differences that exist between L.A. and Chicago, but also the effect of place on one artist."

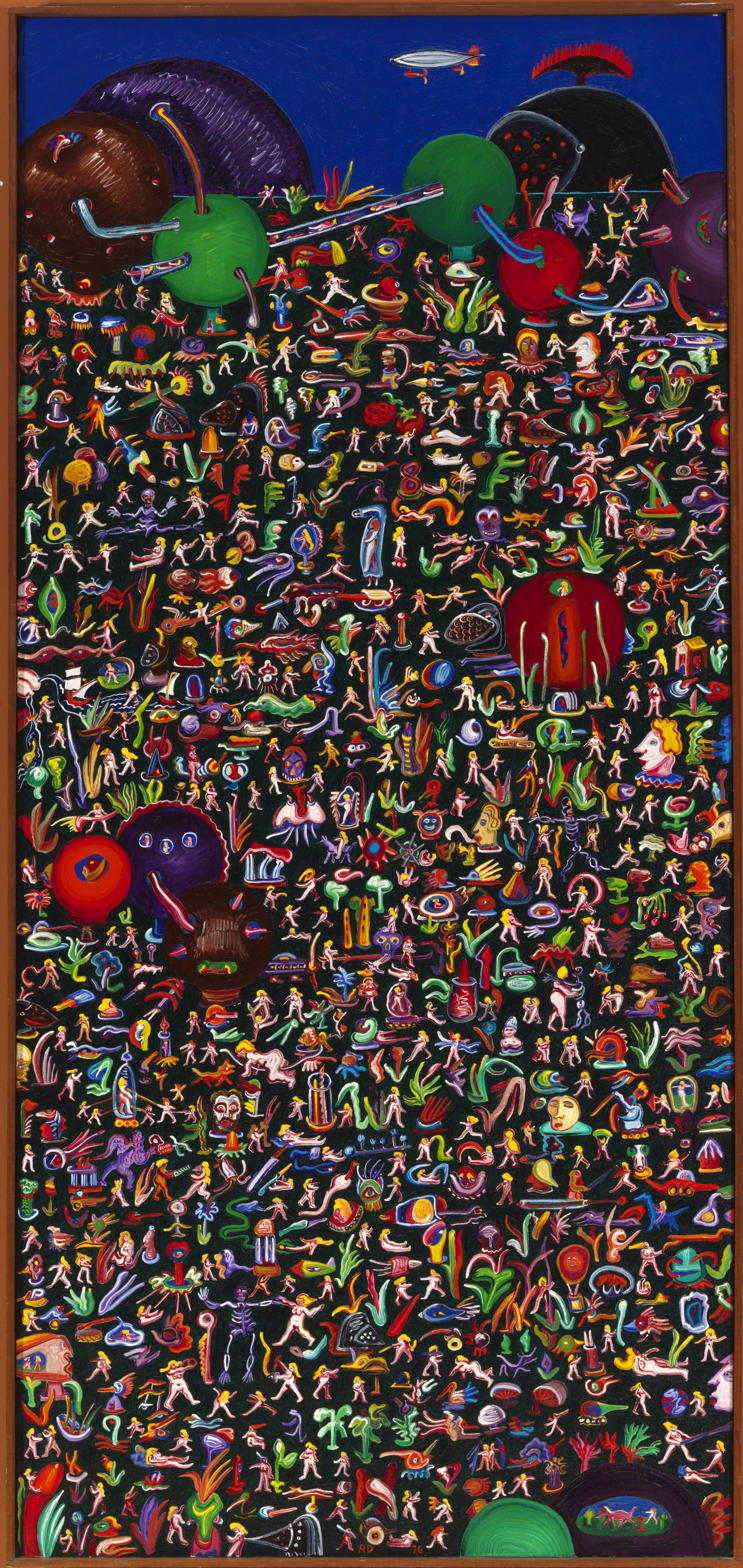
Abundance, 1976, oil on canvas, 52" x 24"

=== Chicago figurative imagist ===
Upon return to Chicago, Donley's art changed again. He became interested in other images, "multiple images." Color was still important, but there was no universal symbol, no motif. Instead, he took what he learned in California and shifted his focus mainly to the figurative image in a landscape. In the 1970s, his work took on a "surrealist edge" where surrealism was combined "with an interest in historical, mythological, and literary themes, producing works painted in a naive style and peopled by tiny, caricatured figures." This was most evident in the work he exhibited at Nancy Lurie's Gallery in Chicago. These were large paintings crammed full of tiny figures. Helen and her Suitors was one of these and was awarded the Mr. and Mrs. Frank G. Logan Prize in 1977. Joshua Kind described these works as such:

Icarus, 2004, oil on canvas, 40" x 48"

"Donley's landscapes-of-the-mind organize earth, sea, and sky into foreground, middleground, and background according to the conventions of overlap. But Donley's concern is surface, not space... Each of these fascinating individual events contributes to the overall structure and texture of his field and each is painted in wonderfully controlled finger gestures of multiple-color loaded brush strokes."

In 1980, he opened his first one-person show in New York at the Monique Knowlton Gallery, exhibiting a collection of paintings depicting his interpretation of World War II. Judith Wilson of the Village Voice wrote that "Once you're nose-deep in his [Donley's] world at war, it's hard not to be taken captive. Like Hieronymus Bosch, to whom he's been compared, or fellow Chicagoan Roger Brown, who also stages miniaturized dramas, Donley makes us voyeurs." In a later show in New York, Guy Trebay said of his paintings that "The skies are full of planes, the grounds are overpopulated with myriad tiny trees, people, monuments, and buildings. You'll barely recognize New York, Washington, Paris, and Moscow mapped out amidst all the horror of vacui--but that's exactly the charm of these primitivistic patterned paintings." In a review of this show in ArtForum magazine, Ronny Cohen wrote that "From a distance, the paintings bold rhythms of color and line contrast demonstrating the beauty of war concept glorified by the Futurists. Close-up the paintings look like many of the wargames that we played as children with toy armies... Donley succeeds at making us play along in his war games and at eliciting our active responses."

St. Patrick's Parade, 1983, oil on canvas, 50" x 40"

The city became a more important image in his work from 1982 onward and especially the city he knew most, Chicago. The city's "history, politics, sports, architecture, and diverse ethnic traditions" all factored into his compositions. The Chicago Cubs appear in several paintings. Mayor Washington leads the St. Patrick's Day parade down Michigan Avenue in St. Patrick's Day (1983). Street of Big Dreams (1983) captures the grid street plan of the city along with some of its famous buildings. New York was an important subject matter as well; Donley filled large canvases with the architecture of that city and portraits of New Yorkers: the street vendors, policemen, tourists, the Mets and the Yankees. These urban landscapes continued to evolve and change. The compositions took on more figures, both actual people from the cities and those from Donley's imagination. The figures also became larger, sometimes eclipsing the buildings. There are still tiny figures on the streets, but these are often cartoonish and engaging in activities that are "positively bizarre." Like the work in the 1970s, they are still crammed with images, "buildings, cars, and people," but the focus is the city. In the late 1990s, Donley was still working with images of the city. As James Yood wrote in Artforum, "Donley has chosen a grand, challenging, and unwieldy theme for his work... no less than the life of the modern city, as manifested in its buildings and in its residents." But by this point, Chicago and New York were not his only subject matter. He also painted Las Vegas, Los Angeles, San Francisco, and most recently, Portland, Oregon. As Donley said in a 1990 article, he has "always been fascinated by the energy of the city in both its growth and decay."

=== Protest art ===
In 1968, Donley marched with other artists at the Democratic National Convention in Chicago, an event that pitted police against anti-Vietnam protestors in a bloody battle that changed the course of history and affected many artists, including Donley. At the same time he was marching, two of his two anti-war paintings, LBJ and Tank Attack were being displayed at the Armory on South Wabash Avenue. The year prior, he created one of the pieces in the Protest Papers, a bound portfolio of 20 black-and-white serigraphs published by the Artists Collaborative to protest the U.S. "policy of mass destruction in Vietnam." Donley was one of five directors of the Artists Collaborative and also involved with Dominick Di Meo, Donald Main, and Jim Falconer in the Chicago branch of Artists against the War in Vietnam.

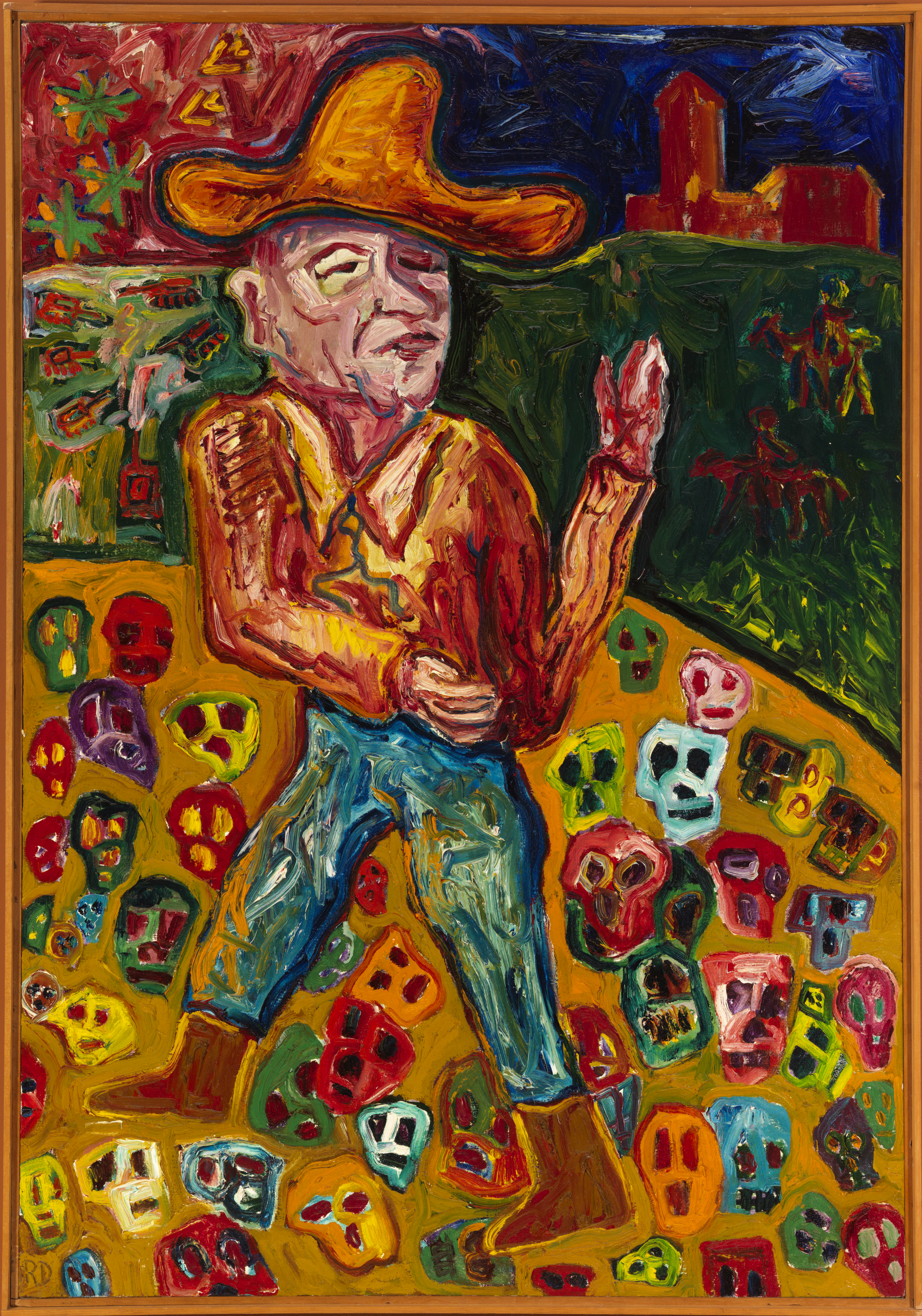
LBJ, 1968, oil on canvas, 46" x 31"

Through the 1960s and 1970s, Donley remained active in civil rights and anti-war protests. After this time, Donley's involvement in protest art continued. In 1982, his painting On Target, was part of the Atomic Salon: Artists Against Nuclear War at Feldman Gallery in New York to bring awareness to nuclear disarmament. In 1983, Capitulation was exhibited in Chicago Area Artists of Peace at the Peace Museum in Chicago in an effort to bring awareness to peace in the midst of the Cold War. In the same year, his work was exhibited at Nexus Gallery in Atlanta, Georgia in "What Artists Have to Say about Nuclear War". A year later, his work was shown in Artists Call Against Intervention in Central America at Frumkin Struve Gallery in Chicago. In the late 1990s, East Side, West Side traveled throughout Southeast Asia and China as part of a show to build a "new bridge between different cultures... [and, thus] seek to contribute to the larger goal of greater global harmony in the twenty-first century."

== Teaching career ==
Donley's 35-year teaching career started in 1967 when he was hired by Morris Barazani to teach painting, art history, art appreciation, and etching at DePaul University. Donley became a tenured professor and then department chair, which he held for 12 years starting in 1984.

In 2001, Donley was awarded a DePaul University Research Grant and the Via Sapientiae Award.

In 2002, he retired as professor emeritus.

== Awards and collections ==
Donley has been the recipient of the Mr. and Mrs. Frank G. Logan Prize in 1977, the Pauline Palmer Prize Winner in 1990, and a National Endowment for the Arts Grant in 1980. In 1990, he was asked by U.S. News & World Report to serve as a judge for the "Best of America" edition of the magazine.

His work appears in the National Gallery of Art, Boeing Corporation, State of Illinois Building, First National Bank in Chicago, DePaul University, and Mobil Oil Corporation in New York.
