= Helen Ford =

American actress (1894–1982)

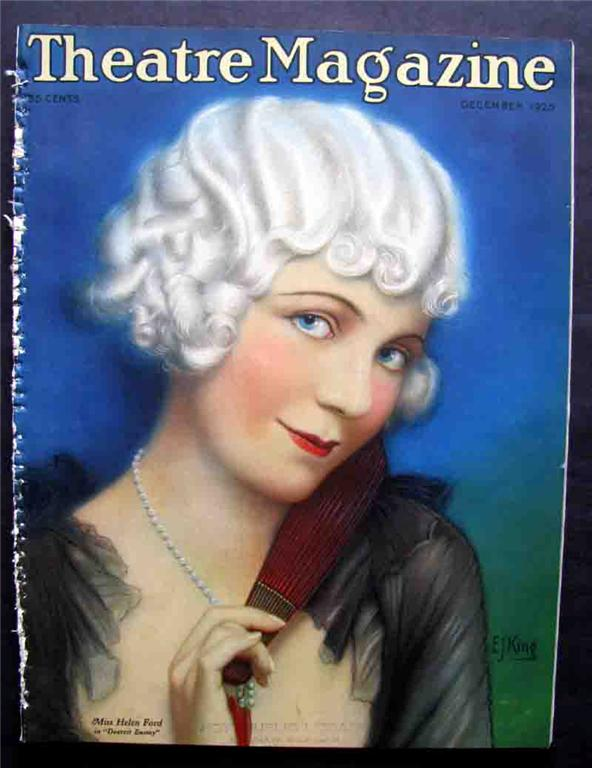
Helen Ford on the cover of Theatre Magazine December 1925

Helen Ford (born Helen Isabel Barnett; June 6, 1894 –January 19, 1982) was an American actress. A native of Troy, New York, she trained as a singer and pianist at a music conservatory in her native city. She began her career as a musical theatre actress in 1918 and was active in Broadway musicals from that point into the 1930s. She was a frequent collaborator with Rodgers and Hart; creating the title roles in Peggy-Ann (1926) and Chee-Chee (1928) as well as starring in Dearest Enemy (1925). In her later career she worked in television and film.

== Biography ==
Helen Ford was born Helen Isabel Barnett in Troy, New York on June 6, 1894. Her father was a manufacturer in Troy, and she was considered a musical prodigy as a child. She studied voice and piano at a conservatory of music in her native city. She first appeared in a production of The Heart of Annie Wood in New York in 1918. The following year she joined the Broadway cast of Rudolf Friml's Sometime at the Casino Theatre in the role of Enid Vaughn. On August 9, 1918, she married George Ford, who produced touring Shakespearean festivals.

Ford was a stage actress in Broadway musicals of the 1920s and 1930s. In 1920 she portrayed Natalie Blythe in Hugo Felix's musical The Sweetheart Shop at the Knickerbocker Theatre. That same year she had the role of Toinette Fontaine in Always You, Oscar Hammerstein's first musical. In 1922 she performed the roles of Marjorie Leeds in William Merrigan Daly's For Goodness Sake at the Lyric Theatre, and Mary Thompson in Albert Von Tilzer's The Gingham Girl at the Earl Carroll Theatre. In 1923 she starred in the title role of Harry Ruby and Bert Kalmar's Helen of Troy, New York at first the Selwyn Theatre and later Times Square Theatre. This was followed by another Ruby and Kalmar musical, No Other Girl (1924), in which she appeared as Hope Franklin at the Morosco Theatre.

A "Rodgers, Hart, and Fields' favorite", Ford starred in three of their Broadway productions: Dearest Enemy (1925, as Betsy Burke), Peggy-Ann (1926, as Peggy-Ann) and Chee-Chee (1928, as Chee-Chee). She also starred in the touring production of Dearest Enemy. In 1926, Ford was involved in a court case in District Court in New York City. The trial related to her appearance at the Knickerbocker Theater "clad only in a barrel". The trial focused on whether her husband, George Ford, had committed perjury when he told a grand jury that the barrel did not contain champagne.

In 1933-1934 Ford played the role of Adele in the Broadway musical Champagne, Sec; a production which began at the Morosco Theatre and then transferred to the Shubert Theatre before ending its run at the 44th Street Theatre. She returned to Broadway as Freelove Clark in Frederick Loewe's 1938 musical Great Lady which had a short run at the Majestic Theatre. She went on to appear in films and television programs, including The Raid.

She died of a stroke on January 19, 1982. She was cremated and her ashes interred in the crypt below the chapel at Grand View Memorial Park Cemetery in Glendale, California.

== Filmography ==
Year	Title	Role	Notes
1948	Apartment for Peggy	Della	Uncredited
1951	The Model and the Marriage Broker	Emmy Swasey	
1952	Secret People	Scarf Woman	
1952	Sound Off	Mrs. Rafferty	Uncredited
1954	The Raid	Delphine Coates	
1957	The Curse of Frankenstein	Ellen	Uncredited
1957	Hell Drivers	Woman at Dance	Uncredited
1957	The Naked Truth	Dinner Guest	Uncredited
1958	A Night to Remember	Steerage Passenger	Uncredited
1960	Village of the Damned	Villager	Uncredited
1966	The Ghost Goes Gear	An Old Lady	Uncredited
1967	Carry On Doctor	Nurse	
1971	A Clockwork Orange	Old Lady at Duke of York	Scene deleted
1975	Confessions of a Pop Performer	Old Lady with Ear Trumpet	(final film role)
