= Jordan Charney =

American character actor (born 1937)

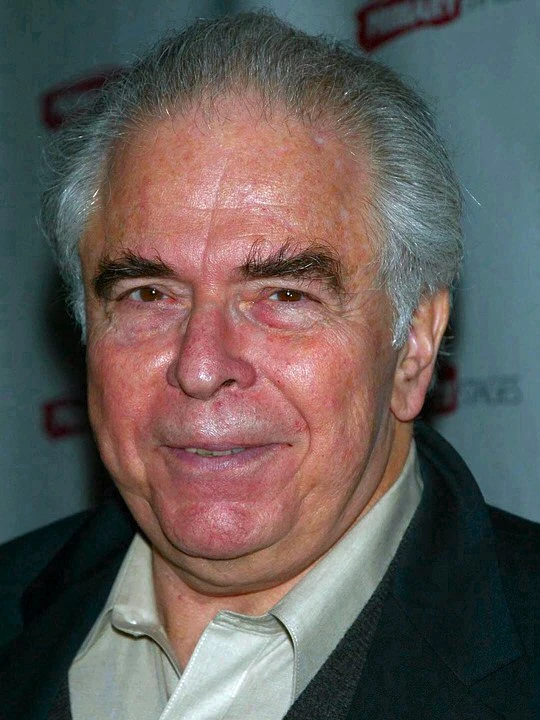
- Born: April 1, 1937 (age 89); Brooklyn, New York, U.S.
- Education: Abraham Lincoln High School; Brooklyn College (1960)
- Occupation: Actor
- Years active: 1961–2007
- Height: 6 ft 1 in (185 cm)
- Spouse: Nancy Cooperstein (m. 1966)
- Children: 2
- Parents: Abraham Charney (father); Rose Resnick (mother)
- Relatives: Barbara Schreier (sister)

Jordan Charney (born April 1, 1937) is an American character actor known for Ghostbusters (1984), Network (1976) and Hill Street Blues (1981).

== Early life ==
Charney was born in Brooklyn, New York, on April 1, 1937, the son of Rose—née Resnick—and Abraham Charney. He is a graduate of Abraham Lincoln High School and of Brooklyn College, where, in November 1957 and 1958, respectively, he portrayed the title character in productions of Coxe and Chapman's Billy Budd—adapted from Melville's like-named novel—and of Sophocles' tragedy, Oedipus Rex. Majoring in speech and theatre, while also reinforcing his studies via summer stock engagements (primarily with the Woodstock Playhouse), Charney earned his BA in 1960 and made his Off-Broadway debut the following April in Edward Albee's Zoo Story, replacing Peter Mark Richman as Jerry. In 1962, Charney sought to further his education, as part of the Lincoln Center Training Program.

== Career ==
Many of Charney's earliest screen roles were on daytime television, with appearances in numerous soaps. Charney created the role of creepy Julian Dark in the early to mid-1960s on the CBS soap, The Secret Storm. He played Sam Lucas, a former convict who became a lawyer, in both Another World and its spin-off Somerset, playing the role from 1967 to 1974. He also appeared as Lt. Vince Wolek on One Life to Live (1975–1977). Other roles were on Love of Life and All My Children.

Charney portrayed newspaper editor Ted Bergman in the 1977 CBS series The Andros Targets. In 1980, he played Capt. Roger Westerby, an old flame of Corabeth Godsey, in a season eight episode of The Waltons. He had a recurring role as Frank Angelino, Jack Tripper's boss, on Three's Company (1981–1983). He is often cast as a judge, attorney, prison warden, or police officer. He has made appearances on Knots Landing,Falcon Crest, Dynasty, Night Court and 100 Centre Street, among many other series. He can also be seen in the recurring role of Judge Donald Karan on Law & Order.

In 1982, Charney portrayed renowned theatre director and drama critic Harold Clurman in Universal's Frances Farmer biopic (alongside Jessica Lange as Farmer and Jeffrey DeMunn as Clifford Odets); he has also appeared in such films as The Hospital, Network, and Ghostbusters, and acted on the CBS Radio Mystery Theater.

1982 also marked the beginning of Charney's tenure as artistic director of Actors Alley theater in the San Fernando Valley in California. By November 1986 the group's membership had grown from 22 when he arrived to 70. It offered weekly classes for members and presented both free and paid-admission plays for the public.

== Personal life ==
Charney married television director / theatrical producer Nancy Cooperstein in November 1966. They have two children, including opera singer Allison Charney, and five grandchildren.

== Filmography ==
=== Film ===
Year	Title	Role	Notes
1971	Plaza Suite	Jesse's Aide	Uncredited
1971	The Hospital	Hitchcock	
1976	Network	Harry Hunter	
1980	Those Lips, Those Eyes	Professor	
1980	Witches' Brew	Charlie Reynolds	
1981	Separate Ways	Harry Bartoff	
1982	Frances	Harold Clurman	
1984	Ghostbusters	Dean Yeager	
1985	Creator	Dr. Whitaker	
1986	My Little Girl	Dr. Gruner	
2001	Queenie in Love	Father	
2007	Mo	Dr. Leahman	
2007	Anamorph	Chairman	

=== Television ===
Year	Title	Role	Notes
1965	The Magnificent Yankee	Halloran	Television film
1965	Love of Life	Dr. Tony Vento	18 episodes
1966	Hawk	Intern	Episode: "Death Comes Full Circle"
1967–1974	Another World	Sam Lucas	10 episodes
1970	Somerset	Sam Lucas	Episode #1.1
1974	Guiding Light	Dr. Harold Eberhart	3 episodes
1976–1977	One Life to Live	Vince Wolek #2	24 episodes
1977	The Andros Targets	Ted Bergman	Television film
1978	Who'll Save Our Children?	John Drake	Television film
1979	Dallas	Lieutenant Sutton / Detective Rollins	2 episodes
1979–1983	Three's Company	Frank Angelino / Mr. Layton	12 episodes
1980	Marriage Is Alive and Well	Fritz	Television film
1980	The Waltons	Capt. Roger Westerby	Episode: "The Medal"
1980	The Ropers	Mr. McLaughlin	Episode: "The Other Woman"
1980	The Plutonium Incident	Mr. Orr	Television film
1981	Lou Grant	Karl Buckner	Episode: "Catch"
1981	Benson	Jack Beddoes	Episode: "The Governor's House Call"
1981	Private Benjamin	Capt. Hookstratten	Episode: "Judy Got Her Gun"
1981–1982	General Hospital	Dr. Seymour Katz	13 episodes
1981–1985	Hill Street Blues	Ed Chapel / Marty Dignan	4 episodes
1982	Hart to Hart	Mr. Flowers	Episode: "Blue and Broken-Harted"
1983	Blood Feud	TV Commentator	Television film
1983	Tucker's Witch	Max Leopold	Episode: "Formula for Revenge"
1984	Amazons	Congressman Harris Stowe	Television film
1984	Ernie Kovacs: Between the Laughter	Harry Ascot	Television film
1984	Falcon Crest	Norton Crane	6 episodes
1984	E/R	Donald	Episode: "Son of Sheinfeld"
1984	The Cartier Affair	Ben Foley	Television film
1984	The Impostor	Barela	Television film
1985	Robert Kennedy and His Times	Arthur M. Schlesinger Jr.	3 episodes
1985	Kids Don't Tell	Tatum	Television film
1985	T. J. Hooker	Captain Pankowitz	Episode: "The Chicago Connection"
1985	Do You Remember Love	Marvin Langdon	Television film
1985	Santa Barbara	Dr. Renfro	23 episodes
1985	Amos	Commissioner Bert Daniels	Television film
1985	Hunter	Stu	Episode: "Killer in a Halloween Mask"
1985	Crime of Innocence	Spencer Mulholland	Television film
1985	Final Jeopardy	Mr. Clemens	Television film
1985	Glitter	Vincent	Episode: "Nightfall"
1985	Misfits of Science	Dr. Moyer	Episode: "Grand Theft Bunny"
1986	Samaritan: The Mitch Snyder Story	Pete Stark	Television film
1986	Our House	Judge Albert	Episode: "See You in Court"
1987	Shell Game	Bob Kenton	Episode: "Norman's Parking Ticket"
1987	Rags to Riches	Harvey	Episode: "Born to Ride"
1987	Home Fires	Hal Robinson	Television film
1987	Highway to Heaven	Joe Eastwood	Episode: "In with the 'In' Crowd"
1987–1988	Dynasty	Bill Cochran	5 episodes
1987, 1991	L.A. Law	Joseph Gennis / Samuel Adelson	2 episodes
1988	Knots Landing	Abby's Lawyer	Episode: "Lawfully Wedded"
1988	Baja Oklahoma	Beecher Perry	Television film
1988	The Bronx Zoo	Mr. Ted Sharf	Episode: "Behind Closed Doors"
1988	The Town Bully	Harmon Gunderson	Television film
1988	To Heal a Nation	Spreiregen	Television film
1988	David	Judge	Television film
1988	Night Court	James McCracken	Episode: "The Night Court Before Christmas"
1989	Capone Behind Bars	J. Edgar Hoover	Television film
1989	When He's Not a Stranger	Chancellor Hammond	Television film
1989	Matlock	Warden Paul Branden	2 episodes
1990	Mancuso, F.B.I.	Jiri	2 episodes
1990	All My Children	Kurt Bodine	11 episodes
1991	Her Wicked Ways	Bernie Robbins	Television film
1992–2006	Law & Order	Judge Donald Karan / Dr. Mandell	9 episodes
1994	One West Waikiki	Dr. Howard Braniff / Pathologist	2 episodes
1995	The Boys Are Back	Bill	Episode: "The French Class"
1995	Chicago Hope	Mr. Harrod	Episode: "The Ethics of Hope"
1996	Innocent Victims	Judge	Television film
1996	Baywatch	Charlie	Episode: "Baywatch Angels"
1997	Touched by an Angel	Official	Episode: "Charades"
2001	100 Centre Street	Judge Kelleher	5 episodes
2002	Law & Order: Criminal Intent	Melvin Colter	Episode: "Homo Homini Lupus"
2002	Law & Order: Special Victims Unit	Rory O'Halloran	Episode: "Silence"
