= Billy Budd (disambiguation) =

Billy Budd is a novella by Herman Melville.

Billy Budd can also refer to:

- Billy Budd (film), a 1962 film produced, directed, and co-written by Peter Ustinov, based on Melville's novel
- Billy Budd (opera), a 1951 opera by Benjamin Britten based on Melville's novel
- Billy Budd (stage play), a 1949 play by Louis O. Coxe and Robert H. Chapman, originally titled Uniform of Flesh
- Billy Budd (TV play), a 1955 American television play based on the novel
- "Billy Budd", a 1994 song from Morrissey's album Vauxhall and I
