= Schlitz Playhouse of Stars =

US television series 1951-1959

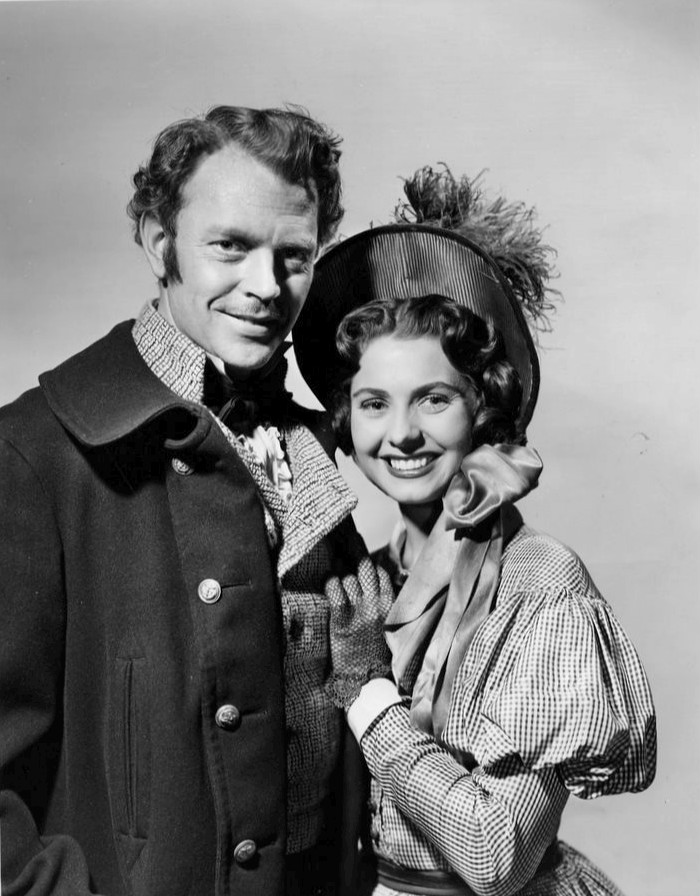
- Dan O'Herlihy and Peggy Creel in "Log the Man Innocent", 1955
- Also known as: Schlitz Playhouse
- Genre: Anthology
- Directed by: Robert Aldrich; John Brahm; David Butler; Robert Florey; Paul Henreid; Arthur Hiller; Delbert Mann; Lewis Milestone; Ray Milland; James Neilson; Christian Nyby; Ted Post; Robert Stevenson; Jacques Tourneur; Don Weis; Richard Whorf
- Composers: Melvyn Lenard; Paul Dunlap; Stanley Wilson
- Country of origin: United States
- Original language: English
- No. of seasons: 8
- No. of episodes: 347

Production
- Executive producer: Nat Holt
- Producers: William Self; Frank P. Rosenberg; Jules Bricken
- Production location: Revue Studios
- Cinematography: George T. Clemens; Russell Harlan
- Editors: Joseph Gluck; Richard Belding; Sam Gold; George Amy; Robert B. Warwick, Jr.
- Camera setup: Single-camera
- Running time: 50 minutes
- Production companies: Meridian Productions; Revue Studios

Original release
- Network: CBS
- Release: October 5, 1951 – March 27, 1959

Schlitz Playhouse of Stars is an American anthology television series that was telecast from 1951 until 1959 on CBS. Offering both comedies and drama, the series was sponsored by the Joseph Schlitz Brewing Company. The title was shortened to Schlitz Playhouse beginning with the fall 1957 season.

== Live to film ==
Initially, the show was broadcast live, but starting in the summer of 1953, some episodes were filmed in advance. Beginning with the 1956–1957 season, all of the shows were filmed.

Between October 1951 and March 1952, the hour-long show was aired at 9 p.m. In April 1952, the running time was reduced from an hour to 30 minutes. The series moved to 9:30 p.m. in the 1955 fall season.

== Pilots ==
Three episodes served as pilots for later NBC Western series: The Restless Gun with John Payne (March 29, 1957 pilot) and Tales of Wells Fargo with Dale Robertson (as Jim Hardie; season 6, episode 12 - A Tale of Wells Fargo - aired on December 14, 1956), and the first-run syndication series Shotgun Slade with Scott Brady (season eight, episode 14 aired on March 27, 1959). The Restless Gun pilot was based on the radio series The Six Shooter, and Payne's character had the same name, Britt Ponset, as the radio character; that name was changed to Vint Bonner when the actual series began, possibly to prevent confusion with Bret Maverick in Maverick, which debuted in 1957. The same year, Jacques Tourneur directed one episode, "Outlaw's Boots" (25 min), broadcast in December 1957. For the 1958–1959 season, the series alternated weeks with the Lux Playhouse.

An episode of the series also was the pilot for China Smith.

== Guest stars ==
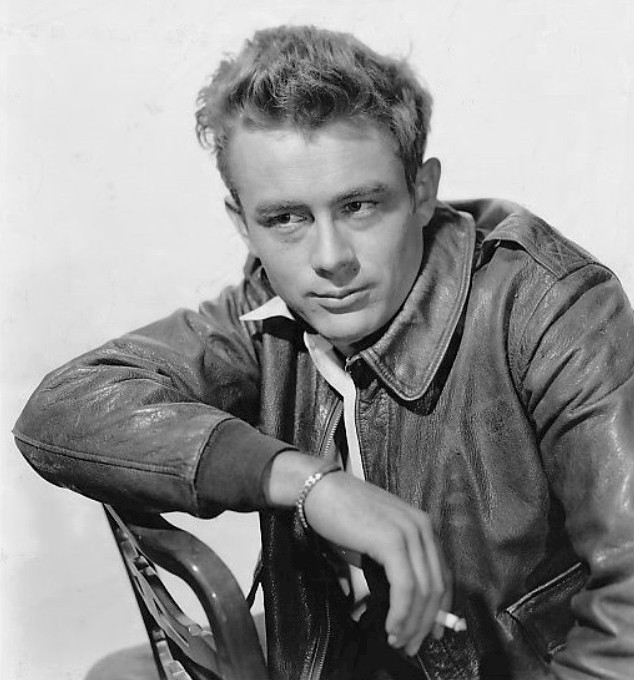
James Dean in "The Unlighted Road" (1955)

Guest stars included the child actress Beverly Washburn, later on The New Loretta Young Show, who appeared in "The Closed Door" (1953) and "One Left Over" (1957).

Child actor Michael Winkelman, later of The Real McCoys, also appeared twice, as Joey Harlow in the 1955 episode "Fast Break" and as Jimmy Quinlin in the 1956 segment "Weapon of Courage."

Phyllis Avery appeared six times, including the episodes "The Girl Who Scared Men Off" and "Bluebeard's Seventh Wife".

Walter Coy appeared four times, including the role of Paul Hunter in "Fool Proof" in 1956.

Rodolfo Hoyos, Jr., played Colonel Louis Coca in the episode "Little War at San Dede" (1954).

Dayton Lummis appeared as editor Cartwright in "The Last Pilot Schooner" and as Arthur Healy in "Ambitious Cop" (both 1955). Tyler MacDuff made his television debut in the 1954 episode "At the Natchez Inn".

Nora Marlowe played Katherine in "The Girl in the Grass" (1957), with fellow guest stars Ray Milland and Carolyn Jones.

James Dean made a rare television appearance in "The Unlighted Road" in 1955.

Gene Kelly made his television dramatic debut in "The Life You Save" in 1957.

Others included Irene Dunne and Helen Hayes in "Not a Chance" (1951, the first episode); John Payne in "The Name is Bellingham" (1951); Rosalind Russell in "Never Wave at a WAC" (1951); Charlton Heston and June Lockhart in "One is a Lonely Number" (1951); Robert Preston and Margaret Sullavan in "The Nymph and the Lamp" (1951); John Payne and Coleen Gray in "Exit" (1951); Anthony Quinn in "Dark Fleece" (1951); Dan Duryea in "P.G." (1952); Vincent Price in "The Human Touch" (1952); Lillian Gish in "The Autobiography of Grandma Moses" (1952); Barbara Britton in "Say Hello to Pamela" (1952); Ann Harding, Lawrence Dobkin and Charles Cane in "Miracle in the Night"; Dolores del Río in "An Old Spanish Custom" (1957), etc. Most had multiple appearances throughout the series.

== Awards ==
In 1958, Paul Monash won a 1957 Emmy Award for Best Teleplay Writing (Half-Hour or Less) for the episode "The Lonely Wizard". In 1954, Billboard ranked the program as sixth-best filmed network dramatic series; it received 264 votes, compared to 826 votes for list-topping Ford Theatre, but well ahead of the series at 10th place, The Revlon Mirror Theater, which only got 35 votes.

== Summer reruns ==
Episodes of the series were rerun during the summer under several titles. In 1957, repeats aired as S.R.O. Playhouse. In 1958, repeats aired for two months as Adorn Playhouse. In 1960 and 1961, the summer reruns aired as Adventure Theater.

== Episodes ==
=== Season 1 (1951-52) ===
No. overall	No. in season	Title	Directed by	Written by	Original release date
1	1	"Not a Chance"	Frank Telford	Story by : Teleplay by : Thomas W. Phipps	October 5, 1951
2	2	"The Name Is Bellingham"	Unknown	Story by : Teleplay by :	October 12, 1951
3	3	"Never Wave at a WAC"	William H. Brown Jr.	Story by : William Dozier; Teleplay by : Don Mankiewicz	October 19, 1951
4	4	"Still Life"	Frank Telford	Story by : Noël Coward; Teleplay by : Robert Anderson	October 26, 1951
5	5	"The Lucky Touch"	Unknown	Story by : Teleplay by :	November 2, 1951
6	6	"Decision and Daniel Webster"	Unknown	Story by : Teleplay by :	November 9, 1951
7	7	"The Memories of Aimee Durant"	Unknown	Story by : Teleplay by :	November 16, 1951
8	8	"One Is a Lonesome Number"	Unknown	Story by : Teleplay by :	November 23, 1951
9	9	"Two Living and One Dead"	Unknown	Story by : Teleplay by :	November 30, 1951
10	10	"The Nymph and the Lamp"	Unknown	Story by : Teleplay by :	December 7, 1951
11	11	"Exit"	Unknown	Story by : Teleplay by :	December 14, 1951
12	12	"Dark Fleece"	Unknown	Story by : Teleplay by :	December 21, 1951
13	13	"Girl in a Million"	Unknown	Story by : Teleplay by :	December 28, 1951
14	14	"Clean Sweep for Lavinia"	Unknown	Story by : Teleplay by :	January 4, 1952
15	15	"Billy Budd"	Unknown	Story by : Herman Melville; Teleplay by : Louis O. Coxe and Robert H. Chapman	January 11, 1952
16	16	"The Man That I Marry"	Unknown	Story by : Teleplay by :	January 18, 1952
17	17	"P.G."	Unknown	Story by : Teleplay by :	January 25, 1952
18	18	"Lady with a Will"	Unknown	Story by : Teleplay by :	February 1, 1952
19	19	"The Daughter"	Unknown	Story by : Teleplay by :	February 8, 1952
20	20	"Fifty Grand"	Unknown	Story by : Teleplay by :	February 15, 1952
21	21	"World So Wide"	Unknown	Story by : Teleplay by :	February 22, 1952
22	22	"Apple of His Eye"	Unknown	Story by : Teleplay by :	February 29, 1952
23	23	"The Haunted Heart"	Unknown	Story by : Teleplay by :	March 7, 1952
24	24	"Make Way For Teddy"	Unknown	Story by : Teleplay by :	March 14, 1952
25	25	"The Human Touch"	Unknown	Story by : Teleplay by :	March 21, 1952
26	26	"The Autobiography of Grandma Moses"	Unknown	Story by : Teleplay by :	March 28, 1952
27	27	"Experiment"	Unknown	Story by : Teleplay by :	April 4, 1952
28	28	"Four's a Family"	Unknown	Story by : Teleplay by :	April 11, 1952
29	29	"Now's the Time"	Unknown	Story by : Teleplay by :	April 18, 1952
30	30	"Fear"	Unknown	Story by : Teleplay by :	April 25, 1952
31	31	"Doctors Should Never Marry"	Unknown	Story by : Teleplay by :	May 2, 1952
32	32	"Appointment with the Past"	Unknown	Story by : Teleplay by :	May 9, 1952
33	33	"Autumn in New York"	William H. Brown Jr.	Story by : Teleplay by : Arnold Schulman	May 16, 1952
Jazz-tinged musical comedy sketch feat. Polly Bergen, with songs by Vernon Duke (title tune plus April in Paris, I Can't Get Started and Now); musical director Glen Osser
34	34	"Love Came Late"	Unknown	Story by : Teleplay by :	May 23, 1952
35	35	"A Quarter for Your Troubles"	Unknown	Story by : Teleplay by :	May 30, 1952
36	36	"Souvenir from Singapore"	Unknown	Story by : Teleplay by :	June 6, 1952
37	37	"Dress in the Window"	Unknown	Story by : Teleplay by :	June 13, 1952
38	38	"Say Hello to Pamela"	Unknown	Story by : Teleplay by :	June 20, 1952
39	39	"The Von Linden File"	Unknown	Story by : Teleplay by :	June 27, 1952
40	40	"The House of Death"	Unknown	Story by : Teleplay by :	July 4, 1952
41	41	"A Southern Lady"	Unknown	Story by : Teleplay by :	July 11, 1952
42	42	"Early Space Conquerors"	Unknown	Story by : Teleplay by :	July 18, 1952
43	43	"A Man's World"	Unknown	Story by : Teleplay by :	July 25, 1952
44	44	"Crossroads"	Unknown	Story by : Teleplay by :	August 1, 1952
45	45	"So Help Me"	Unknown	Story by : Teleplay by :	August 8, 1952
46	46	"Double Exposure"	Unknown	Story by : Teleplay by :	August 15, 1952
47	47	"Mr. And Mrs. Trubble or The Tubbles"	Unknown	Story by : Teleplay by :	August 22, 1952
48	48	"Port of Call"	Unknown	Story by : Teleplay by :	August 29, 1952

=== Season 2 (1952-53) ===
- May 1, 1953 - "Medicine Man" - George Brent, Andrea King

=== Season 3 (1953-54) ===
- March 5, 1954 - "The Great Lady" - Ann Harding, Vera Miles, Glenn Roberts, Douglas Kennedy

=== Season 4 (1954-55) ===
- January 14, 1955 - "Man Out of the Rain" - Phyllis Thaxter, Allene Roberts, Skip Homeier, Ray Walker, James Westerfield

=== Season 5 (1955-56) ===
- January 20, 1956 - "The Big Payday" - James Whitmore, Richard Crane, Janet DeGore
- January 27, 1956 - "The Day I Died" - David Brian

Other data not available

=== Season 6 (1956-57) ===
Data not available

=== Season 7 (1957-58) ===
Data not available

=== Season 8 (1958-59) ===
No. overall	No. in season	Title	Directed by	Written by	Original release date
TBA	1	"Portrait of a Legend"	Don Weis	Story by : Milo Wood; Teleplay by : Donald S. Sanford	September 12, 1958
TBA	2	"Kinsman"	Jules Bricken	Story by : Teleplay by : Tom Seller	September 19, 1958
TBA	3	"A Thing To Fight For"	John Brahm	Story by : Wyatt Blassingame; Teleplay by : Paul Monash	September 26, 1958
TBA	4	"The Hasty Hanging"	John Brahm	Story by : Teleplay by : Charles Larson	October 10, 1958
TBA	5	"The Trouble With Ruth"	John Brahm	Story by : Henry Slesar; Teleplay by : Jameson Brewer	October 24, 1958
TBA	6	"False Impression"	Don Medford	Story by : Teleplay by : Jameson Brewer	November 7, 1958
TBA	7	"The Last Edition"	John Brahm	Story by : Teleplay by : Helen Cooper & Irving H. Cooper	November 21, 1958
TBA	8	"Third Son"	Unknown	Story by : Ernest Haycox; Teleplay by : Tom Seller	December 5, 1958
TBA	9	"No Answer"	Arthur Hiller	Story by : Theodore Sturgeon; Teleplay by : Tom Seller	December 19, 1958
TBA	10	"A Fistful Of Love"	Allen H. Miner	Story by : Teleplay by : Allen H. Miner	January 2, 1959
TBA	11	"You Can’t Win'em All"	David Butler	Story by : Mac Shoub; Teleplay by : Charles Larson	January 16, 1959
TBA	12	"And Practically Strangers"	Jules Bricken	Story by : Robert Bristow; Teleplay by : Halsey Melone	January 30, 1959
TBA	13	"The Man Who Had No Friends"	Anton M. Leader	Story by : Hugh Pentecost; Teleplay by : Tom Seller	February 13, 1959
TBA	14	"On The Brink"	Sidney Lanfield	Story by : James Yaffe; Teleplay by : Kathleen Hite	February 27, 1959
TBA	15	"Ivy League"	Richard Whorf	Story by : Jameson Brewer; Teleplay by : Everett Freeman	March 13, 1959
TBA	16	"The Salted Mine"	James Nielson	Story by : Teleplay by : Frank Gruber	March 27, 1959
TBA	17	"The Rumor"	Richard Haydn	Story by : Erskine Caldwell; Teleplay by : Everett Greenbaum and Fritzell Greenbaum	June 5, 1959
TBA	18	"Hostage"	John Brahm	Story by : Teleplay by : Tom Seller	June 19, 1959
TBA	19	"Cowboy Five Seven"	James Stewart	Story by : Teleplay by : Beirne Lay Jr.	July 17, 1959
TBA	20	"A Ballad to Die By"	Robert M. Leeds	Story by : Roy Chanslor; Teleplay by : Otis Carney	July 31, 1959

== Production ==
In April 1957 Schlitz extended its contract with Revue Productions, agreeing to pay approximately $2 million for 40 episodes. The increased budget enabled Revue to seek top-name stars for the series. Jules Bricken and Frank P. Rosenberg were the producers.

== Sale ==
CBS-TV bought the negative rights to 104 episodes of Schlitz Playhouse of Stars for about $1.2 million in 1957 with RKO Teleradio serving as an intermediary between the network and Meridian Productions. CBS tried to buy the property outright, but Meridian wanted payments spread over 10 years, and the network did not want a long-term commitment. RKO Teleradio solved the problem by accepting the short-term payment from CBS and, in turn, paying 10 percent to Meridian each year for a decade.
