= Norris Houghton =

American co-founder of off-Broadway theatre (1909–2001)

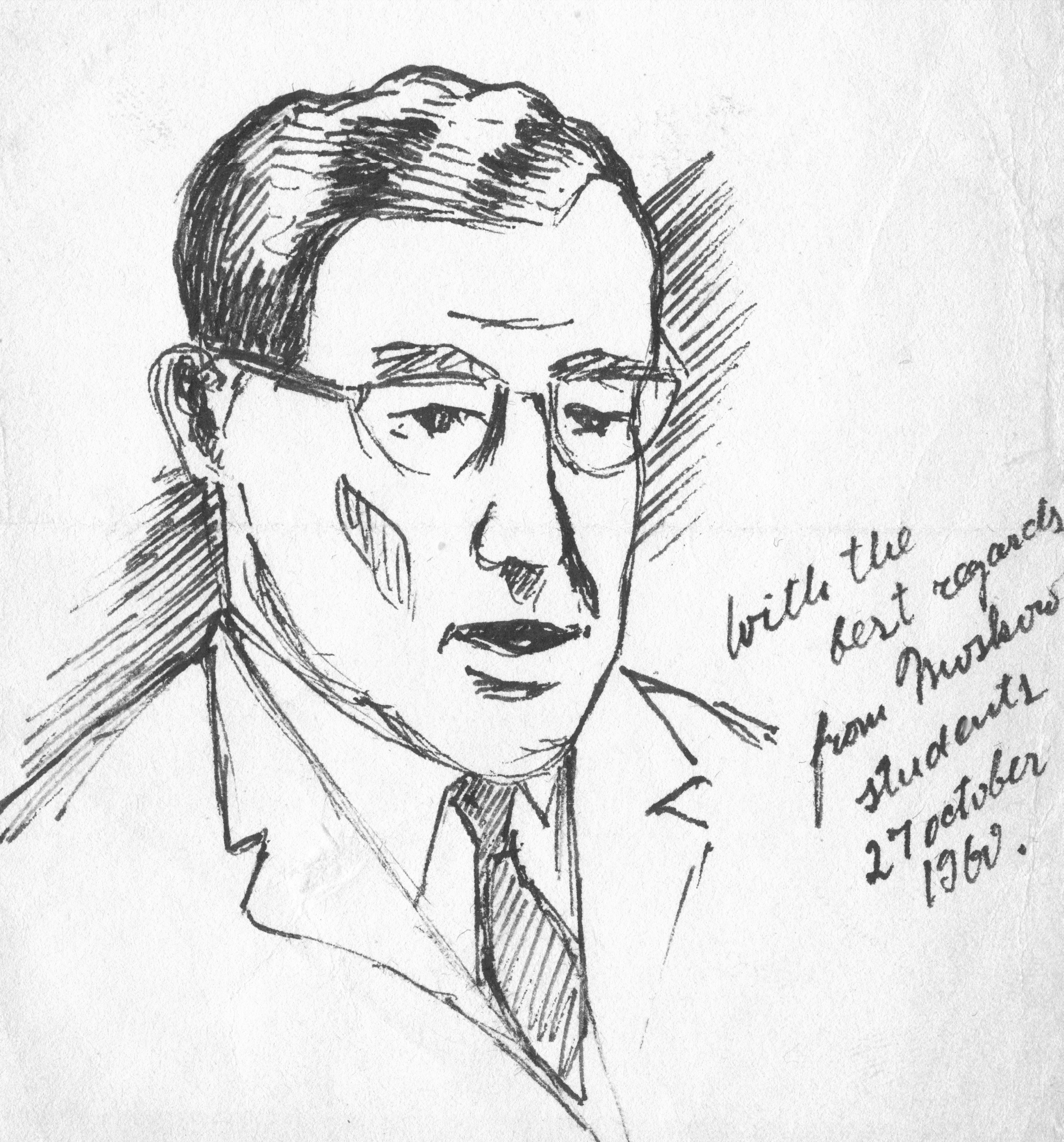
Sketch of Norris Houghton from Moscow students, 27 October 1960

Charles Norris Houghton (26 December 1909 – 9 October 2001) was an American stage manager, scenic designer, producer, director, theatre manager, academic, author, and public policy advocate. Houghton is known as an American expert in 20th-century Russian Theatre; as a major force in creating the "off-Broadway" movement; as a student and educator of global theater; and as an influential advocate of arts education.

Houghton taught at Princeton, Columbia, and Vassar; his academic career continued at the State University of New York, where he helped create the SUNY Purchase campus and served as founding Dean of Theatre and Film. He wrote many books and articles. His books and papers are preserved for study in several university and college libraries and archives.

== Early life and introduction to the theatre ==
Charles Norris Houghton was born in Indianapolis, Indiana, the youngest of three children of Grace Norris and Charles Houghton of Oxford, Ohio. After his parents separated in 1921 he was raised by his devoted, quiet, intellectual mother and her sister, Sarah. He remained close to them throughout their lives and their many influences included a lifetime of resilient Christian faith.

Houghton discovered the stage at age seven, when he was taken by his maternal grandfather to see E.H. Sothern and Julia Marlowe in The Taming of the Shrew, and the following year to a musical brought from London, Chu Chin Chow. Live theater ("the road") was a predominant form of entertainment, but this introduction was more than a shared cultural experience: in theater he discovered his life's plan. By age 14, Houghton offered festivals of short plays in the family home, recruiting and training the Stringscraft Players of nine young marionetteers. This period revealed the role he would pursue throughout his long life: "finding (or writing) the play, peopling it with performers, both the marionettes themselves and the manipulators of their strings; the former must be costumed, the stage decorated and lighted...and the whole put together by an impresario (myself)." By age 16 at the New Gothic style sanctuary of Tabernacle Presbyterian Church he created two Christmas pageant tableaux extravaganzas for 150 performers, including coaching the choir and an organist in unfamiliar excerpts of Monteverdi and Pergolesi.

With a record that included captain of the debate team and senior class president, Houghton was admitted to Princeton, chosen over Harvard because of Princeton's Triangle Club, the oldest collegiate musical-comedy group in the nation. That choice gave him an early introduction to New York City theatre, an easy commute from Princeton. Many Triangle Club members became lifelong friends who helped shape modern theatre. He flourished as stage and costume designer as well as the Triangle's vice-president in this company that included Joshua Logan, Jose Ferrer, James Stewart, Erik Barnouw, Myron McCormick, Alfred Dalrymple, Bretaigne Windust, and Lemuel Ayers. As an undergraduate he balanced the student-run dramatic arts organization with studies in humanistic educational traditions, including highest honors thesis research in 17th Century English Masque productions.

== The University Players Guild ==
At graduation from Princeton in 1931, Houghton had two choices: a fellowship at Princeton Graduate College to pursue English Literature or an invitation to join the University Players Guild. The U.P.G.—started as summer theatre in Cape Cod, aspiring to become a year-round venture—was founded in 1928 by Bretaigne Windust and Charles Leatherbee with involvement of Josh Logan. Houghton chose the U.P.G., which melded his interests in theatrical productions with gifted artists. As with associations during his undergraduate years, he would know his U.P.G. friends as colleagues and notables who would dominate stage and screen for decades. In Houghton's first year with the U.P.G. (the group's fourth summer season) Leatherbee, Logan and Windust espoused "the idea of theatre artists working together over a long period of time subordinating themselves to the whole and finding therein a satisfaction beyond that accruing from individual glory." Performances emerged without long rehearsals; actors learned roles in several days; sets were designed with the sketchiest of preliminary layouts. Each summer provided adventures and emotional upheavals, chronicled in Houghton's account of the U.P.G. Players, But Not Forgotten. This concept of a collective ensemble would persist throughout Houghton's career. More than a concern for long term stability, it reflected his concept of advancing beyond tradition to open channels for new forms of creativity. While the U.P.G. did not succeed as a long term venture, Houghton recalled "we had the memory of a dream that was not yet really proved vain. It had been a glorious prelude to a life in the theatre."

Throughout this period, ranging from full to empty houses, Houghton never regretted rejecting the offer of assistant stage manager job for Mourning Becomes Electra with New York City's Theatre Guild, the nation's ace theatrical production company. Such coveted opportunities reflected both on Houghton's rapidly growing reputation and the evolution of his unique life plan; similar conflicts in decision making would recur throughout his life. History shows that he was guided by Leatherbee's advice to avoid alliance with the dated, no matter how distinguished. Houghton would persist in becoming a contributor to the future rather than remaining in the safety of the past.

== New York to Moscow ==
Houghton was both an advocate of global theater and dedicated to the live theater of New York City. He moved there to await his chance, livened by his Princeton companions and the U.P.G. weekly beer parties on West 47th Street that brought together the older "alumni" and new young aspirants such as Burgess Meredith, Broderick Crawford, John Beal and Karl Malden. His first break came with an appointment as assistant to Robert Edmond Jones, an acclaimed designer who moved stage design into an integral part of stage productions; scenic design and artistic direction was a lifelong passion of Houghton's. Varied opportunities followed but none included a permanent position, so Houghton accepted a Guggenheim Fellowship for a year of study abroad. Following the suggestion of Henry Allen Moe, Guggenheim Director General, the fellowship transformed Houghton's career: it introduced him to the renowned but little understood Russian theatre, and led to a future that included expository writing appealing to both academic experts and a public audience. The experience and his writings led to his reputation as the preeminent American student and teacher of the Russian theater, illumined by his relationship with the major 20th-century Russian theater figure, Stanislavski. This year of study also ripened to a global perspective that remained a constant throughout his life.

== Moscow rehearsals: the definitive work on Russian theatre ==
Gaining admission at audience level to the famed Russian theatre, Houghton experienced art as a revered and honored cultural mission in contrast to the glitter of New York theatre. Welcomed by giants of Russian theatre: Konstantin Stanislavski, distinguished actress Olga Leonardovna Knipper-Chekhova (Anton Chekhov's widow), Alexander Tairov, and the revolutionary director Vsevolod Meierhold, Houghton was accepted at rehearsals at Stanislavski's world-famous Moscow Art Theatre—an essential for any informed scholarship about Russian theatre. Houghton noted that observing Stanislavski gave him "an understanding of the difference between Soviet and American attitude toward the arts"—a distinction not complimentary to the American perspective. Houghton's career coincided with the emergence of the postmodern era in the arts, and he was a keen observer of its effect in the theater and a reporter whose writing clarified complex concepts for his readers. Observing Russia's Realistic Theater, with its goal of comingling audience and actor, Houghton noted "...spectators and actors look much the same... there will be Red Army uniforms on the stage and in the house; there will be shawl-shrouded women and rough-bloused men in both places." These experiences enabled Norris Houghton to become the preeminent American authority on Russian theatre and challenged him to look beyond fashionable modes, to understand art through experiential training, and to infuse those values in his productions. Konstantin Stanislavsky presented his book, My Life In Art, to Houghton with the inscription: "To Charles Norris Houghton, my dear comrade in art, with this friendly advice: love the art in yourself and not yourself in art."

In 1935, the first draft of Moscow Rehearsals complete, Houghton returned to New York City. Stage manager of a production of Libel! directed by Otto Preminger in his first American appearance, the play was still running when reviews of Houghton's book on the Russian theatre hit the presses. They were so extraordinary that Houghton said "I was taken aback." Renowned critic John Mason Brown, writing in The New York Times, said that Mr. Houghton's book "ought to be devoured by every director, manager, actor and critic in our theater." The book's success increased led to requests that Houghton travel and report on regional, national, and international theater. He gained better understanding of the diversity of theater outside of New York.

== Challenges and legacies from Broadway and beyond ==
In those pre-WWII years, Houghton was engaged as stage manager on various productions, working with former U.P.G. friends, Kent Smith, Jose Ferrer, Myron McCormick, and some established stars such as Ethel Barrymore, Ruth Gordon, Claude Rains. In 1939 he became art director of the St. Louis Municipal Opera. The "Muny," as its devoted audience call it, then held summer performances on an enormous stage in Forest Park before 11,000 people seated on an open hillside. Houghton's success in meeting the challenge of designing scenes for an outdoor stage that included two gigantic oak trees led to three seasons of invitations as art director.

In 1940, he was approached by Harcourt Brace to write a book on American theatre beyond Broadway. Funded by the Rockefeller Foundation, Houghton criss-crossed the US, visiting 70 stages. Children's theatre, college campus theatre, outdoor history pageants, union workers' theatre, summer stock, middle-American "nightclub" variety theatres, the "road" sites for touring Broadway hits, community theatres often more social than artistic: this montage was critiqued, applauded, reprimanded, and encouraged as evidence of theatrical aspirations more democratic than the commercial Broadway model. Enthused by these experiences, they heightened Houghton's disappointment about the dearth of original plays by young Americans, and the failure of recognized American playwrights to ally themselves with regional theatres. In the resulting book, Advance From Broadway, Houghton asserted "...my declaration of independence from the commercial theatre and a call for decentralization of our professional stage." Houghton resonated to the parting advice of a "living legend" among theatre aficionados, Edward Sheldon, who had advised him: "Seek out the people who put these things in motion. They're what matter." Many fine men and women were out there in America. "It's they I must remember."

Houghton's call for theatrical renaissance and independence from Broadway strictures was overwhelmed temporarily by World War II. The war became a memorable interlude in Houghton's life, after recruitment into a service that would utilize his skills in the Russian language. In early 1945 he became part of the support staff for the Big Three conference in Yalta, a meeting that shaped post-war Europe. He later chronicled his experiences in The New Yorker as "That Was Yalta: Worm's Eye View." His war experiences led into encounters that reflected the charisma of this man, including a meeting with Michael Redgrave in a piano bar in London where Lt. Houghton (j.g.) USNR had been posted as part of a naval communications unit. That encounter blossomed into a lifelong friendship with the Redgraves and a production of Macbeth starring Michael, directed by Houghton, in London and New York in 1947 and 1948.

The decade following World War II marked a period of change in American theatre. He enjoyed a key role in this period, including the associate editorship of a primary resource in the theatrical world, Theatre Arts. In 1945 he became director, producer, and pioneer of what would become known as Off-Broadway. In two triumphal seasons, the Theatre Inc group he helped found presented Gertrude Lawrence in Pygmalion, London's Old Vic in repertory of four classics featuring, among others, Laurence Olivier, Ralph Richardson, and Margaret Leighton; The Playboy of the Western World with Burgess Meredith, and the "primitive and violent" Macbeth on which Redgrave and Houghton had collaborated originally in London. Brooks Atkinson reviewed Macbeth: "Under Norris Houghton's direction, Macbeth gives us, for the first time in my memory, the sweep and excitement of the drama as a whole." He called it "a unified work of the theatre."

== A major motivation: the rejection of Billy Budd ==
These experiences crystallized into action by a series of events following Houghton's receipt of a manuscript dramatizing Herman Melville's Billy Budd, Foretopman co-authored by his fellow Princeton alumnus Robert Chapman. Successfully finding backing for a production of Louis O. Coxe and Chapman's Billy Budd, with restaging by Josh Logan, the show opened on Broadway on February 10, 1951. Despite laudatory reviews by Brooks Atkinson and the attempt of others to prolong the run, the play closed after three months. Houghton learned that the Pulitzer Prize panel had selected this drama for its annual award, but nothing came of it. This frustrating episode led Houghton to look for theater not subject to Broadway's hit/flop syndrome.

Television was not a viable alternative. In his brief engagement as producer/director of the CBS Television Workshop, Houghton directed 14 programs. The series ended when CBS failed to find a show sponsor and Houghton found the TV environment "decivilizing," not allowing time for any of the cultural activities that enriched the life he might bring to his productions.

== The phoenix rises ==
Houghton's commitment to an off-Broadway theater coincided with a confluence of experimental theatres in the 1950s, including the Living Theatre of Julian Beck and Judith Malina, focused on poetic dramas and the Circle in the Square organized by Jose Quintero and Theodore Mann that showcased young talent in revivals of plays not commercially successful on Broadway. In 1953 Houghton and an acquaintance, T. Edward Hambleton, agreed to establish a new theater based on a mutual "off-Broadway" dream. They agreed on principles that emerged from Houghton's two decades of experiences: their theatre would be separate from Times Square; it would be a "permanent" company; they would produce four to five plays for limited engagements; in contrast to the star system, actors would be listed alphabetically; the ticket price would be half of Broadway's top, with tickets available also for one dollar; the management structure would be a traditional limited partnership, but contributors would be asked to fund an entire season rather than each production. They named it the Phoenix, and it operated from 1953 to 1982, managed in its later years by Hambleton as Houghton moved into academia. The Phoenix experiment became a pioneer in the off-Broadway movement; its origins and history are perhaps the accomplishments for which Houghton is best known.

They compromised on a deserted movie house on East 12th Street. Located far from Broadway, larger than they wanted, its design was adequate, if not ideal, for their productions. The Phoenix opened December 1, 1953: the first production was Madam Will You Walk?, the posthumous performance of a new play by deceased Pulitzer Prize winner Sidney Howard, starring Hume Cronyn and Jessica Tandy. A midnight review on CBS cited "an exciting and new theatrical adventure born tonight amidst laughter and hearty applause of 1200 enthusiastic people who stirred away from their TV sets to see a very witty and provocative play by Sidney Howard. The evening was exciting in another way, however, because it saw a theatre which had been dark brought to light—brought to life again...When the lights are on at the Phoenix—and you are the only ones who can keep them on—there's theatre magic in abundance to be heard and seen and enjoyed."

Good reviews alone could not keep the lights on because opening night was the eve of a Manhattan newspaper strike. Curtain speeches appealing to audiences to spread the news in New York City yielded a sold-out Saturday night. The next production was Coriolanus, starring Robert Ryan and Mildred Natwick, directed by John Houseman. Then came the challenge of an off-beat musical take on the Trojan War, The Golden Apple, written by John LaTouche, music by Jerome Moross. Brooks Atkinson called it "a light, gay, charming production...the only literate new musical of the season..." Mixed reviews recurred throughout Phoenix' life, but the New York Drama Critics' Circle named The Golden Apple the Best New Musical of the 1953/54 season, and it received the cover and inside-spread photo coverage of Life Magazine and was transferred to Broadway by Roger L. Stevens and Alfred de Liagre.

To conclude the Phoenix opening season, Houghton approached Montgomery Clift, an acquaintance since Houghton designed the set for Clift's 1939 Broadway debut in the Theatre Guild's Dame Nature. The outcome was The Seagull with Clift as Constantin and Houghton as director. Other major roles were taken by Maureen Stapleton, June Walker, George Voskovec, Sam Jaffe, Will Geer, John Fiedler and Judith Evelyn. As rehearsals moved forward, the attempt to hurry a complex Chekhovian play into production and Clift's offstage instability took its toll. It received mixed reviews.

The Phoenix opening season was judged a resounding success and led to many subsequent award-winning productions. These attracted the talent of numerous theatre artists, including: British actors Pamela Brown, Michael Redgrave, Rachel Kempson, and Peggy Ashcroft; directors and producers Elia Kazan, John Houseman, and Robert Whitehead; writers and designers Robert Sherwood, John Latouche, Jerome Moross, Donald Oenslager, and William and Jean Eckart; American actors Hume Cronyn, Jessica Tandy, Mildred Dunnock, Robert Ryan, Montgomery Clift, and Kaye Ballard; professional colleagues and friends, Howard Lindsay, Russel Crouse, Jo Mielziner, Oscar Hammerstein II, Peggy Wood, William Inge, and Arthur Miller. Examples of the span of productions include: The Doctor's Dilemma (George Bernard Shaw), The Master Builder (Henrik Ibsen), Story of a Soldier (music drama, Igor Stravinsky), Six Characters in Search of an Author (Luigi Pirandello), The Mother of Us All (opera, Virgil Thomson and Gertrude Stein), Measure for Measure (William Shakespeare), The Good Woman of Szechuan (Bertolt Brecht), Taming of the Shrew (William Shakespeare), and Anna Christie (Eugene O'Neill).

Balancing these successes were two major impediments to Houghton's long-term alliance to the Phoenix: their model resulted in a frenetic pace to their productions and they had persistent financial problems. Houghton recognized that they did not have a stable organizational structure or method to present theatre under a business plan that required appreciation by both establishment critiques and audiences. Most unsettling was the opinion that the Phoenix had not developed an appropriately unique viewpoint recognizable by respected critics. Houghton recognized other personal problems: he had become frustrated that the role of theatrical producer did not include his talents as designer and director.

Houghton considered as a solution to this dilemma an academic life that would allow him to couple academia with the role of theatre partner to T. Edward Hambleton, who would remain with the Phoenix until it closed. Initially, Houghton's movement into what would eventually become his full-time work as an academic was a mixture of teaching, writing, travel, and theater management. Houghton accepted a position as adjunct drama professor for the academic year 1959/1960 at Vassar College. In 1961 he returned to the Phoenix as co-managing director and helped achieve the goal to move into more appropriate space. The new home was a 300-seat house on East 74th Street, relieving them of the technical and financial issues related to the previous over-sized space. Their first production there was the spoof on Theatre of the Absurd written by Arthur Kopit, Oh Dad, Poor Dad, Mamma's Hung You in the Closet and I'm Feelin' So Sad, staged with wit and style by Jerome Robbins in his debut (and finale) as director of a straight play. (1,2,3,33,34,35)

Houghton then accepted a full-time position as professor, department chair and director of the Vassar Experimental Theatre, attempting a compromise of living in the Hudson valley while continuing to work in New York City. After three years, Houghton committed to a full-time academic life and Hambleton continued the Phoenix for another twenty years.

== Academia: transmitting theatre to a new generation ==
Houghton's academic career followed a non-traditional pattern for a number of years. Beginning in the 1950s, he was offered coveted positions in a number of prestigious colleges and university, for years he moved in and out of these positions, combining them with an active life in the theater and as an analyst, interpreter, and author of global theater. In 1960, he returned to Russia on a second Guggenheim Fellowship that led to Return Engagement, the postscript to Moscow Rehearsals. In 1965, he went to Germany at the invitation of the West German government to tour its theatrical centers. Shortly after returning he received an invitation to visit Korea, funded by the Rockefeller Foundation, to guide a theatre project in Seoul. From Korea he was welcomed to visits in Japan, Thailand, Cambodia, and Kathmandu, augmenting his understanding of theatre.

Houghton taught at Columbia, Princeton, Smith College, Union Theological Seminary, Yale, Barnard Vassar College, New York University, Harvard, University of Louisville, Lynchburg College, Shanghai Drama Academy, and SUNY Purchase. At an earlier stage he taught theatre history from 1936 to 1939 at the Finch School in New York City, a small prestigious high school for girls. After his World War II service ended, he rejoined Princeton to participate full-time in the Creative Arts Program while completing his book Advance From Broadway.

At Vassar College, from 1962 to 1967, he was full professor and chair of the drama department. From there he went to join the State University of New York's newly envisioned college at Purchase, New York.

Houghton's books, personal papers, playscripts, and other writings are held in collections at the Century Club in New York City and in university libraries and rare book collections, including Vassar, Princeton, Columbia, and Ohio State.

== Advocacy for arts education as national policy ==
In 1973, concurrently with his deanship at Purchase, Houghton became president of the American Council for the Arts in Education. Houghton proposed a public panel report from distinguished objective citizens, rather than established arts educators, about arts education as a national priority. David Rockefeller Jr., chair of what became the Arts, Education and Americans Panel, was recruited by vice-chair Houghton. That made fundraising and attraction of a high level panel easier. The short term effects of this effort are seen in the 1977 panel report, Coming To Our Senses: The Significance of the Arts for American Education, and numerous national programs supporting the arts in educational settings.

== Finale ==
After retirement, Houghton lived an active life with such stints as Visiting Distinguished Professor at the University of Louisville reflecting the long term devotion of Barry Bingham, head of the Louisville Courier-Journal newspaper dynasty, and writing his memoir, Entrances and Exits: A Life In and Out of the Theatre. John Russell described it in the New York Times: "By his own account Norris Houghton is the most contented of men, and rightly so. When he was 11 years old, all of 70 years ago, he decided his role in life would be to put on good plays and get people to come and see them. He did it at home, he did it in school and he did it at Princeton University, where as an undergraduate he fell in with more than one future luminary of the American theater. He did it everywhere and all the time. It did not... win him either fame or fortune, but some great adventures resulted. And if today there is first-rate theater in New York that is not on Broadway, and if there are towns all over the United States that pride themselves on their local theaters, something may be owed to the example of Norris Houghton."

He died in 2001 and was celebrated by a full-choir funeral ritual at First Presbyterian Church in the City of New York, where as long-time member and Elder he had coaxed the historic Manhattan congregation into sponsoring a Phoenix series of plays by Nobel prizewinners including dramas with religious themes.

Norris Houghton wrote articles for: American Scholar; Arts in Society; Atlantic Monthly; Educational Theatre Journal, Harper's Bazaar, The New Yorker, New Theatre Magazine, The Russian Review, The New York Times; The Drama Review; The Saturday Review; Stage; Theatre; Theatre Arts.

=== Awards/Honorary Memberships ===
- Guggenheim Fellowships, 1934–1935; 1960–1961
- Rockefeller Foundation Grant-in-Aid, 1940–1941
- Excellence in Theater Award, 1958 New England Theater Conference
- Advisory Council, Institute for Advanced Studies in Theatre Arts, 1959
- Honorary Doctorate of Fine Arts, Denison University, 1959
- Obie Award 1961–1962 for best set to Norris Houghton, Who'll Save the Plowboy?
- Rockefeller Brothers Fund Panel on Performing Arts 1962–1964
- Fellow, Salzburg Seminar for American Studies, 1972
- President, National Theatre Conference, 1969–1971
- President, American Council for the Arts in Education, 1973–1975
- Drama Desk Award Outstanding Revival, 1976
- Vice Chairman, Arts, Education and Americans Panel and A.E.A. Inc, 1977–1980
- Fellow, American Academy of Arts and Sciences, 1962–1992
- Fellow, American Theatre Association, 1980–1992
- National Theater Conference Award, 1991
