= List of Guggenheim Fellowships awarded in 1935 =

List of Guggenheim Fellowships awarded in 1935. Forty-seven artists and scholars received fellowships.

== 1935 U.S. and Canadian Fellows ==
Category	Field of Study	Fellow	Institutional association	Research topic	Notes	Ref
Creative Arts	Choreography	Angna Enters		Ancient Greek art forms	Also won in 1934	
Creative Arts	Fiction	Alvah Cecil Bessie		Writing		
Creative Arts	Fiction	Jack Conroy		Migratory workers in northern industrial factory cities		
Creative Arts	Fiction	Langston Hughes		Writing		
Creative Arts	Fine Arts	Mitchell Fields		Sculpture	Also won in 1932	
Creative Arts	Fine Arts	Vincent Glinsky		Sculpture		
Creative Arts	Fine Arts	Yasuo Kuniyoshi		Painting; research in the Southwest and Mexico		
Creative Arts	Fine Arts	Rico Lebrun		Mural project	Also won in 1937, 1962	
Creative Arts	Fine Arts	Henry Ellis Mattson		Painting		
Creative Arts	Fine Arts	Frank Mechau		Painting	Also won in 1934, 1938	
Creative Arts	Fine Arts	Carlotta Petrina		Painting	Also won in 1933	
Creative Arts	Fine Arts	Carl Walters		Sculpture	Also won in 1936	
Creative Arts	Music Composition	Dante Fiorillo		Composition	Also won in 1936, 1937, 1938	
Creative Arts	Music Composition	Paul Nordoff		Composition	Also won in 1933	
Creative Arts	Music Composition	Walter Hamor Piston	Harvard University	Composition		
Creative Arts	Music Composition	William Grant Still		Composition	Also won in 1934, 1938	
Creative Arts	Poetry	Lola Ridge		Writing		
Creative Arts	Theatre Arts	Mordecai Gorelik		Influence of scientific and industrial technique on methods of scene design and staging		
Creative Arts	Theatre Arts	Norris Houghton		Methods of theatrical production in Soviet Russia	Also won in 1934, 1960	
Creative Arts	Theatre Arts	Cleon Throckmorton		Historical theaters in Europe		
Humanities	American Literature	Newton Arvin	Smith College	Walt Whitman and his relation to the political, cultural and intellectual history of the United States during his lifetime		
Humanities	American Literature	George Tremaine McDowell	University of Minnesota	William Cullen Bryant in Massachusetts		
Humanities	American Literature	Stanley Thomas Williams	Yale University	Nathaniel Hawthorne		
Humanities	Biography	Howard Mumford Jones	University of Michigan	Thomas Moore	Also won in 1932, 1964	
Humanities	Classics	Henry Roy William Smith	University of California	Greek vase paintings		
Humanities	English Literature	Ruth Hughey	Henderson College	Editing a newly discovered manuscript anthology of 16th-century poetry		
Humanities	Fine Arts Research	Suzanne La Follette		Effect of economic conditions upon art during the various historical periods		
Humanities	Folklore and Popular Culture	Harvey Fergusson		Southwestern folklore and history		
Humanities	General Nonfiction	Kenneth Burke				
Humanities	General Nonfiction	Calvin Hooker Goddard		Science of tracing discharged bullets to the weapons that fired them		
Humanities	German and East European History	Chester Wells Clark	Princeton University	Bismarck's technique in manipulating public opinion and an investigation of unpublished sources bearing on his diplomacy before 1871		
Humanities	Intellectual and Cultural History	Arthur Edward Christy	Columbia University	Consequences primarily to Western Europe of the process by which the world has become Europeanized		
Humanities	Literary Criticism	Edmund Wilson		To the Finland Station: An essay on the writing and acting of history	Also won in 1939	
Humanities	Near Eastern Studies	Robert Harbold McDowell	University of Michigan	Ancient coin collections in Persia		
Humanities	Philosophy	Cooper Harold Langford	University of Michigan	Critical examination of recent formalism in logic; theory of propositions		
Natural Sciences	Mathematics	Arthur Herbert Copeland, Sr.	University of Michigan	Development of a complete set of postulates for the foundation of the theory of probability and proof of their consistency		
Natural Sciences	Mathematics	David Vernon Widder	Harvard University	Application of the general theory of function space to the theory of Laplace integrals		
Natural Sciences	Molecular and Cellular Biology	Werner Emmanuel Bachmann	University of Michigan	Sterols and bile acids		
Natural Sciences	Molecular and Cellular Biology	William Clouser Boyd	Evans Center for Interdisciplinary Biomedical Research	Comparative study of blood types of living and ancient Egyptians	Also won in 1937, 1961	
Natural Sciences	Molecular and Cellular Biology	Morris Moore	Barnard Free Skin and Cancer Hospital	Comparative study of the life-cycles of certain disease-producing fungi of North and South America	Also won in 1936	
Natural Sciences	Physics	Samuel King Allison	University of Chicago	Symbolic logic		
Natural Sciences	Physics	William Houlder Zachariasen	University of Chicago	Symbolic logic		
Natural Sciences	Plant Sciences	Thomas H. Goodspeed	University of California	Collection of specimen plants in the highland regions of South America	Also won in 1930, 1956	
Social Sciences	Anthropology and Cultural Studies	Charles Lewis Camp	University of California	Comparative vertebrate paleontology of the triassic age		
Social Sciences	Anthropology and Cultural Studies	George Herzog	Yale University	Music in primitive cultures	Also won in 1947	
Social Sciences	Economics	Abram Lincoln Harris	Howard University	Comparative analysis of the economic systems of Karl Marx and Thorstein Veblen	Also won in 1936, 1943, 1953	
Social Sciences	Psychology	Otto Klineberg	Columbia University, Sarah Lawrence College	Emotional expression of the Chinese		

== 1935 Latin American and Caribbean Fellows ==
Category	Field of Study	Fellow	Institutional association	Research topic	Notes	Ref
Natural Sciences	Earth Science	Pedro J. Bermúdez Hernández	University of Havana	Foraminifera in the Caribbean	Also won in 1936	
Natural Sciences	Medicine and Health	Atilio Macchiavello Varas	Sanitary Inspection Service of the Northern Sanitary Zone of Chile		Also won in 1934	
Natural Sciences	Medicine and Health	Teófilo Ortiz Ramírez		Cardiac physiology		
Natural Sciences	Medicine and Health	Enrique Savino		Public health with an emphasis on epidemiology	Also won in 1936, 1937	
Natural Sciences	Organismic Biology and Ecology	Luis Hugo Howell Rivero		West Indian fishes	Also won in 1934	
Natural Sciences	Physics	Alfredo Baños, Jr.	Universidad Nacional Autónoma de México	Physical nature of dielectric constant and of the conductivity of dielectrics	Also won in 1936, 1937, 1957	

== See also ==
- Guggenheim Fellowship
- List of Guggenheim Fellowships awarded in 1934
- List of Guggenheim Fellowships awarded in 1936
