= CBS Television Workshop =

1952 American anthology series

- Genre: Anthology
- Directed by: Curt Conway; Richard Franchot; Sidney Lumet
- Country of origin: United States
- Original language: English
- No. of seasons: 1
- No. of episodes: 14

Production
- Producers: Norris Houghton; Joe Scully
- Camera setup: Single-camera
- Running time: 25 mins.
- Production company: CBS Productions

Original release
- Network: CBS
- Release: January 13 – April 13, 1952

CBS Television Workshop is an American anthology series that aired on CBS from January 13, 1952, to April 13, 1952. The series is noted for featuring early television appearances of several well known actors, including Audrey Hepburn, James Dean, Sidney Poitier and Grace Kelly. The title was also used for a 1960 series.

== 1952 series ==
Writers whose works were adapted for the series included Ray Bradbury.

The first episode, which premiered on January 13, 1952, is a dramatized 30-minute version of Don Quixote starring Boris Karloff and directed by Sidney Lumet. Grace Kelly made an appearance as Dulcinea.

=== Guest stars ===
- James Dean
- Albert Dekker
- Geraldine Fitzgerald
- Audrey Hepburn
- Conrad Janis
- Boris Karloff
- Grace Kelly
- James Lipton
- Leslie Nielsen
- Sidney Poitier

=== Critical response ===
The trade publication Motion Picture Daily (MPD) commented in mid-March 1952, "After an uneven start, the CBS Television Workshop is finally settling down into the experimental groove for which it is designed." The review noted the difficulties imposed by a 30-minute time slot and mentioned that Martin Ritt performed well with the episode "The Rocket" but that the quality of the script was not as good as the quality of the acting.

A subsequent review in MPD called another episode, "The Gallow's Tree", a production that "was excitingly outstanding and provided a half-hour of captivating viewing." Geraldine Fitzgerald's performance was described as "outstanding", and the review added, "Director Robert Stevens should be congratulated on his marked imagination and skill."

== 1960 series ==
Another CBS Television Workshop was broadcast in 1960, running from January 24, 1960, through May 1, 1960, and returning to run from October 2, 1960, through December 25, 1960. The show was "an experimental anthology series" that was broadcast on Sundays from noon to 12:30 p.m. Eastern Time. The series brought "new writing, directing and acting talent to television in conjunction with performances by skilled professionals." The show was sustaining and was recorded on tape.

Episodes of the 1960 series included those shown in the table below.

Partial List of Episodes of CBS Television Workshop in 1960
Date	Title	Actors
April 3, 1960	"Tessie Malfitano"	Maureen Stapleton
April 10, 1960	"The Bible Salesman"	Rosetta LeNoire, Garrett Morris
May 1, 1960	"Afterthought"	none*
October 2, 1960	"The Dirtiest Word in the English Language"	Uta Hagen, Ben Piazza
October 9, 1960	"Another Valley"	Addison Powell, Perry Wilson, Sharon Farrell, Peter Lazer, Bob Hogan, Harry Millard, John F. Hamilton
December 4, 1960	"Flight of Fancy"	Margaret Truman, Bob Gerringer, Roy Poole, Sylvia Miles, Arthur Storch, Diana Raney, Mary Farrell, Peggy Allenby

- The trade publication Broadcasting reported, "'Afterthought' used neither actors nor words." It compared the technique to dialog-free commercials of that time, saying that the episode "tells a story of love and crime by such audio-visual devices as a florist's bill, a rejected engagement ring, a telephone click, concert tickets, flowers, soft music, the thud of a weapon, and the thump of a dead body."

=== Critical response ===
A review in the trade publication Variety said that Truman was miscast as the lead in "Flight of Fancy", making her look like "little more than a suburban housewife doing a community theatre bit". Others in the cast were described as "uniformly professional", and the script received a mixed review.
