= Stanley Thomas Williams =

Stanley Thomas Williams (25 October 1888 – 5 February 1956) was a scholar who helped to establish the study of American literature as an academic field during his teaching career at Yale University. In 1935 he was awarded a Guggenheim Fellowship. His most notable publication is a two-volume biography of Washington Irving but he is best remembered for changing the study of Herman Melville by strategically directing doctoral dissertations on his life and works.

== Career ==
Williams was born in Meriden, Connecticut and studied at Yale (B.A 1911, Ph.D. 1915). In 1915 he started to lecture at Yale, served as a second lieutenant in the Army Signal Corps, in 1932 became a Full Professor, from 1934 Colgate Professor, and in 1944 Sterling Professor. Williams followed William Lyon Phelps, who held the only academic chair in existence for the field. He was chair of his department in 1939–1945. Publishing initially on English literature of the eighteenth and nineteenth-century, from the mid-1920s on he concentrated on American literature, which was handled as a young branch of English literature. His interest initially was in Nathaniel Hawthorne and Washington Irving, but in the late 1930s he turned his attention to Melville, though publishing only incidental works himself.

Williams used his influential position at Yale in developing the study of American literature as a field. He serving on the board of editors for the Literary History of the United States and the journal, American Literature. In collaboration with the historian Ralph Henry Gabriel he taught the undergraduate course "American Thought and Civilization," the first course in the field of American Studies, which became an independent field of academic study only in the 1950s. He retired in 1953. His successor on the chair was Charles Feidelson, Jr. He died on 5 February 1956 in New Haven, Connecticut.

== Scholarly achievement and role in Melville studies ==
In 1935 Williams published a biography of Washington Irving in two volumes. After publishing this biography, Williams decided to turn his attention to Herman Melville. He directed his graduate students to do research on particular aspects or particular works in order to test the findings of the first generation of Melville scholars, known as the Melville Revival of the 1920s. "One man", said one of his students later, was "responsible for the proliferation of Melville studies in the 1940s." Williams directed eleven dissertations on Melville and three more in the 1950s, the majority by students who would become important Melville scholars and published their dissertations as books. Among his students were Elizabeth A. Foster (1941), Merton M. Sealts, Jr. (1942), Walter E. Bezanson (1943), Harrison M. Hayford (1945), Merrell R. Davis (1947), William H. Gilman (1947), Nathalia Wright (1949), James Baird, Charles Feidelson, Jr., Tyrus Hillway, and Henry F. Pommer. Williams did not strike all his students as charismatic, but studying with him had what another of his students called a "mystique" that markedly affected them.

== Bibliography ==
- Richard Cumberland, His Life and Dramatic Works (1917)
- Studies in Victorian Literature (1923)
- The American Spirit in Letters (1926)
- American Literature (1937)
- The Life of Washington Irving (1935)
- Beginnings of American Poetry, 1620-1855 (1951)
- The Spanish Background of American Literature (1955)
- as editor: Tour in Scotland, 1817, and other manuscript notes, by Washington Irving. Yale U. Press. 1927.

== Essays ==
- In Literary History of the United States (1948): among others "Washington Irving", "Nathaniel Hawthorne"
- In Eight American Authors (1956): "Melville"
