= Raymond Weaver =

Raymond Melbourne Weaver
- Born: 1888; Baltimore, Maryland
- Died: April 4, 1948 (aged 59–60); New York City
- Occupations: university professor, teacher, literary historian
- Known for: Leader of Melville Revival

Raymond Melbourne Weaver (1888 – April 4, 1948) was a professor of English and comparative literature at Columbia University in 1916–1948, and a literary scholar best known for publishing Herman Melville: Mariner and Mystic, the first full biography of American author Herman Melville (1819–1891) in 1921 and editing Melville's works. Weaver's scholarly credentials, training, and persuasiveness were important in launching the "Melville Revival" of the 1920s that brought Melville from obscurity to wide recognition.

Weaver was an influential teacher. He published a novel, wrote introductions for editions of American fiction, book reviews, and literary essays, but never published another scholarly book after his book on Melville.

== Discovery of Melville ==
Weaver was born in Baltimore, Maryland, in 1888. In 1909 when Weaver was an undergraduate, he came across Melville's first book, Typee, but "stopped at the beginning," as he later wrote, and did not return to Melville for another decade. He graduated from Columbia Teachers College in 1910. In pursuit of teaching, he went to Japan, where he taught English in Hiroshima, and started his career as a writer by publishing articles of travel and reporting. He returned to become a graduate student at Columbia University, where his initial interest was in the literature of the Renaissance.

Weaver first taught at Brooklyn Polytechnic Institute, then was hired by Columbia to replace a socialist professor who had been fired because of his peace activities. Weaver left to teach again at Brooklyn Polytechnic, only to return to Columbia for good in 1922.

Carl Van Doren, then an editor of The Nation magazine, had discovered the works of Melville and was impressed by Weaver's "ability to deal with a speculative subject." When they were seated side by side at a faculty dinner, Van Doren commissioned Weaver to write an article for The Nation to mark the centennial of Melville's birth in November 1919. Weaver at first thought the project would be "child's play" and "a day's job," but when he went to the library, he was surprised to find that while there were many works by Melville there was almost nothing about him. Weaver's article for The Nation said that Moby-Dick was "born in hell-fire, and baptized in an unspeakable name" and that it "reads like a great opium dream," but contains "some of the most finished comedy in the language."

Preparing that article led to a realization that a biography was needed, and his decision to fill that gap made Weaver the key player in the "Melville revival" which had been gathering momentum. At Van Doren's urging, he launched into deeper research. In particular, he won the confidence of Melville's granddaughter, Eleanor Metcalf, who had inherited the Melville family papers and documents. Weaver's most important discovery among these papers was the unfinished manuscript for Billy Budd on which Melville had been working at the time of his death in 1891.

== Herman Melville: Mariner and Mystic ==
Herman Melville: Mariner and Mystic (1921) was the first full-length study of Melville. Weaver presents Melville as a disappointed and disillusioned genius who rebelled against social convention and paid the price: "His whole history is the record of an attempt to escape from an inexorable and intolerable world of reality." Weaver praises Melville for establishing the South Seas as a suitable topic for literature and for his depictions of a sailor's sea-life, but saved his highest praise for Moby-Dick, Melville's "undoubted masterpiece." But Weaver saw the cold reception from critics as leading to the "Long Quietus," that is, Melville's withdrawal from engagement with literature. He characterized Melville's work after 1851 as inferior, sometimes even unacceptable.

The warm reception and wide circulation of Weaver's biography made it a prime source for later biographers who were not always aware that, in the words of a recent Melville scholar, "it is often inaccurate in its details and too dependent on Melville's travel narratives for autobiographical reference and documentation." Later scholars also hold Weaver partly responsible for the idea that Melville withdrew from literature; it is now more widely held that he turned to poetry, a genre in which he is now recognized as a leader.

== Billy Budd ==
In 1924 Weaver published Melville's Billy Budd, whose manuscript he had found in 1919. It appeared in the last volume of a 13-volume edition of Melville's works which he helped the British publisher Constable & Co. prepare.

In the introduction, Weaver called "Billy Budd" a "novel finished by Melville five months before his death," although later scholars established that in fact Melville was still revising the work when he died. Weaver wrote in the Introduction for the 1928 edition for Horace Liveright entitled The Shorter Novels of Herman Melville that the story was "witness to [Melville's] ultimate faith that evil is defeat and natural goodness invincible in the affections of man." He compared Billy Budd with Pierre, saying that each "ends in disaster and death" and that "each is a tragedy (as was Melville's life)...." Tragedy, Weaver went on, was not the representation of human misery," but" the representation of human goodness or nobility," for only when "worldly disaster has worked its utmost can we realize that there remains something in man's soul which is for ever beyond the grasp of the accidents of existence, with power in its own right to make life beautiful. Only through tragedy of this type could Melville affirm his everlasting yea..."

== Black Valley ==
Weaver's 1927 novel Black Valley is set in Japan, where Weaver had taught English for three years, and presents a critical view of missionaries and intense psychological family relations. The reviewer in The New York Times called it a "strange novel" and compared it to E.M. Forster's 1924 A Passage to India in their doubts about the superiority of the West over the East. The reviewer concluded that Weaver was "no great lover of the gospel in far lands." The novel pictured the "sincere but wasted effort of a community of evangelical Christians engaged in a sort of spiritual shadow boxing, raiding the heathen for an occasional convert and, when off-duty, indulging in a good deal of spiteful and narrow gossip....." The plot revolves around a bigoted missionary, his dying wife, their son, who has fallen in love with a Japanese girl, and an older woman whose almost sexual doting on the son turns to revulsion when she sees him in the arms of the Japanese girl.

== Teaching career at Columbia ==
The General Honors program at Columbia, which emphasized the close reading of Great Books of Western Civilization, was developed by a group of faculty who, in the words of a semi-official history, "were at odds with the research ethos that permeated their departments" and who "saw themselves as teachers and only incidentally as professors...." They may also, the history adds, have placed a higher value on "the good life" than on a "successful career." Weaver, known to his friends as "Buck," was a leading member of this group, which included Mark Van Doren (with whom he shared an office), Irwin Edman, and Mortimer J. Adler, among others. Weaver continued to teach Dante and Renaissance literature, however, in addition to the General Honors course.

A memoir of the college at this time evoked Weaver:

Raymond Weaver was celebrated for a multitude of eminences. He had invented Herman Melville; he had lived in Japan; he wore plus fours in which he could have carried his entire library; he spoke with an accent of perfect clarity and force, but which apart from him was never heard on land or sea. He dramatized the whole of life which was wonderful for the teaching of literature and aesthetics but petrifying in personal relations. He could ask the eternal pedagogic question: "What do you mean, Mr. Doe, by 'interesting'?", and make it sound like an irrefutable accusation of incompetence; and yet he did not merely terrify, he taught. What he taught was an outlook of combined wonder and critical resiliency. Never to take literary platitudes at their face value, and never to become a cheap skeptic...

Students recalled his disdain for popular literature. One story recounted decades later was that Weaver was at a cocktail party in the late 1930s when a guest asked him if he had read Gone With the Wind. When he said no, the guest said, "Well, you should. It's been out six months." The professor then asked the guest if he had read The Divine Comedy. When the guest said no, the professor said, "Well, you should. It's been out 600 years." Another student recalled Weaver's sang–froid after a heavy snow-storm knocked out power to the upper west side of New York and left others without water. Weaver appeared on campus freshly shaved. When a student asked how he had done it, and Weaver replied, "I boiled ice cubes."

By the mid-1930s, Weaver had lost interest in Melville. He freely gave advice to Charles Olson in preparing his study, Call Me Ishmael, published in 1947, but declined to read the manuscript that Olson submitted for publication. His Columbia colleague Lionel Trilling later said that Weaver "came to regard Melville with some irony, as too much a romantic," and that Weaver preferred Dante and Italian Renaissance writers. Weaver was given tenure in 1937, but since he never completed his PhD (and perhaps because he was open about his homosexuality), he was not promoted to full professor until 1946. Weaver died in his apartment near Columbia University in New York City, on the morning of April 4, 1948, at the age of 59. He had recently been treated at a New York hospital, apparently for suicidal depression.

== Students ==
Among the Columbia students who acknowledged Weaver as an important influence was Joseph Campbell, the future scholar of mythology. Weaver told Campbell in the 1920s that he should not continue PhD work because he would not find what he was looking for in graduate school, but gave him a list of readings. Another who credited Weaver was the publisher Robert Giroux.

In the early 1930s Lionel Trilling was first a student and then a colleague. Trilling's wife recalled that Weaver was "outspokenly hostile until a long time afterward when his enmity changed into affection as precipitously as it had appeared..." After Weaver's death, Trilling said that he was "personally and intensely implicated in every idea he ever dealt with. He related every moment of the classroom to life, and his vision of life was heroic."

In the 1940s the Beat novelist Jack Kerouac and the Beat poet Allen Ginsberg were close to Weaver. Ginsberg, who was uncomfortable in the homophobic atmosphere at Columbia, recalled that Weaver was gay, and Kerouac recalled that Weaver gave him a list of books on Zen Buddhism, Plotinus, Melville's novel Pierre, and the American Transcendentalists.

== Evaluations of Weaver's role in the Melville Revival ==
The scholars who came after him credit Weaver with writing the first biography of Melville and launching the Melville Revival, but also point out weaknesses in interpretation and misstatements which came from lack of information. The scholar F. O. Matthiessen wrote in 1941 that Weaver devoted only two chapters, an eighth of his biography, to all of Melville's career after Moby-Dick, and that "this foreshortening was disproportionate..." Calling these two chapters "The Great Refusal" and "The Long Quietus" created an impression of Melville's "collapse into misanthrophy if not actual insanity...."

Later Melvillians further hold Weaver among those responsible for the lingering notion that Melville suffered from an inability to write after Moby-Dick. The "narrative of Melville the Failed Poet," says Elizabeth Renker, is entirely misleading. Weaver used the phrase the "Long Quietus" to envision Melville's three decades of "prolific poetic production as an extended period of failing artistic power that amounted to nothing but silence." In fact, Renker argues, while Melville wrote fiction for only a little more than a decade, he wrote and published poems for more than 30 years.

== Major publications ==
- —— (April 1919). "The Centennial of Herman Melville". Nation. Reprinted in One Hundred Years of The Nation: A Centennial Anthology. Ed. Henry M. Christman and Abraham Feldman (New York: Macmillan, 1965), pp. 113–18.
- —— (1921). Herman Melville, Mariner and Mystic. New York: G. H. Doran. Frequently reprinted. Full online text HathiTrust
- The Pequod Edition of Herman Melville's Collected Works, which was abandoned by the publisher after four volumes:

Melville, Herman (1924). Israel Potter, His Fifty Years Exile. Edited and introduced by Raymond M. Weaver. New York: A. & C. Boni.
Melville, Herman (1924). Redburn, His First Voyage. Edited and introduced by Raymond M. Weaver. New York: A. & C. Boni.
Melville, Herman (1925). Moby-Dick, or The Whale. Edited and introduced by Raymond M. Weaver. New York: A. & C. Boni.
Melville, Herman (1925). Mardi and a Voyage Thither. Edited and introduced by Raymond M. Weaver. New York: A. & C. Boni.

- —— (1926). Black Valley. New York: Viking.
- Melville, Herman (1932). Shorter Novels of Herman Melville. Black and Gold Library. Edited and introduced by Raymond M. Weaver. New York: Horace Liveright.
- Melville, Herman (1935). Journal up the Straits. Edited and introduced by Raymond M. Weaver. New York: The Colophon.
