= List of Guggenheim Fellowships awarded in 1934 =

Forty scholars and artists received Guggenheim Fellowships in 1934.

== 1934 U.S. and Canadian Fellows ==
Category	Field of Study	Fellow	Institutional association	Research topic	Notes	Ref
Creative Arts	Choreography	Angna Enters		Ancient Greek art forms	Also won in 1935	
Creative Arts	Fiction	Leonard Ehrlich		Writing	Also won in 1933	
Creative Arts	Fiction	Albert Halper		Writing		
Creative Arts	Fiction	Younghill Kang		Writing	Also won in 1933	
Creative Arts	Fiction	Alexander Laing		Writing		
Creative Arts	Fiction	George Milburn		Writing		
Creative Arts	Fiction	Tom Tippett		Certain aspects of the coal industry in the United States		
Creative Arts	Fine Arts	Peggy Bacon		Book of caricatures, Off With Their Heads!		
Creative Arts	Fine Arts	Howard Norton Cook		Mural painting	Also won in 1933	
Creative Arts	Fine Arts	Francis Criss		Fresco painting		
Creative Arts	Fine Arts	Maurice Glickman		Sculptor		
Creative Arts	Fine Arts	Rosella Hartman		Lithography		
Creative Arts	Fine Arts	Frank Mechau		Painting	Also won in 1935, 1938	
Creative Arts	Music Composition	Douglas Stuart Moore	Columbia University	Composing		
Creative Arts	Music Composition	William Grant Still		Composing	Also won in 1935, 1938	
Creative Arts	Poetry	Conrad Aiken		Writing		
Creative Arts	Poetry	Kay Boyle		Writing	Also won in 1961	
Creative Arts	Poetry	Isidor Schneider		Writing	Also won in 1936	
Creative Arts	Theatre Arts	Norris Houghton		Dramatic arts	Also won in 1935, 1960	
Humanities	Classics	Sterling Dow	Harvard University	Athenian public documents	Also won in 1959, 1966	
Humanities	English Literature	Howard F. Lowry	College of Wooster	Lives and works of Matthew Arnold and Arthur Hugh Clough		
Humanities	French Literature	Geoffroy Atkinson	Amherst College	French Renaissance		
Humanities	Fine Arts Research	Rudolf Meyer Riefstahl	New York University	Islamic ceramics		
Humanities	Iberian and Latin American History	Frank Tannenbaum		Agrarian problems in Peru and Argentina	Also won in 1932	
Humanities	Literary Criticism	J. N. Douglas Bush	University of Minnesota	English poetry		
Humanities	Literary Criticism	Fulmer Mood		Early American colonization	Also won in 1932	
Humanities	Philosophy	Ernest Nagel	Columbia University	Mathematics	Also won in 1950	
Humanities	Russian History	William Henry Chamberlin		Russian Revolution, 1917-1921	Also won in 1931	
Humanities	United States History	Grace Lee Nute	Hamline University; Minnesota Historical Society	Biography of Pierre-Esprit Radisson and Medard Chouart		
Natural Sciences	Chemistry	Francis William Bergstrom	Stanford University			
Natural Sciences	Chemistry	Frank Harold Spedding	University of California	Heterocyclic compounds containing nitrogen		
Natural Sciences	Mathematics	Arnold Dresden	Swarthmore College	Calculus of variations		
Natural Sciences	Medicine and Health	Allan Lyle Grafflin	Harvard University		Also won in 1937	
Natural Sciences	Molecular and Cellular Biology	George Oswald Burr	University of Minnesota	Photosynthesis		
Natural Sciences	Molecular and Cellular Biology	Michael Heidelberger	Columbia University	Molecular weight of thyroglobulin	Also won in 1936	
Natural Sciences	Organismic Biology and Ecology	Harold Kirby, Jr.	University of California, Berkeley			
Natural Sciences	Physics	Kenneth Bainbridge	Harvard University		Also won in 1933	
Natural Sciences	Physics	Robert Bigham Brode	University of California	Collisions of electrons with atoms		

== 1934 Latin American and Caribbean Fellows ==
Category	Field of Study	Fellow	Institutional association	Research topic	Notes	Ref
Natural Sciences	Medicine and Health	Atilio Macchiavello Varas	Sanitary Inspection Service, Chile; Chilean Antiplague Service	Preventitive medicine and public health, particularly problems of typhus in Chile	Also won in 1935	
Natural Sciences	Organismic Biology and Ecology	Alfonso Dampf Tenson	Ministry of Agriculture, Mexico	Simuliidae of Central and South America in relation to the transmission of onchocercosis		
Natural Sciences	Organismic Biology and Ecology	Luis Hugo Howell Rivero	University of Havana	West Indian fish	Also won in 1935	
Natural Sciences	Physics	Ramón Enrique Gaviola	University of Buenos Aires	Photochemistry		
Social Sciences	Anthropology and Cultural Studies	Alfredo Barrera Vásquez	National University of Mexico	Translation of the Chilam Balam and Maya linguistics	Also won in 1933	

== See also ==
- Guggenheim Fellowship
- List of Guggenheim Fellowships awarded in 1933
- List of Guggenheim Fellowships awarded in 1935
