= Ralph Henry Gabriel =

American historian (1890–1987)

- Born: April 29, 1890; Reading, New York, U.S.
- Died: April 25, 1987 (aged 96); Hamden, Connecticut, U.S.
- Spouse: Mary Christine Davis (m. 1917)
- Children: 3

Academic background
- Education: Yale University (BA, MA, PhD)

Academic work
- Sub-discipline: American intellectual history
- Institutions: Yale University
- Doctoral students: David M. Potter

Ralph Henry Gabriel (April 29, 1890 – April 25, 1987) was an American historian. He held the Sterling Professor Emeritus of History at Yale University and was the founding father of the American Studies Association.

== Early life and education ==
Gabriel was born on April 29, 1890, in Reading, New York, to parents Cleveland and Alta Monroe Gabriel. He earned his Bachelor of Arts, Masters of Arts and Ph.D. at Yale University before serving in the U.S. Army Infantry during World War I.

== Career ==
Gabriel joined the faculty of Yale in 1915. Simultaneously, Gabriel was hired as a general editor of The Pageant of America, an eventual 15-volume series of pictorial history of the development of the United States.

In 1931, he collaborated with Stanley Thomas Williams, an English professor, to teach a course entitled "American Thought and Civilization." He claimed the course "stressed the systematic study of the history of the viewpoints of American writers, scholars, statesmen and reformers." Afterwards, Gabriel served as chairman of the history department from 1931 to 1934. Fellow professor William Robert Hutchison cited Gabriel as a mentor in the history department and called him a "perennial teacher and friend". In 1938, Gabriel worked alongside Mabel B. Casner, a Connecticut schoolteacher, to publish The Rise of American Democracy.

A few years later, in 1940, Gabriel published The course of American democratic thought through the Ronald Press Company. Although writing as a historian, Gabriel used anthropology to examine how America's "climate of opinion" affected society. He would go on to serve as director of Yale Studies for Returning Service Men from 1944 to 1946 and lecture at the United States School of Military Government. He held the title of Larned Professor of American History from 1935 to 1948 before he was appointed to a Sterling Professor. In 1941, Gabriel published a biography on Elias Boudinot through the University of Oklahoma Press. In 1946, Gabriel founded a new department at Yale, entitled the American Studies Department, and later went on to be a founding father of the American Studies Association. However, Gabriel would end up resigning from the American Studies Department in protest during the Cold War. Gabriel was upset that Yale accepted a $500,000 donation on the condition the department focus on "the fundamental principles of American freedom in the field of politics and economics in order to combat the meaning of foreign philosophies". As he remained a professor at Yale, Gabriel achieved the rank of a professor emeritus in 1958 after he retired that June.

In 1958, Gabriel served as a committee member on the US National Commission for UNESCO and was a US delegate at the UNESCO conference in Paris. During his lengthy tenure at Yale, Gabriel also served as the editor of the Library of Congress Series in American Civilization.

== Awards and honors ==
In 1958, Gabriel was the recipient of an honorary degree from Williams College.

In 1966, Gabriel was awarded a DeVane Medal from Yale's Phi Beta Kappa chapter. In 1975, he was the recipient of the Wilbur Cross Medal for "distinguished achievements in scholarship, teaching, academic administration, and public service".

Every year, the American Studies Association awards the Ralph Henry Gabriel Prize to the best doctoral dissertation in American studies, ethnic studies, or women's studies.

== Personal life ==
Gabriel married Mary Christine Davis in 1917 and they had three children together.

== Selected publications ==
The following is a list of selected publications:

- Elias Boudinot, Cherokee & his America (1941)
- The Rise of American Democracy (1951)
- The course of American democratic thought: an intellectual history since 1815 (1956)
- Traditional values in American life (1960)
- American values: continuity and change (1974)
