= Rosella Hartman =

American artist

- Born: May 23, 1895
- Died: March 5, 1984 (aged 88)
- Education: Art Institute of Chicago, Art Students League of New York
- Known for: Painting, Etching, Lithography
- Spouse: Paul Fiene
- Awards: Guggenheim Fellowship

Rosella Hartman (May 23, 1895 — March 5, 1984) was an American painter, etcher, and lithographer. She studied at both the Art Institute of Chicago and the Art Students League of New York. She was awarded a Guggenheim Fellowship in 1934 and 1938 to study graphic arts abroad. Hartman married a sculptor, Paul Fiene (1899–1949) and lived in Woodstock, New York, then a leading center for the arts.

Hartman exhibited at multiple galleries in New York during the 1930s, and some of her work was published through the Works Progress Administration, Federal Art Project. Harman illustrated Big Red Barn by Margaret Wise Brown in 1956. Examples of her work are included in the collections of the Whitney Museum of American Art, the Philadelphia Museum of Art, the Baltimore Museum of Art, and the Museum of Modern Art, New York.
