= Billy Budd (film) =

1962 film by Peter Ustinov

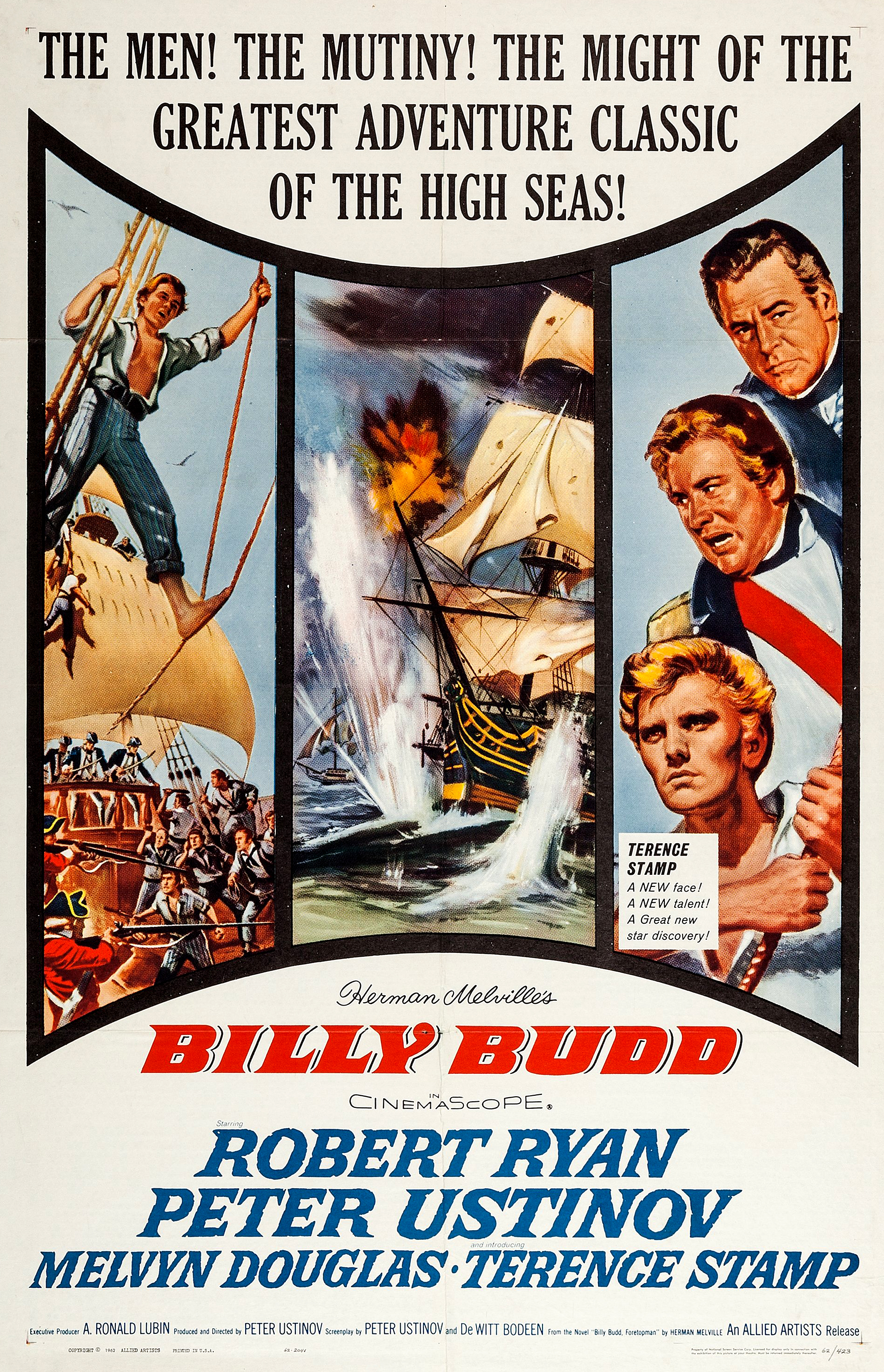
- Original film poster
- Directed by: Peter Ustinov
- Screenplay by: Peter Ustinov; Robert Rossen; DeWitt Bodeen
- Based on: Billy Budd (1924 novella) by Herman Melville; Billy Budd (1949 play) by; Louis O. Coxe; Robert H. Chapman
- Produced by: Peter Ustinov
- Starring: Robert Ryan; Peter Ustinov; Melvyn Douglas; Terence Stamp
- Cinematography: Robert Krasker
- Edited by: Jack Harris
- Music by: Antony Hopkins
- Production company: Anglo Allied Pictures
- Distributed by: Rank Film Distributors (UK); Allied Artists (USA)
- Release date: 21 September 1962 (London)
- Running time: 123 minutes
- Country: United Kingdom
- Language: English
- Budget: $1.2-$1.5 million
- Box office: $25 million

Billy Budd is a 1962 British historical adventure-drama film produced, directed, and co-written by Peter Ustinov. It is adapted from Louis O. Coxe and Robert H. Chapman's stage play version of Herman Melville's 1924 novella of the same name. Terence Stamp, in his film debut, plays the title role, with Robert Ryan as John Claggart, Melvyn Douglas as the Dansker, and Ustinov as Captain Vere.

The film was released by Rank Film Distributors on September 21, 1962. It received generally positive reviews with film critic Pauline Kael calling it "one of the best films of 1962." It was nominated for five BAFTA Awards, including Best Film and Outstanding British Film. For his first-ever film role, Stamp was nominated for an Academy Award for Best Supporting Actor and a BAFTA Award for Most Promising Newcomer to Leading Film Roles, and received a Golden Globe Award for New Star of the Year – Actor.

== Plot ==
In the year 1797, the British naval vessel HMS Avenger presses into service a crewman "according to the Rights of War" from the merchant ship The Rights of Man. The new crewman, Billy Budd, is considered naive by his shipmates, and they attempt to indoctrinate him in their cynicism. But Budd's steadfast optimism remains; when asked to critique the horrible stew the crew must eat, he offers "It's hot. And there's a lot of it. I like everything about it except the flavor." The crew discovers Budd stammers in his speech when anxious.

Though Budd manages to enchant the crew, his attempts at befriending the brutal master-at-arms, John Claggart, are unsuccessful. Claggart is cruel and unrepentant, a man who controls the crew through vicious flogging, savaging them before they can prey on him. In a scene on deck alone with Billy, Claggart is lit with shadows on his brows resembling satanic horns. Meanwhile, Captain Edwin Fairfax Vere observes Billy taking initiative, and promotes him to Captain of the Foretop, despite Claggart's objection.

Claggart orders his assistant, Squeak, to find a means of implicating Budd in a planned mutiny. Claggart then brings his charges to Vere, who summons Budd to his cabin. When Claggart makes his false charges that Budd is a conspirator, Budd stammers, unable to find the words to respond, and in frustration strikes Claggart, who falls backward against a block and dies.

Captain Vere assembles a court-martial. Though aware of the background to Budd and Claggart's conflict, and even convinced of Budd's innocence in the mutiny, the captain is torn between morality and duty to his station. Vere intervenes in the final stages of deliberations - which at that point are in support of aquitting Budd - to argue the defendant must be found guilty for even striking Claggart, not to mention killing him. His argument that the letter of the law matters carries, and Budd is convicted.

Condemned to be hanged from the ship's yardarm at dawn the following morning, Budd takes care to wear his good shoes. At Budd's final words, "God bless Captain Vere!", Vere crumbles, and Budd is subsequently hoisted up and hanged on the ship's rigging. The crew is on the verge of mutiny over the incident, but Vere can only stare off into the distance. Just as the crew is to be fired upon by the ship's marine detachment, a French vessel appears and commences cannon fire on the Avenger. The crew breaks off from the potential mutiny to return fire, and in the course of battle a piece of the ship's rigging falls on Vere, killing him. The ship's figurehead is also shot off while a narrator tells of Budd's heroic sacrifice.

== Cast ==
- Terence Stamp as Billy Budd
- Robert Ryan as John Claggart, Master d'Arms
- Peter Ustinov as Edwin Fairfax Vere, Post Captain
- Melvyn Douglas as The Dansker, sailmaker
- Paul Rogers as Philip Seymour, 1st Lieutenant
- John Neville as Julian Radcliffe, 2nd Lieutenant
- David McCallum as Steven Wyatt, Gunnery Officer
- Ronald Lewis as Enoch Jenkins, maintopman
- Lee Montague as Squeak, Mr. Claggart's assistant
- Thomas Heathcote as Alan Payne, maintopman
- Ray McAnally as William O'Daniel, maintopman
- Robert Brown as Arnold Talbot, maintopman
- John Meillon as Neil Kincaid, maintopman
- Cyril Luckham as Hallam, Captain of Marines
- Niall MacGinnis as Captain Nathaniel Graveling, RMS The Rights of Man
- Victor Brooks as Amos Leonard, First Mate, The Rights of Man
- Barry Keegan as Charles Matthews, able seaman, The Rights of Man

== Production ==
In addition to serving as director, Ustinov also produces and co-stars in the feature. His dedication to the film appears to emanate from his identification with the characters in the story. He said, "I am an optimist, unrepentant and militant. After all, in order not to be a fool an optimist must know how sad a place the world can be. It is only the pessimist who finds this out anew every day."

On the novel itself, Melville had been writing poetry for 30 years when he returned to fiction with Billy Budd in late 1888. Still unfinished when he died in 1891, Melville's widow worked to help complete it, but it remained unpublished. Melville's biographer accidentally stumbled upon it when going through a trunk of the writer's papers in his granddaughter's New Jersey home in 1919, and it was finally published in 1924. Over the years other versions were published, but it was not until Melville's original notes were found that the definitive version was ultimately published in 1962. Coincidentally, this movie version, made in continental Europe and England, was released the same year.

== Release ==
The original distributors, Warner Bros. Pathe, were unhappy with the film, particularly the ending, so the Rank Organisation took over distribution.

=== Theatrical ===
In its opening weekend in Leicester Square, London, it grossed a house record $12,000.

== Reception ==
Variety called it "a near miss".

Stanley Kauffmann of The New Republic wrote Billy Budd was 'in almost every way a failure, and it is Ustinov's fault.'.

The review aggregator website Rotten Tomatoes reports an 92% approval rating based on 12 reviews.

=== Awards and nominations ===
Award	Category	Nominee(s)	Result	Ref.
Academy Awards	Best Supporting Actor	Terence Stamp	Nominated	
British Academy Film Awards	Best Film from any Source		Nominated	
British Academy Film Awards	Best British Film		Nominated	
British Academy Film Awards	Best Foreign Actor	Robert Ryan	Nominated	
British Academy Film Awards	Best British Screenplay	Peter Ustinov, DeWitt Bodeen	Nominated	
British Academy Film Awards	Most Promising Newcomer to Leading Film Roles	Terence Stamp	Nominated	
Directors Guild of America Awards	Outstanding Directorial Achievement in Motion Pictures	Peter Ustinov	Nominated	
Golden Globe Awards	Most Promising Newcomer – Male	Terence Stamp	Won	
National Board of Review Awards	Top Ten Films		2nd Place	
Writers Guild of America Awards	Best Written American Drama	Peter Ustinov, DeWitt Bodeen	Nominated	

== Home video ==
Billy Budd was released to home video by Warner Bros. via Warner Archive on July 10, 2018 as a Region 1 Blu-Ray.
