= Phoenix Theatre (New York City) =

Former off-Broadway theater (1953–1982) in Manhattan, New York City

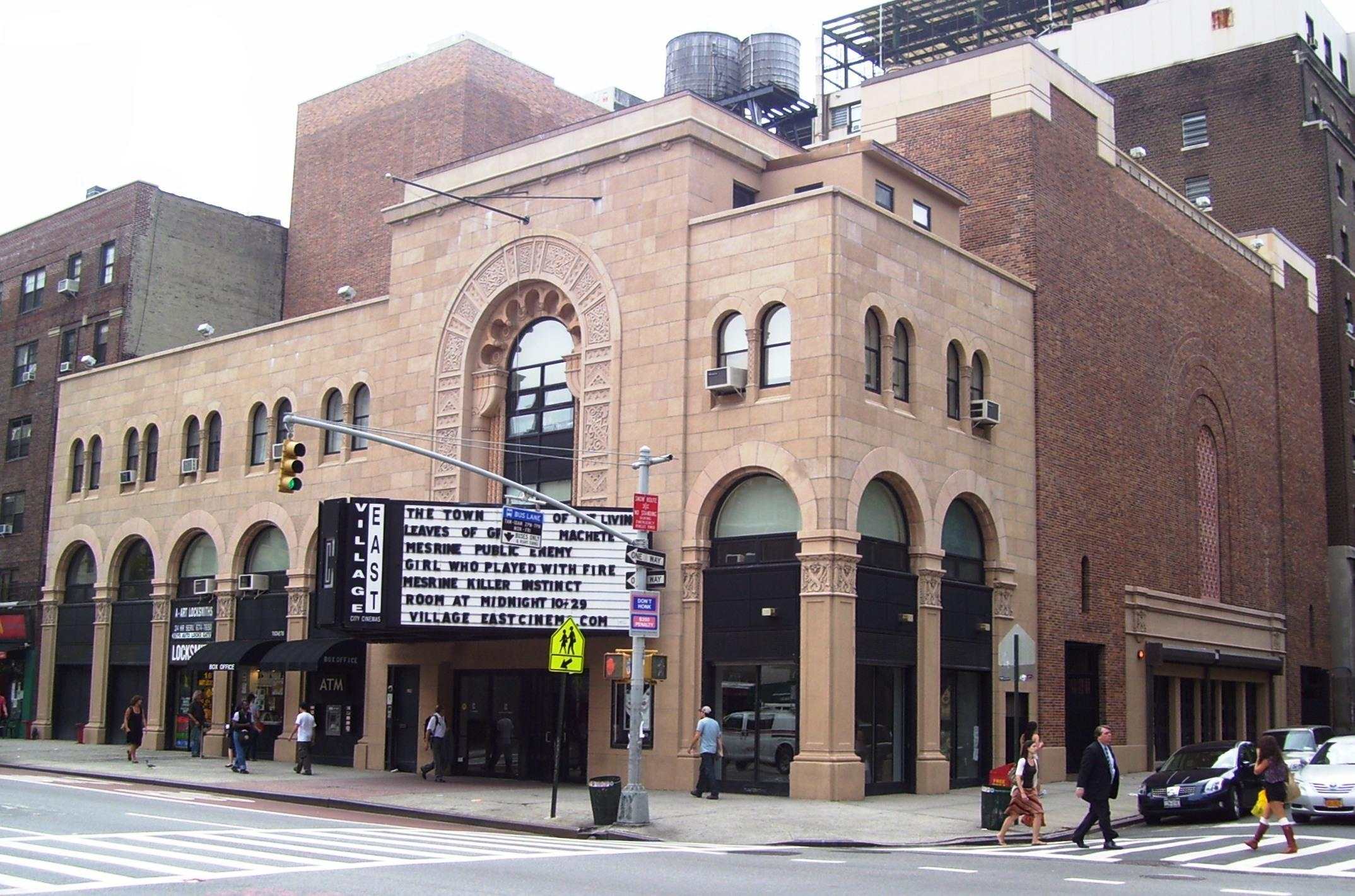
- The Village East Cinema building housed the Phoenix Theatre, 1953–1961
- Formation: 1953
- Founders: Norris Houghton and T. Edward Hambleton
- Dissolved: 1962
- Type: Theatre group

The Phoenix Theatre was a pioneering off-Broadway theatre in New York City, extant from 1953 to 1982. The Phoenix was founded by impresario Norris Houghton and T. Edward Hambleton. The project was a pioneering effort in the establishment of off-Broadway theatre. Houghton and Hambleton wanted a theatre away from Times Square, that would host a permanent company, abjure the star system (players would be listed alphabetically), produce four or five plays a season for limited engagements (contributors would be asked to sponsor an entire season rather than individual productions), and with ticket prices much lower than on Broadway.

The Phoenix Theatre was established in what is now the Village East Cinema at East 12th Street and Second Avenue in the East Village, far from Broadway. The building had opened in 1926 as the Yiddish Art Theatre.

== History ==
=== 1926–59 ===
The Phoenix opened on December 1, 1953, with a production of Madam Will You Walk?, Sidney Howard's last play, starring Hume Cronyn and Jessica Tandy, followed by productions of Coriolanus and The Golden Apple (which then moved to Broadway, at the Alvin Theater). The opening season concluded with The Seagull, starring Montgomery Clift, and directed by Houghton himself.

The Phoenix Theatre's opening season was judged successful. In the following seasons the theater mounted many more productions featuring notable figures of the theatre, and garnered various awards.

Associated persons included British actors Pamela Brown, Michael and Rachel Redgrave, Peggy Ashcroft; American stars Hume Cronyn, Jessica Tandy, Millie Natwick, Mildred Dunnock, Robert Ryan, Montgomery Clift, and Kaye Ballard; and directors and producers Elia Kazan, John Houseman, Robert Whitehead, and Alfred de Liagre; and writers and designers Sidney Howard, Robert Sherwood, John Latouche, Jerome Moross, Donald Oenslager, and Jean Eckart; and musicians Michael Danzi and John Serry.

Productions mounted over the span of the Phoenix Theatre's existence include The Doctor's Dilemma (George Bernard Shaw), The Master Builder (Henrik Ibsen), Story of a Soldier (music drama, Igor Stravinsky), Six Characters in Search of an Author (Luigi Pirandello), The Mother of Us All (opera, Virgil Thomson and Gertrude Stein), Measure for Measure (William Shakespeare), Livin' the Life (musical based on Mark Twain's Mississippi River tales), The Good Woman of Szechuan (Bertolt Brecht), The Taming of the Shrew (William Shakespeare), A Month in the Country (Ivan Turgenev) and Anna Christie (Eugene O'Neill).

Houghton, frustrated by the role of theatrical producer because it precluded him from directing, left the Phoenix to become a professor at Vassar College, beginning in 1959 and completely disengaging from the Phoenix within a few years. T. Edward Hambleton continued to run the Phoenix for the remainder of its existence.

=== 1960–82 ===
In 1961 the Phoenix, financially troubled, rented and moved for 30 weeks to a new and smaller house (300 seats), the East 74th Street Theater at 334 East 74th Street, during which time it called it the Phoenix 74th Street, and ceased being a repertory company. The first production at the new site was Oh Dad, Poor Dad, Mamma's Hung You in the Closet and I'm Feelin' So Sad. But two years later the Phoenix merged with Ellis Rabb's company, the Association of Producing Artists (APA), and again took up being a repertory company. The company was then called the APA-Phoenix Theatre (or APA-Phoenix Repertory Company). In 1966, the APA-Phoenix moved to the Lyceum Theatre on Broadway and remained there until 1969.

In 1969 the association with the APA ended, and the Phoenix became peripatetic, staging shows at various venues including the ANTA Washington Square Theatre, the Sheridan Square Playhouse, the 48th Street Playhouse, the Ethel Barrymore Theatre, and the Marymount Manhattan Theatre. In 1972, the Phoenix Theatre

In 1982, the Phoenix Theatre moved to a new home in the basement theatre at St. Peter's Evangelical Lutheran Church, which sits under the Citigroup Center at 619 Lexington Avenue at 54th Street. The opening production was Michael Hastings' Two Fish in the Sky. The Phoenix Theatre celebrated its new home, its new season, and its 30th anniversary with a gala soirée. But Two Fish in the Sky was panned and flopped, and hoped-for corporate support was not forthcoming. Citing insuperable financial challenges, the Phoenix announced on December 13, 1982, that it was ceasing operations. That venue is used since 1993 by York Theatre.
