= Billy Budd (play) =

Play written by Louis O. Coxe and Robert Chapman

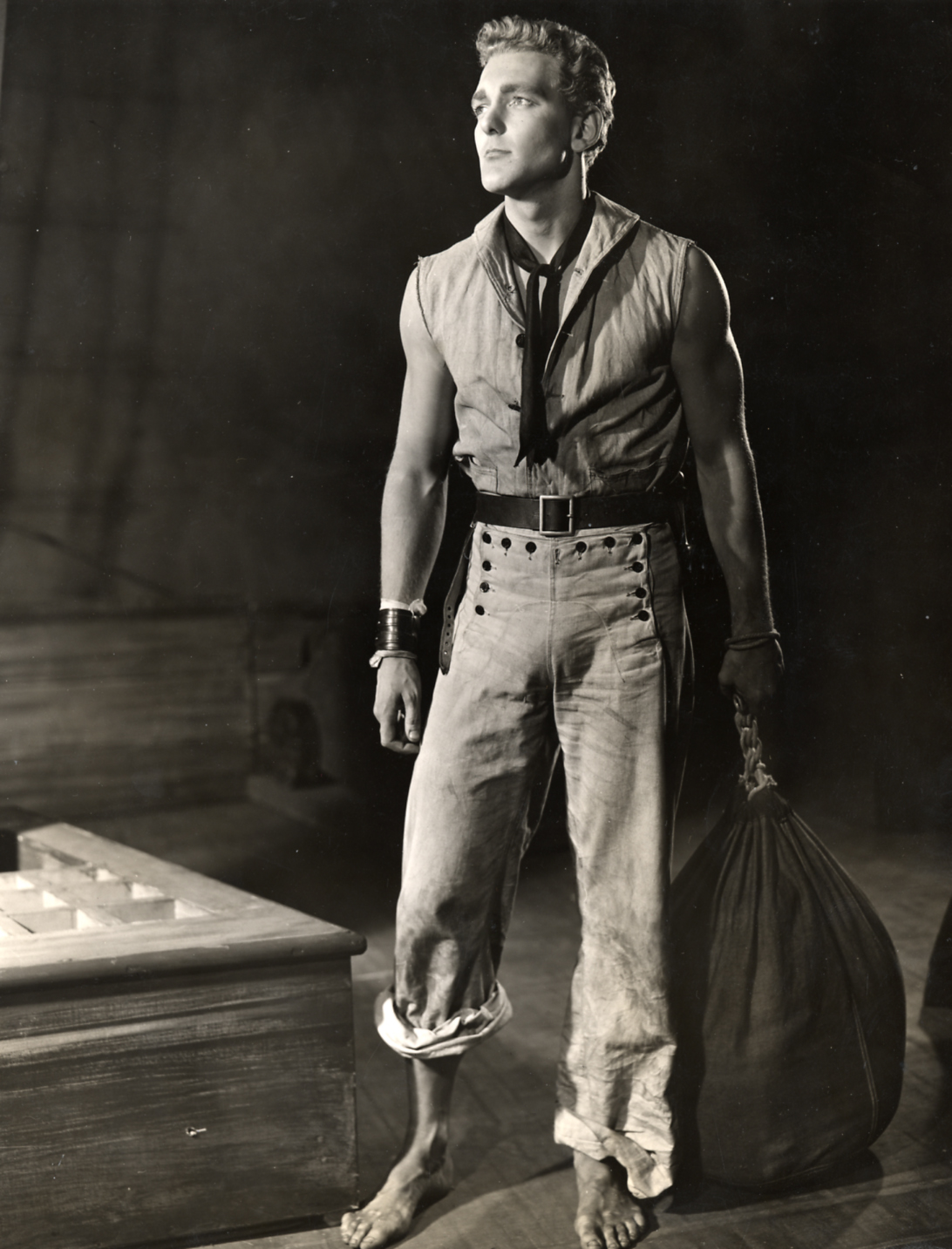
- Charles Nolte as Billy Budd in the 1951 Broadway production
- Original title: Uniform of Flesh
- Written by: Louis O. Coxe and Robert H. Chapman
- Based on: Billy Budd by Herman Melville

Premiere
- Date: January 29, 1949
- Place: Lenox Hill Theatre
- Directed by: Norris Houghton

Billy Budd is a play by Louis O. Coxe and Robert H. Chapman based on Herman Melville's novella of the same name. Originally titled Uniform of Flesh, the play premiered Off-Broadway in 1949. Coxe and Chapman restructured and retitled the work for its Broadway debut in 1951. The revised version was a critical success, winning the Donaldson Award for Best First Play and the Outer Critics Circle Award for Best Play in 1951. In 1952 the play was adapted for the television anthology series Schlitz Playhouse of Stars, and Peter Ustinov later adapted it into a film that premiered in 1962.

== Background ==
In an essay titled "Notes on the Play", the two playwrights said they first began discussing in 1947 how to adapt Melville's short novel. One thing they were convinced of is that "we saw in Billy Budd a morality play." In their view, the theme Melville presented was the conflict between good and evil, and how the world copes with such absolute embodiments as Billy Budd and John Claggart. When describing the difficulties they faced in adapting the work, Coxe and Chapman wrote:

it was only after some experimentation that we realized how little Melville had given us that was theatrical or, perhaps, finished. There was certainly little reason why he should; the drama is surely in the novel, but it is an inner, imagined drama. Our job was to put it on a stage and give flesh to the finely articulated skeleton.

== Plot ==
The play is set aboard the British naval vessel HMS Indomitable in 1798. Billy Budd is a handsome, young, and pure-hearted sailor who sees only good in other people. His counter is John Claggart, the Master-at-Arms, who is sadistic, bitter, and hateful of life.

Claggart becomes envious of Budd's popularity with the crew and falsely accuses him of mutiny. Unable to verbally defend himself due to a stutter which renders him speechless, Budd physically lashes out at Claggart in frustration and accidentally kills him. Although Captain Vere and his fellow officers comprehend that Claggart's death was not motivated by murderous intent, under the law Budd is guilty of killing a superior officer and must be hanged.

== Original version: Uniform of Flesh ==
In its original version, Uniform of Flesh, the play was structured in two acts and nine scenes. It premiered Off-Broadway on January 29, 1949, at the Lenox Hill Theatre. Directed by Norris Houghton and produced by the American National Theater and Academy, the original cast included Charles Nolte in the title role; Peter Hobbs as John Claggart, Master-at-Arms; Tom McDermott as Captain Vere; Martin Brandt as the Dansker; Winston Ross as First Officer Michael Seymour; Preston Hanson as Lieutenant Ratcliffe; Robert McQueeney as Lieutenant Wyatt; Carl Shelton as the Surgeon; Lee Marvin as Quartermaster Payne; John Fisher as Midshipman Gardiner; Everett Dwight as Midshipman Rea; Paul Anderson as Jenkins; Anthony Carr as Kincaid; Sherman Lloyd as O'Daniel; Guy Tano as the Butler; and Wynn Handman as Sentry Hallam.

== Revised version: Billy Budd ==
Coxe and Chapman reworked portions of the play; changing its structure to 3 Acts and 4 scenes. Describing the experience of revising the play, Chapman stated, "We did it in six days over a barrel of martinis. God, what a wonderful time it was!" The work was retitled Billy Budd, and was first presented in tryout performances at the Shubert Theatre in New Haven, Connecticut, from January 25 to 28, 1951; and at the Forrest Theatre in Philadelphia from January 29 to February 3, 1951.

Billy Budd debuted on Broadway on February 10, 1951, at the Biltmore Theatre. Norris Houghton also directed the Broadway production, and the work was produced by Chandler Cowles and Anthony B. Farrell. Several cast members continued with the production, including Nolte in the title role. Recast roles or added roles included Dennis King as Captain Vere, Torin Thatcher as John Claggart, Walter Burke as O'Daniel, Norman Ettlinger as Boardman Wyatt, Robert Dudley as a Sailor, Bernard Kates as Squeak, and Jack Manning as Gardiner. Paul Morrison designed the sets, and the costumes were designed by Ruth Morley. A critical success, the play won the Donaldson Award for Best First Play and the Outer Critics Circle Award for Best Play in 1951. The play was the New York Drama Critics' Circle's runner-up for best play, losing by just two votes to Sidney Kingsley's Darkness at Noon. New York Times critic Brooks Atkinson wrote,

Mr. Coxe and Mr. Chapman have written an extraordinarily skillful play that begins casually enough with the gossip and groaning of the crew. But gradually it moves out of familiar things into the tension of a moral problem that tightens the whole ship and challenges the universe ... Billy Budd has size and depth as well as color and excitement.

While reviews of Billy Budd were highly complimentary, the production struggled to draw large audiences and turn a profit. The play closed its twelve-week run on May 12, 1951, after 105 performances. In 1952 the play was adapted for the CBS television anthology series Schlitz Playhouse of Stars. Walter Hampden portrayed Captain Vere, with Nolte and Hobbs reprising their roles from the stage production. Billy Budd has been revived infrequently, most notably Off-Broadway at the Phoenix Theatre in 1955; by the Equity Community Theatre in 1959; and in several student productions in the theatre departments of American universities.

Peter Ustinov adapted the play into a film in 1962; penning the screenplay, producing, directing, and starring as Captain Edwin Fairfax Vere.
