= Robert Chapman (playwright) =

American playwright (1919–2000)

Robert Harris Chapman (April 4, 1919 – September 27, 2000) was an American playwright and longtime academic of English literature and drama at Harvard University. He is best remembered for co-authoring the 1951 Broadway play Billy Budd, adapted from Herman Melville's novel of the same name, with Louis O. Coxe. Their play won the Donaldson Award for Best First Play and the Outer Critics Circle Award for Best Play in 1951.

== Life and career ==
Born in Highland Park, Illinois, Chapman earned a bachelor's degree in English Literature from Princeton University in 1941, and an honorary master's degree from Harvard in 1956. During World War II he was stationed in Morocco and Europe while working for United States Navy intelligence with the rank of lieutenant. After the war, he taught briefly on the faculty of Princeton University before accepting a position as an instructor in the Department of Dramatic Arts at the University of California, Berkeley, where he worked from 1948 to 1950.

In 1950 Chapman joined the faculty at Harvard University as an Assistant Professor of English, and was later promoted to Associate Professor in 1956 and a Professor of English Literature in 1967. Some of the courses he taught at the university were classes on George Bernard Shaw, Restoration drama, and a course entitled "Drama Since Ibsen". His notable pupils included André Bishop, Tommy Lee Jones, John Lithgow, Arthur Kopit, and John Updike. From 1960 to 1980 he was director of the Loeb Drama Center for Harvard University and Radcliffe College. He retired from Harvard University in 1989.

As a playwright, Chapman's most successful work was an adaptation of Herman Melville's Billy Budd which he co-authored with Louis O. Coxe, a fellow faculty member at Princeton. The first version of their play, entitled Uniform of Flesh, debuted Off-Broadway at the Lenox Hill Theatre in 1949. The two men revised the work significantly, and retitled it Billy Budd for the work's staging on Broadway in 1951. While the work was financially unprofitable, it was a critical success; winning the Donaldson Award for Best First Play and the Outer Critics Circle Award for Best Play in 1951. The British actor Sir Peter Ustinov adapted the play into a film in 1962.

Chapman's other plays included The General, Hero, and The Troublesome Tourist. In addition to his work as a teacher and playwright, he served as an advisor to the Juilliard School in its organization and planning of its drama school at the Lincoln Center for the Performing Arts.

Chapman died at the age of 81 on September 27, 2000, in Fort Lauderdale, Florida, where he had lived since his retirement from Harvard.
