= Billy Budd =

1924 novella by Herman Melville

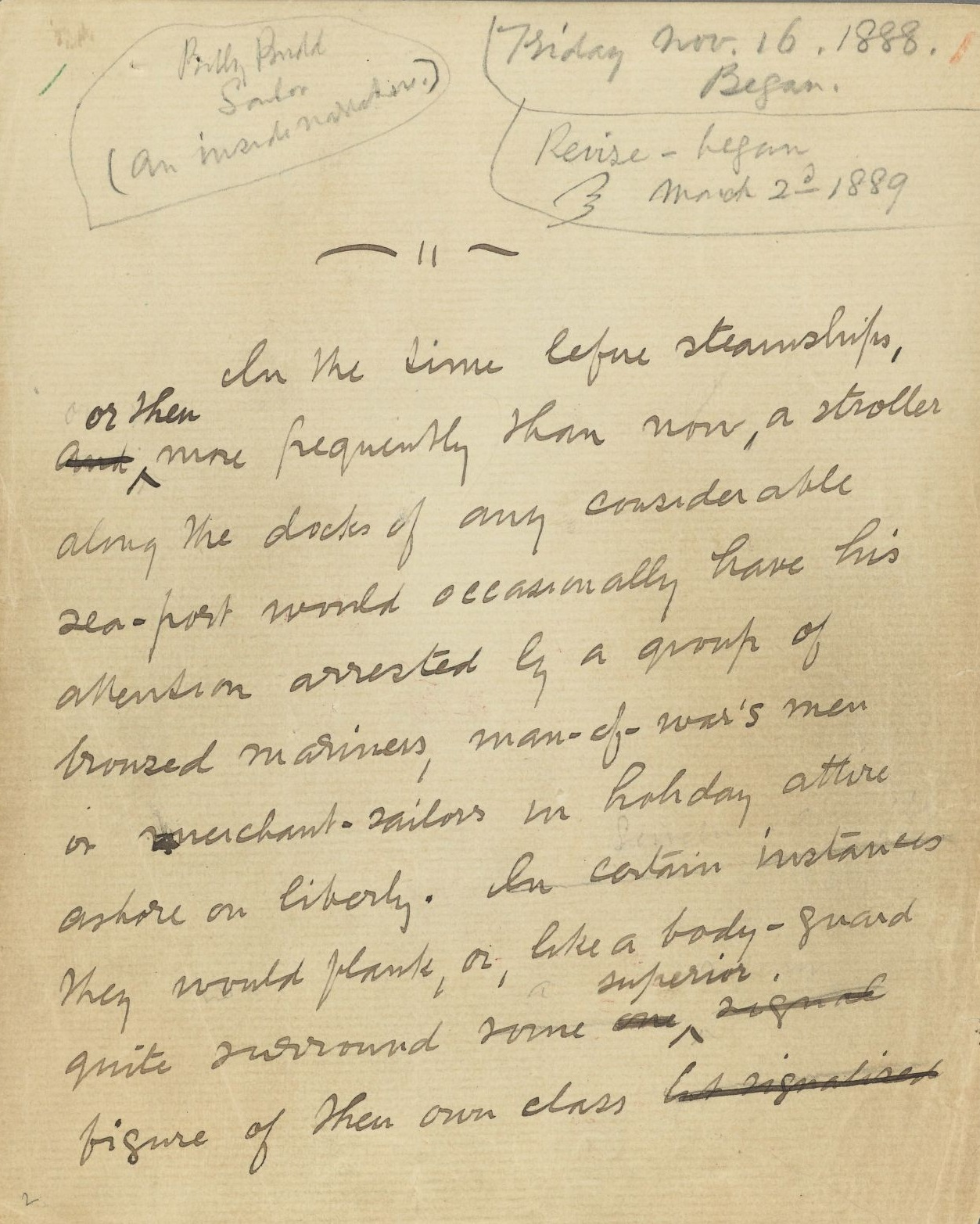
- Opening leaf of the story portion of the Billy Budd manuscript with pencil notations
- Author: Herman Melville
- Language: English
- Genre: Adventure fiction, sea story
- Publisher: London: Constable & Co.; Chicago: University of Chicago Press
- Publication date: 1924 (London); 1962 (Chicago)
- Publication place: United States, England
- Text: Billy Budd at Wikisource

Billy Budd, Sailor (An Inside Narrative), formerly known as Billy Budd, Foretopman, is a novella by American writer Herman Melville, left unfinished at his death in 1891. Acclaimed by critics as a masterpiece when a hastily transcribed version was finally published in 1924, it quickly took its place as a classic second only to Moby-Dick among Melville's works. Billy Budd is a "handsome sailor" who strikes and inadvertently kills his false accuser, the master-at-arms John Claggart, and has to face justice for his action.

Melville began work on the novella in November 1886, revising and expanding it from time to time, but he left the manuscript in disarray. His widow Elizabeth began to edit the manuscript for publication, but was not able to discern her husband's intentions at key points, even as to the book's title. Raymond M. Weaver, Melville's first biographer, was given the manuscript and published the 1924 version, which was marred by misinterpretation of Elizabeth's queries, misreadings of Melville's difficult handwriting, and even inclusion of a preface Melville had cut. Melville scholars Harrison Hayford and Merton M. Sealts Jr. published what is considered the best transcription and critical reading text in 1962. In 2017, Northwestern University Press and the Newberry Library published a "new reading text" based on a "corrected version" of Hayford and Sealts' genetic text prepared by G. Thomas Tanselle.

Billy Budd has been adapted into film, a stage play, and an opera.

== Plot summary ==
Billy Budd is an English seaman impressed into service aboard the Royal Navy warship HMS Bellipotent in 1797, when the Navy was reeling from the Spithead and Nore mutinies and threatened by the French First Republic's military ambitions. He is impressed onto Bellipotent from the British merchant ship The Rights of Man (named after the book by Thomas Paine).

Billy, a foundling from Bristol, has an innocence, good looks and a natural charisma that make him popular with the crew. He has a stutter, which becomes more noticeable when under intense emotion. He arouses the antagonism of the ship's master-at-arms, John Claggart. Claggart, while not unattractive, seems somehow "defective or abnormal in the constitution", possessing a "natural depravity." Envy is Claggart's explicitly stated emotion toward Budd, foremost because of his "significant personal beauty," and also for his innocence and general popularity. This leads Claggart to falsely charge Billy with conspiracy to mutiny. When the captain, Edward Fairfax "Starry" Vere, is presented with Claggart's charges, he summons Claggart and Billy to his cabin for a private meeting. Claggart makes his case and Billy, astounded, is unable to respond, due to his stutter. In his extreme frustration he strikes out at Claggart, killing him instantly.

Vere convenes a drumhead court-martial. He acts as convening authority, prosecutor, defense counsel and sole witness (except for Billy). He intervenes in the deliberations of the court-martial panel to persuade them to convict Billy, despite their and his beliefs in Billy's moral innocence. (Vere says in the moments following Claggart's death, "Struck dead by an angel of God! Yet the angel must hang!") Vere claims to be following the letter of the Mutiny Acts and the Articles of War.

Although Vere and the other officers did not believe Claggart's charge of conspiracy and think Billy justified in his response, they find that their own opinions matter little. The martial law in effect states that during wartime the blow itself, fatal or not, is a capital crime. The court-martial convicts Billy following Vere's argument that any appearance of weakness in the officers and failure to enforce discipline could stir more mutiny throughout the Royal Navy. Condemned to be hanged the morning after his attack on Claggart, Billy's last words prior to his execution are "God bless Captain Vere!", which are repeated by the gathered crew in a "resonant and sympathetic echo."^{CH 26}

The novel closes with three short chapters that present ambiguity:

- Chapter 28 describes the death of Captain Vere. In a naval action against the French ship Athée (the Atheist), Captain Vere is mortally wounded. His last words are "Billy Budd, Billy Budd."
- Chapter 29 presents an extract from an official naval gazette purporting to give the facts of the fates of John Claggart and Billy Budd aboard HMS Bellipotent, but the "facts" offered turn the facts that the reader learned from the story upside down. The gazette article describes Budd as a conspiring mutineer likely of foreign birth and mysterious antecedents who is confronted by John Claggart. The master-at-arms, loyally enforcing the law, is fatally stabbed by Budd. The gazette concludes that the crime and weapon used suggest a foreign birth and subversive character; it reports that the mutineer was executed and nothing is amiss aboard HMS Bellipotent.
- Chapter 30 is a cheaply printed ballad, "Billy in the Darbies", written by one of Billy's shipmates as an elegy. The adult, experienced man represented in the poem is not the innocent youth portrayed in the preceding chapters.

== Composition history ==
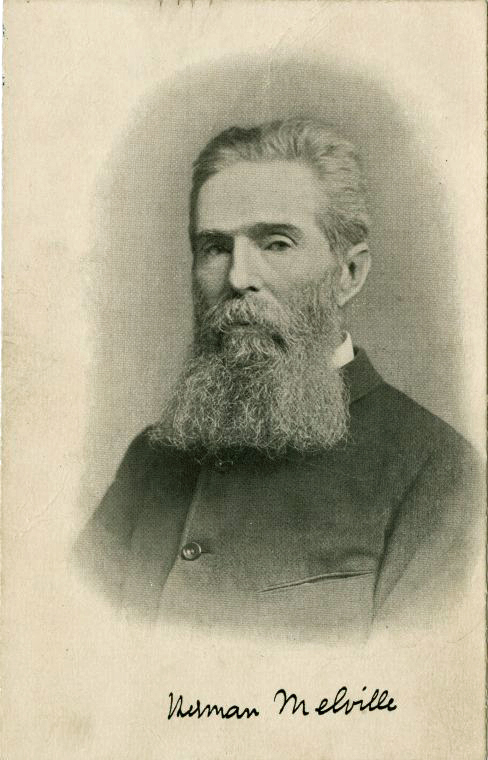
The last known image of the author, taken in 1885.

Composed fitfully over the last five years of his life, the novella Billy Budd represents Melville's return to prose fiction after three decades of only writing poetry. Melville had a difficult time writing, describing his process with Moby-Dick as follows: "And taking a book off the brain is akin to the ticklish and dangerous business of taking an old painting off a panel—you have to scrape off the whole brain in order to get at it with due safety—and even then the painting may not be worth the trouble...." The "scrapings" of Billy Budd lie in the 351 leaves of manuscript now in the Houghton Library at Harvard University.

The state of this manuscript has been described as "chaotic," with a bewildering array of corrections, cancellations, cut and pasted leaves, annotations by several hands, and with at least two different attempts made at a fair copy. The composition proceeded in three general phases, as shown by the Melville scholars Harrison Hayford and Merton M. Sealts, Jr., who did an extensive study of the original papers from 1953 to 1962. They concluded from the evidence of the paper used at each stage, the writing instruments (pencil, pen, color of ink), insertions, and crossings out that Melville introduced the three main characters in three stages of composition: first Billy, in a draft of what became "Billy in the Darbies"; then Claggart: and finally Vere.

The work started as a poem, a ballad entitled "Billy in the Darbies", which Melville intended for his book, John Marr and Other Sailors. He added a short, prose head-note to introduce the speaker and set the scene. The character of "Billy" in this early version was an older man condemned for inciting mutiny and apparently guilty as charged. He did not include the poem in his published book. Melville incorporated the ballad and expanded the head-note sketch into a story that eventually reached 150 manuscript pages. This was the first of the three major expansions, each related to one of the principal characters. As the focus of his attention shifted from one to another of these three principals, he modified the plot and thematic emphasis. Because Melville never entirely finished the revisions, critics have been divided as to where the emphasis lay and to Melville's intentions.

After Melville's death, his wife Elizabeth, who had acted as his amanuensis on other projects, scribbled notes and conjectures, corrected spelling, sorted leaves and, in some instances, wrote over her husband's faint writing. She tried to follow through on what she perceived as her husband's objectives but her editing was confusing to the first professional editors, Weaver and Freeman, who mistook her writing for Melville's. For instance, she put several pages into a folder and marked it "Preface?" indicating that she did not know what her husband had intended. At some point Elizabeth Melville placed the manuscript in "a japanned tin box" with the author's other literary materials, where it remained undiscovered for another 28 years.

== Publication history ==
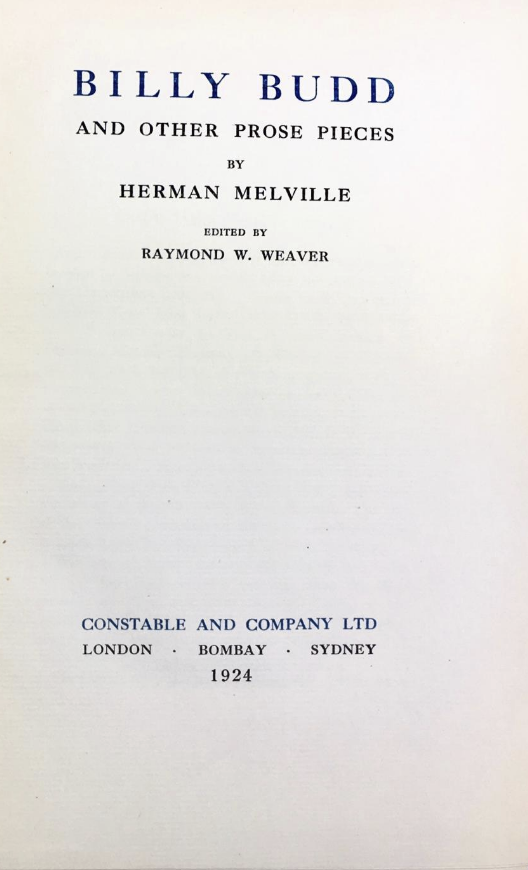
First edition title page, 1924.

In August 1918, Raymond M. Weaver, a professor at Columbia University, doing research for what would become the first biography of Melville, paid a visit to Melville's granddaughter, Eleanor Melville Metcalf, at her South Orange, New Jersey home. She gave him access to all the records of Melville that survived in the family: manuscripts, letters, journals, annotated books, photographs, and a variety of other material. Among these papers, Weaver was astonished to find a substantial manuscript for an unknown prose work entitled Billy Budd.

After producing a text that would later be described as "hastily transcribed", he published the first edition of the work in 1924 as Billy Budd, Foretopman in Volume XIII of the Standard Edition of Melville's Complete Works (London: Constable and Company). In 1928 he published another version of the text that, despite numerous variations, may be considered essentially the same text.

F. Barron Freeman published a second text in 1948, edited on different principles, as Melville's Billy Budd (Cambridge: Harvard University Press). He believed he stayed closer to what Melville wrote, but still relied on Weaver's text, with what are now considered mistaken assumptions and textual errors. Subsequent editions of Billy Budd up through the early 1960s are, strictly speaking, versions of one or the other of these two basic texts.

After several years of study, in 1962, Harrison Hayford and Merton M. Sealts, Jr., established what is now considered the correct, authoritative text. It was published by the University of Chicago Press, and contains both a "reading" and a "genetic" text. Most editions printed since then follow the Hayford-Sealts text. In 2017, however, the Northwestern University Press and the Newberry Library published Billy Budd, Sailor and Other Uncompleted Writings. The Northwestern-Newberry Edition, as it is known, "differs from the one offered by Hayford and Sealts".

Based on the confusing manuscripts, the published versions had many variations. For example, early versions gave the book's title as Billy Budd, Foretopman, while it now seems clear Melville intended Billy Budd, Sailor (An Inside Narrative); some versions wrongly included as a preface a chapter that Melville had excised (the correct text has no preface). In addition, some early versions did not follow his change of the name of the ship to Bellipotent (from the Latin bellum 'war' and potens 'powerful'), from Indomitable, as Melville called it in an earlier draft. His full intentions in changing the name of the ship are unclear, since he used the name Bellipotent only six times.

== Literary significance and reception ==
The book has undergone a number of substantial critical reevaluations in the years since its discovery. Raymond Weaver, its first editor, was initially unimpressed and described it as "not distinguished". After its publication debut in England, and with critics of such caliber as D. H. Lawrence and John Middleton Murry hailing it as a masterpiece, Weaver changed his mind. In the introduction to its second edition in the 1928 Shorter Novels of Herman Melville, he declared: "In Pierre, Melville had hurled himself into a fury of vituperation against the world; with Billy Budd he would justify the ways of God to man." German novelist Thomas Mann declared that Billy Budd was "one of the most beautiful stories in the world" and that it "made his heart wide open"; he declared that he wished he had written the scene of Billy's dying.

In mid-1924 Murry orchestrated the reception of Billy Budd, Foretopman, first in London, in the influential Times Literary Supplement, in an essay called "Herman Melville's Silence" (July 10, 1924), then in a reprinting of the essay, slightly expanded, in The New York Times Book Review (August 10, 1924). In relatively short order he and several other influential British literati had managed to canonize Billy Budd, placing it alongside Moby-Dick as one of the great books of Western literature. Wholly unknown to the public until 1924, Billy Budd by 1926 had joint billing with the book that had just recently been firmly established as a literary masterpiece. In its first text and subsequent texts, and as read by different audiences, the book has kept that high status ever since.

In 1990 the Melville biographer and scholar Hershel Parker pointed out that all the early estimations of Billy Budd were based on readings from the flawed transcription texts of Weaver. Some of these flaws were crucial to an understanding of Melville's intent, such as the famous "coda" at the end of the chapter containing the news account of the death of the "admirable" John Claggart and the "depraved" William Budd (25 in Weaver, 29 in Hayford & Sealts reading text, 344Ba in the genetic text) :

Weaver: "Here ends a story not unwarranted by what happens in this incongruous world of ours—innocence and 'infirmary', spiritual depravity and fair 'respite'."

The Ms: "Here ends a story not unwarranted by what happens in this {word undeciphered} world of ours—innocence and 'infamy', spiritual depravity and fair 'repute'."

Melville had written this as an endnote after his second major revision. When he enlarged the book with the third major section, developing Captain Vere, he deleted the endnote, as it no longer applied to the expanded story. Many of the early readers, such as Murry and Freeman, thought this passage was a foundational statement of Melville's philosophical views on life. Parker wonders what they could possibly have understood from the passage as printed.

== Analysis and interpretations ==
There appear to be three principal conceptions of the meaning of Melville's Billy Budd: the first, and most heavily supported, that it is Melville's "Testament of acceptance," his valedictory and his final benediction. The second view, a reaction against the first, holds that Billy Budd is ironic, and that its real import is precisely the opposite of its ostensible meaning. Still a third interpretation denies that interpretation is possible; a work of art has no meaning at all that can be abstracted from it, nor is a man's work in any way an index of his character or his opinion. All three of these views of Billy Budd are in their own sense true.

— R. H. Fogle

Hershel Parker agrees that "masterpiece" is an appropriate description of the book, but he adds a proviso.

[E]xamining the history and reputation of Billy Budd has left me more convinced than before that it deserves high stature (although not precisely the high stature it holds, whatever that stature is) and more convinced that it is a wonderfully teachable story—as long as it is not taught as a finished, complete, coherent, and totally interpretable work of art.

Given this unfinished quality and Melville's reluctance to present clear lessons, the range of critical response is not surprising. A wide range of views by about twenty-five different authors, including Raymond Weaver, Lewis Mumford, Newton Arvin, and W.H. Auden, are published in Melville's Billy Budd and the Critics.

Some critics have interpreted Billy Budd as a historical novel that attempts to evaluate man's relation to the past. Thomas J. Scorza has written about the philosophical framework of the story. He understands the work as a comment on the historical feud between poets and philosophers. By this interpretation, Melville is opposing the scientific, rational systems of thought, which Claggart's character represents, in favor of the more comprehensive poetic pursuit of knowledge embodied by Billy.

The centrality of Billy Budd's extraordinary good looks in the novella, where he is described by Captain Vere as "the young fellow who seems so popular with the men—Billy, the Handsome Sailor," have led to interpretations of a homoerotic sensibility in the novel.

In her bestseller Sexual Personae: Art and Decadence from Nefertiti to Emily Dickinson (1990), Camille Paglia likens Billy Budd to the ritually slain Adonis and Jesus Christ: "Like Christ, Billy Budd poses an internal threat to an empire at war."

In her book Epistemology of the Closet (1990/2008), Eve Sedgwick, expanding on earlier interpretations of the same themes, posits that the interrelationships between Billy, Claggart and Captain Vere are representations of male homosexual desire and the mechanisms of prohibition against this desire. She points out that Claggart's "natural depravity," which is defined tautologically as "depravity according to nature," and the accumulation of equivocal terms ("phenomenal", "mystery", etc.) used in the explanation of the fault in his character, are an indication of his status as the central homosexual figure in the text. She also interprets the mutiny scare aboard the Bellipotent, the political circumstances that are at the center of the events of the story, as a portrayal of homophobia.

Melville's dramatic presentation of the contradiction between the requirements of the law and the needs of humanity made the novella an iconic text in the field of law and literature. Earlier readers viewed Captain Vere as good man trapped by bad law. Richard Weisberg, who holds degrees in both comparative literature and law, argued that Vere was wrong to play the roles of witness, prosecutor, judge, and executioner, and that he went beyond the law when he sentenced Billy to immediate hanging. Based on his study of statutory law and practices in the Royal Navy in the era in which the book takes place, Weisberg argues that Vere deliberately distorted the applicable substantive and procedural law to bring about Billy's death. Judge Richard Posner has sharply criticized these claims. He objects to ascribing literary significance to legal errors that are not part of the imagined world of Melville's fiction and accused Weisberg and others of calling Billy an "innocent man" and making light of the fact that he "struck a lethal blow to a superior officer in wartime." The first issue of Cardozo Studies in Law and Literature is devoted to Billy Budd and includes essays by Weisberg and Posner.

H. Bruce Franklin sees a direct connection between the hanging of Budd and the controversy around capital punishment. While Melville was writing Billy Budd between 1886 and 1891, the public's attention was focused on the issue. Other commentators have suggested that the story may have been based on events on board USS Somers, an American naval vessel; Lt. Guert Gansevoort, a defendant in a later investigation, was a first cousin of Melville. If so then the character Billy Budd was likely inspired by a young man named Philip Spencer who was hanged on USS Somers on December 1, 1842.

Harold Schechter, a professor who has written books on American serial killers, has said that the author's description of Claggart could be considered to be a definition of a sociopath. He acknowledges that Melville was writing at a time before the word "sociopath" was used.

=== In law and literature ===
Since the late 20th century, Billy Budd has become a central text in the field of legal scholarship known as law and literature. The climactic trial has been the focus of scholarly inquiry regarding the motives of Vere and the legal necessity of Billy's condemnation. Vere states, given the circumstances of Claggart's slaying, condemning Billy to death would be unjust. While critics have viewed Vere as a character caught between the pressures between unbending legalism and malleable moral principles, other critics have differed in opinion. Such other critics have argued that Vere represents a ressentient protagonist whose disdain for Lord Admiral Nelson he takes out on Billy, in whom Vere sees the traits of Nelson's that he resents. One scholar argues that Vere manipulated and misrepresented the applicable laws to condemn Billy, showing that the laws of the time did not require a sentence of death and that legally any such sentence required review before being carried out. While this argument has been criticized for drawing on information outside the novel, Weisberg also shows that sufficient liberties existed in the laws Melville describes to avoid a capital sentence.

Darryl Ponicsan's 1970 novel The Last Detail involves a Navy enlisted man protagonist, Billy Buddusky, a homage to Melville. Buddusky dies in a brawl with the Shore Patrol. The book was later made into a 1973 film by Hal Ashby. The film omits the original ending by Ponicsan.

== Adaptations in other media ==
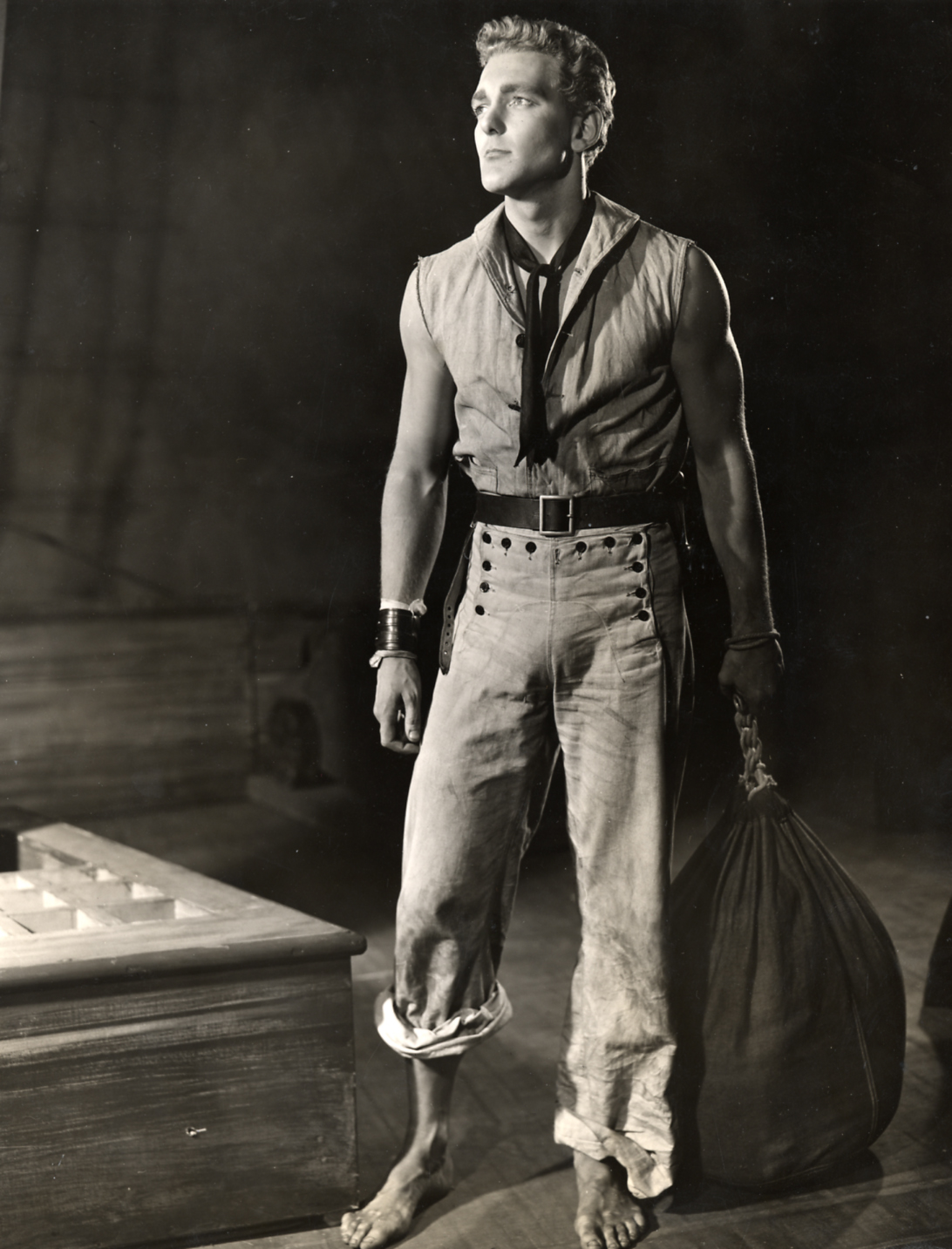
Charles Nolte as Billy Budd in the 1951 Broadway production

=== Theater and opera ===
- In 1951, Louis O. Coxe and Robert Chapman's 1949 stage adaptation, Billy Budd, opened on Broadway, winning both the Donaldson Awards and Outer Critics Circle Awards for best play.
- The best-known adaptation is the opera Billy Budd, with a score by Benjamin Britten and a libretto by E. M. Forster and Eric Crozier. The opera follows the earlier text of 1924, and was premiered in December 1951 in a four-act version. Britten, Forster and Crozier subsequently revised the opera into a two-act version, which was first performed in January 1964. Scholar Hanna Rochlitz has studied this adaptation in detail. A volume in the Cambridge Opera Handbooks series is dedicated to the opera.
- Giorgio Ghedini composed an Italian-language opera adapted from the novella. Its libretto by Salvatore Quasimodo was based on the 1942 Italian translation by Eugenio Montale. This opera was premiered in 1949 but has not been as widely performed as Britten's work.

=== Film ===
- Peter Ustinov produced and directed the 1962 film Billy Budd, adapting its script from Coxe and Chapman's 1951 Broadway production (above). The black-and-white film costars a young Terence Stamp as the title character, Ustinov as Captain Vere, Robert Ryan as Master d'Arms Claggart, and Melvyn Douglas as "The Dansker". Actors David McCallum, Paul Rogers, and John Neville are also featured in the film as officers aboard HMS Avenger.
- Claire Denis' Beau Travail (1999), set in Djibouti, is loosely based on the novel. In the 2022 Sight and Sound decennial poll of film critics and directors to determine current thinking on which films are the best of all time, Beau Travail was one of the new entries into the top ten, placing seventh.

=== Music ===
- "Billy Budd" is a song on the 1994 album Vauxhall and I by English indie artist Morrissey.

=== Television ===
- General Motors Theatre presented a live telecast of Billy Budd in 1955, starring a young William Shatner as Billy Budd, with Douglas Campbell as Claggart and Basil Rathbone as Captain Vere. Britten's "Four Sea Interludes" was included as background music.
- Two different productions based on the Britten opera were broadcast in 1988 and 1998.

=== Radio ===
- In 2002, Focus on the Family adapted "Billy Budd, Sailor" as an audio drama for its Radio Theater program. Edward Woodward played Captain Vere.

=== Audiobook ===
- In 2025, the Berkshire County Historical Society, which owns and preserves Herman Melville's home, Arrowhead, published an audiobook version of Billy Budd, Sailor narrated by actor Paul Giamatti.
- In 2018 the actor and audiobook narrator Liam Gerrard narrated an audiobook version of Billy Budd, Sailor for Enriched Classics.
