= Louis O. Coxe =

American poet (1918–1993)

- Born: April 15, 1918; Manchester, New Hampshire, U.S.
- Died: May 25, 1993 (age 75); Augusta, Maine, U.S.
- Education: St. Paul's School; Princeton University
- Occupations: Author; poet; professor; playwright
- Spouse: Edith Winsor

Louis Osborne Coxe (April 15, 1918 – May 25, 1993) was an American poet, playwright, essayist, and professor who was recognized by the Academy of American Poets for his "long, powerful, quiet accomplishment, largely unrecognized, in lyric poetry." He was probably best known for his dramatic adaptation of Herman Melville's Billy Budd, which opened on Broadway in 1951.

== Early life and education ==
Born in Manchester, New Hampshire in 1918 but raised in Salem, Massachusetts (where his family had lived since 1640), Coxe was educated at St. Paul's School. He graduated from Princeton University in 1940, writing his senior thesis on Edwin Arlington Robinson.

== Career ==
During World War II, Coxe served in the United States Navy, commanding the U.S.S. PC-549 in the South Pacific Theater during the Northern Solomon Islands campaign and the invasion of Guam and invasion of Saipan-Tinian (and later the U.S.S. PC-1195), an experience that would shape much of his poetry. After leaving active service in 1946, he married Edith Winsor, granddaughter of Boston financier Robert Winsor, and began teaching at Princeton. He was Briggs-Copeland Fellow at Harvard University from 1948 to 1949, and from 1949 to 1955, he taught at the University of Minnesota. Coxe then moved to Bowdoin College in Brunswick, Maine in 1956, where he remained (except for brief appointments at Princeton, Trinity College, Dublin, Ireland, and the University of Aix-Marseilles, France) as head of the English department until his death in 1993 after 11 years suffering from Alzheimer's disease.

== Recognition ==
Coxe received his largest critical recognition for his dramatic adaptation, with Robert Chapman, of Herman Melville's morality tale Billy Budd, which opened to critical acclaim on Broadway in 1951, winning both the Donaldson Awards and the Outer Critics Circle Award for best play. The New York Times' Brooks Atkinson called it "extraordinarily well done," and said that "the tragic portions are written with taste, firmness and intelligence." Coxe was also credited with co-writing the screenplay for Peter Ustinov's film version of the play. He wrote several other plays, most for local productions in Maine, one of which, "Decoration Day" (about Civil War general Joshua Lawrence Chamberlain), was published as a book along with his long narrative poem "Nikal Seyn." He was also praised for his criticism, writing books on both Chaucer and Edwin Arlington Robinson.

But Coxe's main focus was his poetry, which U.S. Poet Laureate Howard Nemerov called "terse, cryptic, almost savage in their beauty." Much of his work focused on his experience during World War II and the natural environment of his native New England. Several of his poems, reviews and essays appeared first in The New Yorker, The New Republic, Paris Review, and Atlantic Monthly. In 1972 the Maine State Commission on the Arts and Humanities presented him with a Maine State Award for his significant contributions to the cultural life of Maine. He was named the 36th fellow of the Academy of American Poets in 1977 and was awarded a creative writing grant from the National Endowment for the Arts that same year. One of the last poems he published, "Nightsong" (1983), was featured in the anthology Fifty Years of American Poetry.

== Bibliography ==
=== Poetry ===
- The Sea Faring and Other Poems (1947)
- The Second Man and Other Poems (1955)
- The Wilderness and Other Poems (1958)
- The Middle Passage (1960)
- The Last Hero and Other Poems (1965)
- Nikal Seyn & Decoration Day: A Poem and a Play (1966)
- Passage: Selected Poems 1943–1978 (1979)
- The North Well (1985)

=== Plays ===
- Billy Budd (1949)
- Nikal Seyn & Decoration Day: A Poem and a Play (1966)
- Birth of a State

=== Criticism ===
- Chaucer, part of the Laurel Poetry Series (editor, along with introduction and notes) (1963)
- Edwin Arlington Robinson; The Life of Poetry (1969)
- Enabling Acts: Selected Essays in Criticism (1976)

== Awards ==
- Donaldson Awards Best Play, 1951
- Outer Critics Circle Award Best Play, 1951
- Maine State Award, 1972
- National Endowment for the Arts creative writing grant, 1977
- Academy of American Poets Fellowship, 1977
