= The Vagabond King (1956 film) =

- Film poster
- Directed by: Michael Curtiz
- Written by: Ken Englund; Brian Hooker (book of stage musical); Noel Langley
- Produced by: Pat Duggan
- Starring: Kathryn Grayson; Oreste Kirkop; Rita Moreno; Sir Cedric Hardwicke; Walter Hampden; Leslie Nielsen
- Cinematography: Robert Burks
- Edited by: Arthur P. Schmidt
- Music by: Rudolf Friml (Operetta); Johnny Burke; Brian Hooker
- Production company: Paramount Pictures
- Distributed by: Paramount Pictures
- Release date: August 29, 1956
- Running time: 86 minutes
- Country: United States
- Language: English
- Box office: $1.4 million (US)

The Vagabond King is a 1956 American musical film directed by Michael Curtiz and starring Kathryn Grayson, Rita Moreno, Sir Cedric Hardwicke, Walter Hampden, Leslie Nielsen, and Maltese singer Oreste Kirkop in his only feature film role. It was produced and distributed by Paramount Pictures. It is an adaptation of the 1925 operetta The Vagabond King by Rudolf Friml. Hampden plays King Louis XI. Mary Grant designed the film's costumes.

== Plot ==
In fifteenth-century France, King Louis XI (Walter Hampden) is besieged in Paris by Charles, Duke of Burgundy, and his allies. Even within the city, Louis' reign is disputed. The irreverent, persuasive beggar poet François Villon (tenor Oreste Kirkop) commands the loyalty of the commoners.

Louis goes in disguise to a tavern to see what sort of a man this poet is. Villon reveals he has no love for the king. Afterward, Louis sees Thibault, his provost marshal, meeting in that very place with Rene, an agent of the Duke of Burgundy. Thibault shows Rene a list of those in Paris who are prepared to overthrow Louis. However, Villon, who has a grudge against Thibault, engages his enemy in a sword fight, during which the incriminating document falls on the floor and is picked up by Louis. The duel is stopped by the city guard. Louis reveals himself and has Villon and his companions thrown into the dungeon. Thibault, however, gets away.

Later, Villon is brought to the king in his unusual garden; the trees bear the bodies of hanged traitors. Louis proposes to let him live, as the new provost marshal, until the Duke of Burgundy is driven away. When Villon turns him down, the king sweetens his offer by including time with Catherine de Vaucelles (Kathryn Grayson), a beautiful noblewoman Villon has fallen in love with, and the lives of his friends. Villon accepts, and is introduced to Catherine as "Count François de Montcorbier" from Savoy. Rumor reaches her through her maid, Margaret, that she is to marry the count. She is puzzled at first, then becomes furious when she realizes who her betrothed really is. When she berates Villon for playing a horrible joke on her. He cannot convince her that his love is sincere, while she cannot persuade him that the king is a great man.

Later, Louis' military commander, Antoine de Chabannes, conducts Villon to the dungeon, where he claims the leader of the secret traitors is being held. The turncoat turns out to be de Chabannes himself. Villon is captured, but then rescued when Louis is warned in time by Huguette, who loves Villon. Huguette also warns them that Jehan, a Burgundian agent, is rousing the rabble against Louis in Villon's name. Villon uses the Duke of Burgundy's own scheme against him. When traitors open the city gates to the enemy army, they march in, only to have the gates shut behind them, trapping them inside to be overwhelmed by the commoners under the leadership of Villon. In the fighting, Huguette is killed when she jumps in front of Villon to save him from an archer's arrow. Villon kills both the Duke of Burgundy and Thibault.

Afterward, Villon willingly goes to the gallows to be hanged to fulfill the bargain he made. When the mob becomes outraged, Louis offers to spare Villon if someone will take his place. At the last moment, Catherine offers herself. Then Louis cites a law that spares any man who weds a noblewoman and sets Villon free, confiscating Catherine's wealth to pay for the costs of the war.

== Cast ==
- Kathryn Grayson as Catherine de Vaucelles
- Oreste Kirkop as François Villon
- Rita Moreno as Huguette
- Sir Cedric Hardwicke as Tristan L'Hermite
- Walter Hampden as King Louis XI
- Leslie Nielsen as Thibault
- William Prince as Rene
- Jack Lord as Ferrebouc
- Billy Vine as Jacques
- Gregory Morton as General Antoine de Chabannes
- Vincent Price as the narrator
- Phyllis Newman as Lulu (uncredited)

== Music ==
Music composed by Rudolf Friml, lyrics by Johnny Burke unless otherwise indicated.

- "Bon Jour" - Sung by Oreste Kirkop
- "Vive La You" - Performed by Rita Moreno (dubbed by Eve Boswell) and Vagabonds
- "Some Day" - lyrics by Brian Hooker - Sung by Kathryn Grayson
- "Comparisons" - Sung by Kirkop and Vagabonds
- "Huguette Waltz" - lyrics by Brian Hooker, Sung by Rita Moreno (dubbed by Eve Boswell)
- "Only A Rose" - lyrics by Brian Hooker, presented by Kirkop and Grayson
- "This Same Heart" - sung by Kirkop
- "Watch Out For The Devil" - sung by Kirkop, Grayson and chorus,

danced by ballet dancers at the King's Court

- "Song of the Vagabonds" - from the original operetta, performed by Kirkop, Moreno and Vagabonds

== See also ==
- List of American films of 1956
- The Vagabond King (1930 film)
- The Beloved Rogue, 1927 film
- If I Were King, 1938 film
- Jack Lord filmography
