= If I Were King =

1938 film by Frank Lloyd

- 1938 US theatrical poster
- Directed by: Frank Lloyd
- Written by: Preston Sturges
- Based on: If I Were King; 1901 novel and play by Justin Huntly McCarthy
- Produced by: Frank Lloyd
- Starring: Ronald Colman; Basil Rathbone; Frances Dee
- Cinematography: Theodor Sparkuhl
- Edited by: Hugh Bennett
- Music by: Richard Hageman; Milan Roder (uncredited)
- Distributed by: Paramount Pictures
- Release date: November 11, 1938
- Running time: 101 minutes
- Country: United States
- Language: English
- Budget: over $1 million

If I Were King is a 1938 American biographical and historical film starring Ronald Colman as medieval poet François Villon, and featuring Basil Rathbone and Frances Dee. It is based on the 1901 play and novel, both of the same name, by Justin Huntly McCarthy, and was directed by Frank Lloyd, with a screenplay adaptation by Preston Sturges.

== Plot ==
In Paris, which has long been besieged by the Burgundians, François Villon is the despair of Father Villon, the priest who took him in and raised him from the age of six. Father Villon takes François to mass after his latest escapade (robbing a royal storehouse). There François spies a beautiful woman, Katherine DeVaucelles. Entranced, he tries to strike up an acquaintance, reciting one of his poems (from which the film takes its title) and pretending it was written specially for her. On the surface, she is unmoved, but when soldiers come to take him into custody, she provides him with an alibi.

The crafty King Louis XI is in desperate straits and suspects that there is a traitor in his court. He goes in disguise to a tavern to see who accepts an intercepted coded message from the enemy. While there, he is amused by the antics of Villon. The rascal criticizes the king and brags about how much better he would do if he were in Louis' place. When the watch arrives to arrest Villon, a riot breaks out and Villon kills Grand Constable D'Aussigny in the brawl. But when D'Aussigny is revealed as the turncoat, the King is in two minds about what to do with Villon. As a jest, Louis rewards the poet by making him the new Constable, pretending that since nobles have failed in that role, perhaps one of the commoners whom Villon champions can do better.

Villon has fallen in love with Katherine, who is lady-in-waiting on the queen, and she with him, not recognizing him as Villon. Then Louis informs Villon that he intends to have him executed after a week. François soon finds how difficult it is to make the army attack the besieging forces, so, acting on an idea of Katherine's, he has the King's storehouses release the army's last six months of food to the starving population of Paris—giving the army the same short schedule for attack as the people.

Villon is watched constantly and cannot escape the palace, but when the Burgundians break down the city gates, he escapes to rally the common people to rout them and the defeated enemy then lift the siege. Not knowing the part he has played, Louis has Villon arrested again. It is only when Katherine and Father Villon testify on his behalf that the King realizes what he owes François and goes personally to liberate him.

He and Villon now have some grudging respect for each other, and Villon admits to the King that Louis' job is harder than he once thought. The King on his side now feels obligated to reward Villon again. But wanting less aggravation in his life, Louis decides to pardon Villon only by exiling him from Paris. François leaves on foot, headed for the south of France, but Katherine squeezes this information from Father Villon and follows in her carriage at a discreet distance on the road, waiting for François to tire out.

== Cast ==
- Ronald Colman as François Villon
- Basil Rathbone as King Louis XI
- Frances Dee as Katherine DeVaucelles
- Ellen Drew as Huguette, Villon's girlfriend
- C. V. France as Father Villon
- Henry Wilcoxon as Captain of the Watch
- Heather Thatcher as the Queen
- Stanley Ridges as Rene de Montigny
- Bruce Lester as Noel de Jolys
- Alma Lloyd as Colette
- Walter Kingsford as Tristan l'Hermite
- Sidney Toler as Robin Turgis
- Colin Tapley as Jehan Le Loup
- Ralph Forbes as Oliver le Dain
- John Miljan as Grand Constable Thibaut D'Aussigny
- William Haade as Guy Tabarie
- Adrian Morris as Colin de Cayeulx
- Montagu Love as General Dudon
- Lester Matthews as General Saliere
- William Farnum, as General Barbezier
- Paul Harvey as Burgundian Herald
- Barry Macollum as Storehouse Watchman
- May Beatty as Anna
- Winter Hall as Major Domo
- Francis McDonald as Casin Cholet
- Ann Evers as Lady-in-Waiting
- Jean Fenwick as Lady-in-Waiting

== Production ==
Henry Wilcoxon, Colin Tapley, and C.V. France in If I Were King

Nine months in France were required to prepare for If I Were King, and the French government cooperated by allowing a replica to be made of the Louvre Palace throne.

Whether Preston Sturges, who at the time was Paramount's top writer, had a collaborator in writing the script is unclear: some early drafts have the name "Jackson" on them as well as Sturges', but the identity of "Jackson" has not been determined. In any event, Sturges finished a draft by February 1938. The final screenplay included Sturges' own original translations of some of Villon's poems.

The film was in production from 12 May to mid-July 1938. Ralph Faulkner, who played a watchman, acted as stunt coordinator and coached the actors on swordplay, and about 900 extras were used for the battle scenes, one of which was cut by the director after the film had opened.

== Accolades ==
If I Were King was nominated for four Academy Awards:

- Supporting Actor - Basil Rathbone
- Art Direction - Hans Dreier and John B. Goodman
- Music, Original Score - Richard Hageman
- Sound, Recording - Loren L. Ryder

== Other versions ==
There is no connection, apart from the title, between the story and the 1852 comic opera by Adolphe Adam called Si j'étais roi (English: If I Were King).

McCarthy's play premiered on Broadway in 1901 and was revived five times up through 1916. It was first adapted in 1920 as a silent film.

In 1925, composer Rudolf Friml and librettists Brian Hooker and W.H. Post turned it into a successful Broadway operetta, The Vagabond King, which featured the songs "Only a Rose", "Some Day", and "Song of the Vagabonds". The operetta was filmed twice - in 1930, starring Jeanette MacDonald and Dennis King and in 1956, directed by Michael Curtiz. Both film versions used very little of Friml's original score.

The François Villon story was also filmed in 1927 under the title The Beloved Rogue, with John Barrymore in the lead role.

The film was adapted as a radio play on Lux Radio Theater October 16, 1939 with Douglas Fairbanks Jr. Academy Award Theater adapted it on May 11, 1946, with Colman reprising his part.
