= The Beloved Rogue =

1927 film by Alan Crosland

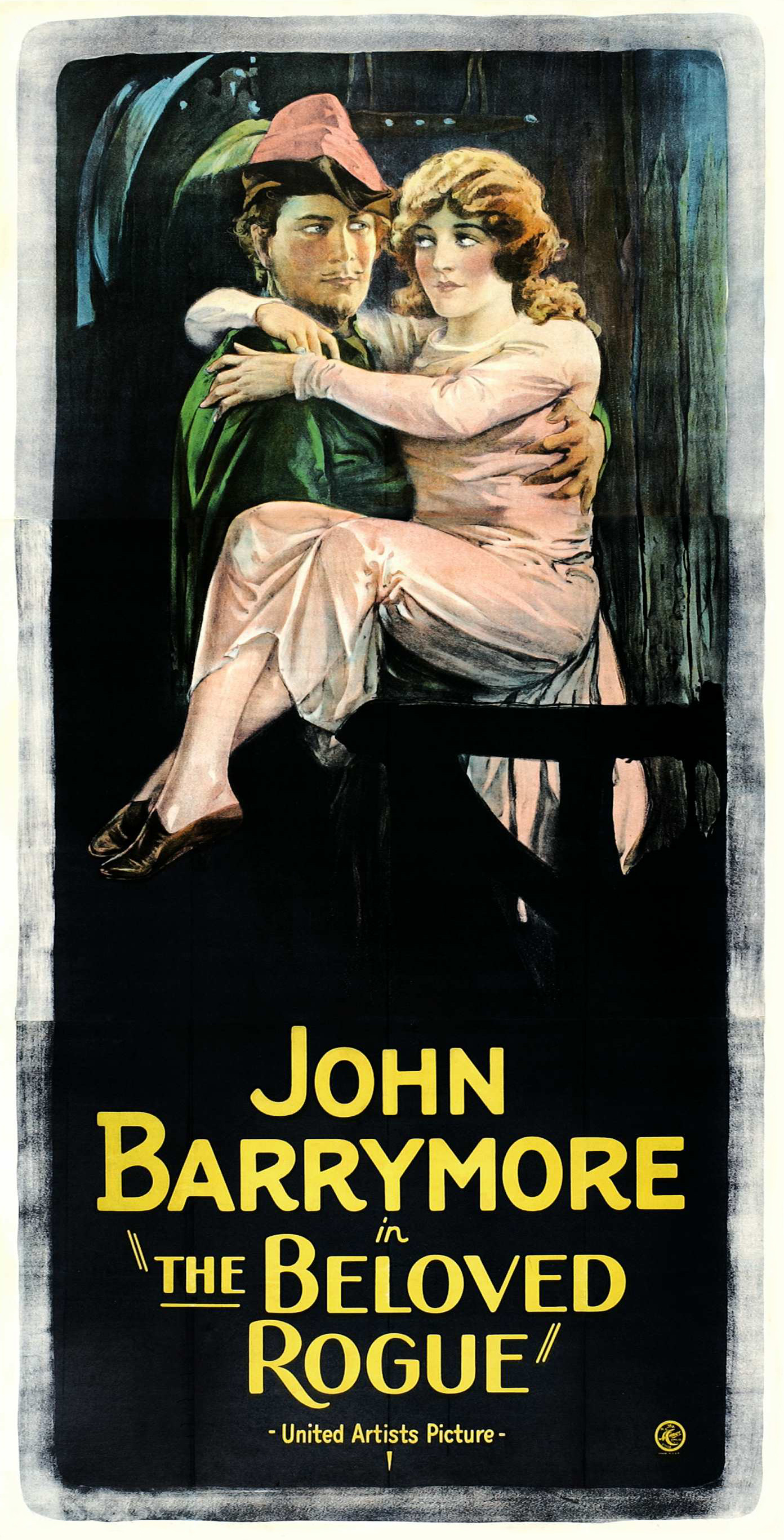
- Original theatrical poster
- Directed by: Alan Crosland
- Written by: Paul Bern (adaptation & scenario); Walter Anthony (intertitles)
- Based on: If I Were King; 1901 novel and play by Justin Huntly McCarthy
- Produced by: Joseph M. Schenck
- Starring: John Barrymore
- Cinematography: Joseph H. August
- Edited by: Hal C. Kern
- Production companies: Art Cinema Corporation / Feature Productions
- Distributed by: United Artists
- Release date: March 12, 1927
- Running time: 10 reels (9,264 ft)
- Country: United States
- Language: Silent (English intertitles)

The Beloved Rogue is a 1927 American silent romantic adventure film, loosely based on the life of the 15th century French poet, François Villon. The film was directed by Alan Crosland for United Artists.

François Villon is played by John Barrymore, and other cast members include Conrad Veidt as King Louis XI and Marceline Day as Charlotte de Vauxcelles.

The story had been filmed in 1920 as If I Were King with William Farnum. The film was later re-made in the sound era again reverting to its original title If I Were King (1938) with Ronald Colman, and as an operetta in The Vagabond King (1930), and again in 1956.

== Plot ==
The Beloved Rogue (1927)

François Villon is a poet and avid patriot whose father was burned at the stake. François is particularly committed to helping the oppressed and the weak. The Duke of Burgundy is out for the French throne. With cunning and deceit he tries to deceive the superstitious king, who is warned by his astrologers about a war with Burgundy. So the king also gives in to the demand that his ward Charlotte marry the Burgundian Count Thibault d'Aussigny.

On "All Fools' Day" François is elected King of Fools by the population. During the festivities, the Duke of Burgundy encounters the rabble and wants to end the celebration. François Villon recognizes the Duke and demands that the crowd remove him from his horse. The melee is interrupted by the arrival of King Louis and his entourage. The King, fearing an affront to the duke, banishes François from Paris. Soon thereafter, while Villon endures his banishment at a hostel outside of Paris, a wagon filled with food, which the Duke has sent to the King, stops outside of the hostel. Villon's desire to ridicule the King gets the better of him, and with his two loyal friends, Little Jehan and Nicholas, they steal the wagon in order to send the food to the people instead of the king. Climbing the treacherous walls of the city, they use the King's catapult to shuttle the food into town to care for the poor.

François is accidentally catapulted into the city. He ends up literally flying head first into the room of Charlotte de Vauxcelles. She and Count Thibault d'Aussigny have been forced to take refuge at an inn during a snow storm when Charlotte's sleigh breaks down. Entering the room to interrupt Charlotte's and Villon's encounter, the count pursues the surprised poet. A comical battle ensues in which François defeats Thibault. Charlotte decides to run away with the poet. But François is captured and Charlotte surrenders to her fate.

François is brought to Burgundy, tortured and, as a special wedding surprise, locked in a cage. The throng of beggars and thieves free François and Charlotte, who now want to get married.

== Cast ==
- John Barrymore as François Villon
- Conrad Veidt as King Louis XI
- Hans Conried as King Louis XI's son
- Marceline Day as Charlotte de Vauxcelles
- W. Lawson Butt as Duke of Burgundy
- Henry Victor as Thibault d'Aussigny
- Slim Summerville as Jehan
- Mack Swain as Nicholas
- Angelo Rossitto as Beppo the Dwarf
- Nigel De Brulier as Astrologer
- Lucy Beaumont as Villon's mother
- Otto Matieson as Olivier (credited as Otto Mattiesen)
- Jane Winton as The Abbess
- Rose Dione as Margot
- Bertram Grassby as Duke of Orleans
- Dick Sutherland as Tristan l'Hermite
- Martha Franklin as Maid (uncredited)
- Stubby Kruger as Torturer (uncredited)
- Dickie Moore as Baby Francois (uncredited)
- Bob Reeves as Guard (uncredited)

Cast member Dick Sutherland, like Rondo Hatton a couple of decades later, suffered from acromegaly.

== Production ==
According to "Hazard of the Game", an episode of the Thames documentary Hollywood, Paul Malvern, John Barrymore's stunt double, insisted on extensively testing a stunt involving a catapult and a net with sandbags before performing it himself, because he had doubts about the initial mathematics used for coordinating the stunt.

== Reception ==
John Barrymore viewed the premiere of the film with a large picture palace audience. Unknown to the audience, he was standing at the back of the movie house. Barrymore apparently was discontented or bemused or perhaps being self-effacingly charming regarding his own performance, stating "what a ham".

== Preservation ==
The only surviving domestic print of The Beloved Rogue was found in John Barrymore's former mansion by its subsequent occupant, Edgar Bergen, who donated it to the American Film Institute. It was subsequently preserved by the Library of Congress.
