= François Villon =

15th-century French poet and criminal

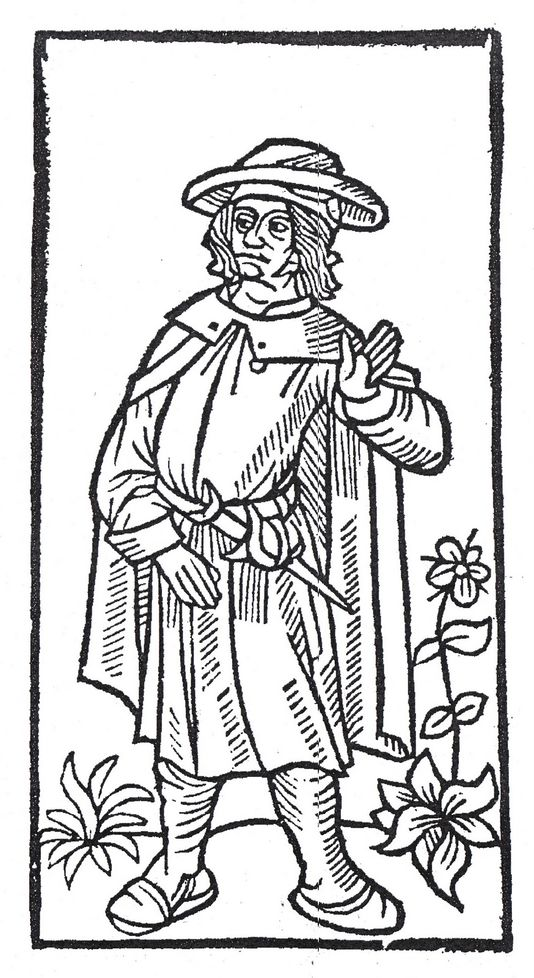
- Stock woodcut image, used to represent François Villon in the 1489 printing of the Grand Testament de Maistre François Villon
- Born: François de Montcorbier or François des Loges c. 1431; Paris, France
- Died: after 1463 (aged 31–32)
- Education: University of Paris
- Occupations: Poet, thief
- Writing career
- Language: Middle French
- Notable works: Le Testament, "Ballade des pendus"

François Villon (/viːˈjɒn/; Modern French: [fʁɑ̃swa vijɔ̃]; Middle French: [frãːˈswɛ viˈlõː]; c. 1431 – after 1463) is the best known French poet of the Late Middle Ages. He was involved in criminal behavior and had multiple encounters with law enforcement authorities. Villon wrote about some of these experiences in his poems.

== Biography ==
=== Birth ===
Villon was born in Paris in 1431. One source gives the date as 19 April, 1432 [O.S. April 1, 1431].

=== Early life ===
Villon's real name may have been François de Montcorbier or François des Loges: both of these names appear in official documents drawn up in Villon's lifetime. In his own work, however, Villon is the only name the poet used, and he mentions it frequently in his work. His two collections of poems, especially "Le Testament" (also known as "Le grand testament"), have traditionally been read as if they were autobiographical. Other details of his life are known from court or other civil documents.

From what the sources tell us, it appears that Villon was born in poverty and raised by a foster father, but that his mother was still living when her son was thirty years old. The surname "Villon," the poet tells us, is the name he adopted from his foster father, Guillaume de Villon, chaplain in the collegiate church of Saint-Benoît-le-Bétourné and a professor of canon law, who took Villon into his house. François describes Guillaume de Villon as "more than a father to me".

=== Student life ===
Villon became a student in arts, perhaps at about twelve years of age. He received a bachelor's degree from the University of Paris in 1449 and a master's degree in 1452. Between this year and 1455, nothing is known of his activities. The Encyclopædia Britannica Eleventh Edition (1910–1911) says "Attempts have been made, in the usual fashion of conjectural biography, to fill up the gap with what a young graduate of Bohemian tendencies would, could, or might have done, but they are mainly futile."

=== Alleged criminal activities ===
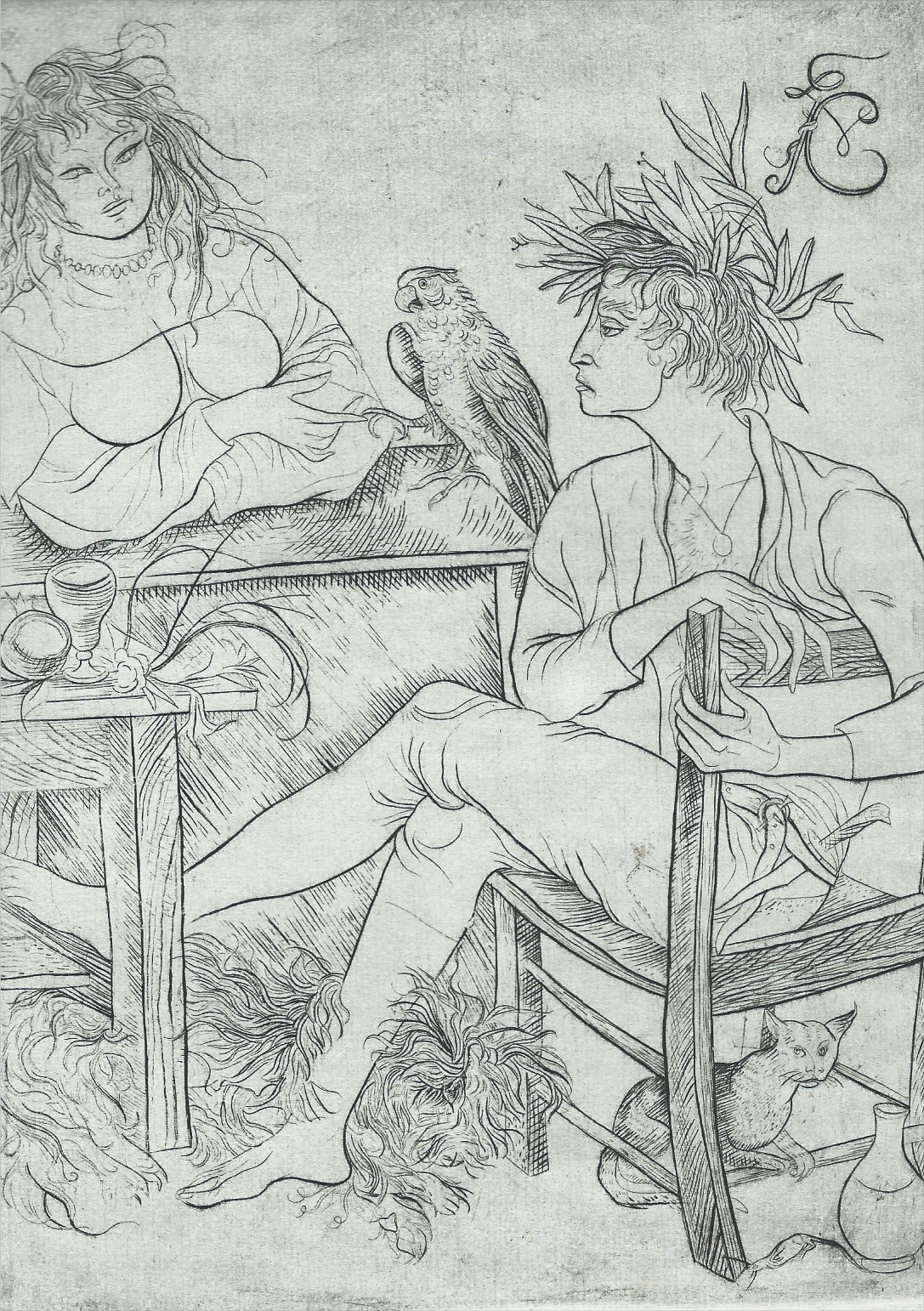
Depiction of Villon by the Mexican artist Federico Cantú Garza

On 5 June 1455, the first major recorded incident of his life occurred. While in the Rue Saint-Jacques in the company of a priest named Giles and a girl named Isabeau, he met a Breton named Jean le Hardi, a Master of Arts, who was also with a priest, Philippe Chermoye (or Sermoise or Sermaise). A scuffle broke out and daggers were drawn. Sermaise, who is accused of having threatened and attacked Villon and drawn the first blood, not only received a dagger-thrust in return, but a blow from a stone, which struck him down. He died of his wounds. Villon fled, and was sentenced to banishment – a sentence which was remitted in January 1456 by a pardon from King Charles VII after he received the second of two petitions which made the claim that Sermaise had forgiven Villon before he died. Two different versions of the formal pardon exist; in one, the culprit is identified as "François des Loges, autrement dit Villon" ("François des Loges, otherwise called Villon"), in the other as "François de Montcorbier." He is also said to have named himself to the barber-surgeon who dressed his wounds as "Michel Mouton." The documents of this affair at least confirm the date of his birth, by presenting him as twenty-six years old or thereabouts.

Around Christmas 1456, the chapel of the Collège de Navarre was broken open and five hundred gold crowns stolen. This was a very large sum, accounting for up to 2 kg (64 ozt) of gold. Villon was involved in the robbery. Many scholars believe that he fled from Paris soon afterward and that this is when he composed what is now known as the Le Petit Testament ("The Smaller Testament") or Le Lais ("Legacy" or "Bequests"). The robbery was not discovered until March of the next year, and it was not until May that the police came on the track of a gang of student-robbers, owing to the indiscretion of one of them, Guy Tabarie. A year more passed, when Tabarie, after being arrested, turned king's evidence and accused the absent Villon of being the ringleader, and of having gone to Angers, partly at least, to arrange similar burglaries there. Villon, for either this or another crime, was sentenced to banishment; he did not attempt to return to Paris. For four years, he was a wanderer. He may have been, as his friends Regnier de Montigny and Colin des Cayeux were, a member of a wandering gang of thieves.

=== Le Testament, 1461 ===
The next date for which there are recorded whereabouts for Villon is the summer of 1461; Villon wrote that he spent that summer in the bishop's prison at Meung-sur-Loire. His crime is not known, but in Le Testament ("The Testament") dated that year he inveighs bitterly against Bishop Thibault d'Aussigny, who held the See of Orléans. Villon may have been released as part of a general amnesty at the accession of King Louis XI and became a free man again on 2 October 1461.

In 1461, he wrote his most famous work, Le Testament (or Le Grand Testament, as it is also known).

In the autumn of 1462, he was once more living in the cloisters of Saint-Benoît.

=== Banishment and disappearance ===
In November 1462, Villon was imprisoned for theft. He was taken to the Grand Châtelet fortress that stood at what is now Place du Châtelet in Paris. In default of evidence, the old charge of burgling the College of Navarre was revived. No royal pardon arrived to counter the demand for restitution, but bail was accepted and Villon was released. However, he fell promptly into a street quarrel. He was arrested, tortured and condemned to be hanged ("pendu et étranglé"), although the sentence was commuted to banishment by the Parlement of Paris on 5 January 1463.

Villon's fate after January 1463 is unknown. Rabelais retells two stories about him which are usually dismissed as without any basis in fact. Anthony Bonner speculated that the poet, as he left Paris, was "broken in health and spirit." Bonner writes further:

He might have died on a mat of straw in some cheap tavern, or in a cold, dank cell; or in a fight in some dark street with another French coquillard; or perhaps, as he always feared, on a gallows in a little town in France. We will probably never know.

== Works ==
Ballades et poèmes diverses

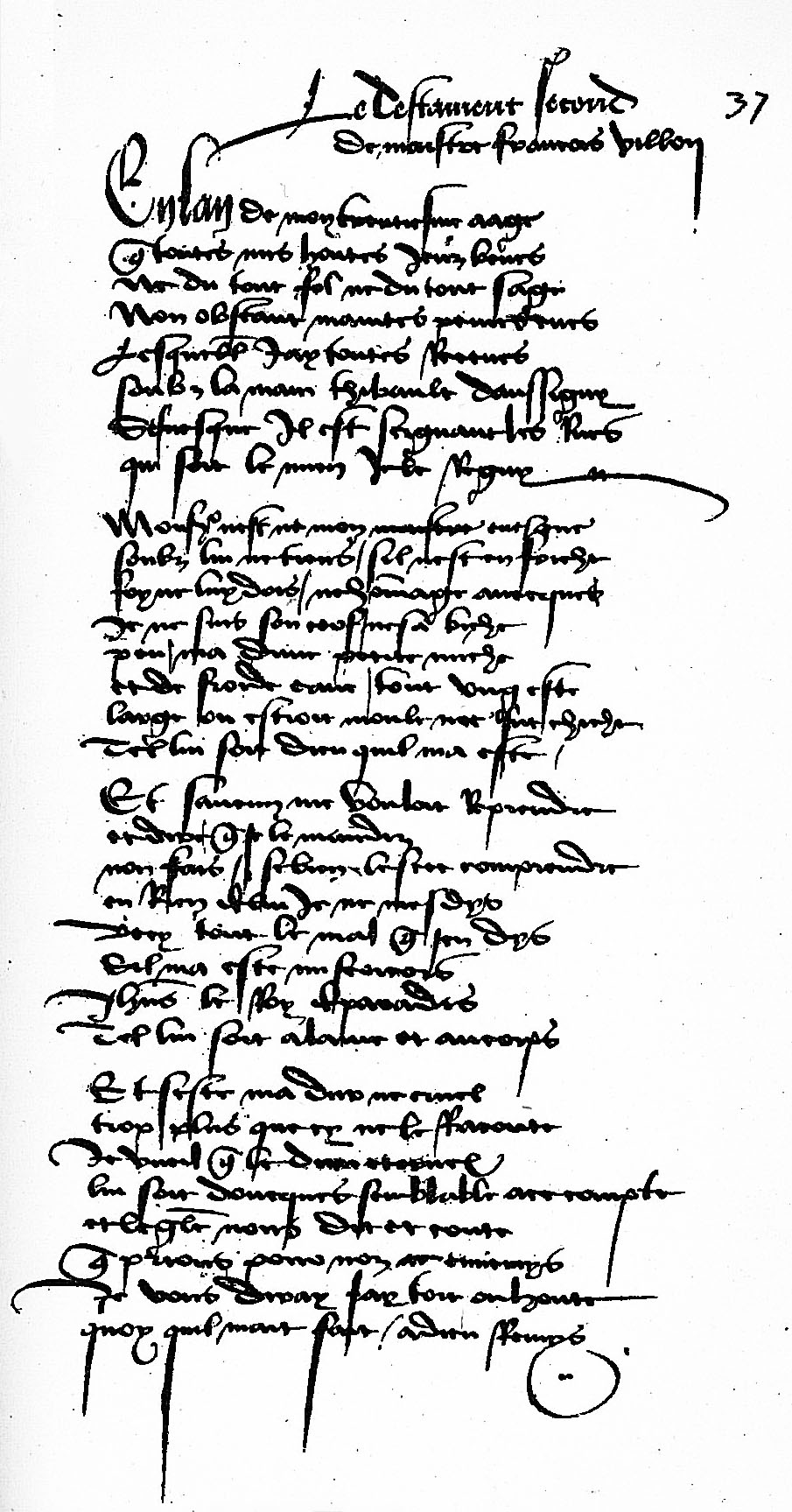
A page from Villon's Le grand testament. Kungliga biblioteket in Stockholm, Sweden.

Le Petit Testament, also known as Le Lais, was written in late 1456. The work is an ironic, comic poem that serves as Villon's will, listing bequests to his friends and acquaintances.

In 1461, at the age of thirty, Villon composed the longer work which came to be known as Le grand testament (1461–1462). This has generally been judged Villon's greatest work, and there is evidence in the work itself that Villon felt the same.

Besides Le Lais and Le grand testament, Villon's surviving works include multiple poems. Sixteen of these shorter poems vary from the serious to the light-hearted. An additional eleven poems in thieves' jargon were attributed to Villon from a very early time, but many scholars now believe them to be the work of other poets imitating Villon.

=== Discussion ===
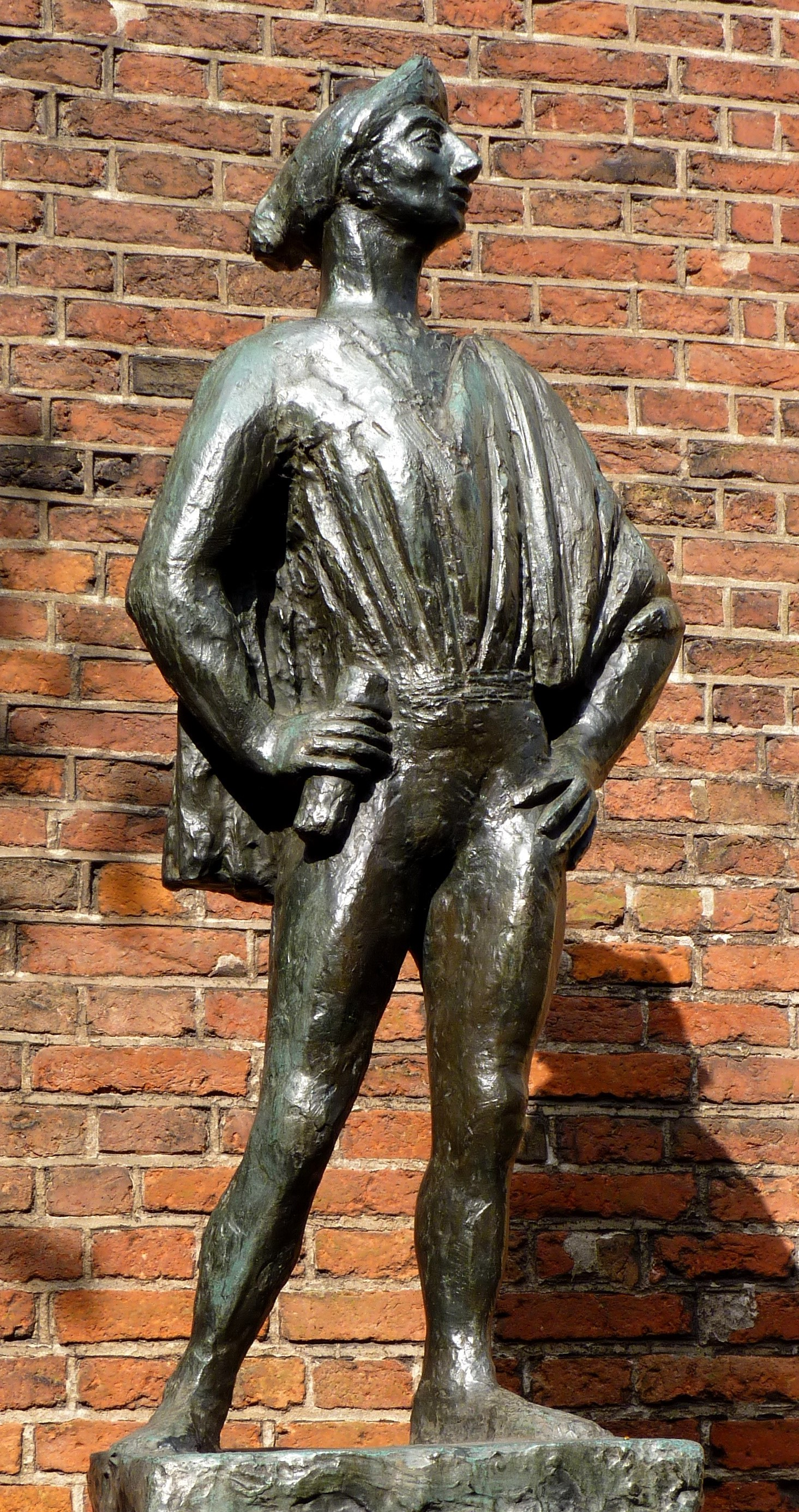
Statue in Utrecht, Netherlands

Villon was a great innovator in terms of the themes of poetry and, through these themes, a great renovator of the forms. He understood perfectly the medieval courtly ideal, but he often chose to write against the grain, reversing the values and celebrating the lowlifes destined for the gallows, falling happily into parody or lewd jokes, and constantly innovating in his diction and vocabulary; a few minor poems make extensive use of Parisian thieves' slang. Still Villon's verse is mostly about his own life, a record of poverty, trouble, and trial which was certainly shared by his poems' intended audience.

Villon's poems are sprinkled with mysteries and hidden jokes. They are peppered with the slang of the time and the underworld subculture in which Villon moved. His works are also replete with private jokes and full of the names of real people – rich men, royal officials, lawyers, prostitutes, and policemen – from medieval Paris.

== English translation ==
=== Complete works ===
George Heyer (1869–1925; father of novelist Georgette Heyer) published a translation in 1924. Oxford University Press brought out The Retrospect of Francois Villon: being a Rendering into English Verse of huitains I TO XLI. Of Le Testament and of the three Ballades to which they lead, transl. George Heyer (London, 1924). On 25 December 1924 it was reviewed in The Times Literary Supplement, p. 886 and the review began "It is a little unfortunate that this translation of Villon should appear only a few months after the excellent rendering made by Mr. J. Heron Lepper. Mr. Heyer's work is very nearly as good, however: he makes happy use of quaint words and archaic idioms, and preserves with admirable skill the lyrical vigour of Villon's huitains. It is interesting to compare his version with Mr. Lepper's: both maintain a scholarly fidelity to the original, but one notes with a certain degree of surprise the extraordinary difference which they yet show." George Heyer was a fluent and idiomatic French speaker and the French and English are printed on opposite pages. The book also contains a number of historical and literary notes.

John Heron Lepper published a translation in 1924. Another translation is one by Anthony Bonner, published in 1960. One drawback common to these English older translations is that they are all based on old editions of Villon's texts: that is, the French text that they translate (the Longnon-Foulet edition of 1932) is a text established by scholars some 80 years ago.

A translation by the American poet Galway Kinnell (1965) contains most of Villon's works but lacks six shorter poems of disputed provenance. Peter Dale's verse translation (1974) follows the poet's rhyme scheme.

Barbara Sargent-Baur's complete works translation (1994) includes 11 poems long attributed to Villon but possibly the work of a medieval imitator.

A new English translation by David Georgi came out in 2013. The book also includes Villon's French, printed across from the English. Notes in the back provide a wealth of information about the poems and about medieval Paris. "More than any translation, Georgi's emphasizes Villon's famous gallows humor...his word play, jokes, and puns".

=== Selections ===
Translations of three Villon poems were made in 1867 by Dante Gabriel Rossetti. These three poems were "central texts" to Rossetti's 1870 book of Poems, which explored themes from the far past, mid-past, and modern time. Rossetti used "The Ballad of Dead Ladies"; "To Death, of his Lady"; and "His Mother's Service to Our Lady".

W.E. Henley, while editing Slang and its analogues translated two ballades into English criminal slang as "Villon's Straight Tip to All Cross Coves" and "Villon’s Good-Night".

American poet Richard Wilbur, whose translations from French poetry and plays were widely acclaimed, also translated many of Villon's most famous ballades in Collected Poems: 1943–2004.

=== Where are the snows of yesteryear? ===
The phrase "Where are the snows of yester-year?" is one of the most famous lines of translated poetry in the English-speaking world. It is the refrain in "The Ballad of Dead Ladies", Dante Gabriel Rossetti's translation of Villon's 1461 "Ballade des dames du temps jadis". In the original the line is: "Mais où sont les neiges d'antan?" ["But where are the snows of yesteryear?"].

Richard Wilbur published his translation of the same poem, which he titled "Ballade of the Ladies of Time Past", in his Collected Poems: 1943–2004. In his translation, the refrain is rendered as: "But where shall last year's snow be found?"

== Critical views ==
Villon's poems enjoyed substantial popularity in the decades after they were written. In 1489, a printed volume of his poems was published by Pierre Levet. This edition was almost immediately followed by several others. In 1533, poet and humanist scholar Clément Marot published an important edition, in which he recognized Villon as one of the most significant poets in French literature, and sought to correct mistakes that had been introduced to the poetry by earlier and less careful printers. His modern reputation stems from a revival in mid-19th century prompted by an essay by Théophile Gautier in his collection Les Grotesques (1844). This drew his poetry to the attention of the French writers later called les poètes maudit, including Charles Baudelaire, Paul Verlaine, Arthur Rimbaud, and Tristan Corbière and also mid-19th century English poets including Dante Gabriel Rossetti and Algernon Charles Swinburne.

== In popular culture ==
=== Stage ===
- Justin Huntly McCarthy's 1901 play and novel, If I Were King, presented a romanticized view of Villon, using the “King for a Day” theme and giving the poet a happy ending with a beautiful noblewoman.
- The Vagabond King is a 1925 operetta by Rudolf Friml. Based on McCarthy's play, it was eventually made into two films. (See below.)
- Die Dreigroschenoper (The Threepenny Opera), from 1928, by Kurt Weill and Bertold Brecht, contains several songs that are loosely based on poems by Villon. These poems include "Les Contredits de Franc Gontier", "La Ballade de la Grosse Margot", and "L'Epitaphe Villon". Brecht used German translations of Villon's poems that had been prepared by K. L. Ammer (Karl Anton Klammer), although Klammer was uncredited.
- Daniela Fischerová wrote a play in Czech that focused on Villon's trial called Hodina mezi psem a vlkem—which translates to "Dog and Wolf" but literally translates as "The Hour Between Dog and Wolf". The Juilliard School in New York City mounted a 1994 production of the play, directed by Michael Mayer with music by Michael Philip Ward.

=== Film and television ===
- McCarthy's play served as the basis for If I Were King, a 1920 silent film starring William Farnum, and for the 1938 version, adapted by Preston Sturges, directed by Frank Lloyd, and starring Ronald Colman as François Villon, Basil Rathbone as Louis XI and Frances Dee as Katherine.
- Rudolf Friml's operetta, The Vagabond King, was adapted to film in 1930 in a two-strip Technicolor film starring Dennis King and Jeanette MacDonald, and in 1956, to a film starring Oreste Kirkop and Kathryn Grayson.
- McCarthy's play was adapted again in 1945 for François Villon, a French historical drama film directed by André Zwoboda and starring Serge Reggiani, Jean-Roger Caussimon, and Henri Crémieux.
- The television biography François Villon was made in 1981 in West Germany, with Jörg Pleva in the title role.
- On the big screen there was a large co-production France-Germany-Romania made in 1987, a 195 minutes movie François Villon – the vagabond poet, directed by the renowned Romanian director Sergiu Nicolaescu, with Florent Pagny playing François Villon.
- The Beloved Rogue is a 1927 American silent romantic adventure film starring John Barrymore, Conrad Veidt and Marceline Day, loosely based on Villon's life.
- Villon's work figures in the 1936 movie The Petrified Forest. The main character, Gabby, a roadside diner waitress played by Bette Davis, longs for expanded horizons; she reads Villon and also recites one of his poems to a wandering hobo "intellectual" played by Leslie Howard.
- In The Adventures of Rocky and Bullwinkle and Friends episode "The Three Moosketeers" (1961), which parodies The Three Musketeers, the prime antagonist is named François Villain.
- I, François Villon, thief, assassin, poet... (TV film, 2011, 90 min), screenplay and direction by Serge Meynard, with Francis Renaud playing François Villon and Philippe Nahon playing Guillaume de Villon, based on the novel by Jean Teulé.
- Villon was portrayed by Andre Philippe in the episode "The Frenchman" of television western Bonanza.

=== Publications ===
- Villon's poem "Tout aux tavernes et aux filles" was translated into English by 19th-century poet William Ernest Henley as "Villon’s Straight Tip To All Cross Coves". Another of Henley's attributed poems – written in thieves' slang – is "Villon’s Good-Night".
- The Archy and Mehitabel poems of Don Marquis include a poem by a cat who is Villon reincarnated.
- In Ursula K. Le Guin's short story “April in Paris” (published in 1962), an American professor of medieval French is in Paris researching the unsolved question of how Villon died when he unexpectedly travels in time back to the late 1400s and gets his answer.
- The author Doris Leslie wrote an historical novel, I Return: The Story of François Villon published in 1962.
- In Antonio Skármeta's novel, El cartero de Neruda, Villon is mentioned as having been hanged for crimes much less serious than seducing the daughter of the local bar owner.
- Valentyn Sokolovsky's poem "The night in the city of cherries or Waiting for François" reflects François Villon's life. It takes the form of a person's memories who knew the poet and whose name one can find in the lines of The Testament.
- Italian author Luigi Critone wrote and illustrated a graphic novel based on Villon's life and works. The 2017 book was entitled Je, François Villon [I, François Villon].
- In 1877, Robert Louis Stevenson wrote two pieces on Villon: a short story titled "A Lodging for the Night: A Story of Francis Villon", which was later collected in New Arabian Nights, and an essay titled "François Villon: Student, Poet, Housebreaker".
- Hunter Thompson's book on American motorcycle gangs, Hell's Angels (1966) starts with a quote: "I am strong but have no power. I win all yet remain a loser. At break of day I say goodnight. When I lie down I have great fear of falling," which he attributes to Villon.
- Maureen Duffy's novel "Londoners: An Elegy" (1983) is about a writer, Al, struggling to write a biography of Villon and identifies his Paris with modern London.
- Guy Gavriel Kay’s novel Written on the Dark (2025) centers on a pastiche of Villon’s life.

=== Music ===
- His poem Der Erdbeermund was a 1989 single for Culture Beat
- The Belgian violinist Eugène Ysaÿe composed Poème No. 5, "Les neiges d'antan", Op.23, for violin and orchestra, in 1911.
- Claude Debussy set three of Villon's poems to music for solo voice and piano
- French singer Georges Brassens included his own setting of Ballade des dames du temps jadis in his album Le Mauvaise Reputation.
- The Swiss composer Frank Martin's Poèmes de la Mort [Poems of Death] (1969–71) is based on three Villon poems. The work is for the unusual combination of three tenors and three electric guitars.
- Villon was an influence on American musician Bob Dylan.
- Russian singer and songwriter Bulat Okudzhava, composed Prayer for Francois Villon, a very popular song.
- Bulgarian metal band Epizod were inspired by Francois Villon, and based their lyrics on his poems during their early career.
- Scottish composer William Wallace in 1909 composed the symphonic poem Villon, depicting episodes in the life of the poet. It has been recorded by Hyperion Records.

=== Art ===
Gaston Duchamp, a Cubist painter and brother of Marcel Duchamp, sought to differentiate himself from his more famous sibling, by adopting Jacques Villon as his pseudonym, as an homage to François Villon.

=== Science ===
10140 Villon, a main belt asteroid discovered in 1993 by Eric Walter Elst at the CERGA Observatory, was named in his honor.

== See also ==
- Le Testament
- List of people who disappeared mysteriously (pre-1910)
