= The Vagabond King =

1925 operetta by Rudolf Friml

- Music: Rudolf Friml
- Lyrics: Brian Hooker; William H. Post
- Book: Brian Hooker; William H. Post
- Basis: If I Were King by Justin Huntly McCarthy
- Productions: 1925 Broadway; 1927 West End; 1943 Broadway revival

The Vagabond King is a 1925 operetta by Rudolf Friml in four acts, with a book and lyrics by Brian Hooker and William H. Post, based upon Justin Huntly McCarthy's 1901 romantic novel and play If I Were King. The story is a fictionalized episode in the life of the 15th-century poet and thief François Villon, centering on his wooing of Katherine De Vaucelles (the cousin of King Louis XI), and relating how he becomes “king for a day” and defends France against the invading forces of the Duke of Burgundy.

The original production opened on Broadway in 1925, starring Dennis King, and ran for 511 performances. The operetta then played in London, toured extensively and enjoyed revivals and two film adaptations, including one with King and Jeanette MacDonald.

== Background ==
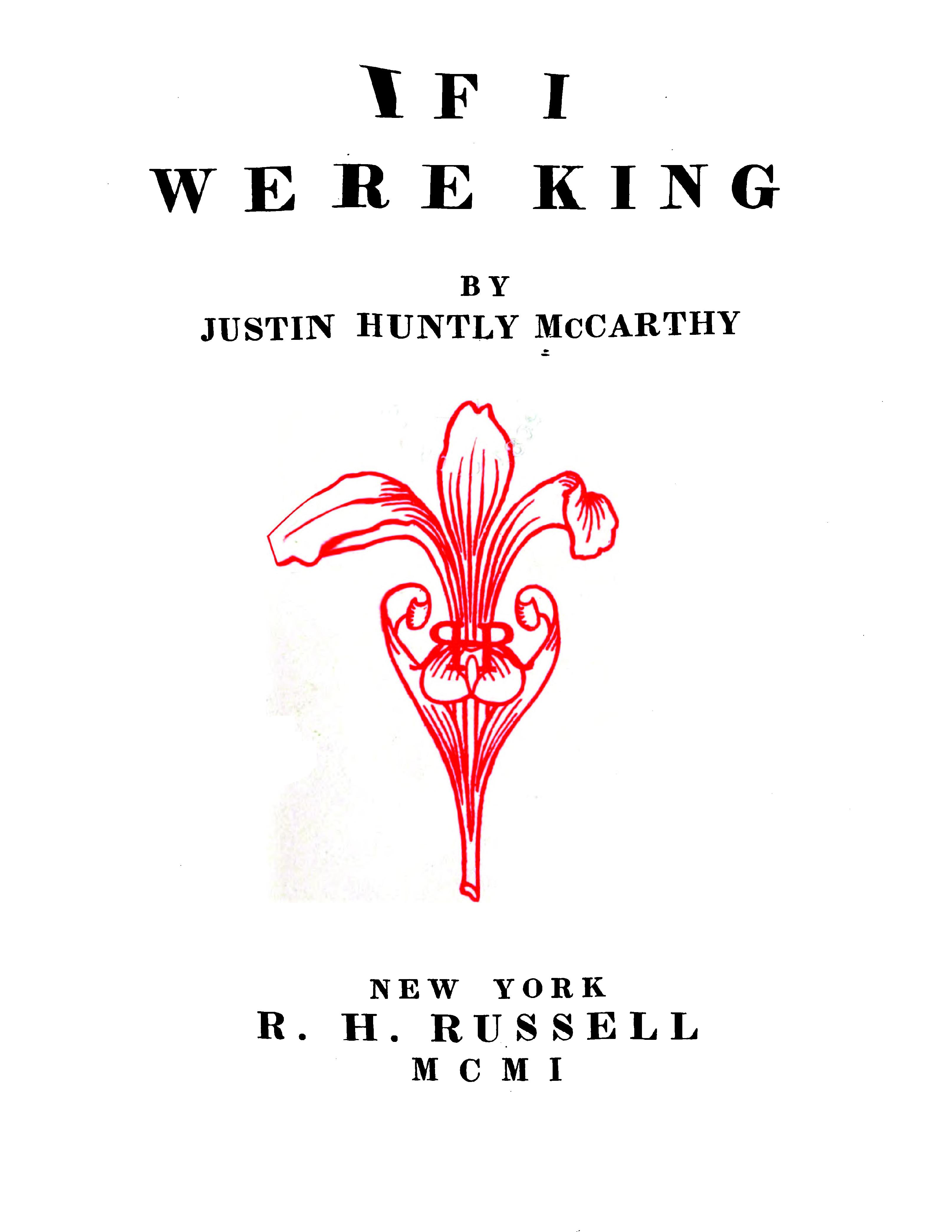
Title page from the 1901 novel If I Were King

In 1901, writer Justin Huntly McCarthy sentimentalized Villon's career in a novel, If I Were King, that borrowed the king-for-a-day theme, allowing Villon to defeat France's enemies and win the hand of an aristocratic lady, all in under 24 hours. The author adapted it as a Broadway play the same year and in London in 1902, and it was revived several times. In 1923, Richard Rodgers and Lorenz Hart were at the beginning of their careers. They created a musical version of the McCarthy play for a Manhattan girls' school and then looked for a more prestigious venue for their collaboration. Broadway backers turned down the young team, but producer Russell Janney "borrowed" their idea and commissioned the more established Rudolf Friml to compose, and Brian Hooker to adapt the piece into a musical, increasing the comedy roles.

The original production opened at the Casino Theatre on September 21, 1925. It starred Dennis King as Villon and Carolyn Thomson as Katherine and ran for a very successful 511 performances. The production was lavish and used an unusually large pit orchestra. It received unanimously enthusiastic reviews. The operetta then had a successful run in London in 1927 at the Winter Garden Theatre, running for 480 performances, and toured extensively. Its revivals include a 1943 Broadway revival. It was also performed regularly in the 1970s and 1980s in New York by the Light Opera of Manhattan.

A 1930 musical film with the same title was filmed in two-color Technicolor, with Dennis King reprising his stage role. Jeanette MacDonald and Lillian Roth co-starred. It was long thought lost, but was recovered and restored in 1998. Several non-Friml songs were added in this version. The film was remade in 1956 in regular Technicolor and VistaVision. It starred Kathryn Grayson, Oreste Kirkop, Rita Moreno, Walter Hampden and Cedric Hardwicke. Only a few songs were from the original, but new Friml numbers were added. Leslie Nielsen and Jack Lord were featured in villainous roles. This remake was not a success.

The McCarthy novel was adapted as a silent film in 1920 and as a 1938 nonmusical film, If I Were King, which starred Ronald Colman as Villon.

== Synopsis ==
Paris is under siege by the forces of the Duke of Burgundy; popular support for King Louis XI is at a low point. Villon – poet, braggart, thief and darling of the Paris rabble – has sent anonymous love poems to the beautiful Katherine de Vaucelles. These have caused her to reject proposals from King Louis. She goes to seek the mysterious poet at an inn, but King Louis shadows her in disguise. Louis is incensed to hear Villon mocking the failures of his reign and saying what he would do instead "if I were king." The infuriated monarch reveals himself. The king gives Villon a hard choice: as punishment for speaking treasonously, he must either stop courting Katherine or accept the position of Grand Marshal, with all the powers of King, for 24 hours, during which time he must make good on his boasts and free Paris. At the end of the 24 hours, Villon will hang. Villon's dilemma is that he has promised himself to Huguette, his mistress, but now is deeply in love with Katherine.

Villon and Katherine declare their love for each other ("Only a Rose"). Hugette describes her means of livelihood ("Love for Sale"). Villon accepts Louis' challenge. Rather than sending the King's Scottish mercenaries against the Burgundians, Villon rouses the Paris mob to defend the city. Huguette discovers that Thibault, one of Louis's advisors, is a traitor. When Thibault ambushes Villon and tries to stab him to death, Huguette steps in front of the blade and takes the blow, thus sacrificing her life, and freeing Villon to be with Katherine. He kills Thibault in retaliation and then leads the Paris rabble to fight the Burgundians. The Parisians emerge victorious. After the battle is over, Katharine offers to sacrifice herself to the hangman in order to save Villon. Louis, realizing he cannot shed noble blood without a just cause, rewards Villon with exile instead of death, and the two lovers leave together.

== Roles and original cast ==
- Katherine (soprano) – Carolyn Thomson
- Huguette (mezzo-soprano) – Jane Carroll
- Lady Mary, a courtier – Olga Treskoff
- François Villon (lyric baritone; a tenor in the 1956 film) – Dennis King
- Guy Tabarie (baritone) – Herbert Corthell
- Noel, a Court popinjay – Herbert Delmore
- Oliver, Keeper of the Royal Bath – Julian Winter
- Captain of the Scotch Archers – Charles Carver
- Rene, a rogue – Robert Craik
- The Herald of Burgundy – Earl Waldo
- Fat Margot, keeper of a tavern-brothel – Catherine Hayes
- King Louis (non-singing) – Max Figman
- Tristan l'Hermite, his trusted adviser (non-singing) – H. H. McCullum
- Thibault d'Aussigny, his traitorous Grand Marshal (non-singing) – Bryan Lycan
- Isabeau and Jehanneton, harlots (non-singing) – Vivian Kelley and Mimi Hayes
- The Queen (non-singing) – Tamm Cortez
- Jehan, a thief (non-singing) – Marius Rogati
- Casin, an astrologer (non-singing) – Leon Cunningham

== Musical numbers ==
Act 1

- Life is Like a Bubble in Our Glasses – Ensemble
- Love for Sale – Huguette du Hamel, Chorus and Dance Ensemble
- Drinking Song (A Flagon of Wine) – Guy Tabarie and Male Chorus
- Song of the Vagabonds – Villon and Chorus
- Some Day – Katherine de Vaucelles
- Only a Rose and Finale – Katherine and Villon

Act 2

- Hunting – Noel Le Jolys, Chorus and Dance Ensemble
- Scotch Archers' Song – Captain of Scotch Archers and Archers
- Tomorrow – Katherine, Villon and Chorus
- Finale, Act II – Ensemble

Act 3

- Nocturne – Ensemble & Ballet
- Serenade – Oliver Le Dain, Guy Tabarie and Lady Mary
- Waltz Huguette (Huguette Waltz - "Never try to Bind Me") – Huguette du Hamel
- Love Me Tonight – Katherine and Villon
- Finale, Act III – Ensemble

Act 4

- Te Deum – Ensemble
- Victory March ("Song of the Vagabonds" reprise) and Finale, Act IV – Ensemble
