= Some Day (1925 song) =

Song composed by Rudolf Friml performed by Frankie Laine

Single by Frankie Laine with Paul Weston and His Orchestra

from the album The Vagabond King
- B-side: "There Must Be a Reason"
- Published: 1925
- Released: May 17, 1954
- Recorded: January 8, 1953
- Genre: Traditional pop
- Length: 2:32
- Label: Columbia
- Composer: Rudolf Friml
- Lyricist: Brian Hooker

"Some Day" is a song, with music by Rudolf Friml and words by Brian Hooker, originally published in 1925. It was included in Friml's operetta The Vagabond King, sung by Carolyn Thomson in the role of Katherine de Vaucelles.

The song was sung by Jeanette MacDonald in the first musical film version of The Vagabond King, made in 1930, and by Kathryn Grayson in the 1956 remake. The song was recorded a number of times afterward, but the only version popular enough to chart in Billboard was recorded in 1954 by Frankie Laine. His recording was released by Columbia Records as catalog number 40235. It first reached the Billboard Best Seller chart on June 23, 1954 and lasted six weeks on the chart, peaking at number 18.

== Recorded versions ==
- Nancy Anderson
- Mimi Benzell (1951)
- Eddie Fisher (1966 LP, This Is Eddie Fisher)
- Jean Fenn (1956)
- Jackie Gleason Orchestra
- Jerry Gray and his orchestra
- Kathryn Grayson (Film Soundtrack, 1956)
- Lois Hunt and Earl Wrightson (1951)
- Frankie Laine (1954)
- Mario Lanza and Judith Raskin (1956)
- Sergio Franchi and Anna Moffo duet on 1963 RCA Victor Red Seal album The Dream Duet
- Jeanette MacDonald (Film Soundtrack, 1930)
- Tony Martin (1952)
- Winnie Melville (London production, 1927)
- 101 Strings
- Rocco Scotti
- Carolyn Thomson (Broadway Production, 1925)
- Bob Wilber
