= Walter Hampden =

American actor (1879–1955)

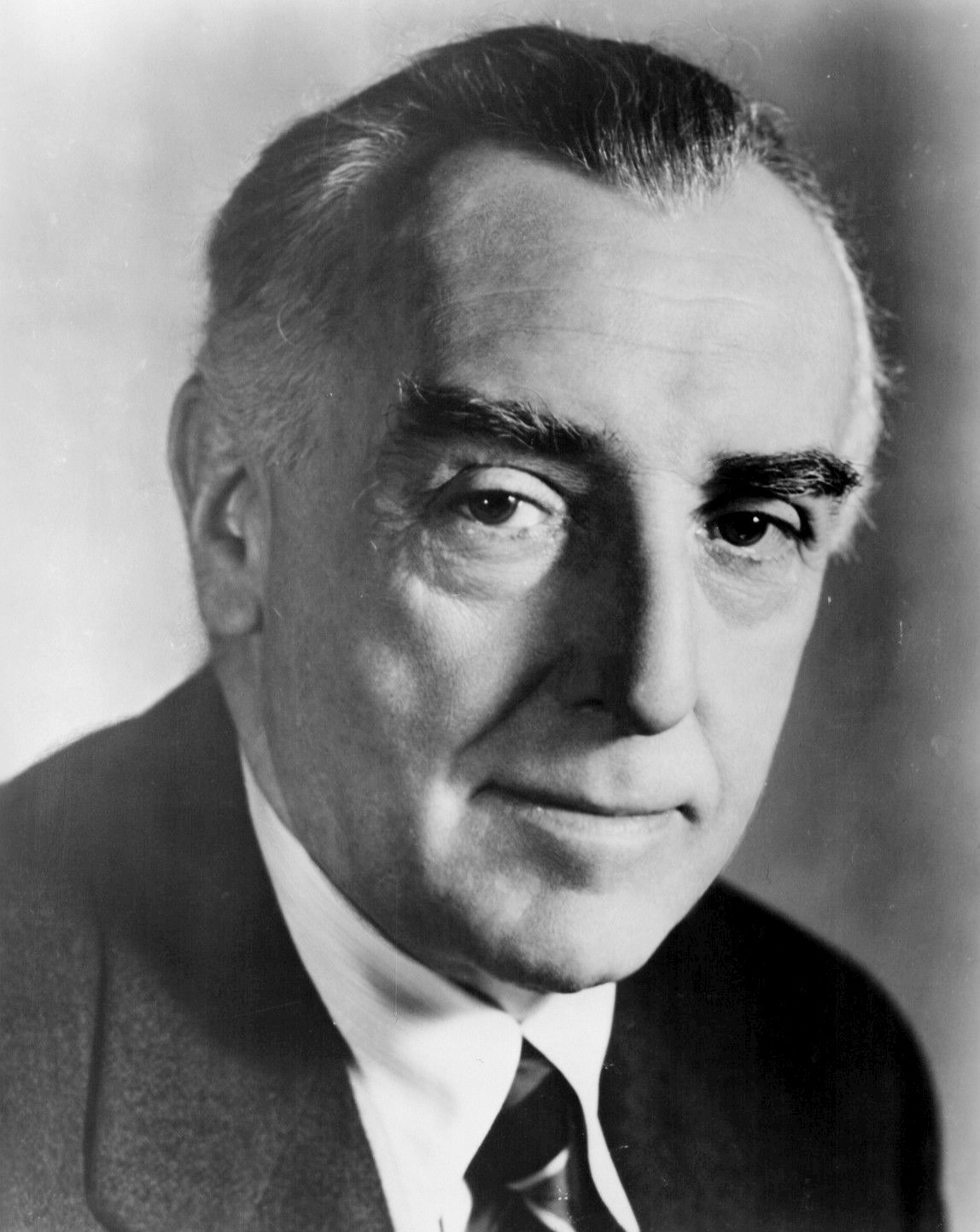
- Hampden in 1951
- Born: Walter Hampden Dougherty; June 30, 1879; Brooklyn, New York, U.S.
- Died: June 11, 1955 (aged 75); Los Angeles, California, U.S.
- Occupations: Stage, film, television actor, theatre manager
- Years active: 1900–1955
- Spouse: Mabel Moore (1905-?)
- Children: 2

Walter Hampden Dougherty (June 30, 1879 – June 11, 1955), known professionally as Walter Hampden, was an American actor and theatre manager. He was a major stage star on Broadway in New York who also made numerous television and film appearances.

== Life and career ==
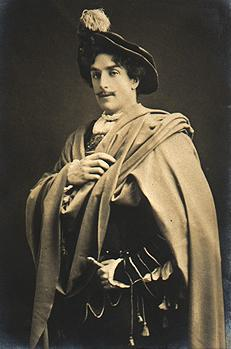
Walter Hampden as Lucentio in The Taming of the Shrew at the Adelphi Theatre, London (1904)

Walter Hampden was the son of John Hampden Dougherty and Alice Hill. He was a younger brother of the American painter Paul Dougherty. He went to England for apprenticeship for six years. He graduated from what is now NYU Poly in 1900. Under Otho Stuart and Oscar Asche's co-management of the Adelphi Theatre in 1904 he appeared in The Prayer of the Sword and The Taming of the Shrew. Later he played Hamlet, Henry V and Cyrano de Bergerac on Broadway. In 1925, he became actor-manager at the Colonial Theatre on Broadway, which was renamed Hampden's Theatre from 1925 to 1931. He became noted for his Shakespearean roles as well as for Cyrano, which he played in several productions between 1923 and 1936. He appeared on the cover of Time in March 1929. Hampden's last stage role was as Danforth in the original Broadway production of Arthur Miller's The Crucible. Actor Harry Irvine, who had played Horatio to Hampden's Hamlet, said: "Mr. Hampden is an artist who never finishes with a role. He is always studying and adding to it, eager to listen to criticism and learn from it". Irvine also praised Hampden's generosity as leading player towards other actors on stage with him, willingly conceding the center to minor characters.

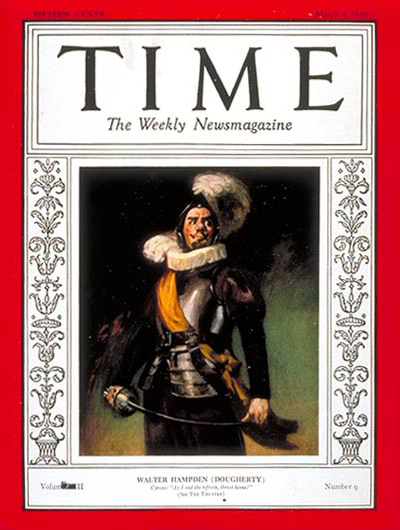
Hampden on the cover of Time in 1929, while he was the producer, director, star and theatre manager of a Broadway revival of Cyrano de Bergerac

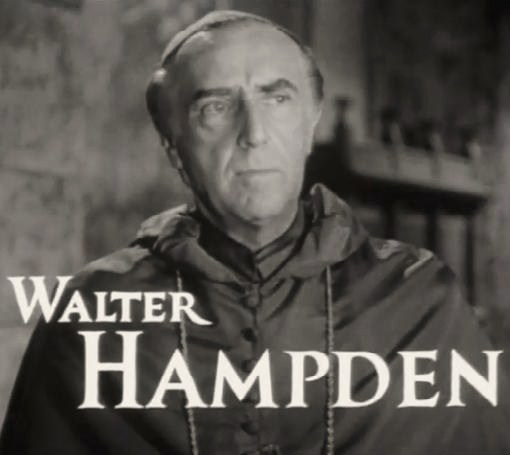
Hampden as the Archdeacon in The Hunchback of Notre Dame (1939)

John Garrett Underhill produced the first English-language version of The Bonds of Interest (Los intereses creados) by Jacinto Benavente, with Walter Hampden, in 1929.

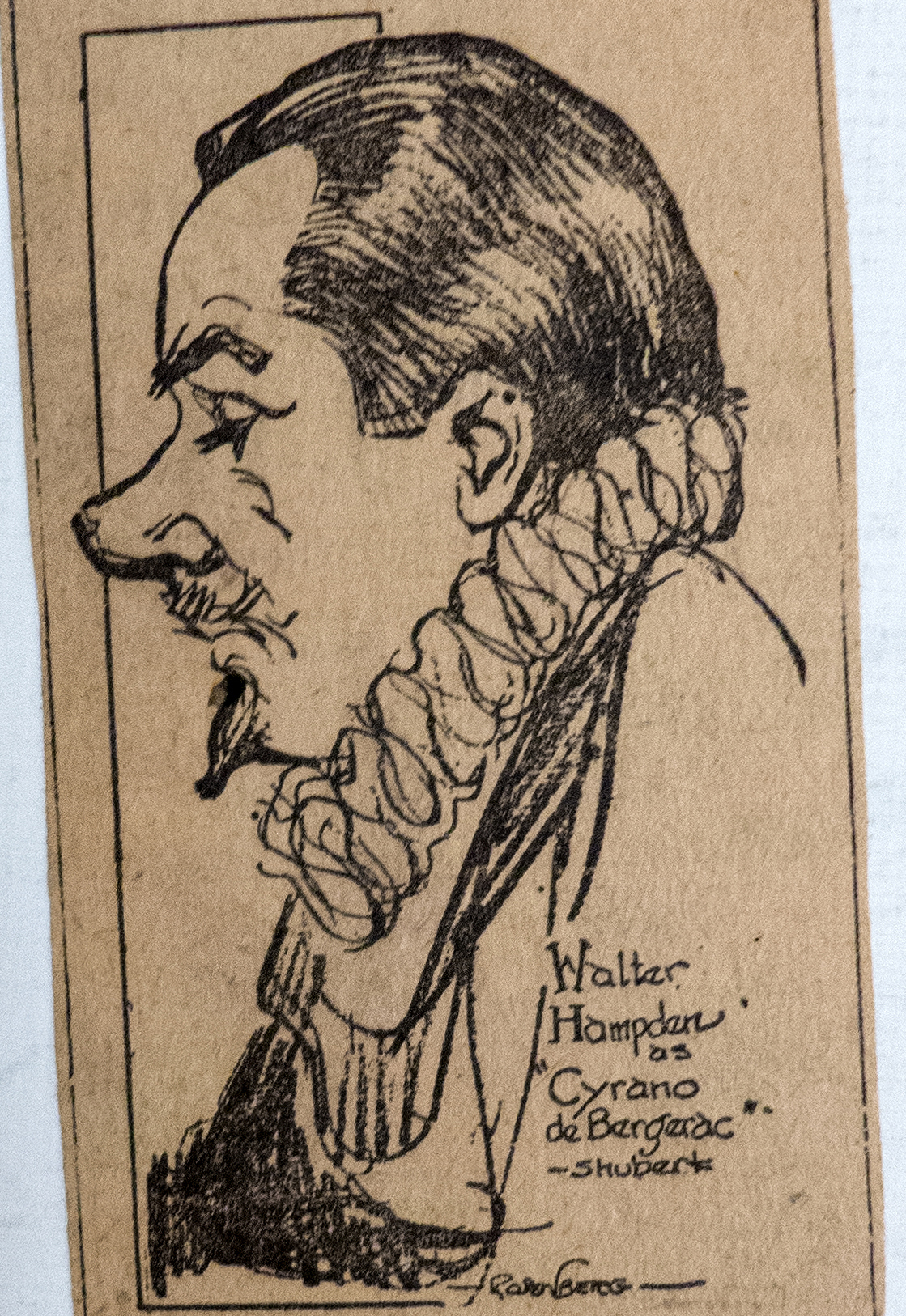
Walter Hampden as Cyrano de Bergerac, drawing by Manuel Rosenberg for the Cincinnati Post, 1924

Hampden appeared in a few silent films, but did not really begin his film career in earnest until 1939, when he played the good Archdeacon (Frollo's brother) in The Hunchback of Notre Dame, starring Charles Laughton as Quasimodo. This was Hampden's first sound film; he was 60 at the time he made it. Several other roles followed—Jarvis Langdon in the 1944 film The Adventures of Mark Twain among them, but all were supporting character roles, not the lead roles that Hampden played onstage. He was the master of ceremonies at the Sarah Siddons Awards (Aged Actor) in All About Eve (1950), and he played the father of Humphrey Bogart and William Holden in Billy Wilder's 1954 comedy Sabrina. These last two films are arguably those for which Hampden is most well known to modern audiences. He also played long-bearded patriarchs in the Biblical epics The Silver Chalice (1954, as Joseph of Arimathea) and The Prodigal (1955).

Hampden reprised his portrayal of Cyrano de Bergerac in the first episode of the radio program Great Scenes from Great Plays, which Hampden hosted from 1948 to 1949. In addition to his radio roles (The Adventures of Leonidas Witherall), Hampden also appeared in several dramas during the early days of television. He made his TV debut in 1949, playing Macbeth for the last time at the age of 69. In 1951 he portrayed Captain Fairfax in a televised version of Louis O. Coxe and Robert H. Chapman's 1951 play Billy Budd for the anthology series Schlitz Playhouse of Stars.

His last role was the non-singing one of King Louis XI of France, considered by some to be one of his best performances, in the otherwise unremarkable 1956 Technicolor remake of Rudolf Friml's 1925 operetta The Vagabond King. It was released posthumously, more than a year after Hampden's death.

For 27 years, Walter Hampden was president of the Players' Club. The club's library is named for him.

His ashes are buried at The Evergreen Cemetery in Brooklyn, New York.

== Personal life ==
Hampden married actress Mabel Carrie Moore on 17 July 1905. They had a son, Paul Hampden Dougherty, and a daughter, Mary Moore Dougherty.

== Filmography ==
Year	Title	Role	Notes
1917	The Warfare of the Flesh	Henry Goode	Film debut
1939	The Hunchback of Notre Dame	Archdeacon	
1940	All This, and Heaven Too	Pasquier	
1940	North West Mounted Police	Big Bear	
1941	They Died with Their Boots On	William Sharp	
1942	Reap the Wild Wind	Commodore Devereaux	
1944	The Adventures of Mark Twain	Jervis Langdon	
1949	The Philco Television Playhouse	Macbeth	Episode: Macbeth
1950	All About Eve	Aged Actor	
1951	Pulitzer Prize Playhouse	Andrew Jackson	Episode: Portrait of a President
1951	The First Legion	Father Edward Quarterman	
1951	Schlitz Playhouse of Stars	Daniel Webster	Episode: Decision and Daniel Webster
1952	5 Fingers	Sir Frederic Taylor	
1953	Treasure of the Golden Condor	Pierre Champlain	
1953	Sombrero	Don Carlos Castillo	
1954	Sabrina	Oliver Larrabee	
1954	The Silver Chalice	Joseph of Arimathea	
1955	The Prodigal	Eli	
1955	Strange Lady in Town	Father Gabriel Mendoza	
1956	The Vagabond King	King Louis XI	Final film; released posthumously
