= Tristan l'Hermite =

French political and military figure (died c. 1478)

See also François Tristan l'Hermite

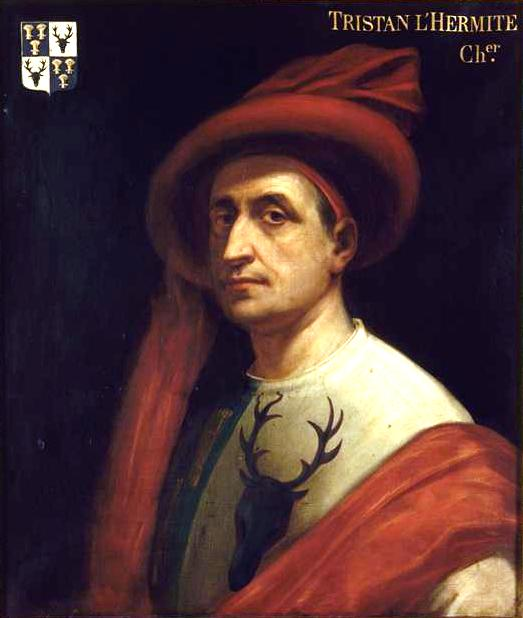
Portrait of Tristan l'Hermite, 19th century

Tristan l'Hermite (died c. 1478) was a French political and military figure of the late Middle Ages. He was born in Flanders near the beginning of the century.

He was provost of the marshals of the King's household under Louis XI. Prior to this, he was also a provost marshal to Charles VII. He had also become captain of Mussy-l'Évêque in 1431 and then Grand Master of Artillery in 1436. He was awarded knighthood in 1451.

The mystique surrounding his name caused the 17th-century French poet and playwright François l'Hermite to take his name as a pseudonym.

He appears as a figure in Victor Hugo's Notre-Dame de Paris, in Honore De Balzac’s novella Maitre Cornelius, in Walter Scott's Quentin Durward, in the Justin Huntly McCarthy play If I Were King, and in the operetta made from the play, Rudolf Friml's The Vagabond King. He is also a character, as a young man still in the service of Arthur III of Brittany, in Juliette Benzoni's "Catherine" novel, Les Routes incertaines.
