= Rose-Marie =

Operetta-style musical by Rudolf Friml and Herbert Stothart

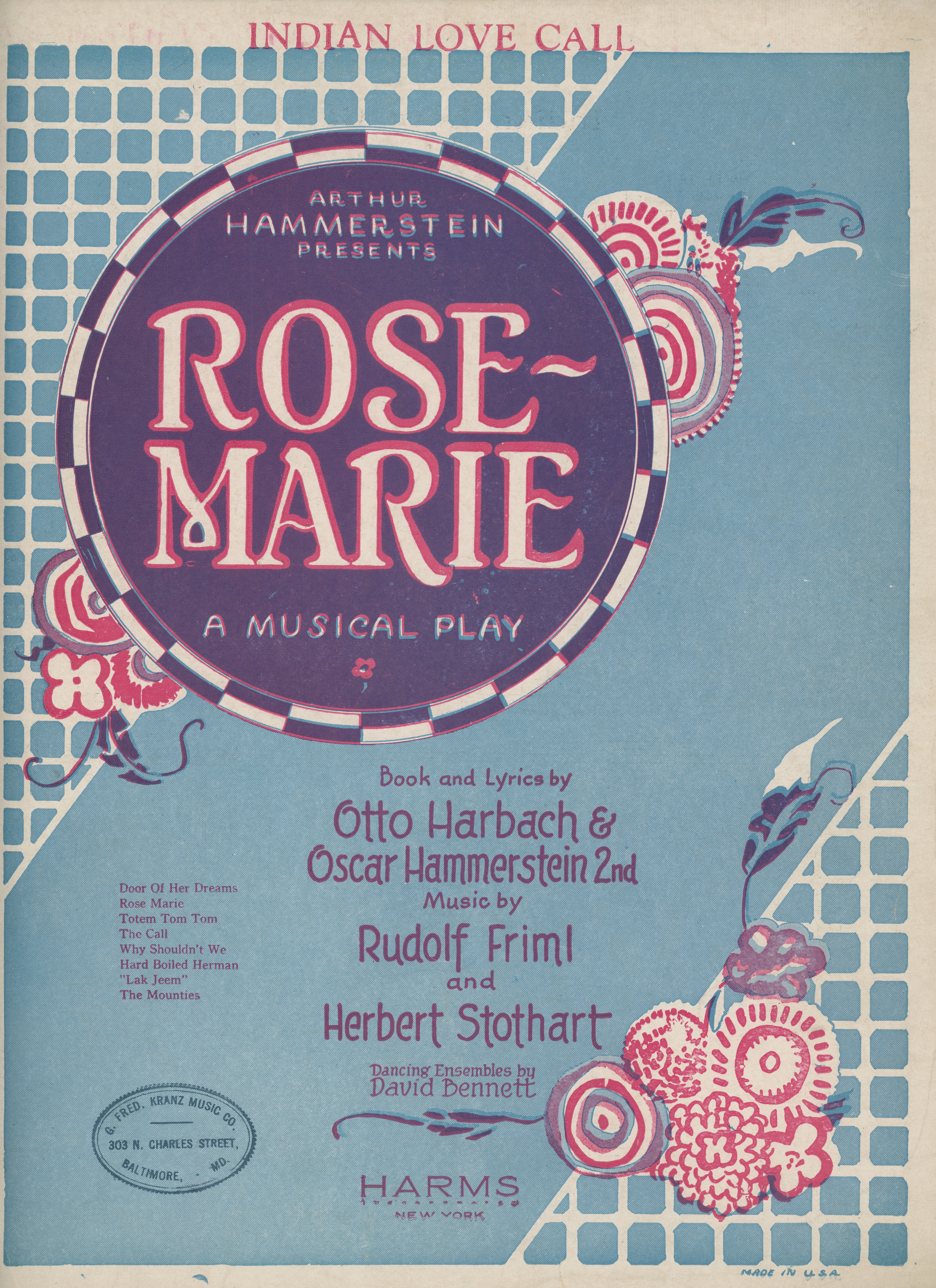
- Sheet music cover
- Music: Rudolf Friml; Herbert Stothart
- Lyrics: Otto Harbach; Oscar Hammerstein II
- Book: Otto Harbach; Oscar Hammerstein II
- Productions: 1924 Broadway; 1925 West End; 1928 silent film 1936 film 1954 film

Rose-Marie is an operetta-style musical with music by Rudolf Friml and Herbert Stothart, and book and lyrics by Otto Harbach and Oscar Hammerstein II. The story is set in the Canadian Rocky Mountains and concerns Rose-Marie La Flemme, a French Canadian girl who loves miner Jim Kenyon. When Jim falls under suspicion for murder, her brother Emile plans for Rose-Marie to marry Edward Hawley, a city man.

The work premiered on Broadway at the Imperial Theatre on September 2, 1924, running for 557 performances. It was the longest-running Broadway musical of the 1920s until it was surpassed by The Student Prince (1926). It was then produced at the Theatre Royal, Drury Lane in London in 1925, enjoying another extraordinary run of 581 performances. It was filmed in 1928, in 1936 and again in 1954.

The best-known song from the musical is "Indian Love Call". It became Jeanette MacDonald and Nelson Eddy's "signature song". Several other numbers have also become standards, including the title song.

== Background ==
Producer Arthur Hammerstein, attempting to create popular new Broadway shows in the operetta tradition, sought exotic, unusual settings for his new productions. The Fortune Teller (1898) is set in Hungary, The Merry Widow (1907) takes place in France, and Naughty Marietta (1910) features New Orleans. He sent his nephew, Oscar Hammerstein II, and Otto Harbach to Quebec, Canada, to witness a rumored magnificent ice sculpture festival. The men reported that there was not, nor had there ever been, such a festival in Quebec or any part of Canada.

Arthur Hammerstein still liked the Canadian setting, and Oscar Hammerstein II and Harbach began work on the book for a new musical set in the Canadian Rockies. Rudolf Friml and Herbert Stothart collaborated on the score, and opera star Mary Ellis was cast in the title role. British actor and singer Dennis King was cast opposite her as Jim Kenyon.

== Productions and adaptations ==
Stage versions

Rose-Marie premiered on September 2, 1924, at the Imperial Theatre in New York City, running for 557 performances. Direction was by Paul Dickey and choreography was by Dave Bennett. The orchestrations were by Robert Russell Bennett. Costumes were designed by Charles LeMaire, and settings were by Gates and Morange. It had a brief revival on Broadway in 1927.

It was then produced at the Theatre Royal, Drury Lane in London in 1925, enjoying another extraordinary run of 581 performances. The original West End production had a chorus of eighty. It was London's most successful Broadway show after World War I until it was surpassed by Oklahoma!. In Paris's Théâtre Mogador, Rose-Marie ran for an unprecedented 1,250 performances.

A touring company premiered the work in Canada on January 12, 1925, at the Royal Alexandra Theatre in Toronto, and the piece toured Australia and played in Paris. Other Canadian productions were given by the Variétés lyriques in 1937 and another in 1945, in French, and by Theatre Under the Stars in 1940, Melody Fair in 1951, and the Eaton Operatic Society in 1959. It was produced by the Light Opera of Manhattan several times in the 1970s and 1980s, the Shaw Festival in Canada (1981), Light Opera Works of Illinois (1987), and Ohio Light Opera in 2003.

Film versions

The show has been filmed three times, including a silent film in 1928. Joan Crawford starred in this version, alongside James Murray. The best known film version was released in 1936, starring Jeanette MacDonald and Nelson Eddy. Although the plot was changed, and most of the songs were dropped, it was a huge success and became MacDonald and Eddy's best-known film. In 1954, MGM produced an Eastmancolor version in Cinemascope, which more closely followed the original plot, but it still dropped most of Friml's songs. This version starred Ann Blyth, Howard Keel and Fernando Lamas, with Bert Lahr and Marjorie Main as comic relief. It was choreographed by Busby Berkeley.

Little Mary Sunshine

Rose-Marie is the main (but not the only) target of the satirical musical Little Mary Sunshine, which parodies elements of the plot as well as the style of several of the songs. In particular, the song "Colorado Love Call" from Little Mary Sunshine is a parody of "Indian Love Call" from Rose-Marie.

== Synopsis ==
Act I

In Fond-du-Lac, Saskatchewan, Canada, trappers, hunters and travellers gather at "Lady" Jane's hotel ("Vive la Canadienne"). Royal Canadian Mounted Police Sergeant Malone is flirting with Lady Jane, while wealthy city man Edward Hawley is watching a French Canadian girl, Rose-Marie La Flamme, even though she's miner Jim Kenyon's sweetheart. Rose-Marie's brother, Emile, is searching for her, fearing she is alone with Jim. Wanda, a half-blooded Indian, dances close to Hawley, enraging her Indian lover, Black Eagle. Lady Jane's man, the cowardly "Hard-Boiled Herman", arrives at the bar. Jim arrives to greet Rose-Marie enthusiastically and explains to Sergeant Malone that he has given up his former wild ways because of his love for "Rose-Marie". Black Eagle claims some land (and the gold on it) belonging to Jim and Herman. Herman thinks that shooting Black Eagle will solve everything, but Jim prefers to use legal means, declaring that he will visit Black Eagle and show him the boundary line the property map. Sergent Malone and "The Mounties" warn Herman that they will not hesitate to enforce the laws.

Emile is going to take Rose-Marie with him to the trapping grounds at Kootenay Pass. He dislikes Jim and wants her to marry Hawley for financial security. Rose-Marie doesn't want to go, insisting to her brother that she is in love with Jim ("Lak Jeem"). Hawley plans to accompany Emile, but first he has to end his affair with Wanda. He plans to visit her at Black Eagle's log cabin and bribe her to stay away from him. Jim tells Rose-Marie that he will follow her to Kootenay Pass, and they will meet in an old house he calls a castle near a valley with a beautiful echo. According to legend, Indians would call down into the valley to the girls they wished to marry ("Indian Love Call").

Hawley meets Wanda at her cabin and tries to pay her off, just as Jim arrives with a map to prove his claim. Wanda sends Jim away. Black Eagle returns home and catches Wanda and Hawley embracing. He attacks Hawley, and Wanda stabs Black Eagle to save Hawley. Jim and Herman, unaware of the murder, follow Emile, Hawley, and Rose-Marie to Kootenay Pass. Jim and Rose-Marie communicate through their "Indian Love Call" (reprise). Emile tells Rose-Marie that she should marry Hawley because he could buy her all the "Pretty Things" she wants. Wanda arrives at Kootenay Pass and tells everyone that Jim is wanted for the murder of Black Eagle; his map was discovered near Black Eagle's body.

Herman continues romancing Lady Jane ("Why Shouldn't We?"). Hawley proposes to Rose-Marie, but she refuses him. He and a city girl whom he has employed, Ethel Brander, try to impress Rose-Marie with the glamour of city life in Quebec. Wanda leads an Indian "Totem-Tom-Tom" dance. Jim has received an offer from the Brazilian government to lead a mining project there. He asks Rose-Marie to come with him, even though it would be safer for her to go to Quebec and wait for him there. If she decides to come, they will meet at the "castle" and go to the United States to be married. If she does not, she should sing the Indian Love Call up the valley to him. Rose-Marie insists she will go with him; he leaves immediately, and she plans to follow twenty minutes later to avoid attracting suspicion. Sergeant Malone arrives with a warrant to arrest Jim for murder. Emile knows that Jim is hiding in the "castle". He tells Rose-Marie that he will not reveal Jim's hiding place to the Mounties if she will go to Quebec and marry Hawley. Holding back tears, Rose-Marie tells Hawley that she must sing the "Indian Love Call" to him, but she is really singing to Jim, telling him that she will not go with him.

Act II

Many months have passed. Rose-Marie is about to marry Hawley in Quebec, believing that Jim was the killer. Ethel Brander has convinced her that Jim murdered Black Eagle because he loved Wanda. Herman and Lady Jane have married, and they have a shop in Quebec. He still flirts with other women, but he catches her giving Sergeant Malone "Only a Kiss". Jim returns with Wanda intending for her to clear his name. But, seeing Wanda, Rose-Marie jumps to conclusions about Jim and Wanda. Rose-Marie tells Jim that she loves Hawley ("I Love Him").

The wedding preparations commence ("The Minuet of the Minute"), and Wanda jealously threatens Hawley. Sergeant Malone prepares to arrest Jim, who is hiding in Kootenay Pass, even though Malone is troubled by the evidence. Herman suspects Wanda and gets her to confess by pretending that Hawley has accused her of the murder. Jane interrupts them and incorrectly assumes Herman is cheating on her ("One Man Woman"). The wedding begins ("Doorway of My Dreams"), but as Rose-Marie walks down the aisle, Wanda publicly confesses to the murder and declares her love for Hawley. Everyone rushes to Jim's lodgings, and Rose-Marie goes to the pass to return Jim's "Indian Love Call". The lovers are finally united.

== Music ==
=== Musical numbers ===
Act I

- "Vive la Canadienne" – Sergeant Malone and Ensemble
- "Hard-Boiled Herman" – Hard-Boiled Herman and Ensemble
- "Rose-Marie" – Jim Kenyon and Sergeant Malone
- "The Mounties" – Sergeant Malone and Ensemble
- "Lak Jeem" – Rose-Marie La Flamme and Ensemble
- "Rose-Marie (Reprise)" – Rose-Marie, Sergeant Malone, Edward Hawley, Emile and Ensemble
- "Indian Love Call" – Rose-Marie and Jim
- "Pretty Things" – Rose-Marie and Ensemble
- "Why Shouldn't We?" – Lady Jane and Hard-Boiled Herman
- "Totem Tom-Tom" – Wanda and Ensemble

Act II

- "Pretty Things (Reprise)" – Ethel Brander and Girls
- "Only a Kiss" – Hard-Boiled Herman, Lady Jane and Sergeant Malone
- "I Love Him" – Rose-Marie, Jim, Hawley, Emile, Ethel and Wanda
- "The Minuet of the Minute" – Rose-Marie and Hard-Boiled Herman
- "One Man Woman" – Lady Jane, Hard-Boiled Herman and Ensemble
- "The Door of Her Dreams (Door of My Dreams)" – Ensemble

=== Musical style ===
In Rose-Marie, Friml and Stothart emulated the late 19th-century Viennese operetta style of Johann Strauss II and American composer Victor Herbert, using lilting waltzes and sweeping romantic or sentimental passages. They added to this new dance styles, notably the foxtrot (for example in the title song of the show).

== Recordings ==
The operetta has been recorded a number of times. The 1925 original London cast recorded six numbers along with an orchestral medley. These recordings have been collected on a number of LP and CD editions. Al Goodman recorded the major songs in 1948 as part of his series of operetta recordings for RCA Victor. These were reissued on LP on the budget RCA Camden label in 1958.

Nelson Eddy recorded eight numbers for a Columbia Records ten-inch LP in 1950. Around the same time, singles recorded by Eddy and MacDonald in 1936, at the time of the film's release, were reissued in an extended play 45 rpm disc by RCA Victor Red Seal as ERA 220. The sleeve featured a photo of the two of them as they appeared in the film. The MGM soundtrack album of the 1954 technicolor and CinemaScope remake was released on records just before the film's premiere in March 1954.

The most complete recording released before 2022 was made in 1958 by RCA Victor (Rose Marie #LSO-1001) starring Julie Andrews and Giorgio Tozzi. In 1961 EMI issued an LP of selections with Barbara Leigh, David Hughes, Andy Cole and Maggie Fitzgibbon (Cole and Fitzgibbon had appeared together in a 1961 London revival). The following year, Reader's Digest included a recording of one side of highlights in their 12-record Treasury of Great Operettas set. The Smithsonian Institution recorded the complete score, performed in concert in 1981, conducted by James R. Morris, starring Debra Vanderlinde and Ron Raines, but the recording was not commercially released until 2022.
