= Oreste Kirkop =

Maltese singer

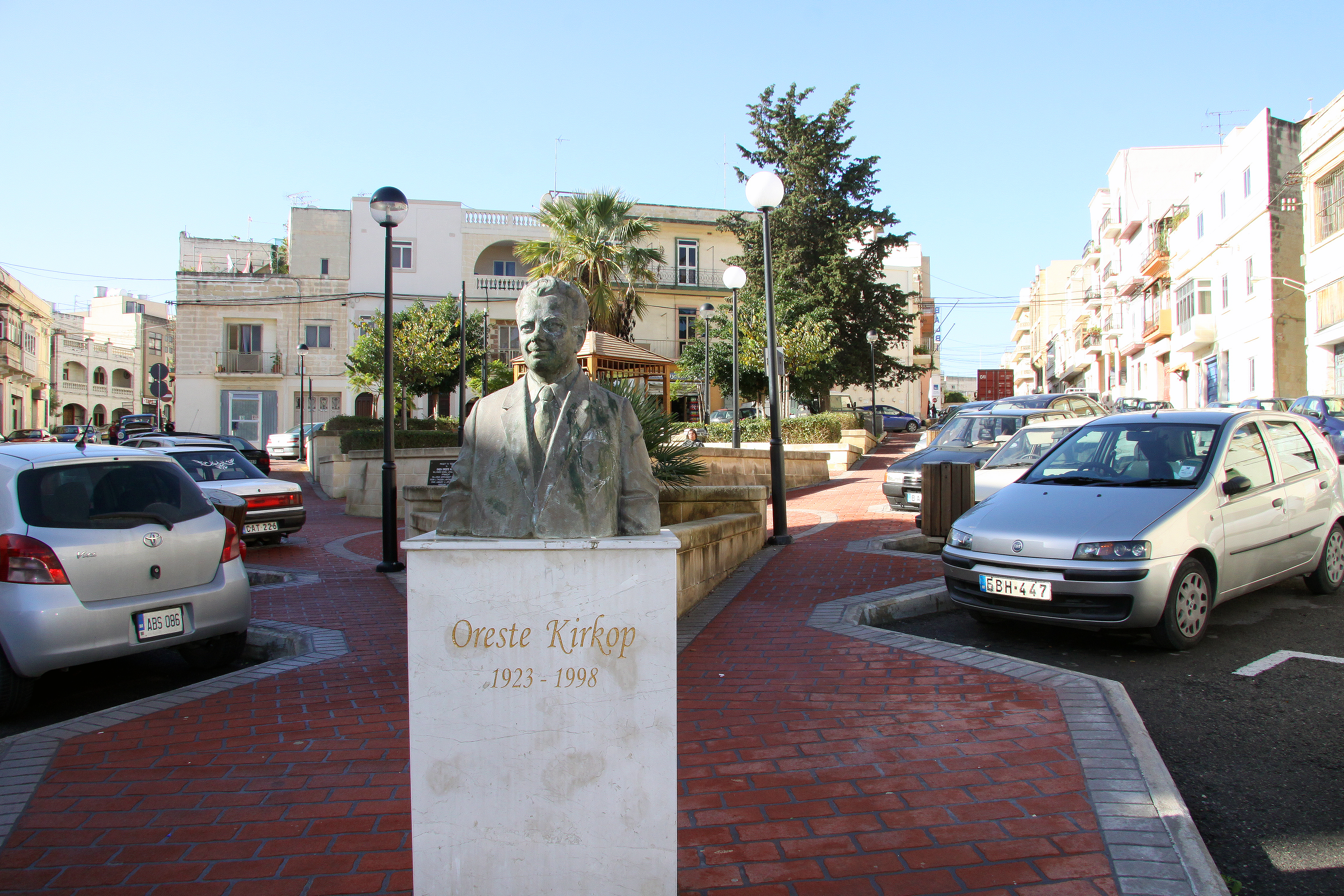
Bust of Oreste Kirkop in Ħamrun, Malta.

Oreste Kirkop (Chircop) (26 July 1923 – 10 May 1998) was a Maltese singer.

== Biography ==
Kirkop was born in Ħamrun (Malta). He was the sixth child among the ten siblings of Jean Chircop and Fortunata Panzavecchia. He started to realise his singing capabilities while singing in the shelters during wartime. Afterwards he took lessons from Maltese tenor Nicolo Baldachino. Oreste made his operatic debut on 25 February 1945 as Turiddu in Cavalleria Rusticana at the Radio City Opera House in Ħamrun (Malta). In 1948, he met Maltese baritone Joseph Satariano who encouraged him to start an opera career in the UK. Between 1949 and 1950 he continued singing opera with visiting Italian companies and appeared in concert with Tito Gobbi and Maria Caniglia.

In 1950 he moved to the United Kingdom and sang principal tenor roles with the Carl Rosa Opera Company, later with Sadler's Wells (1952) singing Turiddu, Mario Cavaradossi, and Rodolfo in Luisa Miller. He appeared on BBC TV as Canio in Pagliacci.

In 1954, Kirkop made his Covent Garden debut as the Duke in Rigoletto and later as Rodolfo in La Bohème. A contract with Paramount Pictures led to the leading role of François Villon in the 1956 film version of The Vagabond King.

He sang opera at Las Vegas and the Hollywood Bowl and appeared on NBC TV in pioneering productions of Madame Butterfly, La traviata and Rigoletto.

On 4 August 1956 he performed at the Hollywood Bowl Concert in Los Angeles with the Los Angeles Philharmonic and the Roger Wagner Chorale under the direction of Carmen Dragon.

In 1958 he returned to Covent Garden. He married his wife Therese in Malta on 15 August 1963 and they had two daughters, Anita and Susan. He retired completely from singing in 1960 at the age of 37. His retirement was mainly due to heart problems after being told by doctors that he might die on stage if he continued his singing career after the age of 40. Oreste Kirkop died aged 74 on 10 May 1998.
