= High Jinks (musical) =

Musical farce

High Jinks is a musical farce with music by Rudolf Friml and book and lyrics by Otto Harbach and Leo Ditrichstein, based on the farce Before and After by Leo Ditrichstein which was adapted from a French farce, Les Dragees d'Hercule, by Maurice Hennequin and Paul Bilhaud.

The musical is set in France and concerns several patients of Dr Thorne who take High Jinks, an elixir found in Tibet, which causes them to laugh and fall in love. "Something Seems Tingle-Ingleing" and "Love's Own Kiss" are two of the best known songs.

Directed by Frank Smithson, High Jinks opened at the Casino Theatre on Broadway on December 10, 1913, and ran for 213 performances. A London production at the Adelphi Theatre opened in August 1916 and ran for 383 performances.

== Sources ==
- Everett, William (2008). Rudolf Friml. Chicago: University of Chicago Press. ISBN 9780252033810.
