= 10140 Villon =

Main-belt asteroid

Discovery
- Discovered by: E. W. Elst
- Discovery site: CERGA Obs.
- Discovery date: 19 September 1993

Designations
- Named after: François Villon (French poet)
- Alternative designations: 1993 SX_{4} · 1973 GZ; 1977 KH · 1984 CJ; 1990 WQ_{15}
- Minor planet category: main-belt · (inner); Nysa–Polana complex

Orbital characteristics
- Epoch 23 March 2018 (JD 2458200.5)
- Uncertainty parameter 0
- Observation arc: 44.91 yr (16,402 d)
- Aphelion: 2.7383 AU
- Perihelion: 2.1022 AU
- Semi-major axis: 2.4203 AU
- Eccentricity: 0.1314
- Orbital period (sidereal): 3.77 yr (1,375 d)
- Mean anomaly: 340.65°
- Mean motion: 0° 15^{m} 42.48^{s} / day
- Inclination: 2.6208°
- Longitude of ascending node: 165.49°
- Argument of perihelion: 21.421°

Physical characteristics
- Mean diameter: 4.785±0.134 km
- Geometric albedo: 0.280±0.078
- Absolute magnitude (H): 13.7

10140 Villon, provisional designation 1993 SX_{4}, is an asteroid from the inner regions of the asteroid belt, approximately 5 kilometers (3 miles) in diameter. It was discovered on 19 September 1993, by Belgian astronomer Eric Elst at the CERGA Observatory at Caussols in France. It was named after 15th-century French poet François Villon.

== Orbit and classification ==
Villon is member of the Nysa–Polana complex, a collection of overlapping asteroid families. It orbits the Sun in the inner main-belt at a distance of 2.1–2.7 AU once every 3 years and 9 months (1,375 days; semi-major axis of 2.42 AU). Its orbit has an eccentricity of 0.13 and an inclination of 3° with respect to the ecliptic. The body's observation arc begins with its first observations as 1973 GZ at the Crimean Astrophysical Observatory in April 1973, more than 20 years prior to its official discovery observation at Caussols.

== Physical characteristics ==
Villon's spectral type has not been determined, Based on its family classification and measured albedo (see below), it is likely a stony S-type asteroid. It has an absolute magnitude of 13.7. As of 2018, no rotational lightcurve of Villon has been obtained from photometric observations. The body's rotation period, pole and shape remain unknown.

=== Diameter and albedo ===
According to the survey carried out by the NEOWISE mission of NASA's Wide-field Infrared Survey Explorer, Villon measures 4.785 kilometers in diameter and its surface has an albedo of 0.280.

== Naming ==
This minor planet was named after medieval French poet François Villon (1431–1463). The official naming citation was published by the Minor Planet Center on 28 July 1999 (M.P.C. 35493).
