= Sometime (musical) =

Sometime is a musical in two acts, with a book and lyrics by Rida Johnson Young and music by Rudolf Friml. Additional lyrics are by Ed Wynn. The romantic story concerns a couple kept apart for five years after the man is seen in a compromising position with another woman, but it turns out that this was a ruse planned by the other woman, and the man is innocent. The story enfolds in flashbacks (a novelty at the time) set in New York and Buenos Aires; with periodic shifts in time to the present in an unknown location.

The musical opened at the Schubert Theatre on Broadway on October 4, 1918, and transferred the following month to the Casino Theatre, running there until June 7, 1919 for a total of 283 performances. It was produced by Arthur Hammerstein and directed by Oscar Eagle. The music director was Herbert Stothart. It starred Wynn, Francine Larrimore, Harrison Brockbank and Mae West.
