= Dennis King (actor) =

English actor and singer (1897–1971)

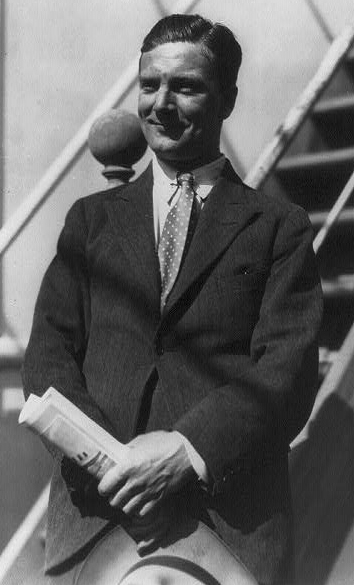
- King circa 1927
- Born: Dennis Pratt; 2 November 1897; Coventry, Warwickshire, England
- Died: 21 May 1971 (aged 73); New York City, US
- Citizenship: United Kingdom; United States (from 1953)
- Years active: 1919–1969
- Spouse: Edith Wright (?–1963) (her death)
- Children: 2, including John Michael

Dennis King (né Pratt; 2 November 1897 – 21 May 1971) was an English actor and singer.

== Early years ==
Born on 2 November 1897 in Coventry, Warwickshire, or Birmingham, England, King was the son of John and Elizabeth King Pratt. He chose to use his mother's maiden name for his career. He had one sister and three brothers. King described his father as "a man of tremendous vision but little initiative", resulting in the family's being "very poor".

His first involvement with the stage was working as a call boy at the Birmingham Repertory Theater when he was 14 years old. He first performed on stage at age 16. He served in the Oxford Bucks Infantry during World War I. Injured in battle, he spent a night in a "muddy shell hole" before stretcher-bearers took him to a first-aid station for initial treatment. Two days later he was moved to a field hospital, where plastic surgeons repaired the damage that shrapnel had done to his face. He was discharged, and he returned to London.

== Career ==
King had a stage career in both drama (including Shakespeare) and musicals. He immigrated to the US in 1921 and went on to a successful career on the Broadway stage. Among his most notable performances was his role in the original production of Rudolf Friml, Otto Harbach, and Oscar Hammerstein II's Rose-Marie, in which he introduced the songs "Rose-Marie" and "Indian Love Call", and the role of Captain Fairfax in the Donaldson Award and Outer Critics Circle Award winning play Billy Budd (1951) by Louis O. Coxe and Robert H. Chapman.

King debuted in London in 1919 and on Broadway in 1921. His career turned from drama to music after Oscar Hammerstein heard him singing in his dressing room. Persuaded by Hammerstein, King tried out for the male lead in Rose Marie. His success in that production led to his performing in other musical comedy shows.

He appeared in two musical films, including The Vagabond King, and played non-singing roles in two other films.

King was "one of the first actors of major status to devote himself almost exclusively to television". He appeared in six full-length dramas on TV from the fall of 1948 to February 1949. He also was featured in TV musical productions, including Knickerbocker Holiday (1950), Babes in Toyland (1950), Jack and the Beanstalk (1956), Aladdin (1958), and The Mikado (1960).

== Personal life and death ==
King became a citizen of the United States in 1953. He was made president of The Players in June 1965.

King was married to actress Edith Wright. They had two sons, Dennis King Jr. and musical theatre actor John Michael King, who originated the role of Freddy Eynsford Hill in My Fair Lady. Dennis King pursued his hobby of painting later in life.

King died of a heart disease in University Hospital in New York City on 21 May 1971, aged 73.

== Musical theatre credits ==
- 1919: Monsieur Beaucaire (London production)
- 1923: Hamlet researching (Chicago production with John Barrymore)
- 1925: Rose-Marie as Jim Kenyon (Broadway production)
- 1925: The Vagabond King as François Villon (Broadway production)
- 1928: The Three Musketeers as d'Artagnan (Broadway production)
- 1930: The Three Musketeers as d'Artagnan (London production)
- 1932: Show Boat as Gaylord Ravenal (Broadway revival)
- 1933: Command Performance (musical) as Peter Mali (London production)
- 1937: Frederika as Goethe (Broadway production)
- 1938: I Married an Angel as Count Willi Palaffi (Broadway production)
- 1951: Music in the Air as Bruno Mahler (Broadway revival)
- 1956: Shangri-La as Hugh Conway (Broadway production)

== Musical film credits ==
- 1930: The Vagabond King as François Villon
- 1930: Paramount on Parade as Man to be Hanged - Episode 'The Gallows Song'
- 1933: Fra Diavolo (also known as The Devil's Brother and Bogus Bandits), a version of Daniel Auber's Fra Diavolo – although Laurel and Hardy were the stars, King played the title role) as Fra Diavolo / Marquis de San Marco

== Other film credits ==
- 1944: Between Two Worlds (a remake of the 1930 film Outward Bound), as a minister William Duke
- 1959: The Miracle as a nobleman who is one of Carroll Baker's admirers
- 1969: Some Kind of a Nut as Otis Havemeyer (final film role)

== Television credits ==
- 1957: Twelfth Night (as Sir Toby Belch, on the Hallmark Hall of Fame) as Sir Toby Belch
- 1958: Aladdin (CBS color television special with songs by Cole Porter) (presented on the DuPont Show of the Month)
- 1960: The Mikado (NBC colour television special with Groucho Marx, Stanley Holloway and Helen Traubel) (presented by the Bell Telephone Hour)
- 1961: Give Us Barabbas! (as Pontius Pilate) (presented on the Hallmark Hall of Fame)
- 1962: Act of Faith (Season 7 Episode 27 of Alfred Hitchcock Presents) as Ralston Temple
