= Casino Theatre (New York City) =

Former theatre in Manhattan, New York

Coordinates: 40.75362°N 73.9871°W

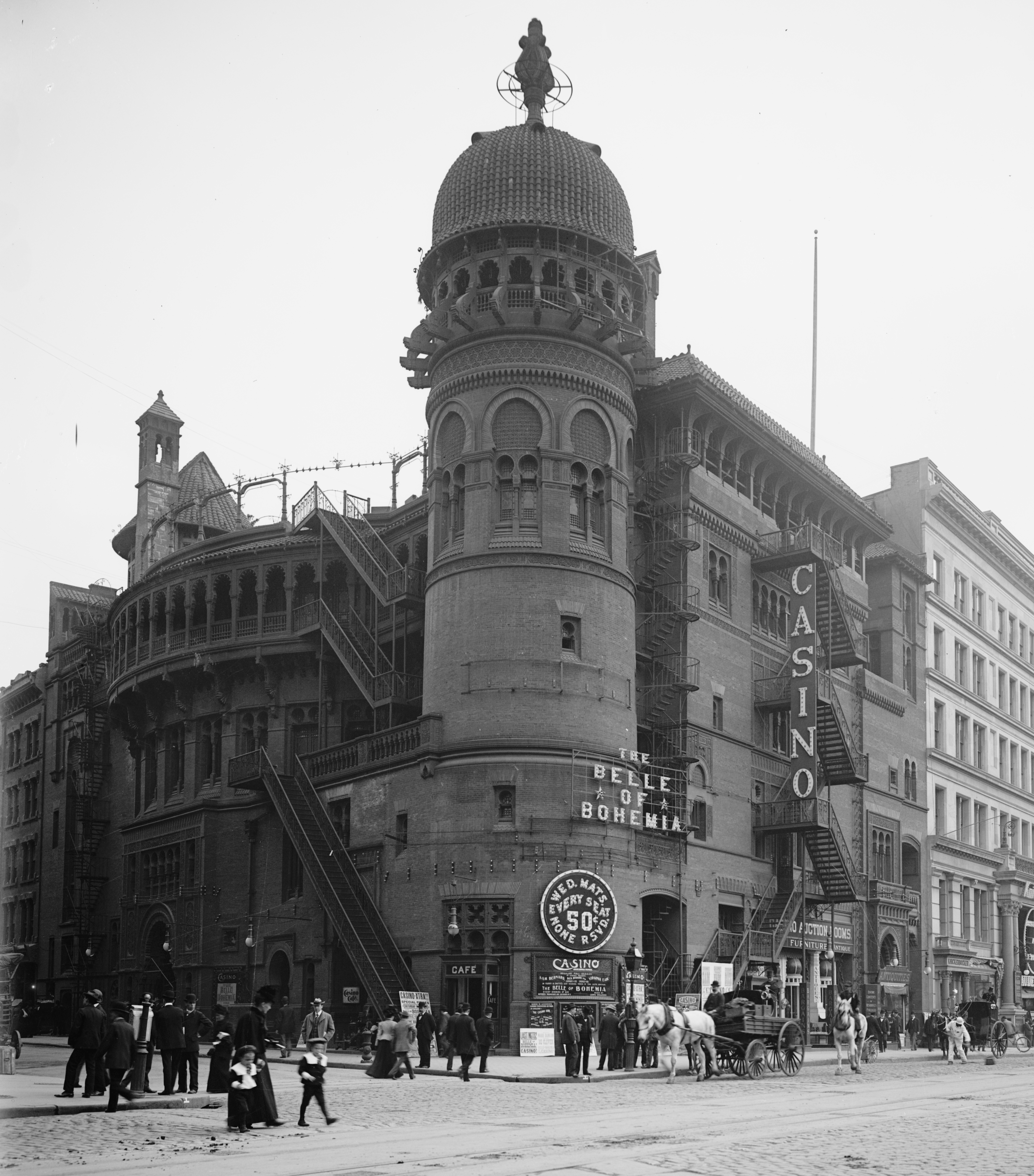
- Casino Theatre, 1900

General information
- Architectural style: Moorish Revival
- Location: Manhattan, New York City
- Opened: 1882
- Closed: 1930
- Demolished: 1930

Design and construction
- Architects: Francis Hatch Kimball and Thomas Wisedell

The Casino Theatre was a Broadway theatre located at 1404 Broadway and West 39th Street in New York City. Built in 1882, it was a leading presenter of mostly musicals and operettas until it closed in 1930.

The theatre was the first in New York to be lit entirely by electricity, popularized the chorus line and later introduced white audiences to African-American shows. It originally seated approximately 875 people, however the theatre was enlarged in 1894 and again in 1905, after a fire, when its capacity was enlarged to 1,300 seats. It hosted a number of long-running comic operas, operettas and musical comedies, including Erminie, Florodora, The Vagabond King and The Desert Song. It closed in 1930 and was demolished the same year.

== History ==
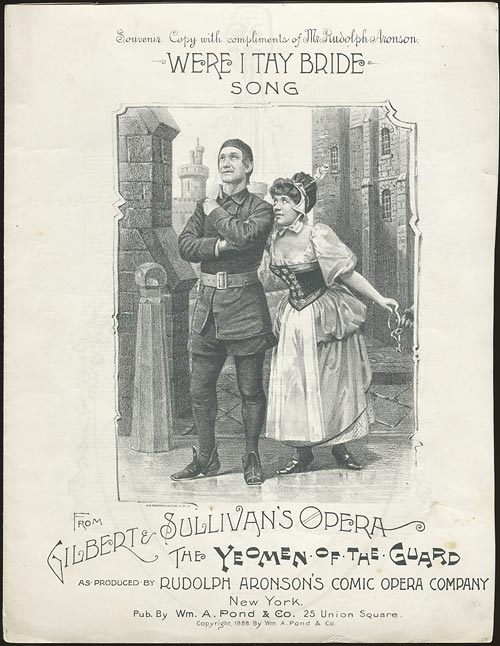
Souvenir illustration from the theatre's production The Yeomen of the Guard, 1888

The Casino Theatre was built at the behest of producer and composer Rudolph Aronson and paid for by prominent New York society members including the Vanderbilts, Roosevelts, and Goulds. It was designed in Moorish Revival style by architects Francis Hatch Kimball and Thomas Wisedell, was the first theatre in New York to be lit entirely by electricity. It was built in 1882 more than 15 blocks north of where the theatre district was then centered, 23rd Street. In 1890, New York's first roof garden was added to the theatre. It originally seated approximately 875 people, however the theatre was enlarged in 1894 and again when it was rebuilt in 1905 after a fire in 1903. The redesigned Casino seated 1,300.

The theatre opened with productions by the McCaull Comic Opera Company. It was first managed by Aronson, and later by Canary & Lederer from 1894 to 1903, and from 1903 by the Shuberts. As the center of the Broadway theatre district moved uptown, north of 42nd Street, the Casino closed in 1930. It was demolished the same year, along with the nearby Knickerbocker Theatre, to make way for the expanding Garment District.

The Casino hosted a series of successful operettas and other musical theatre pieces in the 1880s and 1890s, including the extraordinarily successful Erminie. In 1891, it premiered Cavalleria Rusticana in America, and in 1894 it presented the first Broadway revue, The Passing Show. In 1898, it was host to the premiere of Clorindy, or The Origin of the Cake Walk, the first African-American musical to be presented before a white audience.

The theatre is perhaps best remembered, however, as having been the home of the 1900 production of the Edwardian musical comedy, Florodora. In that show, it became the first theatre in New York to feature a chorus line, the "Florodora Sextet". The sextet's original lineup included a number of ladies who would later achieve fame and fortune. The production "elevated the chorus girl into ... an attraction in its own right." Evelyn Nesbit was a chorus girl in the show in 1901. Over the decades, the theatre also became known for its free Christmas presentations for New York children.

Over the next decade, the theatre continued to present musicals and operettas, some of the most successful being A Chinese Honeymoon (1902), The Earl and the Girl (1905) and The Chocolate Soldier (1909). During World War I, it hosted transfers of several of the Princess Theatre musicals, among other musicals, such as The Blue Paradise (1915) and Sometime (1918). In the 1920s, the theatre was the home of several hit operettas, particularly The Vagabond King and The Desert Song. Although the Casino had led the move uptown by the Broadway theatre district, by 1930, most of the theatres had moved even further north, to the West 40s. The last performance was the opera Faust presented by the American Opera Company on January 18, 1930 with tenor Charles Kullman in the title role and soprano Nancy McCord as Marguerite. The theatre was demolished a month later.

== Notable productions ==
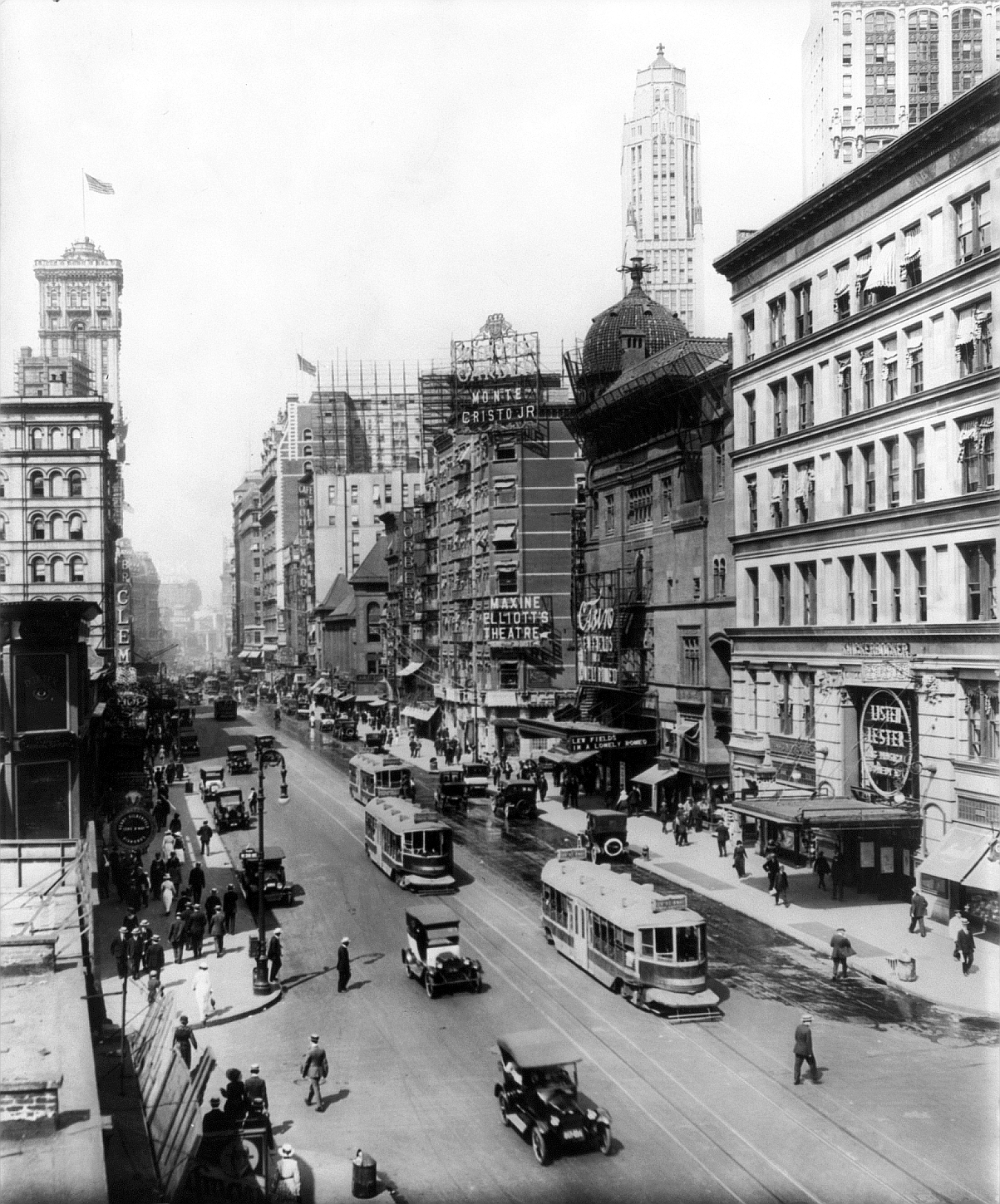
Broadway, 1920, looking north from 38th Street, showing the Casino and Knickerbocker Theatres, a sign pointing to Maxine Elliott's Theatre, which is out of view on 39th Street, and a sign advertising the Winter Garden Theatre, which is out of view on 50th Street. The old Metropolitan Opera House and the old Times Tower are visible on the left.

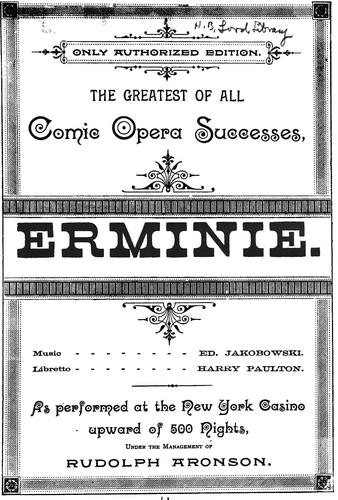
Title page of Erminie, noting its run at the theatre

- 1882: The Queen's Lace Handkerchief
- 1883: The Beggar Student
- 1884: Nell Gwynne
- 1885: Die Fledermaus
- 1886: Erminie
- 1888: The Yeomen of the Guard
- 1890: The Grand Duchess
- 1891: Cavalleria Rusticana
- 1894: The Passing Show
- 1895: The Wizard of the Nile
- 1896: The Lady Slavey
- 1896: In Gay New York
- 1897: The Belle of New York
- 1897: The Wedding Day
- 1898: Clorindy, or The Origin of the Cake Walk
- 1900: Little Red Riding Hood
- 1900: Florodora
- 1900: The Casino Girl
- 1900: The Belle of Bohemia
- 1901: The Little Duchess
- 1902: A Chinese Honeymoon
- 1903: The Runaways
- 1904: Piff! Paff!! Pouf!!!
- 1904: Baroness Fiddlesticks
- 1905: The Earl and the Girl
- 1909: Havana
- 1909: The Chocolate Soldier
- 1912: The Firefly
- 1912–13: Seasons of Gilbert and Sullivan
- 1914: High Jinks
- 1915: The Blue Paradise
- 1916: Very Good Eddie
- 1917: Oh, Boy!
- 1918: Oh, Lady! Lady!!
- 1918: Sometime
- 1921: Tangerine
- 1922: Sally, Irene and Mary
- 1923: Wildflower
- 1924: I'll Say She Is – Marx Brothers
- 1925: The Vagabond King
- 1926: The Desert Song
- 1928: My Maryland
- 1929: The New Moon
- 1930: American Opera Company's Madama Butterfly and Faust
- 1933: Melody
