= If I Were King (1920 film) =

1920 film by J. Gordon Edwards

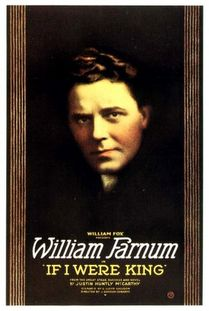
- 1929 theatrical poster
- Directed by: J. Gordon Edwards
- Written by: Justin Huntly McCarthy (novel & play); E. Lloyd Sheldon (scenario)
- Produced by: William Fox
- Starring: William Farnum; Betty Ross Clarke; Fritz Leiber, Sr.
- Cinematography: John W. Boyle
- Distributed by: Fox Film Corporation
- Release date: August 9, 1920
- Running time: 8 reels
- Country: United States
- Language: Silent (English intertitles)

If I Were King is a 1920 American silent drama film produced by Fox Film Corporation, directed by J. Gordon Edwards, and starring William Farnum as François Villon with Fritz Leiber, Sr. and Betty Ross Clarke.

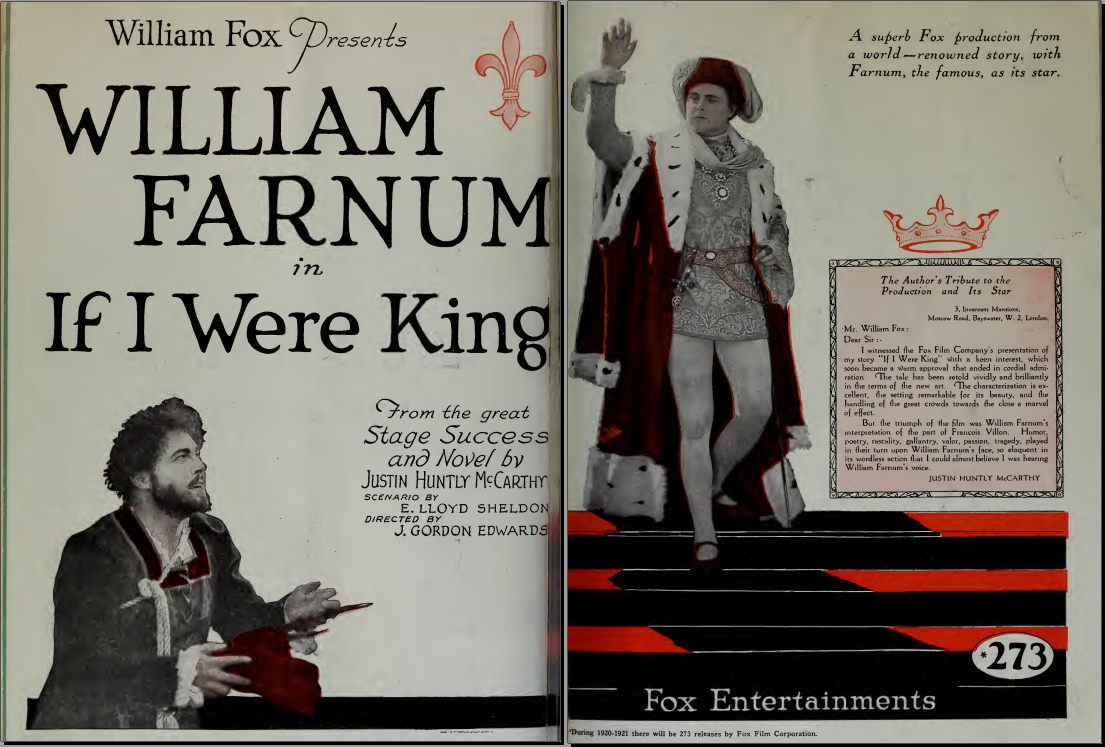
theatrical poster.

== Plot ==
The famed poet and vagabond rogue Francois Villon is by odd circumstances given the opportunity to rule France for a week. Adventure and intrigue ensue.

== Cast ==
- William Farnum as François Villon
- Betty Ross Clarke as Katherine
- Fritz Leiber Sr. as Louis XI
- Walter Law as Thibault
- Henry Carvill as Triestan
- Claude Payton as Montigney
- V.V. Clogg as Toison D'Or
- Harold Clairmont as Noel
- Renita Johnson as Huguette
- Kathryn Chase as Elizabeth

== Preservation status ==
A copy of the film is preserved in the Library of Congress. It is one of the few surviving J. Gordon Edwards films

== See also ==
- List of rediscovered films
