= Brian Hooker (poet) =

American poet (1880–1946)

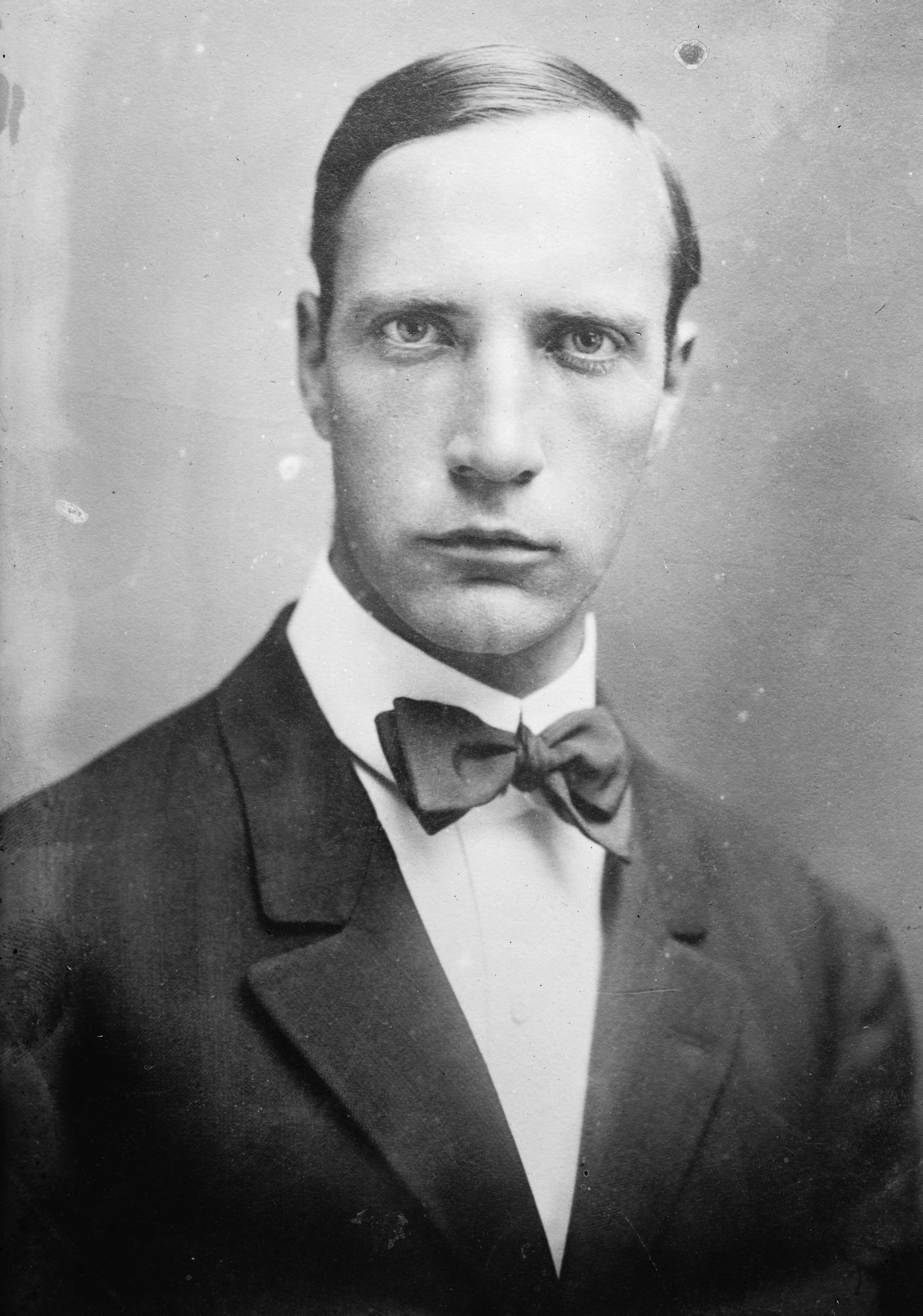
- Portrait of Hooker
- Born: William Brian Hooker; November 2, 1880; New York City
- Died: December 28, 1946 (aged 66); New London, Connecticut, U.S.
- Education: Yale University
- Occupations: Poet; playwright; novelist
- Known for: Cyrano de Bergerac (1923 translation); The Vagabond King (1925)
- Spouse: Doris Redfield Cooper
- Children: 3 daughters
- Parent(s): Elizabeth Work; William Augustus Hooker
- Relatives: Thomas Hooker (1586–1647)

William Brian Hooker (November 2, 1880 – December 28, 1946) was an American poet, educator, lyricist, and librettist. He was born in New York City, the son of Elizabeth Work and William Augustus Hooker, who was a mining engineer for the New York firm of Hooker and Lawrence. His family was well known in Hartford, Connecticut having descended from Thomas Hooker, a prominent Puritan religious and colonial leader who founded the Colony of Connecticut.

Hooker attended Yale College in the class of 1902, where he was a writer, editor and business manager for campus humor magazine The Yale Record. He was an editor of The Yale Record collection Yale Fun (1901). He died in New London, Connecticut, aged 66.

== Works ==
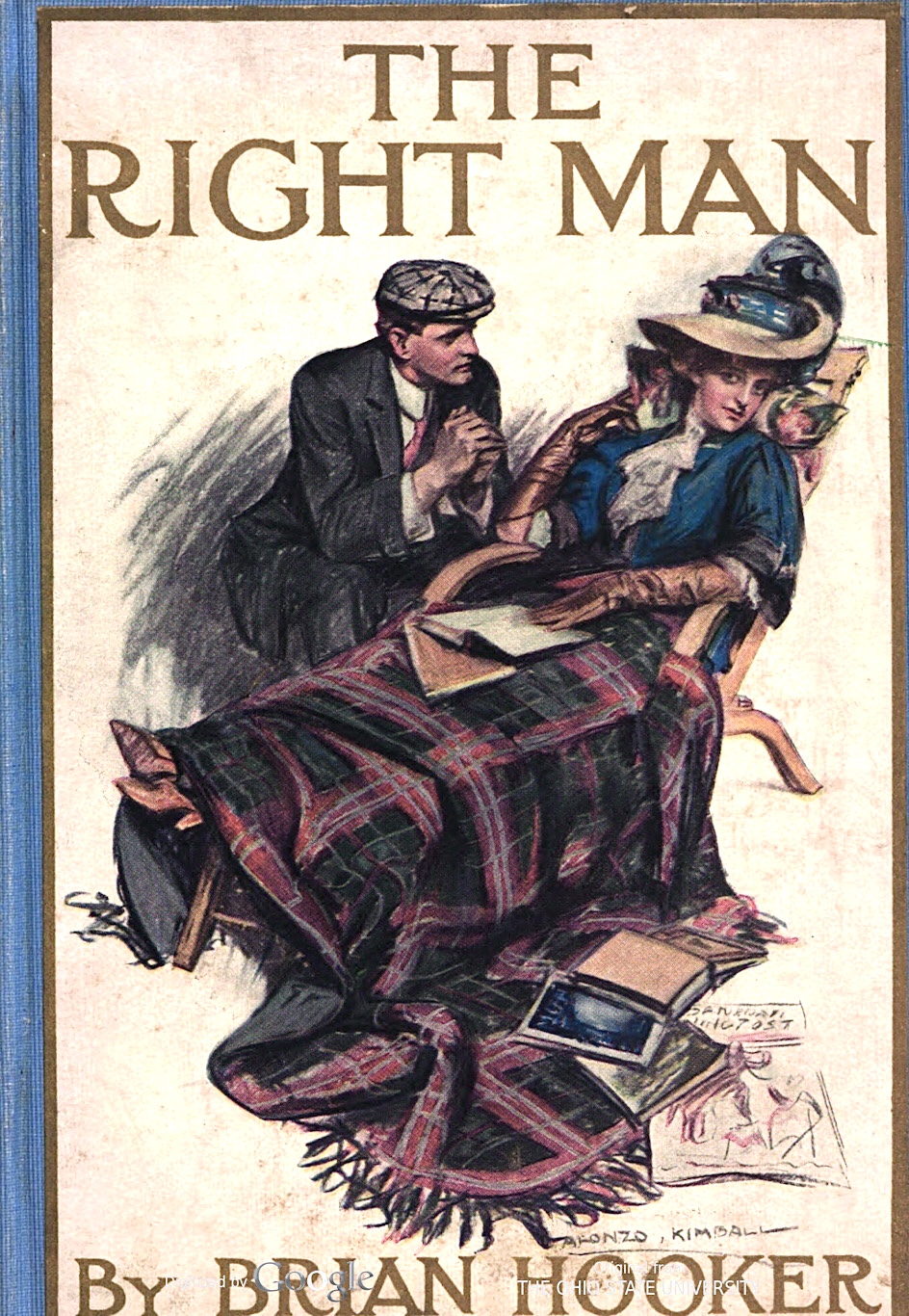
Cover of Hooker's 1908 novel The Right Man

Hooker published the novel The Right Man, illustrated by Alonzo Myron Kimball, in 1908. His poetry was published in The Century Magazine, The Forum, Hampton's Magazine, Harper's Magazine, McClure's Magazine, Scribner's Magazine, The Smart Set, and The Yale Review.

Hooker wrote the librettos for two operas by Horatio Parker, Mona (opera) and Fairyland. He co-wrote the libretto and lyrics for Rudolf Friml's 1925 operetta The Vagabond King, and is noted for his 1923 English translation of Edmond Rostand's Cyrano de Bergerac.
