= Rudolf Friml =

Czech composer (1879–1972)

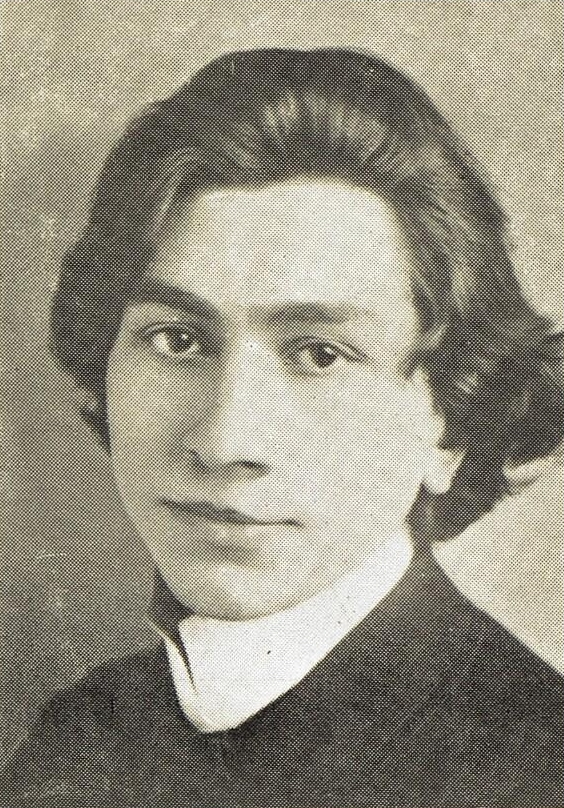
Rudolf Friml, 1905 Friml's signature

Charles Rudolf Friml (December 7, 1879 – November 12, 1972) was a Czech-born composer of operettas, musicals, songs and piano pieces, as well as a pianist. After musical training and a brief performing career in his native Prague, Friml moved to the United States, where he became a composer. His best-known works are Rose-Marie and The Vagabond King, both of which enjoyed success on Broadway and in London and were adapted for film.

== Early life ==
Friml was born Rudolf Antonín Frymel on December 2, 1879, in the Old Town 445, Prague, Bohemia (then part of the Austro-Hungarian Empire) and was baptized Roman Catholic at the Church of Saint Giles. Friml showed aptitude for music at an early age. He entered the Prague Conservatory in 1895, where he studied the piano and composition with Antonín Dvořák. Friml was expelled from the conservatory in 1901 for performing without permission. In Prague and soon afterwards in America he composed and published songs, piano pieces and other music, including the prize-winning set of songs, Písně Závišovy. The last of these, Za tichých nocí, later became the basis for a famous film in Nazi-occupied Czechoslovakia in 1941.

After the conservatory, Friml took a position as accompanist to the violinist Jan Kubelík. He toured with Kubelík twice in the United States (1901–02, 1904) and moved there permanently in 1906, apparently with the support of the Czech singer Emmy Destinn. His first regular post in New York was as a repetiteur at the Metropolitan Opera, but he had made his American piano debut at Carnegie Hall. On November 17, 1904, there, he gave the premiere of his Piano Concerto in B-flat major with the New York Symphony, under the baton of Walter Damrosch, in a concert that also included Friml playing his own Etude de concert, Op. 4, Smetana's "Am Seegestade", Liszt's Liebesträume No. 3, the Grieg A minor piano concerto with the orchestra, and a solo improvisation.

He later settled briefly in Los Angeles where he married Mathilde Baruch (in 1909). They had two children, Charles Rudolf Jr. (born 1910) and Marie Lucille (born 1911). His second marriage was to Blanch Betters, an actress who had appeared in the chorus of Friml's musical Katinka. His third marriage was to actress Elsie Lawson (who played the maid in Friml's Glorianna, and by whom he had a son, William). His fourth and final marriage was to Kay Wong Ling. The first three marriages ended in divorce.

== The Firefly and early operettas ==
In 1912, it was announced that operetta diva Emma Trentini would star in a new operetta on Broadway by veteran Victor Herbert and lyricist Otto Harbach titled The Firefly. Shortly before the composition of the operetta, Trentini appeared in a special performance of Herbert's Naughty Marietta conducted by Herbert himself. When Trentini refused to sing "Italian Street Song" for an encore, an enraged Herbert stormed out of the orchestra pit refusing any further work with Trentini. Arthur Hammerstein, the upcoming operetta's sponsor, frantically began to search for another composer. Not finding another theatre composer of comparable reputation to Herbert, Hammerstein settled on the almost unknown Friml because of his classical training. After a month of work, Friml produced the score for his first theatrical success.

After tryouts in Syracuse, New York, The Firefly opened at Broadway's Lyric Theatre on December 2, 1912, to a warm reception by both the audience and the critics. The production moved to the Casino Theatre after Christmas, where it ran until March 15, 1913, for a total of 120 performances. After The Firefly, Friml produced three more operettas that each had longer runs than The Firefly, although they are not as enduringly successful. These were High Jinks (1913), Katinka (1915) and You're in Love (1917). He also contributed songs to a musical in 1915, The Peasant Girl.

Trentini was named as a co-respondent in Friml's divorce from his first wife in 1915, and evidence was introduced that they were having an affair. Another show, Sometime, written with Rida Johnson Young and starring Ed Wynn and Mae West, ran successfully on Broadway in 1918–19.

== Success ==
Friml wrote his most successful operettas in the 1920s. In 1924, he wrote Rose-Marie. This operetta, on which Friml collaborated with lyricists Oscar Hammerstein II and Otto Harbach and co-composer Herbert Stothart, was a hit worldwide, and a few of the songs from it also became hits including "The Mounties" and "Indian Love Call". The use of murder as part of the plot was ground-breaking among operettas and musical theatre pieces at the time.

After Rose-Marie's success came two other hit operettas, The Vagabond King in 1925, with lyrics by Brian Hooker and William H. Post, and The Three Musketeers in 1928, with lyrics by P. G. Wodehouse and Clifford Grey, based on Alexandre Dumas's famous swashbuckling novel. In addition, Friml contributed to the Ziegfeld Follies of 1921 and 1923.

Friml wrote music for many films during the 1930s, often songs adapted from previous work. The Vagabond King, Rose-Marie and The Firefly were all made into films and included at least some of Friml's music. His operetta version of The Three Musketeers was never filmed. In 1930, he wrote a new operetta score for the film, The Lottery Bride. Like his contemporary, Ivor Novello, Friml was sometimes ridiculed for the sentimental and insubstantial nature of his compositions and was often called trite. Friml was also criticized for the old-fashioned, Old World sentiments found in his works. Friml's last stage musical was Music Hath Charms in 1934. During the 1930s, Friml's music fell out of fashion on Broadway and in Hollywood.

== Later years and legacy ==
In later years, Friml focused on playing the piano in concert and composing art music, which he did into his nineties. He also composed the music for the 1947 film Northwest Outpost. In 1967 at his concert at the Curran Theatre in San Francisco, he played Dvořák's Humoresque as a tribute to his teacher. He also appeared on Lawrence Welk's television program in 1971. He was one of the original inductees into the Songwriter's Hall of Fame.

His two sons also worked as musicians. Rudolf Jr. was a big band leader in the 1930s and 1940s, and William, a son from Friml's third marriage, was a composer and arranger in Hollywood. William married Shelby Payne after her divorce from actor Douglas Fowley. In 1969, Friml was celebrated by Ogden Nash on the occasion of his 90th birthday in a couplet which ended: "I trust your conclusion and mine are similar: 'Twould be a happier world if it were Frimler." Similarly, satiric songwriter Tom Lehrer made a reference to Friml on his first album, Songs by Tom Lehrer (1953). The song "The Wiener Schnitzel Waltz" includes the lyric, "Your lips were like wine (if you'll pardon the simile) / The music was lovely, and quite Rudolf Friml-y." Near the end of the 1957 musical The Music Man, Harold Hill lies to Marian Paroo: "I'm expecting a telegram from Rudy Friml, and this could be it."

Friml died in Los Angeles in 1972 and was interred in the "Court of Honor" at Forest Lawn Memorial Park in Glendale, California. On August 18, 2007, a death notice in the San Francisco Chronicle reported that Kay Wong Ling Friml (born March 16, 1913), Friml's last wife, died on August 9, 2007, and would be buried with him in Forest Lawn.

Friml's works that have seen revivals on Broadway include a 1943 production of The Vagabond King and a 1984 production of The Three Musketeers. "The Donkey Serenade" from the film version of The Firefly, "The Mounties" and "Indian Love Call" are still frequently heard, often in romantic parody or comic situations. His piano music is also often performed. In Japan, Friml is known for "Song of the Vagabonds" from The Vagabond King, where Keizō Horiuchi adapted it for Shochiku, and it was later used in the 1982 film Fall Guy. Variations of the song using Friml's instrumentation, are still being performed today, including by the Takarazuka Revue.

== Works ==
- Písně Závišovy (1906) and other songs
- The Firefly (1912)
- High Jinks (1913)
- The Peasant Girl (1914, originally titled The Ballet Girl) – contributor
- Katinka (1915)
- You're in Love (1917)
- Kitty Darlin' (1917)
- Sometime (1918)
- Glorianna (1918)
- Sometime (1918)
- Tumble In (1919)
- The Little Whopper (1919)
- June Love (1921)
- Ziegfeld Follies of 1921 – contributor
- The Blue Kitten (1922)
- Bibi of the Boulevards (1922)
- Cinders (1923)
- Dew Drop Inn (1923) – contributor
- Ziegfeld Follies of 1923 – contributor
- Rose-Marie (1924)
- The Vagabond King (1925)
- Ziegfeld's Revue "No Foolin'" (1926)
- The Wild Rose (1926)
- White Eagle (1927)
- The Three Musketeers (1928)
- The Lottery Bride (1930 film)
- Luana (1930)
- Music Hath Charms (1934)
- Northwest Outpost (1947 film)
