= Catherine (1986 TV series) =

1986 French television series based on the novels by Juliette Benzoni

- Genre: Historical romance Historical fiction Drama; Soap opera
- Based on: Catherine, il suffit d'un amour by Juliette Benzoni
- Screenplay by: Juliette Benzoni; Jean Chatenet
- Directed by: Marion Sarraut
- Starring: See cast below
- Narrated by: Bernard Dhéran
- Music by: Robert Viger (Éditions des Alouettes)
- Country of origin: France
- Original language: French
- No. of episodes: 60 (TV version); 30 (DVD version)

Production
- Producer: Henri Spade
- Running time: 26 minutes (TV version); 52 minutes (DVD version)
- Production company: SFP

Original release
- Network: Antenne 2
- Release: 19 March – 11 June 1986

Catherine, il suffit d'un amour is a French television series produced by Antenne 2 in 1986 and based on the Catherine novels written by best-selling French author Juliette Benzoni. The adaptation remained similar to the original text of Juliette Benzoni's story about Catherine and her adventures in France during the 15th century.

The screenplay was written by Benzoni with Jean Chatenet, and directed by Marion Sarraut. Sarraut had previously directed another of Benzoni's best-selling novel series Marianne with Corinne Touzet who starred in the leading role.

== Plot summary ==
The story takes place in the time of the Armagnac-Burgundian Civil War, a conflict which occurred during a lull in the Hundred Years' War. John the Fearless, Duke of Burgundy, is locked in a struggle against the Armagnacs who support the future King Charles VII. During the Parisian riots of 1413, Catherine Legoix, the 13-year-old daughter of a goldsmith living on the Pont-au-Change, tries to save a young Armagnac knight, 16-year old Michel de Montsalvy. He is to be executed because he spat at Duke John and called him a traitor. Catherine hides Michel in the family's cellar, but he and her father are murdered by a paternal cousin. Catherine and her mother flee to Dijon to the home of her maternal uncle, Mathieu Gautherin. They are accompanied by Sara the Black, a young gypsy who hid the women in a slum area of Paris.

Catherine's attempt to save Michel de Montsalvy has changed her life. At the age of twenty-one, she is a beautiful woman. At this point, she meets a wounded knight, the noble Arnaud de Montsalvy who is one of Joan of Arc's captains and the late Michel de Montsalvy's younger brother. After Catherine and Arnaud fall in love, Arnaud discovers that one of Catherine's family members killed his older brother. He wishes to avenge his brother's death by killing Catherine, but tells her he will not do so because she is a woman. Her beauty attracts the attention of Duke Philip the Good who desires her. He orders his treasurer, Garin de Brazey, to marry Catherine so she can be received at court despite her low birth.

Because Catherine believes Arnaud is to marry Isabelle de Sévérac, she agrees to be the mistress of the powerful Duke who showers her with titles and riches. At the Duke's courts in Dijon and Bruges, Catherine meets important historical figures such as Flemish painter Jan van Eyck, Jean Lefèvre de Saint-Rémy, Gilles de Rais, Jacques Cœur, and Yolande d'Aragon. After Catherine's four-year-old son Philippe de Brazey dies, she discovers Arnaud de Montsalvy never married. Because is still in love with him, she travels to the beleaguered city of Orléans where Arnaud and the other captains of Joan of Arc are fighting against the English. In Orléans, Catherine's life is saved by Joan of Arc after Catherine has been condemned to death for treason.

After enduring many dangerous adventures, Catherine finds happiness. She becomes the beloved wife of Arnaud de Montsalvy, Lord of the Châtaignerie in Auvergne and Captain in the service of King Charles VII.

== Cast ==
=== Main characters ===
- Claudine Ancelot : Catherine Legoix / Catherine de Montsalvy
- Pierre-Marie Escourrou : Michel de Montsalvy / Arnaud de Montsalvy
- Pascale Petit : Black Sara
- Nicole Maurey : Isabelle de Montsalvy
- Anne Lefébure : Jacquette Legoix
- Henri Guybet : Gaucher Legoix
- Christian Alers : Mathieu Gautherin
- Philippe Clay : Barnaby of the Cockleshell
- Jean-François Poron : Duke Philip of Burgundy
- Stéphane Bouy : Garin de Brazey / Spanish monk
- Dora Doll : Ermengarde de Châteauvillain
- Jacques Duby : Brother Étienne
- Amidou : Abou-al-Khayr
- Geneviève Casile : Queen Yolande of Aragon
- Gérard Chambre : Jean Poton de Xaintrailles
- Philippe Murgier : Jacques Cœur

=== Supporting characters ===
- Isabelle Guiard : Joan of Arc
- Pierre Deny : Jean de Dunois
- Benoît Brione : Gilles de Rais
- Georges Montillier : Bishop Cauchon
- Marthe Mercadier : Mathilde Boucher
- Jacques Brucher : Jacques de Roussay
- Daniel Tarrare : Jean de Luxembourg
- François Brincourt : Arthur III, Duke of Brittany
- Stéphane Fey : Tristan l'Hermite
- Michel Duplaix : Raoul de Gaucourt
- Christian Rauth : Fero, Gypsy Lord
- Philippe Caroit : Pierre de Brézé
- Michel Peyleron : Georges de la Trémoille
- Lena Grinda : Catherine de la Trémoille
- Marie Daëms : Anne de Sillé
- Sylvain Lemarié : Abbot Bernard
- Rebecca Potok : Gauberte Cairou
- Philippe Nahon : Fortunat
- Hervé Pauchon : Gauthier de Chazay
- Hugues Profy : Bérenger de Roquemaurel
- Virginie Pradal : Margot
- Anne-Marie Scieller : Marie de Comborn
- Bernard Ortega : Rodrigo de Villandrando
- James Sparrow : Sir Hugh Kennedy of Ardstinchar
- Patrice Alexsandre : Robert Ier de Sarrebruck-Commercy
- Jean-Claude Aubé : King René d'Anjou
- Julie Odekerken Sarraut : Agnès Sorel
- Bénédicte Sire : Azalaïs the lacemaker
- Corinne Touzet : Princess Zobeïda
- Marc Samuel : Josse Rallard
- Clément Michu : Maître Gaspard Cornelis
- Philippe Auriault : Landry Pigasse
- Serge Marquard : Simon Caboche
- Sylvie Folgoas : Michelle de France

== Production ==
The television series was a co-production involving Antenne 2 (succeeded by France 2) and SFP within its producer of the series was Henri Spade. After following the success of the Marianne series – which aired on 21 November 1983 – Spade supported the new project Catherine, il suffit d'un amour.

=== Conception and development ===
In the press review in 1983 for Marianne, une étoile pour Napoléon, Benzoni writes: "Thanks go to Marion Sarraut, director after my heart... provided with a heart, sensibility and talent, a great artistic sense and an astonishingly safe flair to choose interpreters".

In the weekly television listings magazine Télé Star said: "I do not want a director other than Marion". Sarraut and Benzoni had a great admiration both for each other as well as Jean Chatenet wrote the screenplay. Filming began in 1985 of Catherine, il suffit d'un amour after only two years of preparation under the direction by Sarraut. The production had a total of 200 actors, 1,500 costumes, 45 technicians and 130 horses.

The horses were trained by Mario Luraschi, horse trainer and stuntman both for French and international cinema.

=== Casting ===
For the male leading role, Sarraut said that Pierre-Marie Escourrou did not correspond at first to the idea of the personality she had in mind – however after his audition she knew that she had found the perfect Arnaud de Montsalvy. The yet unknown young actress Claudine Ancelot was the perfect Catherine de Montsalvy.

As a special bonus, popular French actors and actresses were engaged to play cameo roles in Catherine. The cast was joined by Geneviève Casile of the Comédie-Française, Jean-François Poron, Philippe Clay, Pascale Petit and Dora Doll.

=== Filming ===
The shooting of the television series lasted for 15 months. The indoor scenes were shot at the Buttes-Chaumont SFP studios in Paris, and the outdoor scenes were filmed on location in Burgundy, Chaumont, Blois, Auvergne, Château de Sully-sur-Loire, Villefranche-de-Conflent, and Le prieuré de Marcevol. The oldest quarters of the city at Castelnou in the Pyrenees served as Montsalvy, the home of Catherine and Arnaud. Scenes set at the Alhambra in Granada were shot at the castle of the Kings of Majorca in Perpignan.

=== Music ===
The music was composed by Robert Viger who had already composed several soundtracks such as Les Amours romantiques for a French television series. In 1983, Viger had composed the television soundtrack for the successful Marianne. Juliette Benzoni's Marianne, une étoile pour Napoléon (six books) was the first of the novel series filmed for French television.

== Critical reception ==
On 19 March 1986, Catherine, il suffit d'un amour was proclaimed "the largest soap opera ever created in France". It was broadcast at 13:30 CET each afternoon during the week. Several critics praised the lavish scale of the production, comparing it to popular American television soaps such as Dynasty and Dallas.

The daily newspaper Le Monde wrote: "A soap opera? Certainly! But with panache. It is clear that the actors really go for broke. And it's contagious… why not?"

In Poland, the 1986 television series was shown on TVP1 from 2 April to 9 July 1989. It was known as the Polish title Katarzyna, and it contained a total of 15 episodes which ran approximately 90 minutes each.

== Home media ==
In December 2007, the French book sales club France Loisirs released the entire series on DVD with the complete collection consisting of five boxes in ten discs. The covers of the DVD boxes displayed images from the 1986 television series, but there were no English subtitles, special features, nor extra elements included.

Eventually, the DVD version of the television series – originally consisting of 60 episodes and 26 minutes – were reduced to 30 episodes of 52 minutes each.

== See also ==
- Cultural depictions of Joan of Arc
- France in the Middle Ages
- Middle Ages in popular culture
- 1986 in French television
