= Loys =

Loys, Loÿs, Loyse or Loysé is a given name which may refer to:

== People ==
- Loys of Gruuthuse (c. 1422–1492), better known as Lewis de Bruges, lord of Gruuthuse
- Loys Louis Bourgeois (composer) (c. 1510–1559), French composer and music theorist
- Loys Choquart (1920–1989), Swiss jazz reedist, bandleader, and broadcaster
- Loysé Youth Deal, birth name of Borden Deal (1922–1985), American novelist and short story writer
- Loÿs Delteil (1869–1927), French engraver, lithographer, illustrator, and art historian
- Loÿs Papon (1533–1599), French playwright

== Fictional characters ==
- Loys, in the ballet Giselle
- Loyse, in the opera La Belle au bois dormant
- Loyse, in the novel Witch World
- Loyse, sister of the title character of the novel Catherine

== See also ==
- François de Loys (1892–1935), Swiss oil geologist and discoverer of "De Loys's ape", a misidentified alleged species or hoax
- Charles Guillaume Loys de Bochat (1695–1754), Swiss jurist, historian and antiquarian
- Jean-Philippe Loys de Cheseaux (1718–1751), Swiss astronomer
- Loys Station Covered Bridge, Maryland, United States, on the National Register of Historic Places
