= Montsalvy Abbey =

Former Benedictine monastery in Montsalvy, France

- Abbaye de Montsalvy
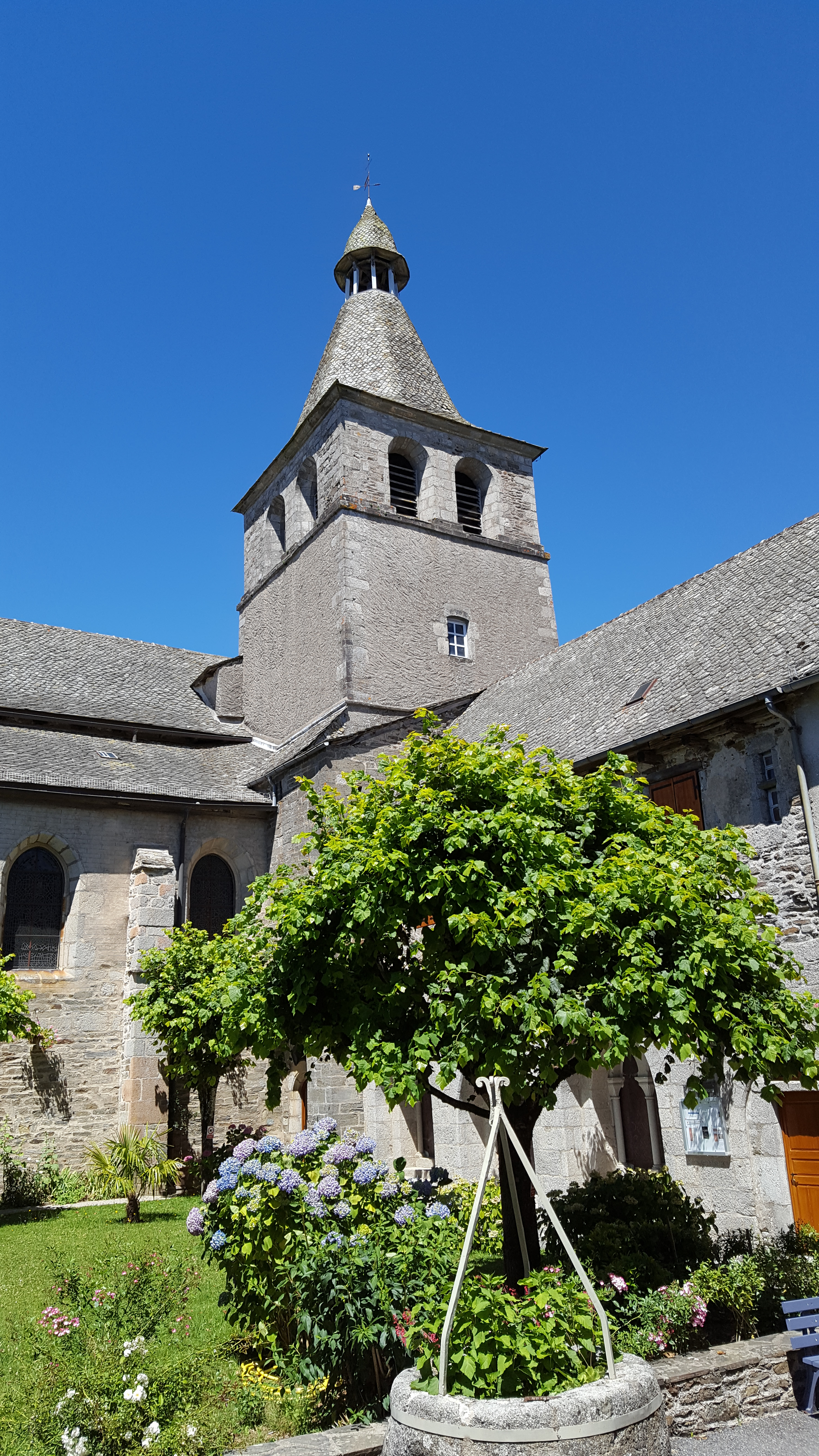
- View of the former Montsalvy Abbey and its bell tower, from the cloister

Religion
- Affiliation: Roman Catholic
- Province: Diocese of Saint-Flour
- Ecclesiastical or organisational status: church
- Status: Active

Location
- Location: Montsalvy, France
- Interactive map of Montsalvy Abbey
- Coordinates: 44°42′25″N 2°30′03″E

Architecture
- Style: Romanesque

Montsalvy Abbey (French: Abbaye de Montsalvy; Abbaye Notre-Dame de l'Assomption de Montsalvy) is a former Benedictine monastery located in Montsalvy, in the French departement of Cantal. It is now the Roman Catholic parish church of the village.

== History ==
The original complex of buildings was built in the 11th century, according to Saint Gausbert's wishes. The monastery stood to the south of the church, around the current "place du cloître" (cloister) which was closed by the chapter house. A dwelling towards the east was also closed down. The refectory is still standing and located south of the former cloister. What remains currently of the dwelling is only the presbytery.

The dependencies were registered in the "titre des monuments historiques" (the regional level of importance for objects or buildings in France) in 1942. The church, the chapter house, and the refectory were classified as "monuments historiques" in 1982 (national level of importance for objects or buildings).

== Description ==
The former abbey church is a building of Romanesque style including a nave, two aisles, a transept, and three apse chapels. The outside aspect of the building was redesigned during the 17th century.

The other surviving buildings on the site include a chapter room that accommodates a permanent exhibition of valuable liturgical objects and a wooden medieval statue of Jesus Christ.
