= Papon =

Papon may refer to:

- Christiane Papon (1924–2023), French politician
- Jean-Pierre Papon (1734–1803), French abbot and historian
- Loÿs Papon (1533–1599), French playwright
- Maurice Papon (1910–2007), French politician
- Monique Papon (1934–2018), French politician
- Nazmul Hassan Papon (born 1961), Bangladeshi politician
- Papon (singer) (born 1975), stage name of Angaraag Mahanta, Indian singer from Assam
