= Philippe Clay =

French actor (1927–2007)

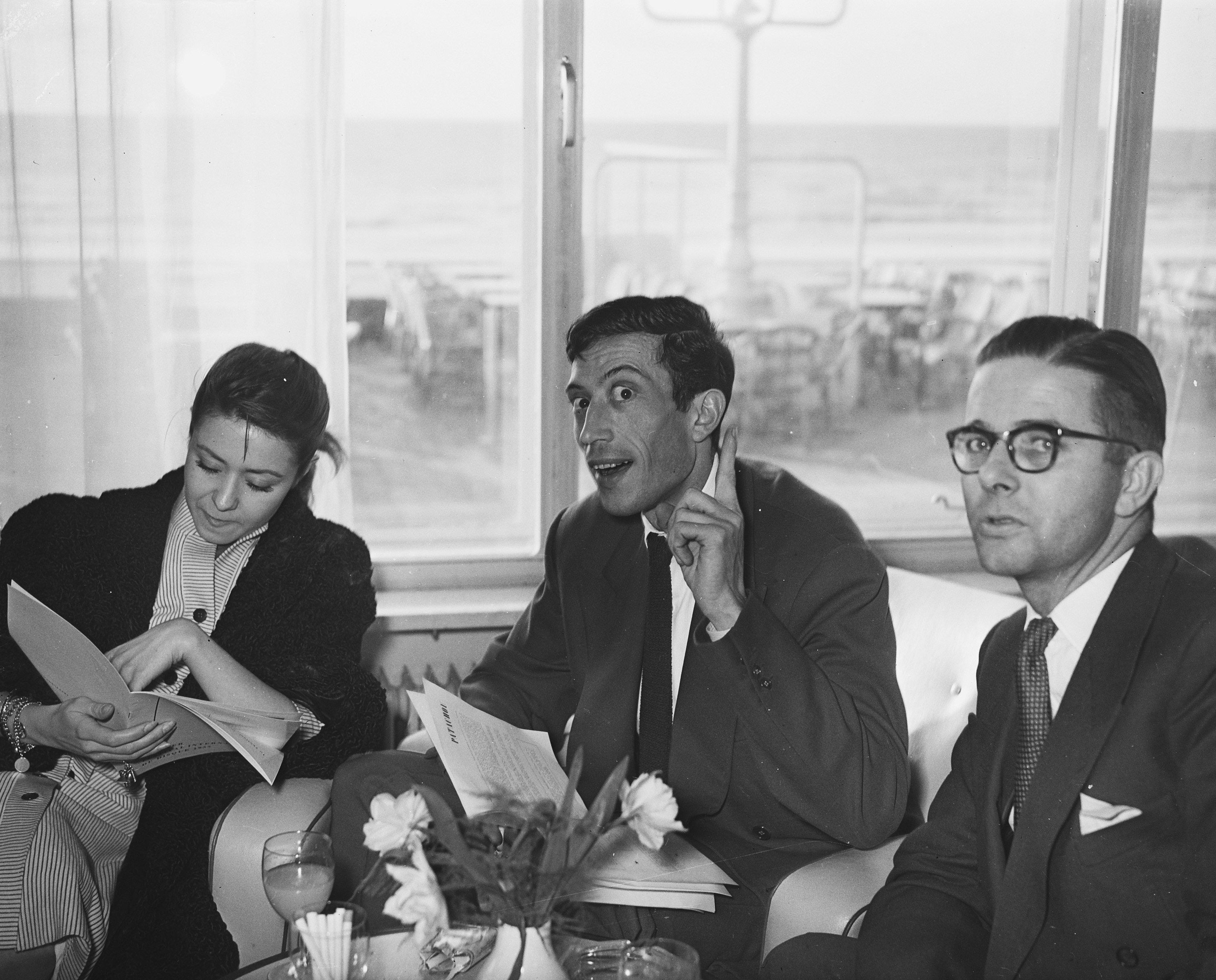
Clay (middle) in 1955

Philippe Mathevet (7 March 1927 – 13 December 2007), known professionally as Philippe Clay, was a French mime artist, singer, and actor.

He was known for his tall and slim silhouette—he was 1.90 m (6 ft 3 in) tall—and for performing songs by Charles Aznavour, Claude Nougaro, Jean-Roger Caussimon, Boris Vian, Serge Gainsbourg, Jean Yanne, Léo Ferré, Jacques Datin, Jean-Claude Massoulier or Bernard Dimey. He sang “La Complainte des Apaches” for the TV series The Tiger Brigades, written by Henri Djian and composed by Claude Bolling.

As an actor, he appeared in several films (Bell, Book and Candle) and television films. One of his famous roles is in the Jean Renoir film French Cancan, where he played Casimir le Serpentin (a character inspired by Valentin le désossé). His largest role in an American film was in Shanks, making particular use of his mime background co-starring with the master mime Marcel Marceau (as Marceau's brother-in-law who spends much of the film re-animated from the dead as a pantomime figure, moving like a marionette).

== Early life ==
Born in the 14th arrondissement of Paris (Gare Montparnasse area), Philippe is the son of Gustave Mathevet and his wife, Marthe Jeannot, originally from Auvergne. He is a student at a school run by the Brothers of the Christian Schools.

During World War II, the family took refuge in Auvergne. In 1943, at the age of 16, he joined a resistance group.

After the Liberation (1944), he enlisted in the French army and fought up to Germany. It was then that he discovered his talent for acting, entertaining his comrades with small performances.

Upon his return to France, he decided to make it his profession. His mother enrolled him in the National Conservatory of Dramatic Art, where he learned voice projection and the art of mime. He was cast in roles as a tall, lanky character. He was eventually expelled for indiscipline.

== Career ==
He performed in several plays at the Théâtre de Chaillot.

In 1949, almost despite himself—as friends had signed him up without his knowledge—Philippe won the "Espoirs et Vedettes 49" singing contest held at the Parisian bar "À la colonne de la Bastille." His performance was convincing enough that he was offered a tour in Normandy under the name "Phil Clay," chosen by the producer, which was later adapted to "Philippe Clay."

He was then offered a show in Morocco. He went to the Raoul Breton publishing house and set off on tour with "a suitcase full of songs," including several by Charles Aznavour, who was still relatively unknown. He spent the next three years in French North Africa (Morocco, Algeria, Tunisia).

He returned to Paris in 1953 and performed at Les Trois Baudets and La Fontaine des Quatre Saisons. During this period, he frequented the jazz cellars of Saint-Germain-des-Prés and became friends with Jacques Prévert, Boris Vian, and Serge Gainsbourg.

From 1957 to 1962, he headlined four times at the Olympia, did numerous tours abroad, and achieved his greatest successes with songs like Les Voyous, Festival d'Aubervilliers, and Le Danseur de Charleston.

In 1964, he performed a few duets with Serge Gainsbourg.

In film, he portrayed Casimir the Serpentine (a character evoking Valentin the Boneless) in Jean Renoir's French Cancan and Clopin, the leader of the Court of Miracles, in Jean Delannoy's Notre-Dame de Paris.

From 1966 onward, he appeared in numerous TV films, particularly those by Jean Kerchbron, Jean-Christophe Averty, Jean Delannoy, Édouard Molinaro, Marion Sarraut, Josée Dayan, and Franck Appréderis, among others, and starred alongside Carlos in the series Le JAP.

After a career slump, he made a comeback in 1971 with songs like Mes Universités and La Quarantaine, in response to the May '68 movement. This anti-establishment repertoire marked him politically to the right, and in the following decade, he joined the RPR, a party founded by Jacques Chirac.

In 1975, he starred in Monte-Cristo, a musical by Eddy Marnay with music by Michel Legrand. This production, staged at the Théâtre des Champs-Élysées and directed by Maurice Jacquemont, did not meet the anticipated success.

He is also known for his performance of La Complainte des Apaches, the theme song for the series The Tiger Brigades, orchestrated by Claude Bolling.

Philippe Clay also sang Marseille, Le Cerisier de ma maison, Je t'aime, and others.

== Personal life ==
He was married to actress Maria Riquelme (1930–2019). They had three children: Patricia, Xavier, and Philippe, the latter of whom died in 1992.

He owned the Château de Villiers in Cerny (Essonne) as well as the Cité Monthiers in the 9th arrondissement of Paris.

== Death ==
Philippe Clay died of a heart attack on December 13, 2007 at his residence in Issy-les-Moulineaux, at the age of 80.

His funeral took place on December 19 at the crematorium of Père-Lachaise Cemetery (20th arrondissement of Paris), where he was cremated. The ceremony was attended by several figures from the entertainment world, including singers Charles Aznavour and Marcel Amont, actors Smaïn and Ginette Garcin, as well as the mayor of Issy-les-Moulineaux and former deputy André Santini. His ashes were later scattered at a family home in Brittany.

He was survived by his wife, actress María Riquelme, and their son.

== Discography ==
=== Studio albums ===
- 1954 : La Goualante du pauvre Jean
- Los Dictatorios
- 1954 : Le Noyé assassiné
- 1954 : Moi j'fais mon rond
- 1956 : Philippe Clay (Le Danseur de charleston)
- 1957 : Cigarettes, Whisky et P'tites Pépées
- 1958 : Stances de Ronsard (Pierre de Ronsard/Léo Ferré)
- 1960 : Philippe Clay (L'Homme de l'équateur)
- 1961 : La Dolce Vita- 45 Tours Fontana 261.152 MF
- 1961 : Philippe Clay – Bleu, blanc, rouge – Epic LF 2018 – Canada
- 1971 : Philippe Clay (Mes universités) – 33 Tours Polydor 2473 003
- 1973 : Philippe Clay (Au volant de ma valse) – 33 tours Polydor 2473 020
- 1975 : Philippe Clay (Marie la France) – Polydor 2056 326
- 1974 : Philippe Clay – La Complainte des apaches – Polydor 2056 378 – Canada
- 1975 : Monte Cristo – 33 tours Polydor 2473 054
- 1976 : Trop c'est trop – Polydor 2056 578
- 1977 : Le temps du troc – Polydor 2056 619
- 1977 : Clay 78 – 33 Tours Eurodisc WEA 913 158
- 1978 : C'était hier – Eurodisc 913 220
- 1978 : La Question – Eurodisc WEA 911 193
- 1980 : Attendez – 33 Tours Arabella 201 754
- 1980 : Mon pays, la Marseillaise – 45 Tours Philips 813 175-7
- 1982 : Philippe Clay (La Route de la vie) – 33 Tours Polydor – 2393 344

==== Compilations ====
- 1999 : 50 ans de carrière, 50 chansons – 2 CD RYM Musique 1970752 UN 865, P

=== Live performance ===
- 1957 : À l'Olympia

== Filmography ==
Year	Title	Role	Notes
1950	Rome Express	Un employé des wagons-lits	
1952	Le crime du Bouif		
1955	French Cancan	Casimir le Serpentin	
1956	La vie est belle	Le pasteur	
1956	The Hunchback of Notre Dame	Clopin Trouillefou	
1957	C'est arrivé à 36 chandelles	Himself	Uncredited
1957	Nathalie	Adolphe Faisant, dit "Coco la Girafe"	
1958	En bordée	Bailladrisse / Yves Biadrix	
1958	Toto in Paris	Il maître d'hotel	
1958	Bell, Book and Candle	French Singer at the Zodiac Club	
1959	Drôles de phénomènes	La maître d'hôtel Barns	
1959	The Road to Shame	Tom	
1959	The Bureaucrats	Letondu	
1959	La Nuit des traqués	Taretta	
1960	Les Canailles	Carlo Sarotti	
1960	Touchez pas aux blondes	L'inspecteur Al Wheeler	
1961	Dans l'eau qui fait des bulles	Jean-Louis Preminger	Voice
1962	Musketeers of the Sea	Gosselin	
1965	The Man from Cocody	Renaud Lefranc	
1966	Sale temps pour les mouches	Pierre Mazaud, dit 'Félix'	
1967	Les têtes brûlées	Prêcheur	
1970	Pour un sourire	Nicolas	
1971	Armiamoci e partite!	Generale McMaster	
1972	Not Dumb, The Bird	Jack Bromfield	
1972	Les joyeux lurons	L'abbé Larivière	
1973	L'insolent	Dargnac	
1974	The Three Musketeers	Richelieu	Voice
1974	Shanks	Mr. Barton	
1982	Deux heures moins le quart avant Jésus-Christ	Le héraut	
1983	Salut la puce	Rigodo-Cartecolin, un marionnettiste	
1983	A Good Little Devil	Le juge	
1986	Catherine	Barnabé	TV series
1993	Die Wildnis	Peasant	
1995	Krim	Eugène	
1995	La Rivière Espérance	Majordome	TV mini-series
1998	Les cachetonneurs	The Aristocrat	
1998	Lautrec	Auguste Renoir	
1999	Tuvalu	Karl	
2003	Là-haut, un roi au-dessus des nuages	L'aumônier de Saint-Louis-des-Invalides	
