= Alex North =

American composer (1910–1991)

Background information
- Born: Isadore Soifer; December 4, 1910; Chester, Pennsylvania, U.S.
- Died: September 8, 1991 (aged 80) Los Angeles, California
- Genres: Film score; theatre; classical rock; jazz rock
- Occupation: Composer
- Relatives: Joseph North (brother)

Alex North (born Isadore Soifer; December 4, 1910 – September 8, 1991) was an American composer best known for his many film scores, including A Streetcar Named Desire (one of the first jazz-based film scores), Viva Zapata!, Spartacus, Cleopatra, and Who's Afraid of Virginia Woolf?. He received fifteen Academy Award nominations for his work as a composer; while he did not win for any of his nominations, he received an Honorary Academy Award in 1986, the first for a composer.

He wrote the music for the Oscar-nominated song "Unchained Melody", which was used in the 1955 prison film Unchained. The song became a standard and one of the most recorded of the 20th century, with over 1,500 recordings made by more than 670 artists, in multiple languages.

== Early life and education ==
North was born Isadore Soifer in Chester, Pennsylvania, to Jewish parents Jesse and Beila (Bessie). They had emigrated from the Russian Empire to the U.S. around 1906. His father was originally from Bila Tserkva and his mother from Odessa (both cities are now in Ukraine). In Chester, his father worked as a blacksmith and skilled mechanic, and his mother ran a small grocery store. In 1915 his father died on the operating table during surgery for appendicitis, leaving his mother with financial hardships. In the late 1920s, Isadore's older brother Jacob began writing articles for radical labor publications. To shield his family from political peril, Jacob adopted the pseudonym "Joseph North". Soon the family followed his lead, and Isadore Soifer became Alex North.

North began studying the piano at a young age in Chester with a mediocre instructor with bad technique. At the age of nine he switched to a better teacher, William Hatton Green, who grounded him in Theodor Leschetizky's method of piano pedagogy over a three year period of study. At this time he befriended Samuel Barber who was also a student in Green's studio. At the age of 12 he began more rigorous music studies at the Settlement Music School (SMS) where he studied piano for four years under George Frederick Boyle. He also participated in a masterclass with Leopold Godowsky during his time at SMS.

While a student at Chester High School (CHS), North worked as a telegraph operator to help pay for music studies, and assist the family's finances. He graduated from CHS in 1927, and then studied at the Curtis Institute of Music in 1928–1929. Under Boyle's recommendation he transferred to the Juilliard School, after successfully auditioning for Frank Damrosch in 1929. He attended Juilliard on a four year full scholarship, but only completed three years of study with the intimidation of the senior piano recital leading him to drop out in 1932 without completing his degree. At Juilliard he remained a piano student of Boyle, and also studied music composition and theory with Bernard Wagenaar. He spent two years studying composition at the Moscow Conservatory (1933–1935), while working as a telegraph operator.

North later studied privately for a year in Mexico with composer Silvestre Revueltas in the late 1930s; pursuing his passion for Mexican music.

== War service and career ==
In 1932 North befriended dancer and choreographer Anna Sokolow who had a profound impact in orienting his career towards music composition. He worked as the rehearsal pianist for her dance group, and through her encouragement and persuasion, he began composing music for her dancers. This set him on the path of a career as a composer. His first major composition was the Anti-War Trilogy (later part of the Anti-War Series) which he composed for Sokolow's dance troupe.

In the Second World War, Alex served as a captain in the U.S. Army Special Services division from 1942 to 1946. There, he was responsible for "self-entertainment" programs in mental hospitals. He also composed music for more than twenty-six documentary films for the Office of War Information. While in the service, he wrote the score for the documentary short, A Better Tomorrow (1945).

North managed to integrate his modernism into typical film music leitmotif structure, rich with themes. One of these became the famous song "Unchained Melody". Nominated for fifteen Oscars but unsuccessful each time, North is the first of only four film composers to receive the Lifetime Achievement Academy Award, the others being Ennio Morricone, Lalo Schifrin and Quincy Jones. North's frequent collaborator as orchestrator was the avant-garde composer Henry Brant. He won the 1968 Golden Globe award for his music to The Shoes of the Fisherman (1968).

His best-known film scores include A Streetcar Named Desire, Death of a Salesman, Viva Zapata!, The Rainmaker, Spartacus, The Misfits, Cleopatra, Who's Afraid of Virginia Woolf?, Dragonslayer and Under the Volcano. His music for The Wonderful Country makes use of Mexican and American motifs.

His commissioned score for 2001: A Space Odyssey (1968) is notorious for having been discarded by director Stanley Kubrick late in the production process. Although North subsequently incorporated motifs from the rejected score for The Shoes of the Fisherman, Shanks and Dragonslayer, the score itself remained unheard until composer Jerry Goldsmith re-recorded it for Varèse Sarabande in 1993. In 2007, Intrada Records released the 1968 recording sessions on CD from North's personal archives.

North was also commissioned to write a jazz score for Nero Wolfe, a 1959 CBS-TV series based on Rex Stout's Nero Wolfe characters, starring William Shatner as Archie Goodwin and Kurt Kasznar as Nero Wolfe. A pilot and two or three episodes were filmed, but the designated time slot was, in the end, given to another series. North's unheard score for Nero Wolfe and six recorded tracks on digital audio tape are in the UCLA Music Library Special Collections. He wrote the music for various other TV shows, such as the anthologies Climax! and Playhouse 90.

Though North is best known for his work in Hollywood, he spent years in New York writing music for the stage; he composed the score for the original Broadway production of Death of a Salesman. It was in New York that he met Elia Kazan (director of Salesman), who brought him to Hollywood in the 1950s. North stopped working with Kazan after Kazan's 1952 testimony to the House Un-American Activities Committee. In the 1950s North was unable to work in Hollywood for several years because of suspected communist affiliations.

North was one of several composers who merged the sound of contemporary concert music into film, in part marked by an increased use of dissonance and complex rhythms. But there is also a lyrical quality to much of his work which may be connected to the influence of Aaron Copland, with whom he studied in 1936–37. His classical works include two symphonies and a Rhapsody for Piano, Trumpet obbligato and Orchestra. His music for the 1976 television miniseries Rich Man, Poor Man was a Grammy Award nominee and an Emmy Award winner. He went on to score the sequel Rich Man, Poor Man Book II as well as the 1978 miniseries The Word. North is also known for his opening to the CBS television anthology series Playhouse 90 and the 1965 ABC television miniseries FDR.

== Legacy and recognition ==
North was the first American to become a member of the Union of Soviet Composers.

North was recognized for his lifetime achievement in 2004 from the Sammy Film Music Awards.

In 2016, the Library of Congress added North's 1951 recording of his score to A Streetcar Named Desire to its National Recording Registry.

== Personal and death ==
He had a professional and romantic relationship with Anna Sokolow. North was married twice and had three children. North died on September 8, 1991, in Los Angeles, California. He was cremated and his ashes were scattered at sea.

== Awards ==
The American Film Institute ranked North's score for A Streetcar Named Desire No. 19 on their list of the greatest film scores. His scores for the following films were also nominated for the list:

- Cleopatra (1963)
- The Misfits (1961)
- Spartacus (1960)
- Viva Zapata! (1952)
- Who's Afraid of Virginia Woolf? (1966)

North was nominated for fifteen Academy Awards throughout his career, one for Best Original Song, the rest in the Best Original Score category, making him the most-nominated composer to have never won. He was however awarded an Honorary Academy Award in 1986; he was the first composer to receive it.

- Nominated – A Streetcar Named Desire (1951)
- Nominated – Death of a Salesman (1951)
- Nominated – Viva Zapata! (1952)
- Nominated – The Rose Tattoo (1955)
- Nominated – Best Original Song (with Hy Zaret) "Unchained Melody" (1955)
- Nominated – The Rainmaker (1956)
- Nominated – Spartacus (1960)
- Nominated – Cleopatra (1963)
- Nominated – The Agony and the Ecstasy (1965)
- Nominated – Who's Afraid of Virginia Woolf? (1966)
- Nominated – The Shoes of the Fisherman (1968)
- Nominated – Shanks (1974)
- Nominated – Bite the Bullet (1975)
- Nominated – Dragonslayer (1981)
- Nominated – Under the Volcano (1984)
- Winner – Honorary Oscar "in recognition of his brilliant artistry in the creation of memorable music for a host of distinguished motion pictures." (1986)

Golden Globe Awards for Original Score:

- Nominated – Spartacus (1960)
- Winner – The Shoes of the Fisherman (1968)

ASCAP Award for Original Score:

- Winner – Lifetime Achievement (1986)
- Winner – Good Morning, Vietnam (1987)

Emmy Awards for Music Composition:

- Winner – Rich Man, Poor Man (1976)
- Nominated – The Word (1978)
- Nominated – Death of a Salesman (1985)

Grammy Awards for Original Score:

- Nominated – Cleopatra (1963)
- Nominated – Who's Afraid of Virginia Woolf? (1966)
- Nominated – Rich Man, Poor Man (1976)

== Selected filmography ==
- A Streetcar Named Desire (1951)
- Death of a Salesman (1951)
- Viva Zapata! (1952)
- Les Misérables (1952)
- Désirée (1954)
- Unchained (1955)
- The Rose Tattoo (1955)
- I'll Cry Tomorrow (1955)
- The Bad Seed (1956)
- The Rainmaker (1956)
- The King and Four Queens (1956)
- The Long, Hot Summer (1958)
- Stage Struck (1958)
- Hot Spell (1958)
- The Sound and the Fury (1959)
- The Wonderful Country (1959)
- Spartacus (1960)
- The Misfits (1961)
- Sanctuary (1961)
- The Children's Hour (1961)
- All Fall Down (1962)
- Cleopatra (1963)
- Cheyenne Autumn (1964)
- The Outrage (1964)
- The Agony and the Ecstasy (1965)
- Who's Afraid of Virginia Woolf? (1966)
- The Devil's Brigade (1968)
- The Shoes of the Fisherman (1968)
- Hard Contract (1969)
- A Dream of Kings (1969)
- Willard (1971)
- Pocket Money (1972)
- Shanks (1974)
- Bite the Bullet (1975)
- Journey into Fear (1975)
- Somebody Killed Her Husband (1978)
- Wise Blood (1979)
- Carny (1980)
- Dragonslayer (1981)
- Under the Volcano (1984)
- Prizzi's Honor (1985)
- The Dead (1987)
- Good Morning, Vietnam (1987)
- The Penitent (1988)
