= Juliette Benzoni =

French writer

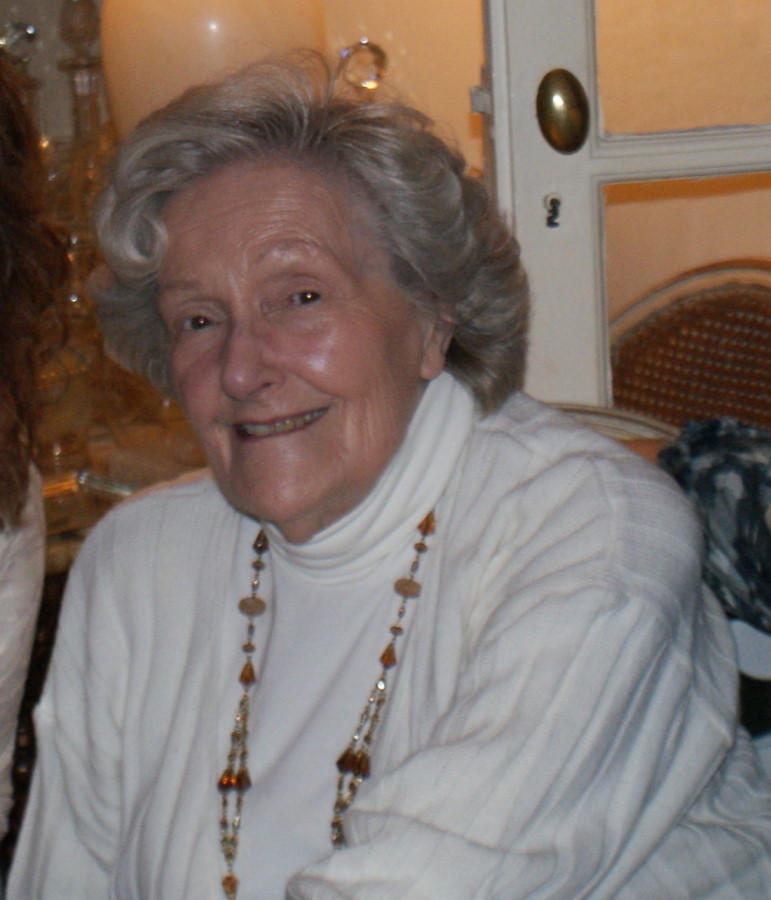
- Juliette Benzoni in 2009
- Born: Andrée-Marguerite-Juliette Mangin; 30 October 1920; Paris, France
- Died: 7 February 2016 (aged 95); Saint-Mandé, Saint-Mandé France
- Resting place: Cimetière Saint-Mandé Sud, Saint-Mandé, Val-de-Marne, France
- Occupations: Journalist author scriptwriter
- Writing career
- Years active: 1962–2016
- Genres: Historical romance, historical fiction
- Notable awards: Alexandre Dumas Prix (1973 for Literature); Prix Louis Barthou Académie française (1988); Knight of National Order of Merit France (1998)
- Website: juliette-benzoni-officiel.com

Juliette Benzoni (born Andrée-Marguerite-Juliette Mangin; 30 October 1920 – 7 February 2016) was a French author and international bestseller in several genres, including historical romance, historical fiction, mystery and screenwriting. In 1998, at the age of 78, she received the Chevalier de l'Ordre National (National Order of Merit) from President Jacques Chirac.

Known as the "Queen of History Novels" and "Daughter of Alexander Dumas", she wrote 86 books, which were translated into at least 22 languages.

== Personal life ==
She was born Andrée-Marguerite-Juliette Mangin, the daughter of Marie-Susanne Arnold (of Alsace and Swiss origin) and Charles-Hubert Mangin. She grew up in an upper-middle-class family in Paris. At the age of nine she discovered her passion for history through reading a book about Joan of Arc, and her father encouraged her to read the books of Alexander Dumas by giving her a copy of The Three Musketeers.

Benzoni was educated at the Lycée Fénelon, College d'Hulst and the Institut Catholique de Paris, where she studied philosophy, law and literature.

She married a doctor, Maurice Gallois in 1941, and they moved to Dijon where she became the mother of two children. While studying the history of Burgundy she discovered the Order of the Golden Fleece, which was later to inspire the seven Catherine novels. In 1950 her husband died of a heart attack, leaving her a widow at the age of 30 with two young children. She went to Morocco to visit her late husband's parents and found work at a radio station writing advertisements.

In Morocco she met a young French officer, Count André Benzoni di Conza from Corsica, and they married a few weeks before he was assigned to leave for Indochina to rejoin his regiment. Because of the unstable situation in Morocco, her husband wanted her to return to France, so in 1953 she went to live in the Parisian suburb of Saint-Mandé, where later her husband would become deputy mayor. Times were hard and she had to look for work, so she began employment as a journalist and author.

In 1982 her husband André Benzoni died, making her a widow for the second time. In January 1985 her son Jean-François Gallois died of a heart-attack, just like his father Maurice. It was the only time the author suffered from writer's block, while working on the first adventures of Le boiteux de Varsovie.

She lived in a Second Empire mansion with her daughter Anne Gallois, and went for long walks with her dog in the Bois de Vincennes, visiting her favourite library "Monaco" in Saint-Mandé. Her house was full of books from the cellar up to the first floor – not only literary encyclopaedias, history books, and travel guides but also collections of works by Agatha Christie, Anne Perry and Ken Follett. She travelled widely, and enjoyed gardening and cooking for her family and guests.

== Career ==
Returning to Paris from Morocco in 1953, Benzoni started to work as a journalist, writing historical articles at the Journal du Dimanche and Histoire pour tous. Under the pseudonym "Juliette Jansen" she interviewed celebrities such as Erich von Stroheim, Jean Cocteau, Jean Marais, Charles Trenet and Maurice Chevalier. She also began writing narrative adaptations and scenarios for comic strips that ran in some of the daily newspapers in Paris under the aegis of Opera Mundi. Collaborating with artists Robert Bressy she wrote dialogue for the serial soap Dr. Claudette and Dr. Fu Manchu.

In 1959 she participated in the popular television quiz show Le Gros Lot. The topic was the Italian Renaissance, and the subject was Catherina Sforza. In spite of floundering on the second-to-last question, the next day she was summoned by Gérald Gauthier, director of the Press Agency at Opéra Mundi. Impressed by her historical knowledge, he asked her if she could write a historical novel in the same style as the Angélique series, (by Anne Golon), which Opéra Mundi had published with great success in 1956. Benzoni agreed, already having an idea inspired by the legend of the Golden Fleece, and began to write the adventures of a golden-haired beauty during the Hundred Years' War.

Catherine was released in 1962 as a cliffhanger in the daily newspaper France-Soir as Il suffit d'un amour (One Love is Enough). In 1963 newspaper Le Figaro wrote: “before the book was even published it beats all records: it is already sold to ten different countries”. France-Soir confirmed: "it has an unprecedented destiny in the history of publishing..." On 10 June 1964 Le Provençal wrote: "A heroine – who takes place – alongside Scarlett O'Hara and The Marquise of the Angels" (Angélique).

Editions Trévise had in 1962, already published two collections of her short stories- La Reines tragiques and Aventuries du passé, but it was the Catherine novels that launched her career as a bestselling author.

In August 1964 Benzoni was invited to a cocktail party in London by Heinemann Ltd to introduce Catherine, One Love is Enough. There followed an interview with BBC radio reporter Leigh Crutchley introducing "Countess Juliette Benzoni di Conza" to the English press.

Inspired by the success, Benzoni continued to write. Seventeen historical series (sixty-five books), a collection of eighteen short story novels, three stand alone novels, all in all eighty-six books, followed. For her researches Benzoni was often seen at the local library "Monaco" in Saint-Mandé. She travelled all over the world to visit castles, museums, monasteries, libraries and villages for her work. Sometimes a museum painting would inspire a new story. She never kept a computer; each morning at six-thirty she got up and started writing on her old electric typewriter and wrote three pages – never missing a day, even on Sundays.

From time to time she appeared on television to introduce one of her new books or to give an interview at a radio station.

In 1965 a song was composed by Paul Amar, text by J. Benzoni, called Catherine, il suffit d'un amour, sung first by Michèle Arnaud and later Bernard Stéphane.

She met many members of the nobility, historians, authors, professors, directors and entertainers. Benzoni and historian Alain Decaux were mutual admirers. He wrote the preface for her book Par le Fer ou le Poison, where he mentioned her love of Alexander Dumas, and said "vous aidez à faire aimer l’histoire aux Français" (you help the French love history).

American President Ronald Reagan and his wife Nancy sent her a letter from the White House, after reading her first novel of the Le Gerfaut series (The Lure of the Falcon).

One of the factors in Benzoni's success as a Romancière was based on her thorough historical research. She wrote a series of books based on the histories of the castles in France, Le Roman des Châteaux de France, with a foreword by Stéphane Bern, journalist and moderator.

Although her later works were not widely translated, in 1984, she was one of the top ten female French writers whose works were translated into English.

=== Catherine novels ===
After the successful start of Catherine in Great Britain the American market also began to publish Benzoni's series 1967 with different book covers and titles. As Catherine and a Time for love had ended in 1968 with an epiloque, and the last two books were written years later in 1973 and 1979 due to the demand from her French readers for new Catherine adventures, the final sixth and seventh books were not commonly translated for overseas markets.

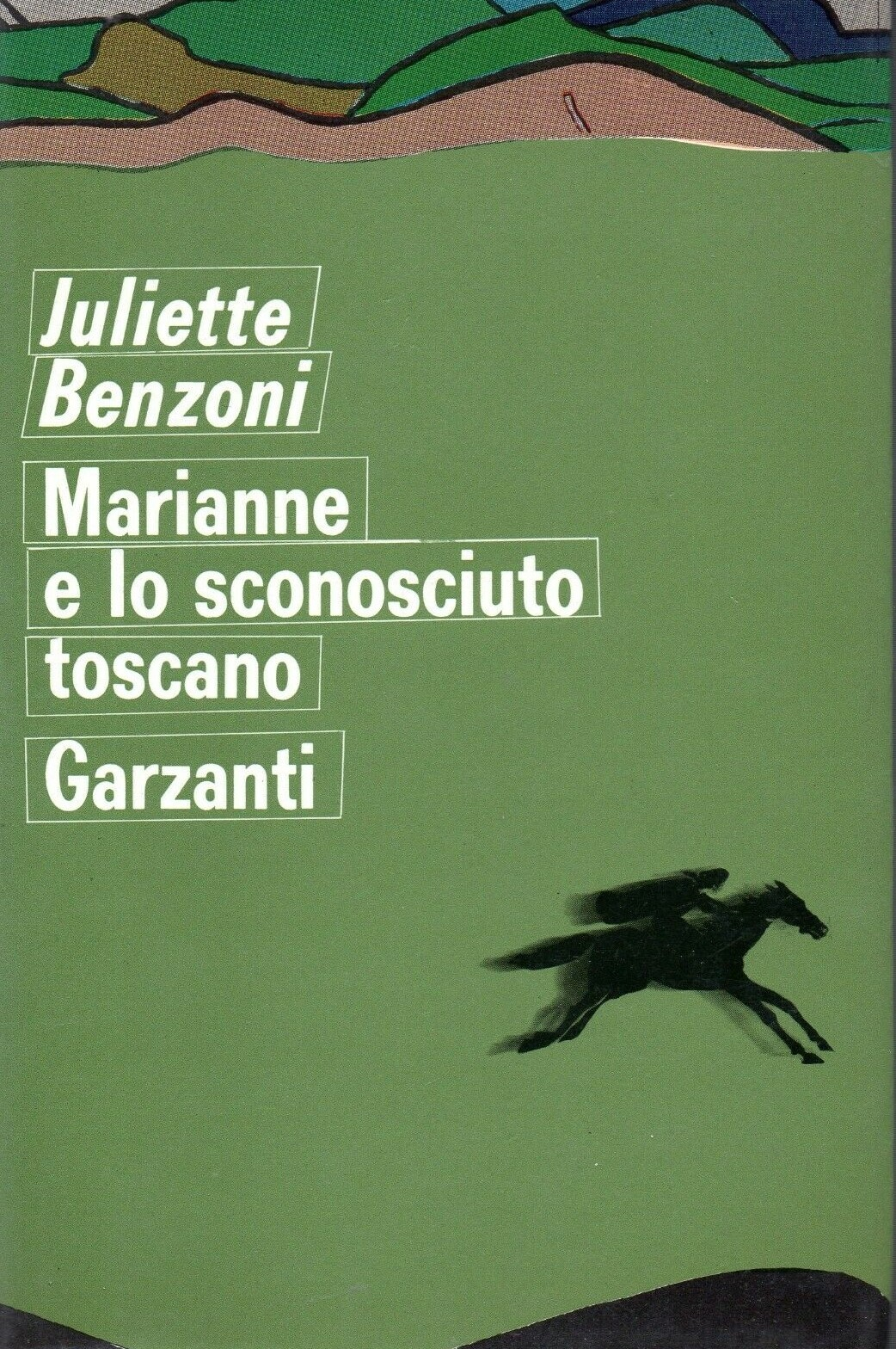
Italian Book cover of Marianne e lo sconosciuto toscano (1972) corresponds to the second book "Marianne and the masked Prince" Artwork Fulvio Bianconi

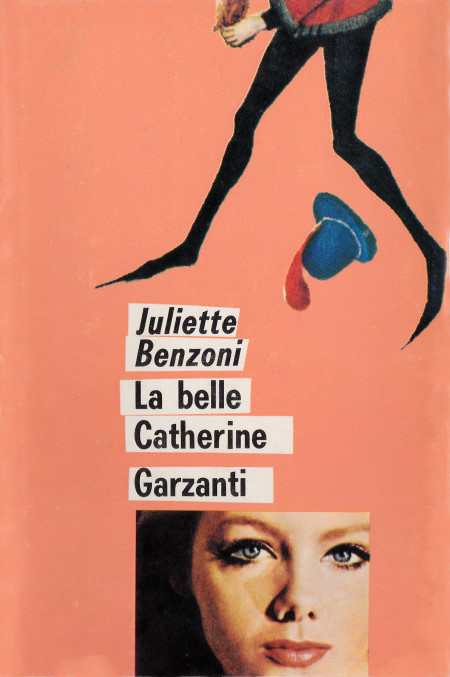
La belle Catherine 1967 - Italian Book cover by Artist Fulvio Bianconi

Later in 1985, Benzoni confessed to having " a weakness for Catherine, because she was the first of my heroines", whereas the series Marianne, a star for Napoleon was an order by my publisher for the occasion of the bicentenary of the Emperor" Henri de Monfort wrote in his new books review "qui est la meilleure garantie du plaisir et de l’émotion qu’y prendra le lecteur. Ajoutez qu’il est de bonne langue et de bon style." (which is the best guarantee to keep a reader spellbound with pleasure and emotion during reading. Worth mentioning are the excellent treasury of words and of style)

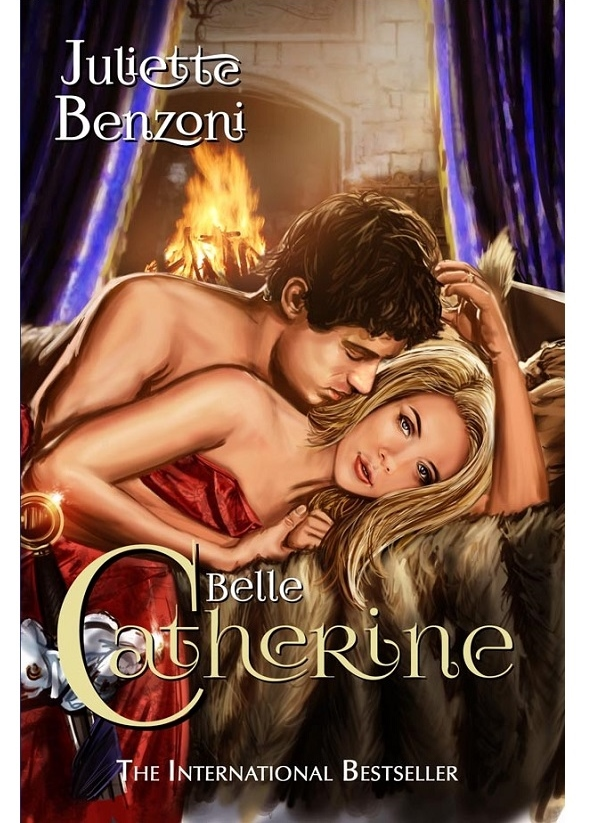
English Book cover of Belle Catherine 2017 Artwork Martin Baines

In 2014 the English publisher Telos Publishing bought the rights from Benzoni to re-issue the Catherine series which included the never before translated seventh book Catherine: La Dame de Montsalvy, titled Catherine: The Lady of Montsalvy. Telos Publishing announced on their website that this time the Catherine novels would be full and unabridged translations.

=== The Aldo Morosini Adventures ===
In the Nineties, Benzoni created a new hero, a Venetian prince, "His Highness Aldo Morosini” an expert on historic and precious stones. As Benzoni explained at the end of a later edition of the first novel in the series, the Aldo Morosini Adventures originated in the request of a famous French actor for her to write a television series script for an adventure story set in Venice, with him in the leading role.

What started as a set of four novels, each titled after a famous precious stone, became a series of 15 books, enjoyed by both male and female readers. The adventures of the dashing Aldo Morosini were translated in Hungary, Portugal, Spain, Russia, Slovakia, the Czech Republic, Greece and Poland. Because of its success, the author started writing new Aldo adventures in between other novels. Although popular in Europe, as of 2022, no publishers have translated the books into English.

The last adventure of Aldo Morosini, Le Vol du Sancy: Des Carats pour Ava? was published by Plon two weeks before Benzoni's death in 2016. French historian, author and specialist in jewellery, Vincent Meylan wrote in his obituary for Benzoni "Aldo Morosini, the Venetian prince is in mourning..."

== Filmography ==
In 1968 the producer of the Angélique films was given rights to turn Catherine, One love is Enough into a film. Benzoni stated that when she saw the film, she "cried like a waterfall" (original French text: je pleurais comme une fontaine) because the producer Bernard Broderie had completely changed the story. This cinema adventure became a topic never to be mentioned again, although when French television approached her to adapt another novel Marianne, a star for Napoleon with director Marion Sarraut to be in charge, she agreed.

In a 1983 press release for Marianne, une étoile pour Napoléon Benzoni writes "Thanks to Marion Sarraut, director after my heart... provided with a heart, sensibility and talent, a great artistic sense and an astonishingly sure flair to choose interpreters”. Quoting from an article in Tele star, dating from 15 March 1986 she said: “I do not want a director other than Marion”. Benzoni wrote the screenplay with Jean Chatenet and the television series became a huge success. Confidently she agreed in 1985 to the filming of Catherine, il suffit d'un amour. It was to be the longest series so far on French television. In 1987 followed Le Gerfaut (The Lure of the Falcon), then La Florentine.

Catherine was first adapted in 1969 for cinema, as a French, German, and Italian Production by Bernard Broderie. Four years later Antenne 2 – SFP Production bought the filming rights for four of Benzoni's other books; Marianne, a star for Napoleon, Catherine, One Love is Enough, Le Gerfaut and La Florentine.

- Catherine was adapted for cinema in 1969 under the title of Catherine, il suffit d'un amour by Bernard Broderie, with Olga Georges-Picot and Horst Frank
- Marianne was adapted in 1983 for television, a series of 30 episodes by Marion Sarraut with Corinne Touzet and Jean-François Poron.
- Catherine was adapted for television, a series of 60 episodes by Marion Sarraut with Claudine Ancelot and Pierre-Marie Escourrou.
- Le Gerfaut (Lure of the Falcon) was adapted in 1987 for television, a series of 30 episodes by Marion Sarraut with Laurent Le Doyen and Marianne Anska.
- La Florentine was adapted in 1991 for television, a series of 10 episodes by Marion Sarraut with Anne Jacquemin and Alain Payan.
- Twenty years after the Marie series (Marie des intrigues 2004, Marie des passions 2005) was published, it has 2024, been adapted for television as a mini-series (four episodes) with the title: Une amitié dangereuse (A dangerous friendship) by Alain Tasma. It is the story of the friendship between Marie de Rohan, also known as the Duchess of Chevreuse, and Anne of Austria, Queen of France. Starring Kelly Depeault as the Duchess of Chevreuse, Stephanie Gil as the Queen of France. Amongst others Stanley Weber, Jack Laskey.

== Awards and honours ==
In 1973, Benzoni received the Alexandre Dumas Prix for her work to date, the Catherine and the Marianne series. As a fervent admirer of Alexander Dumas since childhood, she always kept the medal on her working table. In 1988 the Académie française awarded her with the Literature Prix Louis Barthou, for Félicia au Soliel Couchant. In 1998, at the age of 78, she received the Chevalier de l'Ordre National, awarded by the President of the French Republic.

- 1973 Alexandre Dumas Prix
- 1988 Louis Barthou prix – Literature
- 1998 Knight of National Order of Merit

== Death ==
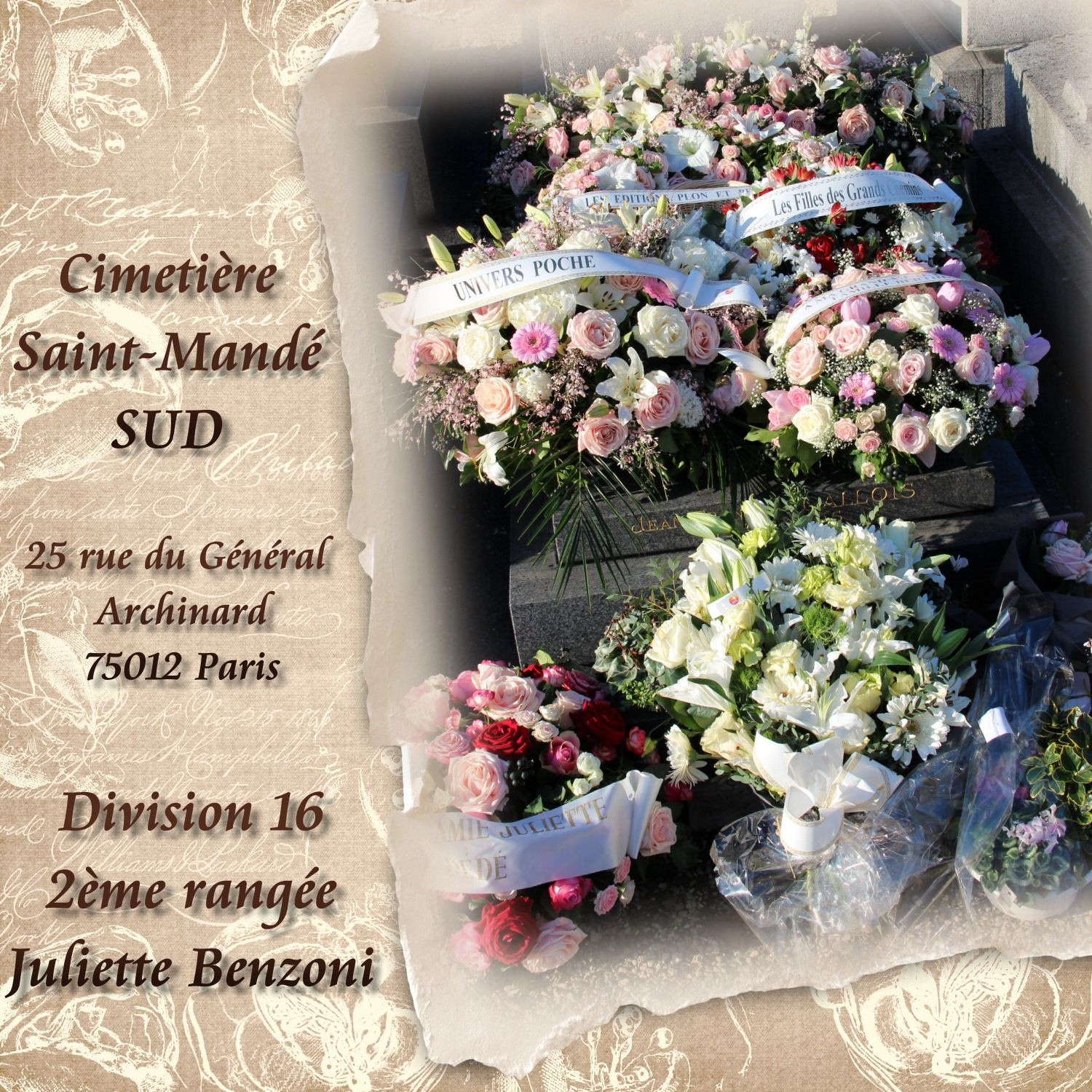
Resting place of Juliette Benzoni

Juliette Benzoni died peacefully in her sleep on 7 February, 2016 in Saint-Mandé, with, her daughter Anne at her side. In the book of condolence which was provided online, readers all over the world expressed their sadness She is buried at the Cemetery in Saint-Mandè Sud, with her mother, husband and son.

== Publications ==
=== The series ===
Series translated into English:

- Catherine series (7 novels)
  - One Love is Enough Catherine (1964) Original title: Il suffit d'un amour I 1963 / Editions Trévise
  - Catherine (1965) Original title: Il suffit d'un amour II 1964
  - Belle Catherine (1966) Original title: Belle Catherine 1966
  - Catherine and Arnaud (1967) Original French title: Catherine des Grands Chemins 1967
  - Catherine and a Time for Love (1968) Original French title: Catherine et le temps d'aimer 1968
  - A Snare for Catherine (1974) Original French title: Piège pour Catherine 1974
  - Catherine: The Lady of Montsalvy (2021) Original French title: Catherine: La Dame de Montsalvy 1979
- Marianne series (6 novels)
  - Marianne, the bride of Selton Hall (1969) Original French title: Marianne, une étoile pour Napoléon 1969
  - Marianne and the masked Prince (1971) Original French title: Marianne et l'inconnu de Toscane 1971
  - Marianne and the Privateer (1972) Original French title: Marianne - Jason des quatre mers 1972
  - Marianne and the Rebels (1973) Original French title: Marianne - toi Marianne 1972
  - Marianne and the Lords of the East (1975) Original French title: Marianne les lauriers de flammes I 1974
  - Marianne and the Crown of Fire (1975) Original French title: Marianne les lauriers de flammes II 1974
- The Lure of the Falcon series (4 novels)
  - The Lure of the Falcon (1978) Original French title: Le Gerfaut des brumes 1976
  - The Devil's Diamonds (1980) Original French title: Un collier pour le diable 1978
  - Le Trésor (1980) not translated into English
  - Haute-Savanne (1981) not translated into English.

Not available in English (as of 2017)

- Les Loups de Lauzargues series (3 novels)
  - Jean de la Nuit (1985)
  - Hortense au Point du Jour (1985)
  - Félicia au Soleil couchant (1987)
- La Florentine series
  - Fiora et le Magnifique (1988)
  - Fiora et le Téméraire (1988)
  - Fiora et le Pape (1989)
  - Fiora et le Roi de France (1990)
- Les Dames du Méditerranée-Express series (3 novels)
  - La jeune mariée (1990)
  - La fière Americaine (1991)
  - La princesse Manchou (1991)
- Les Treize vents series (4 novels)
  - Le Voyageur (1992)
  - Le Réfugié (1993)
  - L'Intrus (1993)
  - L'Exilé (1994)
- Les aventures d'Aldo Morosini (15 novels) 1994 – 2016
  - Le Boiteux de Varsovie series (4 novels)
    - L'étoile bleue (1994)
    - La rose d'York (1995)
    - L'Opale de Sissi ( 1996)
    - Le Rubis de Jeanne la Folle (1996)
- La suite des aventures d'Aldo Morosini (11 novels)
  - Les émeraudes du Prophète (1999)
  - La perle de l'Empereur (2001)
  - Les joyaux de la sorcière (2004)
  - Les "larmes" de Marie-Antoinette (2006)
  - Le collier sacré de Montezuma (2007)
  - L'Anneau d'Atlantide (2009)
  - La Chimère d'Or des Borgia part 1 of 2 (2011)
  - La Collection Kledermann part 2 of 2 (2012)
  - Le Talisman du Téméraire
    - Les trois frères part 1 of 2 (2013)
    - Le diamant de Bourgogne part 2 of 2 (2014)
  - Le vol du Sancy – Des carats pour Ava? (2016)
- Secret d'État series (3 novels)
  - La chambre de la reine (1997)
  - Le roi des halles (1998)
  - Le prisonnier masqué (1998)
- Le Jeu de l'amour et de la mort series (3 novels)
  - Un homme pour le Roi (1999)
  - La messe rouge (2000)
  - La comtesse des ténébres (2000)
- Les Chevaliers series (3 novels)
  - Thibaut ou la croix perdue (2002)
  - Renaud ou la malédiction (2003)
  - Olivier ou les trésors templiers (2003)
- Marie series (2 novels)
  - Marie des intrigues (2004)
  - Marie des passions (2005)
- Le Sang des Koenigsmarck (2 novels)
  - Aurore (2006)
  - Fils de l'Aurore (2007)
- Le Temps des Poisons (2 novels)
  - On a tué la reine ! (2008)
  - La chambre du roi (2009)
- Le Bal des poignards ( 2 novels)
  - La dague au lys rouge (2010)
  - Le couteau de Ravaillac (2010)
- La Guerre des duchesses (2 novels)
  - La fille du condamné (2012)
  - Princesse des Vandales (2013)

=== Short Stories ===
- Les Reines tragiques (1962)
- Aventuries du Passé (Les chemins de l'Aventure) (1963)
- Par le fer ou le poison (1973)
- Le sang, la gloire et l'amour (1974)
- Trois Seigneurs de la nuit (1978)
- Grandes Dames petites vertus (Elles ont aimé) (1978)
- De sac et de corde (Crimes et Criminels) (1979)
- Tragédies Impériales (1980)
- Dames, Drames et Demons (Suite Italienne) (1980)
- Dans le lit des Rois: Nuit de noces (1983)
- Dans le lit des Reines: les amants (1984)
- Le Roman des châteaux de France (3 volumes: historical essays) (1985)
- Cent ans de vie de château (la vie de Châteaux) (1992)
- Les reines du Faubourg (2006)
- Ces belles inconnues de la Révolution (2014)
- Ces Femmes du Grand Siècle (historical essay) (2015)

=== Single novels ===
- Un aussi long chemin (1983)
- De deux Roses l'une... (1997)
- La petite peste et le chat botté (2015)
