= Shanks (film) =

- Theatrical release poster
- Directed by: William Castle
- Written by: Ranald Graham
- Produced by: William Castle; Steven North; Sheldon Schrager
- Starring: Marcel Marceau; Tsilla Chelton; Philippe Clay
- Cinematography: Joseph Biroc
- Edited by: David Berlatsky
- Music by: Alex North
- Distributed by: Paramount Pictures
- Release date: October 9, 1974
- Running time: 93 minutes
- Country: United States
- Language: English

Shanks is a 1974 American surrealist horror film about a puppeteer able to manipulate dead bodies like puppets. Mime Marcel Marceau, in his first major film role, plays the titular Malcolm Shanks. It was the last film directed by producer-director William Castle.

== Plot ==
In a film that explicitly describes itself as "a grim fairy tale" (in intertitles), Malcolm Shanks (Marceau) is a deaf (but expert lip reader), mute puppeteer who lives with his cruel sister (Tsilla Chelton) and her alcoholic husband, Mr. Barton (Philippe Clay). His skill with puppets is noticed by Mr. Walker (also Marceau) who takes him on as a lab assistant at his gothic mansion. His sister and brother-in-law make him be the breadwinner, and are outraged when he keeps $50 of his own pay. The doctor's experiments involve reanimating the dead and controlling them like puppets. He begins with a frog and a chicken. When Mr. Walker dies unexpectedly, Malcolm comes home and cradles his puppet of Mr. Walker in his arms (Shanks's puppet shows are personal projects based on his family and people in the town, and he is making one of his teenage assistant and friend, Celia, for her birthday). His family is outraged that he is not at work, and Barton smashes in the head of the puppet of Mr. Walker and insists Malcolm return to work, which he does by using the experimental procedure on Mr. Walker.

When Mr. Walker doesn't answer the phone, Barton arrives in person. Malcolm attacks Barton with the reanimated chicken, and Barton falls down the stairs to his death. Malcolm then buries Mr. Walker "out of mercy" (according to an intertitle), and animates Barton instead, walking him through the streets all the way home. Barton's marionette-like movements can pass for drunkenness, and his wife runs out into the street where she is struck and killed by a car. He evades a police officer (Morgan) responding to a neighbors call about the accident by setting his family up as though he is sitting between them watching TV as the officer shines the flashlight through the window. He then animates her through the same procedure.

The next day, he takes them to the grocery store (outside of which he performs) to see if they can pass for living, which they do. He pays off the Barton grocery tab over and above what is owed, and the grocer (Castle), allows them to take whatever they like, Malcolm having Barton fill a wicker basket with his characteristic gin. He again encounters Celia, whose mother gives her permission to go with Malcolm on a picnic where he demonstrates all he can do with the Bartons, although she becomes very disturbed when she learns they are dead, which he gestures was the result of a car accident, implicitly for both. Malcolm takes Celia to see Walker's mansion for her birthday. Celia is enchanted by pictures of Mr. Walker's beautiful wife (unseen by the audience), who predeceased him, finds one of her dresses, and reverently puts it on. Malcolm, who also puts on 19th century attire (but keeping on his bell bottoms) then has dinner with Celia with the Bartons as servants. Mrs. Barton cuts off her finger while cutting the cake, which Malcolm hides from Celia by putting in his lapel pocket.

Outside, a motorcycle gang is near the mansion when their leader, Beethoven (Phil Adams), runs off the road and is killed. The gang carries him into the perpetually unlocked mansion and lays him on the table, sending the cake and other objects to the floor. Other gang members attack Malcolm and Celia. One of them, Goliath (Manard) sexually assaults Celia, and his girlfriend, Mata Hari (Kallianiotes) tries to stop him, but is unable. Goliath hits Mata Hari, and she proceeds to get drunk on Barton's gin. Another gang member, Einstein (Calfa), becomes interested in Walker's experiments and makes the Bartons do tricks more humiliating than Malcolm would have considered. Malcolm finds Celia lying dead in the yard, and animates Walker out of the grave to fight the gang after they throw the Barton controls into the well. The gang is horrified by Walker and flees. In a sepia tone sequence, Malcolm reanimates Celia for a brief dance, at which point the film returns to the opening scene, revealing that the entire revenge scenario is simply what is going on in Malcolm's mind as he performs his puppet show, the imaginary sequence bookended with extreme close ups of Malcolm's eye. Each puppet gets his curtain call, and the film ends with a quote from William Makepeace Thackeray: "Come... let us shut up the box and the puppets—for our play is played out."

== Cast ==
- Marcel Marceau as Malcolm Shanks / Old Walker
- Tsilla Chelton as Mrs. Barton
- Philippe Clay as Mr. Barton
- Cindy Eilbacher as Celia
- Helena Kallianiotes as Mata Hari
- Don Calfa as Albert Einstein
- Larry Bishop as Napoleon
- Biff Manard as Goliath

== Production ==
Marceau, who had for decades before performed in his signature white face makeup and without speaking, both spoke and appeared without makeup for this film. He played two roles: Malcolm Shanks, who could not speak, and Old Walker, who could. He had appeared in 20 shorts and films in small and cameo roles, often as his mime character Bip. Director William Castle took an interest in him after watching him perform the pantomime "Youth, Maturity, Old Age and Death" and approached him with the script for Shanks, saying it dealt with similar themes. Said Marceau of the script, "it was exactly what I had been looking for." The film was shot in Vancouver.

== Release ==
=== Home media ===
Shanks was released for the first time on DVD and Blu-ray by Olive Films on May 28, 2013.

== Reception ==
=== Critical response ===
A. H. Weiler of The New York Times called the film "an extraordinary but only intermittently edifying fable", commending the film's performances, while criticizing the "far out" nature of its premise. Time Out London gave the film a mostly positive review, praising Clay, Chelton, Marceau's performances, while criticizing the film's third act as being routine. Concluding their review, Time Out stated that the film "nevertheless remains a strikingly effective experiment". Dennis Schwartz from Ozus’ World Movie Reviews rated the film a grade B, writing, "Though the reanimation concept was inventive, it soon became tiresome and the awkward acting became a chore to watch as the film veered between comedy, sentimentality and unease. Shanks just had too slight of a story and it was too poorly paced to be much more than a freaky chiller that held my attention because it was so genuinely goofy." Roger Ebert awarded the film two out of four stars, calling the film "a disappointment", feeling that the film's intriguing concept, though well-handled, was never fully engaging. Ebert also criticized the film's slow pacing, and its character's lack of depth.

=== Awards and nominations ===
Composer-Conductor Alex North was nominated for Best Music, Original Dramatic Score for the 47th Academy Awards in 1975. The score includes both horrific and often atonal music and clarinet-centered popular jazz reflecting a bygone era.

== See also ==
- List of American films of 1974
