= Henri Chaix =

French jazz pianist and bandleader

Henri François Chaix (February 21, 1925, Geneva – June 11, 1999, Geneva) was a French jazz pianist and bandleader.

== Early life and career ==
Chaix was born in Geneva, but both of his parents were French citizens; he studied at the Conservatoire de Musique de Genève but never became a Swiss national. In 1943 he joined Loys Choquart's Dixie Dandies ensemble, and in 1951 was a sideman for Claude Aubert's band, a group he would eventually become the leader of. He also began recording under his own name in the 1950s, both on solo piano and with ensembles, and worked as a sideman for American expatriates such as Sidney Bechet, Bill Coleman, and Albert Nicholas. He worked frequently as a leader in the 1960s and did many of his own arrangements; Roger Zufferey and Michel Pilet were some of his sideman. He also worked in the 1960s with Milt Buckner, Benny Carter, Buck Clayton, Guy Lafitte, Ray Nance, Rex Stewart, and Ben Webster.

In the 1970s Chaix worked extensively in a trio format, with bassist Alain Du Bois and drummer Romano Cavicchiolo. He was a regular on radio and at European jazz festivals in that decade, and also played with Swiss ensembles such as The Tremble Kids and The Hot Mallets, and as a sideman with Oscar Klein, Buddy Tate, and Clark Terry. In the 1980s and 1990s he worked with Lafitte, Terry, European Jazz Giants, Bob Barnard, Doc Cheatham, Jesper Thilo, Earle Warren, and Roy Williams.
