= Dark Ages (historiography) =

Term for the Early Middle Ages

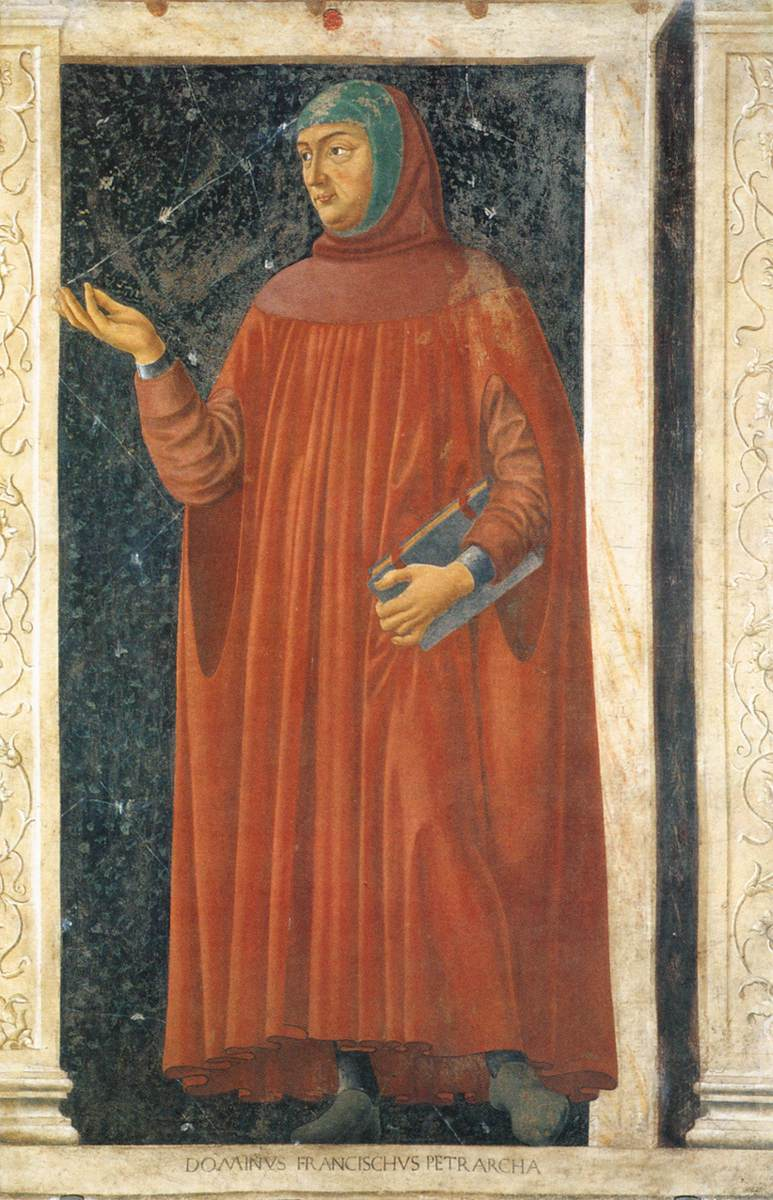
Petrarch (1304–1374), who conceived the idea of a European "Dark Age". From Cycle of Famous Men and Women, Andrea di Bartolo di Bargilla, c. 1450

"Dark Ages" is a term, now deprecated by most historians, for the Early Middle Ages (c. 5th–10th centuries), or occasionally the entire Middle Ages (c. 5th–15th centuries), in Western Europe after the fall of the Western Roman Empire, which characterises it as marked by economic, intellectual, and cultural decline.

The concept of a "Dark Age" as a historiographical periodization originated in the 1330s with the Italian scholar Petrarch, who regarded the post-Roman centuries as "dark" compared with the "light" of classical antiquity. The term employs traditional light-versus-darkness imagery to contrast the era's supposed darkness (ignorance and error) with earlier and later periods of light (knowledge and understanding). The phrase 'Dark Age(s)' itself derives from the Latin saeculum obscurum, originally applied by Caesar Baronius in 1602 when he referred to a tumultuous period in the 10th and 11th centuries. The concept thus came to characterize the entire Middle Ages as a time of intellectual darkness in Europe between the fall of Rome and the Renaissance, and became especially popular during the 18th-century Age of Enlightenment. Others, however, have used the term to denote the relative scarcity of written records regarding at least the early part of the Middle Ages.

As the accomplishments of the era came to be better understood in the 19th and the 20th centuries, scholars began restricting the 'Dark Ages' appellation to the Early Middle Ages; today's scholars maintain this posture. The majority of modern scholars avoid the term altogether because of its negative connotations, finding it misleading and inaccurate. Despite this, Petrarch's pejorative meaning remains in use, particularly in popular culture, which often oversimplifies the Middle Ages as a time of violence, backwardness, and intellectual restriction.

== History ==
=== Petrarch ===
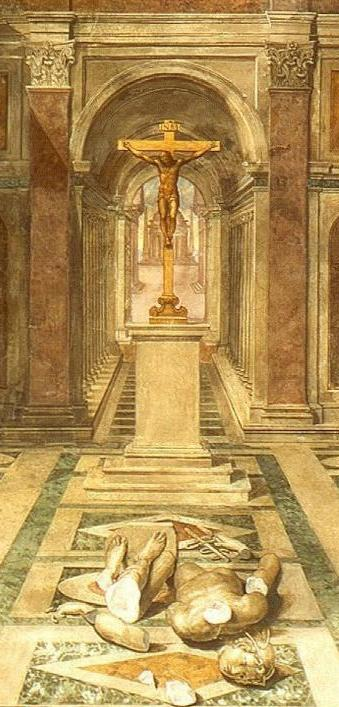
Triumph of Christianity by Tommaso Laureti (1530–1602), ceiling painting in the Sala di Constantino, Vatican Palace. Images like this one celebrate the triumph of Christianity over the paganism of Antiquity.

The idea of a Dark Age originated with the Tuscan scholar Petrarch in the 1330s. Writing of the past, he said: "Amidst the errors there shone forth men of genius; no less keen were their eyes, although they were surrounded by darkness and dense gloom". Christian writers, including Petrarch himself, had long used traditional metaphors of 'light versus darkness' to describe 'good versus evil'. Petrarch was the first to give the metaphor secular meaning by reversing its application. He now saw classical antiquity, so long considered a 'dark' age for its lack of Christianity, in the 'light' of its cultural achievements, while Petrarch's own time, allegedly lacking such cultural achievements, was seen as the age of darkness.

From his perspective on the Italian peninsula, Petrarch saw the Roman period and classical antiquity as an expression of greatness. He spent much of his time traveling through Europe, rediscovering and republishing classic Latin and Greek texts. He wanted to restore the Latin language to its former purity. Renaissance humanists saw the preceding 900 years as a time of stagnation, with history unfolding not along the religious outline of Saint Augustine's Six Ages of the World, but in cultural (or secular) terms through progressive development of classical ideals, literature, and art.

Petrarch wrote that history had two periods: the classic period of Greeks and Romans, followed by a time of darkness in which he saw himself living. In around 1343, in the conclusion of his epic Africa, he wrote: "My fate is to live among varied and confusing storms. But for you perhaps, if as I hope and wish you will live long after me, there will follow a better age. This sleep of forgetfulness will not last forever. When the darkness has been dispersed, our descendants can come again in the former pure radiance." In the 15th century, historians Leonardo Bruni and Flavio Biondo developed a three-tier outline of history. They used Petrarch's two ages, plus a modern, 'better age', which they believed the world had entered. Later, the term 'Middle Ages' – Latin media tempestas (1469) or medium aevum (1604), was used to describe the period of supposed decline.

=== Reformation ===
During the Reformations of the 16th and 17th centuries, Protestants generally had a similar view of history as Renaissance humanists such as Petrarch, but they added an anti-Catholic perspective. The Lutheran Magdeburg Centuries are a notable example of such a view. Protestants saw classical antiquity as a golden time, not only because of its Latin literature, but because it witnessed the beginnings of Christianity. They promoted the idea that the 'Middle Age' was a time of darkness because of corruption within the Catholic Church, such as popes ruling as kings, veneration of saints' relics, a licentious priesthood, and institutionalized moral hypocrisy.

=== Baronius ===
In response to the Protestants, Catholics developed a counter-image to depict the High Middle Ages in particular as a period of social and religious harmony and not 'dark' at all. The most important Catholic reply to the Magdeburg Centuries was the Annales Ecclesiastici by Cardinal Caesar Baronius. Baronius was a trained historian who produced a work that the Encyclopædia Britannica in 1911 described as "far surpassing anything before" and that Acton regarded as "the greatest history of the Church ever written". The Annales covered the first twelve centuries of Christianity to 1198 and was published in twelve volumes between 1588 and 1607. It was in Volume X that Baronius coined the term "dark age" for the period between the end of the Carolingian Empire in 888 and the first stirrings of Gregorian Reform under Pope Clement II in 1046:

Volumes of Patrologia Latina per century
| Century | Volumes | # of volumes |
|---|---|---|
| 7th | 80–88 | 8 |
| 8th | 89–96 | 7 |
| 9th | 97–130 | 33 |
| 10th | 131–138 | 7 |
| 11th | 139–151 | 12 |
| 12th | 152–191 | 39 |
| 13th | 192–217 | 25 |

The new age (saeculum) that was beginning, for its harshness and barrenness of good could well be called iron, for its baseness and abounding evil leaden, and moreover for its lack of writers (inopia scriptorum) dark (obscurum).

Significantly, Baronius termed the age 'dark' because of the paucity of written records. The "lack of writers" he referred to may be illustrated by comparing the number of volumes in Migne's Patrologia Latina containing the work of Latin writers from the 10th century (the heart of the age he called 'dark') with the number containing the work of writers from the preceding and succeeding centuries. A minority of these writers were historians.

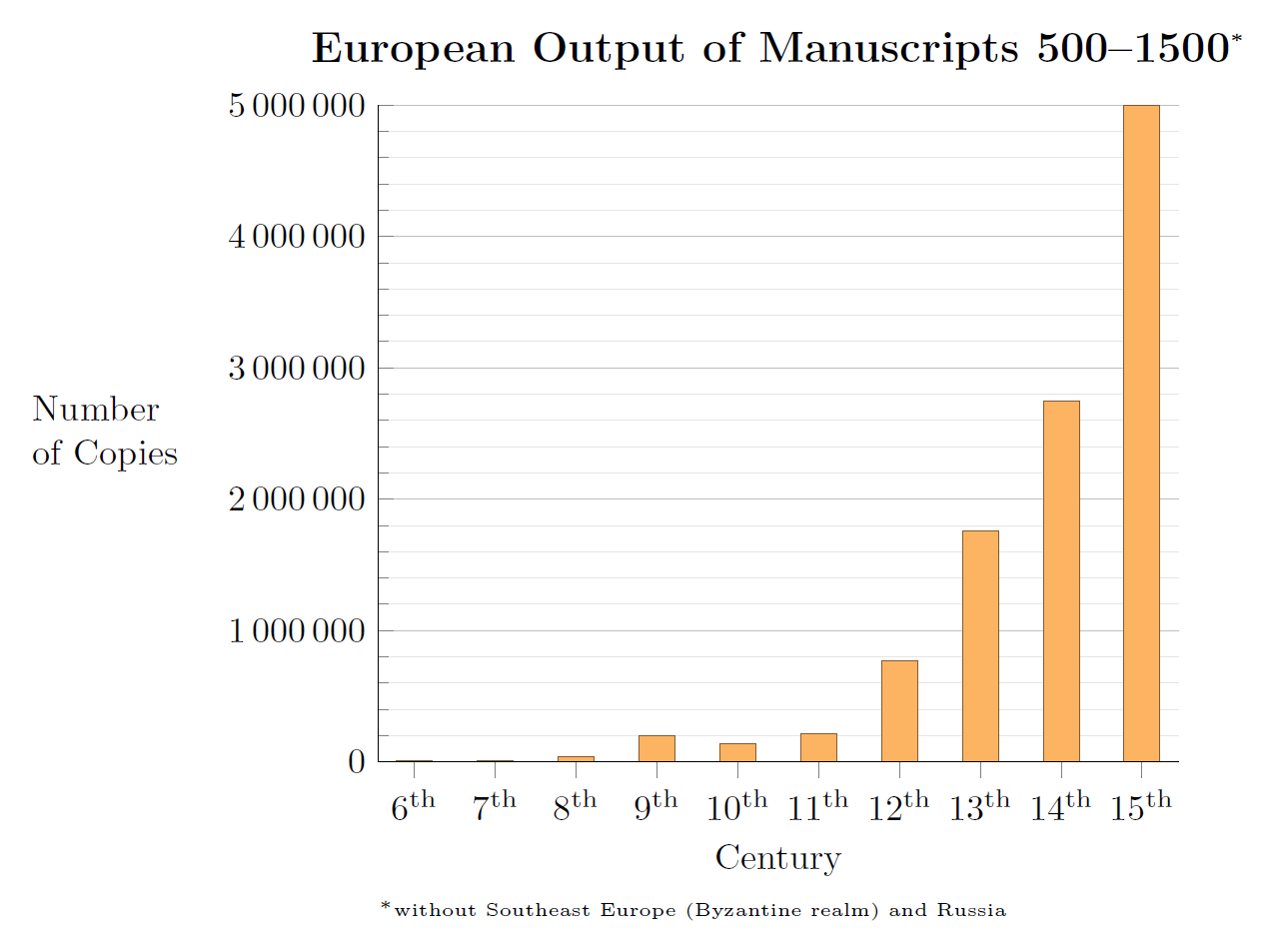
Medieval production of manuscripts. The beginning of the Middle Ages was also a period of low activity in copying. This graph does not include the Byzantine Empire.

There is a sharp drop from 34 volumes in the 9th century to just 8 in the 10th. The 11th century, with 13, evidences a certain recovery, and the 12th century, with 40, surpasses the 9th, something that the 13th, with just 26, fails to do. There was indeed a 'dark age', in Baronius's sense of a "lack of writers", between the Carolingian Renaissance in the 9th century and the beginnings, sometime in the 11th, of what has been called the Renaissance of the 12th century. Furthermore, there was an earlier period of "lack of writers" during the 7th and 8th centuries. Therefore, in Western Europe, two 'dark ages' can be identified, separated by the brilliant but brief Carolingian Renaissance.

Baronius' 'dark age' seems to have struck historians, for it was in the 17th century that the term started to spread to various European languages, with his original Latin term saeculum obscurum being reserved for the period to which he had applied it. Some, following Baronius, used 'dark age' neutrally to refer to a dearth of written records, but others used it pejoratively and lapsed into that lack of objectivity that has discredited the term for many modern historians.

The first British historian to use the term was most likely Gilbert Burnet, in the form 'darker ages' which appears several times in his work during the later 17th century. The earliest reference seems to be in the "Epistle Dedicatory" to Volume I of The History of the Reformation of the Church of England of 1679, where he writes: "The design of the reformation was to restore Christianity to what it was at first, and to purge it of those corruptions, with which it was overrun in the later and darker ages." He uses it again in the 1682 Volume II, where he dismisses the story of "St George's fighting with the dragon" as "a legend formed in the darker ages to support the humour of chivalry". Burnet was a bishop chronicling how England became Protestant, and his use of the term is invariably pejorative.

=== Enlightenment ===
During the Age of Enlightenment of the 17th and 18th centuries, many critical thinkers saw religion as antithetical to reason. For them the Middle Ages, or "Age of Faith", was therefore the opposite of the Age of Reason. Baruch Spinoza, Bernard Fontenelle, Immanuel Kant, David Hume, Thomas Jefferson, Thomas Paine, Denis Diderot, Voltaire, Marquis De Sade and Jean-Jacques Rousseau were vocal in attacking the Middle Ages as a period of social regress dominated by religion, while Gibbon in The History of the Decline and Fall of the Roman Empire expressed contempt for the "rubbish of the Dark Ages". Yet just as Petrarch, seeing himself at the cusp of a "new age", was criticising the centuries before his own time, so too were Enlightenment writers.

Consequently, an evolution had occurred in at least three ways. Petrarch's original metaphor of light versus dark has expanded over time, implicitly at least. Even if later humanists no longer saw themselves living in a dark age, their times were still not light enough for 18th-century writers who saw themselves as living in the real Age of Enlightenment, while the period to be condemned stretched to include what we now call Early Modern times. Additionally, Petrarch's metaphor of darkness, which he used mainly to deplore what he saw as a lack of secular achievement, was sharpened to take on a more explicitly anti-religious and anti-clerical meaning.

=== Romanticism ===
In the late 18th and the early 19th centuries, the Romantics reversed the negative assessment of Enlightenment critics with a vogue for medievalism. The word "Gothic" had been a term of opprobrium akin to "vandal" until a few self-confident mid-18th-century English "Goths", such as Horace Walpole, initiated the Gothic Revival in the arts. This stimulated interest in the Middle Ages, which for the following generation began to take on the idyllic image of an "Age of Faith". This, reacting to a world dominated by Enlightenment rationalism, expressed a romantic view of a Golden Age of chivalry. The Middle Ages were seen with nostalgia as a period of social and environmental harmony and spiritual inspiration, in contrast to the excesses of the French Revolution and, most of all, to the environmental and social upheavals and utilitarianism of the developing Industrial Revolution. The Romantics' view is still represented in modern-day fairs and festivals celebrating the period with 'merrie' costumes and events.

== Modern scholarly use ==
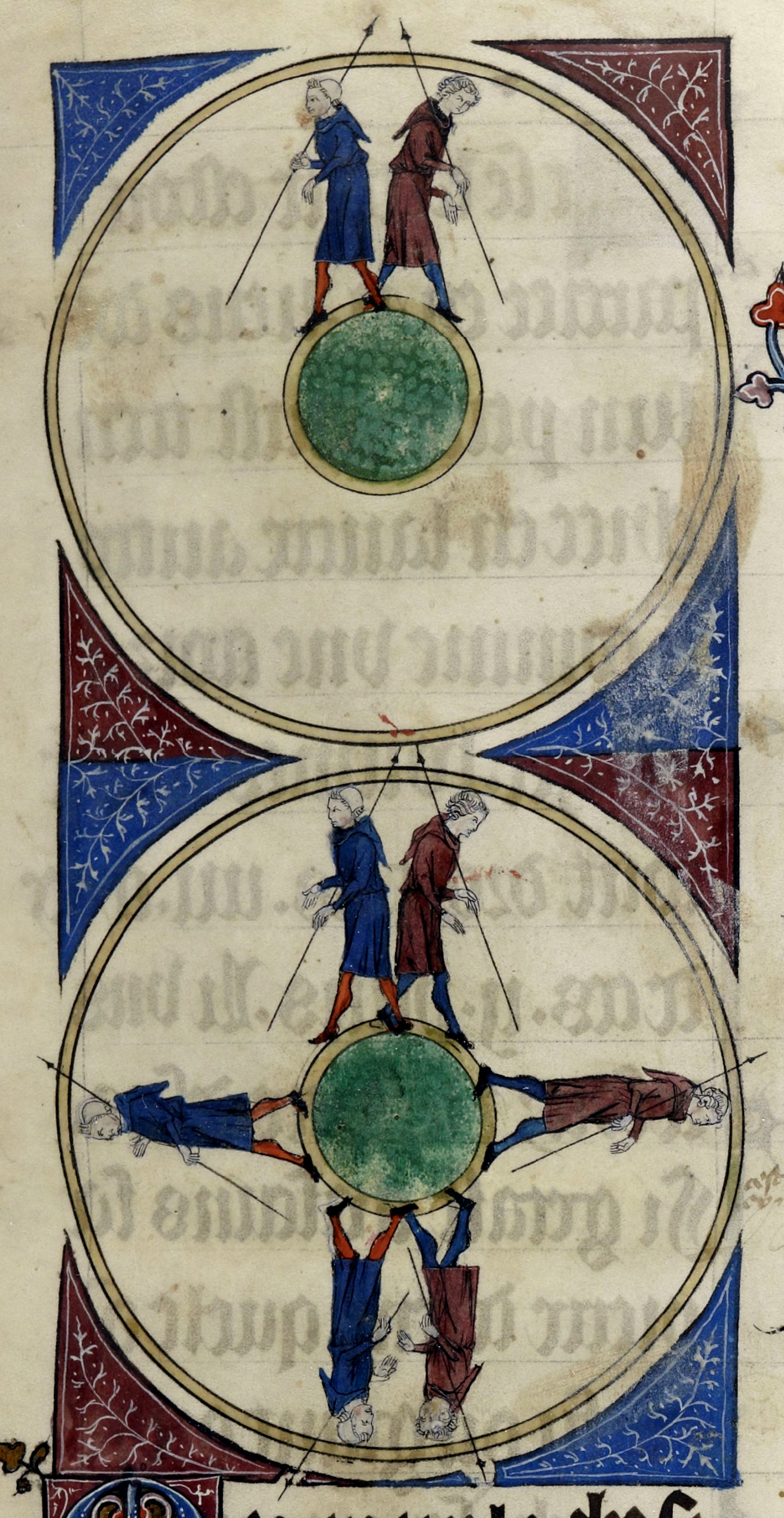
Medieval artistic illustration of the spherical Earth in a 14th-century copy of L'Image du monde (c. 1246)

The term was widely used by 19th-century historians. In 1860, in The Civilization of the Renaissance in Italy, Jacob Burckhardt delineated the contrast between the medieval 'dark ages' and the more enlightened Renaissance, which had revived the cultural and intellectual achievements of antiquity. The earliest entry for a capitalized "Dark Ages" in the Oxford English Dictionary (OED) is a reference in Henry Thomas Buckle's History of Civilization in England in 1857, who wrote: "During these, which are rightly called the Dark Ages, the clergy were supreme." The OED in 1894 defined an uncapitalised "dark ages" as "a term sometimes applied to the period of the Middle Ages to mark the intellectual darkness characteristic of the time". Since the Late Middle Ages significantly overlap with the Renaissance, the term 'Dark Ages' became restricted to distinct times and places in medieval Europe. Thus the 5th and 6th centuries in Britain, at the height of the Saxon invasions, have been called "the darkest of the Dark Ages".

The term "Dark Ages" was increasingly questioned from the mid-twentieth century as archaeological, historical and literary studies led to greater understanding of the period, In 1977, the historian Denys Hay wrote ironically of "the lively centuries which we call dark". More forcefully, a book about the history of German literature published in 2007 describes "the dark ages" as "a popular if uninformed manner of speaking".

Most modern historians do not use the term "dark ages" and prefer terms such as Early Middle Ages. However, when used by some historians today, the term "Dark Ages" is meant to describe the economic, political and cultural problems of the era. For others, the term "Dark Ages" is intended to be neutral, expressing the idea that the events of the period seem 'dark' to us because of the paucity of the historical record. For example, Robert Sallares, commenting on the lack of sources to establish whether the plague pandemic of 541 to 750 reached Northern Europe, opines that "the epithet Dark Ages is surely still an appropriate description of this period".

However, from the later 20th century onward, other historians became critical even of this nonjudgmental use of the term for two main reasons. Firstly, it is questionable whether it is ever possible to use the term in a neutral way: scholars may intend it, but ordinary readers may not understand it so. Secondly, 20th-century scholarship had increased understanding of the history and culture of the period, to such an extent that it is no longer really 'dark' to modern viewers. To avoid the value judgment implied by the expression, many historians now avoid it altogether. It was occasionally used up to the 1990s by historians of early medieval Britain, for example in the title of the 1991 book by Ann Williams, Alfred Smyth and D. P. Kirby, A Biographical Dictionary of Dark Age Britain, England, Scotland and Wales, c.500 – c.1050, and in the comment by Richard Abels in 1998 that the greatness of Alfred the Great "was the greatness of a Dark Age king". In 2020, John Blair, Stephen Rippon and Christopher Smart observed that: "The days when archaeologists and historians referred to the fifth to the tenth centuries as the 'Dark Ages' are long gone, and the material culture produced during that period demonstrates a high degree of sophistication."

== Modern non-scholarly use ==
A 2021 lecture by Howard Williams of Chester University explored how "stereotypes and popular perceptions of the Early Middle Ages – popularly still considered the European 'Dark Ages' – plague popular culture"; and finding 'Dark Ages' is "rife outside of academic literature, including in newspaper articles and media debates". As to why it is used, according to Williams, legends and racial misunderstandings have been revitalized by modern nationalists, colonialists and imperialists around present-day concepts of identity, faith and origin myths i.e. appropriating historical myths for modern political ends.

In a book about medievalisms in popular culture by Andrew B. R. Elliott (2017), he found "by far" the most common use of 'Dark Ages' is to "signify a general sense of backwardness or lack of technological sophistication", in particular noting how it has become entrenched in daily and political discourse. Reasons for use, according to Elliott, are often "banal medievalisms", which are "characterized mainly by being unconscious, unwitting and by having little or no intention to refer to the Middle Ages"; for example, referring to an insurance industry still reliant on paper instead of computers as being in the 'Dark Ages'. These banal uses are little more than tropes that inherently contain a criticism about lack of progress. Elliott connects 'Dark Ages' to the "Myth of Progress", also observed by Joseph Tainter, who says, "There is genuine bias against so-called 'Dark Ages'" because of a modern belief that society normally traverses from lesser to greater complexity, and when complexity is reduced during a collapse, this is perceived as out of the ordinary and thus undesirable; he counters that complexity is rare in human history, a costly mode of organization that must be constantly maintained, and periods of less complexity are common and to be expected as part of the overall progression towards greater complexity.

In Peter S. Wells's 2008 book, Barbarians to Angels: The Dark Ages Reconsidered, he writes, "I have tried to show that far from being a period of cultural bleakness and unmitigated violence, the centuries (5th–9th) known popularly as the Dark Ages were a time of dynamic development, cultural creativity, and long-distance networking". He writes that our "popular understanding" of these centuries "depends largely on the picture of barbarian invaders that Edward Gibbon presented more than two hundred years ago", and that this view has been accepted "by many who have read and admire Gibbon's work".

David C. Lindberg, a science and religion historian, says the 'Dark Ages' are "according to wide-spread popular belief" portrayed as "a time of ignorance, barbarism and superstition", for which he asserts "blame is most often laid at the feet of the Christian church". Medieval historian Matthew Gabriele echoes this view as a myth of popular culture. Andrew B. R. Elliott notes the extent to which "Middle Ages/Dark Ages have come to be synonymous with religious persecution, witch hunts and scientific ignorance".
