= Henri Spade =

French journalist, television producer and novelist

- Born: 16 July 1921; Paris, France
- Died: 12 November 2008 (aged 87); Paris, France
- Education: University of Paris; University of Strasbourg
- Occupations: Journalist, television producer, novelist
- Spouse: Michèle Stouvenot

Henri Spade (16 July 1921 - 12 November 2008) was a French journalist, television producer and novelist. He co-produced La joie de vivre, the first entertainment program on French television, in the 1950s. He directed and produced television films. He was "a pioneer of French television".

== Early life ==
Henri Spade was born on July 16, 1921, in Paris, France. He graduated from the University of Paris and the University of Strasbourg, where he studied the Humanities and the Law. During World War II, he joined the Free French Forces in Spain.

== Career ==
Spade began his career as a journalist in Paris from 1945 to 1949. He became a television producer for Radiodiffusion-Télévision Française in 1949. He first co-produced Le Magazine du cinéma, a television program about cinema, with Robert Chazal, in 1949. With Jean Nohain, he co-produced over 200 episodes La joie de vivre from 1952 to 1959. Hosted by Jacqueline Joubert at the Alhambra theatre, it was the first entertainment program on French television and included performances by Edith Piaf, Maurice Chevalier, Mistinguett, Yves Montand, Jeanne Moreau, Elvire Popesco, Serge Reggiani, Jean Yanne and Danielle Darrieux, among others. It also included sketches by comedians like Roger Pierre and Bourvil. Moreover, it played an important role in the audiovisual democratisation of operettas.

Spade began teaching at his alma mater, the University of Paris, in 1971. A year later, in 1972, he became the deputy director of the Office de Radiodiffusion Télévision Française and, until 1988, director-producer of the Société française de production, where he produced and directed television films.

Spade was the author of fourteen novels and two non-fiction books. He was also a songwriter.

== Death ==
Spade was married to Michèle Stouvenot, a journalist. He died on 12 November 2008 in Paris.

== Works ==
=== Novels ===
- Spade, Henri (1958). Le premier matin. Paris: Éditions du Seuil. OCLC 30643576.
- Spade, Henri (1968). Les enfants de la guerre 1 : Le temps des cerises. Paris: Éditions France-Empire. OCLC 460417393.
- Spade, Henri (1969). Les enfants de la guerre 2 : La renaissance. Paris: Éditions France-Empire. OCLC 463078554.
- Spade, Henri (1969). La Polonaise. Paris: Éditions France-Empire. OCLC 20201667.
- Spade, Henri (1972). La Berthe. Paris: Éditions France-Empire. OCLC 35682627.
- Spade, Henri (1973). Le chant de Maïoré. Paris: Éditions France-Empire. OCLC 2317308.
- Spade, Henri (1974). La Grimpe. Paris: Éditions France-Empire. OCLC 1288874.
- Spade, Henri (1975). Une heure pour chanter. Paris: Éditions France-Empire. OCLC 3035903.
- Spade, Henri (1976). Mathieu, Gaston, Peluche. Paris: Éditions France-Empire. OCLC 2701324.
- Spade, Henri (1979). Le passé antérieur. Paris: Éditions France-Empire. OCLC 11727605.
- Spade, Henri; Tournier, Élisabeth (1984). La Crevasse des maquisards. Paris: Librairie générale française. ISBN 9782253035336. OCLC 461707286.
- Spade, Henri (1986). La Céline. Paris: Plon. ISBN 9782259015301. OCLC 17106002.
- Spade, Henri (1989). Enquête sur un amour perdu. Paris: Robert Laffont. ISBN 9782221052112. OCLC 23410057.
- Spade, Henri (1991). Florence Aral. Paris: Grasset. ISBN 9782246410911. OCLC 23647972.

=== Non-fiction ===
- Spade, Henri (1968). Histoire d'amour de la télévision française. Paris: Éditions France-Empire. OCLC 14104596.
- Spade, Henri (1974). Et pourquoi pas la patrie?. Paris: Julliard. OCLC 1342102.
