= Marion Sarraut =

French film director (1938–2021)

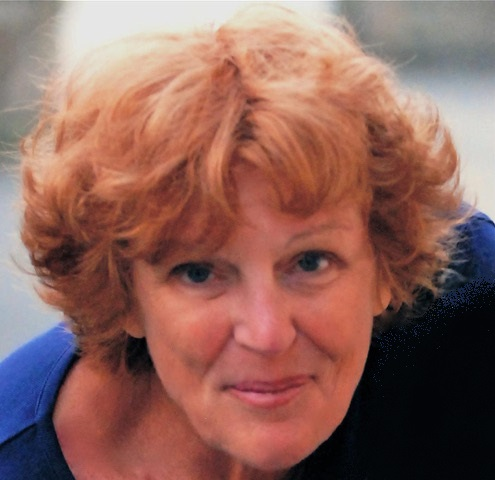
- Born: 13 August 1938; Saigon, French Indochina
- Died: 12 July 2021 (aged 82)
- Occupation: Film director

Marion Sarraut (French: [maʁjɔ̃ saʁo]; 13 August 1938 – 12 July 2021) was a French film and theatre director.

== Biography ==
Born in Saigon in French Indochina, Marion was the granddaughter of former Prime Minister Albert Sarraut. She studied at the École nationale supérieure des arts et techniques du théâtre for three years, and subsequently participated in the creation of the magazine Cahiers du Cinéma. She spent a significant amount of time alongside the directors of the French New Wave, becoming a screenwriter and assistant director for the Société française de production and Maritie and Gilbert Carpentier. For more than ten years, she directed the series Numéro un, as well as children's shows such as L'Île aux enfants and Les Visiteurs du mercredi. In the 1980s, she directed numerous telefilms.

Sarraut was a member of Collectif 50/50, which aims to promote gender equality and diversity in cinema and audiovisual. She was a member of the Société des auteurs, compositeurs et éditeurs de musique, as well as the Société pour l'administration du droit de reproduction mécanique. She was administrator of the Fondation Ostad Elahi, directing a film on the life and works of Nur Ali Elahi.

Marion Sarraut died on 12 July 2021 at the age of 82.

== Distinctions ==
- Knight of the Ordre des Arts et des Lettres (1987)
- Knight of the Legion of Honour (2002)

== Filmography ==
=== Actress ===
- Shoot the Piano Player (1960)
- A Woman Is a Woman (1961)
- Le Signe du Lion (1962)

=== Director ===
- Le Bel Indifférent (1978)
- Les Amours des années folles (1980)
- Les Amours des années grises (1981)
- Areu=MC2 (1982)
- Marianne (1983)
- Hôtel de police (1985)
- Catherine (1986)
- Le Gerfaut (1987)
- La Comtesse de Charny (1989)
- La Florentine (1991)
- Riviera (1991)
- Tout feu tout flamme (1994)
- Placé en garde à vue (1994)
- Julie Lescaut (1995)
- Mourir d'amour (1995)
- Les Cordier, juge et flic (1995, 1997)
- Petite Sœur (1996)
- Une femme d'honneur (1996–2003)
- L'Ami de mon fils (1997)
- Belle Grand-mère (1998)
- Jacotte (1999)
- Toutes les femmes sont des déesses (2000)
- Fugues (2000)
- Roule routiers (2000)
- Docteur Sylvestre (2001)
- Louis la Brocante (2001)
- Belle Grand-mère 2 (2001)
- Père et Maire (2002–2004)
- Fabien Cosma (2004–2005)
- Mis en bouteille au château (2005)
- Famille d'accueil (2006–2007)
- Un viol (2009)
- Le Premier été (2014)
- Pacte sacré (2015)
- La Sainte famille (2017)
