= Montsalvy =

Commune in Auvergne-Rhône-Alpes, France

- Commune
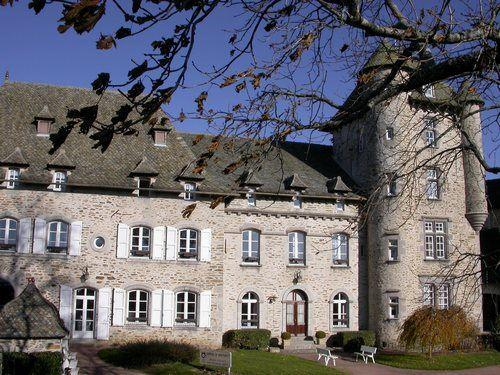
- Château of Montsalvy

- Coat of arms
- Location of Montsalvy
- Location within France Location within Auvergne-Rhône-Alpes
- Coordinates: 44°42′29″N 2°30′03″E
- Country: France
- Region: Auvergne-Rhône-Alpes
- Department: Cantal
- Arrondissement: Aurillac
- Canton: Arpajon-sur-Cère
- Intercommunality: Châtaigneraie Cantalienne

Government
  - Mayor (2020–2026): Isabelle Lemaire
- Area^{1}: 20.29 km^{2} (7.83 sq mi)
- Elevation: 780 m (2,560 ft)
- Highest elevation: 822 m (2,697 ft)
- Lowest elevation: 269 m (883 ft)
- Population (2023): 842
  - Density: 41.5/km^{2} (107/sq mi)
- Time zone: UTC+01:00 (CET)
  - Summer (DST): UTC+02:00 (CEST)
- INSEE/Postal code: 15134 /15120
- ^{1} French Land Register data, which excludes lakes, ponds, glaciers > 1 km^{2} (0.386 sq mi or 247 acres) and river estuaries.

Montsalvy (French pronunciation: [mɔ̃salvi]; Occitan: Montsauvi) is a commune in the Cantal department in south-central France.

== History ==
Montsalvy was founded around 1070 as a monastery with a Sauveté, (a refuge zone around a church or a chapel by several boundary markers) by Bérenger de Millau, husband of Adèle de Carlat.

Formerly the "capital" of the Veinazès region, it was for a long time the chief town of the Canton de Montsalvy. Today it is part of the canton of Arpajon-sur-Cère and is the second largest commune in terms of population.

== Population ==
Historical population
Year	Pop.	±% p.a.
1968	947	—
1975	1,100	+2.16%
1982	927	−2.41%
1990	970	+0.57%
1999	896	−0.88%
2007	890	−0.08%
2012	877	−0.29%
2017	817	−1.41%
2023	842	+0.50%
Source: INSEE

== See also ==
- Communes of the Cantal department

== Culture ==
=== Literature ===
Montsalvy appears in the following works:

- Juliette Benzoni, French author (Alexandre Dumas Prix 1973) who wrote and set her Catherine (Benzoni novel) series historical romance in Montsalvy.

=== Notable person ===
- Marcellin Boule (1861–1942), palaeontologist, geologist, and anthropologist, was born and died in Montsalvy.
