= Loys Choquart =

Swiss radio musician and jazzman (1920-1989)

Loys Choquart (October 11, 1920 in Geneva – December 10, 1989 in Puplinge) was a Swiss jazz reedist, bandleader, and broadcaster.

Choquart was leading his own ensemble by age 17, and at 19 had a position at Radio Geneva, remaining a broadcaster with the station for decades. He first recorded with his ensemble the New Rhythm Kings in 1942, and with a new ensemble, the Dixie Dandies, in 1943 (which included Henri Chaix and Wallace Bishop as sidemen). According to jazz historian Rainer E. Lotz, by the end of World War II "he was considered the best Swiss saxophone and clarinet soloist", playing in both Dixieland and swing idioms. His Creole Jazz ensemble won the Prix Jazz Hot in 1955 on the basis of recordings made in 1952. He also led a larger ensemble with an orchestra, which included André Zumbach (fr). Later in his life he toured extensively throughout western Europe and owned a club in Geneva called La Tour.
