= Catherine (Benzoni novel) =

Series of French historical romance novels by the author Juliette Benzoni

Catherine: One Love is Enough
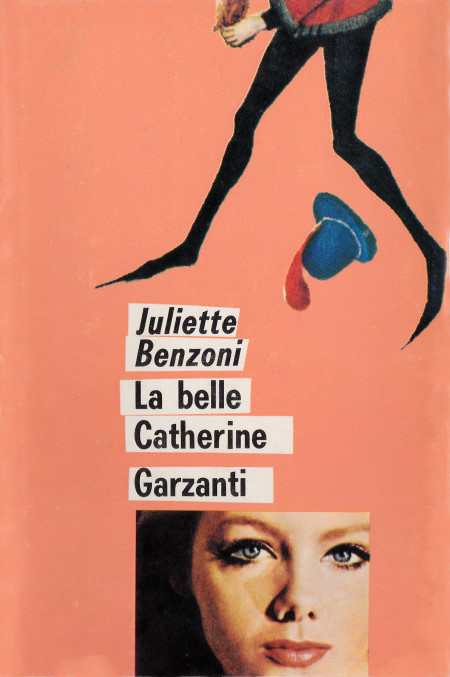
- Italian book cover by artist Fulvio Bianconi
- Author: Juliette Benzoni
- Original title: Il suffit d'un amour
- Translator: Jocasta Goodwin
- Language: French
- Series: Catherine saga
- Genre: Historical romance Historical fiction
- Set in: France in the Middle Ages during the 15th century between 1413 and 1437
- Publisher: Éditions de Trévise; Heinemann Ltd; Telos Publishing
- Publication date: 1963
- Publication place: France
- English publication date: 1964
- Media type: Print (both hardback and paperback); E-book (Amazon Kindle and other devices)
- Awards: Prix Alexandre-Dumas (1973 for "Literature")
- Followed by: Catherine; Belle Catherine; Her Great Journey; A Time for Love; A Trap for Catherine; The Lady of Montsalvy

Catherine: One Love is Enough, first published in France as Il suffit d'un amour is the first of a series of seven historical romance novels written by the best-selling author Juliette Benzoni between 1963 and 1978.

It focuses on the fictitious heroine Catherine Legoix, daughter of a goldsmith in Paris at the time of the Hundred Years' War and her seemingly hopeless love for the arrogant Arnaud de Montsalvy, Lord of the Châtaignerie in Auvergne and a captain in the service of King Charles VII. From there starts a love story that will span through the events of that time. Her adventures take place in the Kingdom of France, which is torn apart by a civil war and is still suffering English occupation. The adventures fascinated millions of readers all over the world during the 1960s and 1970s.

In 1965, a song was composed by Paul Amar with additional text by Benzoni, called Song for Catherine, which was introduced in the television show Ni figue, ni raisin.

== Plot summary ==
The novel is set in the Kingdom of France at the time of the Hundred Years' War, during the war between the Armagnacs and the Burgundians. It begins in 1413 in Paris and continues in Dijon at the court of Philip the Good, Duke of Burgundy, Bruges, Montsalvy, Auvergne, Orléans, Loire Valley, Burgos, Alhambra, and Luxembourg. The series finally ends in 1437 at the castle of Montsalvy. Catherine goes through many adventures; men fall desperately in love with her, her whole life is constantly in danger, and she is hunted down as a criminal and condemned to die more than once, until she finally becomes the beloved wife of Arnaud de Montsalvy, Lord of the Châtaignerie in Auvergne and a captain in the service of King Charles VII.

=== One Love is Enough ===
On 27 April 1413 during the Parisian riots, Catherine Legoix, 13-year-old daughter of a goldsmith living on the Pont-au-Change with her family, tries in vain to save a young knight, 16-year-old Armagnac Michel de Montsalvy, who has been condemned to be hanged for calling Duke John the Fearless, a traitor and spitting into his face. The attempt to saving Michel de Montsalvy that changes her life forever. Years later, she grows up at the age of 21 to be a rare beauty with long golden hair and huge violet eyes. Catherine meets a wounded knight, the noble and valiant Arnaud is Michel de Montsalvy's younger brother. They fall in love at first sight, but when the impulsive Arnaud learns that Catherine is related to the family who butchered his brother, he tells her that he only does not kill her because she is a woman. Her beauty attracts many men, including Duke Philip the Good, who desires the beautiful maiden, taking her prisoner during a procession. He orders his treasurer, Garin de Brazey to marry her, so the Duke can receive the low-born Catherine at his court.

=== Catherine ===
The series continues with Catherine returning home and being beaten by her husband after spending a night at the palace, having been forced to stay by command of Duke Philip. When Catherine is told that Arnaud de Montsalvy will marry damsel Isabelle de Sévérac, she becomes the mistress of the Duke. For reasons unknown to Catherine, her marriage is never consummated, but her husband is very jealous and abducts her and tries to get her killed. He is condemned to death and only then reveals his secret to her. After Garin's death, Catherine is the uncrowned Queen of Dijon, Philip bestowing upon her the title of Countess of Brazey with castles, jewellery, servants, and she bears him a son, Philippe de Brazey. After the child dies at the age of four, she discovers that Arnaud de Montsalvy is not in fact married, but at war defending the city of Orléans. She decides to leave her riches behind and join him, to die at his side.

=== Belle Catherine ===
Catherine and Arnaud are condemned to death at Rouen, for trying to free Joan of Arc. They are able to escape, but when Catherine awakes in the morning, Arnaud is kidnapped while looking for food. Her journey brings her to the castle of the infamous Gilles de Rais who betrays his brother-in-arms to his cousin Georges de la Trémoille. After many detours the couple is again united and they marry, but they pay bitterly for this moment of happiness. Her husband is hunted down by the King's men as a traitor for trying to save Joan of Arc. The ancestral family of the castle at Montsalvy in Auvergne, is razed to the ground and the family banished from the court of King Charles VII.

=== Her Great Journey ===
Catherine, her son and mother-in-law have found refuge at Carlat. Queen Yolande (mother-in-law of Charles VII) sends the trusted monk Étienne to Catherine with a letter. The Queen, who knows the truth about Arnaud de Montsalvy's cruel fate (had caught a disease which everyone assumes to be leprosy) wishes her to return into her service. Catherine answers the call of Queen Yolande of Aragon, and conspires for the downfall of her enemy La Trémoille.

=== A Time for Love ===
The journey begins with Catherine now a pilgrim on her way to Compostela. At the monastery of Roncesvaux, she meets the wounded squire Fortunat who had left with his Lord Arnaud de Montsalvy for Compostela. She learns from him that Arnaud never had leprosy, but is now the prisoner of a beautiful princess, the sister of the King of Granada. Catherine decides to travel with Josse to the Emirate of Granada to get her husband back. At Granada, Catherine goes to the house of her old friend Abou-al-Khayr, the Moorish doctor. With his help, Catherine enters the Alhambra and is chosen as the new favourite of the Caliph. One night, while walking in the garden, she meets her husband, who although overjoyed to see her, is now cured and in full possession of his strength, and proves a very jealous husband, believing she has been unfaithful. The princess, realising that her prisoner and the Caliphs' new favourite "Light of Dawn" (Catherine), must know each other, tries to kill Catherine. With the help of Abou-al-Khayr, they are able to escape and return to Montsalvy.

=== A Trap for Catherine ===
The penultimate book begins with the village in Montsalvy being under attack by the routier Berault d'Apchier and his band. They know that the Lord of Montsalvy has left for Paris to join the battle against the English. Catherine's loyal people are able to catch the traitor, she learns that Gonnet d'Apchier is on his way to Paris, to denounce Catherine as an adulteress and claim that she opened the gates for her so-called lover Jean d'Apchier. When they arrive in Paris, Arnaud de Montsalvy is in the Bastille, for killing the murderer of his brother Michel de Montsalvy. Catherine rides to Bourges to see the King and ask for a pardon for her husband, but Charles VII refuses. Queen Yolande receives her and writes a pardon for Arnaud, but asks that Catherine deliver a letter in secret to her son René d'Anjou who is a prisoner of Philip of Burgundy. Shortly before Catherine arrives at her destination she and her servants are kidnapped by a band of routiers. To Catherine's horror as the mercenaries are led by Arnaud de Montsalvy, her husband does not believe her and carrying with him the forged evidence of her supposed adultery, he tries to enter the castle and gets severely wounded by a crossbow. Believing that Arnaud is dying and to save her servants, they flee in the night with the help of Catherine's old childhood friend Landry.

=== The Lady of Montsalvy ===
The final book begins with Catherine, and her servants at the castle of Châteauvillain. Catherine rides to Dijon to see René d'Anjou and delivers the letter from his mother Queen Yolande of Aragon. Shortly afterwards Catherine falls into a trap and escapes more dead than alive from a perfidious attack on her life. Escorted by her page Béranger de Roquemaurel and squire Gauthier Chazay, she leaves Burgundy, never wishing to return. She travels to Luxembourg where she hopes to catch up with Arnaud, who follows a young woman posing as Joan of Arc. Her husband has already left when Catherine arrives, but she is able to unmask the woman who claims to be the late Joan of Arc. Unexpected circumstances bring her to Flanders, where she meets Philip of Burgundy again. The Duke still loves her passionately and believes she has returned to him. A day later, Catherine is taken hostage by the people of Bruges, who believe she is still the mistress of the Duke of Burgundy. With the help of Jean de Rémy, sent in disguise as a monk by Philip of Burgundy, Catherine, Béranger and Gauthier can finally take the road back to Montsalvy.

== Background and publication ==
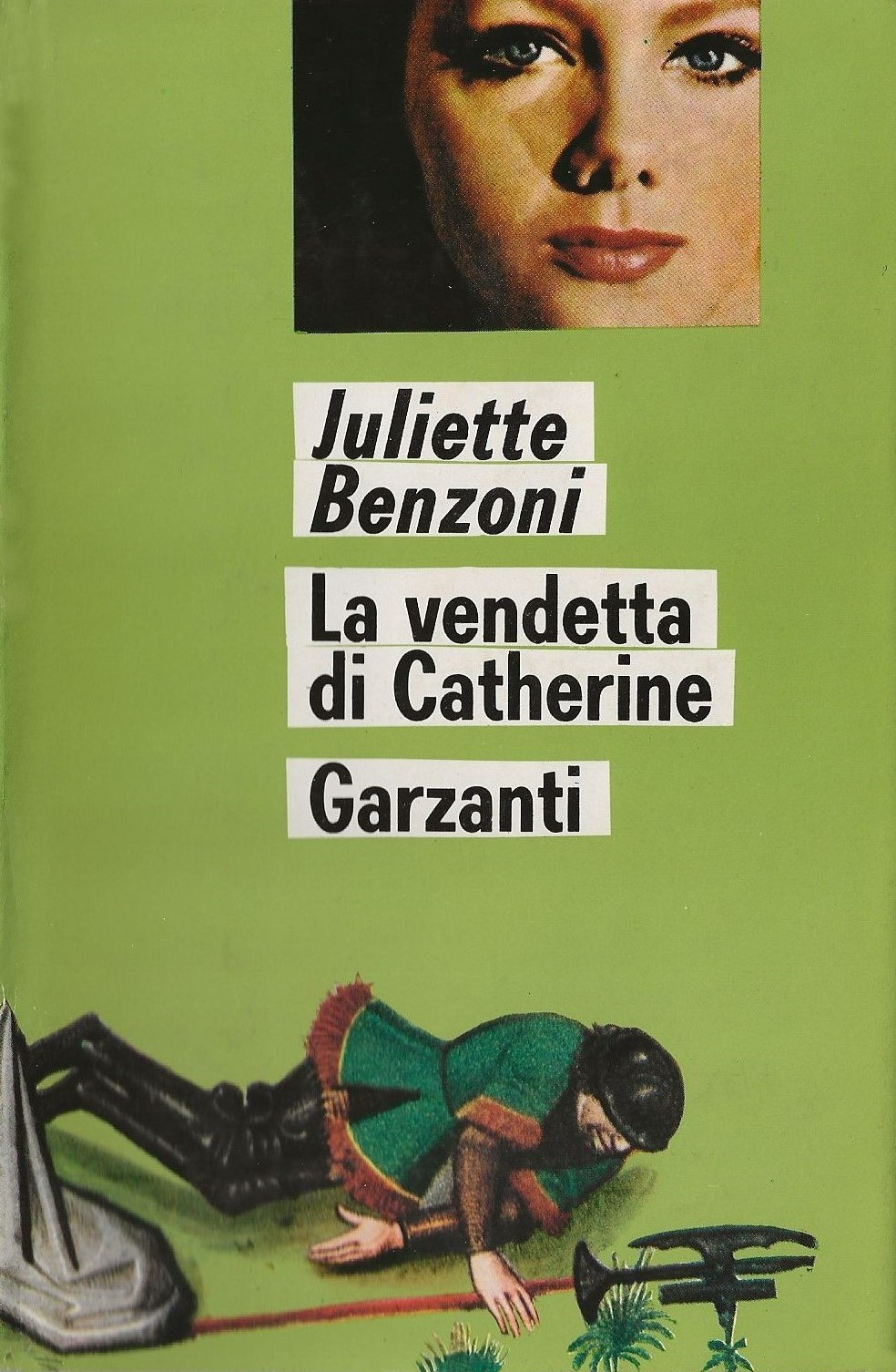
La vendetta di Catherine (1969) corresponds to the second book Her Great Journey Italian book cover artwork by Fulvio Bianconi

Catherine was first released in 1962 as a cliffhanger in the daily newspaper France-Soir, even though the novel was not yet available in stores but the foreign publishing houses bought the rights for Catherine, including West Germany, Holland, Spain, Sweden, Italy, Turkey, Denmark, Finland, Iceland and England.

In the United Kingdom, Heinemann Ltd prepared to publish Catherine on 13 August 1964, Benzoni was invited to a cocktail party in London by Heinemann to launching the first Catherine novel (One Love is Enough), is followed by an interview with BBC radio reporter Leigh Crutchley introducing "Countess Juliette Benzoni di Conza" to the English press, and The Scotsman mentioned Benzoni's trip to London. After the release of Catherine in Great Britain, the American market published Benzoni's series in 1967 with enormous success using different book covers and different titles. As a result, the novels were translated into more than 20 languages and 30 million copies were also sold.

Due to its success, Benzoni was asked to continue with the series, writing further volumes in between other best-sellers; six more adventures of her heroine Catherine. The seventh book of the series (The Lady of Montsalvy) was finally translated four decades later into English in June 2021. Readers had been left in the dark after the end of the sixth book (A Trap for Catherine) a fact which had been unknown to Benzoni, along with the abbreviation of translated titles until some years ago.

All seven novels in both French and English were also available as e-books:

Book No.	French title	English title
1	Il suffit d'un amour (1963)	One Love is Enough (1964)
2	Il suffit d'un amour (1963)	Catherine (1965)
3	Belle Catherine (1966)	
4	Catherine des Grands Chemins (1967)	Her Great Journey (1967) (former title: Catherine and Arnaud)
5	Catherine et le Temps d'Aimer (1968)	A Time for Love (1968)
6	Piège pour Catherine (1973)	A Trap for Catherine (1974) (former title: A Snare for Catherine)
7	La Dame de Montsalvy (1978)	The Lady of Montsalvy (2021)

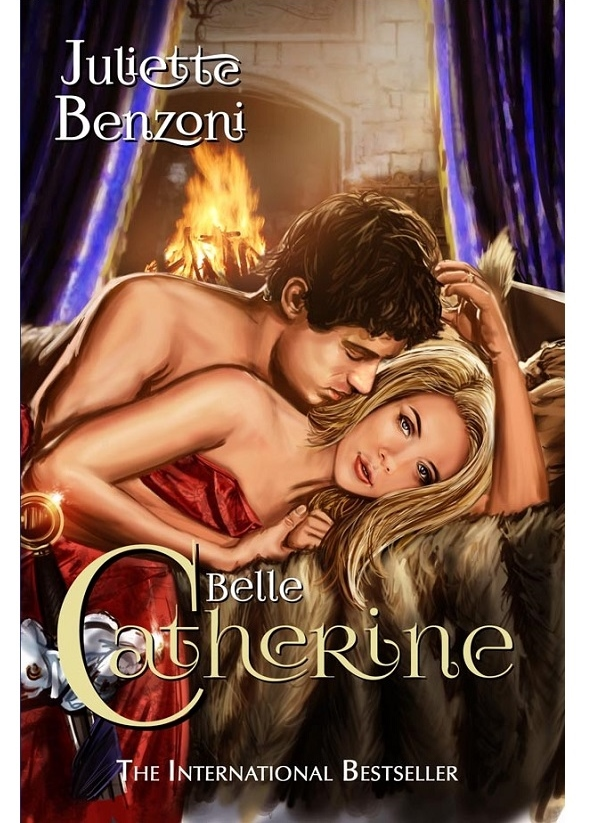
English book cover for Belle Catherine (2017) artwork by Martin Baines

On 21 November 2014, the English publishing house Telos Publishing has bought the rights from Benzoni to re-issue the Catherine saga which included the previous untranslated novel The Lady of Montsalvy. By 1 March 2015, more than 50 years later, four of the seven novels were again published, starting with One Love is Enough and Catherine, followed by 2017, 2020 and 2021 by the other three novels including A Time for Love, A Trap for Catherine and The Lady of Montsalvy as the seventh and final book for the very first time. Telos Publishing announced on their official website that this time the Catherine novels would be unabridged, with the new editions from Telos are also available on Amazon Kindle and other devices.

Simultaneously, the French publisher Pocket re-published the Catherine novels in April 2015 in both paperback and the first time as e-books. Pocket chose for the book covers which features the beautiful "Très Riches Heures du Duc de Berry", famous French Gothic illuminationed manuscripts, which belonged to John, Duke of Berry.

== Characters ==
=== Main characters ===
- Catherine Legoix: the youngest daughter of Gaucher and Jacquette Legoix, living in Paris in the year 1413. When her father is murdered, her mother and sister escape to Burgundy. She grows up to be a ravishing beauty. The heart of the young girl belongs to the noble Arnaud de Montsalvy, who has sworn to kill anyone with the name "Legoix", not knowing that Catherine had tried to save his older brother's life in 1413.
- Arnaud de Montsalvy: a captain in the service of Charles VII. He comes from a very noble family (related to the royal family) and is the son of Amaury and Isabelle Montsalvy, and younger brother to Michel. He is known to be a valiant knight, but with a fierce character. He falls in love with Catherine when they meet the first time. Their road together is paved with many almost insuperable obstacles until he finally learns to what degree Catherine will go to save his life forever.
- Sara: a young gypsy, called Sara the Black, born into a gypsy tribe on the island of Cyprus.
- Philip, Duke of Burgundy: the son of John the Fearless who falls passionately in love with Catherine. To be able to receive her at his court he orders his treasurer to marry her. When her husband dies, she is the Queen of his court. They have together a child named Philippe. When their son dies, Catherine returns to the Kingdom of France.

=== Minor characters ===
- Abou-al-Khayr: a Moorish doctor from Granada who befriends Catherine and Arnaud.
- Barnaby: a beggar who helps Catherine and her family escape to Dijon.
- Garin de Brazey: a treasurer of Dijon and first husband of Catherine.
- Queen Yolande of Aragon: the mother-in-law of Charles VII.
- Charles VII: is the King of France who has razed to the ground and the ancestral family of the castle at Montsalvy in Auvergne were banished from the court.
- Dauphin Louis: is the son of Charles VII and Marie of Anjou.
- Tristan l'Hermite: is one of the conspirators to take Georges de la Trémoille down.
- Arthur de Richemont: constable in the service of King Charles VII.
- Gilles de Rais: a knight and companion-in-arms of Joan of Arc. He betrays Arnaud de Montsalvy and takes Catherine as a prisoner.
- Georges de la Trémoille: is the Grand Chamberlain of France.
- Joan of Arc: a national heroine and military leader on her way to relieve the city of Orléans when Catherine meets her the first time.
- Jean Poton de Xaintrailles: brother-in-arms of Arnaud de Montsalvy and best friend of the Montsalvy's.
- La Hire: a military commander and brother-in-arms of Arnaud de Montsalvy and good friend with Arnaud and Jean de Xaintrailles.
- Count Jean de Dunois, called "the Bastard": is of royal blood and in command of the city of Orléans.
- Jacques Cœur: a merchant from Bourges, husband to Macée de Léodepart.
- Ermengarde de Châteauvillain: is the Countess of Châteauvillain and a close friend of Catherine.
- Mathieu Gautherin: the brother of Jacquette Legoix and uncle to Loyse and Catherine.
- Muhammed VIII: is the Caliph of Granada.
- Princess Zobeïda: ambassadress and sister of the Caliph of Granada.

=== The Legoix family ===
- Gaucher: the husband of Jacquette Gautherin and father of Loyse and Catherine.
- Jacquette: is the wife of Gaucher Legoix and mother to Loyse and Catherine.
- Loyse: the older sister of Catherine who wants to become a nun.
- Thomas: a rich butcher and cousin to Gaucher Legoix. He supports not King Charles VI, but the Duke of Burgundy, John the Fearless.
- Berthe: the wife of Thomas and cousin to Jacquette, Loyse and Catherine.

=== The Montsalvy family ===
- Amaury: the father of Michel and Arnaud.
- Isabelle: the mother of Michel and Arnaud, widowed at an early age.
- Michel: a young noble, page in the household of the Dauphin, Louis Duke of Guyenne.
- Marie de Comborn: Countess Isabelle de Montsalvy's niece from the Ventatour family and cousin to Arnaud.

== Critical reception ==
In 1963, the French daily newspapers such as Le Figaro and France-Soir wrote in their reviews for the first Catherine novel: "Before the novel was even available in book stores it beats all records and is already sold to ten different countries. It has an unprecedented destiny in the history of publishing". On 10 June 1964, after the second volume was released the headline read in Le Provençal: "A heroine... who takes place... alongside of Scarlett O'Hara".

On 10 July 1964, Henri de Montfort, French historian, writer, and journalist, confirmed in Ici Paris: "This is a very enthralling novel of which one can say that it deserves the term "Romanesque" which is the best guarantee to keep a reader spellbound with pleasure and emotion during reading. Worth mentioning are the excellent treasury of words and of style". Heinemann Ltd from England sent a telegram to Benzoni with the text: Congratulations – every success – with Belle Catherine - Heinemann. In 1967, the American book cover read: "Juliette Benzoni's Belle Catherine – A ravishing heroine in the full-blooded tradition of Désirée and Angélique, over 500,000 copies sold!"

In 1973, ten years after the first volume of Catherine appeared, Alain Decaux, acclaimed French historian, and member of the Académie Française, wrote in his foreword for Benzoni's book Par le Fer ou le Poison: "Thanks to you, I followed Catherine's burning adventures... I know how you work, how you prepare yourself. I know you have spent five years collecting material for Catherine. That you have gone through three hundreds of books, made hundreds of notepads". Also in the same year, Benzoni received the "Literature" category at the Prix Alexandre-Dumas for her complete work at that time, the Catherine and Marianne series.

On 8 February 2016, Vincent Meylan, journalist, historian and author, wrote in his obituary about Juliette Benzoni:

"The Queen is dead" — Catherine, the first heroine, the one with whom everything began half a century ago, is crying in her chamber in the Montsalvy donjon... and it does not matter if I know the end of all her books! So, if you are like me, a little or very sad about the death of Queen Juliette, re-read her 86 novels and stories...

== Adaptations ==
=== Film ===
The first two novels adapted for the film version with its title Catherine, il suffit d'un amour was released on 23 April 1969 by French director Bernard Borderie and starring Olga Georges-Picot as the main character. The film was a total failure and the story has been completely changed had all of sudden become a rebellious student from 1413. Benzoni withdrew her name from the credits and has often repeated that she "cried like a fountain" when she saw the film.

=== Television ===
The Catherine books were adapted for television is produced by Antenne 2 (later France 2) from 19 March to 11 June 1986, consisting a total of 60 episodes and ran for 26 minutes under the direction of Marion Sarraut. The script was written by Benzoni with Jean Chatenet, and it was the longest series on French television and the media said about it: "Catherine, that is Dallas at the time of Joan of Arc".

In Poland, the 1986 television series was shown on TVP1 from 2 April to 9 July 1989. It was known as the Polish title Katarzyna, and it contained a total of 15 episodes which ran approximately 90 minutes each.

In December 2007, the French book sales club France Loisirs released the entire series on DVD with the complete collection consisting of five boxes in ten discs. The covers of the DVD boxes displayed images from the 1986 television series, but there were no English subtitles, special features, nor extra elements included. Eventually, the DVD version of the television series – originally consisting of 60 episodes and 26 minutes – were reduced to 30 episodes of 52 minutes each.

== See also ==
- Cultural depictions of Joan of Arc
- Middle Ages in popular culture
