= Loÿs Papon =

Loÿs Papon (1533–1599) was a French playwright born in Montbrison in the Forez province.

== Short biography ==
The son of Jean Papon, lieutenant general of the bailiffs of Forez, he was a devout Catholic, a canon at Notre-Dame d'Espérance of Montbrison, then abbot of Marcilly. He animated a small literary circle, sometimes in the Goutelas castle inherited from his father, sometimes at the Château de la Bastie d'Urfé.

We still have a didactic poem from him, Traité des ris, an Epistre à Tres Illustre Princesse Loyse, Reyne de France, and tragedies, in particular La Pastorelle, a politico-religious spectacle which was presented on 27 February 1588 in Montbrison and is considered the first French opera.

He was the model for the druid Adamas in L'Astrée.

== Works ==
- La Pastorelle sur les victoires obtenues contre les Allemands, reytres, lansquenets suisses et français, rebelles à Dieu et au roi très chrétien l'an 1588.

== See also ==
- French renaissance literature
