= Middle Ages in popular culture =

500-1500 CE settings in books, tv and film

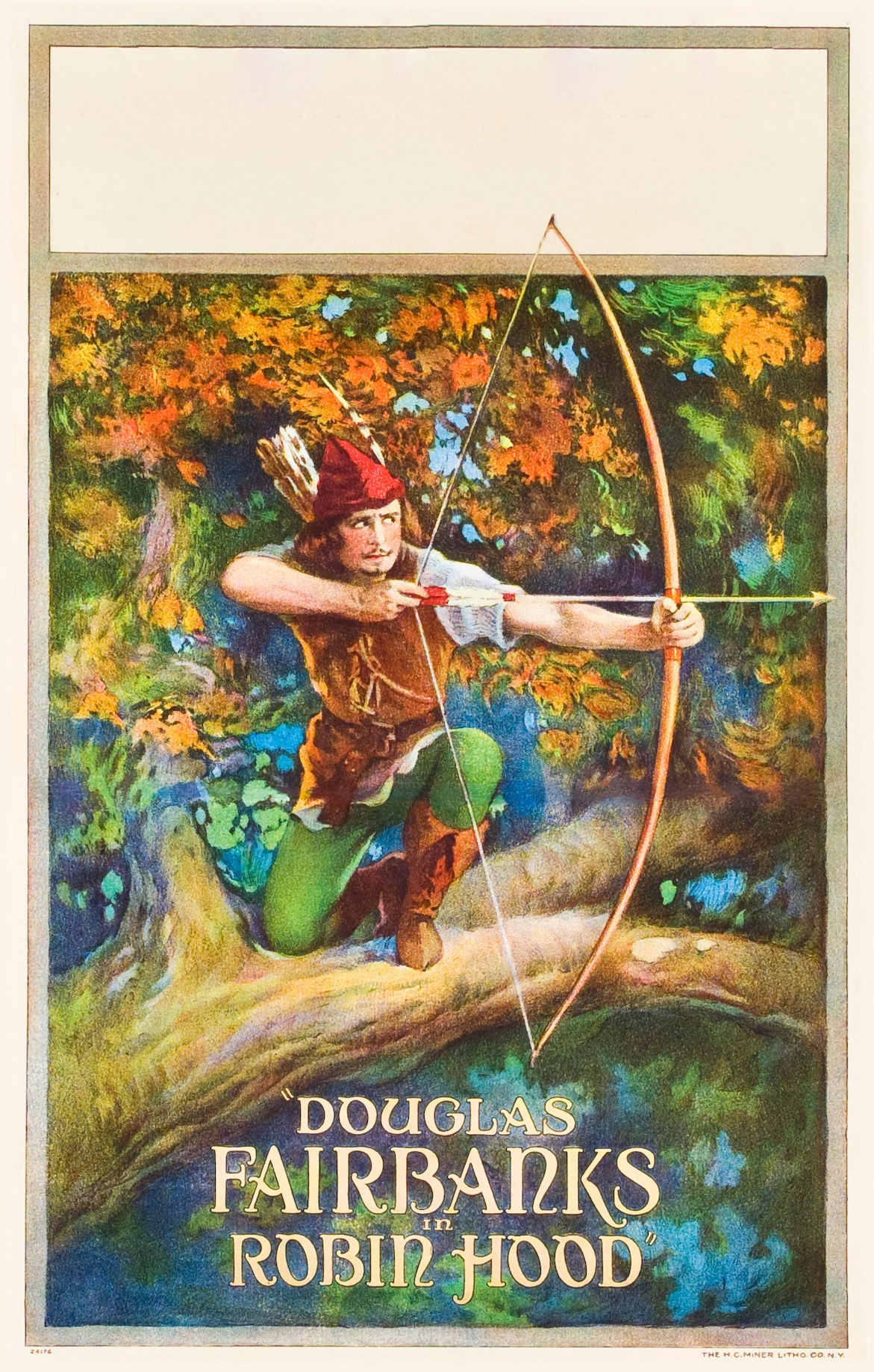
The 1922 film poster for Douglas Fairbanks in Robin Hood, starring Douglas Fairbanks

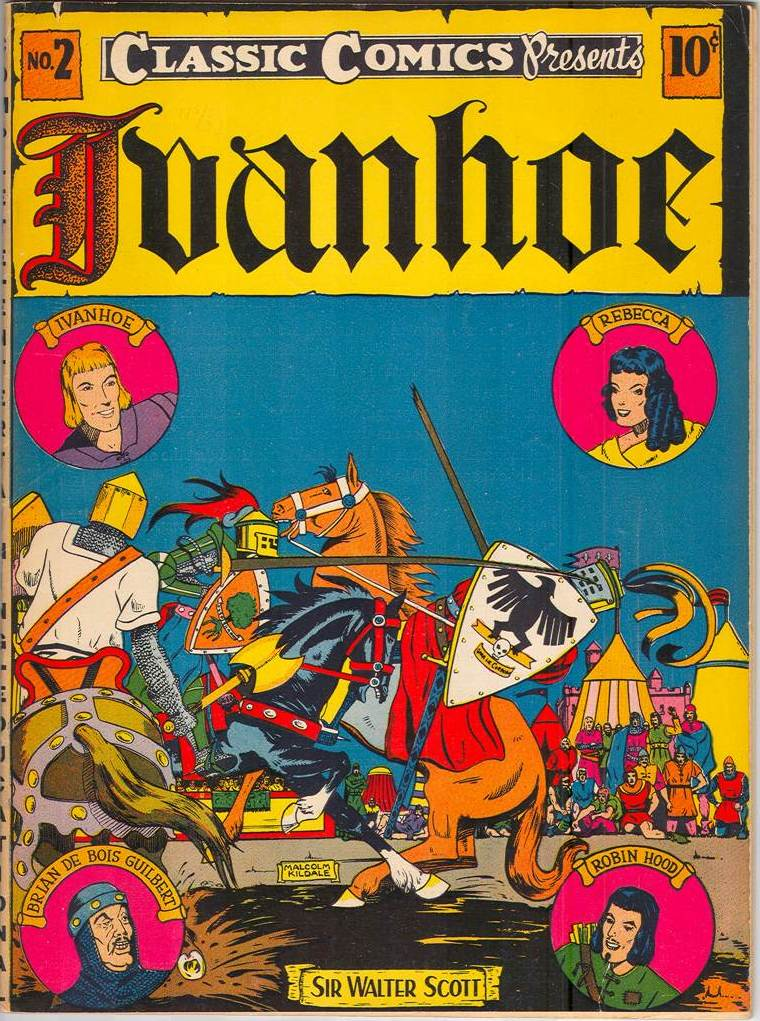
1941 comic adaptation of Walter Scott's 1819 novel, Ivanhoe

Representations of the Middle Ages frequently occur in cultural media, from literature, drama, and film to comics, reenactment, music, and video games. Examples include:

General

- Historical reenactment
- Medievalism and Neo-medievalism
- Middle Ages in film
- Neo-medieval music
- Dark Ages in modern non-scholarly use

Early Middle Ages

- List of translations and artistic depictions of Beowulf
- King Arthur in various media
- Lady Godiva in popular culture
- Irish mythology in popular culture
- Vikings in popular culture
- Viking revival
- Norse mythology in popular culture

High Middle Ages

- Knights Templar and popular culture
- Robin Hood in popular culture
- List of films and television series featuring Robin Hood

Late Middle Ages

- Knight-errant
- Cultural depictions of Joan of Arc

Islamic Golden Age

- Scheherazade in popular culture
- One Thousand and One Nights in world culture
