= Silver Skates =

1943 film by Leslie Goodwins

- Directed by: Leslie Goodwins
- Written by: Jerome Cady
- Produced by: Lindsley Parsons
- Starring: Kenny Baker; Belita; Patricia Morison
- Cinematography: Mack Stengler
- Edited by: Richard C. Currier
- Music by: Mahlon Merrick; Edward J. Kay
- Production company: Monogram Pictures
- Distributed by: Monogram Pictures
- Release date: February 26, 1943
- Running time: 78 minutes
- Country: United States
- Language: English
- Budget: $300,000

Silver Skates is a 1943 American musical film directed by Leslie Goodwins and starring Kenny Baker, Belita and Patricia Morison.

== Cast ==
- Kenny Baker as Danny Donovan
- Belita as Belita
- Patricia Morison as Claire Thomas
- Werner Groebli as Frick, Comedy Skating Act Frick and Frack
- Hans Mauch as Frack, Comedy Skating Act Frick and Frack
- Irene Dare as Juvenile Skater Katrina
- Danny Shaw as Juvenile Skater Billy Baxter
- Eugene Turner as 1941 National Skating Champion
- Joyce Compton as Lucille
- Frank Faylen as Eddie
- Paul McVey as Roscoe Hayes
- John Maxwell as Blake
- Henry Wadsworth as Tom
- George Eugene Stewart as Jitterbug Skater
- JoAnn Dean as Herself (Jitterbug Skater)
- Ted Fio Rito Orchestra as Themselves
- Ruth Lee as Mrs. Martin

== Reception ==
The film was a box office success.

== Bibliography ==
- Michael L. Stephens. Art Directors in Cinema: A Worldwide Biographical Dictionary. McFarland, 1998.
