= Suspense (1946 film) =

1946 film by Frank Tuttle

- Theatrical release poster
- Directed by: Frank Tuttle
- Written by: Philip Yordan
- Produced by: Frank and Maurice King
- Starring: Barry Sullivan; Belita; Bonita Granville; Albert Dekker; Eugene Pallette
- Cinematography: Karl Struss
- Edited by: Richard V. Heermance; Otho Lovering (supervising editor)
- Music by: Daniele Amfitheatrof
- Production company: King Brothers Productions
- Distributed by: Monogram Pictures
- Release date: June 15, 1946
- Running time: 101 minutes
- Country: United States
- Language: English
- Budget: $870,000

Suspense is a 1946 American ice-skating-themed film noir directed by Frank Tuttle and written by Philip Yordan. The film stars Barry Sullivan and former Olympic skater Belita. The supporting cast features Albert Dekker, Bonita Granville, and Eugene Pallette (in his final film role).

Following their unexpected success with Dillinger, Frank and Maurice King convinced Monogram Pictures to back a higher-budgeted film noir picture written by Yordan. The film was promoted as Monogram's "first million-dollar picture."

Suspense was released by Monogram Pictures on June 15, 1946. Although it received mixed reviews from critics, it was considered a box office success. The Kings reunited Sullivan and Belita the following year in The Gangster which was less successful.

== Plot ==
Joe Morgan is a drifter who has come to Los Angeles from New York. He attempts to get a job from Max, whose brother was an acquaintance of his, but he is unable to. Scruffy, broke, and looking for work, he is directed by Max to a nearby theater featuring an ice show starring Roberta Elva. The theater's assistant Harry Wheeler introduces Morgan to the theater's owner and show producer Frank Leonard. Leonard hires Morgan to sell peanuts. Morgan watches Roberta's performance, and is immediately taken with her. He tries to strike up a conversation after the show, but she is driven away by Leonard. Harry tells Morgan the two are married.

When Leonard is frustrated by the lack of excitement in Roberta's routine, Morgan suggests a new act for the show involving Roberta leaping full speed through a circle of long sharp knives. His suggestion earns him a promotion to a managerial position. Roberta continues to reject Morgan's advances, becoming angry after Morgan abruptly kisses her in his office. Leonard then leaves Morgan in charge of the theater while he goes off to Chicago on a business trip. While Leonard is away, Morgan continues to pursue Roberta, who continues to reject him before softening. Returning to his apartment one night, Morgan is surprised and angered to discover Ronnie, a jilted girlfriend from Chicago, has broken into his apartment. She makes it known she is still interested in him, and informs him she has moved in across the hall.

When Leonard returns from his trip, he begins to suspect Morgan's attraction to Roberta. He takes her away for a winter vacation at his remote mountain cabin, which angers Morgan. Morgan unexpectedly arrives at the cabin with some papers for Leonard to sign, a ruse for seeing Roberta. Leonard invites him to spend the night since it is too late to travel for accommodations, and later catches Morgan and Roberta embracing. As Morgan accompanies Roberta to a frozen pond to watch her practice the following morning, Leonard sneaks up an adjacent mountainside with a hunting rifle. He shoots at Morgan but misses, triggering an avalanche that carries him away. When the couple return to Los Angeles, Roberta is heartbroken and haunted by the feeling that they are being watched. She is convinced by Harry to continue the show with Morgan's name now in lights atop the marquee.

Over the next few months, Morgan becomes increasingly distant and hostile to Harry and Roberta as he becomes increasingly suspicious whether Leonard actually died in the avalanche. He becomes convinced something is up when he discovers Leonard's ring in his champagne glass at a party at Roberta’s penthouse. Ronnie grows increasingly jealous as Morgan and Roberta's affair becomes more open. She arranges from Max, an acquaintance of Morgan's whose brother knew him in New York, to find out why Morgan left New York in such a hurry.

One night while working late at his office, Morgan is approached by a shadowy figure. From outside, Roberta hears sounds of an apparent struggle from Morgan's office. When she goes to investigate, she finds Morgan locking a large roll-top desk that had previously always been left open. She also finds a pipe like the one smoked by Leonard, but Morgan assures her that it's his. Morgan returns to his apartment to find Ronnie, who reveals her recent investigation into his past. She tells him she has the answers, and what she does with it "depends on you." This leads Morgan to violently assault her. Harry visits to find the cause of the ruckus, and notices "red stuff" on Morgan's jacket.

The next day, Harry finds that the desk has been replaced by a new one, and Morgan brusquely explains that he'd had the old one hauled off and burned in the building's furnace. Harry voices his concerns to Roberta, who becomes suspicious after finding out Leonard's pipes were custom made. She goes to the basement to investigate, where she is caught by Morgan. He confesses that he killed Leonard and had his body incinerated. She tells Morgan that she will not turn him in to the police, but that he must confess himself; he refuses.

Morgan becomes increasingly paranoid, particularly after Roberta informs him he will be quitting the show. Ronnie is also pushed over the edge by Morgan’s continuous rejections of her advances. Worried that Roberta will go to the police, Morgan loosens one of the long knives used in her act, which slides into the path of her jump. At the last moment in her performance, he has second thoughts and suddenly yanks the prop clear. Retreating through the stage door, he is set to flee his predicament, but is confronted by Ronnie. Distraught, she shoots him to death. As the camera pans away from the scene, the lights spelling out "Joe Morgan" on the theater marquee go black.

== Cast ==
- Belita as Roberta Leonard, aka Roberta Elva
- Barry Sullivan as Joe Morgan
- Bonita Granville as Ronnie
- Albert Dekker as Frank Leonard
- Eugene Pallette as Harry Wheeler
- George E. Stone as Max
- Edith Angold as Nora
- Leon Belasco as Pierre Yasha
- Miguelito Valdés as himself, a Cuban singer

Uncredited

- Cay Forrester as party guest
- Byron Foulger as cab driver
- Arthur Gardner as party guest
- Billy Gray as Little Boy at Zoo
- Sid Melton as Smiles
- Marion Martin as Shooting Gallery blonde
- Nestor Paiva as man with blonde
- Dewey Robinson as man with blonde
- Frank J. Scannell as Monk
- Philip Yordan as party guest

== Production ==
Suspense was filmed from October to December 1945. The film was initially titled Glamour Girl before being changed. Morris King described the film as "a psychological treatment of Crime and Punishment."

Musical numbers include:

- "Eas'-Side Boogie," by Tommy Reilly
- "With You in My Arms," by Dunham and Alexander, sung by Bobby Ramos
- "Ice Cuba," with Miguelito Valdes, singing "Cabildo"

== Reception ==
According to Variety in January 1947, the film performed very well at the box office for Monogram.

=== Critical response ===
Upon release, New York Times critic Bosley Crowther reviewed the film caustically, writing, "The Monogram people are so puffed up by the fact that their new film, Suspense, which came yesterday to the Victoria, is their first 'million-dollar release' that we wonder why some boastful genius didn't give it the title 'Expense.' At least, such a tag would betoken the little there is in this film and it wouldn't provoke expectation of something that isn't there. For, apart from some ice-skating numbers (which presumably cost all that coin), it has nothing to recommend it—let alone the thing of which the title speaks ... Frank Tuttle was the director from a script by Philip Yordan. Neither of their contributions is in the million-dollar class."

In 2019, film critic Dennis Schwartz panned the film in his review, writing, "Monogram's most expensive film to date, produced by the King Brothers (Maurice and Frank) ... The heavy melodrama is suggestive of a nightmare. It is ruined by its leaden pace, lack of suspense, unpleasant characters, and unconvincing script. The film felt like a truck stuck on the ice, noisily moving back and forth to get some traction."
