= Paul Lewis Anderson =

American photographer and writer (1880–1956)

Paul Lewis Anderson (1880–1956) was an American photographer and author who wrote five young adult historical fiction novels focusing on ancient Rome and two young adult novels about life in a New England boys' prep school. He also wrote numerous outdoors-oriented short stories for magazines such as Boys' Life and The Outdoorsman.

== Life and work ==
Anderson was born in Trenton, New Jersey. He attended Lehigh University, where he was a member of the gymnastics team, specializing in the flying rings. He graduated in 1901 and worked in electrical engineering before taking up photography in 1907. He was influenced by the photographs in the magazine Camera Work. In 1910 he started working as a professional photographer. A self-taught photographer, Anderson worked within the mainstream pictorialist aesthetic of his day. Yet at the same time, drawing upon his engineering background, he applied a methodical and experimental approach within his creative process in order to advance his artistic ideals. Anderson was close friends with Karl Struss, whose positive meniscus Struss Pictorial Lens he favored.

In 1910, Anderson married Mary Lyon Green, with whom he had two daughters, born in 1912 and 1916.

Prior to World War I, he operated portrait studios in New York City and East Orange, New Jersey. In 1916 and 1917, he taught at the Clarence H. White School of Photography, founded by Clarence Hudson White, 1914–1918, and published several books and articles on photography. In 1920 Anderson began to write short fiction for magazines, including Argosy. For Argosy Anderson wrote adventure stories set in prehistorical times, called the "Ta-an" series. Anderson set aside his writing on photography in 1925 to focus more on fiction, beginning with short stories and two novels about student life at a boys' prep school in the fictional New England town of Lockport; he later followed with the five novels of his Roman Life and Times series, which have never been out of print since their initial publication. He returned to writing on photography some eight years later, at the same time continuing his fiction-writing career, which came to a close in 1939 with the publication of Pugnax the Gladiator.

According to family lore as related by his elder daughter, Anderson was good friends with Edward Weston. The two disagreed vehemently on photographic style with regard to the artistic value of sharp focus (Weston's preference) versus soft focus (Anderson's style). Anderson put an end to the disagreement by producing a wire-sharp picture of a dead mackerel on a plate.

Some of his photography is displayed at the Cleveland Museum of Art.

== Influence ==
Biographer of Robert E. Howard, Rusty Burke, has argued that Anderson's "Ta-an" stories influenced Howard's fiction. Burke notes that Howard's unpublished poem "Am-ra of the Ta-an" borrows some names from Anderson's work. Howard's first published story, "Spear and Fang" (1925) is a prehistoric adventure similar to Anderson's "Ta-an" tales. Pulp magazine historian Morgan Holmes has also postulated that Anderson's "Ta-an" tales influenced the prehistoric adventure tales of both Robert E. Howard and C. M. Eddy Jr.

== Selected bibliography ==
=== Photography books ===
- Anderson, Paul Lewis (1914). Pictorial Landscape-Photography.
- Anderson, Paul Lewis (1917). Pictorial Photography: Its Principles and Practice. Phila. &c.
- Anderson, Paul Lewis (1919). The Fine Art of Photography. Lippincott.

=== Novels ===
- Anderson, Paul Lewis (1927). The Cub Arrives.

A spoiled and wild young man arrives as a new student at a fine New England boys' prep school, gets into trouble, and is put in the charge of one of the older students for a summer of re-education. (Out of print.)

- Anderson, Paul Lewis (1928). Half Pint Shannon.

A hardworking but financially disadvantaged young man achieves his goal of admission to a fine New England boys' prep school, works hard but is beset by misfortunes and difficulties. (Out of print.)

- Anderson, Paul Lewis (1929). With the Eagles. ISBN 978-0-8196-0100-1.

The conquest of Gaul and the figures of Caesar and his generals as well as aspects of the Roman army are presented in a personal way through the eyes of a young legionary soldier.

- Anderson, Paul Lewis (1930). Slave of Catiline. ISBN 978-0-8196-0101-8.

A young slave is confronted by the conspiracy of his master Catiline.

- Anderson, Paul Lewis (1931). For Freedom and for Gaul. ISBN 978-0-8196-0102-5.

A stirring novel of Vercingertorix, defender of the Gauls against Caesar’s invasion. From the view point of a young Gaul with Roman associations.

- Anderson, Paul Lewis (1938). Swords in the North. ISBN 978-0-8196-0103-2.

Gaius, a young Roman aristocrat in Caesar’s Tenth Legion, takes part in the invasion of Britain, is captured, and designated for sacrifice by the Druids; only a British princess can save him.

- Anderson, Paul Lewis (1939). Pugnax the Gladiator. ISBN 978-0-8196-0104-9.

Dumnorix the Aeduan, sold into slavery and given the Roman name of Pugnax ("Fond of Fighting"), becomes a gladiator at Rome and encounters undreamed of adventures.

=== Novellas and Short Stories ===
- Anderson, Paul L. (1920, January 31). "The Son of the Red God." Argosy 117, no. 2 (novella, part of the "Ta-an" series).
- Anderson, Paul L. (1920, March 6). "The Lord of the Winged Death." Argosy 118, no. 3 (novella, part of the "Ta-an" series).
- Anderson, Paul L. (1920, May 8). "The Cave That Swims on the Water." Argosy 120, no. 4 (novella, part of the "Ta-an" series).
- Anderson, Paul L. (1920, July 17). "The Master of Magic." Argosy 123, no. 2 (novella, part of the "Ta-an" series).
- Anderson, Paul L. (1920, August 28). "Wings of the Snow." Argosy All-Story Weekly 124, no. 4 (novella, part of the "Ta-an" series).
- Anderson, Paul L. (1920, December 4). "Snow." Argosy All-Story Weekly 128, no. 2 (short story).
- Anderson, Paul L. (1920, December 18). "Rain." Argosy All-Story Weekly 128, no. 4 (short story).
- Anderson, Paul L. (1921, September 18). "The Tyrant Saurian." Adventure 30, no. 6 (short story).
- Anderson, Paul L. (1921, September 25). "The Hellcat." Short Stories 96, no. 6 (short story).
- Anderson, Paul L. (1922, March 20). "The Clear Flame of Courage." Adventure 33, no. 5 (short story).
- Anderson, Paul L. (1922, April 1). "Courage—Two Kinds." Argosy All-Story Weekly 141, no. 5 (short story).
- Anderson, Paul L. (1922, April 20). "The Asphalt Pool." Adventure 34, no. 2 (short story).
- Anderson, Paul L. (1924, March 22). "Up from the Abyss." Argosy All-Story Weekly 158, no. 6 (novella, part of the "Ta-an" series).
- Anderson, Paul L. (1926, January 16). "The Trampling Horde." Argosy All-Story Weekly 174, no 5 (novella, part of the "Ta-an" series).
- Anderson, Paul Lewis (2023). The Son of the Red God and Other Tales of the Ta-an, Volume One. Steeger Books. ISBN 978-1-6182-7754-1.
