= Clarence Hudson White =

American photographer

Clarence H. White
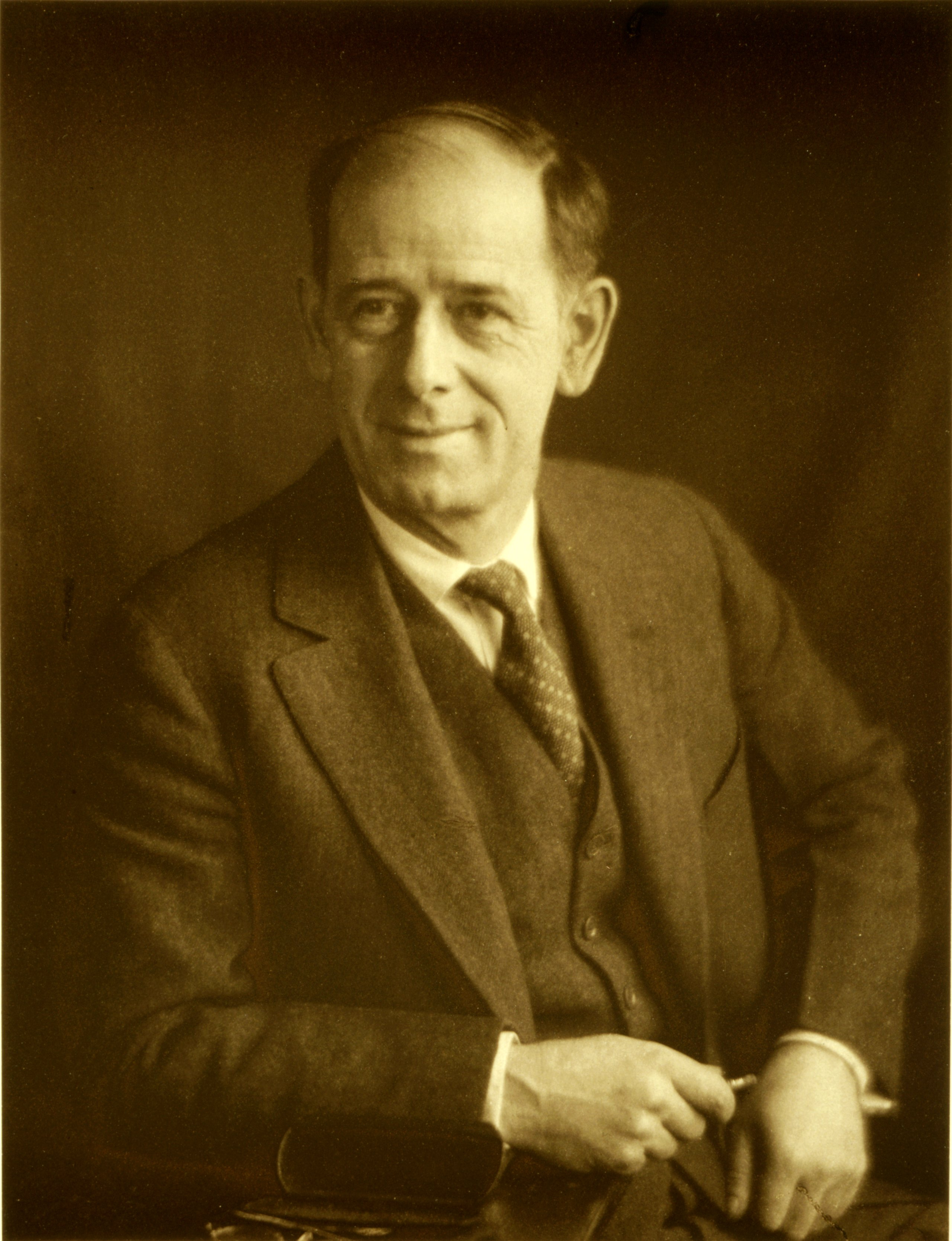
- Born: Clarence Hudson White; April 8, 1871; West Carlisle, Ohio, U.S.
- Died: July 7, 1925 (aged 54); Mexico City, Mexico
- Known for: Photography
- Spouse: Jane Felix

Clarence Hudson White (April 8, 1871 – July 8, 1925) was an American photographer, teacher and a founding member of the Photo-Secession movement. He grew up in small towns in Ohio, where his primary influences were his family and the social life of rural America. After visiting the World's Columbian Exposition in Chicago in 1893, he took up photography. Although he was completely self-taught in the medium, within a few years he was internationally known for his pictorial photographs that captured the spirit and sentimentality of America in the early twentieth century. As he became well known for his images, White was sought out by other photographers who often traveled to Ohio to learn from him. He became friends with Alfred Stieglitz and helped advance the cause of photography as a true art form. In 1906 White and his family moved to New York City in order to be closer to Stieglitz and his circle and to further promote his own work. While there he became interested in teaching photography and in 1914 he established the Clarence H. White School of Photography, the first educational institution in America to teach photography as art. Due to the demands of his teaching duties, his own photography declined and White produced little new work during the last decade of his life. In 1925 he suffered a heart attack and died while teaching students in Mexico City.

== Life ==
=== 1871–1893: Early years ===
White was born in 1871 in West Carlisle, Ohio, the second son and youngest child of Lewis Perry White and Phebe Billman White. He was raised in what was known as "The American House," a large tavern built by his great-grandfather and Ohio pioneer settler Augustine White in 1817. His childhood was described as "idyllic", and, unlike many children of the time, he grew up in good health and with no deaths or tragedies in his family. He and his brother Pressley, who was two years older, spent much of their time playing in the fields and hills near their small hometown.

When White was sixteen the family moved to the small town of Newark, Ohio, where his father accepted a job as traveling salesman for the wholesale grocery firm of Fleek and Neal. With his father gone much of the time White was left to pursue his own interests, and he became a serious student of the violin. From his late teens into his mid-twenties White kept a diary in which recorded both the events of his days and also his interests and opinions. He wrote increasingly of his interest in music and pictorial arts; there is no mention of photography in his diaries of this period.

After high school White became a bookkeeper at the firm where his father worked. He was a diligent worker, but his job gave him little opportunity to pursue his artistic interests. He wrote that he reported to work at 7 am six days a week and left at 6 in the evening, sometimes working on Sundays when things were really busy. His maternal uncle Ira Billman, who was a published poet, encouraged White to continue developing his creative skills, and by 1890 White was producing sketchbooks filled with pencil sketches, pen-and-ink drawings and watercolors.

Some of the artistic vision White developed during this time he later applied to his photography. He learned how to use light, or the lack of it, to draw attention to his subject. He also learned how to visualize his subjects in his mind. White's grandson and biographer Maynard Pressley White Jr. noted that among his grandfather's sketches of this time was a drawing of a female nude seated on a large sphere, blowing bubbles from a pipe and surrounded by many floating spheres in the air. This same imagery later appeared repeatedly in White's photography.

It was through his musical interests that White met his future wife, Jane Felix (1869–1943), sometime in 1891–92. She was a schoolteacher, and his diaries contain notes about his taking her on dates to concerts in at nearby Denison University and in Columbus, Ohio. White recorded no other love interests in his diaries, and on June 14, 1893, he married Felix in Newark at the unusual hour of 6 am. Family records offer no indication of why the ceremony was held at that time, but within an hour after they exchanged vows White and his bride boarded a train bound for Chicago where they attended the World's Columbian Exposition. The Exposition was the single largest architectural, artistic, musical, and technological attraction of its time, with more than 26 million visitors, and it attracted people from all walks of life. It was there that he first encountered photography as a public medium. Not only were there multiple very large exhibits showing photographers from around the world, there were many camera and darkroom equipment manufacturers displaying and selling their latest goods, dozens of portrait studios and even on-the-spot documentation of the Exposition itself. It was a non-stop immersion course into the world of photography at the turn of the century.

=== 1893–1899: Becoming a photographer ===
White did not record how soon he took up photography after he and his wife returned to Newark, but it had to have been quickly. There are at least two photographs taken by him that date from that same year, 1893, and by the following year he was deeply engaged in his new interest. White's grandson wrote, "It is not coincidental that Clarence White's life in photography began in the year of his marriage. My grandmother wore a great many hats, and all with real flair; she was wife, mother, business manager, model, aesthetic critic, stoic, and a buffer between my grandfather and many of the unpleasantnesses of life. With steadfast devotion, she created an environment in which he could lead a calm and productive life." The considerable influence of his wife in White's artistic development may be seen later when he began corresponding with Alfred Stieglitz; White often used the words "we" or "Mrs. White and I" when describing his most recent photographic activities.

When White and his wife returned to Newark, they were not in a prosperous situation. In order to make ends meet he and his bride moved in with his parents, and he continued to work long hours at his bookkeeping job. He initially had no interest in pursuing photography as a possible career, and even after he became successful he continued to work as a bookkeeper for many years. Most of his earnings went to providing for his family, and his early involvement in photography was financially challenging. Later his student Ralph Steiner recalled that White told him during this period he had money for only two glass plate negatives each week, and he would spend every spare moment planning what he would do with those two plates on his weekend."

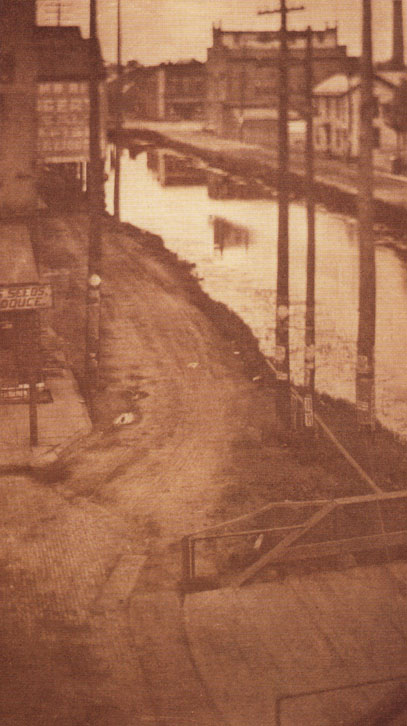
Telegraph Poles 1898

White was completely self-taught throughout his career, in part because he had no money to pay for training or courses at the time when he was developing his own vision in the medium. Many of his friends, students and biographers believe his lack of any formal training was one of his greatest strengths. When a one-man exhibition of his work was held in Newark in 1899, fellow Newark photographer Ema Spencer wrote "He has been remote from artistic influences and is absolutely untrained in the art of the schools. In consequence, traditional lines have unconsciously been ignored and he has followed his own personal bent because he has been impelled by that elusive and inscrutable force commonly known as genius." It is also important to note that at that time there were no formal schools of photography in the U.S. or even acknowledged leaders with whom White might have studied. The most common way a new photographer learned the trade was by working with an experienced photographer, and, other than a few portraitists, there was no one to learn from in Newark.

In 1895 their first son, Lewis Felix White, was born, followed by a second son, Maynard Pressley White, a year later. By the time Maynard was born the Whites had moved to their own house, probably due to the generosity of Mrs. White's father, John Felix, who owned several properties in Newark. By this time White demonstrated enough accomplishment in his photography that he exhibited his first photos in public, at the Camera Club of Fostoria, Ohio.

A year later he received a Gold Medal at the Ohio Photographers Association exhibition in Columbus. Records do not indicate which photographs won the award for White, but two of them were almost certainly Study (Leticia Felix) and The Readers, for which he also won the Grand Prize at the First International Salon in Pittsburgh. Sculptor Lorado Taft saw White's work in Columbus and wrote "White knew nothing about the technic [sic] of photography, but the artists went wild over his pictures. I saw, and went wild too!."

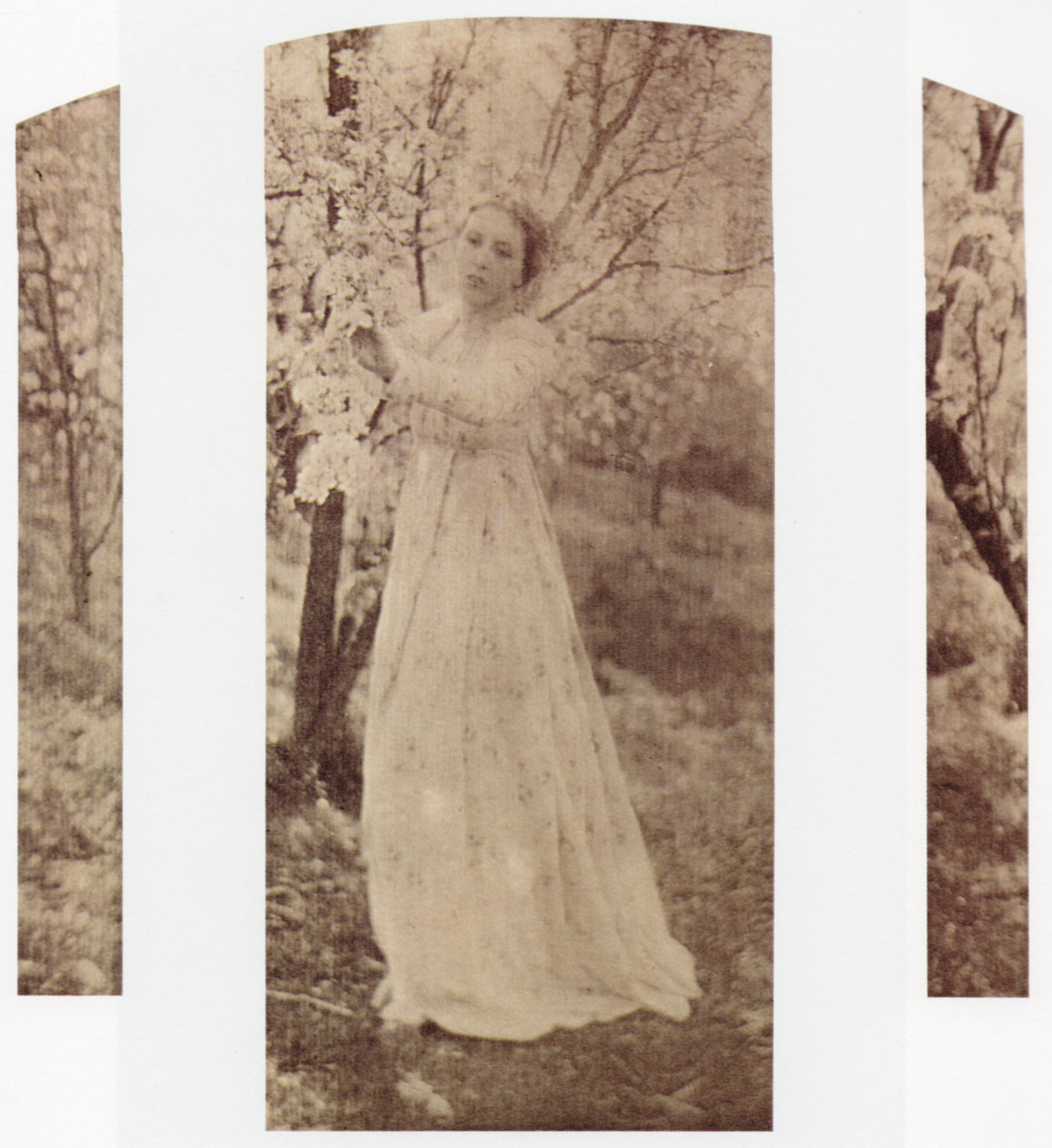
Spring – A Triptych 1898

In 1898 White's fame continued to rise. His photographs reproduced for the first time in national publications (The Photographic Times, Harper's Magazine, and Brush and Pencil), and he traveled to the east coast to discuss the state of photography as an art with his colleagues. In Philadelphia, in conjunction with the First Philadelphia Photographic Salon, he met with F. Holland Day and Joseph Keiley, and in New York he met Alfred Stieglitz. The latter would remain close friends for several more years.

What is remarkable about this period in White's life is the fact that his limited finances allowed him to create only about 8 photographs each month, yet the quality of those images was so consistently high that he quickly received widespread acclaim for his work. He also worked under very difficult conditions. Due to the long hours at his bookkeeping job, he convinced family and friends to model for him in the evening or very early in the morning, even though they sometimes had to awake as early as 4 am in the summer in order to pose for him before he went to work.

In 1898 alone White created several photographs that are among his most acclaimed, including The Bubble, Telegraph Poles, Girl with Harp, Blind Man's Bluff, and Spring ‒ A Triptych.

==== The Newark Camera Club ====
In order to advance his own knowledge of photography and to encourage others in his small home town, in 1898 White brought together a group of 10 local people to form the Newark Camera Club. All of its members, including White at that time, were amateur photographers who shared an active interest in pictorialism, but it was White's leadership that soon propelled the club's influence far beyond a small town in Ohio. Ema Spencer, a club member and later member of the Photo-Secession wrote that the club "was known in photographic circles here and abroad as 'the White School', a reflection of White's stature and prominence. A goal of the Club was to have at least one major show of its members' work each year, but also to show the work of "photographers from the east as well as abroad, so their own work would profit from the examination and comparison."

Through White's influence and connections, the very next year the club mounted a large exhibit at the local YMCA that included prints by Alfred Stieglitz, F. Holland Day, Frances Benjamin Johnston, Gertrude Käsebier and Eva Watson-Schütze. The following year the same photographers were shown, along with prints by Robert Demachy, Zaida Ben-Yusuf, Frank Eugene and the then unknown Edward Steichen. In spite of Newark's small size and relative isolation from major cultural centers, the Newark Camera Club, led by White, quickly made the town "a force in the world of photography." By 1900 most of the major pictorial photographers in the U.S. had traveled to or were planning to travel to see White; according to one critic, he "brought the world to Newark".

=== 1899–1906: Advancing his art ===
By 1899 White was so well known that he had one-man shows at both the Camera Club of New York and at the Boston Camera Club, and he also exhibited in the London Photographic Salon organized by The Linked Ring. When the Newark Camera Club organized a major exhibit of pictorial photography, White exhibited 135 of his works. This show later was seen at the Cincinnati Art Museum. In addition to this series of exhibitions, one of White's simple family scenes, a portrait of his son Maynard, was reproduced in Stieglitz's new journal Camera Notes.

This same year White's father died at the relatively young age of 52. His death did not seem to affect his son's artistry or his interests; White continued exhibiting while traveling around the Midwest and East Coast to take portraits of friends and clients. On one of these trips he journeyed to Terre Haute, Indiana, where he was introduced to rising socialist leader Eugene Debs. White became close friends with Debs and other socialist leaders, including Clarence Darrow, Stephen Marion Reynolds and Horace Traubel, and for many years they exchanged correspondence and held long, philosophical discussions whenever they were in the same city together. White's belief in socialist values was one of the few pursuits other than photography for which he expressed any enthusiasm. After a prolonged visit with Reynolds, White wrote "I've never spent a week so full of inspiration since I've used a camera." His family, "brass-bound Republicans", hoped this interest was a temporary aberration, but White continued to express his affinity for these beliefs throughout his life.

In 1900 White was elected to membership in The Linked Ring, and he was both a juror and exhibitor at the Chicago Photographic Salon and the Third Philadelphia Photographic Salon. Eager for his discovery Edward Steichen to meet Stieglitz, he provided Steichen with a letter of introduction and insisted that Stieglitz see him soon. Steichen stopped over in New York on his way to Paris, and he and Stieglitz became long-time friends and colleagues. During this same period F. Holland Day, over Stieglitz's objections, organized a major exhibition in London called "The New School of American Photography." More than two dozen of White's photos were included in the show, which was later seen in Paris and in Germany. In his writings, Day said "Mr. White [is] the only man of real genius known to me who has chosen the camera as his medium of expression."

About this same time White wrote to Stieglitz "I have made up my mind that art in photography will be my life work and am prepared to live a very simple life with my little family to carry this out." His words were very prophetic since he struggled financially all of his life; he was known as a poor businessman and a great photographer.

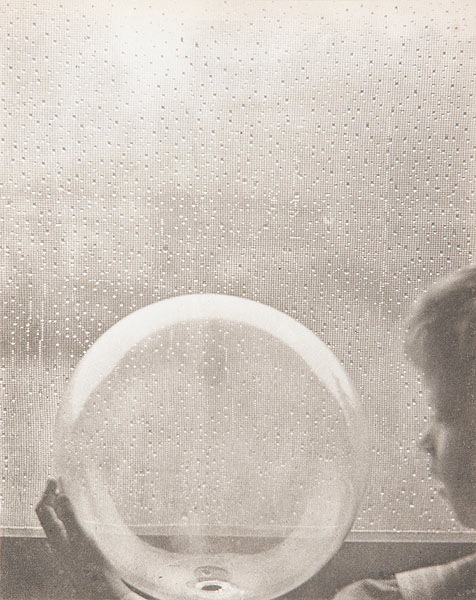
"Drops of Rain", 1903

A little more than a year later, Stieglitz, sensing a growing number of photographers who held his same beliefs about the artistry of the medium, founded the Photo-Secession, the first organization in America to promote pictorialism and fine art photography. He invited White and 10 others to become "charter members", although Stieglitz himself strictly controlled what the group did. Immediately Stieglitz began planning how to best advance the work of his new organization, and within a short while he organized an exhibition of the groups' photographs, including several by White, at the National Arts Club. Soon thereafter Stieglitz created another new magazine he called Camera Work to further display the work of the Photo-Secessionists. White had five of his photographs reproduced in the July 1903 issue and five more in January 1905. To be included in Camera Work and to be a member of the Photo-Secession meant that White was one of the inner circle of Stieglitz's friends at a time when Stieglitz was considered to be one of the top promoters of art photography in the world.

At that time the use of photographs to illustrate literature was a new and untested concept, but beginning in 1901 White undertook three different projects to illustrate literary works. He first provided prints for Irving Bacheller's book Eben Holden, which became a national best seller. White then illustrated his uncle Ira Billman's second book of poetry, Songs for All Seasons, and a magazine article called 'Beneath the Wrinkle" for McClure's, both in 1904.

Up until then White had been involved in all of his photography activities while still working his day job at Fleek and Neal in Newark. With all of his recent acclaim he finally decided he might be able to make a living as a photographer, and with little notice he quit his job and launched into being a professional photographer. He wrote to his friend F. Holland Day "It came about this way ‒ quit at 5 p.m. and at 7:30 p.m. I was ready to start to Chicago where I'd been called by Mr. Darrow in regards [to] illustrating a book of his…I expect to do the things I've had in mind for some time, and the few things that come my way ‒ and trust to the tender mercies."

Soon thereafter White won a Gold Medal at the First International Salon of Art Photography in The Hague and had several of his photograph shown in the inaugural exhibition by members of the Photo-Session at Stieglitz's new Little Galleries of the Photo-Secession.

While White's life was almost always hectic during this period, he and his wife were able to take a brief respite each summer in Maine. F. Holland Day invited them to spend a few weeks each year with him at his cabin at Little Good Harbor on Georgetown Island, Maine. They had made this outing an annual event since 1905, and the retreat from the summer heat and his business worries allowed White to concentrate solely on his work while there. Both "The Pipes of Pan" (1905) and "The Watcher" (1906) were made during his time in Maine.

=== 1906–1913: New York and professionalism ===
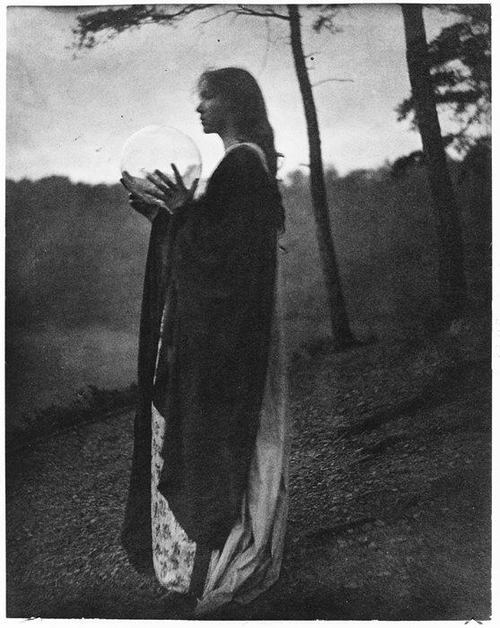
"The Bubble", 1898

Sometime in early 1906 White decided to leave Newark and move to New York City. Both his wife and he had become close friends with the East Coast photographers with whom he had been showing his work, including Stieglitz, Day, Käsebier, Steichen and Eugene. These extended family and artistic connections had supplanted the small group of like-minded friends the Whites had in Newark. At the center of these connections was Stieglitz, who had recently created "the heady siren of the Photo-Secession and the Little Galleries."

As they were getting ready to move Mrs. White learned she was pregnant, and as the early months were difficult for her it was decided that she would remain in Newark until after the baby was born. In September White moved to New York with his two sons and his widowed mother, who cared for the boys until their mother arrived. Their third son, Clarence Hudson White, Jr., was born in January 1907. Due to the difficulty of the pregnancy Mrs. White remained in Newark until June of that year.

The year 1907 was one of the most important in White's career. Arthur Wesley Dow, a painter, photographer and teacher, then chaired the art department at Columbia University. Dow, who had known White for at least five years, asked White to become a part-time lecturer in art photography at Teachers College, which was part of Columbia. This was a strong testimony to the international recognition of White's artistry, since White himself had no education beyond high school and he had never had any training in art of any kind. He soon found himself in love with his new profession, which finally afforded him a modest but steady income while relieving him of any detail of managing a business (White was notoriously lax in billing and collecting from clients).

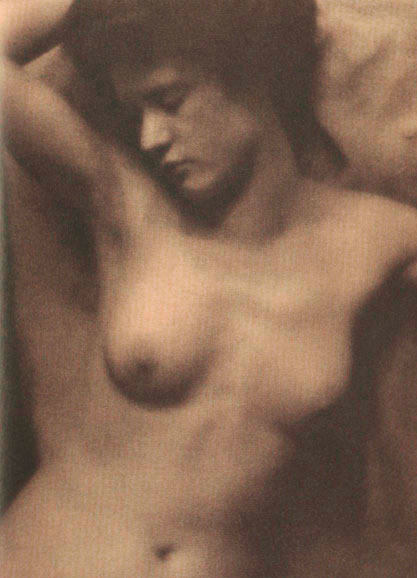
"Torso", 1907, jointly created by White and Stieglitz

During this same year White and Stieglitz undertook an artistic experiment in which they jointly created a series of photographs of two models, Mabel Cramer and another known only as Miss Thompson. Stieglitz offered suggestions about posing the models, White focused the camera, and one or the other of them would snap the shutter. White also developed the negatives and printed the photographs. One of the intentions of the experiment was to try a variety of printing techniques and papers, including platinum, gelatin silver and gum bichromate prints. They signed some of the prints with a monogram that combined both of their initials. During this collaboration, White learned the Autochrome color process from Stieglitz, who had just returned from Europe with this technical knowledge. White and Stieglitz jointly created at least one Autochrome during this time, which they exhibited later in the year.

In 1908 Stieglitz continued to show his admiration for White by devoting an entire issue of Camera Work to him and 16 of his photographs. It was only the third time Stieglitz had singled out an individual photographer for this honor (the others were Steichen and Coburn).

White was so well received as a teacher at Columbia that in 1908 he was appointed as an instructor at what was then called the Brooklyn Institute of Arts and Science (now known as the Brooklyn Museum). He maintained this position for the next 13 years, even while working at his own school and teaching independent workshops.

While visiting Day in Maine in 1910 White found a small, run-down cabin near Day's property, and he bought it. He then purchased a piece of property nearby and had the cabin moved to his new land. After the cabin was rebuilt and enlarged, White established the Seguinland School of Photography on the site. Named after a nearby hotel, Seguinland was the first independent school of photography in America. White asked his friend Max Weber to teach with him, and his colleagues Day and later Käsebier critiqued student work at the end of each summer session. Attracted by White's reputation and by the modest tuition costs, the first students to the school came from New York, Philadelphia, Baltimore, Chicago, Los Angeles, Ecuador and Egypt. One-, two-, and four-week sessions were priced at $20, $30 and $50 respectively. In keeping with White's nature, the students at Seguinland enjoyed an informal, family-like atmosphere in which White and his wife took his classes on picnics and outings along the seashore. Seguinland lasted until 1915, when the responsibilities of running White's newly established school in New York overwhelmed his financial ability to keep the Maine school going.

Also in 1910, Stieglitz led an effort to create a major exhibition of the Photo-Secession artists at what was then called the Albright Gallery in Buffalo, New York (now known as the Albright-Knox Art Gallery). While this effort was announced as a group activity of the Photo-Secession, Stieglitz refused to allow any others to have input or make decision about who would be included in the exhibition and how it would be displayed. Stieglitz, who was already known for his domineering ways and dogmatic approach to photography, took his self-assigned, unilateral authority even beyond his past actions; in this case he proved to have gone too far for several people who had been closely aligned with him. First Käsebier, then White and finally Steichen broke off their relationship with Stieglitz, each citing Stieglitz's overbearing ego, his refusal to consider other's viewpoints and his repeated actions on behalf of the Photo-Secession without consulting any of the so-called "members" of the group.

Stieglitz reacted to these claims and White's departure in particular with his usual antagonistic manner. Within a short while, he delivered to White most of the negatives and prints he had jointly produced with White in 1907. The split between the two was so deep that Stieglitz wrote to White "One thing I do demand…is that my name not be mentioned by you in connection with either the prints or the negatives… Unfortunately I cannot wipe out the past…."

=== 1914–1920: Teacher and leader ===
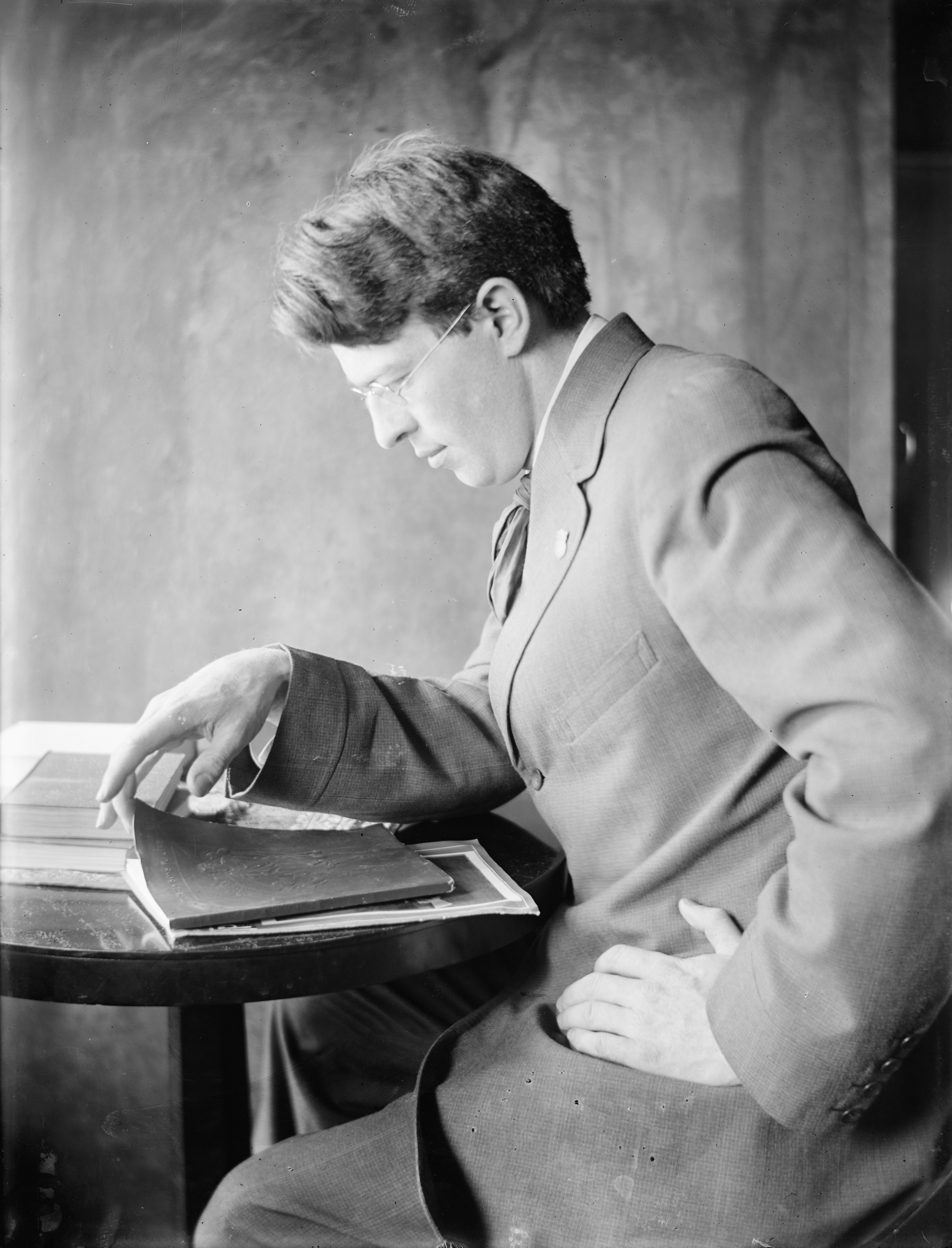
White circa 1910. Portrait by Gertrude Käsebier.

==== Clarence H. White School of Modern Photography ====
Encouraged by the success of the Seguinland School and by his newfound freedom to act outside of the shadow of Stieglitz, White founded the Clarence H. White School of Photography in 1914. White asked Max Weber to join him, along with Paul Lewis Anderson. White taught the students about photographic style and interpretation; Weber taught design, composition and art theory; and Anderson taught the technical aspects of cameras and equipment. Jane White took on the roles of administrator, bookkeeper, social director and facilitator for her husband's daily tasks.

Over the next decade, the School attracted many students who went on to become notable photographers, including Ruth Matilda Anderson, Margaret Bourke-White, Anton Bruehl, Dorothea Lange, Paul Outerbridge, Laura Gilpin, Ralph Steiner, Karl Struss, Margaret Watkins and Doris Ulmann.

One of the reasons for its success was White's approach to teaching. He emphasized personal vision and style over any particular school or movement. Students were assigned "problems" and asked to create images that evoked particular concepts or sentiments, such as "Innocence" or "Thanksgiving". He also required students to experiment, much like he and Stieglitz did, by producing several kinds of prints of the same image. Of the 30 hours of instruction offered each week at the school, 14 were taken up by a single class – "The Art of Photography", taught by White. During these sessions White stressed that the primary thing his students had to learn was "the capacity to see." He never encouraged or permitted competition among his students by comparing the work of one against another; each person's work was approached totally in relation to that person.

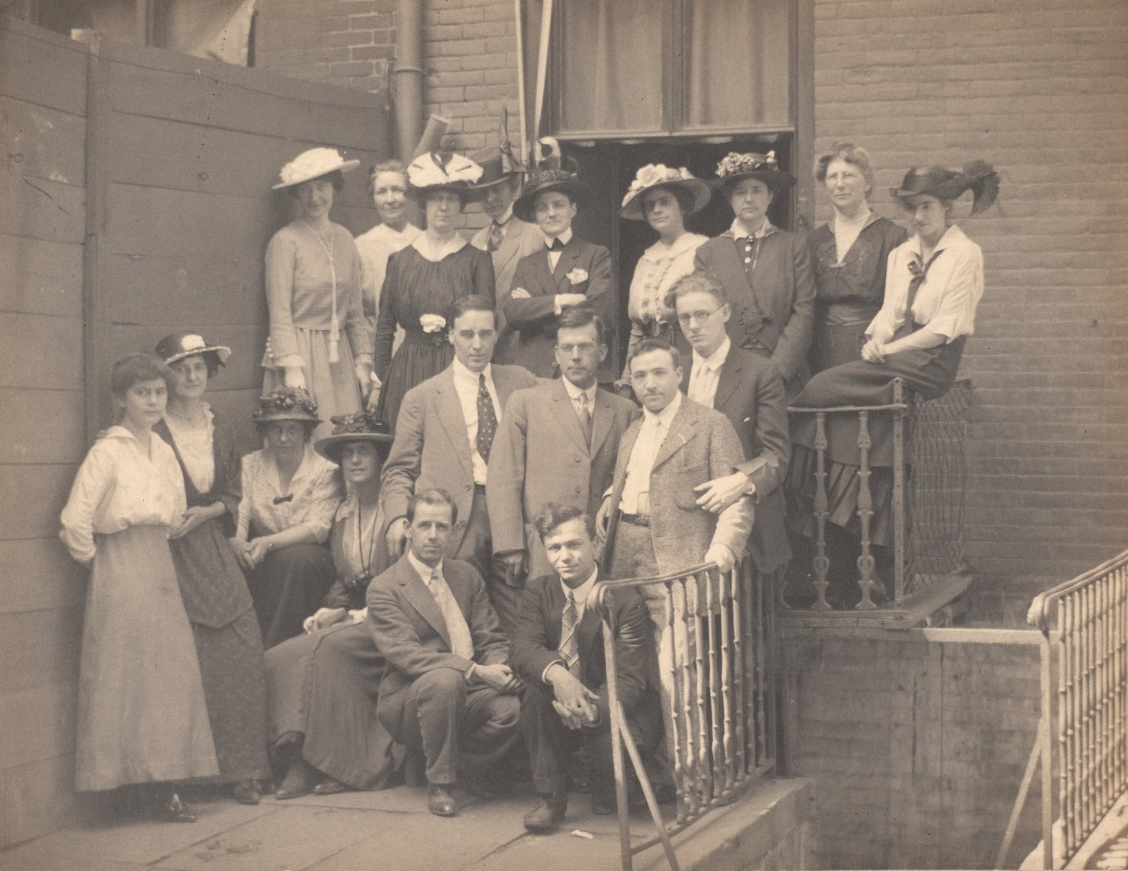
Faculty and students of the School, circa 1915

This concept applied regardless of the student's ultimate interest; White understood that not everyone was an artist. The School treated "photography not only as a fine art with established technique but also as a practical art, indispensable to modern commerce and industry." Some of its students went on to work in journalism, advertising, industry, medicine and scientific professions.

White was best known at the School for his weekly commentaries on students' work, described as "sympathetic yet searching criticisms that faithfully showed them how weak they were yet always somehow made them courageous and strong." His student Marie Riggin Higbee Avery summarized what happened there by saying "The rigor of our training, together with the indominable [sic] spirit fostered in each of us, a result of Clarence White's teaching, was to carry a few of the least promising of the group to places of high honor in the photograph world."

Equally important to the teachings were the extracurricular activities that White developed to supplement the classwork. Later on, a Friday evening guest lecturer series included Stieglitz, Steichen, Paul Strand and Francis Bruguière. He also had school alumni Paul Outerbridge, Doris Ulmann and Anton Bruehl speak as part of the same series.

One of the distinguishing characteristics of White as a teacher was his encouragement of women as photographers. White sought out and personally coached many aspiring female photographers, who found his openness to a variety of styles and techniques exactly what they were looking for at a time when most men had highly autocratic views. Ralph Steiner recalled that "he didn't press hard for absolute perfection, but always found something to praise, [which] won him the worship of a lot of ladies." By 1915 there were roughly twice as many women as men at the school. This ratio did not change until the 1930s.

White's encouragement of women was in complete contrast to Stieglitz, whose "paternalistic and sexist attitudes" kept him from seriously considering many outstanding women photographers of his time. After White's death, Stieglitz summed up his attitudes in a letter to Kuehn, saying "His [White's] pupils ‒ women ‒ half-baked dilettantes ‒ not a single real talent…."

After several years, former students made up a majority of the White School instructors. In 1918 Charles J. Martin, a former student of White's at Columbia, took over as instructor at the School when Weber left. Margaret Watkins, an early student, became known for her tough critiques of the technical aspects of photographs when she taught from 1919 to 1925. Other students-turned-teachers included Margaret Bourke-White, Bernard Horne, Arthur Chapman, Anton Bruehl, Robert Waida and Alfred Cohn.

From 1921–25 the School offered summer sessions in both New York and in Canaan, Connecticut. The summer sessions returned briefly from 1931–33 in Woodstock, New York, but after that all classes were held in New York.

==== Pictorial Photographers of America ====
In early 1916 White, along with colleagues Gertrude Käsebier, Karl Struss and Edward Dickinson, founded the Pictorial Photographers of America (PPA), a national organization dedicated to promoting pictorial photography. Like the Photo-Secession, the PPA sponsored exhibitions and published a journal. But unlike the Photo-Secession, the PPA consciously refrained from exclusivity and advocated using pictorial photography as a medium for art education. During the 1920s the PPA began embracing other style of photography and was instrumental in bringing "a pluralism to pictorialism".

As he did with his School, White made sure that the PPA welcomed women and that they were included in its governance. Käsebier was the organization's first honorary vice-president, and women were on its executive committee, nomination committee and the Council of Forty, which included representatives from around the country. According to the PPA's first annual report in 1917, women represented 45 percent of the organization's membership.

White served as the association's first president, serving from 1917 to 1921. He stepped down from the presidency because he believed that the organization would benefit by a change. For the next few years the annual meeting of PPA was held with the White School summer sessions in Connecticut.

In 1921 the PPA joined with the Art Alliance of America, the Art Directors Club, the American Institute of Graphic Arts, the New York Society of Craftsmen and the Society of Illustrators to open a building known as the Arts Center. The purpose of the new building was to allow the different organizations to regularly interact with each other and to provide a place where "the public standard of utilitarian art was raised." White believed that future of photography was tied closely to the then rapidly growing field of magazine illustration, and it was not long before lectures were presented at the Arts Center with titles such as "Pictorial Principles Applied to Architectural Photography" and "What the Photographic Magazine can Do for the Pictorial Photographer."

=== Later life: 1920–1925 ===
World War I was very difficult for White because of his Socialist values. War of any kind was abhorrent to his beliefs, and he struggled during this period about how to respond when so much of the country was engaged in supporting the war. His family life faced a crisis when his sons Maynard and Lewis enlisted in the Army. Lewis was quickly discharged due to a heart defect, but Maynard remained in the service until the end of the war. In addition, his colleague Karl Struss had been sent to a detention camp because of his German heritage.

White devoted himself more than ever to his teaching in order to take his mind off of these problems. He rarely photographed during this period, and many of his colleagues were similarly affected. Perhaps because they longed for something to remind them of how things were before the war, White and Stieglitz gradually reconciled many of their differences. This was the only half-way bright spot in an otherwise difficult period. In 1923 White wrote to Stieglitz, saying "I understand that [George] Seeley is doing nothing; Coburn likewise; Day sick in bed. I do not know whether I can again do anything, but I hope someday to try."

To help boost his spirits and to look for new inspirations, White decided to go to Mexico in the summer of 1925. It was going to be both a teaching experience, as several students went with him, and a chance for him to begin photographing again. He arrived in Mexico in early July, and, as a sign of White's reputation and influence, he was immediately visited by Mexican President Plutarco Elías Calles.

Tragedy struck on July 7 when White suddenly suffered a heart attack after taking some of his first photographs in years; he died 24 hours later. White was 54 years old. His son Maynard arrived after his death and claimed the body, which was taken back to Newark for a funeral and burial. His family and friends from the town were the only ones who were able to attend the services.

== Post-death ==
Although White and Stieglitz had tried to reconcile their differences before White died, Stieglitz never forgave White for breaking from him in 1912. Upon hearing about White's untimely death, Stieglitz wrote to Kuehn, "Poor White. Cares and vexation. When I last saw him he told me he was not able to cope with [life as well as he was] twenty years ago. I reminded him that I warned him to stay in business in Ohio ‒ New York would be too much for him. But the Photo-Session beckoned. Vanity and ambitions. His photography went to the devil." In spite of these words, Stieglitz had 49 of White's photographs, including 18 created jointly with Stieglitz, in his personal collection when he died.

The White School continued to operate under the direction of Jane White until 1940, when she no longer had the energy to keep up with the long hours and many students. Her son Clarence H. White Jr. took over for her, and for a short while he was able to increase enrollment. However, a poorly timed move to larger quarters to accommodate the new students coincided with the mobilization for World War II, and the School's enrollment soon plummeted. It finally closed in 1942.

In 1949 White Jr. was offered the chance to set up a photography department at Ohio University, and he continued in his father's footsteps by establishing a school there that was "second to none". White Jr. died in 1978 at the age of 71.

In 1986 White was inducted into the International Photography Hall of Fame and Museum.

== Style and technique ==
From the beginning White's vision was heavily influenced by the culture and social ways of a small town in Ohio. He "celebrated elemental things, the time spent playing in the fields or woods, the simple pleasure of unhurried living, the playing of games in interior spaces…. White, growing up within an extended family, knowing nothing else, had no real sense of other societies and his pictures thus had a kind of fortification against the outside. They were his private epic."

Of necessity, White depicted this cultural milieu with an extraordinary rendering of light. Due to very long hours at his accounting job, often going from 7 am to 6 pm six days a week, White most often photographed his subjects just after dawn and just before dusk. Once he wrote "My photographs were less sharp than others and I do not think it was because of the lens so much as the conditions under which the photographs were made ‒ never in the studio, always in the home or in the open, and when out of doors at a time of day very rarely selected for photography." He also shared an intimate familiarity with his subjects, who most often were his wife, her three sisters and his own children.

Nonetheless, White's photographs were not casually posed; he carefully controlled every detail in his scenes, sometimes even having special costumes created for his models. He saw in his mind exactly what he wanted and then made it happen through his camera. It's been said that "White is most significant in the history of photography because, in his early years, he redefined the nature of picture-making, creating a distinctly modern idiom for his own time…. He reduced his compositions to very simple elements of form, and by experimenting with principles of design derived largely from Whistler and Japanese prints, he created a person style that was unique for photography.

Peter Bunnell further wrote "The qualities that make White's photographs memorable have to do with both form and content. In his finest pictures the disposition of every element, of each line and shape, is elevated to an expressive intensity few photographers managed to attain ... White was able to transform the sensory perception of light into an exposition of the most fundamental aspect of photography – the literal materialization of form through light itself. His prints, mostly in the platinum medium, display a richness, a subtlety, and a luminosity of tone rarely achieved in the history of photography."

While White mostly is known for his family scenes and portraits, his "…work is not genre because it really tells us very little about the individuals shown or the world they live in. White subject's are apparently just there, and that's about the end of it. What we seem to have here is a 'pure photography', similar perhaps to the earlier 'pure painting' of the nineteenth century."

In terms of White's style it is important note that while he spent almost all of his life from 1906 to 1925 living in New York City, there is nothing in his photographs to indicate he ever lived there. There were no streets scenes or people in the city, no buildings, bridges, ships or automobiles. Unlike most of his photographer friends, he chose to ignore the very place he lived except for the access it gave him to promote his work and to teach others. Although he was pragmatic in his need to earn a living and advance his art, he remained true to his small town roots throughout his life.

Throughout most of his life White was limited financially in what camera and lenses he used. He once declared "The most important factor in the selection [of his equipment] being a $50.00 limit." For most of his time in Newark he used a 6 1/2" x 8 1/2" view camera with a 13" Hobson portrait lens.

White is known to have worked in the following processes: platinum, gum-platinum, palladium, gum-palladium, gum, glycerin developed platinum, cyanotype and hand-coated platinum. His platinum prints utilized salts of platinum instead of the silver salts used in modern platinum prints, resulting in a greater range and richness of middle tones.

White sometimes printed the same image using different processes, and as a result there are significant variations in how some of his prints appear. His platinum prints have a deep magenta-brown tone, for example, whereas his gum prints have a distinct reddish hue. Photogravures of his images in Camera Work, which he considered to be true prints, were more neutral, tending toward warm black-and-white tones.

Before 1902 White dated his photographs according to when the negative was made, even though he might not have printed it that same year. For his later prints he often assigned two dates, one when the image was taken and another when it was printed.

== Quotes about White ==
- "I think that if I were asked to name the most subtle and refined master photography has produced, that I would name him... To be a true artist in photography one must also be an artist in life, and Clarence H. White was such an artist." Alvin Langdon Coburn
- "What he brought to photography was an extraordinary sense of light. The Orchard is bathed in light. The Edge of the Woods is a tour de force of the absence of light." Beaumont Newhall
- "Clarence White's poetic vision and sensitive intuition produced images that insinuate themselves deeply into one's consciousness." Edward Steichen
- "Anyone who came under his influence never got over it." Stella Simon, a White School alumnus and prominent photographer
- "To Clarence H. White, one of the very few who understand what the Photo-Secession means & is." Inscription in a collection of Photo-Secession memorabilia presented to White by Alfred Stieglitz
- "The man was a good teacher, a great teacher, and I can still occasionally think "I wish he were around. I'd like to show him this.' Isn't that odd, that that stays with you?" Dorothea Lange

== Gallery ==
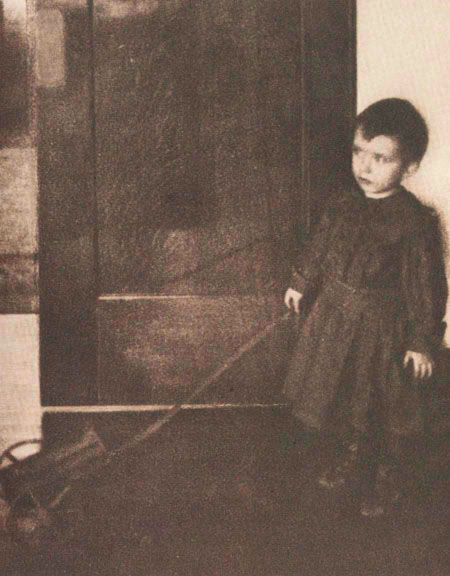
Boy with Wagon, 1898

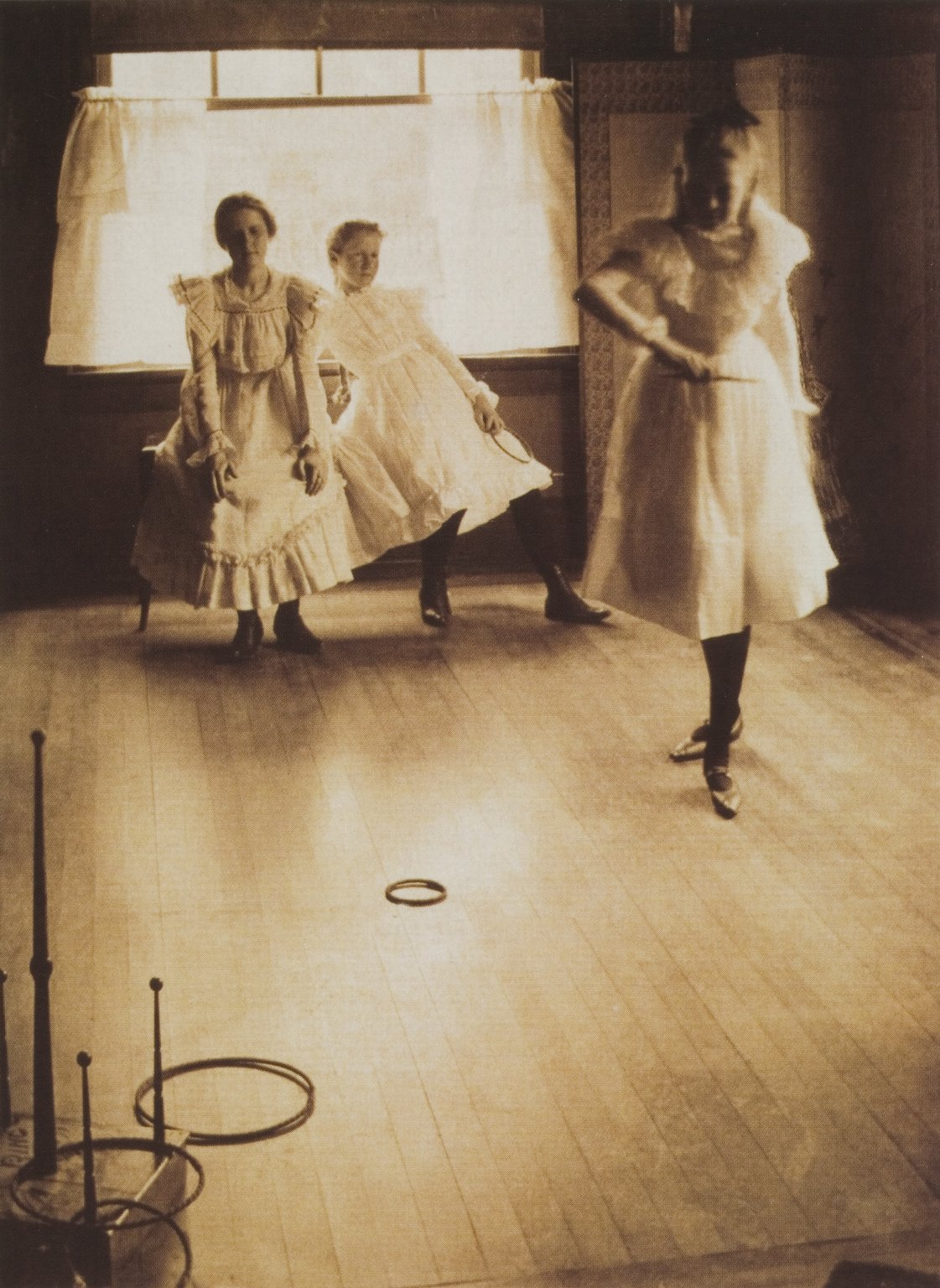
The Ring Toss, 1899

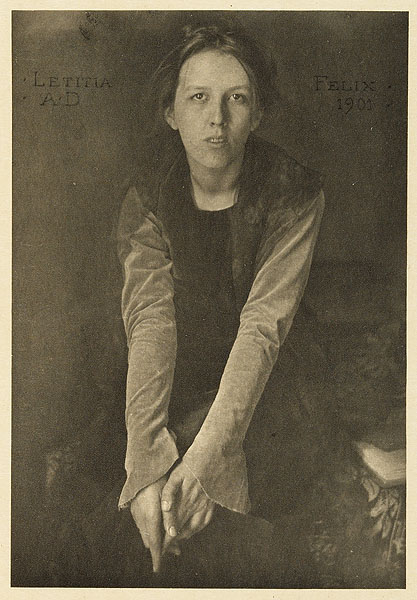
Letitia Felix, 1901

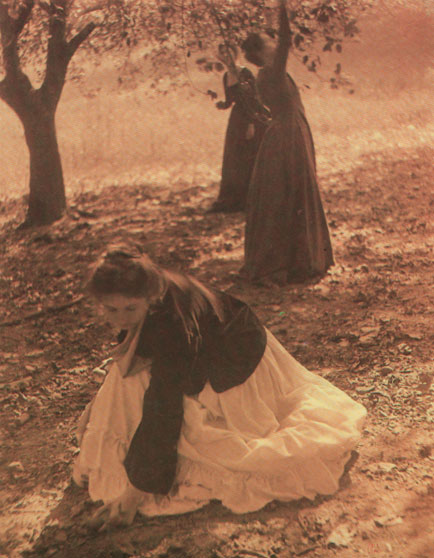
The Orchard, 1902

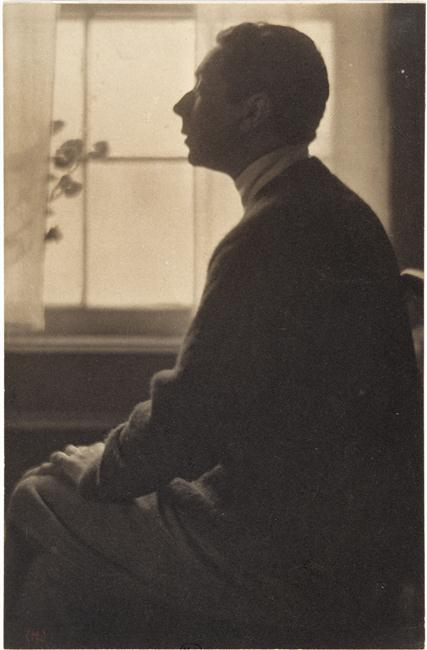
Adolf de Meyer, ca. 1904

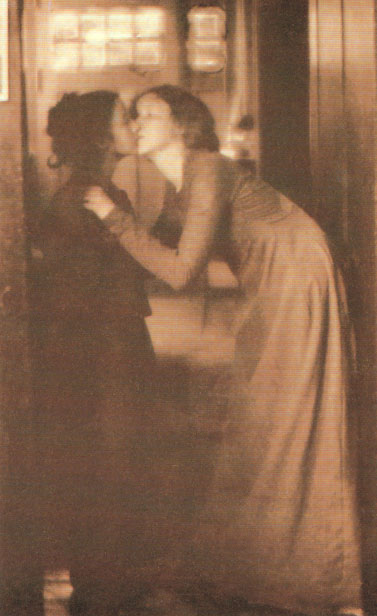
The Kiss, 1905

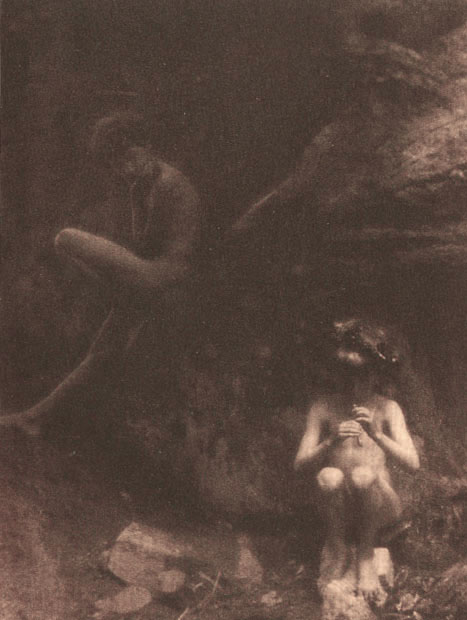
Pipes of Pans, 1905

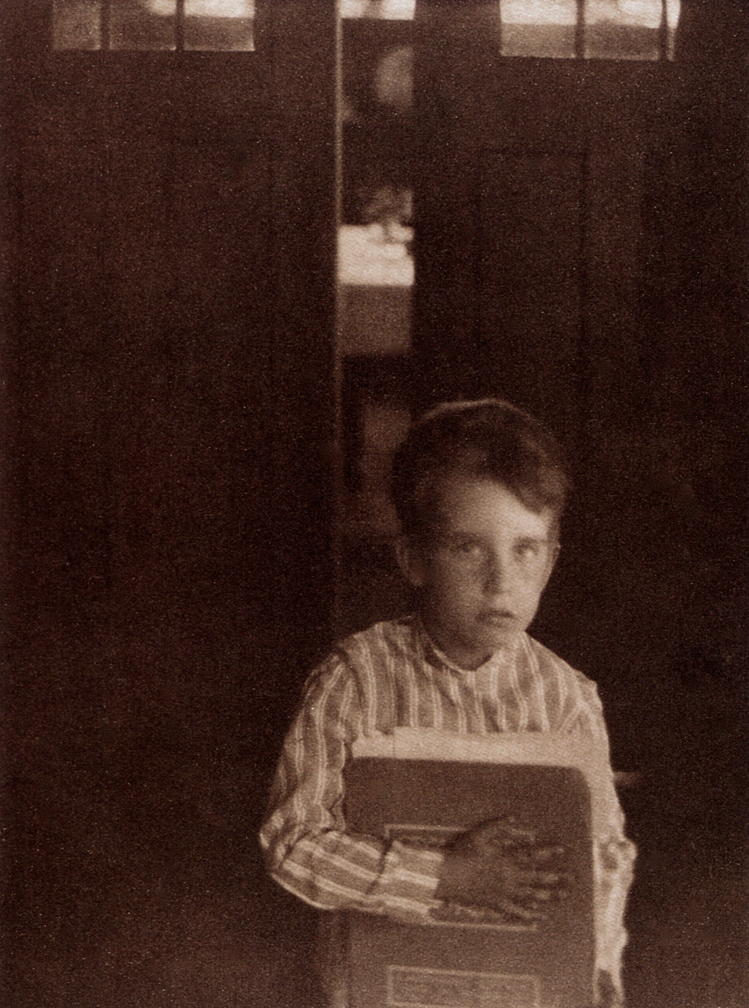
Boy with Camera Work, 1905

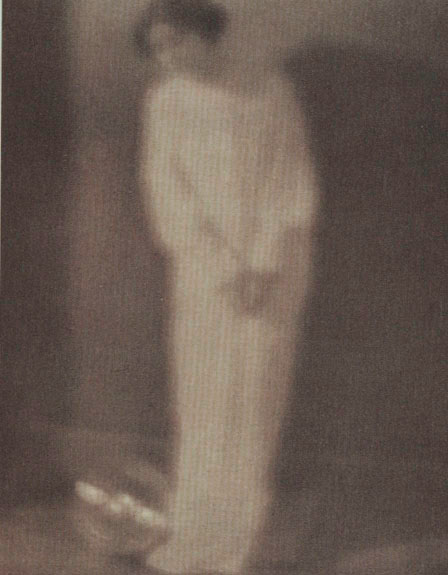
Experiment #27 – Jointly created by White and Alfred Stieglitz

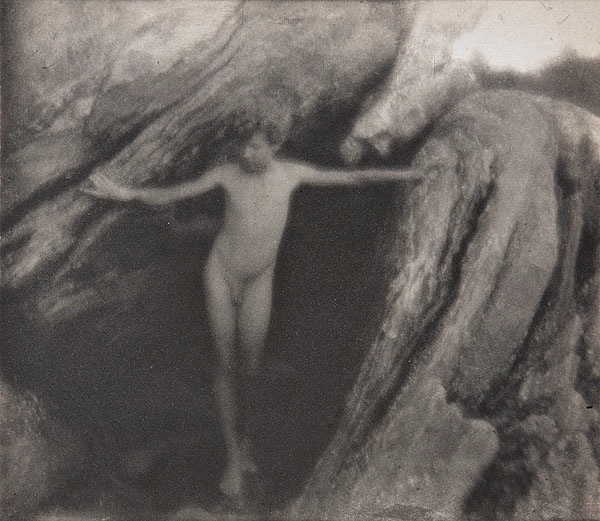
Nude, 1908

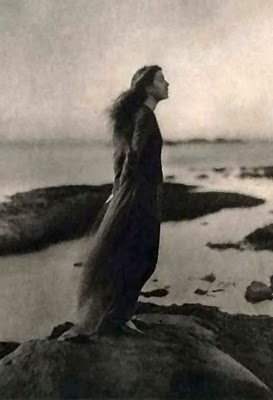
The Sea (Rose Pastor Stokes, Caritas Island, Connecticut), 1909
