= Charles McGraw =

American actor (1914–1980)

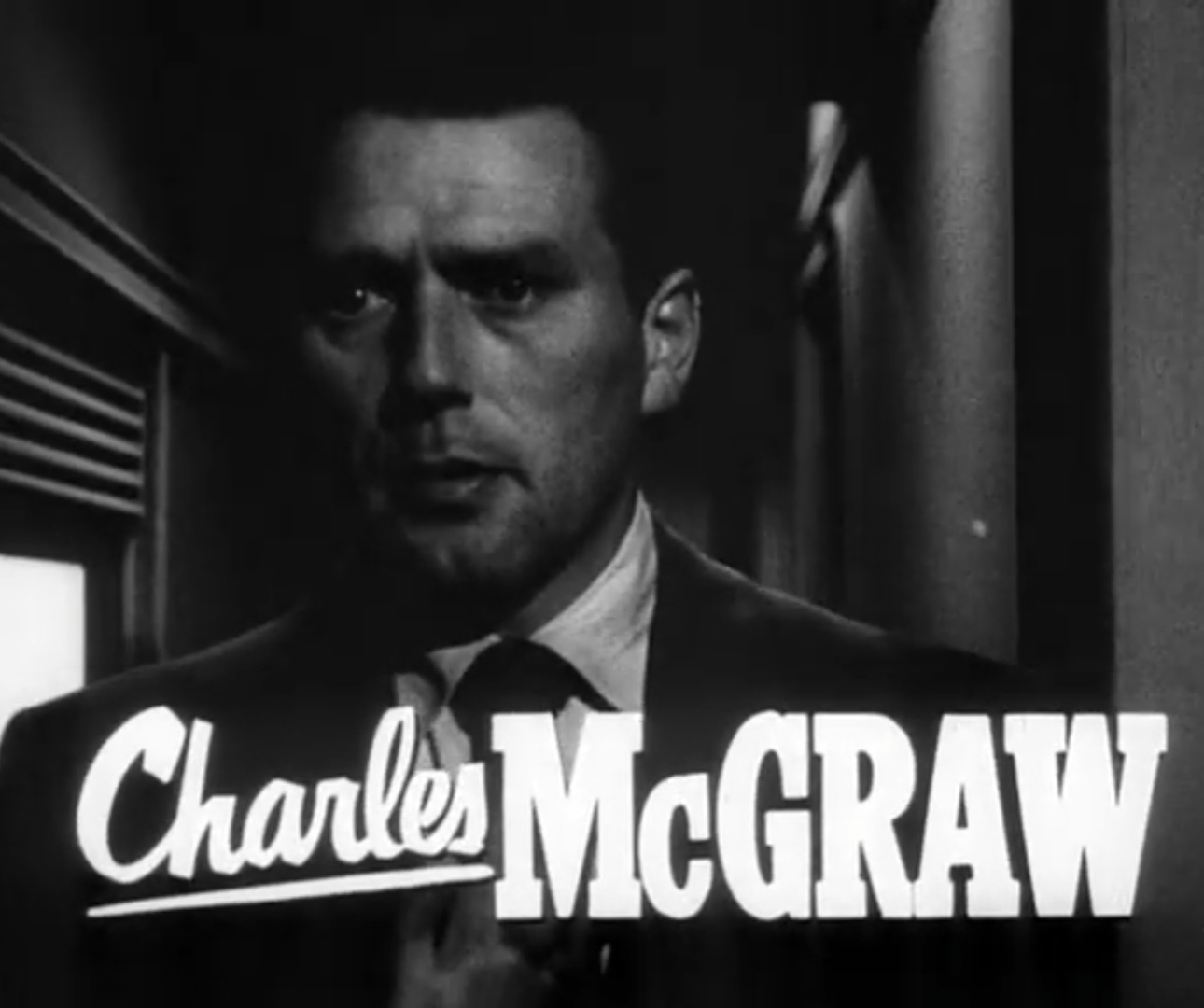
- Trailer for The Narrow Margin (1952)
- Born: Charles Crisp Butters; May 10, 1914; Des Moines, Iowa, U.S.
- Died: July 29, 1980 (aged 66); Los Angeles, California, U.S.
- Occupation: Actor
- Years active: 1942–1977
- Spouse: Freda Choy Kitt (m. 1938; div. 1968)
- Children: 1

Charles McGraw (born Charles Crisp Butters; May 10, 1914 – July 29, 1980) was an American stage, film and television actor whose career spanned more than three decades.

== Early life ==
McGraw was born to Beatrice (née Crisp) and Francis P. Butters in Des Moines, Iowa. Federal census records indicate that he later moved with his parents to Akron, Ohio, where his father worked as a salesman and service manager. In January 1932, McGraw graduated from high school in Akron and then attended one semester of college.

His early jobs included working on a freighter and dancing in night clubs.

== Career ==
=== Stage ===
Before getting into film, McGraw was active in theatrical road companies. He also appeared in "dozens of off-Broadway productions."

Charles McGraw enlisted in the United States Army in January 1944 to serve during World War II, putting his burgeoning Hollywood career on hold. He ultimately served and was discharged later that same year in December 1944.

=== Film ===
McGraw made his first film in 1942 with a small, uncredited role in The Undying Monster at Fox. He was in Tonight We Raid Calais (1942) and They Came to Blow Up America (1943) at the same studio, and also Two Tickets to London (1943), Destroyer (1943), Corvette K-225 (1943), The Mad Ghoul (1943), The Impostor (1944), and The Seventh Cross (1944).

He frequently appeared as a lead actor in the film noir genre during the late 1940s and early 1950s. He was particularly known for his vocal characteristics and physical appearance in the genre.

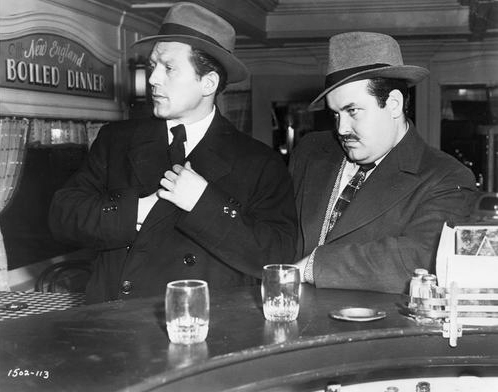
McGraw (left) and William Conrad play the titular roles in The Killers (1946)

His first notable role was in The Killers (1946), which opens with McGraw and fellow heavy William Conrad as the two hitmen who terrorize a small-town diner in their search for double-crossing hoodlum Burt Lancaster.

McGraw was unbilled in The Farmer's Daughter (1947) and Brute Force (1947) and had small roles in The Big Fix (1947) and The Long Night (1947). He had slightly bigger parts in On the Old Spanish Trail (1947), a Roy Rogers Western, and some noirs, Roses Are Red (1947) and The Gangster (1947).

McGraw's parts remained small in T-Men (1947) for Anthony Mann, The Hunted (1948), Berlin Express (1948), Hazard (1948), and Blood on the Moon (1948). He had a bigger role in Once More, My Darling (1949), then went back to small parts in Reign of Terror (1949) and Border Incident (1949) for Mann, and The Story of Molly X (1949).

McGraw moved up to third billing in the noir The Threat (1949). He played a cop in Side Street (1950) for Mann and a gangster in Ma and Pa Kettle Go to Town (1951). He played Perry Smith's (Robert Blake) father in "In Cold Blood" (1967).

=== Leading man ===
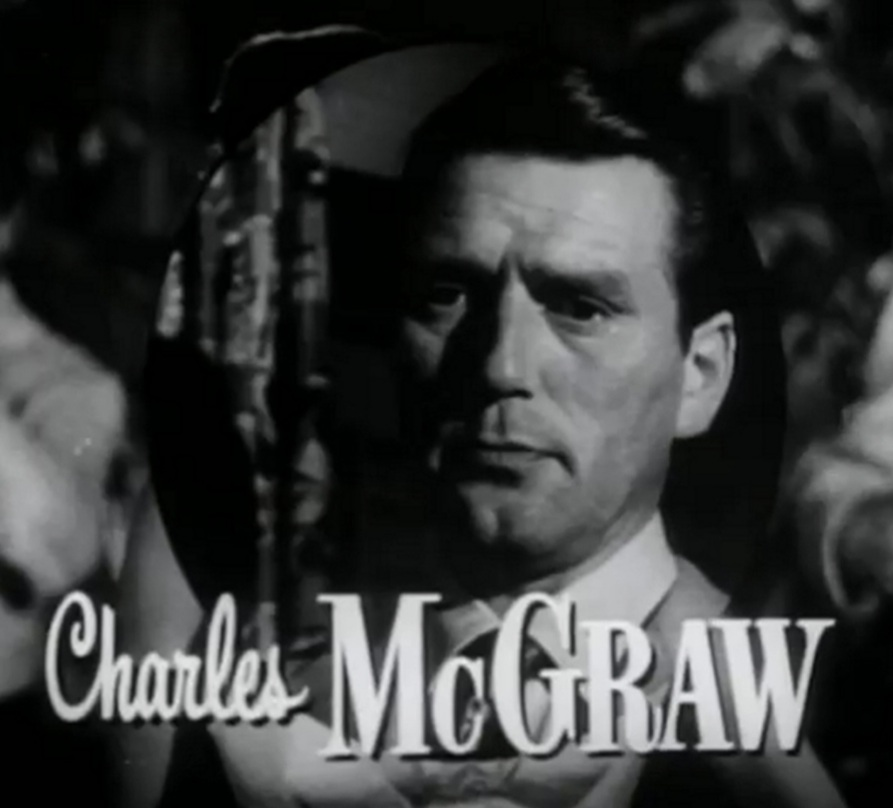
Trailer for His Kind of Woman (1951)

McGraw was finally given a leading role in RKO's Armored Car Robbery (1950) directed by Richard Fleischer. He played a gangster in His Kind of Woman (1951), then had the lead in Roadblock (1951) as "Honest Joe," the insurance investigator turned thief by love.

Fleischer used McGraw in the lead of The Narrow Margin (1952). He was a sergeant in One Minute to Zero (1952) and War Paint (1953) and was a villain in Thunder Over the Plains (1954).

McGraw's other notable roles were as Kirk Douglas's gladiator trainer in the epic Spartacus (1960) and as "The Preacher" in the science fiction film A Boy and His Dog. During the filming of Spartacus, Kirk Douglas accidentally broke McGraw's jaw during an action sequence.

=== Television ===
After appearing in radio, including the 03/13/1949 episode "Rubin Callaway's Pictures" of the noir-ish detective radio program Pat Novak for Hire, McGraw moved to television. In the 1954-55 television season, McGraw starred as the character Mike Waring in the 39-episode syndicated series Adventures of the Falcon. The series updated the original Falcon premise to portray Waring as a secret agent in the Cold War. He also starred in the first television version of Casablanca (1955), taking Humphrey Bogart's role as Rick Blaine. Additionally, he had the role of Captain Hughes in The Smith Family.

In 1963, McGraw played Dr. Simon Oliver in the pilot of Diagnosis: Danger, a medical drama. He later had various single-appearance roles in television episodes such as the gruff and menacing Sheriff Gains in "The Gamble," an installment of the NBC western series Bonanza. In 1964, he guest starred on Gunsmoke as Albert Calvin, rich farm owner who lets jealousy ruin his life and drive him to murder in "Bently" (S9E28).

In 1960, McGraw played United States Army scout Tom Barrows in the episode "The Scout" on the ABC/Desilu Western television series The Life and Legend of Wyatt Earp starring Hugh O'Brian. Though he has an Apache wife, Barrows is known for his attacks on Apache warriors. He is called "The Listener" because he cuts off and wears the ears of the Indians he has killed. The Indians retaliate by killing Barrows's wife. He portrayed the bloodthirsty Civil War veteran Sgt. Wesley Kiles in "The Lt. Burton Story" (S5E22 Wagon Train 2/27/1962), whose plan to undermine young Lt. Burton (Dean Jones) is foiled. McGraw also appeared in an episode of The Untouchables titled "The Jake Lingle Killing"(S1E3 10/29/1959). McGraw portrayed the trigger-happy Rear Admiral Tobin in (S1E6 10/16/1964) of Voyage to the Bottom of the Sea titled "The Sky is Falling."

Late in his career, McGraw performed too as a voice actor, providing voice-over narrations for several productions. He portrayed a boat captain in "Harbor Division," a 1973 episode of Adam-12. He also appeared in 1973 in Hawkins: Death and the Maiden, a TV movie that served as the pilot for the series Hawkins starring James Stewart.

== Personal life and death ==
McGraw married Freda Choy Kitt in 1938, and had one daughter. They divorced in 1968.

On July 29, 1980, he died accidentally at his home in Studio City, California, slipping in the bathroom and falling through a glass shower door, causing several cuts, including a gash to his arm that severed the brachial artery. Paramedics arrived after he bled to death.

== Honors and awards ==
In recognition of his contributions to the entertainment industry as an actor, McGraw was awarded a star on the Hollywood Walk of Fame in Los Angeles, California on February 8, 1960. His star is located at 6927 Hollywood Boulevard.

== Filmography ==
- The Undying Monster (1942) as Strud Strudwick (uncredited)
- The Moon Is Down (1943) as Ole (uncredited)
- Tonight We Raid Calais (1943) as German Corporal (uncredited)
- They Came to Blow Up America (1943) as Zellerbach
- Two Tickets to London (1943) as Hendrik (uncredited)
- Mechanized Patrolling (1943) as Cpl. McGraw
- Destroyer (1943) as Assistant Chief Engineer (uncredited)
- Corvette K-225 (1943) as Chief Engineer (uncredited)
- The Mad Ghoul (1943) as Garrity
- The Impostor (1944) as Menessier
- The Seventh Cross (1944) as Allbright (uncredited)
- The Killers (1946) as Al
- The Farmer's Daughter (1947) as Fisher, Finley's Henchman (uncredited)
- The Big Fix (1947) as Armiston
- The Long Night (1947) as Policeman Stevens
- Brute Force (1947) as Andy (uncredited)
- On the Old Spanish Trail (1947) as Harry Blaisdell
- Roses Are Red (1947) as Duke Arno
- The Gangster (1947) as Dugas
- T-Men (1947) as Moxie
- The Hunted (1948) as Detective
- Berlin Express (1948) as USFET Colonel Johns (uncredited)
- Hazard (1948) as Chick
- Blood on the Moon (1948) as Milo Sweet
- Once More, My Darling (1949) as Herman Schmelz, Chauffeur
- Reign of Terror (1949) as Sergeant
- Border Incident (1949) as Jeff Amboy
- The Story of Molly X (1949) as Police Captain Breen
- The Threat (1949) as Arnold 'Red' Kluger
- Side Street (1949) as Detective Stan Simon
- Ma and Pa Kettle Go to Town (1950) as Shotgun Mike Munger
- Armored Car Robbery (1950) as Lieutenant Jim Cordell
- Double Crossbones (1951) as Captain Ben Wickett
- His Kind of Woman (1951) as Thompson / Narrator
- Roadblock (1951) as Joe Peters
- The Narrow Margin (1952) as Detective Sergeant Walter Brown
- One Minute to Zero (1952) as Sfc. Baker
- War Paint (1953) as Sergeant Clarke
- Thunder Over the Plains (1953) as Ben Westman
- Loophole (1954) as Gus Slavin
- The Bridges at Toko-Ri (1955) as Commander Wayne Lee
- Away All Boats (1956) as Lieutenant Mike O'Bannion
- Toward the Unknown (1956) as Colonel 'Mickey' McKee
- The Cruel Tower (1956) as Harry 'Stretch' Clay
- Joe Butterfly (1957) as Sgt. Jim McNulty
- Slaughter on Tenth Avenue (1957) as Lt. Anthony Vosnick
- Joe Dakota (1957) as Cal Moore
- Saddle the Wind (1958) as Larry Venables
- The Defiant Ones (1958) as Captain Frank Gibbons
- Twilight for the Gods (1958) as Yancy
- The Man in the Net (1959) as Sheriff Steve Ritter
- The Wonderful Country (1959) as Dr. Herbert J. Stovall
- Spartacus (1960) as Marcellus
- Cimarron (1960) as Bob Yountis
- The Horizontal Lieutenant (1962) as Colonel Charles Korotny
- The Alfred Hitchcock Hour (1963) (Season 1 Episode 22: "Diagnosis: Danger") as Dr. Simon P. Oliver
- The Birds (1963) as Sebastian Sholes, Fisherman in Diner
- It's a Mad, Mad, Mad, Mad World (1963) as Lt. Matthews
- Nightmare in Chicago (1964) as Harry Brockman
- In Cold Blood (1967) as Tex Smith
- The Busy Body (1967) as Fred Harwell
- Hang 'Em High (1968) as Sheriff Ray Calhoun
- Pendulum (1969) as Deputy Chief John P. Hildebrand
- Tell Them Willie Boy Is Here (1969) as Sheriff Frank Wilson
- Johnny Got His Gun (1971) as Mike Burkeman
- Chandler (1971) as Bernie Oakman
- The Night Stalker (1972) as Chief Masterson
- The Longest Night (1972) as Father Chase
- A Boy and His Dog (1975) as Preacher
- The Killer Inside Me (1976) as Howard Hendricks
- Twilight's Last Gleaming (1977) as Air Force General Peter Crane (final film role)
