= Ema Spencer =

American photographer, columnist (1857–1941)

- Born: March 1, 1857; Gratiot, Ohio, U.S.
- Died: September 30, 1941 (aged 84); Newark, Ohio, U.S.
- Known for: Photography
- Style: Pictorialism
- Movement: Photo-Secession

Ema Spencer (March 1, 1857 – September 30, 1941) was an American photographer, newspaper columnist, and teacher from Newark, Ohio. In 1898, alongside Clarence H. White, Spencer was one of the co-founders of the Newark Camera Club, an amateur photography club.

== Early life ==
Ema Spencer was born to Dr. Benjamin Franklin Spencer and his wife, Susan Porter Spencer, in the Licking County, Ohio village of Gratiot. She had a sister, Carolyn, and a brother, Charles Hildreth. She attended Newark High School where she graduated Valedictorian and she went on to study at the Young Ladies' Institute in nearby Granville.

== Photography career ==
In early 1898 Spencer and Clarence H. White co-founded the Newark Camera Club, a group of fifteen amateur photographers from the city. That fall she served as the Secretary for the newly established Ohio State Association of Amateur Photographers. Spencer's photography career continued until at least 1914 despite the Newark Camera Club's dissolution in 1906 when White left for New York.

Year	Exhibition	Location	Notes
1898	Newark Camera Club	161 North 4th St., Newark, Ohio, U.S.	Held at Ema Spencer's home
1899	Newark Camera Club	YMCA, Newark, Ohio, U.S.	
1899	Philadelphia Salon	Pennsylvania Academy of the Fine Arts, Philadelphia, Pennsylvania, U.S.	
1900	Chicago Photographic Salon	The Art Institute of Chicago, Chicago, Illinois, U.S.	
1900	Third Philadelphia Photographic Salon		Alfred Stieglitz, Gertrude Käsebier, Clarence H. White, Frank Eugene served as jury members
1900	Newark Camera Club	YMCA, Newark, Ohio, U.S.	
1901	New York Camera Club		
1901	Ninth Annual Exhibition of the Photographic Salon	Dudley Gallery at the Egyptian Hall, London, UK	Organized by the Linked Ring
1902	The "Photo-Secession" at the Arts Club	National Arts Club, New York City, U.S.	
1902	International Exposition	Turin, Italy	Awarded the silver medal
1903	The First International Exhibition for Contemporary Picture-Photography	Wiesbaden, Germany	Awarded unknown medal
1903	An Exhibition of Salon Photographs	The Photographic Society of Philadelphia	
1906	Fourteenth Annual Exhibition of the Photographic Salon	London, UK	
1907	Annual Member's Exhibition, New York Photo Club	New York City, U.S.	
1910	International Exhibition of Pictorial Photography	Buffalo Fine Arts Academy, Albright Art Gallery, Buffalo, NY, U.S.	
1911	International Exposition	Hamburg, Germany	Awarded unknown medal
1912	An Exhibition Illustrating the Progress of the Art of Photography	Montross Art Galleries, New York City, U.S.	
1914	Ema Spencer	Brooklyn Institute of Arts and Sciences, Brooklyn, New York City	Solo exhibition
1914	The Fifty-Ninth Annual Exhibition of the Royal Photographic Society	Gallery of the Royal Society of British Artists, London, UL	
1988	In Pursuit of Art Amid Difficulties	The Ohio State University, Newark Art Gallery, the Lancaster Library, and the Ohio Historical Society	Posthumous. Organized by the Ohio State University, Newark and the Licking County Historical Society
2020	No Mere Button-Pressers: Clarence H. White, Ema Spencer, and The Newark Camera Club	Columbus Museum of Art, Columbus, Ohio, U.S. and The Works, Newark, Ohio, U.S.	Posthumous

== Newspaper career ==
Early in her life Spencer held a variety of jobs at the Newark Advocate. In the 1880s she was managing three of the departments at the paper. In 1916 Spencer began writing a daily column called "The Melting Pot" under the pen name "Aunt Ca'line." She continued the column for 25 years, stopping only near the end of her life.
