= Thunder Over the Plains =

1953 film by André de Toth

- Theatrical release poster
- Directed by: Andre de Toth
- Written by: Russell S. Hughes
- Produced by: David Weisbart
- Starring: Randolph Scott; Lex Barker; Phyllis Kirk; Henry Hull
- Cinematography: Bert Glennon
- Edited by: James Moore
- Music by: David Buttolph
- Color process: WarnerColor
- Distributed by: Warner Bros. Pictures
- Release date: October 27, 1953
- Running time: 82 minutes
- Country: United States
- Language: English
- Box office: $1.6 million

Thunder Over The Plains is a 1953 American Western film directed by Andre de Toth and starring Randolph Scott with Lex Barker, Phyllis Kirk, Henry Hull, Elisha Cook, Jr. and Fess Parker. It was Barker's first film after starring in five Tarzan pictures.

== Plot ==
Set in 1869, during the Reconstruction Era following the Civil War, Texas had not yet been readmitted to the Union and carpetbaggers, hiding behind the legal protection of the Union Army of occupation, are levying high taxes through occupying local government positions and using the locals' financial distress to acquire assets at well below normal value.

Federal Captain Porter (Randolph Scott), a Texan who fought for the Union, has to enforce the letter of the law against the violent opposition of his own people. Porter also needs to contend with a strident fellow officer, Captain Bill Hodges. Porter arrests the rebel leader Ben Westman (Charles McGraw) on what he knows is a false murder charge. In trying to prove Westman's innocence, Porter himself becomes a wanted man.

== Cast ==
- Randolph Scott as Capt. David Porter
- Lex Barker as Capt. Bill Hodges
- Phyllis Kirk as Norah Porter
- Charles McGraw as Ben Westman
- Henry Hull as Lt. Col. Chandler
- Elisha Cook, Jr. as Joseph Standish
- Hugh Sanders as H. L. Balfour
- Lane Chandler as Mike Faraday
- James Brown as Conrad
- Fess Parker as Kirby
