= Lady, Let's Dance =

1944 film by Frank Woodruff

Lady, Let's Dance (1944)
- Directed by: Frank Woodruff
- Produced by: Trem Carr (executive producer)
- Cinematography: Mack Stengler
- Distributed by: Monogram Pictures
- Release date: 11 April 1944
- Running time: 88 min.
- Country: United States
- Language: English
- Budget: $500,000

Lady, Let's Dance is a 1944 black-and-white film directed by Frank Woodruff that was nominated for two Oscars. Produced by Monogram Studios, the film is unique as an ice skating musical.

Lady, Let's Dance stars ice skater Belita as herself, James Ellison, and Walter Catlett. Appearances also include ice skating artists Myrtle Godfrey and the renowned comedy ice team Werner Groebli & Hansruedi (Hans) Mauch (more commonly known as Frick and Frack).

Edward Kay's Oscar-nominated score included: "Golden Dreams", "Silver Shadows", "In the Days of Beau Brummel", "Ten Million Men and a Girl", "Dream of Dreams", "Rio", "Happy Hearts", "Esperanza", and the title song "Lady, Let's Dance".

Myrtle Godfrey sported the same green bonnet with ostrich plume worn by Vivien Leigh in Gone with the Wind.

== Plot ==
Belita travels to a California resort, where she is unexpectedly hired as a last minute dance team replacement. She becomes a national star while the handsome resort manager gets fired and becomes a drifter, until he ends up in the Army.

== Cast ==
- Belita as herself
- James Ellison as Jerry Gibson
- Walter Catlett as Timber Applegate
- Barbara Woodell as Dolores (Mamie Potts)
- Lucien Littlefield as Mr. Snodgrass
- Emmett Vogan as Stack
- Harry Harvey as Fraser
- Jack Rice as Given
- Werner Groebli as himself (a.k.a. 'Frick' – Frick and Frack)
- Hans Mauch as himself (a.k.a. 'Frack' – Frick and Frack)
- Eugene Mikeler as himself
- Maurice St. Clair as Manuelo
- Mitchell Ayres And His Orchestra
- Lou Bring And His Orchestra
- Henry Busse And His Orchestra
- Eddie Le Baron And His Orchestra
- Myrtle Godfrey as herself (Ice Skating artist)

== See also ==
- List of American films of 1944
