= Stella F. Simon =

American photographer (1878–1973)

- Born: Stella Furchgott, February 8, 1878; Charleston, South Carolina, U.S.
- Died: March 15, 1973 (aged 95); San Francisco, California, U.S.
- Known for: Photography; cinematography

Stella F. Simon (born Stella Furchgott, February 8, 1878 – March 15, 1973) was an American photographer, director and cinematographer who worked in both Germany and the United States. In 1928, she finished her only film, Hands: The Life and Love of a Gentle Sex, which is an avant-garde feminist film with imagery drawn from Europe and North America.

== Early life and education ==
Simon was born in Charleston, South Carolina. When she was 8 years old, her father Herman, a dry cargo wholesaler, moved his family to Colorado.

Simon developed her talent for musical composition at East Denver High School, from which she graduated in 1896. Simon married businessman Adolphe Simon in 1890, and they lived in Salt Lake City.

After Adolphe's death in 1917 she moved to New York City in 1923, where she raised her three sons on her own. She followed in the footsteps of photographer Clarence White and enrolled at the Clarence H. White School of Modern Photography. During this period Simon started to develop her photographic skills. White died in Mexico in 1925, leaving her to mourn his loss. She finally decided to pursue advanced studies in film, and in 1926 went to Berlin where she became a film-making student in Technische Hochschule.

Two years after enrolling, her film was distributed in both North America and Europe. It became famous as a feminist avant-garde work.

== Career ==
Simon's only film, Hands, earned her fame in both North America and Europe. In 1932, after its release, she returned to the United States and established a photographic studio. There, Simon focused on marketable projects such as portraits and advertising campaigns. The same year, Lilian Sabine wrote an article about Simon for the Women's Page of Abel's Photographic Weekly, which was published in three parts alongside a column entitled 'Among Us Girls!' which announced the advancements of women in the world of professional photography. During the Second World War, Simon decided to share her knowledge of photography with others by volunteering to train the Signal Corps in photography.

=== Photography ===
- Still-Life with Scissors (year unknown)
- Birch Tree (1900s)
- Skunk Cabbage (1923)
- Tennis Match (1923)
- 59th Street Bridge, New York City, 1928 (1928)
- Composition with Violin and Violin Still Life (1930)
- Brown Ottoman, Green Screen (1932)

=== Filmography ===
- Hands: The Life and Love of a Gentle Sex (1927–1928)

==== Hands ====
Hands: The Life and Love of a Gentle Sex (1927–1928) was the first and only film directed by Simon. Completed in 1928, the film was a collaboration with Miklo Bándy and became famous as an experimental film typical of avant-garde ideology. The narratives in the film emerge from the actions and movements of human hands. Simon employed a Hollywood-style narrative and divided her film into three clear sections: Prelude, Variations and Finale. The film was first screened at midnight on February 16, 1929, at the Gloria Palast in Berlin. It was screened in Paris at an avant-garde theatre and Eighth Street Theatre, and in New York City at the Julien Levy Gallery. Despite the fact that the film was a collaboration, Bandy was credited as the film's director on all of the extant film prints, with Simon only getting credit for the idea of the film. In later reviews, however, she was acknowledged as the film's primary director.

In recent years, Hands has been re-historicized as an early example of feminist filmmaking. In 2005, Jennifer Wild wrote an essay about the feminist aesthetics of Hands:

The use of human hands as characters in a dance inspired narrative are used to explore female experience and representation. By drawing upon experimental traditions found in international art, film, and photography movements of the 1920s, Simon transforms a simple melodramatic love story into an avant-garde feminist short film.

— Jennifer Wild, An Artist's Hands: Stella Simon, Modernist Synthesis, and Narrative Resistance

Rosanna Maule and Catherine Russell have also written about Hands, stating for Framework: The Journal of Cinema and Media that Hands "builds on the male-modernist aesthetics of international photography while also being deeply inflected by Hollywood paradigms of gendered narrative."

== Later life ==
In the 1940s Simon closed her photographic studio and lived out her later years with her son Julian, working as a book restorer at the San Francisco Public Library. Her son Louis sold her photographic equipment at the end of the Second World War. On March 15, 1975, she died in San Francisco at the age of 95. Her photographic prints were donated to libraries and galleries in the United States, and her negative plates were donated to American collections including the New York Public Library and the Institute for the Federal Theatre Project at George Mason University.
