= JoAnn Dean Killingsworth =

American actress

- Born: September 23, 1923; Minneapolis, Minnesota, US
- Died: June 20, 2015 (aged 91); Brea, California, US
- Occupation(s): Actress, dancer, figure skater, publisher
- Known for: First Snow White at Disneyland

JoAnn Dean Killingsworth, often credited professionally as JoAnn Dean (September 23, 1923 – June 20, 2015), was an American actress, dancer and professional figure skater. Dean became the first person to portray Snow White at Disneyland upon the theme park's opening on July 17, 1955. Since Dean's debut in 1955, more than 100 actresses have played Snow White at Disneyland.

== Early life ==
She was born JoAnn Dean on September 23, 1923, in Minneapolis, Minnesota, as the youngest of her family's two children, including her older brother, Donovan Dean. She was raised in Joliet, Illinois.

In 1931, her family relocated to Los Angeles, California, during the Great Depression. Her mother, Marion, a widow, initially opened a small canteen restaurant at the Beverly Manor apartment house in Hollywood, located in the vicinity of Beverly Boulevard and Normandie Avenue, to cover the family's $45 monthly rent on an apartment. Marion Dean sold a complete meal from her restaurant, featuring "soup, salad, entree, vegetable, baked potato, bread, coffee, and dessert, for 35 cents per meal." JoAnn Dean began waitressing at her mother's restaurant when she was 12 years old, while her older brother worked as a dishwasher.

The restaurant proved successful enough that Dean was able to enroll in dance lessons from the earnings.

== Career ==
In 1939, Killingsworth, who was 15 years old, convinced her mother to allow her to audition for an ice skating show at the Long Beach ice rink. She was successful in the audition and was chosen for the show. Once the Long Beach show was over, Dean was hired to skate in "It Happens on Ice," an ice "extravaganza" performing at the Coconut Grove nightclub, located in the Ambassador Hotel in Los Angeles.

She was soon performing on "Ice Queen of Norway," a traveling "Hollywood Ice Revue" created by the Norwegian skater, Sonja Henie, including in New York City. Killingsworth was partnered with actor and dancer, Gene Nelson, during the ice show. Nelson became her long-term professional dance partner.

After leaving Henie's show, she teamed with Gene Nelson once again. The duo performed at the Center Theatre in New York City for a show called "It Happens on Ice" for two years. Killingsworth retired from ice skating at age 18 to focus on dancing in the entertainment industry. She then moved back to Los Angeles to pursue film acting and dancing roles.

She also did some print modelling as well, appearing in advertisements.

JoAnn Dean Killingsworth appeared on screen in dozens of films. By her own estimation, Dean acted, performed and danced in more than 100 films during her career. Her feature film credits included Silver Skates in 1943 with British Olympic skater Belita; Something for the Boys, which starred Carmen Miranda in 1944; State Fair in 1945; Nob Hill in 1945; Rainbow Over Texas in 1946 opposite Roy Rogers; Lullaby of Broadway in 1951; and two films released in 1954, Sabrina and Red Garters, opposite Rosemary Clooney. She dressed in costume as a demitasse and saucer to dance in Betty Grable's 1945 musical, Diamond Horseshoe.

Killingsworth appears on the movie poster for Lullaby of Broadway, next to the film's star, Doris Day. (Killingsworth also appeared in the 1954 film).

She was as a member of the "Redettes," The Red Skelton Show's dance troupe from 1953 to 1956.

=== Snow White ===
Dean performed long-term with her professional dance partner, actor and dancer Gene Nelson. Nelson's then-wife, film and theater choreographer Miriam Nelson, was casting performers for an ABC television special in preparation for the 1955 opening of the company's first theme park, Disneyland, to be located in Anaheim, California. It was Miriam Nelson who cast Dean as Disneyland's first Snow White. Nelson recalled her impressions of Dean in a 2014 interview with Orange Coast Magazine, "I thought JoAnn looked like Disney's Snow White, with her dark bangs...She was very enthusiastic, bubbly and always in good spirits. I knew she'd do a good job." Killingsworth, a 5-foot-3 dancer with dark brunette hair, was described as a bearing a strong resemblance to Disney's animated Snow White.

In 1955, Killingsworth, who was 31 years old at the time, received a phone call inviting her to play Snow White for a 90-minute American Broadcasting Company (ABC) television special on the opening day of Disneyland. Killingsworth had never heard of ABC, Disneyland, or Anaheim, California, at the time. However, she accepted the one-day job, becoming Disneyland's very first Snow White at the parks opening day on July 17, 1955.

30,000 guests and dignitaries attended Disneyland's opening ceremonies (and ABC simulcast) on July 17, 1955. 11,000 people were guests of Walt Disney, mostly Disney employees, their families, members of the media, as well as celebrities, including Sammy Davis Jr., Frank Sinatra, and Debbie Reynolds. An additional 11,000 people were on hand for the opening thanks to counterfeit tickets for the event. The temperature was 100 degrees.

Those in attendance watched the floats parade down Main Street, U.S.A. for the opening ceremony. An additional 90 million television viewers watched the television special, which was broadcast nationwide on the American Broadcasting Company (ABC). Killingsworth's Snow White was the only Disney Princess to receive her own float at the inaugural parade.

At the conclusion of the opening ceremony and television special, an announcer ordered Disneyland's Fantasyland drawbridge to be lowered, opening the park "in the name of the children of the world." Killingsworth's Snow White and the other costumed Disney characters, including the Seven Dwarfs, "led" hundreds of children across the bridge into Disneyland. In reality, most ran across the bridge in a hurry to enter the park. In a 2014 interview with the Orange County Register, she remembered that she and the other cast members ran across just before the children charged the bridge, "We turned around and tried to run pretty."

Her tenure as Disneyland's first Snow White ended at the closing of the theme park's first day. It was the only time the actress played Snow White at Disneyland. According to Killingsworth, it remained her best known role.

However, Killingsworth's role as Disneyland's first Snow White remained largely forgotten until 1987, which marked the 50th anniversary of the release of Disney's 1937 animated feature film, Snow White and the Seven Dwarfs. That year, The Walt Disney Company celebrated 50th anniversary by re-releasing Snow White in theaters and public appearances by the character, including the Smithsonian Institution and the Rose Bowl.

Disney also launched a search for actresses who had played Snow White at Disneyland, Disney World and its overseas parks for a planned reunion. However, the company could not locate or identify Disneyland's first Snow White from its opening day, since Killingsworth had been employed by ABC, rather than the Walt Disney Company, for the television special. Killingsworth remained unaware of Disney's planned 1987 Snow White reunion until she was told by a friend about the planned event. She contacted the company and attended the event. Killingsworth was one of approximately 50 former Snow Whites who attended the reunion. She told the Associated Press at the time, "I didn't realize Disney was looking for me...If I had, I would have called somebody and said, 'Here I am. Here's Snow White'." Bob Roth, Disney's spokesperson at the time, confirmed that "I'm really quite certain this is the right person." The company gave her a jewelry box to mark the 50th anniversary.

== Personal life ==
In 1958, Killingsworth and her then husband, Jim Killingsworth, moved from Hollywood to the Balboa Island area of Newport Beach, California. Killingsworth did not want to commute from Balboa Island to Hollywood, so the move effectively ended her dancing career in the entertainment industry. In a 2014 interview, she reiterated that she had no regrets about the end of her dancing career due to the move to Newport Beach, "I’ve had a great life."

Killingsworth and her husband published two publications focusing on Orange County, California. Soon after moving to Balboa, the couple launched a weekly tabloid newspaper, The Newporter, in 1959. Their second publication, Orange County Illustrated, was a lifestyle magazine focusing on the Orange Coast. The magazine ceased publication in 1977 following the couple's divorce. Killingsworth became a salesperson at Neiman Marcus after the magazine's closure.

She suffered a crushed vertebra in her sleep at her Balboa home during the 1970s when she was in her early 50s. The unusual injury limited her mobility at the time. To compensate, Killingsworth took up painting. Most of her work featured scenery or wildlife from destinations she had visited, including Spain, the home of Paul Cézanne in France, and wild gerenuks from Africa. Killingsworth sold only one of her paintings, a piece featuring fish, to Robert Guggenheim of the Guggenheim family. Guggenheim has noticed the painting hanging in her Newport Beach magazine office and paid $200 for the artwork. Most of her other paintings were gifted to friends and family. An exhibition of her art was held at her retirement community in Brea, California.

Killingsworth moved from Balboa Island to the Oakmont of Capriana retirement village in Brea, California, in 2013.

== Death ==
JoAnn Dean Killingsworth died from cancer at her home in Brea, California, on June 20, 2015, at the age of 91. She was survived by her stepsons, Bill and Larry Killingsworth, and her brother, Donovan Dean. Her former husband, Jim Killingsworth, died in 1993.

Her death came less than one month before the 60th anniversary of Disneyland and her debut as the park's first ever Snow White.
