= The Hunted (1948 film) =

1948 film by Jack Bernhard

- Theatrical release poster
- Directed by: Jack Bernhard
- Written by: Steve Fisher
- Produced by: Scott R. Dunlap
- Starring: Preston Foster; Belita; Pierre Watkin; Edna Holland
- Cinematography: Harry Neumann
- Edited by: Richard V. Heermance
- Music by: Edward J. Kay
- Production company: Allied Artists Pictures
- Distributed by: Allied Artists Pictures
- Release date: April 7, 1948 (United States)
- Running time: 84 minutes
- Country: United States
- Language: English

The Hunted is a 1948 American film noir crime film starring Preston Foster, Belita, Pierre Watkin and Edna Holland. It was directed by Jack Bernhard.

== Plot ==
A detective helps send his girlfriend to prison for her alleged involvment in a jewel robbery, despite her claims that she was framed. After her release from prison the detective won't leave her alone because he suspects that she has committed a murder. He is still in love with her but continues to hunt her down. There is an ice skating scene by Belita, who was an ice skater in real life.

== Cast ==
- Preston Foster as Johnny Saxon
- Belita as Laura Mead
- Pierre Watkin as Simon Rand, Attorney
- Edna Holland as Miss Turner
- Russell Hicks as Dan Meredith Chief of Detectives
- Frank Ferguson as Paul Harrison
- Joseph Crehan as Police Captain
- Larry J. Blake as Hollis Smith
- Cathy Carter as Sally Winters
- Charles McGraw as Detective
- Tris Coffin as Detective

== Production ==
The film was announced in 1946 and was one of Allied Artists' most expensive movies.

== Reception ==
=== Critical response ===
Film critic Leonard Maltin said of the film, "Low-budget noir has a hard-boiled sheen but a prosaic, overlong treatment; it even finds time for one of Belita's ice skating routines!"
