= The Gangster (1947 film) =

1947 film by Gordon Wiles

- Theatrical release poster
- Directed by: Gordon Wiles
- Screenplay by: Daniel Fuchs; Dalton Trumbo
- Based on: Low Company by Daniel Fuchs
- Produced by: Frank King; Maurice King
- Starring: Barry Sullivan; Belita; Joan Lorring; Akim Tamiroff
- Cinematography: Paul Ivano
- Edited by: Walter A. Thompson
- Music by: Louis Gruenberg
- Production company: King Brothers Productions
- Distributed by: Allied Artists Pictures
- Release date: November 25, 1947 (United States)
- Running time: 84 minutes
- Country: United States
- Language: English

The Gangster (aka Low Company) is a 1947 American crime film noir starring Barry Sullivan, Belita, Joan Lorring and Akim Tamiroff. It was directed by Gordon Wiles, with a screenplay by Daniel Fuchs, based on his novel Low Company (1937).

== Plot ==
Shubunka is a racketeer preying upon small-time operators on the New Jersey boardwalk. He has a girlfriend, Nancy Starr, a showgirl, and offers protection to a New York beachfront cafe owned by Nick Jammey. A more powerful rival, Cornell, seeks to take over Shubunka's operations and territory.

Karty, a regular customer, has gambling debts and has stolen money from his brothers-in-law's garage. He begs Shubunka for help but is refused. Dorothy, the cafe's cashier, quits her job, disillusioned by Shubunka's involvement in the rackets and concern for no one but himself.

Cornell wants to take over Shubunka's rackets. Jammey gives him inside information on Shubunka's organization. After a couple of Cornell's men beat him up on a picnic, Shubunka angrily accuses Nancy of having him set up. Karty has disappeared in the meantime, but when his frantic wife appeals to Shubunka for help, he again infuriates Dorothy by saying no.

Karty gets into a fight with Jammey at the cafe and accidentally kills him with a skillet. Cornell mistakenly believes Shubunka to be responsible and goes after him. This time Nancy does betray Shubunka, having been bribed with a bogus Broadway stage offer by Cornell.

Shubunka runs to Dorothy for help, but she declines, calling it just deserts for his unwillingness to help anyone else. With nowhere to hide, Shubunka is killed by Cornell in the street, just before the police arrive to place Cornell under arrest.

== Cast ==
- Barry Sullivan as Shubunka
- Belita as Nancy Starr
- Joan Lorring as Dorothy
- Akim Tamiroff as Nick Jammey
- Harry Morgan as Shorty (credited as Henry Morgan)
- John Ireland as Karty
- Sheldon Leonard as Cornell
- Fifi D'Orsay as Mrs. Ostroleng
- Virginia Christine as Mrs. Karty
- Elisha Cook Jr. as Oval
- Ted Hecht as Swain
- Leif Erickson as Beaumont
- Charles McGraw as Dugas
- John Kellogg as Sterling
- Shelley Winters as Hazel (Uncredited)
- Don Haggerty as Thug Messenger
- Rex Downing as Boy With Note
- Blossom Rock as House Mistress
- Peter Whitney as Karthy's Brother-in-law
- Edwin Maxwell as Johnny - Politician
- Griff Barnett as Dorothy's Father
- Murray Alper as Eddie
- Sid Melton as Stage Manager
- Jeff Corey as Karthy's Brother-in-law
- Larry Steers as Headwaiter
- Dewey Robinson as Pool Player
- Billy Gray as Little Boy
- Mike Lally as Henchman
- Greta Granstedt played a Minor role
- Gene Collins as Boy
- Phil Arnold played a Minor Role
- Mikel Conrad as Thug
- Dolores Castle as Cigarette Girl
- Norma Jean Nilsson played as Little Girl

== Reception ==
=== Critical response ===
Film historian Blake Lucas, discussed the film noir aspects of the film, writing in 1992, ...The Gangster is arty and affected, as director Gordon Wiles has gravitated toward the creation of a theatrical rather than a visual impression. A film - and the most visually exciting of film noir bear this out - can show discernment and restraint when there are pretentious aspects implicit in the material."

Film critic Dennis Schwartz gave the film a mixed review, writing in 2004, "A Poverty Row crime melodrama that has its moments of traditional crime but moves along not in the traditional way of tracing the rise and fall of its protagonist. Instead, the film noir is more concerned with establishing a forlorn mood and being artistically stylish, as director Gordon Wiles (who won an Oscar as art director for the 1931 Transatlantic) creates a theatrical piece that is unnecessarily stagelike and much too pretentious for the modest storyline. It is adapted by screenwriter Daniel Fuchs from his book Low Company, and much of its too arty nature is attributed by rumor to the uncredited role Dalton Trumbo played in the screenplay."

TV Guide gave the film a positive review, writing in 2011, "The Gangster is an offbeat entry in the film noir genre, one that places the accent on the psychological. Though at times muddled, the script strives to maintain a deeper approach than such films as The Public Enemy or Al Capone. In its day this film was considered something of an artistic triumph..."
