= Frick and Frack =

Comedic figure-skating duo

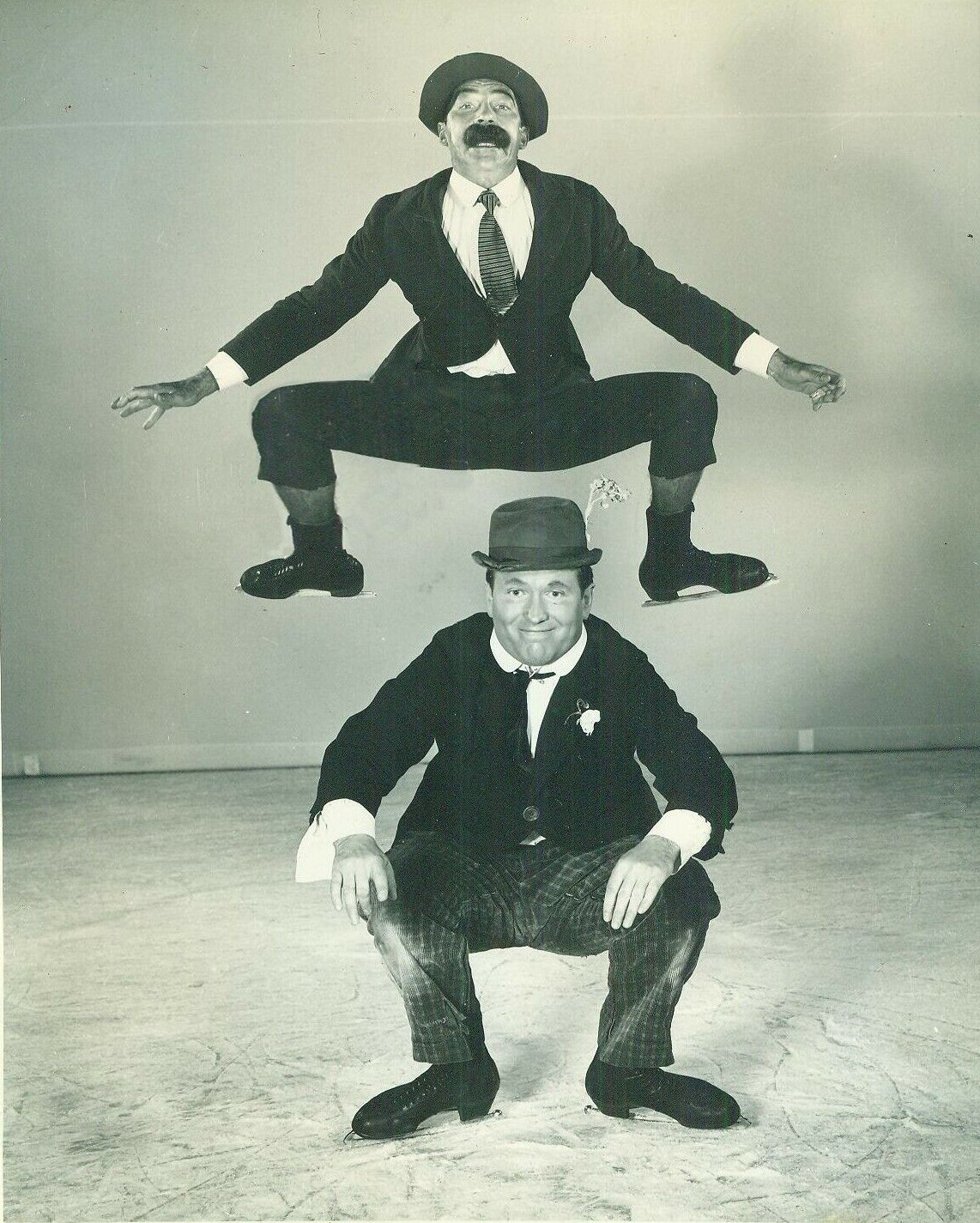
1953 press photo of Frick (bottom) and Frack (top)

Frick and Frack were a comedic ice skating duo of Swiss skaters who went to the United States in 1937 and joined the original Ice Follies show. "Frick" was Werner Groebli (21 April 1915 – 14 April 2008), born in Basel. "Frack" was Hans Rudolf "Hansruedi" Mauch (2 May 1919 – 4 June 1979), also born in Basel. Frick and Frack were known for often skating in Alpine Lederhosen while performing eccentric tricks on ice, including the "cantilever spread-eagle", created by Groebli; and Mauch's "rubber legs", twisting and bending his legs while skating in a spread eagle position. Only a few skaters have successfully performed the duo's routines since.

Michael Mauch, the son of Hans, described the origin of their names: "Frick took his name from a small village in Switzerland; Frack is a Swiss-German word for a frock coat, which my father used to wear in the early days of their skating act. They put the words together as a typical Swiss joke."

== History ==
Frick and Frack found fame with the Ice Follies, a revue promoted by Eddie Shipstad and his brother Roy, which began in 1936 and ran for almost 50 years. They also reached a worldwide audience when they began appearing in films, including the Monogram Pictures production Lady, Let's Dance in 1944. Their association lasted so long, and they were at one time so well known, that their names became a household term in many languages.

Frick and Frack skated in the Ice Follies for many years until Hans Mauch (Frack) contracted osteomyelitis. He retired in 1953, and died on 4 June 1979 in Long Beach, California, at the age of 60. He had been married to Mary M. Elchlepp of Minneapolis, one of the original Ice Folliettes.

Performing well into his late years, Werner Groebli continued on as "Mr. Frick" until an accident forced him to retire in 1980. He appeared as a contestant on TV's original Match Game on NBC in the 1960s. Groebli lived in the Palm Springs, California, area for over 10 years until the death of his wife, the former Yvonne Baumgartner, in 2002. He was featured on a PBS TV special in 1999.

Groebli died on 14 April 2008 in Zürich at the age of 92. David Thomas, one of his skating partners after Mauch retired, announced his death from complications after breaking a leg at a nursing home outside of Zürich.

== In popular culture ==
"Frick and Frack" has become an English slang term used to refer to two people so closely associated as to be indistinguishable. Comic radio mechanics Tom and Ray Magliozzi performed for years under the name Click and Clack.

In the TV series Blue Bloods, Detective Danny Reagan, when interrogating pairs of male suspects who were easily caught, intimidates them by calling them Frick and Frack, implying that they are fools to be caught and there is plenty of evidence of their crimes due to their stupidity.
