= Belita =

British figure skater, actress, and dancer (1923–2005)

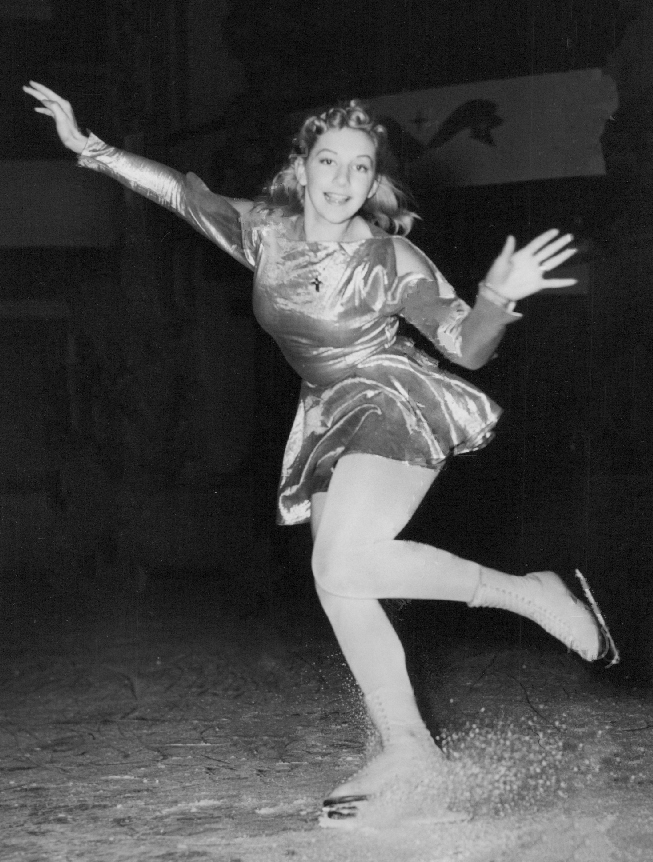
- Belita in 1940
- Born: Belita Gladys Lyne Jepson-Turner; 21 October 1923 (Note: Or 25 October 1923, sources differ.); Nether Wallop, Hampshire, England
- Died: 18 December 2005 (aged 82); Montpeyroux, Hérault, France
- Years active: 1947–1963
- Spouses: Joel McGinnis (m. 1946; div. 1956) James Berwick (né James Kenny) (m. 1967; d. 2000)

Belita Gladys Lyne Jepson-Turner (21 October 1923 – 18 December 2005), known professionally as Belita, was a British Olympic figure skater, dancer, and film actress.

== Early years ==
Belita was born at the Garlogs house in Nether Wallop, Hampshire, to Major William Jepson-Turner and wife Gladys Olive Jepson-Turner née Lyne-Stivens. She skated (as Belita Jepson-Turner) for the United Kingdom in the 1936 Winter Olympics, where she placed 16th in the singles, then her career turned towards Hollywood. She had classical Russian ballet training which carried over into her skating. As a young ballerina, she was partner to Anton Dolin, appearing with the Dolin-Markova Ballet.

From December 1937 to May 1938 she danced in the ice dance show called "La Feerie Blanche" (The White Fairy) at Mogador Theater in Paris under the direction of Mitty Goldin.

== Film career ==
Belita appeared in films, making several highly profitable productions for Monogram Pictures, including skating in Silver Skates (1943) and Lady, Let's Dance (1944), skating and playing the dramatic lead in the film noir Suspense (1946), the female lead in The Gangster (1947), and skating again and playing the dramatic lead in The Hunted (1948). For a brief period, she was Monogram's highest-paid star. Later she worked with A-list stars Charles Laughton in The Man on the Eiffel Tower (1949), and Clark Gable in Never Let Me Go (1953). In 1957 she danced with Fred Astaire in Silk Stockings.

== Retirement ==
In 1956, she retired from skating, and gave up show business altogether after 1963. She appeared briefly on the ice at Madison Square Garden in New York City in 1981 in a short production based on "Solitude" by Duke Ellington. As to skating, she said, “I hated the ice. I hated the cold, the smell, everything about it,” and that she did it “for the money.”

== Personal life ==
Belita married Joel McGinnis in 1946; they divorced in 1956. She married Irish actor James Berwick (né Kenny) in 1967; they remained married until his death in 2000. Both marriages were childless.

Belita retired from her second career, as a landscape nursery owner, and later relocated to Montpeyroux, Hérault, France, where she died in 2005, aged 82.

== Filmography ==
Year	Title	Role	Notes
1941	Ice-Capades	Ice Capades Skater	Uncredited
1943	Silver Skates	Herself	
1944	Lady, Let's Dance	Herself	
1946	Suspense	Roberta Leonard, aka Roberta Elva	
1947	The Gangster	Nancy	
1948	The Hunted	Laura Mead	
1949	The Man on the Eiffel Tower	Gisella Heurtin	
1953	Never Let Me Go	Valentina Alexandrovna	
1956	Invitation to the Dance	The Femme Fatale in 'Ring Around the Rosy'	
1957	Silk Stockings	Vera	Uncredited
1958	The Key	Canteen Hostess	Uncredited
