= Soubrette Sings Broadway Hit Songs =

Soubrette: Blossom Dearie Sings Broadway Hit Songs

Studio album by Blossom Dearie
- Released: 1960
- Recorded: February 19 and 22, 1960
- Genre: Jazz
- Label: Verve Records
- Producer: Norman Granz, Blossom Dearie

Blossom Dearie chronology
My Gentleman Friend (1961)	Soubrette: Blossom Dearie Sings Broadway Hit Songs (1960)	Blossom Dearie Sings Rootin' Songs (1963)

Professional ratings
Review scores
Source	Rating
Allmusic	3/5 stars
The Penguin Guide to Jazz Recordings	3/4 stars

Soubrette: Blossom Dearie Sings Broadway Hit Songs is a 1960 studio album by Blossom Dearie, with an orchestra arranged by Russell Garcia.

This was Dearie's first album recorded with full orchestral arrangements.

== Track listing ==
1. "Guys and Dolls" (Frank Loesser) – 2:52
2. "Confession" (Howard Dietz, Arthur Schwartz) – 2:44
3. "Rhode Island Is Famous for You" (Dietz, Schwartz) – 2:14
4. "To Keep My Love Alive" (Richard Rodgers, Lorenz Hart) – 3:26
5. "Too Good for the Average Man" (Rodgers, Hart) – 3:31
6. "The Gentleman Is a Dope" (Oscar Hammerstein II, Rodgers) – 4:19
7. "Always True to You in My Fashion" (Cole Porter) – 2:52
8. "Napoleon" (Harold Arlen, Yip Harburg) – 4:19
9. "Life Upon the Wicked Stage" (Hammerstein, Jerome Kern) – 2:42
10. "The Physician" (Porter) – 2:15
11. "Love Is the Reason" (Dorothy Fields, Schwartz) – 3:37
12. "Buckle Down, Winsocki" (Ralph Blane, Hugh Martin) – 1:49

Tracks 1, 3, 6, 7, 8, 11 recorded on February 19, 1960. Tracks 2, 4, 5, 9, 10, 12 recorded February 22, 1960.

== Personnel ==
- Blossom Dearie – piano, vocals
- Russell Garcia – conductor, arranger
- Al Harding – reeds
- Paul Harn – flute
- Red Mitchell – bass
- Mel Lewis – drums
- Gus Donahue – copyist
  - Tracks 1, 3, 6, 7, 8, 11
- Jerome Kasper, Charles Gentry and Dave Pell - reeds
- Jimmy Rowles - piano
- Larry Bunker - xylophone
  - Tracks 2, 4, 5, 9, 10, 12
- Barney Kessel - guitar
- Victor Feldman - xylophone
