= Blossom Dearie (disambiguation) =

Blossom Dearie was an American jazz singer and pianist.

Blossom Dearie may also refer to:

- Blossom Dearie (album), a studio album recorded in 1956
- Blossom Dearie Sings Comden and Green, a 1959 album
- Blossom Dearie Sings Rootin' Songs, a 1963 album
