= Blossom Dearie Plays April in Paris =

Studio album by Blossom Dearie
- Released: 1987
- Recorded: 1954–1955
- Genre: Jazz
- Length: 34:22
- Labels: Barclay, Fresh Sounds Records

Blossom Dearie Plays April in Paris (also called Blossom Dearie Sings and Plays for Dancing) is a 1987 studio album by Blossom Dearie. It features Bobby Jaspar, her husband, who collaborated with her on the album, accompanying her on flute. The album was recorded in 1954 and 1955 but not released until 1987 on the Barclay and Fresh Sounds Records labels. The first four songs on the album were recorded in 1955 and are taken from another album titled Blossom Dearie Piano. The remaining songs were recorded in 1956.

== Track listing ==
1. "Old Devil Moon" (Burton Lane) - 2:35
2. "Autumn In New York" (Vernon Duke) - 4:02
3. "Flamingo" (Edmund Anderson, Theodor Grouya) - 3:10
4. "There Will Never Be Another You" (Harry Warren) - 2:08
5. "The Continental" (Con Conrad, Herbert Magidson) - 2:46
6. "The Boy Next Door" (Hugh Martin, Ralph Blane) - 2:51
7. "They Can't Take That Away from Me" (George & Ira Gershwin) - 2:35
8. "(There Ought to Be A) Moonlight Saving Time" (Harry Richman, Irving Kahal) - 2:33
9. "The Surrey with the Fringe on Top" (Richard Rodgers, Oscar Hammerstein ll) - 2:54
10. "April in Paris" (Vernon Duke, Yip Harburg) - 2:53
11. "Blue Moon" (Richard Rodgers, Lorenz Hart) - 2:41
12. "Down the Depths of the 90th Floor" (Cole Porter) - 3:21
