= Once Upon a Summertime (disambiguation) =

"Once Upon a Summertime" is the title of the American version of a French song, recorded by various artists.

Once Upon a Summertime may also refer to:

- Once Upon a Summertime (Blossom Dearie album), 1959
- Once Upon a Summertime (Chet Baker album), 1980
- Once Upon a Summertime, a short musical film by Reginald LeBorg
