= May I Come In? =

Studio album by Blossom Dearie
- Released: 1964
- Recorded: February 13–15, 1964
- Genre: Vocal jazz
- Label: Capitol
- Producer: Dave Cavanaugh

Blossom Dearie chronology
Blossom Dearie Sings Rootin' Songs (1963)	May I Come In? (1964)	Blossom Time at Ronnie Scott's (1964)

Professional ratings
Review scores
Source	Rating
AllMusic	2.5/5 stars

May I Come In? is a 1964 studio album by Blossom Dearie, arranged by Jack Marshall.

== Track listing ==
1. "Something Happens to Me" (Marvin Fisher, Jack Segal) – 2:02
2. "I'm in Love Again" (Cy Coleman, Peggy Lee, Bill Schluger) – 2:45
3. "When Sunny Gets Blue" (Fisher, Segal) – 2:09
4. "Quiet Nights of Quiet Stars" (Antônio Carlos Jobim, Gene Lees) – 2:52
5. "Don't Wait Too Long" (Sunny Skylar) – 2:16
6. "I Wish You Love" (Albert A. Beach, Charles Trenet) – 2:06
7. "Charade" (Henry Mancini, Johnny Mercer) – 1:54
8. "May I Come In?" (Fisher, Segal) – 2:13
9. "I'm Old Fashioned" (Jerome Kern, Mercer) – 2:31
10. "Love Is a Necessary Evil" (Fisher, Segal) – 2:26
11. "The Best Is Yet to Come" (Coleman, Carolyn Leigh) – 2:48
12. "Put on a Happy Face" (Lee Adams, Charles Strouse) – 2:12

== Personnel ==
- Blossom Dearie – vocal, piano
- Jack Marshall – arranger, conductor
