= Once Upon a Summertime =

English-language version of "La valse des lilas"

Song by Blossom Dearie

from the album Once Upon a Summertime
- Released: 1959
- Recorded: September 1958
- Genre: Traditional pop
- Length: 2:43
- Label: Verve
- Composers: Michel Legrand, Eddie Barclay
- Lyricists: Eddy Marnay, Johnny Mercer
- Producers: Norman Granz, Blossom Dearie

"Once Upon a Summertime" is the title of the American version (with lyrics from Johnny Mercer) of a French song written by Michel Legrand, Eddie Barclay and Eddy Marnay.

The French original is La valse des lilas.

== Notable recordings ==
- Blossom Dearie – Once Upon a Summertime (1959), Blossom Time at Ronnie Scott's (1966)
- Tony Bennett – I Wanna Be Around (1963)
- Miles Davis – Quiet Nights (1963)
- Sarah Vaughan – Star Eyes (1963)
- Monica Zetterlund and Bill Evans – Waltz for Debby (1964)
- Carmen Mcrae – Second to None (1964)
- Astrud Gilberto – Look to the Rainbow (1966)
- Barbra Streisand – Je m'appelle Barbra (1966)
- The Walker Brothers - Images (1967)
- Oscar Peterson – Walking the Line(1971)
- June Christy – Impromptu (1977) with the Lou Levy Sextet
- Chet Baker – Once Upon a Summertime (1980)
- Maria Farantouri – 17 Songs (1990)
- Betty Carter – It's Not About the Melody (1992)
- Betty Carter with Vienna Art Orchestra - Quiet Ways: Ballads (1997)
