= Manhattan (song) =

1925 song by Rodgers and Hart

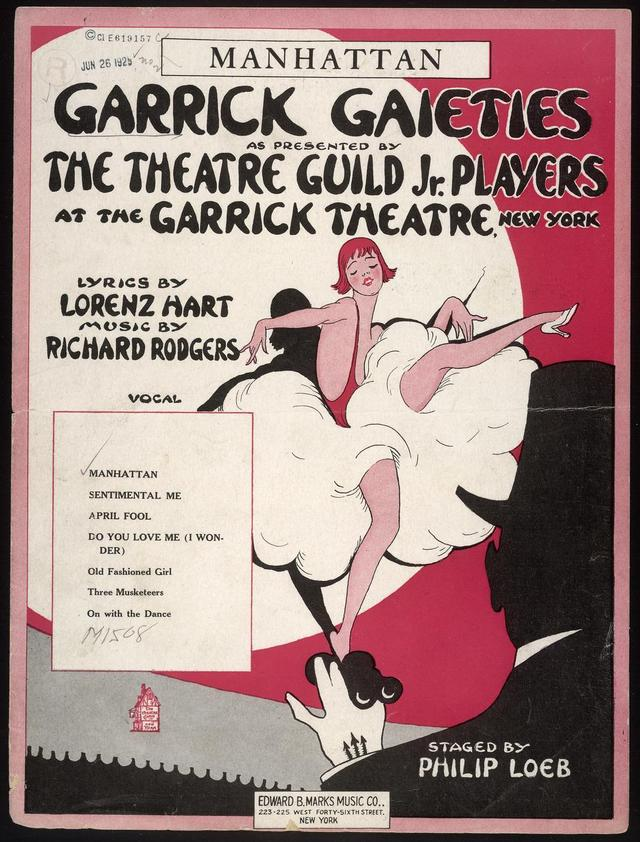
- Sheet music cover (1925)

Song
- Published: 1925 by Edward B. Marks Music Co.
- Genre: Pop
- Composer: Richard Rodgers
- Lyricist: Lorenz Hart

Audio sample
- Recording of Manhattan, performed by The Knickerbockers (1925): file; help

"Manhattan" is a popular song and part of the Great American Songbook. The music was written by Richard Rodgers and the lyrics by Lorenz Hart for the 1925 revue Garrick Gaieties.

In 1925, Richard Rodgers and Lorenz Hart had been song-writing partners for six years, but had only sold one song to a Broadway show, "Any Old Place with You", which was bought by former vaudeville performer, now producer, Lew Fields. On August 26, 1919, he inserted it into his current musical, A Lonely Romeo, at the Casino Theater. (Inserting new songs into running musicals was a common practice at that time.)

Since then, they had not sold another. They continued writing, but were only able to donate songs to a long list of amateur or benefit shows. Rodgers was so discouraged he briefly considered going into a business when they got an offer from the prestigious Theater Guild to contribute all the songs for a two–performance benefit musical review on Sunday, May 17, 1925. Called Garrick Gaieties, it was to raise money for curtains for the Theater Guild's new theater. Given the Theater Guild’s reputation, they accepted. Rodgers also conducted the eleven-member orchestra.

Halfway through the matinee's second act, Holloway and Cochran performed the song in front of a plain curtain. It stopped the show. They sang two encores, using all the lyrics they had. Rodgers and Hart knew they had a hit, but there was only one more scheduled performance. They convinced the Guild to present matinees during the next week, before the evening performances of the Guild's current production. When these performances were all standing-room-only, Rodgers convinced the Guild to close its current production and replace it with Garrick Gaieties. It ran for 211 performances with both getting $50 a week in royalties and Rodgers an additional $83 a week for conducting. Within a year, they had three shows on Broadway simultaneously.

The song was performed by Sterling Holloway in the original 1925 production. It has been performed by the Supremes, Lee Wiley, Oscar Peterson, Blossom Dearie, Tony Martin, Dinah Washington, Ella Fitzgerald, and Mel Torme, among many others. It is often known as "We'll Have Manhattan" based on the opening line.

== Lyrics and story ==
The song describes, in several choruses, the simple delights of Manhattan for a young couple in love. The joke is that these "delights" are really some of the worst, or cheapest, sights that New York has to offer; for example, the stifling, humid stench of the subway in summertime is described as "balmy breezes", while the noisy, grating pushcarts on Mott Street are "gently gliding by". A particular Hart delight is the use of New York dialect to rhyme "spoil" with "boy and goil".

In the first stanza, the couple is obviously too poor to afford a honeymoon to the popular summertime destinations of "Niag'ra" or "other places", so they claim to be happy to "save our fares". In the second stanza, they go for a walk down Delancey Street, which was in the 1920s a boisterous commercial strip, part of the working-class Lower East Side. In the third stanza, they plan to go to Greenwich Village, to watch "Modern men itch to be free". "And Bowling Green you'll see with me" links to the previous paeon to liberty in that after the reading of the Declaration of Independence in 1776, a mob marched on Bowling Green and tore down a statue of King George III. In the fourth stanza, it is revealed that the only rural retreat they can afford to go to is "Yonkers", and the only restaurant they can afford is to "starve together in Childs'" – a restaurant chain serving inexpensive meals, popular with middle- and working-class people. In later stanzas, other places they will go to are likewise free – Central Park, "the Bronx Zoo", Coney Island, Brighton Beach, and to view the much-criticized statue of "Civic Virtue". The final reference to Inspiration Point (Hudson River Greenway), along Old Riverside Drive, refers to how it was a well-known meeting place for lovers, and 'At The Station House we'll end" suggests they may be arrested for public indecency, and couldn't care less.

== Versions ==
Makers of Melody (1929)

Since its debut, it has regularly appeared in popular culture. Early hits in 1925 were by Ben Selvin and Paul Whiteman. It was first heard on film in the 1929 short Makers of Melody, a tribute to Rodgers and Hart sung by Ruth Tester and Allan Gould. Since then, it has been used in the Rodgers and Hart biopic Words And Music (1948), Two Tickets To Broadway (1951), Don't Bother To Knock (1952) (sung by Anne Bancroft), Beau James (1957), Silent Movie (1976), Tempest (1982), Mighty Aphrodite (1995), The English Patient (1996), Kissing Jessica Stein (2001), Mad Men ("New Amsterdam", 2007), and many other movies and TV shows. In the film All About Eve (1950), the song is played on the piano at the party when Margo and Max are in the kitchen. In the eighth episode ("Isle of Joy", 2025) of the Disney+ show Daredevil: Born Again, "Manhattan" is performed live by Hal Leonard Big Band at Mayor Fisk's Black and White Ball.

As times progress, the song's reference to whatever long-running show is popular on Broadway changes with each cover version. The original lyrics reference Abie's Irish Rose, which ran on Broadway from 1922 to 1927. The Ella Fitzgerald rendition from 1956 mentions My Fair Lady, as does Dinah Washington's 1959 recording, while Lee Wiley and Rosemary Clooney reference South Pacific.

In the early and mid-1950s, singer Julius La Rosa became a national celebrity for his exposure on several of the shows hosted by one of the most popular television stars of the era, Arthur Godfrey. On October 19, 1953, La Rosa sang "Manhattan" on one of Godfrey's radio shows. Immediately after he finished, Godfrey fired him on the air, saying, "that was Julie's swan song with us", although the song had nothing to do with the firing. On another CBS radio program, the crime drama Broadway Is My Beat, its closing theme was a version of "Manhattan" played piano-bar style.

Crazy Otto released a version of the song on his 1958 EP Crazy Otto International, Vol. 2. as part of medley with the songs "Dungaree Doll" and "I Wonder Who's Kissing Her Now".

For many years during the 1960s and 1970s, radio station WABC (AM) used the notes from the "We'll turn Manhattan" lyric and used it as the basis for their jingles. The jingles were changed (specifically, the second note) around 1976 so that WABC would no longer be required to pay royalties for use of the melody.

== Notable recordings ==
- Lee Wiley recorded the song in December 1950 for her album Night in Manhattan
- Harry James recorded a version in 1952 on the album Soft Lights, Sweet Trumpet (Columbia CL 6207).
- Bing Crosby recorded the song in 1956 for use on his radio show and it was subsequently included in the box set The Bing Crosby CBS Radio Recordings (1954-56) issued by Mosaic Records (catalog MD7-245) in 2009.
- Ella Fitzgerald included this on the Verve 1956 release Ella Fitzgerald Sings the Rodgers and Hart Songbook
- Blossom Dearie recorded the song for her 1959 album Once Upon A Summertime
- Dinah Washington recorded the song for her 1959 album What a Diff'rence a Day Makes!
- Mel Torme recorded the song for his 1963 album Mel Tormé Sings Sunday in New York & Other Songs About New York
- Jan & Dean recorded the song for their 1963 album Surf City And Other Swinging Cities
- The Supremes recorded the song for their 1967 album The Supremes Sing Rodgers & Hart, it was not included in the original album but as an outtake.
- Tony Bennett recorded a version in 1976 on the album Tony Bennett Sings 10 Rodgers & Hart Songs and another in his 1998 album As Time Goes By
- Rod Stewart and Bette Midler – Stardust: The Great American Songbook Volume III (2004)
- Caetano Veloso recorded the song for his 2004 album of covers, A Foreign Sound
- Laura Anglade included the song in her album Get Out of Town, though did not originally plan to; it subsequently reached over a million streams on Spotify by February 2026

== Popular culture ==
- Mickey Rooney performed the song in the 1948 film Words and Music.
- Tony Martin performed the song in the 1951 film Two Tickets to Broadway.
- Vivian Blaine sang the song in "It's Sunny Again," an unsold television pilot broadcast as an episode of the ABC anthology series G.E. Summer Originals on July 3, 1956.
- Ella Fitzgerald's recording of the song serves as the closing song of "New Amsterdam," the fourth episode of the first season of Mad Men (2007), an episode in which a central plot involves a character's desire to buy an apartment in Manhattan.
- The Jan and Dean version was used in Season 1 of Only Murders in the Building in 2021.
- Stan Freberg uses the line "You'll have Manhattan, the Bronx, and Staten Island too" as the setup for a joke about paying royalties, in "The Sale of Manhattan" on his 1961 album "Stan Freberg Presents The United States of America, Volume 1."
