= My Gentleman Friend =

Studio album by Blossom Dearie
- Released: 1961
- Recorded: May 21–22, 1959
- Genre: Jazz
- Label: Verve
- Producer: Norman Granz, Blossom Dearie

Blossom Dearie chronology
Blossom Dearie Sings Comden and Green (1960)	My Gentleman Friend (1961)	Soubrette Sings Broadway Hit Songs (1960)

Professional ratings
Review scores
Source	Rating
Allmusic	3/5 stars
The Penguin Guide to Jazz Recordings	3.5/4 stars

My Gentleman Friend is a 1961 album by Blossom Dearie.

== Track listing ==
1. "Little Jazz Bird" (George Gershwin, Ira Gershwin) – 3:43
2. "Gentleman Friend" (Arnold B. Horwitt, Richard Lewine) – 3:49
3. "It's Too Good to Talk About Now" (Cy Coleman, Carolyn Leigh) – 3:09
4. "Chez moi" (Jean Féline, Paul Misraki, Bruce Sievier) – 3:09
5. "You Fascinate Me So" (Coleman, Leigh) – 3:33
6. "You've Got Something I Want" (Bob Haymes) – 2:37
7. "Boum!" (E. Ray Goetz, Charles Trenet) – 2:10
8. "L'étang" (Paul Misraki) – 2:27
9. "Hello Love" (Michael Preston Barr, Dion McGregor) – 2:51
10. "Someone to Watch Over Me" (George Gershwin, Ira Gershwin) – 5:57

== Personnel ==
- Blossom Dearie – vocals (all tracks), piano (all tracks except "You've Got Something I Want")
- Kenny Burrell – guitar (all tracks)
- Ray Brown – double bass (all tracks)
- Ed Thigpen – drums (all tracks)
- Bobby Jaspar – flute (on "Chez Moi", "Boum", "L'etang")
