= Makers of Melody =

1929 film

Makers of Melody (1929)

Makers of Melody is a short film subject from 1929 that showcased the hit song Manhattan. Manhattan was Rodgers and Hart's first hit song. The song was sung by Ruth Tester and Allan Gould.
