= Down with Love (song) =

1937 song by Harold Arlen and E.Y. Harburg;

"Down with Love" is a popular song with lyrics by E.Y. Harburg and music by Harold Arlen. It was originally written in 1937 for Kay Thompson, but introduced by her replacement, Vivian Vance, who sang it with Jack Whiting and June Clyde in the Broadway musical Hooray for What!. The song was recorded in 1940 by Eddie Condon's Orchestra with vocals by Lee Wiley. The song has been performed by Judy Garland, and Bobby Darin among others, among others, and has become a pop and jazz standard. Blossom Dearie recorded the song for her 1959 album Once Upon A Summertime Barbra Streisand recorded "Down with Love" in 1963 for The Second Barbra Streisand Album, and performed the song live on The Judy Garland Show. Garland's rendition was featured in the 2003 movie Down with Love, with an additional version by Michael Bublé and Holly Palmer.
