= Boum! =

1938 song by Charles Trenet

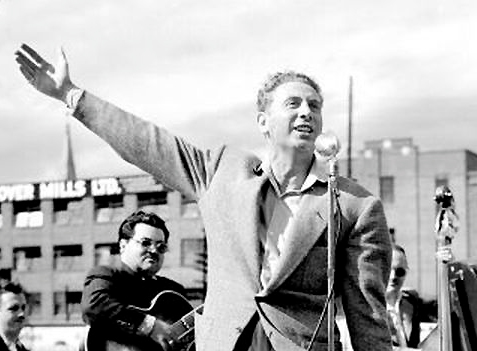
Charles Trenet, the song's author, pictured in 1946

"Boum!" (French: [bum]; onomatopoeia similar to boom in English, but referring to a heartbeat) is a popular 1938 song by the French singer/songwriter Charles Trenet which won him the Grand Prix du Disque. It was one of several songs that Trenet wrote for the film La Route enchantée, for which he also wrote the screenplay and played the leading role. The film was directed by Pierre Caron, and was released in November 1938. The song was initially released in 1938 by Columbia Records on a 10" single as the B-side to "Vous êtes jolie".

Its light, irreverent lyrics express a joie de vivre typical in French popular music produced during the late 1930s, reflecting the political unrest and economic uncertainty of that time.

It includes depictions of the sounds made by various animals and also various onomatopoeia. The lyric to the refrain is:

| Boum! | Boom! |
| Quand notre coeur fait Boum! | When our heart goes "Boom!" |
| Tout avec lui dit Boum! | Everything goes "Boom!" with it, |
| Et c'est l'amour | And it is love |
| Qui s'éveille. | Which awakes. |

"Boum!" has been recorded by other artists and in English translation. In 1994 the song was covered by Belgian singer Maurane.

The song has featured in a variety of films and documentaries, including The World at War, Something's Gotta Give, Toto the Hero, Skyfall, and A Good Year. In the BBC TV-series 'Allo 'Allo!, Edith Artois often sings it, saying that it is one of her favourites. It has also been used in commercial advertising.

== Other recordings ==
- Andy Williams released a version on his 1960 album, Under Paris Skies.
- Blossom Dearie released a version on her 1961 album, My Gentleman Friend.

== Parody ==
In Hergé's The Adventures of Tintin comic Land of Black Gold, Trenet's "Boum!" is transformed into a radio advertising jingle for a fictional roadside assistance company, "Simoun" ("Autocart" in the English editions). In the animated film Mortadelo and Filemon: Mission Implausible, Jimmy el Cachondo sings it with an alternative lyric in Spanish.
