= Charade (soundtrack) =

Charade: Music from the Motion Picture Score Composed and Conducted by Henry Mancini

Soundtrack album by Henry Mancini
- Released: 1963
- Studio: RCA (Hollywood, California)
- Genre: Soundtrack
- Length: 28:58
- Label: RCA Victor
- Producer: Joe Reisman

Charade: Music from the Motion Picture Score Composed and Conducted by Henry Mancini is a soundtrack album from the 1963 movie Charade starring Cary Grant and Audrey Hepburn. The music was composed and conducted by Henry Mancini. It entered Billboard magazine's pop album chart on February 1, 1964, peaked at No. 6, and remained on the chart for 18 weeks. AllMusic gave the album a rating of four-and-a-half stars. Reviewer Stephen Cook called it "an easy listening tour of continental musical history" and "a great Mancini recording."

The title song, "Charade" was released as a single. It reached No. 15 on the adult contemporary chart and No. 36 on the Billboard Hot 100.

== Track listing ==
=== Original 1963 release ===
Side A
No.	Title	Writer(s)	Length
1.	"Charade (Main Title)"	Henry Mancini	2:11
2.	"Bistro"	Henry Mancini	1:51
3.	"Bateau Mouche"	Henry Mancini	2:55
4.	"Megeve"	Henry Mancini	3:00
5.	"Bye Bye Charlie"	Henry Mancini	3:10
6.	"The Happy Carousel"	Henry Mancini	1:34

Side B
No.	Title	Writer(s)	Length
1.	"Charade (Vocal)"	Henry Mancini & Johnny Mercer	2:39
2.	"Orange Tamoure"	Henry Mancini	1:55
3.	"Latin Snowfall"	Henry Mancini	2:36
4.	"The Drip-Dry Waltz"	Henry Mancini	1:53
5.	"Mambo Parisienne"	Henry Mancini	2:36
6.	"Punch and Judy"	Henry Mancini	1:54
7.	"Charade (Carousel)"	Henry Mancini	1:38

=== 2012 Intrada reissue ===
In 2012, Intrada Records released the complete score as heard in the film (the previous soundtrack album was a re-recording).

No.	Title	Length
1.	"Charade Logo"	0:25
2.	"Main Title"	2:25
3.	"Mégève"	3:14
4.	"Latin Snowfall"	2:13
5.	"Positive Identification"	2:09
6.	"Empty Room"	2:35
7.	"Bye Bye Charlie"	3:49
8.	"Punch And Judy"	2:00
9.	"Mambo Parisienne"	2:15
10.	"Orange Tamouré"	1:30
11.	"Mean Cat"	2:42
12.	"Confide In Me"	3:35
13.	"Don't Trust Him"	3:35
14.	"Bistro"	3:24
15.	"Street (Bistro #2)"	2:07
16.	"Hook Fight"	5:26
17.	"Fatherly Talk"	1:48
18.	"Poor Dead Herman"	2:33
19.	"Notre Dame and Drip-Dry Waltz"	4:33
20.	"Bateau Mouche"	3:02
21.	"Charade"	2:09
22.	"Gideon Goes Down"	1:21
23.	"Carousel Medley"	5:17
24.	"Stamps"	1:17
25.	"Metro Chase"	2:25
26.	"Son Of Metro Chase"	3:04
27.	"Game Over"	1:37
28.	"True Identity and Finale"	3:54
