= Charade (1963 song) =

Single by Henry Mancini

from the album Charade
- B-side: "Orange Tamoure"
- Released: December 1963
- Genre: Jazz
- Length: 2:38
- Label: RCA Victor 1383
- Songwriters: Henry Mancini, Johnny Mercer

Henry Mancini singles chronology
"Banzai Pipeline" (1963)	"Charade" (1963)	"The Pink Panther Theme" (1964)

"Charade" is a Parisian waltz with music by Henry Mancini and lyrics by Johnny Mercer performed in the 1963 film of the same name starring Cary Grant and Audrey Hepburn. It was nominated that year for the Academy Award for Best Original Song.

== Inspiration ==
Stanley Donen had heard and been charmed by Henry Mancini's song "Baby Elephant Walk" from the film Hatari!, Henry Mancini had become a friend of Audrey Hepburn while scoring Breakfast at Tiffany's, and he composed the song for Charade: "Our next film together was Charade in 1963. Stanley Donen directed Peter Stone's screenplay. There is a scene in the movie where Audrey returns from a happy winter holiday to her Paris flat to find it stripped of everything of value. Bare floors and the walls are all that remain. Her loutish husband had absconded with all of her worldly goods. She enters the dimly-lit apartment with her suitcase and surveys the scene. Her feelings are of sadness, loneliness and vulnerability. To me, it translated into a sad little Parisian waltz. With that image of Audrey in my mind, I went to the piano and within less than an hour 'Charade' was written. I played it for Audrey and Stanley. Both felt it was just right for the movie. Johnny Mercer added his poetry, and the song was nominated for an Oscar that year".

== Recordings ==
Henry Mancini's version reached No.15 on the adult contemporary chart and No.36 on the Billboard Hot 100 in 1963. Andy Williams released a version that reached #No.100 on the Billboard Hot 100 in 1964. Sammy Kaye also released a version in 1964 that reached No.10 on the adult contemporary chart and No.36 on the Billboard Hot 100. Blossom Dearie's version is found on her album "May I Come In". It was used for the closing credits for the film Can You Ever Forgive Me?. Dame Shirley Bassey recorded the song for EMI which was released in 1968 on the LP entitled " 12 of those songs. "

== Reactions ==
As with "Moon River" and "The Days of Wine and Roses," the song is subjugated, at various places in the film, to the role of source music. Though the Mancini-Mercer team lost the Oscar that year, Johnny Mercer said it was his favourite Mancini melody. Donen was impressed with Mancini as a working partner: "just a lovely man to work with" and "elegant, meticulous, very organized".

== In popular culture ==
The song was prominently featured in the 1976 Columbo fifth-season episode "Now You See Him..." It is sung twice onscreen by a cabaret singer (portrayed by Patrick Culliton) and later plays in an instrumental version over the episode's closing credits.

The 1965 Bollywood film Gumnaam has a recurring song that appropriates the melody of “Charade,” taunting the characters as they are killed one by one.

== Composition ==
Charade is a waltz written in minor chord in the standard form AABA without introduction with the main part (or A part) repeated three times. In the second A part the song is arranged with a chromatic harmony that recalls James Bond's theme.
