= Down with Love =

2003 film by Peyton Reed

- Theatrical release poster
- Directed by: Peyton Reed
- Written by: Eve Ahlert; Dennis Drake
- Produced by: Dan Jinks; Bruce Cohen
- Starring: Renée Zellweger; Ewan McGregor; David Hyde Pierce; Sarah Paulson; Tony Randall
- Cinematography: Jeff Cronenweth
- Edited by: Larry Bock
- Music by: Marc Shaiman
- Production companies: Fox 2000 Pictures; Regency Enterprises; Jinks/Cohen Company
- Distributed by: 20th Century Fox
- Release dates: May 9, 2003 (New York City); May 16, 2003 (United States); December 25, 2003 (Germany)
- Running time: 102 minutes
- Countries: United States; Germany
- Language: English
- Budget: $35 million
- Box office: $39.5 million

Down with Love is a 2003 romantic comedy film directed by Peyton Reed. It stars Renée Zellweger and Ewan McGregor and is a pastiche of the early-1960s American "no-sex sex comedies", such as Pillow Talk and Lover Come Back (both starring Rock Hudson, Doris Day, and Tony Randall) and the "myriad spawn" of derivative films that followed. Time film critic Richard Corliss wrote that Down with Love "is so clogged with specific references to a half-dozen Rock-and-Doris-type comedies that it serves as definitive distillation of the genre."

Randall himself plays a small role in Down with Love, "bestowing his sly, patriarchal blessing" on the film, which also stars David Hyde Pierce (in the neurotic-best-friend role often played by Randall or Gig Young), Sarah Paulson, Rachel Dratch, Jeri Ryan, and Jack Plotnick, who spoofs the kind of role Chet Stratton played in Lover Come Back.

Typical of the genre, the film tells the story of a woman who advocates female independence in combat with a lothario. The plot reflects the attitudes and behaviour of the early pre-sexual revolution 1960s, but has an anachronistic conclusion driven by more modern, post-feminist ideas and attitudes. It is the final film starring Tony Randall to be released before his death in 2004.

Although the film received a mixed critical response at the time of release and underperformed at the box office, it has since undergone a critical reappraisal and grown a cult following for its subversion of rom-com conventions.

== Plot ==
In 1962, aspiring author Barbara Novak arrives in New York to promote her book, Down with Love, to Banner House publishing. It is about freeing women from love, enjoying sex without commitment, and replacing the need for a man with things such as chocolate. Barbara believes that her rules will help boost women in the workplace and the world in general.

When Banner House's male executives do not appreciate the book, Barbara's editor Vikki Hiller suggests Barbara meet with Catcher Block—a successful writer for Know magazine—to help promote it. However, he repeatedly avoids meeting her until, fed up, she insults him. Catcher's boss and best friend Peter MacMannus and Vikki develop a mutual attraction, but neither is brave enough to express their feelings. Peter feels overshadowed by Catcher's strong personality, and Vikki wants to see strength in her lover, so assumes he must be gay.

Barbara and Vikki persuade Judy Garland to sing "Down with Love" on The Ed Sullivan Show to promote the book. Sales skyrocket, as women around the world rebel against their men; Catcher now wants to meet Barbara but she rejects him. The breaking point comes as she appears on a national TV show and discusses a chapter from her book—"The Worst Kind of Man"—and cites Catcher Block as the perfect example, causing the women he dates to reject him.

Catcher schemes to prove that Barbara really wants love and marriage like every other woman. He poses as Major Zip Martin, an attentive astronaut with a Southern accent. She becomes infatuated with a man who seems unaware of her celebrity, in contrast to the men who now avoid her since her book was published. As "Zip" takes Barbara to fashionable New York locations, he maintains sexual tension by feigning naiveté and a desire to remain chaste until he is "ready" for a physical relationship. Zip's plan becomes complicated after he starts falling for her.

When Barbara encounters Catcher/Zip at a party, which nearly exposes his true identity, he decides to take things to the next level. He says that Catcher Block wants to interview him for an exposé on the NASA space program and asks her to be there. At his apartment, he sets everything up to record Barbara saying that she loves him. As they are about to have sex, one of his lovers, Gwendolyn, walks in. Not knowing who Barbara is, she exposes Catcher's identity, forcing him to confess who he is.

Barbara then reveals that she is actually Nancy Brown, one of Catcher's many former secretaries, who had fallen in love with him while working at Know. She had turned down a date with him, refusing to be another fling. Barbara wanted to be different from the other women he knew, and make him fall in love with her. Catcher proclaims that he wants to marry her, but Gwendolyn, having overheard Barbara Novak's name, thanks her for what she has done for womankind.

Barbara realizes that she does not want love or Catcher, as she has become a real "down with love" girl. Vikki and Peter's relationship also changes when she insults him for helping Catcher. Peter says that he is like any other man, and takes Vikki to Catcher's apartment to have sex with her.

Days later, Catcher is depressed as he has failed to win back Barbara. Even his exposé, which he wrote on how falling in love with her made him a better man, is ruined now that she has told her story in her own magazine, Now. Catcher goes to Now on the pretense of a job interview. He tells Barbara how much she has changed him and wishes there could be a middle ground for them, somewhere between her confident blonde persona and her original brunette self.

After Catcher leaves her office, Barbara surprises him on the elevator, showing him a bright-red hair style. She has found the middle ground and wants to be with him. They elope to Las Vegas, inspiring Vikki and Peter to also get married. Barbara and Catcher's marriage results in a new book aimed at ending the battle of the sexes.

== Cast ==
- Renée Zellweger as Barbara Novak
- Ewan McGregor as Catcher Block
- David Hyde Pierce as Peter MacMannus
- Sarah Paulson as Vikki Hiller
- Tony Randall as Theodore Banner
- Jeri Ryan as Gwendolyn
- Ivana Miličević as Yvette
- Melissa George as Elkie
- Rachel Dratch as Gladys
- Florence Stanley as Dry Cleaner's Wife
- Chris Parnell as TV Emcee
- John Aylward as E.G.
- Jude Ciccolella as Private Eye
- Robert Katims as Dry Cleaner
- Jack Plotnick as Maurice
- Warren Munson as C.B.
- Matt Ross as J.B.
- Michael Ensign as J.R.
- Timothy Omundson as R.J.
- Dorie Barton as Sally

== Style ==
The sets, costumes, cinematography, editing, score, opening credits, and visual effects (including split-screen shots during phone calls heavily laced with double entendres between the two leads), echo the style of Hollywood sex comedies from 1959 to 1964 (from Pillow Talk to Sex and the Single Girl). The New York City skyline of 1962 was digitally recreated for backdrops. A greenscreen technique was used to simulate unconvincing 1960s rear projection using restored street footage from the late 1950s and early 1960s. In accordance with the film's style, the 1950s 20th Century Fox logo with the CinemaScope logo, a wide-screen process introduced in the 1950s, developed and owned by 20th Century Fox, was utilized with the addition of the byline for News Corporation and the 1998 version of the fanfare, composed by Alfred Newman. The Regency Enterprises logo is in pink, and contains a saxophone jazz rendition of its theme.

== Reception ==
=== Box office ===
Down with Love was chosen as "the perfect film" to open the second Tribeca Film Festival, where it made its premiere. The film opened first in New York, and was released countrywide a week later on May 16, 2003. The film was released as counter programming against The Matrix Reloaded. Though the film was highly anticipated, it performed far below box office expectations in comparison with other rom-coms released in the same year, such as How to Lose a Guy in 10 Days and Something's Gotta Give, both of which grossed over $100 million. Down with Love ultimately made just $39.5 million worldwide on a $35 million budget.

=== Critical response ===
At the time of its release, Down With Love received extremely varying reviews. Chicago Sun-Times critic Roger Ebert spoke of the film fairly positively, saying parts were "fun" and describing Zellweger's speech at the end as "a torrent of words [pouring] out from her character's innermost soul". A. O. Scott in The New York Times praised director "Reed's buoyant homage", Zellweger's Doris Day-like ability to "swivel engagingly between goofiness and sex appeal", McGregor's Sinatra-like "wiry, wolfish energy" and screenwriters Ahlert's and Drake's "canny cocktail of period vernacular and deliberately labored double entendres", finding the movie "intelligent and amusing" with "a glorious, hectic artificiality". But he questioned "the point of the exercise" compared with Todd Haynes' Far from Heaven, which "plunged into the subtext of those old movies", whereas Down with Love, being an "updating and a critique", "snips that subtext away", making it "less sophisticated than what it imitates".

Conversely, The San Francisco Chronicle's Mick LaSalle wrote, "Down With Love is superior to Far From Heaven", which "seems naive in comparison" because "Down with Love is a very smart, very shrewd movie, and the smartest, shrewdest thing about it is the way it masquerades as just a fluffy comedy, a diversion, a trifle. Hardly a trifle, Down With Love distills 40 years of sexual politics into 100 minutes, using the romantic-comedy conventions of an earlier time to comment on the governing social assumptions of yesterday—and today, as well... The brilliance of Down With Love is that it slyly reminds us that our modern perspective, like every 'modern perspective' that preceded it, is doomed to obsolescence and isn't some final stage of enlightened social thought."

Opposing opinions occurred even at the same newspaper, as with The New York Observer, where Rex Reed's review was headlined "Down With Down With Love!" but Andrew Sarris's headline countered with "It's Affectionate and Smart, And I'm Down With Love".

Richard Corliss of Time admired Orlandi's costumes and Laws' design for their "giddily precise exaggeration" and wrote that the script "has a gentle heart to humanize its sharp sitcom wit," advising his readers to "stay for the movie's denouement: a two-minute speech that wraps up the plot like Christmas ribbons around a time bomb". But he found the film to be "miscast at the top" and "conflicted about its subject—it both derides and adores what it means to parody" and that director "Reed often uses a gong where chimes would do." Corliss concludes: "As you see, we too are conflicted about this film. We want to love it, but like a Rock Hudson rake, we keep finding fault in its allure. We want to hate it, but like Doris Day, we finally can't say no".

In the years after its release, Nathan Rabin, Jonathan Rosenbaum, and Richard Brody have been among the critics and film theorists that have continued to write in praise of the film. Rabin wrote that Chicago critics by and large embraced Down With Love, noting: "It got two thumbs up from Ebert & Roeper and was No. 2 on Rosenbaum’s Top 10 list in the Chicago Reader." Rosenbaum called it a "masterpiece" and wrote, "If a more interesting and entertaining Hollywood movie than Down with Love has come along this year, I've missed it".

Down with Love holds a 60% approval rating at review aggregator website Rotten Tomatoes, based on reviews from 179 critics, with an average rating of 6.10/10. The site's consensus states: "Looks great, but Zellweger and McGregor have no chemistry together, and the self-satisfied, knowing tone grates". On Metacritic, the film has a score of 52 out of 100 based on 39 critics' reviews, indicating "mixed or average" reviews. Audiences polled by CinemaScore gave the film an average grade of "C+" on an A+ to F scale.

In August 2018, Vanity Fair put Down With Love at Number 13 on their list of the top "25 Best Romantic Comedies of All Time". In June 2017, Jonathan Rosenbaum named Down With Love one of his "25 Favorite Films of the 21st Century (so far)". In 2023, Beatrice Loayza of The New York Times wrote of the film’s cult following, saying "its meta-referential charms" have been embraced by a "younger generation…that better understands the role-playing nature of gender and romantic courtship…The film mocks, but it also transports with its eye-candy visuals and coy performances, reminding us that a suspension of reason is required to perform gender, to be sucked into a rom-com and, even, to fall in love."

== Music ==
The film's title comes from the song "Down with Love" as sung by Judy Garland, who is seen singing it on The Ed Sullivan Show in one scene.

The song "Here's to Love" sung by Zellweger and McGregor during the closing credits (and in its entirety on the DVD release as a special feature) was a last-minute addition to the film. Songwriters Marc Shaiman and Scott Wittman appear in the number as the bartender and the pianist. According to the DVD commentary, it was added at the suggestion of McGregor, who pointed out the opportunity the filmmakers had to unite the stars of two recently popular musical films (his Moulin Rouge! and Zellweger's Chicago).

The songs "Kissing a Fool" and "For Once in My Life", sung by Michael Bublé, previously appeared on Bublé's 2003 self-titled album.

== Track listing ==
No.	Title	Writer(s)	Performer(s)	Length
1.	"Down with Love"	Edgar Yipsel Harburg; Harold Arlen	Michael Bublé and Holly Palmer	2:31
2.	"Barbara Arrives"	Marc Shaiman	Marc Shaiman	2:08
3.	"Fly Me to the Moon (In Other Words)"	Bart Howard	Frank Sinatra and Count Basie and His Orchestra	2:30
4.	"One Mint Julep"	Rudy Toombs	Xavier Cugat and His Orchestra	3:06
5.	"For Once in My Life"	Ron Miller; Orlando Murden	Michael Bublé	2:33
6.	"Girls Night Out"	Marc Shaiman	Marc Shaiman	1:00
7.	"Everyday Is a Holiday (With You)"	Jenny-Bea Englishman; Sean Lennon	Esthero	2:59
8.	"Kissing a Fool"	George Michael	Michael Bublé	4:35
9.	"Barbara Meets Zip"	Marc Shaiman	Marc Shaiman	4:08
10.	"Fly Me to the Moon (In Other Words)"	Bart Howard	Astrud Gilberto	2:20
11.	"Love in Three Acts"	Marc Shaiman	Marc Shaiman	6:52
12.	"Here's to Love"	Marc Shaiman; Scott Wittman	Renée Zellweger and Ewan McGregor	3:10
Total length:				37:52
