= The Garrick Gaieties =

1925 Rodgers and Hart musical

Garrick Gaieties
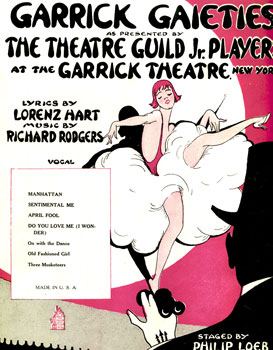
- Sheet Music
- Music: Richard Rodgers
- Lyrics: Lorenz Hart
- Productions: 1925 Broadway

Garrick Gaieties is a revue with music by Richard Rodgers and lyrics by Lorenz Hart, the first successful musical by this songwriting team.

It debuted in 1925 on Broadway and was the first of three Garrick Gaiety revues, which were subsequently produced in 1926 and 1930. The show parodied current subjects, such as the New York City Subway system and the Theatre Guild (producer of the show). The Garrick Gaieties is remembered as "bringing Rodgers and Hart their first major recognition." Their hit song "Manhattan" was introduced in this revue.

== Productions and history ==
The revue first opened on Broadway at the Garrick Theatre on May 17, 1925, as a 2-performance benefit for the Theatre Guild. The reviews were favorable, and Rodgers and others persuaded the Theatre Guild to continue the production, which re-opened on June 8, 1925 and ran until November 28, for 211 performances. Several writers contributed the material for the sketches, including Edith Meiser, Sam Jaffe, Benjamin Kaye, Morrie Ryskind and Howard J. Green.

Directed by Philip Loeb with musical staging by Herbert Fields, the cast included Alvah Bessie, Romney Brent, June Cochrane, Sterling Holloway, Libby Holman, Philip Loeb, Edith Meiser, Sanford Meisner, Betty Starbuck and Lee Strasberg.

=== Subsequent productions ===
There were two sequels, also titled Garrick Gaieties. They were produced on Broadway by the Theatre Guild with direction by Philip Loeb at the Guild Theatre, and opened, respectively, on May 10, 1926, June 4, 1930, and, in a return engagement for 10 performances, October 16, 1930. Sterling Holloway appeared in all of the sequels, and Edith Meiser appeared in all but the final one. Notable performers included Imogene Coca and Rosalind Russell. Ruth Tester sang, "Sing Something Simple". The costumes for the 1930 production were designed by Kate Drain Lawson and Louis M. Simon, and were made by Helene Pons Studio.

The music and lyrics for the 1926 Gaieties were written by Rodgers and Hart and introduced their famous song "Mountain Greenery". The music and lyrics for the 1930 version were written by many, including Marc Blitzstein, Vernon Duke, Ira Gershwin, E. Y. Harburg, and Johnny Mercer. (Note: Duke, Gershwin, and Harburg had contributed the song "I Am Only Human After All," which Duke said "became [his] passport to Broadway."Duke, Vernon (1955). Passport to Paris. Little, Brown and Company. pp. 223 and 242 (quotation).)

== Sketches and musical numbers ==
The opening number, "Soliciting Subscriptions" was a spoof of the Theatre Guild's "serious pretensions", along with the following song, "Gilding the Guild". Ryskind wrote skits including a satire of President and Mrs. Calvin Coolidge, and a parody of the Scopes Trial, which was dropped from the show after William Jennings Bryan died on July 25, 1925. Libby Holman's solo, "Black and White" was later dropped. Sterling Holloway and June Cochrane introduced the song "Manhattan", as its "easygoing strolling melody and ingeniously rhymed lyric related all of the everyday pleasures to be found in New York". The "wittily unsentimental" "Sentimental Me" was praised by the critics and was a hit money-maker as well.

== Songs ==
Note: music by Rodgers and lyrics by Hart except as noted.

Act 1

- Soliciting Subscriptions
- Gilding the Guild
- Butcher, Baker, Candle-Stick Maker (Lyrics by Benjamin M. Kaye, Music by Mana Zucca)
- An Old-Fashioned Girl (Lyrics by Edith Meiser)
- April Fool
- Stage Managers' Chorus (Lyrics by Hart and Dudley Digges)
- The Joy Spreader

Act 2

- Rancho Mexicano (Music by Tatanacho)
- Ladies of the Box Office
- Mr. and Mrs.
- Manhattan
- The Three Musketeers
- Do You Love Me (I Wonder)?
- Black and White

- "Sentimental Me (And Poor Romantic You)" was also in the revue although not listed in the Internet Broadway Database.
