= Tweedledum & Tweedledee (Two People Who Resemble Each Other, in this Case Musically) =

Studio album by Blossom Dearie, Mike Renzi
- Released: 1991
- Genre: Jazz, cool jazz
- Label: Daffodil

Blossom Dearie, Mike Renzi chronology
Songs of Chelsea (1988)	Tweedledum & Tweedledee (Two People Who Resemble Each Other, in this Case Musically) (1991)

Professional ratings
Review scores
Source	Rating
The Penguin Guide to Jazz Recordings	2.5/4 stars

Tweedledum & Tweedledee (Two People Who Resemble Each Other, in this Case Musically) is a 1991 (see 1991 in music) studio album by Blossom Dearie and Mike Renzi.

== Track listing ==
1. "I Don't Remember" (Blossom Dearie, Jack Segal)
2. "Ev'rybody Loves Jobim" (Louis Adlebert, Louis Aldebert, Monique Aldebert)
3. "I Thought I Heard a Hummingbird" (Blossom Dearie, Jack Segal)
4. "The Quiet Time" (Duncan Lamont)
5. "My Love Went to London" (Tony Scibetta, John Wallowitch)
6. "I Did It All for You" (Duncan Lamont)
7. "Not You Again" (Duncan Lamont)
8. "Blossom" (John Densem)
9. "Love is On the Way" (Blossom Dearie, Jack Segal)
10. "Fred Astaire" (Duncan Lamont)
11. "A Nightingale Sang in Berkeley Square" (Eric Maschwitz, Manning Sherwin)

== Personnel ==
- Blossom Dearie – piano, vocals
- Mike Renzi
