= Simply (Blossom Dearie album) =

Studio album by Blossom Dearie
- Released: 1982
- Genre: Jazz, vocal jazz
- Label: Daffodil

Blossom Dearie chronology
Needlepoint Magic Vol. 5 (1979)	Simply (1982)	Et Tu Bruce? (1984)

Simply is an album by jazz singer Blossom Dearie that was released in 1982 on her label, Daffodil Records. Musicians on the album include Bob Dorough, Jay Berliner and Grady Tate.

== Track listing ==
Side A

1. "I Never Say Goodbye" (Jack Segal – Blossom Dearie)
2. "I Know My Lines" (Jack Segal – Blossom Dearie)
3. "Sweet Kentucky Ham" (David Frishberg)
4. "Bobby and Me" (Jack Segal – Blossom Dearie)
5. "Answering Machine" (Rupert Holmes)

Side B

1. "Bye-Bye Country Boy" (Jack Segal – Blossom Dearie)
2. "I Told You So" (Duncan Lamont)
3. "I Have the Feeling I've Been Here Before" (Alan and Marilyn Bergman – Roger Kellaway)
4. "Just the Way You Are" (Billy Joel)
5. "Bring All Your Love Along" (Jack Segal – Blossom Dearie)

== Personnel ==
- Blossom Dearie – piano, vocals
- Bob Dorough – vocals
- Mike Renzi – keyboards
- Jay Berliner – guitar
- Jay Leonhart – bass
- Grady Tate – drums
