= Sweet Blossom Dearie =

Live album by Blossom Dearie
- Released: 1967
- Venue: Ronnie Scott's Jazz Club, Soho, London
- Genre: Jazz
- Label: Fontana

Blossom Dearie chronology
Blossom Time at Ronnie Scott's (1966)	Sweet Blossom Dearie (1967)	Soon It's Gonna Rain (1967)

Sweet Blossom Dearie is a 1967 live album by Blossom Dearie.

It is the second album Dearie recorded at Ronnie Scott's Jazz Club, and is subsequently her second live album to be released.

== Track listing ==
1. "Let's Go Where the Grass is Greener" (Howlett Smith)
2. "You Turn Me On Baby" (Cy Coleman)
3. "A Sleepin' Bee" (Harold Arlen, Truman Capote)
4. "Sweet Lover No More" (Dave Frishberg)
5. "Sweet Georgie Fame" (Blossom Dearie, Sandra Harris)
6. "That's No Joke" (Joe Bailey)
7. "Peel Me a Grape" (Dave Frishberg)
8. "One Note Samba" (Antônio Carlos Jobim, Newton Mendonça, Jon Hendricks)
9. "On a Clear Day (You Can See Forever)" (Burton Lane, Alan Jay Lerner)
10. "I'll Only Miss Him When I Think of Him" (Sammy Cahn, Jimmy Van Heusen)
11. "Big City's for Me" (Marvin Jenkins)
12. "You're Gonna Hear from Me" (Dory Previn, André Previn)

== Personnel ==
- Blossom Dearie - piano, vocals
- Freddie Logan - bass
- Allan Ganley - drums
