= Chez Wahlberg: Part One =

Studio album by Blossom Dearie
- Released: 1985
- Recorded: 1985
- Genre: Jazz
- Label: Daffodil Records

Blossom Dearie chronology
Et Tu Bruce (1983)	Chez Wahlberg: Part One (1985)	Songs of Chelsea (1987)

Chez Wahlberg: Part One is a 1985 album by Blossom Dearie.

Although the album is titled as part one, a second part was never released.

== Track listing ==
=== Side one ===
1. "Only Yesterday" (W. Roy)
2. "Sad Song Lady" (D. Shipman, R. Webb)
3. "Are You Still in Love with Emily?" (J. Wallowitch)
4. "Good morning Darling (What's Your Name)" (J. Segal, J. Wilson)
5. "You Must Believe in Spring" (Alan Bergman, Marilyn Bergman, Jacques Demy, Michel Legrand)
6. "Round About" (O. Nash, V. Duke)
7. "Love Dance" (with Mark Murphy) (P. Williams, L. Lins, V. Martins)
8. "We Talked about Charlie" (M. Aldebert, L. Aldebert)

=== Side two ===
1. "A Small Love Song" (?)
2. "Both of Us" (?)
3. "A Friend Like You" (?) (?)
4. "I Wish It Wasn't Spring" (?)
5. "In Your Eyes" (?)
6. "The One Who Loves the Most" (Blossom Dearie, Jack Segal)
7. "Old Thyme Movie Love Affair" (?)
8. "Just Being Here" (?)

== Personnel ==
- Blossom Dearie – vocal, piano
