= Songs of Chelsea =

Studio album by Blossom Dearie
- Released: 1988
- Genre: Jazz, cool jazz
- Label: Daffodil

Blossom Dearie chronology
Chez Wahlberg: Part One (1985)	Songs of Chelsea (1988)	Tweedledum & Tweedledee (Two People Who Resemble Each Other, in this Case Musically) (1991)

Professional ratings
Review scores
Source	Rating
AllMusic	3/5 stars

Songs of Chelsea is a 1988 studio album by Blossom Dearie.

== Track listing ==
1. "My Attorney Bernie" (Dave Frishberg)
2. "Ev'rything I've Got" (music: Richard Rodgers; lyrics: Lorenz Hart)
3. "C'est le printemps" (music: Richard Rodgers; lyrics: Jean Sablon)
4. "When in Rome" (music: Cy Coleman; lyrics: Carolyn Leigh)
5. "Let the Flower Grow" (Jay Leonhart)
6. "My New Celebrity Is You" (Johnny Mercer)
7. "What Time Is It Now" (music: Blossom Dearie; lyrics: Jack Segal)
8. "You Fascinate Me So" (music: Cy Coleman; lyrics: Carolyn Leigh)
9. "Moonlight Saving Time" (Irving Kahal, Harry Richman)
10. "Chelsea Aire" (Walter Birchett, Dearie)

== Personnel ==
- Blossom Dearie – piano, vocals
- Bob Cranshaw – double bass
- Jay Berliner – guitar
