= Blossom Time at Ronnie Scott's =

Live album by Blossom Dearie
- Released: 1966
- Venue: Ronnie Scott's Jazz Club, Soho, London
- Genre: Vocal jazz
- Label: Fontana

Blossom Dearie chronology
May I Come In? (1964)	Blossom Time at Ronnie Scott's (1966)	Sweet Blossom Dearie (1967)

Professional ratings
Review scores
Source	Rating
Allmusic	4/5 stars
The Penguin Guide to Jazz Recordings	3/4 stars

Blossom Time at Ronnie Scott's is a 1966 live album by Blossom Dearie.

Recorded at Ronnie Scott's Jazz Club, this was Dearie's first live album.

== Track listing ==
1. "On Broadway" (Barry Mann, Cynthia Weil, Jerry Leiber, Mike Stoller) – 3:55
2. "(Ah, the Apple Trees) When the World Was Young" (Michel Philippe-Gérard, Angele Vannier, Johnny Mercer) – 4:20
3. "When in Rome" (Cy Coleman, Carolyn Leigh) – 4:45
4. "The Shadow of Your Smile" (Johnny Mandel, Paul Francis Webster) – 4:13
5. "Ev'rything I've Got" (Richard Rodgers, Lorenz Hart) – 4:29
6. "Once Upon a Summertime" (Eddie Barclay, Michel Legrand, Eddy Marnay, Johnny Mercer) – 3:51
7. "I'm Hip" (Dave Frishberg, Bob Dorough) – 2:48
8. "Mad About the Boy" (Noël Coward) – 5:05
9. "The Shape of Things" (Sheldon Harnick) – 2:42
10. "Satin Doll" (Duke Ellington, Johnny Mercer, Billy Strayhorn) – 5:15

== Personnel ==
- Blossom Dearie – piano, vocals
- Jeff Clyne – double bass
- Johnny Butts – drums
