= Bobby Jaspar =

Belgian jazz saxophonist, flautist and composer (1926–1963)

Background information
- Born: 20 February 1926; Liège, Belgium
- Died: 28 February 1963 (aged 37) New York City, New York, United States
- Genres: Jazz
- Occupation: Musician
- Instruments: Flute, tenor saxophone
- Years active: 1954–1963
- Label: Prestige
- Spouse: Blossom Dearie (m. 1954; div. 1957)

Bobby Jaspar (20 February 1926 – 28 February 1963) was a Belgian cool jazz and hard bop saxophonist, flautist and composer.

== Early life ==
Born in Liège, Belgium, Jaspar learned to play piano and clarinet at a young age. Later, he took up the tenor saxophone and flute.

== Career ==
With the "Bob Shots" band, he took his first steps in the jazz world. In 1950, Jaspar moved to Paris, playing and recording with the best musicians of the era. Here he met singer Blossom Dearie; the two were married in 1954, but divorced in 1957.

In 1956, Jaspar was persuaded to try his luck in the United States, where his reputation in jazz circles had preceded him. He played and recorded with the quintet of J. J. Johnson, with Kenny Burrell, Miles Davis, John Coltrane, Toshiko Akiyoshi, Donald Byrd and many others.

In 1961/1962, Jaspar returned to Europe for a year for a series of concerts and a number of recordings, and formed a successful quintet with Belgian guitarist René Thomas. In some sessions, this was expanded to a powerful sextet with American trumpeter Chet Baker. One of those sessions, recorded in 1962, was released on record as Chet Is Back!.

== Death ==
Bobby Jaspar died from a heart attack in New York City, on 28 February 1963 at age 37.

== Discography ==
=== As leader/co-leader ===
- New Sound from Belgium, Vol. 4 (Disques Vogue, 1953 [1954])
- Bobby Jaspar/Henri Renaud (BMG France, 1953–54 [2000])
- Revisited (Inner City, 1953–54 [1980])
- New Jazz, Vol. 1 (Disques Vogue/Swing, 1954)
- New Jazz, Vol. 2 (Disques Vogue/Swing, 1954 [1955])
- Bobby Jaspar and His Modern Jazz (BMG France, 1954–55 [1998])
- Bobby Jaspar and His All Stars (EmArcy, 1955 [1956]) – aka Modern jazz au club Saint Germain (Barclay, 1956) and Memory of Dick (EmArcy, 1988)
- Rencontre a Paris (Disques Vogue/Swing, 1955) – with Don Rendell
- Bobby Jaspar Quintet (Columbia, 1956 [1957])
- Clarinescapade (Fresh Sound, 1956 [2007])
- Joue pour Savoy (Savoy, 1956) – released in the US under Mort Herbert's name as Night People (Savoy, 1956)
- Flute Flight (Prestige, 1957) – with Herbie Mann
- Flute Soufflé (Prestige, 1957) – with Herbie Mann
- Interplay for 2 Trumpets and 2 Tenors (Prestige, 1957) – with Idrees Sulieman, Webster Young, John Coltrane et al.
- Tenor and Flute (Riverside, 1957) – aka Bobby Jaspar with George Wallington and Idrees Sulieman (Riverside/OJC, 1992)
- Bobby Jaspar (Barclay, 1958 [1959]) – aka Phenil Isopropil Amine (EmArcy, 1988) and Jeux de quartes (Gitanes Jazz, 2002)
- The Soul of Jazz (World Wide, 1958) – with Bill Harris, Joe Wilder, Pepper Adams and Eddie Costa
- The Spirit of Charlie Parker (World Wide, 1958) – with Frank Wess and Seldon Powell
- Bobby Jaspar with Friends … (Fresh Sound, 1958; 1960; 1962 [1991]) – with Mundell Lowe and René Thomas
- Thomas-Jaspar Quintet (RCA, 1961 [1962]) – with René Thomas
- Bobby Jaspar Quartet at Ronnie Scott's (Mole Jazz, 1962 [1986])

With Chet Baker

- Chet Baker and His Quintet with Bobby Jaspar (Barclay, 1956)
- Chet Is Back! (RCA, 1962)

With Donald Byrd

- Byrd in Paris (Brunswick, 1958)
- Parisian Thoroughfare (Brunswick, 1958)
- Cannes '58 (Sam, 1958 [2022])
- Paris '58 (Sam, 1958 [2023])

With Chris Connor

- Chris Craft (Atlantic, 1958)
- Sings Ballads of the Sad Cafe (Atlantic, 1959)

With Blossom Dearie

- Blossom Dearie Plays April in Paris (Barclay, 1955–56 [1987])
- My Gentleman Friend (Verve, 1959 [1960])

With J. J. Johnson

- Jay and Kai (Columbia, 1955–57 [1957])
- J Is for Jazz (Columbia, 1956)
- J. J. Johnson Quintet Featuring Bobby Jaspar: Complete Recordings (Fresh Sound, 1956–57 [2009])
- Dial J. J. 5 (Columbia, 1957)
- Really Livin' (Columbia, 1959)

With others

- Toshiko Akiyoshi, United Notions (MetroJazz, 1958)
- Kenny Burrell, Weaver of Dreams (Columbia, 1960–61 [1961])
- Tal Farlow, The Guitar Artistry of Tal Farlow (Verve, 1959)
- Barry Galbraith, Guitar and the Wind (Decca, 1958)
- Michel Hausser, Vibes + Flute (Columbia, 1960)
- André Hodeir, American Jazzmen Play André Hodeir (Savoy, 1957)
- Milt Jackson, Bags & Flutes (Atlantic, 1957)
- Hank Jones, Hank Jones Trio Plus the Flute of Bobby Jaspar (Savoy, 1956)
- Wynton Kelly, Kelly Blue (Riverside, 1959)
- John Lewis, A Milanese Story: Original Soundtrack (Atlantic, 1962)
- Helen Merrill, The Nearness of You (EmArcy, 1957–58 [1958])
- The Nutty Squirrels, The Nutty Squirrels (Hanover, 1959)
- John Rae, Opus de Jazz, Vol. 2 (Savoy, 1960)
- Jimmy Raney, Visits Paris (Dawn, 1954 [1958])
- Henri Renaud, Henri Renaud quintet joue Gigi Grice avec Bobby Jaspar (Disques Vogue, 1953 [1955])
