= That's Just the Way I Want to Be =

Studio album by Blossom Dearie
- Released: 1970
- Recorded: 1970
- Genre: Jazz
- Label: Fontana
- Producer: Pete King for Ronnie Scott Directions Ltd.

Blossom Dearie chronology
Soon It's Gonna Rain (1967)	That's Just the Way I Want to Be (1970)	Blossom Dearie Sings (1974)

Professional ratings
Review scores
Source	Rating
Allmusic	3/5 stars

That's Just the Way I Want to Be is a 1970 album by Blossom Dearie. For the first time, the focus is on Dearie as a songwriter with her co-writing nine of the album's 12 tracks. She took the opportunity to pay tribute to some of her contemporaries: John Lennon (the object of her praise in "Hey John"), Georgie Fame and Dusty Springfield. The last song, "I Like London In The Rain", contains an opening breakbeat that has been sampled by hip hop producers.

== Track listing ==
1. "That's Just the Way I Want to Be" – 3:48
2. "Long Daddy Green" (Blossom Dearie, Dave Frishberg) – 3:23
3. "Sweet Surprise" – 3:18
4. "Hey John" – 3:31
5. "Sweet Georgie Fame" (Dearie, Sandra Harris) – 3:24
6. "Both Sides Now" (Joni Mitchell) – 3.19
7. "Dusty Springfield" (Dearie, Jim Council, Norma Tanega) – 1.55
8. "Will There Really Be a Morning" (John Wallowitch, Emily Dickinson) – 3.07
9. "I Know the Moon" – 3:28
10. "Inside a Silent Tear" (Dearie, Peter King) – 2:16
11. "Yesterday When I Was Young" (Charles Aznavour, Herbert Kretzmer) – 5:11
12. "I Like London in the Rain" – 2:39

All songs by Blossom Dearie and Jim Council, except as indicated.

== Personnel ==
- Blossom Dearie – piano, vocals
- Ian Carr – flugelhorn
- Jeff Clyne – bass
- Harold McNair – flute, tenor saxophone
- Daryl Runswick – bass
- Ray Warleigh – flute
- Spike Wells – drums
- Kenny Wheeler – trumpet
- The Ladybirds – voices
- The Hooray String Section – strings
- Brian Gascoigne – orchestrations
