= Blossom Dearie Sings Comden and Green =

Studio album by Blossom Dearie
- Released: 1959
- Recorded: April 8–9, 1959
- Genre: Jazz
- Label: Verve
- Producers: Norman Granz, Blossom Dearie

Blossom Dearie chronology
Once Upon a Summertime (1959)	Blossom Dearie Sings Comden and Green (1959)	My Gentleman Friend (1961)

Professional ratings
Review scores
Source	Rating
AllMusic	3/5 stars
The Penguin Guide to Jazz Recordings	3/4 stars

Blossom Dearie Sings Comden and Green is a 1959 album by Blossom Dearie, focusing on the work of lyricists Betty Comden and Adolph Green.

== Track listing ==
1. "Lucky to Be Me" (Leonard Bernstein) – 4:02
2. "Just in Time" (Jule Styne) – 3:33
3. "Some Other Time" (Bernstein) – 3:57
4. "Dance Only with Me" (Styne) – 2:58
5. "I Like Myself" (André Previn) – 3:31
6. "The Party's Over" (Styne) – 4:22
7. "How Will He Know" (Styne) – 2:54
8. "It's Love" (Bernstein) – 2:50
9. "Hold Me, Hold Me, Hold Me" (Styne) – 3:25
10. "Lonely Town" (Bernstein) – 3:33

All lyrics by Betty Comden and Adolph Green, composers indicated.

== Personnel ==
- Blossom Dearie – vocal, piano
- Kenny Burrell – guitar
- Ray Brown – double bass
- Ed Thigpen – drums
