= Blossom Dearie Sings Rootin' Songs =

Studio album by Blossom Dearie
- Released: 1963
- Recorded: 1963
- Genre: Jazz
- Label: Hires Root Beer/DIW
- Producer: Ed Mahoney

Blossom Dearie chronology
Soubrette Sings Broadway Hit Songs (1960)	Blossom Dearie Sings Rootin' Songs (1963)	May I Come In? (1964)

Professional ratings
Review scores
Source	Rating
Allmusic	link

Blossom Dearie Sings Rootin' Songs is a 1963 studio album by Blossom Dearie.

Her first album after leaving Verve Records, Blossom Dearie Sings Rootin' Songs was recorded for Hires Root Beer, on whose television commercials Dearie had sung. The album was originally available for 50¢ and two bottle caps. Vinyl copies are now rare but it has been released on CD most recently by DIW Records, a Japanese record label, in 2008 (ASIN B0012F9BKM).

== Song listing ==
1. "Days of Wine and Roses" (Henry Mancini, Johnny Mercer) – 2:28
2. "I Left My Heart in San Francisco" (George Cory, Douglass Cross) – 2:41
3. "I Wanna Be Around" (Johnny Mercer, Sadie Vimmerstadt) – 2:34
4. "The Sweetest Sounds" (Richard Rodgers) – 2:33
5. "The Good Life" (Sacha Distel, Jack Reardon) – 2:47
6. "Those Lazy-Hazy-Crazy Days of Summer" (Hans Carste, Charles Tobias) – 2:08
7. "Desafinado" (Antônio Carlos Jobim, Newton Mendonça, Jon Hendricks, Jesse Cavanagh) – 3:10
8. "Our Day Will Come" (Bob Hilliard, Mort Garson) – 2:33
9. "Fly Me to the Moon" (Bart Howard) – 2:18
10. "I've Got Your Number" (Cy Coleman, Carolyn Leigh) – 2:20
11. "What Kind of Fool Am I?" (Leslie Bricusse, Anthony Newley) – 2:46
12. "He Loves Me" (Sheldon Harnick, Jerry Bock) – 2:26

== Personnel ==
- Blossom Dearie – vocals
- Joe Harnell – piano, arranger
- Jerome Richardson – flute, tenor saxophone
- Dick Romoff – bass
- Teddy Sommer – drums
