= Charles Trenet =

French singer-songwriter (1913–2001)

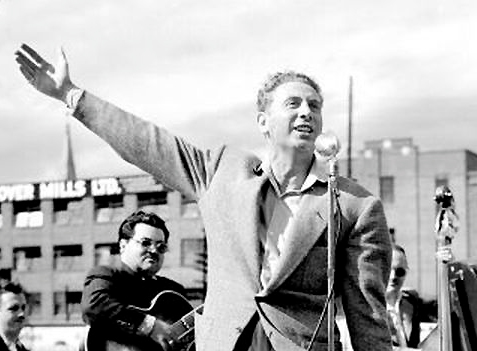
- Trenet in concert at Delorimier Stadium, Montreal, Quebec, Canada, 24 July 1946

Background information
- Born: Louis Charles Augustin Georges Trenet; 18 May 1913; Narbonne, France
- Died: 19 February 2001 (aged 87) Créteil, France
- Genres: Jazz, Easy Listening Seasonal
- Instrument: Vocals
- Years active: 1933–1999
- Labels: Pathé-Marconi, Columbia

Louis Charles Augustin Georges Trenet (French pronunciation: [lwi ʃaʁl oɡystɛ̃ ʒɔʁʒ tʁenɛ]; 18 May 1913 – 19 February 2001) was a renowned French singer-songwriter who composed both the music and the lyrics for nearly 1,000 songs over a career that lasted more than 60 years. These songs include "Boum!" (1938), "La Mer" (1946) and "Nationale 7" (1955). Trenet is also noted for his work with musicians Michel Emer and Léo Chauliac, with whom he recorded "Y'a d'la joie" (1938) for the first and "La Romance de Paris" (1941) and "Douce France" (1947) for the latter. He was awarded an Honorary Molière Award in 2000.

== Early life ==
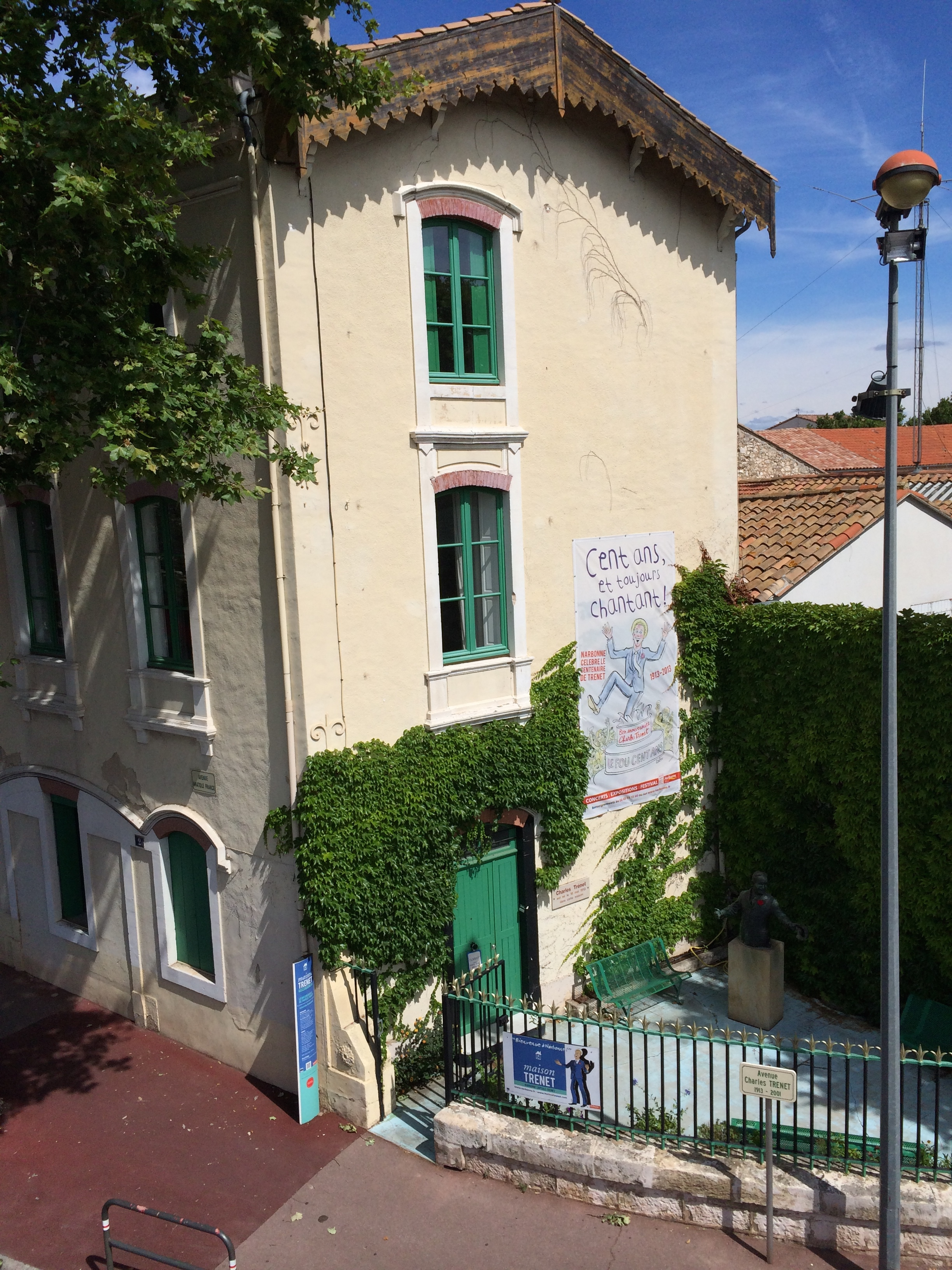
The house where Charles Trenet was born, in Narbonne (Aude), France, now opened to visitors

Trenet was born in Avenue Charles Trenet, Narbonne, Occitanie, France, the son of Françoise Louise Constance (Caussat) and Lucien Etienne Paul Trenet. When he was age seven (1920), his parents divorced, and he was sent to boarding school in Béziers, but he returned home just a few months later, suffering from typhoid fever. It was during his convalescence at home that he developed his artistic talents, such as performing music, painting and sculpting. His mother remarried, and he lived with her and his stepfather, writer Benno Vigny.

In 1922, Trenet moved to Perpignan, this time as a day pupil. André Fons-Godail, the "Catalan Renoir" and a friend of the family, took him for excursions with painting. His poetry is said to have the painter's eye for detail and colour. Many of his songs refer to his surroundings such as places near Narbonne, the Pyrenees and the Mediterranean coast.

He was expelled from school in 1928 for having insulted a supervisor. He nonetheless passed his baccalauréat with high marks in 1928 or 1929. After leaving school, he left for Berlin, where he studied art, and later, he also briefly studied at art schools in France. When Trenet first arrived in Paris in the 1930s, he worked in a movie studio as a props handler and assistant, and later joined the artists in the Montparnasse neighbourhood. His admiration for the surrealist poet and Catholic mystic Max Jacob (1876–1944) and his love of jazz were two factors that influenced Trenet's songs.

== Before World War II ==
From 1933 to 1936, he worked with the Swiss pianist Johnny Hess as a duo known as Charles and Johnny. They performed at various Parisian venues, such as Le Fiacre, La Villa d'Este, the Européen and the Alhambra. They recorded 18 discs for Pathé, the most successful of which was "Quand les beaux jours seront là/Sur le Yang-Tsé-Kiang". The Charles and Johnny records feature Hess on piano, with the two frequently singing in two-part harmonies with quickly alternating solo spots for the two. Around 1935, the duo appeared regularly on the radio on a broadcast titled Quart d'heure des enfants terribles.

The duo continued until 1936 when Trenet was called up for national service at the Istres airbase. Assisted by impresario Émile Audiffred, he performed a few solo shows; at one of these—held at the Grand Hôtel Noailles cabaret in Marseille—he was dubbed the “Singing Madman” (le Fou chantant). He began his solo career in 1937, recording for Columbia, his first disc being "Je chante/Fleur bleue". The exuberant "Je chante" gave rise to the notion of Trenet as a "singing vagabond", a theme that appeared in a number of his early songs and films. He shot to stardom very quickly; as Jean Cocteau put it, when Trenet sang, "He was so young, so fresh that the bar yielded to a rustic decor, the projectors became the stiff branches of a cherry tree, the microphone a hollyhock, the piano a cow."

== World War II ==
Like some other French artists, Trenet chose to entertain the occupying Nazi forces for fear of losing his career. He agreed, when asked by the Germans, to sing for French prisoners of war in Germany.

At the start of World War II, Trenet was drafted into the French army. He was in barracks at Salon-de-Provence until he was demobilized in June 1940, when he moved back to Paris. There he performed at the Folies Bergère and the Gaîté Parisienne (two famous cabarets) in front of a public often consisting of German officers and soldiers.

The collaborationist press tried to smear him by claiming that "Trenet" was an anagram of his real, supposedly Jewish name, "Netter". However, Trenet was able to show his family tree to the Vichy authorities, thus proving that he was not Jewish.

During the Épuration légale ("legal purge"), the wave of official trials that followed the Liberation of France and the fall of the Vichy Regime, a court examined whether Trenet was guilty of collaboration. The inquiry resulted in a formal reprimand, though without any material consequences.

== After World War II ==
After the end of hostilities, he moved to the United States where he lived for a few years and where he quickly became a success. After a few concerts at the Bagdad in New York City, Trenet became a big hit and was approached by Hollywood. He met Louis Armstrong and began a long-lasting friendship with Charlie Chaplin.

On 14 September 1951, Trenet returned to Paris and made a comeback at the Théâtre de l'Étoile. He incorporated 10 new songs into his act, including "De la fenêtre d'en haut" and "La Folle Complainte". In 1954, he performed at the Olympia music-hall in Paris for the first time. The following year, he wrote the famous "Route nationale 7", a tribute to the introduction of paid holidays.

In 1958, Trenet was the headlining act at the Bobino and the Alhambra. In 1960, he returned to the Théâtre de l'Étoile, appearing on stage for the first time without the famous trilby hat that long had been part of his act.

In 1963, Trenet spent 28 days in prison in Aix-en-Provence. He was charged with corrupting the morals of four young men under the age of 21 (they were 19). His chauffeur claimed that Trenet was using him as a pimp. The charges eventually were dropped, but the affair brought to public light the fact that Trenet was homosexual. He was never particularly public about the episode and spoke of it rarely. In his authorized biography of Maurice Chevalier, author David Bret writes that Chevalier and Mistinguett were the ones who first "shopped" Trenet to the police for consorting with underage boys, around 1940. Trenet never learned of their actions.

== 1970s ==
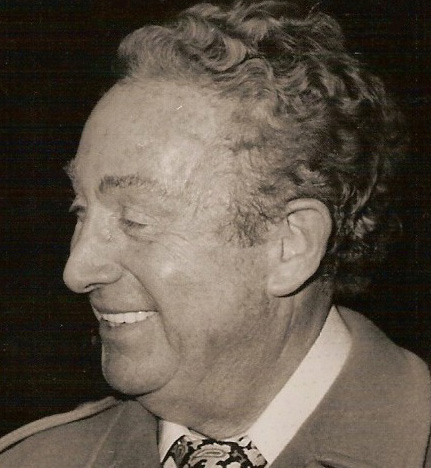
Trenet at the first Printemps de Bourges in 1977

In 1970, Trenet flew to Japan to represent France at the Universal Exhibition in Osaka. The following year, he left Columbia, his longtime record label, and recorded "Fidèle" and "Il y avait des arbres". He also made a memorable appearance at the Olympia.

In 1973, Trenet, who had just celebrated his 60th birthday, recorded the album Chansons en liberté. The 12 songs on the album were a mix of old and new compositions. His 60th birthday was celebrated in grand style by the French media.

Trenet made a surprise announcement in 1975, declaring that he was retiring from the music world. At the end of his final concert at the Olympia, he bade his audience an emotional farewell. Following the death of his mother in 1979, he shut himself away from the world for the next two years.

== Later career and death ==
Nevertheless, in 1981, Trenet made a comeback with an album devoted to sentimental memories of his childhood. Trenet then returned to his peaceful semiretirement in Occitanie, occasionally reappearing for special gala performances in France or abroad. After giving farewell concerts in France, Trenet was persuaded out of retirement by French-Canadian lawyer Gilbert Rozon in 1983 for a farewell concert in Montreal. Rozon became Trenet's manager thereafter, and as a result, Trenet performed many more concerts, including a series every night for three weeks at the Palais des Congrès in Paris in 1986.

On 21 May 1999, he returned to the music scene with his album Les poètes descendent dans la rue (Poets Take to the Streets). Following the release of the album, Trenet returned to the live circuit.

In April 2000, Trenet was rushed to the hospital after suffering a stroke. The singer was forced to spend several weeks in the hospital while recovering. By autumn of that year, he was well enough to attend the dress rehearsal of Charles Aznavour's show at the Palais des Congrès on 25 October. It was his final public appearance.

In November 2000, the Narbonne house in which Trenet was born, which had become 13 Avenue Charles Trenet, was turned into a small museum. Visitors could view souvenirs from Trenet's childhood and family life--especially those belonging to his mother, who had spent most of her life in the house--as well as original drafts of the songs that made his career.

Trenet died three months later, on 19 February 2001, after suffering another stroke.

In 2017, a service center on the A9 autoroute between Narbonne and Béziers was renamed in his memory. It contains an exhibition evoking his life and work, as well as sculptures by Pascale and Thierry Delorme.

== Songs and legacy ==
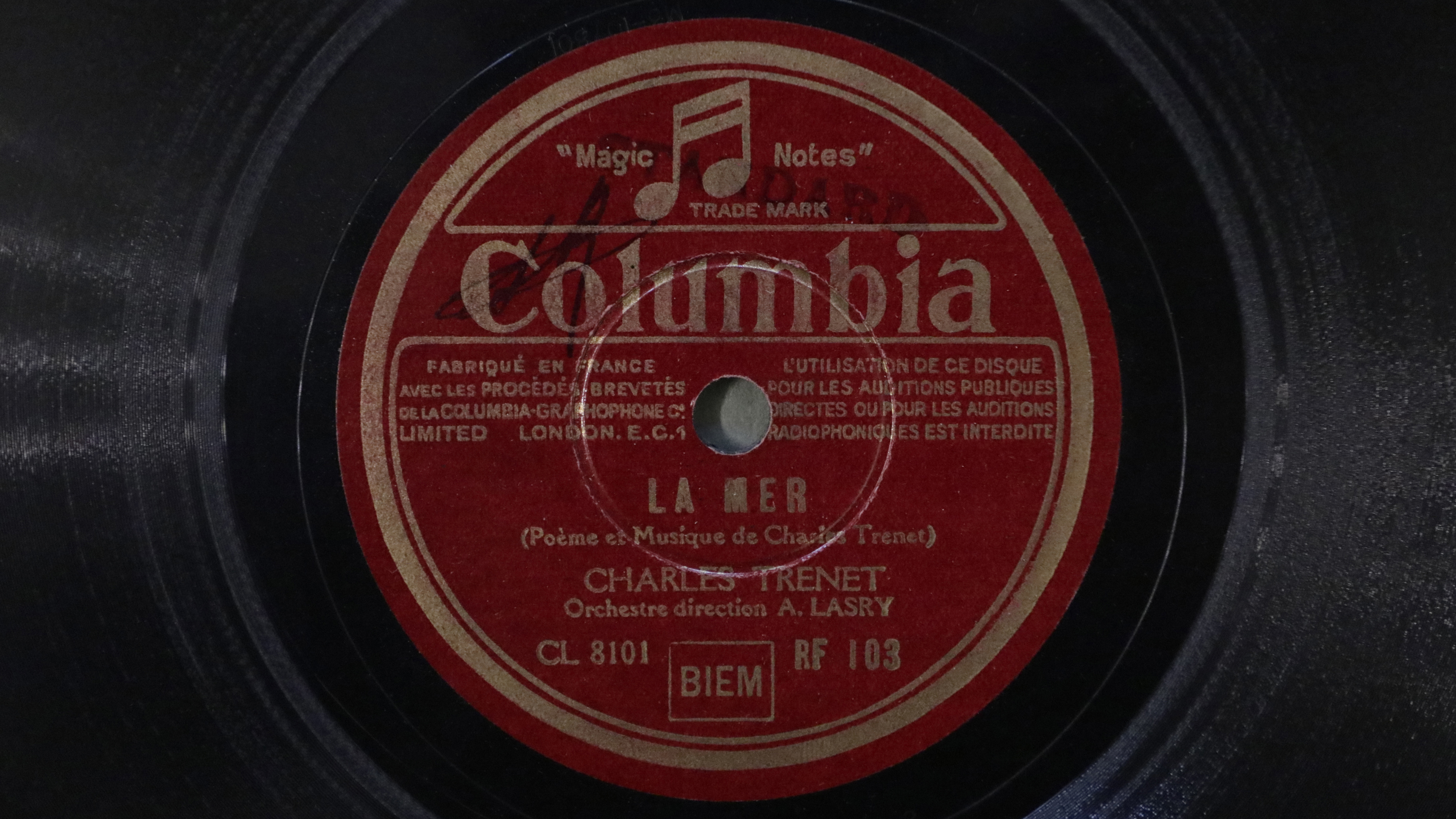
Charles Trenet. La mer (78 rpm Columbia)

Trenet's best-known songs are "Boum!", "La Mer", "Y'a d'la joie", "Que reste-t-il de nos amours?", "Ménilmontant" and "Douce France". His catalog of songs is enormous, numbering close to 1,000.

Some of his songs had unconventional subject matter, with whimsical imagery bordering on the surreal. "Y'a d'la joie" evokes joy through a series of disconnected images, including the image of a subway car shooting out of its tunnel into the air, the Eiffel Tower crossing the street, and a baker making excellent bread. The lovers engaged in a minuet in "Polka du Roi" reveal themselves at length to be "no longer human": they are made of wax and trapped in the Musée Grévin. Many of his hits from the 1930s and 1940s effectively combine the melodic and verbal nuances of French song with American swing rhythms.

His song "La Mer", which according to legend he composed with Léo Chauliac on a train in 1943, was recorded in 1946. Trenet explained in an interview that he was told that "La Mer" was not swing enough to be a hit, and for that reason, it sat in a drawer for three years before it was recorded.

"La Mer" is Trenet's best-known work outside the French-speaking world, with more than 400 recorded versions. The tune, given unrelated English words and the title "Beyond the Sea" (or sometimes "Sailing"), was a hit for Bobby Darin in the early 1960s and George Benson in the mid-1980s. "Beyond the Sea" was used in the ending credits of Finding Nemo.

Besides "La Mer", the other Trenet song to receive numerous recordings in English is "Que reste-t-il de nos amours?", which lyricist Albert Beach adapted as "I Wish You Love". "I Wish You Love" was first recorded by Keely Smith in 1957 and since then by artists including Frank Sinatra, Blossom Dearie, Sam Cooke, and Dusty Springfield.

"Formidable", another of Trenet's songs, was written as impressions of a trip to the United States Other Trenet songs were recorded by French singers such as Maurice Chevalier, Jean Sablon, and Fréhel.

== Honors and awards ==
- Commander of the Ordre des Arts et des Lettres (1982)
- Officer of the Ordre des Palmes académiques (1989)
- Commander of the Ordre national du Mérite (1995)
- Commander of the Legion of Honour (1998)

== Discography ==
Some of Charles Trenet's best-known songs are:

- 1933: "L'école buissonnière" (music co-written with Johnny Hess)
- 1936: "Vous oubliez votre cheval"
- 1937: "Je chante"
- 1937: "Fleur bleue"
- 1937: "J'ai ta main"
- 1937: "Vous qui passez sans me voir" (music co-written with Johnny Hess)
- 1937: "Y a d'la joie"
- 1938: "Boum!"
- 1938: "J'ai connu de vous"
- 1938: "Ménilmontant"
- 1938: "La polka du roi"
- 1939: "Il pleut dans ma chambre"
- 1939: "Mam'zelle Clio"
- 1941: "Swing troubadour"
- 1941: "Un rien me fait chanter" (music co-written with Léo Chauliac)
- 1942: "Que reste-t-il de nos amours?" (music co-written with Léo Chauliac)
- 1943: "Douce France" (music co-written with Léo Chauliac)
- 1945: "La folle complainte"
- 1945: "La mer"
- 1947: "Revoir Paris"
- 1948: "France-Dimanche"
- 1948: "Grand-maman, c'est New York"
- 1949: "Mes jeunes années"
- 1951: "L'ame des poetes" (performed with Son Quartette Ondioline)
- 1951: "Le serpent python"
- 1954: "Coin de rue"
- 1955: "La java du diable"
- 1955: "Moi j'aime le music-hall"
- 1955: "Route Nationale 7"
- 1957: "Le jardin extraordinaire"
- 1961: "Kangourou"
- 1963: "La famille musicienne"
- 1969: "Il y avait des arbres"
- 1970: "Au bal de la nuit"
- 1970: "L'oiseau des vacances"
- 1970: "Le revenant"
- 1971: "Fidele"
- 1974: "Joue-Moi De L'Electrophone"
- 1999: "Les Poètes descendent dans la rue"
