= Hooray for What! =

- Music: Harold Arlen
- Lyrics: E. Y. Harburg
- Book: Howard Lindsay and Russel Crouse
- Productions: 1937 Broadway

Hooray for What! is an anti-war musical with music by Harold Arlen, lyrics by E. Y. Harburg and a book by Howard Lindsay and Russel Crouse. It introduced the song "Down With Love".

== Productions ==
The original Broadway production opened at the Winter Garden Theatre on December 1, 1937, and ran for 200 performances. Directors were Vincente Minnelli and Howard Lindsay, and choreographers were Robert Alton and Agnes de Mille (her first Broadway choreography). The cast featured Ed Wynn as Chuckles, Jack Whiting as Breezy Cunningham, Paul Haakon (Principal Dancer), June Clyde as Annabel Lewis (replacing Hannah Williams), Vivian Vance as Stephanie Stephanovich (replacing Kay Thompson), Hugh Martin (Singing Ensemble), Ralph Blane as A Spy, and Meg Mundy (Singing Ensemble). Martin also did the vocal arrangements. Life magazine called it "the funniest show of the year."

42nd Street Moon Theatre Company, San Francisco, California, presented the musical in a staged concert, in November 2004.

It was presented by "The Medicine Show", New York City, in 2008.

== Plot ==
In Sprinkle, Indiana, Chuckles, a chemist, accidentally discovers a poisonous gas that could dominate the world. Breezy Cunningham is a weapons manufacturer, and tries to get the formula; when Chuckles refuses, Breezy hires the famous and alluring spy Stephanie Stephanovich to tempt it from Chuckles. Chuckles does not give in to Stephanie's wiles but goes to the League of Nations Peace Conference in Geneva to try to sell his discovery, which has somehow turned into a "love" potion. Meanwhile, Breezy, Stephanie, and their cohorts try to obtain the formula for the poisonous gas.

== Musical numbers ==
Act 1

- "Hooray For What!" – Ensemble
- "God's Country" – Breezy Cunningham, Specialty Act, Singing Ensemble and Dancing Ensemble - later featured in Babes in Arms (film) 1939
- "I've Gone Romantic on You" – Breezy Cunningham and Annabel Lewis
- "Moanin' in the Mornin'" – Stephanie Stephanovich and Singing Spies
- "Viva for Geneva" – Ensemble
- "Life's a Dance" – Benjamin Benedict
- "Napoleon's a Pastry" – Breezy Cunningham and Annabel Lewis
- "Down With Love" – Breezy Cunningham, Annabel Lewis, Stephanie Stephanovich and Ensemble

Act 2

- "A Fashion Girl" – A Spy and Singers
- "The Night of the Embassy Ball" – Stephanie Stephanovich
- "In the Shade of the New Apple Tree" – Breezy Cunningham, Annabel Lewis, A Spy and Singers

Note: One song cut from the final production, "I'm Hanging On to You", was later re-written with new lyrics to become "If I Only Had a Brain/a Heart/the Nerve" for a future Arlen-Harburg collaboration, the 1939 film adaptation of The Wizard of Oz. "Napoleon's a Pastry" provided the title for a completely different song in another Arlen-Harburg musical, 1957's Jamaica where it was sung by Lena Horne. The original song resurfaced in the 42nd Street Moon production of Hooray for What!
