= Ruth Tester =

American singer

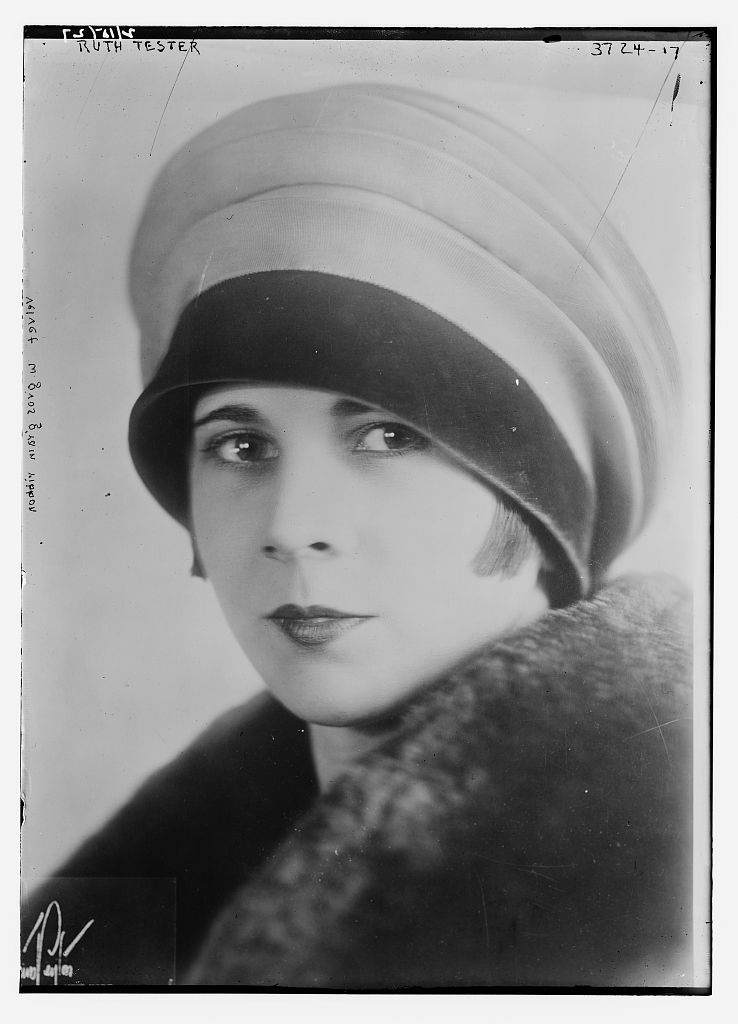
Publicity photo of Ruth Tester, 1927

Ruth Tester (August 17, 1903 – March 21, 1993) was an American singer and dancer in Broadway musicals of the 1920s and 1930s.

== Biography ==
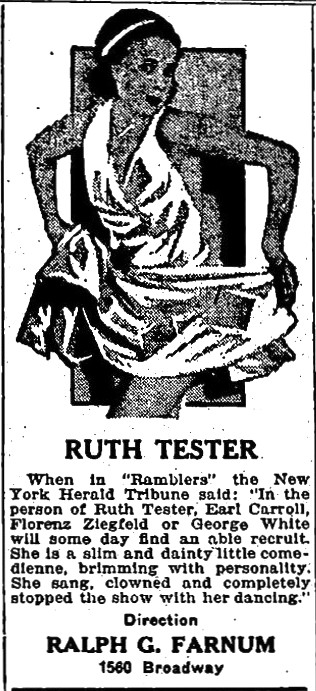
Publicity ad for Ruth Tezster in Variety, April 17, 1929

Tester was born on August 17, 1903. She was married for 59 years to Fredrick Carothers. In her later years, Tester and her husband lived in Wellesley Hills, Massachusetts. Carothers worked as a sales executive, and died in 1990.

Tester sang "Sing Something Simple" in "The Garrick Gaieties" of 1930 at the Guild Theatre in New York City and performed with Rosalind Russell and Imogene Coca. She also danced with Allan Gould in the short subject film, "Makers of Melody (1929)", singing the Rodgers and Hart song "Manhattan", often called, "I'll Take Manhattan". Richard Rodgers and Lorenz Hart appeared in this short as themselves. "Manhattan" was Rodgers and Hart's first hit.

Tester died at the age of 89 in a nursing home in Weston, Massachusetts on March 21, 1993.

== Broadway stage credits ==
- Lollipop, Knickerbocker Theatre (January 21, 1924 - May 31, 1924) Ruth Tester in ensemble
- A Lucky Break, Cort Theater (August 11, 1925 - August 1925) Ruth Tester as Claudia
- Bunk of 1926, Heckscher Theater and Broadhurst Theatre (February 16, 1926 - May 19, 1926)
- The Garrick Gaieties of 1930, Guild Theatre (June 4, 1930), Ruth Tester as herself
- Second Little Show, Royale Theatre (September 2, 1930 - October 1930)
- The Garrick Gaieties of 1930, Guild Theatre (October 16, 1930 for 10 performances), Ruth Tester as herself
- The Ramblers, Lyric Theatre (September 20, 1826 - May 28, 1927) Ruth Tester as Jenny Wren
- The Gang's All Here, Imperial Theatre (February 18, 1931 - March 9, 1931) Ruth Tester as Peggy

== Filmography ==
- Makers of Melody (1929), Ruth Tester as herself
