= Ralph Blane =

American songwriter (1914–1995)

- Born: Ralph Uriah Hunsecker; July 26, 1914; Broken Arrow, Oklahoma, US
- Died: November 13, 1995 (aged 81) Broken Arrow, Oklahoma, US
- Genres: Musical theatre, popular
- Occupations: Composer; lyricist; performer
- Formerly of: Hugh Martin, Harry Warren, Harold Arlen, Kay Thompson

Ralph Blane (July 26, 1914 – November 13, 1995) was an American composer, lyricist, and performer.

== Life and career ==
Blane was born Ralph Uriah Hunsecker in Broken Arrow, Oklahoma. He attended Tulsa Central High School. He studied singing with Estelle Liebling in New York City. He began his career as a radio singer for NBC in the 1930s before turning to Broadway, where he was featured in New Faces of 1936 (1936), Hooray for What! (1937), and Louisiana Purchase (1940). In 1940 he formed a vocal quartet ("The Martins") with his friend Hugh Martin which performed on radio and in nightclubs.

Martin and Blane formed a songwriting partnership. Together they wrote music and lyrics to Best Foot Forward (1941). The duo penned many American standards for the stage and MGM musicals. The team's best-known songs include "The Boy Next Door", "Have Yourself a Merry Little Christmas" and "The Trolley Song", all written for the 1944 film musical Meet Me in St. Louis. Facing the challenge of writing a song about a trolley, the duo visited a public library, and in a book they found the caption "Clang, clang, clang went the trolley", which formed the nucleus for the lyric of their song, which earned them their first Oscar nomination (their second was for "Pass That Peace Pipe", written in collaboration with Roger Edens for the 1947 film adaptation of Good News). Meet Me in St. Louis was adapted for a 1989 Broadway musical of the same name.

Blane also collaborated with Harry Warren, Harold Arlen, and Kay Thompson, among others. Blaine is also wrote the music and lyrics for the Broadway show Three Wishes for Jamie (1952).

In 1983, Blane was inducted into the Songwriters Hall of Fame.

In 1991, Blane sang "Have Yourself a Merry Little Christmas" at The Magic Kingdom in performances of Walt Disney World's Christmas Candlelight Processional. George Kennedy narrated the Christmas Story during the performances.

He is buried in Broken Arrow's Park Grove Cemetery.
