= Once Upon a Summertime (Blossom Dearie album) =

Studio album by Blossom Dearie
- Released: 1959
- Recorded: September 12–13, 1958
- Genre: Jazz
- Length: 35:39
- Label: Verve Records
- Producer: Norman Granz, Blossom Dearie

Blossom Dearie chronology
Give Him the Ooh-La-La (1958)	Once Upon a Summertime (1959)	Blossom Dearie Sings Comden and Green (1960)

Professional ratings
Review scores
Source	Rating
AllMusic	4/5 stars
The Penguin Guide to Jazz Recordings	3.5/4 stars

Once Upon a Summertime is an album by Blossom Dearie. It was released in 1959 by Verve Records.

== Background ==
This is the third in a series of six albums recorded by Dearie for the Verve label. The liner notes quote Dearie as saying "Norman Granz called and asked me to make another album with Tom Nola. He had Ray Brown playing bass, Mundell Lowe playing guitar, and Ed Thigpen playing drums. I could pick the songs and write the arrangements. How could a girl go wrong? So, by twisting my arm a few times he seemed to persuade me to go ahead with it... even though I resisted stubbornly."

== Track listing ==
1. "Tea for Two" (Irving Caesar, Vincent Youmans) – 3:20
2. "The Surrey with the Fringe on Top" (Richard Rodgers, Oscar Hammerstein II) – 4:16
3. "Moonlight Saving Time" (Irving Kahal, Harry Richman) – 1:59
4. "It Amazes Me" (Cy Coleman, Carolyn Leigh) – 4:16
5. "If I Were a Bell" (Frank Loesser) – 3:05
6. "We're Together" (Steve Allen, Don Elliott) – 2:02
7. "Teach Me Tonight" (Sammy Cahn, Gene DePaul) – 2:38
8. "Once Upon a Summertime" (Eddie Barclay, Michel Legrand, Eddy Marnay, Johnny Mercer) – 2:43
9. "Down With Love" (Harold Arlen, Yip Harburg) – 1:39
10. "Manhattan" (Rodgers, Lorenz Hart) – 4:16
11. "Doop-Doo-De-Doop (A Doodlin' Song)" (Coleman, Leigh) – 2:15
12. "Our Love is Here to Stay" (George Gershwin, Ira Gershwin) – 3:10

== Personnel ==
- Blossom Dearie – vocals, piano
- Ray Brown – double bass
- Mundell Lowe – guitar
- Ed Thigpen – drums
