= Hugh Martin =

American musical theater and film composer (1914–2011)

- Born: Hugh Martin; August 11, 1914; Birmingham, Alabama, U.S.
- Died: March 11, 2011 (aged 96) Encinitas, California, U.S.
- Genre: Musical theater
- Occupations: Film composer; musical theatre composer; music arranger; vocal coach; playwright
- Years active: 1937–2011

Hugh Martin (August 11, 1914 – March 11, 2011) was an American musical theater and film composer, arranger, vocal coach, and playwright. He was best known for his score for the 1944 MGM musical Meet Me in St. Louis, in which Judy Garland sang three Martin songs, "The Boy Next Door", "The Trolley Song", and "Have Yourself a Merry Little Christmas". The last of these has become a Christmas season standard in the United States and around the English-speaking world. Martin became a close friend of Garland and was her accompanist at many of her concert performances in the 1950s, including her appearances at the Palace Theater.

== Early life ==
Martin was born in Birmingham, Alabama, the son of Ellie Gordon (Robinson) and Hugh Martin, an architect. He attended Birmingham–Southern College, where he studied music.

He was a member of the Beta Beta chapter of the Alpha Tau Omega fraternity.

== Career ==
Martin wrote the music, and in some cases the lyrics, for five Broadway musicals: Best Foot Forward (1941); Look, Ma, I'm Dancin'! (1948); Make a Wish (1951); High Spirits (1964) (music and lyrics, with Timothy Gray); and Meet Me In St. Louis (1989), a stage version of the film with an expanded score by Martin and Ralph Blane. He composed the songs for the West End musical Love from Judy (1952).

Martin's first Broadway credit was as an arranger for the 1937 musical Hooray for What! and was a vocal or choral arranger for such later Broadway musicals as The Boys From Syracuse (1938–39), Too Many Girls (1939–40), DuBarry Was a Lady (1939–40), Cabin in the Sky (1940–41), and Gentlemen Prefer Blondes (1949–51), Top Banana (1951–52), and Lorelei (1974). He was a vocal arranger for Sugar Babies (1979–82).

As a performer, Martin appeared on Broadway in Hooray for What! (1937), Where Do We Go From Here (1938), and Louisiana Purchase (1940–41).

Ralph Blane was Martin's songwriting partner for most of his work, and the two recorded an album of their songs entitled Martin and Blane Sing Martin and Blane with the Ralph Burns Orchestra in 1956. Martin and Blane were twice nominated for the Academy Award for Best Song, for "The Trolley Song" in 1944, and for "Pass That Peace Pipe" (co-written by Roger Edens) from Good News in 1947.

Martin received four Tony Award nominations, three for High Spirits (Best Musical, Best Book Author of a Musical, Best Composer and Lyricist) and one for the 1990 Meet Me in St. Louis (Best Original Score).

Martin's other film work included songs for the films Athena (1954) starring Jane Powell, Debbie Reynolds, and Vic Damone, and The Girl Most Likely (1957) starring Jane Powell as well as the film version of his Broadway hit Best Foot Forward (1943) which starred Lucille Ball.

Martin collaborated with vocalist Michael Feinstein for a 1995 CD Michael Feinstein Sings The Hugh Martin Songbook, an album on which the then 80-year-old songwriter accompanied Feinstein on piano and sang a duet. On an earlier CD Feinstein recorded the Martin composition, "On Such a Night as This". In 2006, Martin released an album of his music called Hugh Sings Martin on the record label PS Classics, which drew from his catalog as a composer, lyricist, arranger and singer. The album was released in conjunction with the Library of Congress.

Martin became a Seventh-day Adventist and spent much of the 1980s as an accompanist for the female gospel vocalist Del Delker on her revival tours; in 2001 he rewrote his most famous song (with the assistance of Garland biographer John Fricke) as a more specifically religious number, "Have Yourself A Blessed Little Christmas", which was recorded that year by Delker with the 86-year-old songwriter playing piano on the recording.

== Songwriting collaboration controversy ==
Although Ralph Blane is credited with writing the music for many of Martin's songs, Martin claimed in his autobiography that he wrote both music and lyrics to all of the songs in Meet Me In St. Louis and that "all of the so-called Martin and Blane songs, (except for "Buckle Down, Winsocki" in Best Foot Forward), were written entirely by me (solo) without help from Ralph or anybody else." His explanation for allowing Blane equal credit for the songs was explained, "I was reasonably content to let him receive equal screen credit, sheet music credit, ASCAP royalties, etc., mainly because this bizarre situation was caused by my naive and atrocious lack of business acumen."

== Other ==
His autobiography Hugh Martin - The Boy Next Door was published in October 2010. Martin was inducted into the Songwriters Hall of Fame in 1983 and was a member of the Alabama Music Hall of Fame.

== Death ==
Martin died on March 11, 2011, in Encinitas, California at age ninety-six.
