= Blossom Dearie =

American jazz singer and pianist (1924–2009)

- Dearie in 1957

Background information
- Born: Margrethe Blossom Dearie; April 28, 1924; East Durham, New York, U.S.
- Died: February 7, 2009 (aged 84) New York City, U.S.
- Genres: Vocal jazz; cool jazz; swing; traditional pop
- Occupations: Singer; musician
- Instruments: Vocals; piano
- Years active: 1952–2006
- Labels: Verve/PolyGram; Daffodil; Barclay/PolyGram; Capitol/EMI
- Formerly of: The Swingle Singers; Mike Renzi; Johnny Mercer; Bob Dorough
- Spouse: Bobby Jaspar (m. 1954; div. 1957)

Margrethe Blossom Dearie (Note: In a 1985 interview with Marian McPartland, Dearie explained that Margrethe (which she spelled) is a Norwegian version of Margaret, and that it is her Christian name, but her birth certificate has her first and middle names one way, and her passport has them in the reverse order. Many sources — including those contained as references in this Wikipedia article — provide conflicting information regarding the order of her first and middle names, also sometimes providing an alternate spelling "Marguerite" or "Margrete", which are incorrect, especially considering the pronunciation and spelling by Dearie herself.) (April 28, 1924 – February 7, 2009) was an American jazz singer and pianist. She had a distinctive light and girlish voice. Dearie performed regular engagements in London and New York City over many years and collaborated with many musicians, including Johnny Mercer, Miles Davis, Jack Segal, Johnny Mandel, Duncan Lamont, Bob Dorough, Dave Frishberg, and Jay Berliner.

== Early life ==
Margrethe Blossom Dearie was born on April 28, 1924, (Note: Sometimes cited as 1926, her year of birth was actually 1924 according to most of her obituaries.) in East Durham, New York, to a father of Scots Irish descent and a mother of Norwegian descent.

She reportedly received the name Blossom because of "a neighbor who delivered peach blossoms to her house the day she was born", although she once recalled it was her brothers who brought the flowers to the house.

== Career ==
=== Beginnings ===
After high school, Dearie moved to Manhattan to pursue a music career. Dropping her first name, she began to sing in groups such as the Blue Flames (with the Woody Herman Orchestra) and the Blue Reys (with Alvino Rey's band) before starting her solo career. Gerry Mulligan, in his album notes for The Birth of the Cool, lists her as one of the "more or less regulars" at Gil Evans's basement apartment on Manhattan's 55th Street in the late 1940s.

Dearie moved to Paris in 1952. She formed a vocal group, the Blue Stars (1952–1955), which included Michel Legrand's sister, Christiane, and Bob Dorough. In 1954, the group had a hit in France with a French-language version of "Lullaby of Birdland", arranged by Michel Legrand. The Blue Stars would later evolve into the Swingle Singers. On Dearie's first solo album, released two years later, she played the piano but did not sing.

In 1954, Dearie and King Pleasure recorded "Moody's Mood for Love" (a vocal adaptation by Eddie Jefferson of a James Moody sax solo for "I'm in the Mood for Love") and this is so noted on the Prestige album King Pleasure Sings. One of Dearie's most famous song recordings from that period is "The Riviera", with music by Cy Coleman and lyrics by Joseph McCarthy, in 1956.

=== Late 1950s and 1960s ===
After returning from France in 1957, Dearie made her first six American albums as a solo singer and pianist for Verve Records in the late 1950s and early 1960s, mostly in a small trio or quartet setting. Dave Garroway, host of The Today Show and an early fan of Dearie, featured her on several occasions, increasing her exposure with the popular audience. In 1962, Dearie recorded a radio commercial for Hires Root Beer. As it proved very popular, the LP Blossom Dearie Sings Rootin' Songs was released as a premium item that could be ordered for one dollar and a proof of purchase.

In 1964, Dearie recorded the album May I Come In? (Capitol/EMI Records). It was recorded (atypically for her) with an orchestra. During this same period, she frequently performed at New York supper clubs and, in 1966, made her first appearance at Ronnie Scott's club in London. Dearie recorded four albums in the United Kingdom during the 1960s that were released on the Fontana label, including a recording of her 1966 performance at Ronnie Scott's. She also performed regularly on Bernard Braden's TV show. For a time she also performed with Dutch singer Ramses Shaffy.

=== 1970s and later ===
In 1970, after a period of inactivity, Dearie released the album That's Just the Way I Want to Be (including her homage to Dusty Springfield). In 1974, she established her own label, Daffodil Records, which allowed her to fully control the recording and distribution of her albums. Dearie appeared on television throughout her career, including voice work for the children's educational series Schoolhouse Rock!. Some of her pieces in this series were written by her friend Bob Dorough, the jazz singer and composer with whom she performed in Paris in the 1950s. Her voice can be heard on "Mother Necessity", "Figure Eight", and "Unpack Your Adjectives". She received a Grammy nomination in 1973 for Best Recording for Children with the album Multiplication Rock.

The songwriter Johnny Mercer, with whom Dearie collaborated for her 1975 song "I'm Shadowing You", gave one of his final compositions to her for the title song of her 1976 Daffodil album My New Celebrity is You. According to Dearie, she and Mercer were close friends.

In 1983, Dearie was awarded the first Mabel Mercer Foundation Award.

=== Other ===
Dearie's voice and songs have been featured on the soundtracks of several films and television shows, including Kissing Jessica Stein, My Life Without Me, The Squid and the Whale, The Adventures of Felix, The Artist, The Marvelous Mrs. Maisel (series), Call the Midwife (series), and Can You Ever Forgive Me?

She also recorded songs with other singers, including Lyle Lovett. She continued to perform in clubs until 2006. She appeared regularly on British television with Peter Cook and Dudley Moore, several times as a guest of Jack Paar on his Tonight show, and also appeared on The Danny Kaye Show, The David Frost Show, and The Merv Griffin Show.

== Musicianship ==
Throughout her career, Dearie was considered a "musician's musician". She learned piano from the age of five, initially focusing on Western classical music, and only began focusing on jazz after moving back to East Durham at around ten years of age. She listened to musicians such as Count Basie, Benny Goodman, and Duke Ellington, likely forming her pianistic style from such instrumentalists.

Dearie's technique for learning songs was complex. First, she would sit down and learn the song at the piano. Once she had learned it fluently, she would work on the lyrics. In interviews, she explained that playing the piano and singing were not separate in her mind, once saying that "For me it's all just one and the same thing. I don't like to do either one separately." Her skill as both a pianist and vocalist meant she knew "how to complement the singing"; in her opinion, many accompanists played "entirely too much piano for the vocalist".

Dearie's pianistic skill was arguably less recognized than her vocal talents. Shortly after her death, the pianist Dave Frishberg recalled asking Bill Evans about his use of fourths in chord voicings. Frishberg wrote that "His immediate answer was that he heard Blossom Dearie play that way and it really knocked him out. Then he did a little rave review of Blossom, naming her as one of his models of piano playing."

Dearie said that she considered herself "a jazz musician, learning to be a jazz singer".

== Vocal style ==
Dearie's vocal style was described by Natalie Weiner in The New Yorker as a "childish treble" singing "postgraduate lyrics". Her style was light and airy and was part of what made Dearie so distinctive. However, vocal coaches at the time argued that her vocal tone was the result of "improper breathing". Professionals encouraged her to "sing from her diaphragm", but she brushed off this suggestion. In a 2003 interview she said "I think that would probably make my voice more powerful, but at this age, I don't think I'm going to worry about it. I have never been a singer who could stand up and sing like a theatrical singer. I sit down, and I've always used a microphone. I have a kind of microphone technique." Weiner passed along a possibly apocryphal description of her by Miles Davis as "the only white woman who had soul".

== Personal life and final years ==
Dearie lived in Paris, France, during the early 1950s; here she met and in 1954 married Bobby Jaspar, a Belgian flautist and saxophonist. The marriage ended in divorce in 1957. She never married again.

On February 7, 2009, after a long illness and failing health, Dearie died in her sleep of natural causes at her apartment in Greenwich Village, according to her representative and manager Donald Schaffer. She was cremated, and her ashes were interred at National Memorial Park in Falls Church, Virginia.

== Daffodil Records ==
Daffodil Records
- Founded: 1973
- Founder: Blossom Dearie
- Genre: Jazz
- Country of origin: U.S.
- Location: East Durham, New York
- Official website: blossomdearie.com

Daffodil Records is a record label that was founded by Dearie in 1973. In addition to being one of the first independent labels founded by a woman, she was the label's only artist.

== Discography ==
- Miss Blossom Dearie Et Sa Musique "Jazz-Sweet" (Barclay, 1955)
- Blossom Dearie (Verve, 1957)
- Give Him the Ooh-La-La (Verve, 1958)
- Once Upon a Summertime (Verve, 1958)
- My Gentleman Friend (Verve, 1959)
- Blossom Dearie Sings Comden and Green (Verve, 1959)
- Soubrette Sings Broadway Hit Songs (Verve, 1960)
- Blossom Dearie Sings Rootin' Songs (Hires, 1963)
- May I Come In? (Capitol, 1964)
- Blossom Time at Ronnie Scott's (Fontana, 1966)
- Sweet Blossom Dearie (Fontana, 1967)
- Soon It's Gonna Rain (Fontana, 1967)
- Ben Bagley's Vernon Duke Revisited (Crewe, 1970)
- That's Just the Way I Want to Be (Fontana, 1970)
- Ben Bagley's Arthur Schwartz Revisited (Crewe, 1971)
- Blossom Dearie Sings (Daffodil, 1973)
- Ben Bagley's Alan Jay Lerner Revisited (Crewe, 1974)
- Ben Bagley's De Sylva, Brown & Henderson Revisited (RCA Victor, 1974)
- Ben Bagley's Frank Loesser Revisited (Painted Smiles, 1974)
- Ben Bagley's Rodgers and Hart Revisited (RCA Victor, 1974)
- Ben Bagley's Oscar Hammerstein Revisited (Painted Smiles, 1975)
- From the Meticulous to the Sublime (Daffodil, 1975)
- Ben Bagley's Rodgers and Hart Revisited Vol. III (Painted Smiles, 1976)
- My New Celebrity Is You (Daffodil, 1976)
- Ben Bagley's Unpublished Cole Porter (Painted Smiles, 1977)
- Winchester in Apple Blossom Time (Daffodil, 1977)
- Ben Bagley's Cole Porter Revisited Vol. IV (Painted Smiles, 1979)
- Blossoms On Broadway (DRG Records, 1979)
- Needlepoint Magic (Daffodil, 1979)
- Ben Bagley's E.Y. Harburg Revisited (Painted Smiles, 1980)
- Ben Bagley's Harold Arlen and Vernon Duke Revisited (Painted Smiles, 1980)
- Ben Bagley's Ira Gershwin Revisited (Painted Smiles, 1980)
- Ben Bagley's Kurt Weill Revisited Vol. II (Painted Smiles, 1981)
- Positively (Daffodil, 1983)
- Simply (Daffodil, 1983)
- Et Tu, Bruce (Daffodil, 1984)
- Chez Wahlberg: Part One (Daffodil, 1985)
- Songs of Chelsea (Daffodil, 1987)
- Blossom Dearie Plays April in Paris (Barclay, 1987)
- Tweedledum & Tweedledee (Two People Who Resemble Each Other, in this Case Musically) with Mike Renzi (Daffodil, 1991)
- Christmas Spice So Very Nice with Mike Renzi (Daffodil, 1991)
- Me and Phil: Blossom Dearie Live in Australia (EMI, 1994)
- Blossom Dearie: Jazz Masters 51 (Verve, 1996)
- Blossom's Planet (Daffodil, 2000)
- Live in London Volume 1 (Harkit, 2002)
- Live in London Volume 2 (Harkit, 2004)
