= Best Foot Forward =

Best Foot Forward may refer to:

- Best Foot Forward (musical), 1941 American Broadway musical
- Best Foot Forward (film), 1943 American production of 1941 musical
- Best Foot Forward (cast recording), 1963 cast album of the 1963 Off-Broadway revival.
- Best Foot Forward (Max Liebman Presents), 1954 American live TV production of 1941 musical
- Best Foot Forward (play), 2017 American musical documentary play
- "Best Foot Forward" (George and Mildred), a 1976 television episode
- Best Foot Forward, 1985 compilation album by American rock band REO Speedwagon
- "Best Foot Forward", 1996 American song on studio album Endtroducing..... by DJ Shadow
- Best Foot Forward (TV series), 2022 television series based on Josh Sundquist's book Just Don't Fall
