= Partners in Crime (1973 film) =

- Genre: Crime; Drama
- Written by: David Shaw
- Directed by: Jack Smight
- Starring: Lee Grant
- Music by: Gil Mellé
- Country of origin: United States
- Original language: English

Production
- Executive producers: Richard Levinson; William Link
- Producer: Jon Epstein
- Production locations: Universal Studios - 100 Universal City Plaza, Universal City, California
- Cinematography: Jack A. Marta
- Editor: Robert F. Shugrue
- Running time: 75 mins
- Production companies: Fairmount/Foxcroft; Universal Television

Original release
- Network: NBC
- Release: March 24, 1973

Partners in Crime is a 1973 American TV movie directed by Jack Smight. It was the pilot for a prospective series about a judge who becomes a private investigator. NBC did not pick it up as a series but the pilot screened as a stand alone movie.

== Plot ==
Judge Meredith Leland becomes a private investigator along with a paroled convict.

== Cast ==
- Lee Grant as Judge Meredith Leland
- Lou Antonio
- Robert Cummings as Ralph Elsworth
- Harry Guardino as Walt Connors
- Richard Jaeckel as Frank Jordan
- Charles Drake as Lieutenant Fred Harnett
- Richard Anderson as Roger Goldsmith
- William Schallert as Oscar
- Lorraine Gary as Margery Jordan
- Gary Crosby as Trooper

== Production ==
The film was announced in December 1972.

== Reception ==
The show was the equal 27th highest rated program that week.
