= Doris Day filmography =

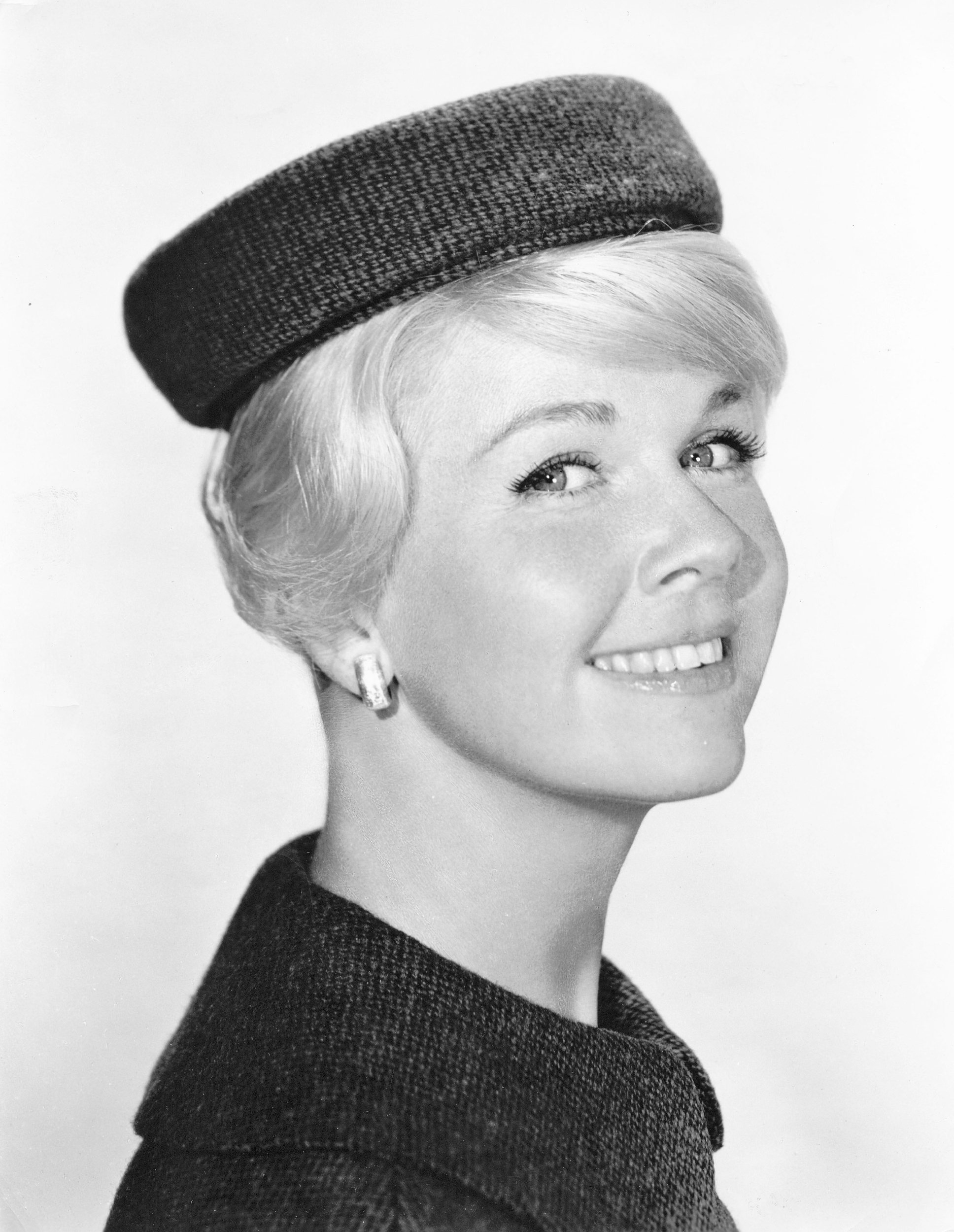
Day in a studio publicity portrait for her 1960 film Midnight Lace

American actress Doris Day appeared in 39 feature films released between 1948 and 1968. Day began her career as a band singer and eventually won the female lead in the Warner Bros. film Romance on the High Seas (1948), for which she was selected by Michael Curtiz to replace Betty Hutton. She starred in several minor musicals for Warner Bros., including Tea for Two (1950), Lullaby of Broadway (1951), April in Paris (1952), By the Light of the Silvery Moon (1953) and the hit musical Calamity Jane, in which she performed the Academy Award-winning song "Secret Love" (1953). She ended her contract with Warner Bros. after filming Young at Heart (1954) with Frank Sinatra.

Day's portrayal of singer Ruth Etting in Love Me or Leave Me (1955) with James Cagney was well received by critics and was a box-office hit. She also appeared in Alfred Hitchcock's remake of The Man Who Knew Too Much (1956), Andrew L. Stone's Julie (1956) and George Abbott and Stanley Donen's The Pajama Game (1957).

Day appeared with Rock Hudson and Tony Randall in three films: Pillow Talk (1959), Lover Come Back (1961) and Send Me No Flowers (1964). She ranked No. 1 at the box office in 1960, and again from 1962 until 1964. Day starred in several other romantic comedies, including That Touch of Mink (1962) with Cary Grant, The Thrill of It All and Move Over, Darling (both 1963), both with James Garner. After the failure of Do Not Disturb in 1965, Day's film career began to decline. She last ranked as a top-ten box-office star in 1966 with the hit film The Glass Bottom Boat.

Her final films Caprice, The Ballad of Josie (both 1967), Where Were You When the Lights Went Out? and With Six You Get Eggroll (both 1968) were critical flops but achieved reasonable success at the box office. Day declined the role of Mrs. Robinson in The Graduate, a role that eventually went to Anne Bancroft. In her published memoirs, Day said that she had rejected the part on moral grounds, finding the script "vulgar and offensive."

When her film career ended, Day turned to television with her situation comedy The Doris Day Show (1968–1973), which ran for five seasons and 128 episodes. She made several other television appearances throughout the 1970s and 1980s. Day, who was an animal lover, launched the series Doris Day's Best Friends (1985–1986), which ran for 26 episodes. She was an honoree at The 50th Annual Grammy Awards in 2008, and was last seen in archive footage in the 2009 documentary What a Difference a Day Made: Doris Day Superstar.

== Film appearances ==
Year	Title	Role
1948	Romance on the High Seas	Georgia Garrett
1949	My Dream Is Yours	Martha Gibson
1949	It's a Great Feeling	Judy Adams
1950	Young Man with a Horn	Jo Jordan
1950	Tea for Two	Nanette Carter
1950	The West Point Story	Jan Wilson
1950	Storm Warning	Lucy Rice
1951	Lullaby of Broadway	Melinda Howard
1951	On Moonlight Bay	Marjorie "Marjie" Winfield
1951	I'll See You in My Dreams	Grace LeBoy Kahn
1951	Starlift	Herself
1952	The Winning Team	Aimee Alexander
1952	April in Paris	Ethel "Dynamite" Jackson
1953	By the Light of the Silvery Moon	Marjorie "Marjie" Winfield
1953	Calamity Jane	Calamity Jane
1954	Lucky Me	Candy Williams
1954	Young at Heart	Laurie Tuttle
1955	Love Me or Leave Me	Ruth Etting
1956	The Man Who Knew Too Much	Josephine Conway "Jo" McKenna
1956	Julie	Julie Benton
1957	The Pajama Game	Katherine "Babe" Williams
1958	Teacher’s Pet	Erica Stone
1958	The Tunnel of Love	Isolde Poole
1959	It Happened to Jane	Jane Osgood
1959	Pillow Talk	Jan Morrow
1960	Please Don't Eat the Daisies	Kate Robinson Mackay
1960	Midnight Lace	Kit Preston
1961	Lover Come Back	Carol Templeton
1962	That Touch of Mink	Cathy Timberlake
1962	Billy Rose's Jumbo	Kitty Wonder
1963	The Thrill of It All	Beverly Boyer
1963	Move Over, Darling	Ellen Wagstaff Arden
1964	Send Me No Flowers	Judy Kimball
1965	Do Not Disturb	Janet Harper
1966	The Glass Bottom Boat	Jennifer Nelson
1967	Caprice	Patricia Foster
1967	The Ballad of Josie	Josie Minick
1968	Where Were You When the Lights Went Out?	Margaret Garrison
1968	With Six You Get Eggroll	Abby McClure

== Television appearances ==
- The 21st Annual Academy Awards (1949; TV special)
- The Bob Hope Show (1950; 1 episode)
- Screen Snapshots: Hollywood Night Life (1952; short)
- Screen Snapshots: Hollywood on the Ball (1952; short)
- So You Want a Television Set (cameo) (1953; short)
- A Star Is Born World Premiere (1954; short)
- What's My Line? (1954; mystery guest)
- The Ed Sullivan Show (1956; 2 episodes)
- What's My Line? (1957; mystery guest)
- The 30th Annual Academy Awards (1958, co-presenter; TV special)
- This Is Music (1958; 1 episode)
- The 31st Annual Academy Awards (1959, co-presenter; TV special)
- The 32nd Annual Academy Awards (1960, co-presenter/nominee; TV special)
- Every Girl's Dream (1966; short)
- The Doris Day Show (1968–1973; 128 episodes) Golden Globe nomination.
- The Merv Griffin Show (1970; 1 episode)
- The Governor & J.J. (1970; 1 episode)
- The Doris Mary Anne Kappelhoff Special (1971; TV special)
- The Pet Set (1971; 1 episode)
- The Merv Griffin Show (1973; 1 episode)
- The Tonight Show Starring Johnny Carson (1973; 1 episode)
- AFI Life Achievement Award: A Tribute to James Cagney (1974; TV special)
- The John Denver Show (1974; 1 episode)
- The Tonight Show Starring Johnny Carson (1974; 1 episode)
- The Tonight Show Starring Johnny Carson (1975; 1 episode)
- Doris Day Today (1975; CBS TV special)
- The Mike Douglas Show (1976; 1 episode)
- Doris Day's Best Friends (1985–1986; 26 episodes)
- The 46th Annual Golden Globe Awards (1989, winner; TV special)
- Doris Day: A Sentimental Journey (1991; TV documentary)
- Vicki! (1993, 1 episode)
- Homeward Bound (1994; TV documentary)
- Don't Pave Main Street: Carmel's Heritage (1994, Narrator; documentary)
- Pebble Mill at One (1995; 1 episode)
- The Doris Day Story: Everybody's Darling (1998; TV special)
- A&E Biography: Doris Day (1998, archive footage)
- The 50th Annual Grammy Awards (2008, honoree; TV special)
- What a Difference a Day Made: Doris Day Superstar (2009, voice only; documentary)

== Bibliography ==
- Kaufman, David (2008). Doris Day: The Untold Story of the Girl Next Door. New York: Virgin Books. ISBN 978-1-905264-30-8.
- Santopietro, Tom (2007). Considering Doris Day. Thomas Dunne Books, St. Martin's Press. Emphasis is more on body of work than on her personal life.
- DeVita, Michael (2012). "My 'Secret Love' Affair with Doris Day." Create space (Amazon). ISBN 9781478153580. Emphasis on a meeting followed by 65+ years of correspondence. Special emphasis on the incredible Doris music.
