= Lucky Me (film) =

1954 film by Jack Donohue

- Theatrical film poster
- Directed by: Jack Donohue
- Screenplay by: Irving Elinson; Robert O'Brien; James O'Hanlon
- Story by: James O'Hanlon
- Produced by: Henry Blanke
- Starring: Doris Day; Robert Cummings; Phil Silvers
- Cinematography: Wilfred M. Cline
- Edited by: Owen Marks
- Music by: Paul Francis Webster (lyrics); Sammy Fain (music)
- Production company: Warner Bros. Pictures
- Distributed by: Warner Bros. Pictures
- Release date: April 9, 1954
- Running time: 116 minutes
- Country: United States
- Language: English
- Box office: $1.9 million

Lucky Me is a 1954 American musical comedy film starring Doris Day, Robert Cummings and Phil Silvers. It was the first musical film produced in the CinemaScope process and filmed in Warnercolor.

== Plot ==
Candy Williams is a member of a struggling vaudeville troupe that is stranded in Miami when creditors take all of their money. After the troupe's leader Hap Schneider tries to scam a restaurant out of dinner, they are forced to work in the hotel to pay for the meal. While cleaning a hallway, Flo Neely hears Dick Carson singing songs for his new Broadway show. She tells Hap and Duke McGee that Dick is staying in the hotel.

Candy has met Dick but believes that he is a mechanic named Eddie. She arranges a date with him but Hap joins them and tells her that Eddie is Dick Carson. Candy leaves thinking that Dick was trying to take advantage of her. To make up for the trouble, Hap arranges a rehearsal of a new song so that Dick can watch the troupe and audition Candy for his show. However, Candy thinks that he is just trying to trick her again. He convinces her that he really wants her to star in the play. However, his backer Otis Thayer's daughter Lorraine is jealous and will not let her father back Dick's show if Candy is in it.

The troupe is leaving the hotel when Dick's manager reveals that he is giving up the show and returning to New York. Candy realizes that Dick really loves her. She returns to her room and disguises herself to surreptitiously enter Otis's birthday party, where she wants to perform Dick's songs and secure Thayer's backing for the show. The troupe accompanies her and Flo forces Lorraine to fall into a swimming pool so that Candy is free to save the day.

== Cast ==
- Doris Day as Candy Williams
- Robert Cummings as Dick Carson
- Phil Silvers as Hap Schneider
- Eddie Foy, Jr. as Duke McGee
- Nancy Walker as Flo Neely
- Martha Hyer as Lorraine Thayer
- Bill Goodwin as Otis Thayer
- Marcel Dalio as Anton
- Hayden Rorke as Tommy Arthur
- James Burke as Mahoney

== Production ==
Doris Day had begun to suffer from panic attacks before filming began and continually delayed the project in spite of pressure exerted by Warner Bros. Pictures. She was also unhappy with the script, writing in her 1976 autobiography Her Own Story: "Robert Cummings, Phil Silvers, Nancy Walker, and Eddie Foy, Jr., were all talented, funny people, but I knew by now that no amount of talent can overcome an inferior script, especially if it is a comedy." She considered allowing the studio to suspend her rather than appearing in the film, but on the advice of a friend, she fulfilled her contractual obligation. However, the filming process was difficult for her because of the panic attacks.

Angie Dickinson made her debut in the film after having won the chance as the result of a television contest. She has an uncredited bit part in the party scene. Cummings' singing voice was provided by Hal Derwin. During one of the performances, the Warner Pathé News logo and rooster makes a cameo appearance. Although an early announcement promised that the film would be produced in 3-D, it was actually made only in CinemaScope, and was the first musical to use the process.

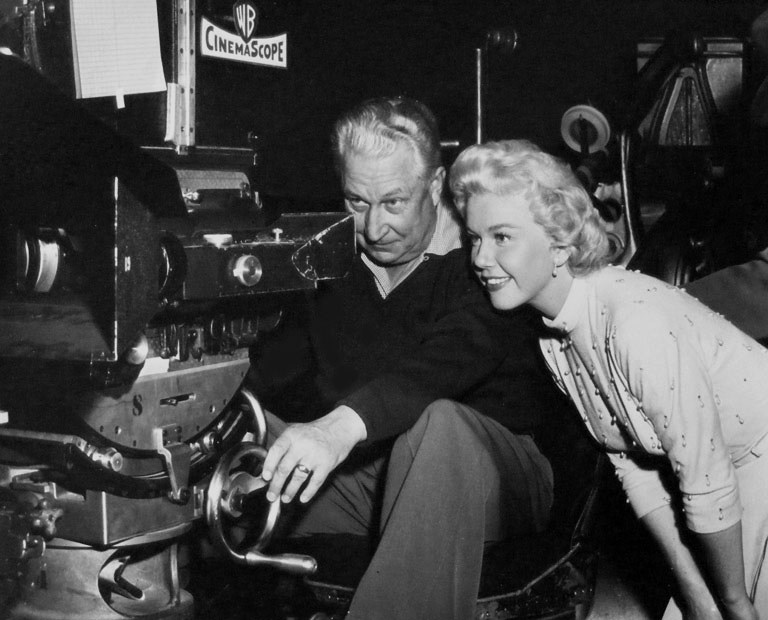
Doris Day and cinematographer Wilfred M. Cline on the film's set

The role played by Robert Cummings was originally intended for Gordon MacRae, who had previously worked with Doris Day several times. Cummings was cast in September 1953. In October 1953, Warner Bros. announced that filming would be delayed to allow Day to recover from nervous exhaustion.

Location shooting for the film took place in Miami. Martha Hyer, who had been cast on the strength of her performance in So Big later recalled "Doris was not feeling well during the filming of Lucky Me but never showed it. She was always smiling and had the rare quality of making people feel good just by being near her."

== Songs ==
- "Lucky Me"
- "Superstition Song"
- "I Speak to the Stars"
- "Take a Memo to the Moon"
- "Bluebells of Broadway"
- "High Hopes and Men"

== Reception ==
Lucky Me was not well-received upon its original release. However “I Speak to the Stars” from the film became a hit song.

Variety wrote the film "will have to depend almost entirely on the name of Doris Day to sell tickets. The singer is a proven draw, so there undoubtedly is some coin in the offing for this Cinemascope offering but there would have been much larger returns in view had the entertainment been fresher."

== See also ==
- Doris Day filmography
