= Jeannie Carson =

English-born comedian and actress (1928–2022)

- Carson in 1958
- Born: Jean Shufflebottom; 23 May 1928; Pudsey, West Riding of Yorkshire, England
- Died: 1 August 2022 (aged 94)
- Other name: Jean Carson
- Occupations: Actress, singer, dancer
- Years active: 1948–1970
- Spouses: William Redmond; Biff McGuire (m. 1960; died 2021)
- Children: 2

Jeannie Carson McGuire (born Jean Shufflebottom; 23 May 1928 – 1 August 2022) was a British-born American actress, singer, and dancer. She has a star on the Hollywood Walk of Fame.

== Early life ==
Born to show business parents in Pudsey, West Riding of Yorkshire, Carson was originally named Jean Shufflebottom. In her early British films, she performed under the name Jean Carson but later changed her given name to "Jeannie" to avoid confusion with the American actress Jean Carson.

== Career ==
Carson had an early role in A Date with a Dream (1948). In 1949 she was a principal boy at the Theatre Royal in Birmingham. She left Birmingham and was cast as the head of the chorus in Noël Coward's Ace of Clubs. In 1951 she went into a musical, Latin Quarter, at London Casino.

Carson acted in Love from Judy on stage in London. This debuted in 1951 and ran until 1953; the BBC broadcast a film version. Carson was also in the film Love in Pawn (1953). After producer Max Liebman saw her in Love from Judy, he signed her to a contract to appear on television in the United States, starting with a six-episode color version of the Broadway musical Best Foot Forward and then in a version of Heidi. In January 1953 she released her first recording on the newly formed Philips label, "Barrels and Barrels of Roses".

Carson was in two films for J. Lee Thompson co-starring Diana Dors, As Long as They're Happy (1955) and An Alligator Named Daisy (1955). In October 1956, John Davis, managing director of Rank, announced her as one of the actors under contract to Rank that Davis thought would become an international star.

In 1956, she starred in her own series Hey, Jeannie!, which aired on CBS. The series lasted one season before being cancelled in 1957, although six new episodes with a revamped format were broadcast in syndication in 1958 with the title The Jeannie Carson Show, and reruns of Hey, Jeannie! were aired in primetime during the summer of 1960, also under the title The Jeannie Carson Show. In the U.S., Carson guest-starred on episodes of What's My Line?, Jane Wyman Presents the Fireside Theatre ("A Dangerous Thing"), Wagon Train ("The Annie MacGregor Story" S1 E21 1958) and General Electric Theatre ("Time to Go Now"). On TV she acted in versions of Little Women, Berkeley Square, and A Kiss for Cinderella.

In Britain, Carson was the female lead in Rockets Galore (1958). In 1960 she was in a short-lived revival of Finian's Rainbow on Broadway. Carson appeared in the British film Seven Keys (1961) and on TV starred in versions of Quillow and the Giant, What Every Woman Knows, and The Rivals. She took over the role of Maria in The Sound of Music on Broadway in 1962. In 1969, she appeared as Marcy Vincente on the soap opera Search for Tomorrow. Oscar-winning actress Anne Revere played her mother, and Anthony George played her husband. The following year, Carson was in Blood Red Roses on Broadway.

== Personal life and death ==
Carson was married to Bill Redmond. On November 29, 1960, in London, Carson married actor Biff McGuire, her second husband, , while both were starring in the Broadway revival of Finian's Rainbow. The couple had two children. They toured together in 1961 in Camelot, with McGuire as King Arthur and Carson as Guenevere. Later, they performed at the Seattle Repertory for fifteen years, often together.

She became a naturalized United States citizen on 24 May 1965, the day after her 37th birthday.

Her death on 1 August 2022 at the age of 94 went unreported, but her will completed probate in 2023 in Los Angeles County Superior Court.

== Filmography ==
- 1948 – A Date with a Dream
- 1953 – Love in Pawn
- 1955 – As Long as They're Happy
- 1955 – An Alligator Named Daisy
- 1957 – Rockets Galore! (US title: Mad Little Island)
- 1958 – Little Women (CBS Musical) (portraying Jo March)
- 1961 – Seven Keys
- 1964 – My Fair Lady (bit part)

== Broadway appearances ==
- 1959–63 – The Sound of Music
- 1960 – Finian's Rainbow
- 1970 – Blood Red Roses

== West End appearances ==
- 1952 – Love from Judy
- 1966 – Strike a Light!

== Seattle Repertory Theatre ==
- 1974 – Life with Father
- 1984 – The Merry Wives of Windsor
- 1991 – Inspecting Carol
- 1993 – A Flaw in the Ointment
- 1995 – The Stoops to Conquer
