= The Bride Wore Boots =

1946 film by Irving Pichel

- Lobby card
- Directed by: Irving Pichel
- Written by: Dwight Michael Wiley
- Based on: play by Harry Segall
- Produced by: Seton Miller
- Starring: Barbara Stanwyck; Robert Cummings; Diana Lynn
- Cinematography: Stuart Thompson
- Edited by: Ellsworth Hoagland
- Music by: Friedrich Hollaender
- Production company: Paramount Pictures
- Distributed by: Paramount Pictures
- Release date: May 8, 1946
- Running time: 85 minutes
- Country: United States
- Language: English

The Bride Wore Boots is a 1946 American romantic comedy film with Barbara Stanwyck in the title role, playing opposite Robert Cummings. A very young Natalie Wood is seen in the film, directed by Irving Pichel.

This was Stanwyck's last feature comedy. Some years later, she complained to columnist Hedda Hopper, "I've always got my eye out for a good comedy. Remember Ball of Fire and The Lady Eve? But they don't seem to write that kind of comedy anymore -- just a series of gags."

== Plot ==
Sally Warren runs a horse farm, but her husband Jeff has a dislike and fear of horses. He is a Civil War historian and lecturer, which bores Sally but is very popular with local ladies who call themselves the Mason-Dixon Dames.

As a Christmas gift, Jeff intends to please his wife by buying her a horse called Albert, but her horse trainer Lance Gale, an old beau, insults Jeff about the kind of horse he picked. Sally in turn buys Jeff a desk that belonged to Jefferson Davis, but the Dames claim it's a fake and one of them, Mary Lou Medford, makes a pass at Jeff.

The next time Sally catches the same woman kissing Jeff, she sues him for divorce. Jeff ends up hiring Mary Lou as his secretary. To spite his wife, Jeff also enters Albert in the big Virginia Cup steeplechase race that Sally's always longed to win.

Albert's jockey is thrown, so Jeff reluctantly leaps into the saddle. He is thrown off repeatedly while trying in vain to catch Lance's horse in the race. But his effort impresses Sally, who reconciles with Jeff at the finish.

== Cast ==
- Barbara Stanwyck as Sally Warren
- Robert Cummings as Jeff Warren
- Diana Lynn as Mary Lou Medford
- Patric Knowles as Lance Gale
- Robert Benchley as Uncle Tod
- Natalie Wood as Carol Warren

== Production ==
In May 1945 Paramount announced they would make the film with Stanwyck, Cummings and Knowles.

In June 1945 Cummings announced he would follow this film with Dishonorable Discharge from a story by John Farrow for Paramount.

== Reception ==
The New York Times wrote "The frivolous discords and disunions of elegant husbands and wives have so often been the subject matter of farces upon the screen that regular movie-goers must be pretty well numb to them by now. And that’s a help, for a state of anesthesia is the best one in which to partake of Paramount's latest in this genre, The Bride Wore Boots."

Variety called it "never as funnyas its makers intended."

Stanwyck's biographer called it "Barbara’s first outright boxoffice bomb since the mid-1930s."

== See also ==
- List of films about horses
- List of films about horse racing
