= Tommy Dix =

American baritone singer and actor (1923–2025)

- Born: Thomas Paine Navard; December 6, 1923; New York City, U.S.
- Died: January 15, 2025 (aged 101); Williamsburg, Virginia, U.S.
- Occupation(s): Singer, actor

Tommy Dix (born Thomas Paine Navard; December 6, 1923 – January 15, 2025) was an American baritone singer and actor. He started performing at the age of 11 in 1935. He attended Juilliard School at the age of 15.

== Career ==
Dix appeared in the Broadway play The Corn Is Green, which ran from 1941 to 1942. He had the male lead in the musical film, Best Foot Forward, where he played the young cadet, Bud Hooper, opposite Lucille Ball. He had previously played Chuck Green in the 1941 Broadway musical of the same name. He sang regularly at various clubs, including the Stage Door Canteen. He decided to retire from show business in the late 1940s to attend the University of Alabama, majoring in architectural engineering. He later worked in real estate and construction.

== Personal life and death ==
Dix was married to Margaret Ann Grayson in Alabama. They later divorced. He served in the Army during World War II.

Dix turned 100 in December 2023, and died in his sleep in Williamsburg, Virginia, on January 15, 2025, at the age of 101.
