= Charlie McCarthy, Detective =

1939 comedy film

- Directed by: Frank Tuttle
- Written by: Darrell Ware; Robertson White
- Produced by: Jerry Sackheim; Frank Tuttle
- Starring: Edgar Bergen; Robert Cummings; Constance Moore
- Cinematography: George Robinson
- Edited by: Bernard W. Burton
- Music by: Frank Skinner
- Production company: Universal Pictures
- Distributed by: Universal Pictures
- Release date: December 22, 1939
- Running time: 75 minutes
- Country: United States
- Language: English
- Budget: over $363,000.

Charlie McCarthy, Detective is a 1939 American comedy film starring Edgar Bergen, Charlie McCarthy and Robert Cummings.

== Plot ==
Scotty Hamilton is a reporter who works for a crooked editor. Bill Banning is another reporter who is about to expose the editor's ties to the mob. When the editor is killed, both reporter Banning and mobster Tony Garcia are suspected. However, Hamilton's friend Edgar Bergen solves the case (without much help from Charlie McCarthy).

== Cast ==
- Edgar Bergen - Himself, Charlie McCarthy and Mortimer Snerd
- Robert Cummings - Scotty Hamilton
- Constance Moore - Sheila Stewart
- Louis Calhern - Arthur Aldrich
- Edgar Kennedy - Inspector Dailey
- Samuel S. Hinds - Court Aldrich
- Harold Huber - Tony Garcia
- Warren Hymer - Dutch
- Ray Turner - Harrison 'Gravy' Randolph
- John Sutton - Bill Banning

=== Uncredited ===
- Stanley Andrews - Freight Captain
- Granville Bates - Judge Black
- G. Pat Collins - McNeil
- Alec Craig - Bounds
- Eddie Dunn - Officer Walsh
- Bess Flowers - Mrs. Aldrich & Party Guest
- Robert Greig - 2nd Buther
- Anne Gwynne - Miss Larkin, Charlie's Nurse
- John Harmon - Harry
- Grace Hayle - Fat Woman
- Al Hill - Detective
- Charles Irwin - Drunk
- Charles Lane - Charlie's Doctor
- Frances Morris - Miss Nelson
- Frances Robinson - Court Stenographer
- William Ruhl - Doctor
- Dick Rush - Detective
- Konstantin Shayne - Headwaiter
- Milburn Stone - Joe Felton
- Charles Sullivan - Policeman
- Anthony Warde - Photographer
- Claire Whitney - Maid
- Charles Williams - Peters

== Production ==
The film was announced in June 1938. It was the second movie Bergen made for Universal following Letter of Introduction. Bob Cummings was assigned in October 1939.

Filming took place from November to December 1939.

== Reception ==
The New York Times called it "a nondescript omlette". Variety wrote "whatever box office reaction" the film "is able to generate depends on the ability of Edgar Bergen and his wooden stooge to carry this inadequate script and inept direction. Picture will have to struggle as top half of the dualers. It won't assist the screen progress of Bergen and his pal."
