= Robert Cummings =

American actor (1910–1990)

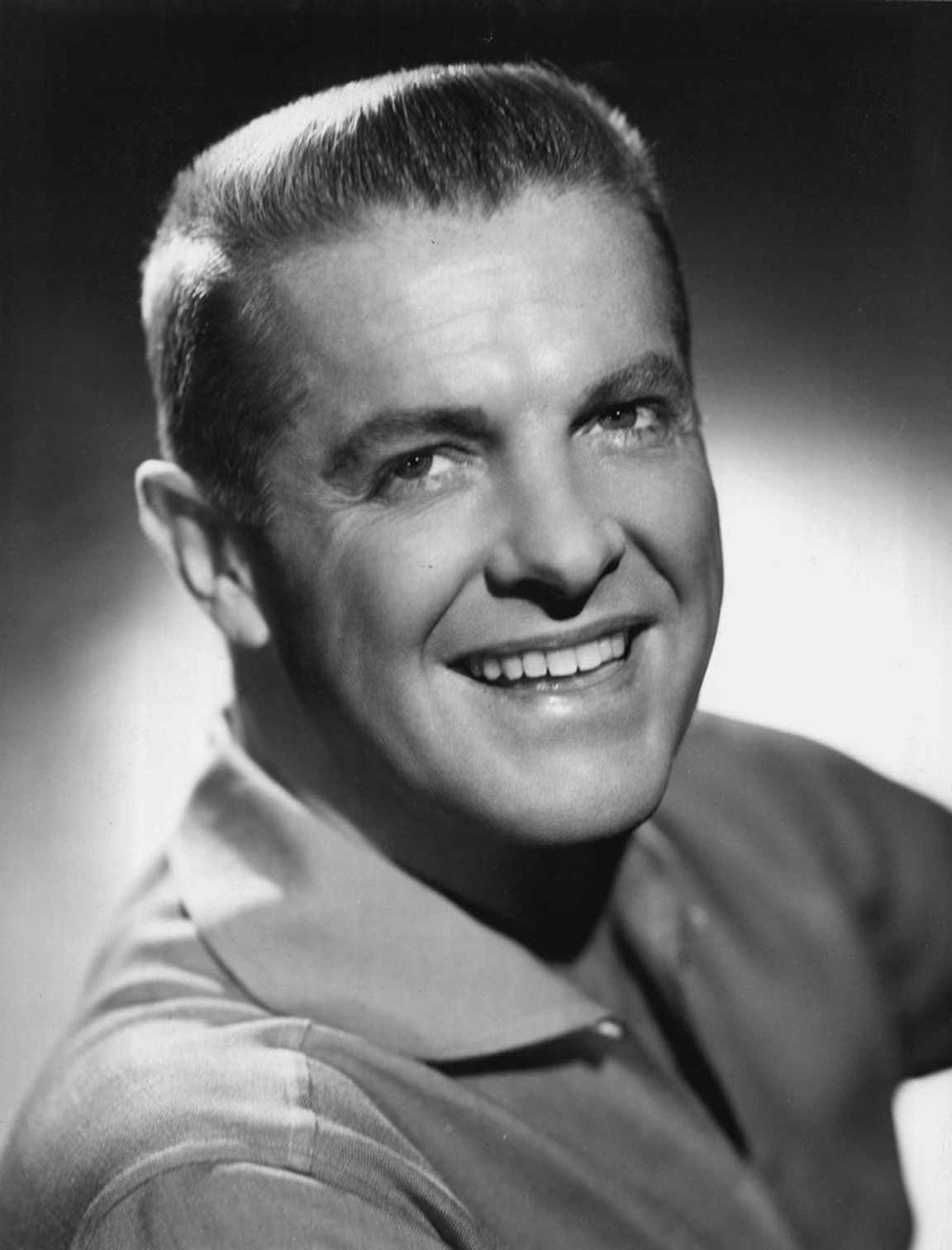
- Cummings in 1956
- Born: Charles Clarence Robert Orville Cummings; June 9, 1910; Joplin, Missouri U.S.
- Died: December 2, 1990 (aged 80); Los Angeles, California, U.S.
- Resting place: Forest Lawn Memorial Park
- Other names: Bob Cummings; Blade Stanhope Conway; Bryce Hutchens
- Education: American Academy of Dramatic Arts
- Occupation: Actor
- Years active: 1931–1990
- Political party: Republican
- Spouses: Emma Myers (m. 1931; div. 1933); Vivi Janiss (m. 1935; div. 1943); Mary Elliott (m. 1945; div. 1970); Regina Fong (m. 1971; div. 1987); Martha Burzynski (m. 1989)
- Children: 7

Charles Clarence Robert Orville Cummings (June 9, 1910 – December 2, 1990) was an American film and television actor who appeared in roles in comedy films such as The Devil and Miss Jones (1941) and Princess O'Rourke (1943), and in dramatic films, especially two of Alfred Hitchcock's thrillers, Saboteur (1942) and Dial M for Murder (1954). He received five Primetime Emmy Award nominations, and won the Primetime Emmy Award for Best Actor in a Single Performance in 1955. On February 8, 1960, he received two stars on the Hollywood Walk of Fame for his contributions to the motion picture and television industries, at 6816 Hollywood Boulevard and 1718 Vine Street. He used the stage name Robert Cummings from mid-1935 until the end of 1954 and was credited as Bob Cummings from 1955 until his death.

== Early life ==
Cummings was born in Joplin, Missouri, a son of Dr. Charles Clarence Cummings and the former Ruth Annabelle Kraft. His father was a surgeon, part of the original medical staff of St. John's Hospital in Joplin, and the founder of the Jasper County Tuberculosis Hospital in Webb City, Missouri. Cummings's mother was an ordained minister of the Science of Mind.

While attending Joplin High School, Cummings learned to fly. His first solo flight was on March 3, 1927. Some reports of his learning to fly refer to Orville Wright, the aviation pioneer, as being his godfather and flight instructor. However, these reports appear to be based on either media interviews of Cummings or other anecdotal references. There is no historical record of Orville Wright having traveled to Joplin, Missouri, either around the time of the gestation or the birth of Cummings, or during 1927, the year Cummings learned to fly. Cummings, born in 1910, would have been only 8 years old when Orville Wright had essentially stopped flying on May 13, 1918, as a result of injuries he sustained in an accident at Fort Myer, Virginia, on September 17, 1908. The report that Orville Wright taught Cummings to fly is also contradicted by Cummings's interview reported in the March 1960 Flying magazine. In the interview, Cummings described how he learned to fly "by trial and error, mostly error" during 3 hours of instruction from a Joplin, Missouri, plumber named Cooper before he soloed on March 3, 1927. During high school, Cummings gave Joplin residents rides in his aircraft for $5 per person.

When the government began licensing flight instructors, Cummings was issued flight instructor certificate No. 1, making him the first official flight instructor in the United States.

=== Education ===
Cummings studied briefly at Drury College in Springfield, Missouri, but his love of flying caused him to transfer to the Carnegie Institute of Technology in Pittsburgh. He studied aeronautical engineering for a year before he dropped out for financial reasons, his family having lost heavily in the 1929 stock market crash.

Cummings became interested in acting while performing in plays at Carnegie Tech, and decided to pursue it as a career. Since the American Academy of Dramatic Arts in New York City paid its male actors $14 a week, Cummings decided to study there. He stayed only one season, but later said he learned "three basic principles of acting. The first – never anticipate; second – take pride in my profession. And third – trust in God. And that last is said in reverence."

== Career ==
=== Blade Stanhope Conway ===
Cummings started looking for work in 1930, but couldn't find any roles, forcing him to get a job at a theatrical agency. Realizing that, at the time, "three quarters of Broadway plays were from England" and that English accents and actors were in demand, Cummings decided to cash in an insurance policy and buy a round-trip ticket there.

He was driving a motorbike through the countryside, picking up the accent and learning about the country, when his bike broke down at Harrogate. While waiting for repairs, he devised a plan. He invented the name "Blade Stanhope Conway" and bribed the janitor of a local theatre to put on the marquee: "Blade Stanhope Conway in Candida". He then had a photo taken of himself in front of the marquee and had 80 prints made. In London, he outfitted himself with a new wardrobe, composed a letter introducing the actor-author-manager-director "Blade" of Harrogate Repertory Theatre, and sent it off to 80 New York theatrical agents and producers.

As a result, when Cummings returned to New York, he was able to obtain several meetings.

One of the producers to whom he sent letters, Charles Hopkings, cast him in a production of The Roof by John Galsworthy, playing the role of the Hon. Reggie Fanning. Also in the cast was Henry Hull. The play ran from October to November 1931 and Brooks Atkinson of The New York Times listed "Conway" among the cast who provided "some excellent bits of acting".

In November 1932, "Conway" replaced Edwin Styles in the Broadway revue Earl Carroll's Vanities after studying song and dance by correspondence course.

Cummings later encouraged an old drama-school classmate, Margaret Kies, to use a similar deception – she became the "British" Margaret Lindsay. He later said pretending to be Conway broke up his marriage to Emma Myers, a girl from Joplin. "She couldn't stand me."

He was an extra in the Laurel and Hardy comedy Sons of the Desert (1933) and in the Vitaphone musical short Seasoned Greetings (1933).

=== Bryce Hutchens ===
Cummings decided to change his approach, when in the words of one report, "suddenly the bottom dropped out of the John Bull market; almost overnight, demand switched from Londoners to lassoers."

In 1934, Cummings changed his name to "Bryce Hutchens". He appeared under this name in the Ziegfeld Follies of 1934, which ran from January to June in 1934. He had a duet with Vivi Janiss, a native of Nebraska, with whom he sang "I Like the Likes of You". Cummings and Janiss went with the show when it went on tour after the Broadway run, and they married toward the end of the tour.

=== Paramount ===
The tour of Ziegfeld ended in Los Angeles in January 1935. Cummings enjoyed the city and wanted to move there. He returned to New York, then heard King Vidor was looking for Texan actors for So Red the Rose (1935). Cummings auditioned, pretending to be a Texan, having acquired his own version of a Texan accent by listening to cowboy bands on the radio. His ruse was exposed, but Vidor nevertheless cast Cummings under his actual name. In their review, The New York Times said that Cummings "does a fine bit" and "has the only convincing accent in the whole film."

He followed this with a part in Paramount's The Virginia Judge (1935). In July, the studio signed Cummings to a long-term contract. Before his first two Paramount films were released, he was also cast in a supporting role in Millions in the Air (1935).

Paramount was then remaking old Zane Grey silent westerns for the talking screen, with new scripts and performers. Robert Cummings appeared as one of the leads in the westerns Desert Gold (1936) and Arizona Mahoney (1936). He then had a supporting role in Forgotten Faces (1936) and a starring role in Three Cheers for Love (1936). He also appeared in:

Border Flight (1936)
Hollywood Boulevard (1936)
The Accusing Finger (1936)
Hideaway Girl (1936)
The Last Train from Madrid (1937).

Most of these were B pictures. He had a small role in an A picture, Souls at Sea (1937), then appeared in Sophie Lang Goes West (1937), Wells Fargo (1937) and College Swing (1938). He had a small role in You and Me (1938) (directed by Fritz Lang), and was in The Texans (1938) and Touchdown, Army (1938).

Eventually, Paramount dropped their option on him. "I was poison", he said. "No agent would look at me." In June, Paramount announced he would return for King of Chinatown with Anna May Wong, but he does not appear in the final film. In September he was cast at Republic, playing the lead in the crime movie I Stand Accused (1938). Cummings said it was "...a fluke hit—so at least I could get inside the casting agents again."

=== Universal ===
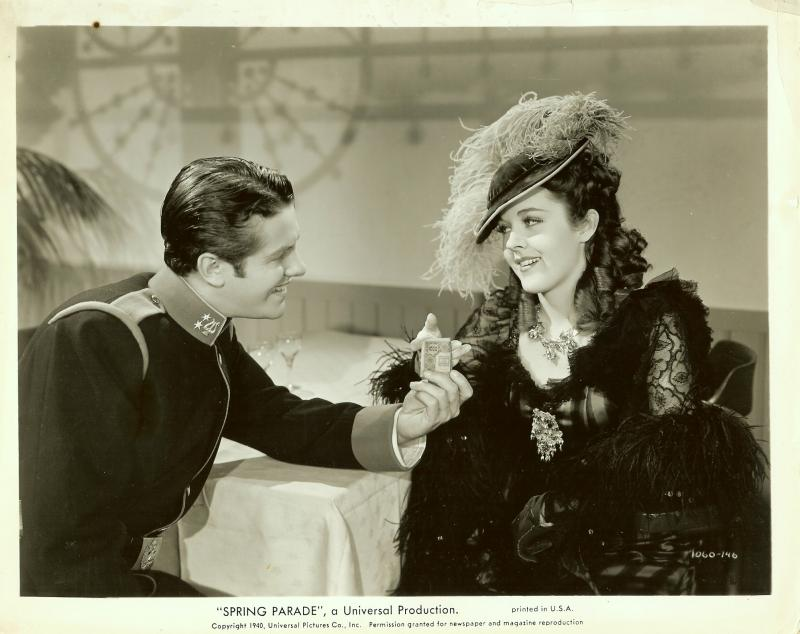
Cummings and Peggy Moran, Spring Parade (1940)

In November 1938, Cummings auditioned for the romantic lead in Three Smart Girls Grow Up (1939), starring Deanna Durbin, for producer Joe Pasternak. Pasternak was reluctant to cast him, preferring to find a musician, but Cummings told him, "I could fake it". He later said, "I'd had a lot of experience faking things harder than that. He let me try it and he signed me up."

On 21 November Universal gave Cummings an option on a seven-year contract starting at $600 a week, going up to $750 a week the following year, then ultimately up to $3,000 a week. His first film for them, Three Smart Girls Grow Up (1939) was a big success, and in March 1939 Universal took up their options on the actor. The film was directed by Henry Koster, who called Cummings "brilliant, wonderful... I made five pictures with him. I thought he was the best leading man I ever worked with. He had that marvelous comedy talent and also a romantic quality." Reviewing the film, Frank S. Nugent of The New York Times said Cummings "displays a really astonishing talent for light comedy—we never should have suspected it from his other pictures." Filmink wrote "Cummings found himself as an actor" with this movie.

Pasternak used him again, as the juvenile lead in The Under-Pup (1939). Although it was the first film to give Robert Cummings billing above the film title, The Under-Pup was actually a showcase for the studio's newest singing star, Gloria Jean. Although Cummings did well in the light-comedy role, the trade columnists and reporters concentrated on Gloria Jean, overshadowing Cummings. Universal announced that the Under-Pup cast, including Cummings, would be reunited in a sequel, Straight from the Heart, but the project was canceled when producer Pasternak left the studio. The follow-up, with Robert Stack standing in for Cummings, was A Little Bit of Heaven (1940).

In August 1939 Columbia wanted Cummings for the lead in Golden Boy, but could not come to terms with Universal; the role went instead to screen newcomer William Holden. Cummings supported Basil Rathbone and Victor McLaglen in Rio (1939), then was borrowed by 20th Century-Fox to romance Sonia Henie in Everything Happens at Night (1939). At Universal he had a key role in Charlie McCarthy, Detective (1939), then was borrowed by MGM to play the lead in a B movie with Laraine Day, And One Was Beautiful (1940). Back at Universal, Cummings was the romantic male lead in a comedy, Private Affairs (1940); then he romanced Durbin again in Spring Parade (1940). Cummings made his mark in the CBS Radio network's dramatic serial titled Those We Love, which ran from 1938 to 1945. He also played the role of David Adair in the serial drama Those We Love, opposite Richard Cromwell, Francis X. Bushman and Nan Grey.

==== A series of classic films ====
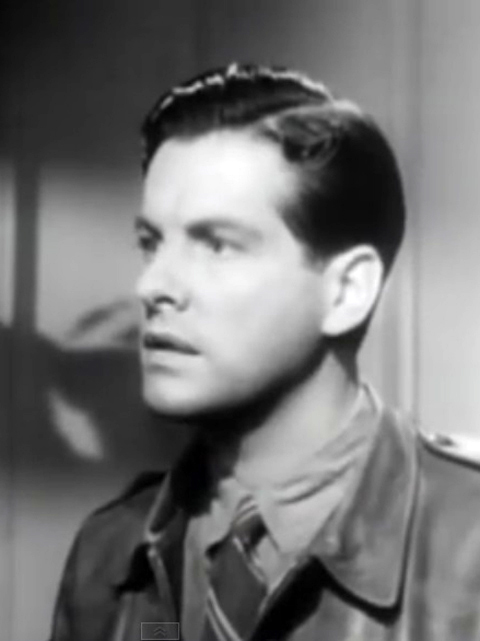
Saboteur, 1942

Cummings and Allan Jones were cast as the comic leads in the film One Night in the Tropics (1940), but they were overshadowed by the performances (as supporting actors, in their first film) of Abbott and Costello.

MGM borrowed Cummings a second time, to play opposite Ruth Hussey in Free and Easy (1941). In the same period, he was borrowed by a company established by Norman Krasna and Frank Ross, who were making a comedy from a script by Krasna for release through RKO: The Devil and Miss Jones (1941). Cummings played a union leader, Jean Arthur's love interest, under the direction of Sam Wood. Cummings shot the film at the same time as Free and Easy. Free and Easy lost money for MGM, but Devil and Miss Jones was a critical and commercial success. 20th Century Fox borrowed him for Moon Over Miami (1941), starring Don Ameche and Betty Grable; Fox was willing to postpone the film so Cummings could finish Devil and Miss Jones.

In January 1941 Louella Parsons wrote, "Is that boy going places in 1941. From the looks of things it's a Cummings year – because all his troubles with Universal are ironed out and almost every studio in town wants to borrow him." Back at Universal, Pasternak used Cummings as the romantic male lead in It Started with Eve (1941), from a script by Krasna opposite Deanna Durbin and Charles Laughton. Meanwhile, Sam Wood was directing an adaptation of the novel Kings Row (1942) over at Warner Bros, where the head of production was Hal Wallis. Wallis did not have any contract players at Warner Bros who were considered ideal for the role of Paris, and after trying desperately to get Tyrone Power, he tried to borrow Cummings, who had done an impressive screen test. However, Cummings was busy on It Started with Eve and the actor had to drop out. Then the schedule was rearranged and Cummings was able to make both films. Production of Kings Row did have to be suspended for a week so Cummings could return to Universal to do reshoots for Eve. Both films were huge successes. Hal Wallis said Cummings "was actually too old for the part" in Kings Row "not quite right, but he was helped considerably by an extraordinary support cast."

Back at Universal, Cummings starred in the Alfred Hitchcock spy thriller Saboteur (1942), made at Universal, with Priscilla Lane and Norman Lloyd. He played Barry Kane, an aircraft worker wrongfully accused of espionage, trying to clear his name. In December 1941, John Chapman said Cummings was among "the most sought-after leading men in town" and was one of his "stars for 1942". Filmink wrote "Few male actors had a hot streak like Robert Cummings from 1941 to 1942: The Devil and Miss Jones, It Started with Eve, Kings Row and Saboteur are all stone-cold classics, and he made crucial contributions to all."

Universal announced Cummings for Boy Meets Baby with Deanna Durbin, which became Between Us Girls (1942) with Diana Barrymore. He filmed it concurrently with a Hal Wallis movie at Warner Bros titled Princess O'Rourke (made 1942, released 1943), Norman Krasna's directorial debut. Cummings was meant to be in We've Never Been Licked (1943) for Walter Wanger at Universal, but did not appear in the film.

==== World War II ====
In December 1941, Cummings joined the fledgling Civil Air Patrol, an organization of citizens and pilots interested in helping support the U.S. war effort. In February 1942, he helped establish Squadron 918-4 located in Glendale, California, at the Grand Central Air Terminal, becoming its first commanding officer. Two weeks later, he and other members of the squadron went in search of the Japanese submarine that had attacked the oil refinery at Goleta, California. During the war, Cummings participated in search and rescue missions, courier missions, and border and forestry patrols around the Western United States. For this work he used his own aircraft, Spinach I, a 1936 Porterfield, and Spinach II, a Cessna 165 Airmaster. The squadron he established still operates as San Fernando Senior Squadron 35 and is based at Whiteman Airport in Pacoima, Los Angeles. In November 1942, Cummings joined the United States Army Air Forces. During World War II, he served as a flight instructor. After the war, Cummings served as a pilot in the United States Air Force Reserve, where he achieved the rank of captain. Cummings played aircraft pilots in several of his postwar film roles. During the war service, he had small roles in the all-star Forever and a Day (1943) and Flesh and Fantasy (1943), but he was effectively off screen for two years.

==== Suspension from Universal ====
Cummings was meant to be in Fired Wife with Teresa Wright, Charles Coburn, and Eddie Anderson and a director "comparable with" Leo McCarey. However, when he found out these actors would not be in the film, and the director would be Charles Lamont, he refused to be in it. (Filming began in April 1943 with Robert Paige taking Cummings's role.) Universal put him on suspension for five weeks, refused to give him a new part, or pay his weekly salary of $1,500 after the suspension had been lifted. Cummings notified the studio in May 1943 that he considered himself no longer under contract. In September 1943, Cummings sued the studio for withheld wages of $10,700, also arguing that for some time, Universal tried to put him in minor roles to "run him ragged" and "to teach him a lesson". In March 1944, the court ruled in Cummings's favor, saying Universal had voided its contract with the actor and owed him $10,700. This decision happened in the same fortnight as another court case involving Olivia de Havilland, which also ruled in the actor's favor.

=== Freelance star ===
==== Hal Wallis ====
Cummings was considered free of Universal effective August 1944. In January he signed a four-year exclusive contract with Hal Wallis, who had left Warner Brothers to become an independent producer. Shortly after, he took leave from the Air Force to star in You Came Along (1945) for Hal Wallis, directed by John Farrow with a screenplay by Ayn Rand. The Army Air Forces pilot Cummings played, Bob Collins, died off camera, but was resurrected 10 years later for Cummings's television show. Cummings was under contract to Wallis for four years. Also for Wallis—who had now moved to Paramount—he did The Bride Wore Boots (1946), a comedy with Barbara Stanwyck. He was announced for Dishonorable Discharge for Wallis from a story by John Farrow, but it appears to have not been made. Neither was Its Love Love Love, which was announced by RKO, or Dream Puss, which Wallis announced for Cummings at Paramount.

In 1946, Cummings said, "Often I play the boyfriend of a girl young enough to be my daughter. I'm 36, and whenever I start drooping, I run one of my pictures and feel like a kid again." Around this time, he also said he was more interested in producing and directing, and hoped to act in only one film per year.

==== United California Productions ====
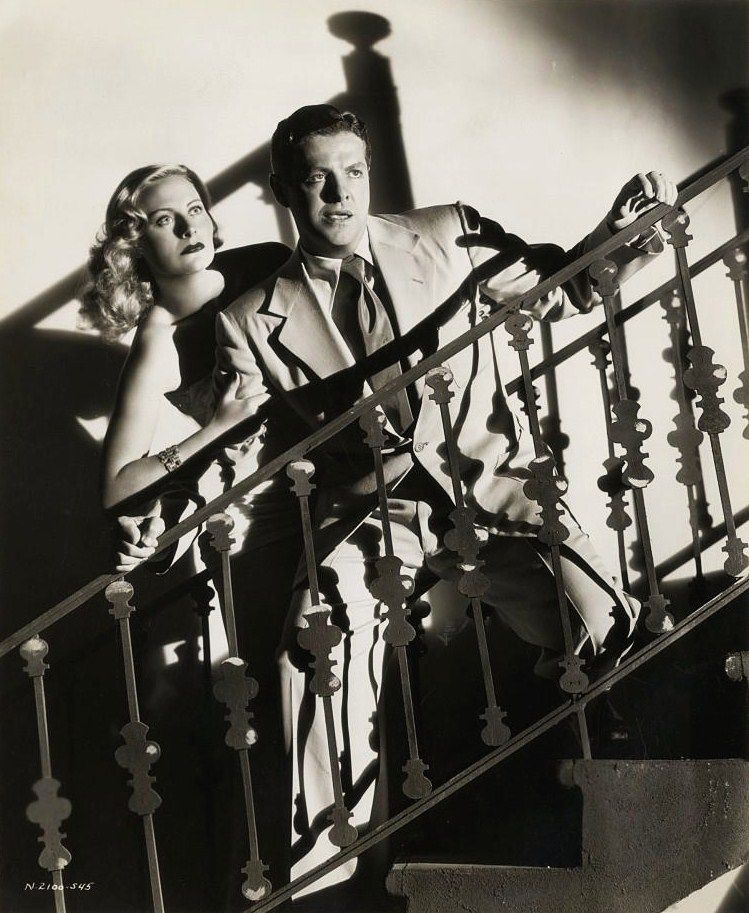
With Michèle Morgan in The Chase (1946)

Cummings had the leads in two films for Nero Films, a production company run by Seymour Nebenzal and Eugene Frenke, who released through United Artists: a film noir, The Chase (1946); and a Western, Heaven Only Knows (1947).

Cummings decided to form his own production company with Frenke and Philip Yordan, which they called United California. (They originally called it United World, but it was too similar to another company's name.) In December 1946, it was announced that Cummings had signed an exclusive contract with United California Productions, and that his deal with Wallis was for one film a year for seven years. They announced Bad Guy from a script by Yordan. They were also going to do Joe MacBeth (which was ultimately made by others).

In 1947, Cummings had reportedly earned $110,000 in the preceding 12 months. The Lost Moment (1947) with Susan Hayward was a film noir for Walter Wanger at Universal based on The Aspern Papers by Henry James. It was a resounding flop at the box office. Cummings was initially meant to follow it with The Big Curtain for Edward Alperson at Fox but that picture was never produced.

Cummings appeared in Sleep, My Love (1948), another noir, directed by Douglas Sirk and produced by Mary Pickford.

United California eventually brought in manufacturer Frank Hale as partner. Its first film, Let's Live a Little (1948), was a romantic comedy with Hedy Lamarr, released through United Artists.

Cummings announced a series of projects for United California: Ho the Fair Wind from a novel by IAR Wylie, The Glass Heart by Mary Holland, Poisonous Paradise (a docudrama for which some footage had been shot called Jungle), Passport to Love by Howard Irving Young, and a remake of Two Hearts in Three Quarter Time. Cummings was also trying to interest Norman Krasna into writing the story of how Cummings broke into acting, to be called Pardon My Accent.

Cummings did the melodrama The Accused (1949) for Hal Wallis at Paramount, supporting Loretta Young.

Reign of Terror (1949) was a thriller set in the French Revolution for director Anthony Mann; Eagle Lion co-produced with United California.

Cummings did a comedy at Universal, Free for All (1949).

==== Columbia ====
In July 1949, Cummings signed a three-picture deal with Columbia. He made Tell It to the Judge (1949), with Rosalind Russell, for them. He did one for Wallis at Paramount, Paid in Full (1950) (originally Bitter Victory), then went back to Columbia for The Petty Girl (1950) a musical with Joan Caulfield.

Cummings did announce he would make The Glass Heart for his own company and release through Columbia, but this did not happen.

Cummings supported Clifton Webb in For Heaven's Sake (1950) at Fox, then played a con man in The Barefoot Mailman (1950), his third film for Columbia.

Cummings began working in television, appearing in Sure as Fate ("Run from the Sun") and Somerset Maugham TV Theatre ("The Luncheon").

He was in a Broadway play Faithfully Yours (originally The Philemon Complex), which had a short run in late 1951. In November 1951 he announced he only had one more Columbia commitment and was open to doing more theatre.

At Columbia, he was in The First Time (1952), the first feature directed by Frank Tashlin. On TV, he was in Lux Video Theatre ("The Shiny People", "Pattern for Glory"), Betty Crocker Star Matinee ("Sense of Humor"), and Robert Montgomery Presents ("Lila My Love").

Cummings was one of the four stars featured in the short-run radio version of Four Star Playhouse.

He was offered Battle in Spain, the story of El Cid, with Linda Darnell, but turned it down because it was too controversial.

=== Television star ===
==== My Hero ====
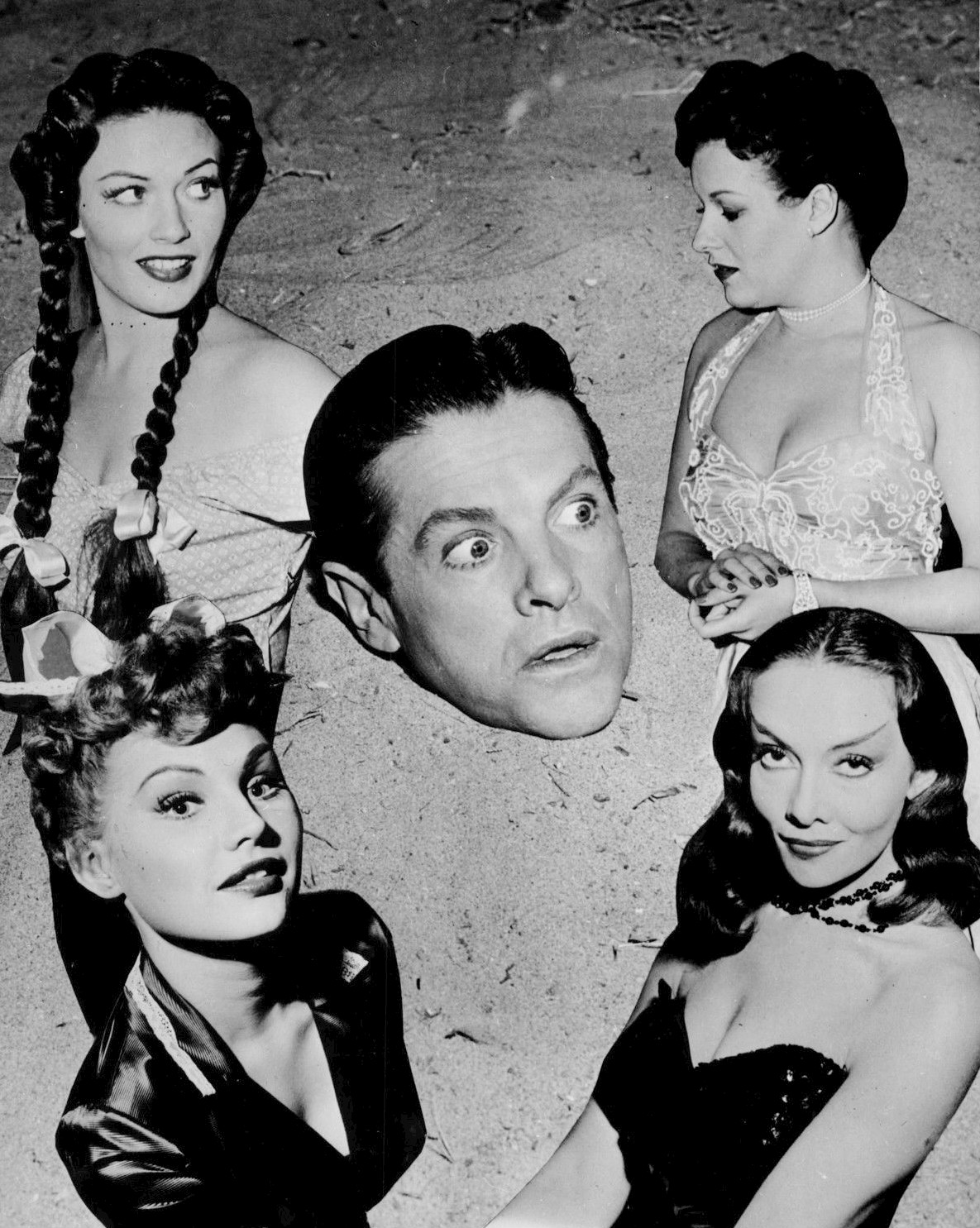
Publicity photo for My Hero (1952–53)

Cummings starred in his first regular television series in the comedy My Hero (1952–53), playing a bumbling real estate salesman. He also wrote and directed some episodes. The series ran for 33 episodes before (it was reported) Cummings decided to end it and accept other offers. In reality, the show had been axed. "After it was dropped, I was as dead as you could possibly get in show business" said Cummings. "I sat in my agent's office one day and heard a top producer tell him on the phone that nobody would buy me." Out of work, he accepted the State Department's invitation to go on a goodwill mission to Argentina. The show earned him an Emmy nomination.

Cummings was in Marry Me Again (1953) at RKO for Tashlin, then went to England to star in another Hitchcock film, Dial M for Murder (1954), playing the lover of Grace Kelly, whose husband Ray Milland tries to kill her. The film was a hit.

Cummings then supported Doris Day in a musical at Warner Bros, Lucky Me (1954).

He was chosen by producer John Wayne as his co-star to play airline pilot Captain Sullivan in The High and the Mighty, partly due to Cummings's flying experience; however, director William A. Wellman overruled Wayne and hired Robert Stack for the part.

==== Twelve Angry Men ====
In 1954, Cummings appeared in Twelve Angry Men, an original TV play for Westinghouse Studio One written by Reginald Rose and directed by Franklin Schaffner, alongside actors including Franchot Tone and Edward Arnold. Cummings played Juror Number Eight, the role taken by Henry Fonda in the feature-film adaptation. Cummings's performance earned him the 1955 Emmy Award for Best Actor in a Single Performance.

Other television appearances included Campbell Summer Soundstage ("The Test Case"), Justice ("The Crisis"), The Elgin Hour ("Floodtide"), and a TV version of Best Foot Forward (1954).

==== Laurel Productions and The Bob Cummings Show ====
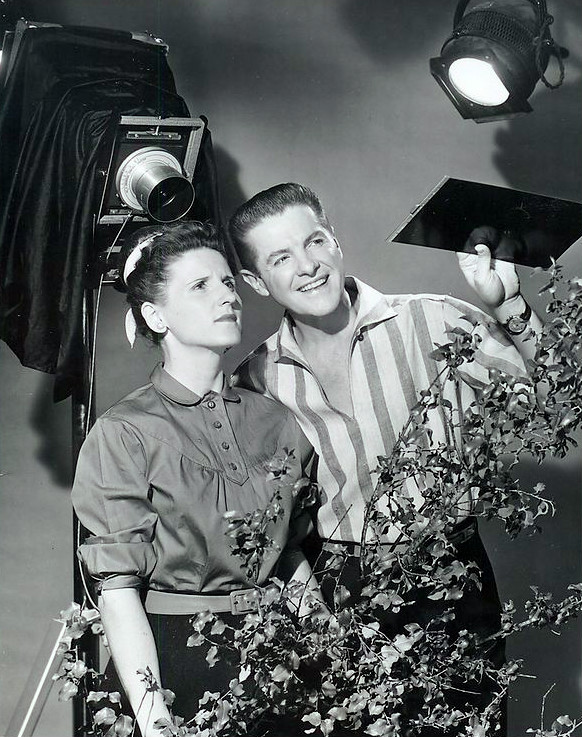
Ann B. Davis and Cummings in The Bob Cummings Show (rerun as Love That Bob)

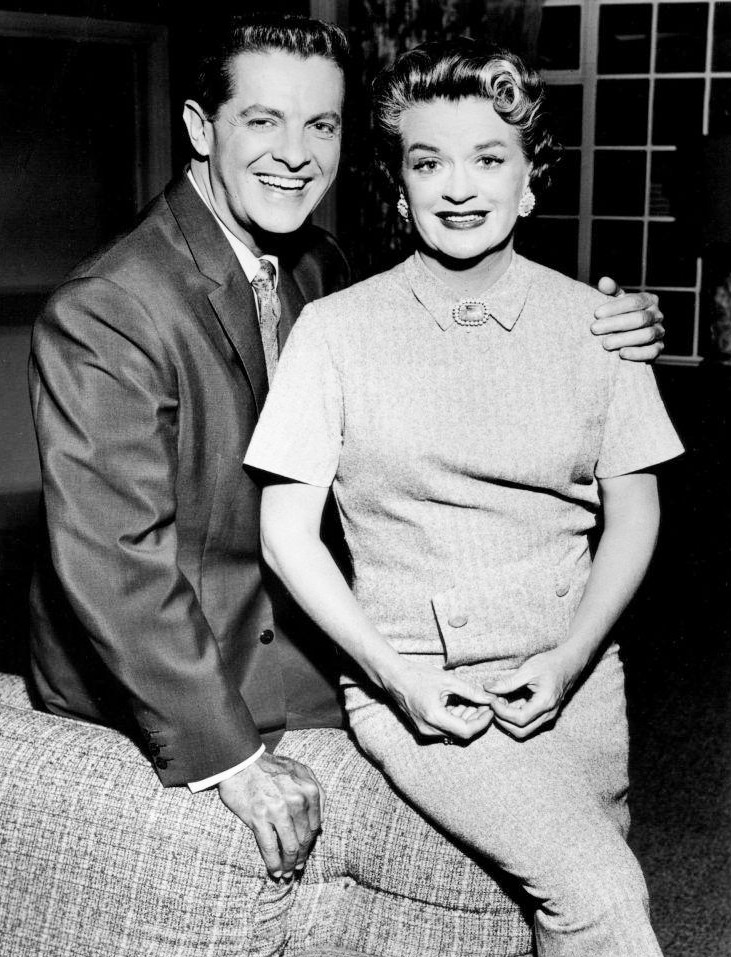
With Rosemary DeCamp in 1959 for The Bob Cummings Show

In July 1954, Cummings formed his own independent film production company, Laurel Productions, Incorporated. The company's name had several affiliations to Cummings: his youngest daughter was named Laurel Ann Cummings; the street he and his family lived on was named Laurel Way; his wife's grandmother's name was Laurel; and finally, the fact that Laurel & Hardy had given Cummings his film debut back in 1933. His wife Mary Elliott was appointed president of Laurel Productions. In July 1954, Cummings filmed the pilot for his television show, The Bob Cummings Show, and would go on to produce 173 episodes.

Cummings intended to produce a film titled The Damned through Laurel Productions, from a novel by John D. MacDonald and to be written and directed by Frank Tashlin. In December 1954, Cummings and George Burns formed Laurmac Productions, with the hope of co-producing a feature film in May 1955.

In January 1955, The Bob Cummings Show began airing, and went through 1959. Cummings starred on the successful NBC sitcom, The Bob Cummings Show (known as Love That Bob in reruns), where he played Bob Collins, a former World War II pilot who became a successful professional photographer. The character, a bachelor in 1950s Los Angeles, considered himself quite the ladies' man. The sitcom was noted for some very risqué humor for its time. Reviewing the show, Variety wrote "few video performers are as infectious as Bob Cummings" calling the sitcom "a combination of corn, slapstick and sex. If it took itself seriously, it'd bomb bigger than Bikini. But everybody acts as though he's improvising on a camp picnic."

A popular feature of the program was Cummings's portrayal of his elderly grandfather. His co-stars were Rosemary DeCamp as his sister Margaret MacDonald; Darryl Hickman as his nephew Chuck MacDonald; Lyle Talbot as his old Air Force buddy Paul Fonda, and Ann B. Davis, in her first television success, as his assistant Charmaine "Schultzy" Schultz.

When Cummings appeared on the NBC interview program Here's Hollywood, he was seen by Nunnally Johnson, who cast him opposite Betty Grable in How to Be Very, Very Popular (1955) at Fox, which turned out to be Grable's last film. Cummings's contract was amended to allow him time off to rehearse and record his TV show.

Around this time, Cummings said he had made 78 films, and "I always had the feeling I was distinguished for none of them. Hollywood's never been really hot about me. I was always second choice. I used to say to my wife Mary, 'Somebody's got to be sick someday – Bill Holden or maybe some boy not even born yet! I used to say 'If I could find another business where I could be successful!'."

Cummings was one of the hosts on ABC's live broadcast of the opening day of Disneyland on July 17, 1955, along with Ronald Reagan and Art Linkletter. On that day, Cummings played off his playboy character image by being “caught” embracing and kissing a young woman in a bonnet with a stricken look on her face.

Cummings's performance in The Bob Cummings Show earned him another Emmy nomination for Best Actor in a Continuous Role in 1956.

He turned down The Heavenly Twins for the Theatre Guild; and was mentioned for Bewitched by Charles Bennett in England, but did not do it.

During the series's production, Cummings still found time to play other roles. He returned to Studio One ("A Special Announcement"), and did episodes of General Electric Theater ("Too Good with a Gun"), The George Burns and Gracie Allen Show, and Schlitz Playhouse ("One Left Over", "Dual Control").

He was also in "Bomber's Moon" for Playhouse 90 (1958), from a Rod Serling script directed by John Frankenheimer, who said "Bobby's a really fine dramatic actor, but people usually associate him only with comedy. Naturally enough I suppose. Directing an actor like this who feels immediately what the script wants and what the director wants makes you love this business."

"It's a great life, acting", Cummings said in 1959. "I wouldn't have it any other way. I'm a completely content actor."

When his TV show ended in 1959, Cummings claimed it was his decision, as he was tired and wanted to take a year off. He was also keen to sell the show into syndication. "I don't think I'll do another comedy", he said. The show had been very lucrative for him.

In 1960, Cummings starred in "King Nine Will Not Return", the opening episode of the second season of CBS's The Twilight Zone, written by Serling and directed by Buzz Kulik.

He guested on Zane Grey Theatre ("The Last Bugle", directed by Budd Boetticher), The DuPont Show of the Week ("The Action in New Orleans"), The Dick Powell Theatre ("Last of the Private Eyes", co-starring Ronald Reagan), and The Great Adventure ("Plague").

==== The New Bob Cummings Show ====
The New Bob Cummings Show followed on CBS for one season, from 1961 to 1962. It was a variation of The Bob Cummings Show with Cummings as a pilot who had various adventures. It ran for 22 episodes before being cancelled.

Cummings returned to films with a supporting role in My Geisha (1962), written by Krasna. Variety called the actor "astonishingly youthful" and said "it's nice to see him back on the theatre screen."

He was top-billed in Beach Party (1963), although the film is better remembered today for first teaming Frankie Avalon and Annette Funicello. In its review of the film, Variety wrote "Cummings shows himself to be amenable farceur and notably at ease in surroundings which might embarrass a less professional star."

Cummings had supporting roles in two popular films, The Carpetbaggers (1964) with George Peppard and Alan Ladd and What a Way to Go! (1964) with Shirley MacLaine, and was in Theatre of Stars ("The Square Peg").

Also in 1964, he was a guest as a beauty pageant judge in The Beverly Hillbillies episode, "The Race for Queen".

==== My Living Doll ====
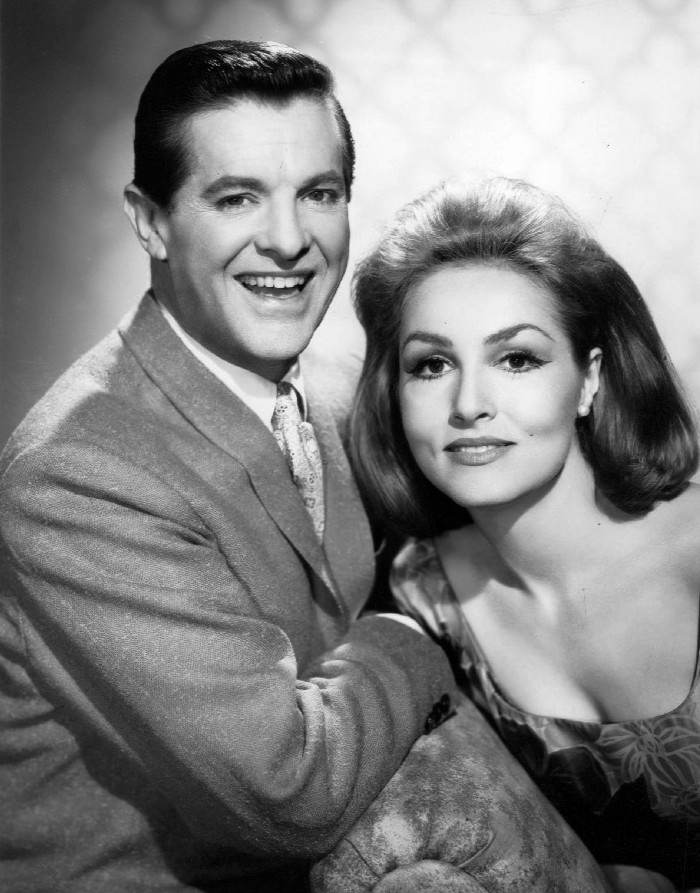
Robert Cummings and Julie Newmar in a publicity still for My Living Doll

In 1964–65, Cummings starred in another CBS sitcom, My Living Doll, co-starring Julie Newmar as Rhoda the robot and Jack Mullaney as his friend. After 21 episodes, Cummings asked to be written out of the show. It lasted five more episodes.

=== Later career ===
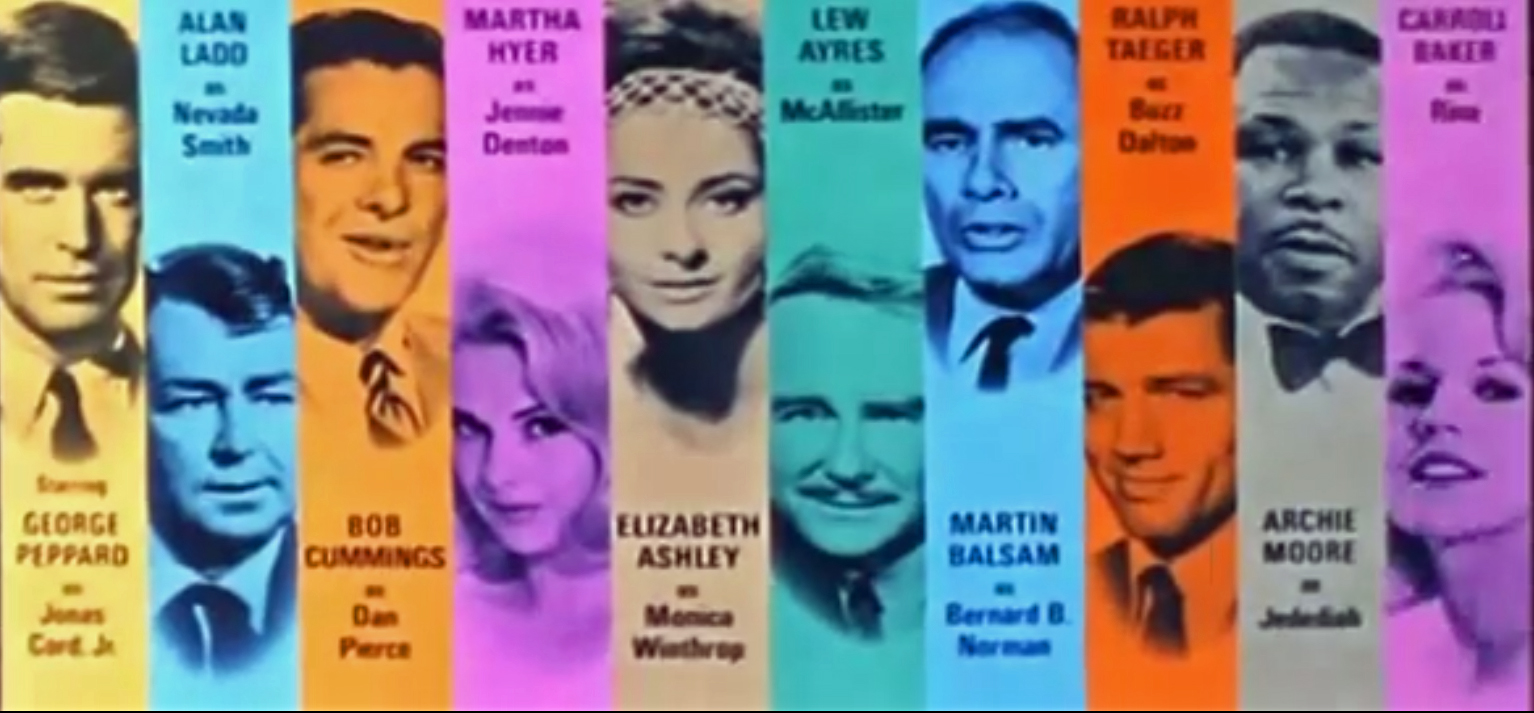
Trailer screenshot for The Carpetbaggers (1964)

In the late 1960s, Cummings had supporting roles in The Carpetbaggers (1964), Promise Her Anything (1966) and the remake of Stagecoach (1966) (playing the bank embezzler).

Cummings had the lead in Five Golden Dragons (1967) for producer Harry Alan Towers and supported in Gidget Grows Up (1969).

He was in another Broadway play, The Wayward Stork, which had a short run in early 1966. A review in The New York Times said Cummings "is not in top form. He sounded a bit hoarse and somewhat strained. Usually he is a quite acceptable, breezy farceur."

He guest-starred again on Theatre of Stars ("Blind Man's Bluff"), as well as The Flying Nun ("Speak the Speech, I Pray You"), Green Acres ("Rest and Relaxation"), Here Come the Brides ("The She-Bear"), Arnie ("Hello, Holly"), Bewitched ("Samantha and the Troll"), Here's Lucy ("Lucy's Punctured Romance", "Lucy and Her Genuine Twimby"), and several episodes of Love, American Style.

Cummings's last lead roles on film were in a pair of TV movies, The Great American Beauty Contest (1973) and Partners in Crime (1973).

During the 1970s for over 10 years, Cummings traveled the US performing in dinner theaters and short stints in plays while living in an Airstream travel trailer.

He relayed those experiences in the written introduction he provided for the book Airstream written by Robert Landau and James Phillippi in 1984.

Cummings had a cameo in Three on a Date (1978) and appeared in 1979 as Elliott Smith, the father of Fred Grandy's Gopher on ABC's The Love Boat.

In 1986, Cummings hosted the 15th-anniversary celebration of Walt Disney World on The Wonderful World of Disney.

In 1987, he said, "I wouldn't mind living until I'm 110. I still swim, do calisthenics, and keep fit. I've never been in hospital, except for a hernia operation at one time. People laugh about my using so many vitamins. When I tell them I take 50 liver pills a day, they look surprised, but whether they laugh or not, the thing works." He added, "I'm retired, I live on a pension" and "if I have a problem I get expert counsel, then ask the opinion of a good psychic."

Robert Cummings's last public appearance was on The Magical World of Disney episode "The Disneyland 35th Anniversary Special" in 1990.

== Personal life ==
=== Marriages ===
Cummings was married five times and fathered seven children. His first marriage was to Emma Myers, a girl from his hometown. His second marriage was to Vivi Janiss, an actress he met while performing in Ziegfeld Follies. His third wife, Mary Elliott, was a former actress, and she ran Cummings's business affairs. They separated in 1968 and had a bitter divorce, during the course of which she accused him of cheating on her with his former secretary Regina Fong and using methamphetamines which she said caused wild mood swings. She also claimed he relied on astrologers and numerologists to make financial decisions with "disastrous" consequences. In 1970, when the divorce was finalized, their communal property was estimated as being worth from $700,000 to $800,000 (equivalent to between $5.8 million and $6.6 million in 2025).

He was married to Regina Fong from 1971 to 1987 and married Martha Burzynski (1932-2017) two years later. He died the following year.

=== Hobbies ===
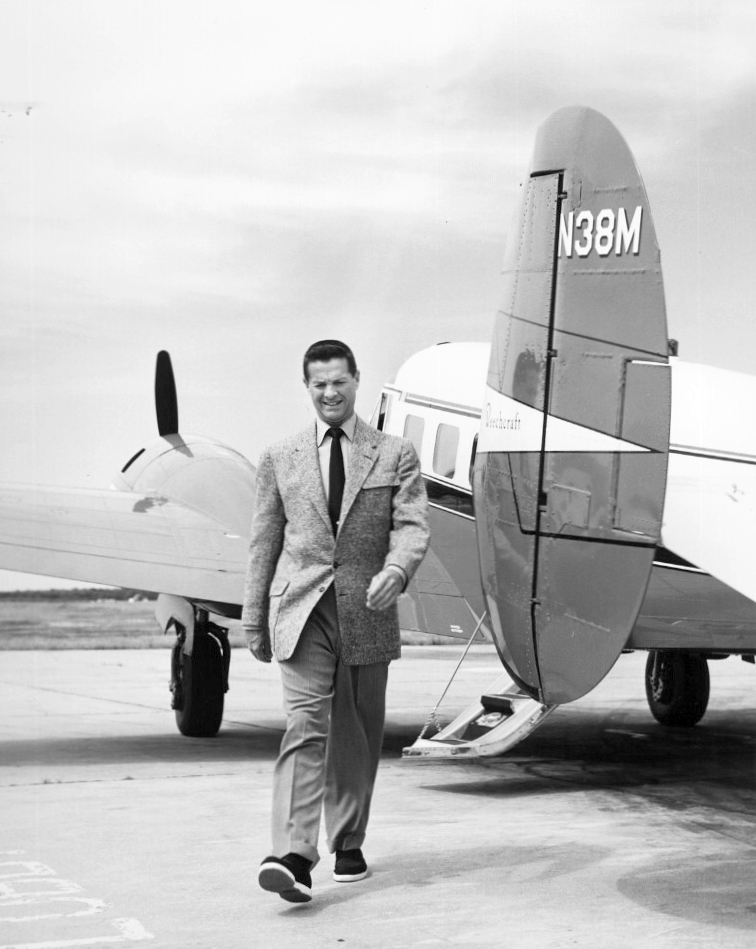
Cummings flew his Beechcraft to Joplin, Missouri—his hometown—in 1956

He was an avid pilot and owned a number of airplanes, all named "Spinach". He was a staunch advocate of natural foods and published a book on healthy living, Stay Young and Vital, in 1960.

=== Legal troubles ===
In May 1948 Hedda Hopper reported that there were four lawsuits against Cummings.

In 1952, Cummings was sued by a writer of My Hero who had been fired. In 1952, Cummings was served with papers concerning the suit by LA County Deputy Sheriff William Conroy; Cummings assaulted Conroy and was then sued by the sheriff for damages. Conroy stated that when he tried to serve Cummings with a subpoena the actor gunned the motor of his car and dragged him along the pavement. Cummings explained that he did not know Conroy was a deputy. Both cases were settled in 1954.

In 1972 he was charged with fraud for operating a pyramid scheme involving his company, Bob Cummings Inc, which sold vitamins and food supplements.

In 1975 he was arrested for being in possession of a blue box used to defraud the telephone company. He avoided trial under the double jeopardy rule.

=== Reported drug addiction ===
Despite his interest in health, Cummings was alleged to have been a methamphetamine addict from the mid-1950s until the end of his life. In 1954, while in New York to star in the Westinghouse Studio One production of Twelve Angry Men, Cummings began receiving injections from Max Jacobson, the notorious "Dr. Feelgood". His friends Rosemary Clooney and José Ferrer recommended the doctor to Cummings, who was complaining of a lack of energy. While Jacobson insisted that his injections contained only "vitamins, sheep sperm, and monkey gonads", they actually contained a substantial dose of methamphetamine.

Cummings allegedly continued to use a mixture provided by Jacobson, eventually becoming a patient of Jacobson's son Thomas, who was based in Los Angeles, and later injecting himself. The changes in Cummings's personality caused by the euphoria of the drug and subsequent depression damaged his career and led to an intervention by his friend, television host Art Linkletter. The intervention was not successful, and Cummings's drug abuse and subsequent career collapse were factors in his divorces from his third wife, Mary, and fourth wife, Gina Fong.

After Jacobson was forced out of business in the 1970s, Cummings developed his own drug connections based in The Bahamas. Suffering from Parkinson's disease, he was forced to move into homes for indigent older actors in Hollywood.

=== Children ===
Cummings had seven children. His son, Tony Cummings, played Rick Halloway in the NBC daytime serial Another World in the early 1980s.

=== Political affiliation ===
Cummings was a supporter of the Republican Party.

== Death ==
On December 2, 1990, Cummings died of kidney failure and complications from pneumonia at the Motion Picture & Television Country House and Hospital in Woodland Hills, California.

He is interred in the Great Mausoleum at Forest Lawn Cemetery in Glendale, California.

Filmink called Cummings's career "a triumphant success – he did it all: Broadway, Hollywood, Harry Alan Towers, Golden Years of Television, Hitchcock, Deanna Durbin… He just made one mistake – he got on drugs."

== Filmography ==
Year	Film	Role	Director	Notes
1933	Seasoned Greetings	Lita's Beau / Husband in Sunny Weather Number		Short; uncredited
1933	Sons of the Desert	"Blade Stanhope Conway"	William A. Seiter	credited as "Blade Stanhope Conway"
1935	So Red the Rose	George Pendleton	King Vidor	
1935	The Virginia Judge	Jim Preston	Edward Sedgwick	
1935	Millions in the Air	Jimmy	Ray McCarey	
1936	Desert Gold	Fordyce 'Ford' Mortimer	James P. Hogan	
1936	Forgotten Faces	Clinton Faraday	E.A. Dupont	
1936	Border Flight	Lt. Bob Dixon	Otho Lovering	
1936	Three Cheers for Love	Jimmy Tuttle	Ray McCarey	
1936	Hollywood Boulevard	Jay Wallace	Robert Florey	
1936	The Accusing Finger	Jimmy Ellis	James P. Hogan	
1936	Hideaway Girl	Mike Winslow	George Archainbaud	
1936	Arizona Mahoney	Phillip Randall	James P. Hogan	
1937	The Last Train from Madrid	Juan Ramos	James P. Hogan	
1937	Souls at Sea	George Martin	Henry Hathaway	
1937	Sophie Lang Goes West	Curley Griffin	Charles Reisner	
1937	Wells Fargo	Prospector	Frank Lloyd	
1938	College Swing	Radio Announcer	Raoul Walsh	
1938	You and Me	Jim	Fritz Lang	
1938	The Texans	Alan Sanford	James P. Hogan	
1938	Touchdown, Army	Cadet Jimmy Howal	Kurt Neumann	
1938	I Stand Accused	Frederick A. Davis	John H. Auer	
1939	Three Smart Girls Grow Up	Harry Loren	Henry Koster	
1939	The Under-Pup	Dennis King	Richard Wallace	
1939	Rio	Bill Gregory	John Brahm	
1939	Everything Happens at Night	Ken Morgan	Irving Cummings	
1939	Charlie McCarthy, Detective	Scotty Hamilton	Frank Tuttle	
1940	And One Was Beautiful	Ridley Crane	Robert B. Sinclair	
1940	Private Affairs	Jimmy Nolan	Albert S. Rogell	
1940	Spring Parade	Corporal Harry Marten	Henry Koster	
1940	One Night in the Tropics	Steve Harper	A. Edward Sutherland	
1941	Free and Easy	Max Clemington	Edward Buzzell (uncredited)	
1941	The Devil and Miss Jones	Joe	Sam Wood	
1941	Moon Over Miami	Jeffrey Boulton	Walter Lang	
1941	It Started with Eve	Jonathan 'Johnny' Reynolds Jr.	Henry Koster	
1942	Kings Row	Parris Mitchell	Sam Wood	
1942	Saboteur	Barry Kane	Alfred Hitchcock	
1942	Between Us Girls	Jimmy Blake	Henry Koster	
1943	Forever and a Day	Ned Trimble	multiple director	
1943	Flesh and Fantasy	Michael	Julien Duvivier	Episode 1
1943	Princess O'Rourke	Eddie O'Rourke	Norman Krasna	
1945	You Came Along	Maj. Bob Collins	John Farrow	
1946	The Bride Wore Boots	Jeff Warren	Irving Pichel	
1946	The Chase	Chuck Scott	Arthur Ripley	
1947	Heaven Only Knows	Michael, aka Mike	Albert S. Rogell	
1947	The Lost Moment	Lewis Venable	Martin Gabel	
1948	Sleep, My Love	Bruce Elcott	Douglas Sirk	
1948	Let's Live a Little	Duke Crawford	Richard Wallace	
1949	The Accused	Warren Ford	William Dieterle	
1949	Reign of Terror aka The Black Book	Charles D'Aubigny	Anthony Mann	
1949	Free for All	Christopher Parker	Charles Barton	
1949	Tell It to the Judge	Peter B. 'Pete' Webb	Norman Foster	
1950	Paid in Full	Bill Prentice	William Dieterle	
1950	The Petty Girl	George Petty aka Andrew 'Andy' Tapp	Henry Levin	
1950	For Heaven's Sake	Jeff Bolton	George Seaton	
1951	The Barefoot Mailman	Sylvanus Hurley	Earl McEvoy	
1952	The First Time	Joe Bennet	Frank Tashlin	
1953	Marry Me Again	Bill	Frank Tashlin	
1954	Lucky Me	Dick Carson	Jack Donohue	
1954	Dial M for Murder	Mark Halliday	Alfred Hitchcock	
1955	How to Be Very, Very Popular	Fillmore 'Wedge' Wedgewood	Nunnally Johnson	
1962	My Geisha	Bob Moore	Jack Cardiff	
1963	Beach Party	Professor Sutwell	William Asher	
1964	The Carpetbaggers	Dan Pierce	Edward Dmytryk	
1964	What a Way to Go!	Dr. Victor Stephanson	J. Lee Thompson	
1966	Promise Her Anything	Dr. Philip Brock	Arthur Hiller	
1966	Stagecoach	Henry Gatewood	Gordon Douglas	
1967	Five Golden Dragons	Bob Mitchell	Jeremy Summers	
1969	Gidget Grows Up	Russ Lawrence	James Sheldon	

== Stage work ==
- The Roof (1931)
- Ziegfeld Follies of 1934 (1934)
- Faithfully Yours (1951)
- The Wayward Stork (1966)
- Remember It's Never Too Late (1972)

== Television credits ==
- Somerset Maugham TV Theatre ("The Luncheon") (1951)
- Lux Video Theatre ("The Shiny People") (1951)
- My Hero (1951–1952) as Robert S. Beanblossom (33 episodes)
- Betty Crocker Star Matinee ("Sense of Humor") (1952)
- Robert Montgomery Presents ("Lila, My Love") (1952)
- Lux Video Theatre ("Pattern for Glory") (1952)
- Campbell Summer Soundstage ("The Test Case") (1954)
- Justice ("The Crisis") (1954)
- The Elgin Hour ("Floodtide") (1954)
- Best Foot Forward (1954) as Jack Haggerty
- Westinghouse Studio One ("Twelve Angry Men") (1954) as Juror No. 8
- The George Burns and Gracie Allen Show ("Gracie Thinks Bob Cummings Is in Love with Her") (1954)
- The Bob Cummings Show (1955–1959) as Bob Collins / Grandpa Josh Collins / Josh Collins (173 episodes)
- Dateline: Disneyland (1955) as Himself / Co-Host
- Studio One ("A Special Announcement") (1956) as George Lumley
- General Electric Theater ("Too Good with a Gun") (1957) as Russ Baker
- The George Burns and Gracie Allen Show ("A Marital Mix-Up") (1957)
- The Lucy-Desi Comedy Hour (1957–1960) ("The Ricardos Go To Japan") (1959) as Himself
- Schlitz Playhouse ("One Left Over") (1957)
- Schlitz Playhouse ("Dual Control") (1957)
- Playhouse 90 ("Bomber's Moon") (1958) as Colonel Culver
- The Twilight Zone ("King Nine Will Not Return") (1960) as Capt. James Embry
- Zane Grey Theater ("The Last Bugle") (1960) as Lt. Charles B. Gatewood
- The New Bob Cummings Show (1961–1962) as Bob Carson (22 episodes)
- The Dick Powell Theatre ("The Last of the Private Eyes") (1963)
- Bob Hope Presents the Chrysler Theatre ("The Square Peg") (1964)
- The Great Adventure ("Plague") (1964) as Dr. Benjamin Waterhouse
- My Living Doll (1964–1965) as Dr. Robert McDonald
- Bob Hope Presents the Chrysler Theatre ("Blind Man's Bluff") (196y)
- The Flying Nun ("Speak the Speech, I Pray You") (1969) as Father Walter Larson
- Gidget Grows Up (1969) as Russ Lawrence
- Love, American Style (1969) (first ever episode) as Bert Palmer (segment "Love and the Pill")
- Hollywood Squares (1970) as Guest Appearance
- Love American Style (1970) as Grandpa (segment "Love and the Second Time")
- Green Acres ("Rest and Relaxation") (1970) as Mort Warner
- Here Come the Brides ("The She-Bear") (1970) as Jack Crosse
- Arnie ("Hello Holly" (1971)
- Bewitched ("Samantha and the Troll") (1971) as Roland Berkley
- The Good Life ("A Tremendous Sense of Loyalty") (1971)
- Here's Lucy ("Lucy's Punctured Romance") (1972) as Bob Collins
- The Great American Beauty Contest (1973)
- Partners in Crime (1973) as Ralph Elsworth
- Love American Style (1973) as Walding (segment "Love and the Secret Spouse")
- Three on a Date (1978)
- The Love Boat ("Third Wheel/Grandmother's Day/Second String Mom") (1979) as Eliott Smith - co starring with Ethel Merman
- Walt Disney's Wonderful World of Color ("Walt Disney World's 15th Anniversary Celebration") (1986) as Host / Narrator / Himself
- Disneyland's 35th Anniversary Special (1990) as Himself (final film role)

== Radio credits ==
- Lux Radio Theatre "You Can't Take it With You" (1939)
- Suspense "Dead of the Night" (1944 and 1947)
- Lux Radio Theatre - "Without Reservations" (1946)
- Hollywood Star Time - "The Most Dangerous Game" (1946)
- Lux Radio Theatre - "Great Expectations" (1947)
- Screen Directors Playhouse - "Lets Live a Little" (1949)
- Lux Radio Theatre - "What a Woman" (1949)
- Four Star Playhouse - "Third Girl from the Right" (1949)
- Four Star Playhouse - "Surprise for the Professor" (1949)
- Lux Radio Theatre - "I'll Be Yours" with Ann Blyth (1950)
- Cavalcade of America - "Decision in the Valley" (1950)
- Screen Guild Theatre - "Tell It to the Judge" (1950)
- Cavalcade of America ("Spindletop") - with Teresa Wright (1951)
- Screen Directors Playhouse ("Bachelor Mother") (1951)
- Cavalcade of America - "Uncle Eurys Dollar" (1951)
- Cavalcade of America ("Going Up") (1952)
- Cavalcade of America - "The Melody Man" (1952)
- Four Star Playhouse - "The Hunted" (1953)
- Lux Radio Theatre - "Strangers on a Train" (1954)
