= Best Foot Forward (film) =

1943 film by Edward Buzzell

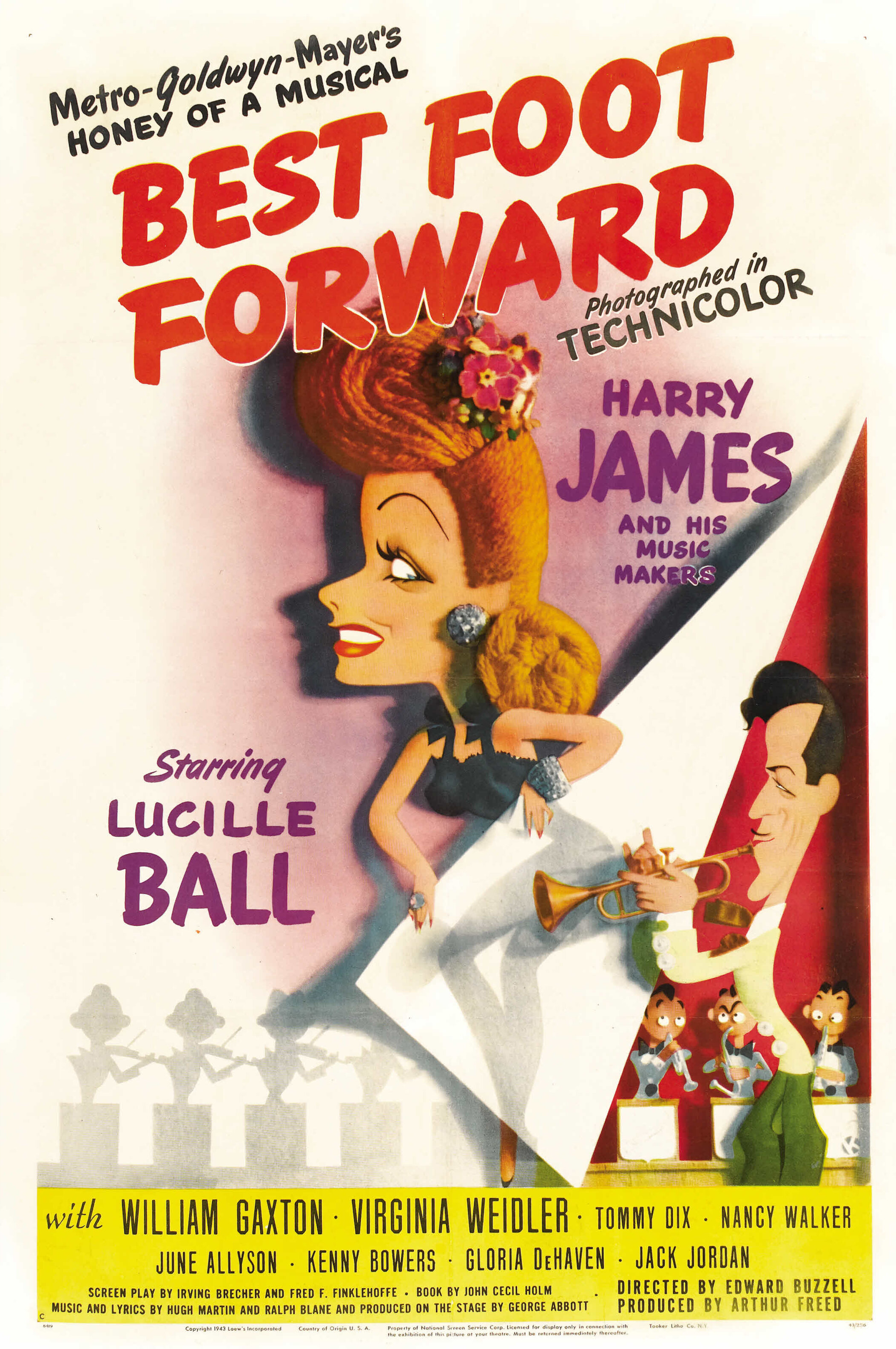
- Theatrical release poster
- Directed by: Edward Buzzell
- Screenplay by: Irving Brecher; Fred F. Finklehoffe; Dorothy Kingsley (Note: Contributing writer (uncredited))
- Based on: Best Foot Forward by John Cecil Holm
- Produced by: Arthur Freed
- Starring: Lucille Ball; William Gaxton; Virginia Weidler; Tommy Dix; Nancy Walker; June Allyson; Kenny Bowers; Gloria DeHaven; Jack Jordan
- Cinematography: Leonard Smith
- Edited by: Blanche Sewell
- Music by: Lennie Hayton
- Production company: Metro Goldwyn Mayer
- Distributed by: Loew's Inc.
- Release date: October 8, 1943
- Running time: 94 minutes
- Country: United States
- Language: English
- Budget: $1,162,000
- Box office: $2,704,000

Best Foot Forward is a 1943 American musical comedy film directed by Edward Buzzell, based on the 1941 Broadway musical by John Cecil Holm. The film stars Lucille Ball, William Gaxton, Virginia Weidler, Tommy Dix, Nancy Walker, June Allyson, Kenny Bowers, Gloria DeHaven, and Jack Jordan.

The actors did their own singing, except for Ball, whose singing was dubbed by Gloria Grafton; Weidler, whose singing was dubbed by Jeanne Darrell; and Jordan, whose singing was dubbed by Ralph Blane.

Weidler, then 16 years old, retired from acting after this film was made, making Best Foot Forward her final screen appearance.

== Plot ==
Lucille Ball is at a military academy full of frisky boys. Ball is the reluctant guest of a diminutive cadet, Bud Hooper, who wrote her a "mash note" and invitation to be his date at a school prom.

Ball's publicity man, Jack O'Riley, seizes upon the situation as a perfect PR stunt, and convinces her to travel 3,000 miles to join Hooper at Winsocki Military Institute's dance. When Ball actually shows up, mayhem ensues. Hooper, who never dreamed she would accept, has to disinvite his girlfriend, Helen Schlesinger, and ask Ball to pretend to be Helen, lest the actress herself not pass muster with the institution's screening committee.

Helen fights back while Hooper tries to keep Ball from the clutches of other cadets who want to steal her for themselves. Meanwhile, Harry James and his orchestra perform various songs, including "The Flight of the Bumblebee".

== Cast ==
- Lucille Ball as herself
- William Gaxton as Jack O'Riley
- Virginia Weidler as Helen Schlesinger
- Tommy Dix as Bud Hooper
- Nancy Walker as Nancy
- June Allyson as Ethel (incorrectly listed as Minerva)
- Kenny Bowers as Dutch Miller
- Gloria DeHaven as Minerva (incorrectly listed as Ethel)
- Jack Jordan as Hunk Hoyt
- Beverly Tyler as Miss Delaware Water Gap
- Chill Wills as Chester Short
- Henry O'Neill as Major Reeber
- Sara Haden as Miss Talbert
- Donald MacBride as Captain Bradd
- Bob Stebbins as Greenie
- Darwood Kaye as Killer
- Morris Ankrum as Colonel Harkrider
- Nana Bryant as Mrs. Dalrymple
- Harry James and His Music Makers as themselves
- Caren Marsh Doll as Dancer (uncredited)

== Musical numbers ==
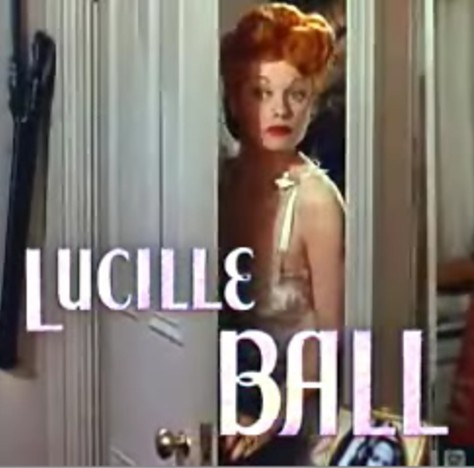
Sydney Guilaroff tinted Lucille Ball's hair flame red for her previous film, Du Barry Was a Lady (1943). She was so pleased, she kept it red for the rest of her life.

All songs by Ralph Blane and Hugh Martin.

- "Buckle Down, Winsocki" – Sung by Tommy Dix and Chorus behind titles
- "Wish I May Wish I Might" – Sung and Danced by Gloria DeHaven, June Allyson, Kenny Bowers, Jack Jordan (dubbed by Ralph Blane), Sara Haden, Donald McBride, and Chorus
- "Three Men on a Date" – Sung by Tommy Dix, Kenny Bowers, and Jack Jordan (dubbed by Ralph Blane)
- "Two O'Clock Jump" - Played by Harry James and His Music Makers
- "Ev'ry Time" - Played by Harry James and His Music Makers
- "Ev'ry Time" (vocal reprise) – Sung by Virginia Weidler (dubbed by Jeanne Darrell)
- "Flight of the Bumblebee" – Played by Harry James and His Music Makers
- "The Three B's" – Sung and Danced by June Allyson, Gloria DeHaven, Nancy Walker, and Chorus with Harry James and His Music Makers.
- "I Know You by Heart" – Played by Harry James and His Music Makers
- "My First Promise (The Ring Waltz)" – Sung by Beverly Tyler and Chorus with Harry James and His Music Makers
- "Alive and Kickin'" – Performed by Nancy Walker and Harry James and His Music Makers, Danced by Harry James and Nancy Walker
- "You're Lucky" – Sung by Lucille Ball (dubbed by Gloria Grafton)
- "Buckle Down, Winsocki" (reprise) – Sung by Tommy Dix and Chorus

== Box office ==
According to MGM records, the film earned $2,051,000 in the US and Canada, and $653,000 elsewhere, resulting in a profit of $398,000.
