= Best Foot Forward (cast recording) =

Soundtrack album by Various artists
- Released: 2 April 1963
- Genre: Show tunes
- Label: Cadence Records

Liza Minnelli chronology
Best Foot Forward (1963)	Liza! Liza! (1964)

Singles from Best Foot Forward
- 1. "You Are for Loving"/"What Do You Think I Am" Released: 1963

Best Foot Forward is the cast recording of the 1963 off-Broadway revival of the musical comedy. The album features performances by a young company, including Liza Minnelli in one of her earliest professional appearances, and captures the score by Hugh Martin and Ralph Blane with primarily piano accompaniment.

The album was released by Cadence Records and became part of a rare trend at the time for independent labels to issue musical theatre recordings. It included the single "You Are for Loving"/"What Do You Think I Am", which received positive attention, and was later reissued by Stet Records and Piccadilly with new covers, and titled Best Foot Forward – The Off-Broadway Hit Revival that Introduce Liza Minnelli (1977) and Best Foot Forward – The Musical Comedy Featuring Liza Minnelli (1982), respectively.

== Overview ==
Best Foot Forward is a musical comedy that follows a prep school student who invites a Hollywood movie star to attend his prom, with surprising results. The story centers on the humorous situations that arise from the encounter, featuring a score by Hugh Martin and Ralph Blane. The 1963 Off-Broadway revival at Stage 73 ran for 224 performances. It was directed and choreographed by Danny Daniels and featured newcomer Liza Minnelli. According to Cash Box Minnelli's performance "got solid notices in her featured role". The release of the original cast album was part of a rare trend at the time for independent labels to issue musical theatre recordings.

The first single released, "You Are for Loving"/"What Do You Think I Am" (Cadence 1436) was given a B rating by Cash Box. The A-side, "You Are for Loving", was praised as a "charming" addition to the musical's score, with Liza Minnelli's vocals noted for their resemblance to her mother, Judy Garland, and complemented by an attractive orchestral backing. The B-side was described as a delightful original tune by Martin and Blane, further highlighting the appeal of the single as a whole.

The cast album was one of the final releases by Cadence Records before the label ceased operations in September 1963. In 1977, Stet Records re-released the album with a new cover including the subtitle The Off-Broadway Hit Revival that Introduce Liza Minnelli. In 1982, the album was reissued by Piccadilly (catalog number PiC 3485), with a new cover and titled Best Foot Forward – The Musical Comedy Featuring Liza Minnelli.

== Critical reception ==
Professional ratings
Review scores
Source	Rating
AllMusic	3/5 stars
Cast Album Reviews	3/5 stars

Billboard described the album as "a sprightly production which can win favor despite the shortcomings of the typical off Broadway accompaniment of twin pianos". The magazine also noted that the score gives Liza Minnelli room to "show her vocal likeness to her famous mother" and that she "romps through the famous 'Ninotchka' story with abandon".

In a retrospective review, William Ruhlmann of AllMusic described the album as "a barebones version of the score, played on only two pianos", adding that Liza Minnelli "remains the reason to listen [it]". Richard Barrios of Cast Album Reviews wrote that "judging from this recording, the cast had just the kind of enthusiasm needed for this show". He also remarked that "with its modest piano accompaniment, this performance has the appropriate air of a high school musical done by an unusually gifted group of students"

== Track listing ==
Best Foot Forward - Side A
No.	Title	Writer(s)	Performers	Length
1.	"Wish I May (Wish I Might)"	Hugh Martin, Ralph Blane	Ensemble	2:48
2.	"Three Men On A Date"	Hugh Martin, Ralph Blane	Glenn Walken, Ronald Walken, Edmund Gaynes	2:48
3.	"Hollywood Story"	Hugh Martin, Ralph Blane	Paula Wayne, Grant Walden	3:48
4.	"The Three 'B's'"	Hugh Martin, Ralph Blane	Liza Minnelli, Kay Cole, Renée Winters	5:29
5.	"Ev'ry Time"	Hugh Martin, Ralph Blane	Karin Wolfe	4:10
6.	"Alive and Kicking"	Hugh Martin, Ralph Blane	Paula Wayne	2:42
7.	"The Guy Who Brought Me"	Hugh Martin, Ralph Blane	Paula Wayne, Grant Walden, Edmund Gaynes
8.	"Shady Lady Bird"	Hugh Martin, Ralph Blane	Karin Wolfe, Edmund Gaynes, Gene Castle, Don Slaton, Paul Charles	2:53

Best Foot Forward - Side B
No.	Title	Writer(s)	Performers	Length
1.	"Buckle Down Winsocki"	Hugh Martin, Ralph Blane	Jack Irwin, Edmund Gaynes, Ensemble	4:07
2.	"You're Lucky"	Hugh Martin, Ralph Blane	Paula Wayne	2:50
3.	"What Do You Think I Am?"	Hugh Martin, Ralph Blane	Edmund Gaynes, Liza Minnelli, Kay Cole, Ronald Walken	3:08
4.	"A Raving Beauty"	Hugh Martin, Ralph Blane	Ronald Walken, Kay Cole	3:10
5.	"Just A Little Joint With A Juke Box"	Hugh Martin, Ralph Blane	Liza Minnelli	2:55
6.	"You Are For Loving"	Hugh Martin, Ralph Blane	Liza Minnelli	5:13
7.	"Reprise: Buckle Down Winsocki"	Hugh Martin, Ralph Blane	Paula Wayne, Ensemble	9:33

== Personnel ==
Credits adapted from Best Foot Forward LP (Cadence, CLP 24012).

- Music and lyrics by Hugh Martin and Ralph Blane
- Arranged (Dance Music) and piano by William Goldenberg
- Directed and choreographed by Danny Daniels
- Engineered by Bob Arnold
- Lighting by Jules Fisher
- Music direction and piano by Buster Davis
- Produced by Archie Bleyer
- Production managed by Toni Manzi
- Assistant production managers – Anne Wallace, Patricia Stewart
- Stage management by Robert Fletcher
