= Best Foot Forward (Max Liebman Presents) =

- Max Liebman Presents episode
- Episode no.: Season 1 Episode 6
- Directed by: Max Liebman
- Based on: Best Foot Forward by John Cecil Holm
- Original air date: 1954

"Best Foot Forward" is a 1954 American television episode adaptation of the musical Best Foot Forward. It was directed by Max Liebman as part of a series of color spectaculars. It was Jeannie Carson's American debut.

== Cast ==
- Marilyn Maxwell as Gale Joy
- Robert Cummings as Jack Haggerty
- Charlie Applewhite as Bud Hooper
- Hope Holliday as Minerva
- Jeannie Carson as Helen Twitterton
- Harrison Muller as Dutch
- Pat Carroll as Blind Date
- Candi Parsons as Ethel
- Arte Johnson as Chuck
- James Komack as Hunk
- Howard St. John as Dean Reeber
- Gene Blakely as Chester Billings

== Reception ==
The New York Times called it "delightful".
