= Best Foot Forward (musical) =

1941 American musical

- Original Revival Cast recording from the 1963 Off-Broadway production
- Music: Hugh Martin and Ralph Blane
- Lyrics: Hugh Martin and Ralph Blane
- Book: John Cecil Holm
- Productions: 1941 Broadway; 1943 Film; 1954 TV movie 1963 Off Broadway revival

Best Foot Forward is a 1941 musical with songs by Hugh Martin and Ralph Blane, and a book by John Cecil Holm. Produced by George Abbott, the production opened on Broadway on October 1, 1941, at the Ethel Barrymore Theatre after an out-of-town tryout, where it ran for 326 performances. It was directed by Abbott, with choreography by Gene Kelly and starred Rosemary Lane. The show was Nancy Walker's Broadway debut and also launched June Allyson into stardom. Sets and lighting were by Jo Mielziner, and costumes were by Miles White.

The musical's success led to a 1943 film adaptation starring Lucille Ball, June Allyson and Nancy Walker, and a 1954 television adaptation. A 1953 tour featured Debbie Reynolds and Joan Bennett.

The 1963 Off-Broadway revival at Stage 73 ran for 224 performances. It was directed and choreographed by Danny Daniels and featured newcomer Liza Minnelli, who won a Theatre World Award, and Christopher Walken. Veronica Lake was a replacement for Paula Wayne as Gale. A recording of this revival is available on CD.

== Background and reception ==
Before Best Foot Forward, George Abbott had hired Hugh Martin to write musical arrangements for several shows, including Rodgers and Hart shows. By 1941, Larry Hart was suffering from alcoholism, and Richard Rodgers was having difficulty working with him. Abbot chose Martin and his collaborator to write the songs for his new musical with a high school theme based on an unpublished play by John Cecil Holm, whom he engaged to write the book. Abbott knew that lighthearted and innocent student-themed musicals, including a few of his own, had proved popular in past Broadway shows. The prep-school theme also allowed Abbott to hire a cast of inexpensive unknown actors who were too young to be pulled away from the show by the draft.

The show's lively direction and choreography, comical hijinks and catchy tunes led to a strong run for a pre-Oklahoma! show. Brooks Atkinson of The New York Times liked the "good humored" show, especially praising the score, choreography, Walker and Allyson. Other critics mostly agreed, although some felt that the show's youthful exuberance was carried too far.

== Synopsis ==
Just for fun, prep school student Bud Hooper writes a fan letter asking his idol, Hollywood actress Gale Joy, to come to Philadelphia to be his partner at the junior prom. His school is Winsocki Military Academy. Jack Haggerty, the actress' manager in Hollywood, sees an opportunity for publicity and advises Gale to accept Bud's invitation. The appearance of the famous star at Winsocki is greeted with excitement, and Bud abandons his own girl Helen Schlessinger to accompany Gale to the ball. Out of jealousy, Helen tears Gale's sash while she is dancing, which causes a riot. Others begin to tear off pieces of Gale's clothes as well, but only to gain souvenirs from the famous star.

The boys hide Gale in their dormitory, where farcical comings and goings ensue. The school regards the incident as a scandal, and Bud is now in danger of being expelled. Gale and Jack try to avoid furor and go back to Hollywood. After Bud and Helen settle their arguments and any other problems are solved, everything at Winsocki goes back to normal.

== Roles and original Broadway cast ==
- Minerva – June Allyson
- Hunk Hoyt – Kenneth Bowers
- Helen Schlessinger – Maureen Cannon
- Junior – Danny Daniels
- Freshman – Richard Dick
- Chuck Green – Tommy Dix
- Prof. Williams – Robert Griffith
- Satchel Moyer – Bobby Harrell
- Professor Lloyd – Roger Hewlett
- Dutch Miller – Jack Jordan, Jr.
- Gale Joy – Rosemary Lane
- Old Grad – Stuart Langley
- Waitress – Norma Lehn
- Jack Haggerty – Marty May
- Miss Ferguson and Miss Delaware Water Gap – Betty Anne Nyman
- Goofy Clark – Lee Roberts
- Ethel – Victoria Schools
- Bud Hooper – Gil Stratton
- Blind Date – Nancy Walker
- Dr. Reeber – Fleming Ward
- Fred Jones – Lou Wills, Jr.
- Chester Billings – Vincent York

== Songs ==
=== Act 1 ===
- "Don't Sell the Night Short" (Minerva, Blind Date, Students and Girls)
- "Three Men on a Date" (Bud Hooper, Dutch and Hunk Hoyt)
- "That's How I Love the Blues" (Gale Joy and Jack)
- "The Three B's" (Ethel, Minerva and Blind Date)
- "Ev'ry Time" (Helen)
- "The Guy Who Brought Me" (Gale, Jack, Bud, Dutch and Hunk Hoyt) – music and some lyrics by Richard Rodgers
- "I Know You by Heart" (Bud)
- "Shady Lady Bird" (Helen and Students)
- "Shady Lady Bird (reprise)" (Helen and Ensemble)

=== Act 2 ===
- "Buckle Down, Winsocki" (Hunk, Old Grad and Chorus)
- "My First Promise" (Ethel and Singers)
- "What Do You Think I Am?" (Minerva, Hunk and Chorus)
- "Just a Little Joint with a Juke Box" (Hunk and Blind Date)
- "Where Do You Travel?" (Jack, Helen, Miss Delaware Water Gap, and Singers)
- "Ev'ry Time (Reprise)" (Gale)
- "I'd Gladly Trade" (Gale and Company)
