= Friendship (Cole Porter song) =

Song by Cole Porter

- by Cole Porter (music & lyrics)
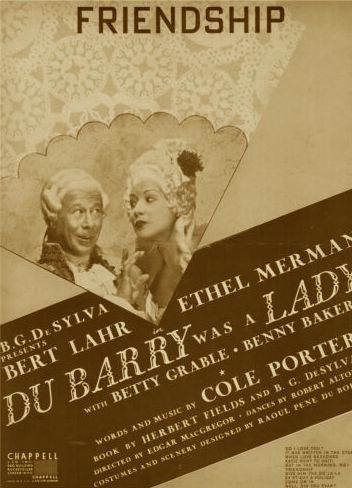
- Original Sheet Music Cover
- Genre: Popular song from the 1939 musical Du Barry Was a Lady
- Publisher: Warner Chappell Music

"Friendship" is a song written by Cole Porter from his 1939 musical DuBarry Was a Lady where it was introduced by Ethel Merman and Bert Lahr. The song was once again performed in the 1943 film version starring Red Skelton, Lucille Ball, Gene Kelly and Tommy Dorsey.

== History ==
Cole Porter wrote "Friendship" for the finale to his 1939 musical DuBarry Was a Lady which opened on Broadway at the 46th Street Theatre on December 6, 1939. It was premiered by Ethel Merman as Mme. La Comtesse du Barry and Bert Lahr as The King of France. In subsequent productions, Frances Day and Arthur Riscoe performed the song in the original 1942 London premiere; and Faith Prince and Robert Morse performed it in the 1996 Encores! revival.

In 1943, Lucille Ball, Red Skelton, Gene Kelly and Tommy Dorsey performed the song in the film version of the Metro-Goldwyn-Mayer musical. Ball's singing voice was dubbed by Martha Mears for most of the picture, but her real voice was used in "Friendship". Ball and Kelly reunited in 1978 and performed the song on Kelly's television special, "An American in Pasadena", which aired on March 13, 1978.

The 1962 Off-Broadway revival of Cole Porter's musical Anything Goes incorporate the song, along with other Porter songs such as "It's De-Lovely", "Red, Hot and Blue", "Let's Misbehave" and "Take Me Back to Manhattan". All subsequent revivals of the musical still incorporated "Friendship" into the score of Anything Goes. Notable performers who have performed the song in the musical are Sutton Foster, Chita Rivera, Patti Lupone, Leslie Uggams, Elaine Paige and Andrea McArdle.

In episode 3, season 3 of I Love Lucy titled "Lucy and Ethel Buy the Same Dress", Lucy and Ethel rehearse and then perform the song.

== Recorded versions ==
- Judy Garland and Johnny Mercer with Victor Young and His Orchestra, single, Decca, April 15, 1940
- Kay Kyser and His Orchestra, single, Columbia, January 9, 1940
- T. Dorsey Family (Mountain Branch) - a.k.a. The Pied Pipers with Fred Stulce, single, Bluebird/RCA/Victor, June 6, 1940
- Madeline Kahn, Cybill Shepherd and Burt Reynolds, At Long Last Love - Original Motion Picture Soundtrack. Album. March 1, 1975, Twentieth Century Fox
- Ray Charles with Ricky Skaggs - Ray Charles and Friends. Album. July 6, 1984.
- Ann Hampton Callaway and Liz Callaway - Sibling Revelry. Album. February 1997
- Enoch Light and The Light Brigade: A New Concept of Great Cole Porter Songs, 1965
- Frank Chacksfield and His Orchestra: The Music of Cole Porter, 1972
