= The Valley of Ghosts =

The Valley of Ghosts may refer to:

- Valley of Ghosts (Crimea), a valley with unusual rock formations
- The Valley of Ghosts (novel), a 1922 novel by Edgar Wallace
- The Valley of Ghosts (film), a 1928 film directed by G.B. Samuelson
