= Du Barry Was a Lady (film) =

1943 American film directed by Roy Del Ruth

- Theatrical release poster
- Directed by: Roy Del Ruth
- Screenplay by: Irving Brecher
- Adaptation by: Nancy Hamilton
- Additional dialogue by: Wilkie Mahoney
- Based on: Du Barry Was a Lady; 1939 play by Herbert Fields; Buddy G. DeSylva
- Produced by: Arthur Freed
- Starring: Red Skelton; Lucille Ball; Gene Kelly
- Cinematography: Karl Freund; Howard Kress (uncredited)
- Edited by: Blanche Sewell
- Music by: Cole Porter
- Production company: Metro-Goldwyn-Mayer
- Distributed by: Loew's, Inc.
- Release dates: August 19, 1943 (New York City); 1943 (United States)
- Running time: 96 minutes
- Country: United States
- Language: English
- Budget: $1.3 million
- Box office: $3.5 million

Du Barry Was a Lady is a 1943 American musical comedy film directed by Roy Del Ruth, starring Red Skelton, Lucille Ball, Gene Kelly, and Tommy Dorsey and His Orchestra. It is based on the 1939 stage musical of the same name. Shot in Technicolor, the film was produced and distributed by Metro-Goldwyn-Mayer.

== Plot ==
Nightclub singer May Daly turns the heads of many men, including coatroom attendant Louis Blore and master of ceremonies Alec Howe. While May is in love with Alec, she persists in holding out for a wealthy husband due to her poor upbringing. After portraying Madame Du Barry for a musical number, Alec confesses his love for her by singing a song. However, she rejects his advances for the rich, haughty Willie. After an attendant spills a salad over his jacket, she cancels their plans to attend a party and goes home on the subway with Louis. While on the train, her view of marrying for money is challenged by Louis and an elderly woman.

The following day, a telegram arrives to inform Louis he is the winner of a prize of $150,000 in the Irish Sweepstakes. He immediately declares his love for May, who is teased by Alec that she now has no reason to stay with Willie and avoid Louis. However, he is furious upon discovering May intends on marrying him due to his newfound wealth. When May tells Louis she only plans to marry him due to his money, he is seemingly content with this.

After accidentally swallowing a drugged drink, Louis falls into a deep sleep and dreams that he is King Louis XV at Versailles. May is Madame Du Barry, Alec is the Robin Hood-like Black Arrow, Willie is the Duc de Rigor, and nightclub waiter Charlie is the Dauphin.

Louis is dumbfounded at first by the scene but soon becomes accustomed to it, as he is seduced by the prestige and privilege of being King. When he goes to visit Du Barry at her palace, he finds her scolding royal guards for failing to find the Black Arrow, who has threatened her life. However, she is more interested in the chase of him, as she cannot bring herself to call the guards when she finds him hiding in her bedroom. While the guards chase him off the property, Louis falls over a cliffside.

Du Barry infiltrates a tavern meeting held by the Black Arrow. The outlaw incites the angry peasantry to overthrow the King due to his and Du Barry's greediness, unwittingly seducing Du Barry in the process. Louis, who has been camping out as his clothing dries, becomes caught up in marching with the Black Arrow's mob. However, the royal soldiers capture the Black Arrow and the mob.

Under the influence of his court, Louis sentences the Black Arrow to death by the guillotine. During the sentencing, Louis is shot with an arrow by his son, which becomes stuck in his back. Du Barry begs Louis to spare the Black Arrow, confessing to him that she loves him. He agrees to do so, but is stopped by Rigor, who wants to woo Du Barry himself. Rigor challenges Louis to a sword fight as Du Barry goes to be beside the Black Arrow.

As Louis appears to be losing the sword fight, he awakens from the dream to find himself being comforted by another club singer, Ginny, who has been aggressive in her romantic pursuit of him. Louis tries to convince May and Alec to wed, only to find that May has changed her mind about money's importance and decided to marry Alec anyway. As they reject Louis' attempts to give them a wedding gift of $10,000, a tax collector arrives to demand that Louis pay him the remaining $80,000 in tax on the winnings.

== Cast ==
- Red Skelton as Louis Blore/Louis XV
- Lucille Ball as May Daly/Madame Du Barry
- Gene Kelly as Alec Howe/The Black Arrow
- Virginia O'Brien as Ginny/Du Barry's lady-in-waiting
- Rags Ragland as Charlie/Dauphin
- Zero Mostel as Rami, the Swami/Taliostra
- Donald Meek as Mr. Jones/Duc de Choiseul
- Douglass Dumbrille as Willie/Duc de Rigor
- George Givot as Cheezy/Count de Roquefort
- Louise Beavers as Niagara
- Tommy Dorsey and His Orchestra as themselves

Uncredited:

- Hugh Beaumont as footman
- Clara Blandick as old lady on subway
- Charles Coleman as Charlie, the doorman
- William Forrest as Guard captain
- Ava Gardner as cologne girl
- Marilyn Maxwell as Miss February – Vargas calendar girl
- Martha Mears as Lucille Ball's singing voice
- Paul Newlan as marching rebel on King Louis' left
- Lana Turner as herself
- Pierre Watkin as Ambrose

== Production ==
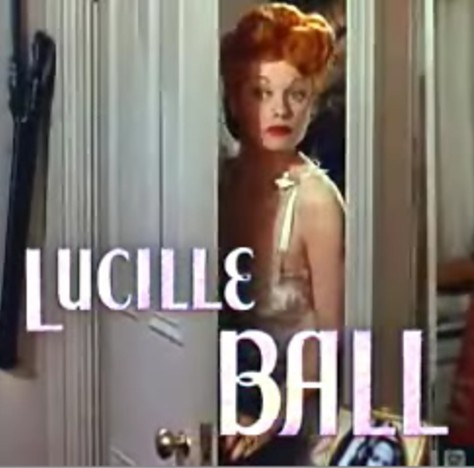
Hair stylist Sydney Guilaroff tinted Lucille Ball's hair flame red for this film. She was so pleased, she kept it that way for the rest of her life.

In 1941, RKO and MGM entered into an intense bidding war for the adaption rights to the Broadway play Du Barry Was a Lady. The play, starring Ethel Merman in the leading role with music from Cole Porter, had been a success on Broadway, as had their subsequent project Panama Hattie. MGM acquired the rights to both for $80,000. The studio quickly made a film adaption of the latter starring comedian Red Skelton and Ann Sothern. The film was a success upon its release in September 1942.

Du Barry was initially developed as a re-teaming of Skelton and Sothern, with Keenan Wynn in the other role of the trio. However, Sothern turned down the revised role, in part because she was pregnant with her daughter Tisha Sterling. Following Sothern's departure, MGM decided to cast the newly signed Lucille Ball. MGM also cast Gene Kelly over Wynn, as a follow-up vehicle to For Me and My Gal. The film began production in August 1942 and was completed by November.

Adapting the play proved to be challenging. The studio was forced to alter the script significantly to comply with the Hays Code. Much of the play's script was replaced with less risqué material and additional characters. As a result of the casting of non-singers Skelton and Ball, Freed discarded most of the play's original Cole Porter score in favor of original music created by his unit for Tommy Dorsey and His Orchestra and others. This resulted in the first portion of the film being a vaudeville segment set in the nightclub having little to do with the storyline. Unlike the play, the dream sequence featured little singing and more physical comedy bits from Ball and Skelton.

Lucille Ball later hired Karl Freund to be the director of photography on her television series I Love Lucy.

== Songs ==
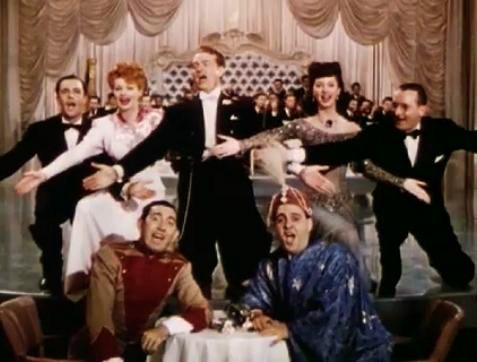
Singing "Friendship", back row L–R: Gene Kelly, Lucille Ball, Red Skelton, Virginia O'Brien and Tommy Dorsey; front: Rags Ragland, Zero Mostel

Musical numbers featured Tommy Dorsey and His Orchestra (with Buddy Rich and Ziggy Elman), Dick Haymes, Jo Stafford, The Pied Pipers, Six Hits and a Miss, and the Music Maids. Lucille Ball's singing voice was dubbed by Martha Mears in most of the picture, but her real voice is heard in "Friendship".

Music and lyrics are by Cole Porter, except where noted.

- Medley: "Du Barry Was a Lady" (Main Title) (music by Burton Lane, lyrics by Ralph Freed)/"Do I Love You?" – MGM Studio Orchestra
- "Du Barry Was a Lady" – MGM Studio Chorus
- Nightclub Medley: "Give Him the Ooh-La-La"/"Well, Did You Evah!" [Partial] – MGM Studio Orchestra
- Oxford Boys Medley: "Thinking of You" (by Walter Donaldson and Paul Ash)/"A Cigarette, Sweet Music and You" (by Roy Ringwald)
- Medley: "I'm Getting Sentimental over You" (music by George Bassman, lyrics by Ned Washington)/"Well, Git It!" (music by Sy Oliver) – Tommy Dorsey
- "When Love Beckoned (On 52nd Street)" – MGM Studio Orchestra
- "Do I Love You?" – Gene Kelly
- "Do I Love You?" – Tommy Dorsey & His Orchestra, The Pied Pipers
- "Salome" (music by Roger Edens, lyrics by E.Y. Harburg) – Virginia O'Brien
- "I Love an Esquire Girl" (music by Edens, lyrics by Lew Brown and Ralph Freed) – Tommy Dorsey & His Orchestra, The Pied Pipers, Red Skelton
- Medley: "Friendship"/"Do I Love You?"/"But in the Morning, No" – MGM Studio Orchestra
- "Ladies of the Bath" (by Edens) – Red Skelton and chorus
- "Katie Went to Haiti" – Tommy Dorsey & His Orchestra, The Pied Pipers
- "Madame, I Love Your Crepes Suzette" (by Lane and Freed) – Red Skelton
- "Song of the Rebellion" (by Edens) – Gene Kelly
- "Friendship" – Lucille Ball, Tommy Dorsey & His Orchestra, Gene Kelly, Virginia O'Brien, Red Skelton

== Reception ==
=== Critical response ===
Bosley Crowther, in his review for The New York Times, wrote, "they have caught most of the humor of the original, with a lot of Red Skelton's own thrown in. And they have added Rags Ragland and Zero Mostel to be funny when Mr. Skelton is not... particularly they have given the whole show a Technicolor sheen, an eye-filling opulence and splendor, which is fabulous in these rationed times."

=== Box office ===
According to MGM records, the film earned $2,572,000 in the US and Canada and $924,000 elsewhere, resulting in a profit of $857,000.
