= Give Him the Ooh-La-La =

Give Him the Ooh-La-La may refer to:

- Give Him the Ooh-La-La (album), a 1958 studio album by American jazz singer Blossom Dearie
- "Give Him the Ooh-La-La" (song), a 1939 popular song written by Cole Porter, for his musical DuBarry Was a Lady
