= Anything Goes =

1934 musical with music and lyrics by Cole Porter

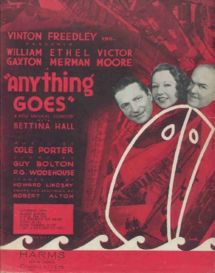
- Sheet music from original Broadway production
- Music: Cole Porter
- Lyrics: Cole Porter
- Book: Guy Bolton; P. G. Wodehouse; Howard Lindsay; Russel Crouse; John Weidman (1987 revival); Timothy Crouse (1987 revival)
- Productions: 1934 Broadway; 1935 West End; 1987 Broadway Revival; 1989 West End revival 2003 West End revival 2011 Broadway revival 2012 US tour 2015 UK tour 2021/2022 London revival 2022 UK tour
- Awards: 1987 Tony Award for Best Revival; 2002 Laurence Olivier Award for Best Musical Revival; 2011 Tony Award for Best Revival of a Musical

Anything Goes is a musical with music and lyrics by Cole Porter. The original book was a collaborative effort by Guy Bolton and P. G. Wodehouse, revised considerably by the team of Howard Lindsay and Russel Crouse. The story concerns madcap antics aboard an ocean liner bound from New York to London. Billy Crocker is a stowaway in love with heiress Hope Harcourt, who is engaged to Lord Evelyn Oakleigh. Nightclub singer Reno Sweeney and Public Enemy Number 13, "Moonface" Martin, aid Billy in his quest to win Hope. Songs introduced that later became pop and jazz standards are "Anything Goes", "You're the Top", "All Through the Night", and "I Get a Kick Out of You".

Since its November 21, 1934 debut at the Alvin Theatre (now known as the Neil Simon Theatre) on Broadway, the musical has been revived several times in the United States and Britain. It has been adapted for film three times (in 1936, 1956 and a filmed version of a stage production in 2021), and adapted for television also three times (in 1950, 1954 and 1962). The musical has long been a popular choice for school and community productions.

== History ==
The original idea for a musical set on board an ocean liner came from producer Vinton Freedley, who was living on a boat, having left the US to avoid his creditors. He selected the writing team, P. G. Wodehouse and Guy Bolton, and the star, Ethel Merman. The first draft of the show was called Crazy Week, which became Hard to Get, and finally Anything Goes. The original plot involved a bomb threat, a shipwreck, and human trafficking on a desert island, but, just a few weeks before the show was due to open, a fire on board the passenger ship SS Morro Castle caused the deaths of 138 passengers and crew members. According to one version, Freedley judged that to proceed with a show on a similar subject would be in dubious taste, and he insisted on changes to the script. However, theatre historian Lee Davis maintains that Freedley wanted the script changed because it was "a hopeless mess". Bolton and Wodehouse were in England at the time and were thus no longer available, so Freedley turned to his director, Howard Lindsay, to write a new book. Lindsay recruited press agent Russel Crouse as his collaborator, beginning a lifelong writing partnership. The roles of Billy Crocker and Moonface Martin were written for the comedy team William Gaxton and Victor Moore, and Gaxton's talent for assuming various disguises was featured in the libretto.

== Plot summary ==
Five versions of the libretto of Anything Goes exist: the original 1934 libretto, the 1962 off-Broadway revival libretto, the 1987 revival libretto, the 2011 revival libretto, and the 2022 revised libretto. The story has been revised, though all involve similar romantic complications aboard the SS American and feature the same major characters. The score has been altered, with some songs cut and others reassigned to different scenes and characters, and augmented with various Porter songs from other shows.

=== Original version (1934) ===
==== Act I ====
Billy Crocker, a young Wall Street broker, has fallen in love with a beautiful girl he met at a party and spent the evening with in a taxi. His boss, Elisha J. Whitney, is preparing to make a business deal and is going to travel to London aboard the SS American. Evangelist-turned-nightclub singer Reno Sweeney will be traveling aboard the same ship. Billy sees Reno as a friend, but she obviously has feelings for him ("I Get a Kick Out of You"). Billy goes to the dock to say farewell to his boss and Reno ("Bon Voyage"), and glimpses the mysterious girl again. He learns that she is the heiress Hope Harcourt and, escorted by her mother Mrs. Harcourt, is on her way to England with her fiancé Lord Evelyn Oakleigh, a handsome but stuffy and hapless British nobleman. Billy stows away on the ship with a plan of winning Hope's heart. "Moonface" Martin, a second-rate gangster labeled "Public Enemy 13", and his girlfriend, Bonnie, have disguised themselves as a minister and a missionary and, innocently aided by Billy, board the ship under their assumed identities, stranding the ship's real chaplain back at the port. Moonface and Bonnie mistakenly leave behind their leader, "Snake Eyes" Johnson, Public Enemy 1.

To thank him, Bonnie and Moonface let Billy have Snake Eyes Johnson's passport and ticket without telling him to whom they belong. Billy cons Evelyn into leaving him alone with Hope, by convincing him he is very ill. When he goes to get some air, Billy and Hope meet again, and it turns out she has been unable to stop thinking about him as well ("All Through the Night"). Though Hope prefers Billy, she insists she must marry Evelyn. Unbeknownst to Billy, her family's company is in financial trouble and a marriage to Evelyn would promote a merger and save it. The ship's crew gets a cable from New York saying that Public Enemy 1 is on board. Moonface admits his true identity to Billy and he and Bonnie conspire to disguise Billy as a crew member since he is now presumed to be Snake Eyes Johnson.

A quartet of lovelorn sailors comfort themselves with the thought of romance when they reach shore ("There'll Always Be a Lady Fair"). On deck, Bonnie lures the sailors to her ("Where Are the Men?"), then steals the clothes of one of the men for Billy.

Hope discusses her impending marriage with Evelyn and discovers that he is not particularly pleased with the engagement either. Billy asks Reno to help separate Evelyn and Hope, and she agrees. Billy and Reno reaffirm their friendship ("It's Friendship"). Reno tries to charm Evelyn; she succeeds and he invites her for a drink in his cabin. She and Moon plot that Moon should burst into the cabin and discover Reno half-naked in Evelyn's arms, providing sufficient reason for breaking off the engagement. However, when Moon breaks into the room, machine gun in tow, he instead sees Reno fully dressed and Evelyn nearly undressed. Moon tries to invent some indecent explanation for the situation, but Evelyn insists that he would be quite pleased by any rumor depicting him as a passionate lover, especially if Hope heard it. Moon admits that the plot has failed.

The crew discover that Billy is not a sailor, and Moon and Reno create a new disguise for him from a stolen pair of trousers, a jacket taken from a drunken passenger, and hair cut from Mrs. Harcourt's Pomeranian and made into a beard. Reno tells Billy that Evelyn has kissed her, and she is sure she will be Lady Oakleigh soon, since love moves so quickly these days ("Anything Goes"). Mrs. Harcourt, recognizing her dog's hair, angrily pulls off Billy's beard and the crew and passengers realize he must be the wanted man. As Snake Eyes Johnson, Billy is an instant celebrity.

==== Act II ====
Billy is honored by both crew and passengers as "Public Enemy Number One". He tells the Captain that Moon (who is still disguised as a minister) is helping him reform from his wicked ways. Moon is asked to lead a revival in the ship's lounge. The passengers confess their sins to the "Reverend", and Lord Evelyn admits to a one-night stand with a young Chinese woman, Plum Blossom. Hope is not impressed with Billy's charade, and to please her, he confesses to everyone that he is not really Snake Eyes Johnson. Moon attempts to compensate by revealing that he is not a minister; he is Public Enemy Number Thirteen. The captain sends them both to the brig. Reno restores the mood of the Revival ("Blow, Gabriel Blow").

Moon tries to cheer Billy up ("Be Like the Bluebird"). Billy doubts he will ever see Hope again; he and Moon cannot leave their cell until they return to America. Their card-playing Chinese cellmates Ching and Ling, imprisoned for conning all the third class passengers out of their money, will be put ashore in England. Moon and Billy challenge them to a game of strip poker, win their clothes, and disguise themselves again.

Billy, Moon, and Reno show up at the Oakleigh estate in Chinese garb. Billy and Moon tell Oakleigh's uncle that they are the parents of "Plum Blossom" and threaten to publicize Evelyn's indiscretion if he does not marry her. Oakleigh offers to buy them off and Moon gleefully accepts the cash, much to Billy and Reno's chagrin.

Billy and Reno find Hope and Evelyn, who are both unhappy with the prospect of their matrimony. Hope declares that she desperately wants to marry Billy ("The Gypsy in Me"). Billy spots Whitney and finally learns that Evelyn and Hope's planned marriage is really an awkward business merger. Billy realises that Oakleigh is manipulating them all; Hope's company is really worth millions and Billy informs Whitney of that fact. Whitney offers to buy the firm from Hope at an exorbitant price, and she accepts. The marriage is called off since a merger is now impossible. Billy and Hope get married, as do Reno and Evelyn. A cable from the U.S. government fixes Billy's passport problems and declares Moon "harmless". Moon indignantly pockets Oakleigh's check and refuses to return it.

=== Current version (1987, with minor changes in 2011) ===
==== Act I ====
Young Wall Street broker Billy Crocker helps his boss Elisha J. Whitney prepare for his trip to London. Eli tells Billy the next morning he is to make a huge sale of a sinking asset. Billy then runs into his friend; evangelist turned night club singer Reno Sweeney who is leaving on the same ship to London. Reno tries to convince Billy to join her, but he refuses and she laments her unrequited love for him ("I Get A Kick Out Of You"). Billy then reveals to Reno he has fallen in love with someone else and she berates him, believing he led her on before sadly reaffirming her feelings for him after he leaves ("I Get A Kick Out Of You - Reprise").

The next morning the crew of the SS American prepare to set sail ("There's No Cure Like Travel") as Reno and the other passengers board. Among them is debutante Hope Harcourt, the subject of Billy's infatuation. She is joined by her wealthy English fiancé Lord Evelyn Oakleigh and her mother Evangeline, who has set her daughter up to be married in order to solve their family's recent financial struggles. Billy comes aboard to give Eli his passport and spots Hope. Upon hearing that she is to be wed, he stays on the ship in order to pursue her. Also sneaking on to the American is Public Enemy No. 13 Moonface Martin, who is disguised as a priest. He is joined by Erma, the promiscuous girlfriend of Public Enemy #1 Snake Eyes Johnson, who is nowhere to be found. Billy inadvertently helps Moonface evade the FBI. Moonface returns the favor by giving Billy Snake Eyes' ticket as the ship leaves the dock ("Bon Voyage").

Later that night, Billy bumps into an apologetic Reno who encourages him to go after his real love. When Billy starts to express insecurities about being with Hope, Reno builds up his confidence while playfully putting herself down, and he returns the favor ("You're The Top"). Billy then scares off a seasick Evelyn so he can court Hope away from him ("So Easy To Love"). Though she returns Billy's feeling, Hope insists on maintaining her duty and marrying Evelyn. Once alone though, she repeats his romantic words ("So Easy To Love - Reprise").

Eli drunkenly sings about his excitement for the trip, reminisces on his days in Yale, and unsuccessfully invites Hope's mother, Evangeline, to spend the night with him ("The Crew Song"). In the next room over, Moonface and Erma are visited by Billy, who hides when the ship's captain comes in and reveals that Billy is believed to be Snake Eyes Johnson. The next morning a quartet of sailors sing about the joy of seeing women as they come ashore ("There'll Always Be a Lady Fair") while Erma steals another seaman's clothes to disguise Billy from the crew and his boss. Reno then encounters her old friend Moonface, shortly after which Evelyn approaches her and reveals himself to be a huge fan. Evelyn invites Reno for tea in his room, which Moonface convinces her to accept so she can seduce Evelyn, which they'll use to blackmail him and break up his engagement. Reno agrees to his plan and they sing about what great friends they are, only to descend into bickering ("Friendship").

The attempted extortion proves to be a failure, with Reno and Evelyn instead finding themselves utterly charmed by each other. Billy and Moonface then try to frame Evelyn as a madman to Evangeline only for Hope to step in and expose Billy's identity. The crew pursues him while Reno reprimands Hope for ignoring her own happiness and chasing away the man she loves. Hope breaks into tears before Billy returns to serenade her, with her now reciprocating ("It's Delovely"). However, the next morning Hope struggles to tell her mother of her real love and shortly afterwards Billy is apprehended by the crew. The captain then releases Billy to satisfy the celebrity-crazed passengers, and he basks in the fame of being a gangster whilst Moonface blows his cover to do the same. An upset Hope walks away whilst an onlooking Reno leads the ship in a tap dance and remarks that nowadays, "Anything Goes".

==== Act II ====
The whole ship has gathered to honor Billy as "Public Enemy No. 1". After unsuccessfully trying to get him and Hope back together, Reno begins her performance for that night. She starts out with a sermon asking passengers to confess their sins. In his confession, Evelyn tells everyone of the time he had casual sex with a Chinese woman named Plum Blossom. Reno then performs a lively gospel number with everyone else joining in ("Blow, Gabriel, Blow") at which point she declares "they've seen the light". The passengers then convince Billy to make a confession, and he reveals that he is not Snake Eyes Johnson and apologizes to Hope. Moonface tries and fails to defend him, and both are thrown in the brig. Reacting to this development, Evangeline moves the wedding up to the next morning on the ship and a heartbroken Hope realizes her chance at true love is over ("Goodbye Little Dream, Goodbye").

In the brig, Moonface attempts to cheer up a depressed Billy by telling him to "Be Like The Bluebird". Erma visits them to deliver a letter from Hope where she confesses her feelings for Billy, at which point they both — on separate parts of the ship — express their love ("All Through The Night"). Reno then meets Evelyn on the deck where he admits that he doesn't love Hope and hints that he has fallen for her instead. Despite this, his sense of honor and family code causes him to keep the engagement. Reno then notes that his one night stand in China contradicts this. At her prodding, Evelyn reveals his Romani ancestry and the wild side he'd previously tried to keep hidden. He shows his true feelings for her, she requites them, and they have a passionate tango dance ("Gypsy In Me").

Two Chinese passengers are thrown into the brig with Billy and Moonface for gambling. Reno then comes to tell her friends that she and Evelyn have fallen in love with each other. Knowing that the Chinese passengers will be let out in an hour, the three then steal their clothes to get Billy and Moonface out in time to stop the wedding. On the deck, Erma is proposed to by all the sailors she's slept with during the cruise. She warns them if they start a relationship, she won't be easily pleased ("Buddy Beware").

The wedding starts but is interrupted when Reno, Billy, and Moonface run in wearing Chinese garb. They claim that Reno is Plum Blossom, who is actually a Chinese princess that Evelyn dishonored when he slept with her. The ruse is almost ruined when Moonface accepts Eli's bribe to leave, but Hope intervenes by saying the only way for Evelyn to right his wrong is if he offers her to Plum Blossom's relative. Evelyn goes along with this, giving Hope away to Billy, and then proposing to Reno who accepts as she unmasks herself. Evangeline is distraught over the idea of becoming poor, but Eli proposes to her, bragging that his recent Wall Street sale has made him rich. Their mutual delight is cut short when Billy unveils his identity and informs his boss that he never made the sale. Evangeline prepares to leave Eli immediately but before she can do so, a wire comes in saying that the stock that wasn't sold has gone through the roof making him even richer than he imagined. All three couples now together sing to each other as they're married and the whole ship celebrates ("Finale").

== Characters ==
- Reno Sweeney — a sultry evangelist turned nightclub singer and an old friend of Billy
- Billy Crocker — a young Wall Street broker in love with Hope
- Moonface Martin — a second-rate gangster, "Public Enemy No. 13"
- Hope Harcourt — an American debutante
- Lord Evelyn Oakleigh — Hope's wealthy and eccentric English fiancé
- Bonnie/Erma — Moonface's girlfriend (1934 original), Snake Eyes' girlfriend and Moonface's friend (2011 revival)
- Elisha J. Whitney — an Ivy League Wall Street banker, Billy's boss
- Mrs. Evangeline Harcourt — Hope's haughty and overbearing mother
- Cheeky — Mrs. Harcourt's small companion dog, usually portrayed as a Pekingese
- Captain, steward, purser on the ship
- Ching and Ling ("Luke" and "John" in the 1987 revival and 2002 concert) — two Chinese "converts" and reformed gamblers who accompany Bishop Henry T. Dobson
- Ritz Quartette (1934 original) / Lady Fair Quartet (1987 revival)
- The Right Reverend Bishop Henry T. Dobson
- Reno's Angels (Purity, Chastity, Charity and Virtue) (1934 original and 1962 revival / 2002 concert and 2011 revival) — Reno's backing singers
- Ship's crew, passengers, reporters, photographers and F.B.I. agents

== Notable casts ==
Character	Broadway	West End	Off-Broadway Revival	First Broadway Revival	First U.S. National Tour	First West End Revival	Second U.S. National Tour	Second West End Revival	Second Broadway Revival	Third U.S. National Tour	First UK National Tour	Third London Revival	Second UK Tour
Character	1934	1935	1962	1987	1988	1989		2002	2011	2012	2015	2021	2022
Reno Sweeney	Ethel Merman	Jeanne Aubert	Eileen Rodgers	Patti LuPone	Leslie Uggams	Elaine Paige	Mitzi Gaynor	Sally Ann Triplett	Sutton Foster	Rachel York	Debbie Kurup	Sutton Foster	Kerry Ellis
Billy Crocker	William Gaxton	Jack Whiting	Hal Linden	Howard McGillin	Rex Smith	Howard McGillin	Scott Stevensen	John Barrowman	Colin Donnell	Erich Bergen	Matt Rawle	Samuel Edwards	Samuel Edwards
Moonface Martin	Victor Moore	Sydney Howard	Mickey Deems	Bill McCutcheon	Rip Taylor	Bernard Cribbins	Robert Nichols	Martin Marquez	Joel Grey	Fred Applegate	Hugh Sachs	Robert Lindsay	Denis Lawson
Hope Harcourt	Bettina Hall	Adele Dixon	Barbara Lang	Kathleen Mahony-Bennett	Rebecca Baxter	Ashleigh Sendin	Donna English	Mary Stockley	Laura Osnes	Alex Finke	Zoë Rainey	Nicole-Lily Baisden	Nicole-Lily Baisden
Lord Evelyn Oakleigh	Leslie Barrie	Peter Haddon	Kenneth Mars	Anthony Heald	Paul V. Ames	Martin Turner	Richard Sabellico	Simon Day	Adam Godley	Edward Staudenmayer	Stephen Matthews	Haydn Oakley	Haydn Oakley
Bonnie/Erma (Note: The name of Moonface's girlfriend's character has changed throughout the production's history)	Vera Dunn	Betty Kean	Margery Gray	Linda Hart	Susan Terry	Kathryn Evans	Dorothy Kiara	Annette McLauglin	Jessica Stone	Joyce Chittick	Alex Young	Carly Mercedes Dyer	Carly Mercedes Dyer
Elisha J. Whitney	Paul Everton	Richard Clarke	Warren Wade	Rex Everhart	Gordon Connell	Harry Towb	Gordon Connell	Denis Quilley	John McMartin	Dennis Kelly	Simon Rouse	Gary Wilmot	Simon Callow
Evangeline Harcourt	May Abbey	Diana Wilson	Mildred Chandler	Anne Francine	Julie Kurnitz	Ursula Smith	Evelyn Page	Susan Tracy	Jessica Walter	Sandra Shipley	Jane Wymark	Felicity Kendal	Bonnie Langford
Captain	John C. King	Henry Thompson	Neal Patrick	David Pursley	Kenneth Kantor	David Bacon	Kenneth Kantor	Paul Grunert	Walter Charles	Chuck Wagner	Bob Harms	Clive Hayward	Clive Hayward
Purser	Val Vestoff	Lance Lister	D. Bruce Rabbino	Gerry Vichi	Dale O'Brien	David Bexon	Dale O'Brien	Robin Soans	Robert Creighton	Jeff Brooks	Adam Dutton	Martin Callaghan	Cornelius Clarke
Bishop Dobson	Pacie Ripple	Frank Foster	Neal Patrick	Richard Korthaze	George Riddle	Brian Ellis	David Beckett	Anthony Cable	William Ryall	Gary Lindemann	Rohan Richards	Marc Akinfolarin	Eu Jin Hwang
Ching / Luke	Richard Wang	Ley On	Jeff Siggins	Stanford Egi	Alan Muraoka	Hi Ching	Marc C. Oka	Raymond Chai	Andrew Cao	Vincent Rodriguez III	Nick Len	Alistair So	Carl Au
Ling / John	Charlie Fang	Ah Woo Sing	Martin J. Cassidy	Toshi Toda	Ronald Yamamoto	John Shin	Alan Muraoka	Vao Chin	Raymond J. Lee	Marcus Shane	Andy Yau	Jon Chew	Trev Neo

== Musical numbers ==
=== Act I ===
- "Overture" – Orchestra
- "I Get a Kick Out of You" (follows "Friendship" in 1962) – Reno Sweeney
- "There's No Cure Like Travel (reinstated for 1987, 2011) / Bon Voyage" – Sailor, Girl and Ship's Crew and Company
- "All Through the Night" (follows "Blow, Gabriel, Blow" in 1962 and "Be Like The Bluebird" in 1987, 2011) – Billy Crocker, Hope Harcourt and Men
- "It's De-Lovely" (added in 1962, follows "Friendship" in 1987, 2011) – Billy Crocker and Hope Harcourt
- "Easy to Love" (reinstated for 1987, 2011) – Billy Crocker
- "Easy to Love (Reprise)" (added in 1987, 2011) - Hope Harcourt
- "I Want to Row on the Crew (The Crew Song)" (added in 1987, 2011) – Elisha J. Whitney
- "Sailor's Shanty (There'll Always Be A Lady Fair)" (cut in 1962, precedes "Friendship" in 1987, 2011) – The Foursome
- "Where Are the Men?" (only in 1934) – Bonnie and Girls
- "Heaven Hop" (only in 1962) - Bonnie and Girls
- "You're the Top" (precedes "Bon Voyage" in 1962 while following it in 1987, 2011) – Reno Sweeney and Billy Crocker
- "Sailor's Shanty (Reprise)" (only in 1934) - The Foursome
- "Friendship" (added in 1962, no Billy in 1987, 2011) – Reno Sweeney, Moonface Martin, and Billy Crocker
- "Anything Goes" – Reno Sweeney, the Foursome and Company
- "You're the Top (Reprise)" (only in 1934) - Reno Sweeney, Moonface Martin, and Billy Crocker

=== Act II ===
- "Entr'acte" – Orchestra
- "Public Enemy Number One" – Captain, Purser, Company
- "Let's Step Out" (only in 1962) – Bonnie and Company
- "Let's Misbehave" (only in 1962) – Reno Sweeney and Lord Evelyn Oakleigh
- "Blow, Gabriel, Blow" – Reno Sweeney and Company
- "Goodbye, Little Dream, Goodbye" (added in 1987, 2011) – Hope Harcourt
- "Be Like the Bluebird" – Moonface Martin
- "All Through the Night (Reprise)" (cut in 1987, 2011) – Billy Crocker and Hope Harcourt
- "I Get a Kick Out of You (Reprise)" (only in 1934) - Reno Sweeney
- "The Gypsy in Me" (cut in 1962, sung by Lord Evelyn Oakleigh in 1987, 2011) – Hope Harcourt and Girls
- "Take Me Back to Manhattan" (only in 1962) – Reno Sweeney and Angels
- "Buddie, Beware" (reinstated for 1987, 2011) – Erma Latour and Sailors
- "Finale (You're the Top / Anything Goes)" ("You're the Top" replaced by "I Get a Kick Out of You" in 1987 and "It's De-Lovely" in 2011) – Reno Sweeney and Ensemble

This chart shows all songs that were performed; placement of the songs varied. Source: Internet Broadway Database listing

1934 Original	1962 off-Broadway Revival	1987 and 2011 Revivals
"I Get a Kick Out of You"
Reno expresses her love to Billy in the bar at the beginning of Scene 1, reprised later near the show's end.	The song is sung towards the end of Act 1, when Reno realizes she is in love with Evelyn.	Same as 1934.
"(There's No Cure Like Travel) Bon Voyage"
The Sailors and guests board the ship, ready to depart, singing the "Bon Voyage" section of the song, but with no "There's No Cure Like Travel" portion.	Same as 1934.	The complete song is sung. ("There's No Cure Like Travel" was written for 1934, but later cut).
"You'd Be So Easy to Love"
Written for 1934, but cut during rehearsals.	—N/a	Here, Billy makes an advance on Hope. Although she turns him away, she secretly agrees with him.
"The Crew Song"
—N/a	—N/a	Originally written for a 1914 college show, Paranoia. Elisha J. Whitney prepares for a date with Mrs. Evangeline Harcourt and sings about his Yale days.
"Sailor's Chanty (There'll Always Be A Lady Fair)"
Sung by sailors during a scene change, and later reprised.	—N/a (however, an instrumental version of the song can be heard in the overture)	Same as 1934, with fewer verses and no reprise.
"Heaven Hop"
—N/a	Originally written for Paris, Bonnie attracts a group of sailors.	—N/a
"Where Are the Men?"
Bonnie attracts a group of sailors.	Replaced by "Heaven Hop".	—N/a
"You're the Top"
Billy convinces Reno to help him win Hope's heart (where "Friendship" would go in the revivals). There is also an encore of the song, totaling approximately six minutes.	Sung at the beginning of the show in place of "I Get a Kick Out of You" with fewer verses.	Sung as a pep-talk from Reno to a discouraged Billy, who then reciprocates from the second verse onwards.
"Friendship"
—N/a	Originally written for DuBarry Was a Lady; Reno, Billy, and Moonface sing about their strong bond	Similar to 1962, but only Reno and Moonface sing, and some alternate lyrics
"It's De-Lovely"
—N/a	Originally written for Red, Hot and Blue; Billy and Hope have a romantic moment where "All Through the Night" was in 1934 and "You'd Be So Easy to Love" was in 1987. They are joined by the sailors and women of the ship.	Sung later in the musical, near the Act I Finale. The sailors and women do not join in, and there is an extended dance sequence in the middle.
"Anything Goes"
Sung by Reno before the Act I Finale when she considers marrying Evelyn.	Ended Act I and sung about Billy as Snake Eyes, as well as Evelyn. Contained alternate lyrics.	Similar to 1962, but only about Billy as Snake Eyes, with more alternate lyrics. The 2011 version adds a verse not heard since 1962: "They think he's gangster number one, so they've made him their favorite son, and that goes to show: Anything Goes!"
"Act I Finale"
Whereas the revivals ended the act with "Anything Goes", the 1934 original had a scene where Hope rejects Billy, who is posing as Snake Eyes. Reno and Moonface try to cheer him up with a reprise of "You're the Top", to no avail. Billy is the hero of the ship to everyone but the girl he really wants.	Replaced by "Anything Goes".	Replaced by "Anything Goes".
"Public Enemy Number One"
After a marching-style intro by the sailor quartet, the song turns into a mock-hymn to Billy.	The opening verse is cut, leaving only the hymn, sung a cappella style with no instrumentals, unlike the other versions.	The introduction is back, sung by the Captain and Purser instead of the sailors, and also shortened a bit.
"Let's Step Out"
—N/a	Originally written for Fifty Million Frenchmen. Bonnie arouses the passengers after the "Public Enemy Number One" with a dance number.	—N/a
"Let's Misbehave"
—N/a	Originally written for Paris; realizing Billy is beyond her reach Reno sets her sights on Evelyn as he realizes he's not in love with Hope.	—N/a
"Blow, Gabriel, Blow"
Sung by Reno to cheer everyone up after Billy is arrested as an impostor.	Same as 1934.	Sung before Billy is arrested, as part of Reno's "sermon".
"Goodbye, Little Dream, Goodbye"
—N/a	—N/a	Originally written for Born to Dance, dropped from Red, Hot and Blue, first appears in O Mistress Mine. Sung by Hope after Billy is arrested, in which she realizes she's in love too late. An introductory verse absent in the 1987 revival was reinstated for the 2011 revival.
"Be Like the Bluebird"
Sung by Moonface to cheer up Billy in the brig.	Same as 1934 (missing a verse), but sung after "All Through the Night".	Same as 1934 (missing a verse).
"All Through the Night"
Sung by Billy and Hope on deck early in the show, where "It's De-Lovely" and "You'd Be So Easy to Love" went in revivals, with a chorus. Reprised when Hope visits Billy in the brig.	Same as the 1934 reprise.	Same as 1962, but with only Billy singing, complete with chorus.
"The Gypsy in Me"
Sung by Hope, letting her wild side out after Reno tells her that Billy will fight for her.	—N/a	Now sung by Evelyn to Reno, turning into a comedic song and dance number, wooing her with his wild side, and adding to the plot about his family's disturbing secret.
"Take Me Back to Manhattan"
—N/a	Originally written for The New Yorkers. Sung by a homesick Reno and her Angels.	—N/a
"Buddie Beware"
Sung by Reno during a scene change about her problems with men, replaced in later runs with a reprise of "I Get a Kick Out of You".	—N/a	Sung by Erma to the sailors who are in love with her. Fewer verses.
"Finale"
Reprises of "You're the Top" and "Anything Goes".	Same as 1934	Reprises of "I Get a Kick Out of You" and "Anything Goes". In the 2011 revival, the cast sings reprises of "It's De-Lovely" and "Anything Goes".

Cut songs

- "Waltz Down the Aisle" [dropped before the Boston tryout, later reworked by Porter as "Wunderbar" for Kiss Me, Kate] - Sir Evelyn and Hope Harcourt
- "What a Joy to Be Young" [dropped before the New York opening; alternate title: "To Be in Love and Young"] - Hope Harcourt
- "Kate the Great" [unused] - Reno Sweeney and Angels

== Notable productions ==
=== Broadway ===
The official Broadway debut was at the Alvin Theatre on November 21, 1934. It ran for 420 performances, becoming the fourth longest-running musical of the 1930s, despite the impact of the Great Depression on Broadway patrons' disposable income. The opening production was directed by Howard Lindsay with choreography by Robert Alton and sets by Donald Oenslager. Today, the show remains a frequently-revived favorite.

=== West End ===
Charles B. Cochran, a British theatrical manager, had bought the London performance rights during the show's Boston run, and he produced it at the West End's Palace Theatre. The musical opened on June 14, 1935, and ran for 261 performances. The cast included Jeanne Aubert as Reno Sweeney (the name changed to Reno La Grange, to suit Aubert's French background), Jack Whiting as Billy Crocker, and Sydney Howard as Moonface Martin. P. G. Wodehouse was engaged to replace the specifically American references in the book and lyrics with references more appropriate to an English audience.

=== 1962 Off-Broadway revival to 1987 Broadway revival ===
The production was revived in an Off-Broadway production in 1962, opening on May 15, 1962, at the Orpheum Theatre. It was directed by Lawrence Kasha with a cast that included Hal Linden as Billy Crocker, Kenneth Mars as Sir Evelyn, and Eileen Rodgers as Reno Sweeney. For this revival, the script was revised to incorporate several of the changes from the movie versions. Most changes revolved around the previously minor character Bonnie. This revision was also the first stage version of Anything Goes to incorporate several songs from other Porter shows: "Take Me Back to Manhattan" from The New Yorkers, 1930, "It's De-Lovely" from Red, Hot and Blue, 1936, "Friendship" from Du Barry Was a Lady, 1939, "Heaven Hop" and "Let's Misbehave" from Paris, 1928, and "Let's Step Out" from Fifty Million Frenchmen, 1929.

For the 1987 Broadway revival, John Weidman and Timothy Crouse (Russel's son) updated the book and re-ordered the musical numbers, using Cole Porter songs from other Porter shows, a practice which the composer often engaged in. This revival was rescored for a 16-piece swing band playing on stage, in the style of early Benny Goodman. This production opened at the Vivian Beaumont Theater, in Lincoln Center, on October 19, 1987, and ran for 784 performances. Directed by Jerry Zaks and choreographed by Michael Smuin, it starred Patti LuPone as Reno Sweeney, Howard McGillin as Billy, Bill McCutcheon as Moonface, and Anthony Heald as Lord Evelyn; Leslie Uggams and Linda Hart were replacement Renos. It was nominated for ten Tony Awards (including nominations for McGillin, LuPone, McCutcheon, and Heald), winning for Best Revival of a Musical, Best Featured Actor (McCutcheon), and Best Choreography. The production also won the Drama Desk Awards for Outstanding Revival of a Musical and Outstanding Actress (for LuPone).

=== 1989 West End revival and Australia ===
Elaine Paige, a British actress and singer, heard of the success of the 1987 Broadway production and made sure to attend a performance. After seeing the production herself, she was determined to bring it to London. To secure a place in the show's cast, Paige decided it was best she co-produced the show with her then-partner, lyricist Tim Rice. The London production opened in July 1989 at the Prince Edward Theatre. Paige starred as Reno Sweeney (she was replaced later in the run by Louise Gold). The original cast also starred Howard McGillin as Billy Crocker (who was replaced later in the show's run by John Barrowman), Bernard Cribbins as Moonface, and Kathryn Evans as Erma. The other principals included Ursula Smith, Martin Turner, and Ashleigh Sendin.

Jerry Zaks again directed the production, with scenic and costume design by Tony Walton, lighting by Paul Gallo, and sound by Tony Meola. The musical director was John Owen Edwards and the choreographer Michael Smuin.

The show transferred to Australia the same year and played in both Sydney and Melbourne, starring Geraldine Turner as Reno Sweeney, Peter Whitford as Moonface, Simon Burke as Billy Crocker, Marina Prior as Hope Harcourt, and Maggie Kirkpatrick as Evangeline Harcourt.

=== 2002–2003 Concert, London, and West End revivals ===
In April 2002, a one-night-only concert performance of the show was performed at the Vivian Beaumont Theater. Patti LuPone played Reno with Howard McGillin as Billy and Boyd Gaines as Lord Evelyn Oakleigh. LuPone and Gaines would later star together in the 2008 Broadway revival of Gypsy. The performance was directed and choreographed by Robert Longbottom with music supervision by David Chase and designs by Tony Walton.

The National Theatre revived the musical, which opened at the Olivier Theatre on December 18, 2002, and closed on March 22, 2003. The production then transferred to the West End at the Theatre Royal, Drury Lane, running from September 26, 2003 (in previews), through August 28, 2004. Directed by Trevor Nunn, it starred Sally Ann Triplett, John Barrowman, and Yao Chin (who is now a TV reporter). A cast recording of this production is available.

=== 2011 Broadway revival ===
A revival of the 1987 Broadway rewrite opened on April 7, 2011, at the Stephen Sondheim Theatre, produced by the Roundabout Theatre Company. Previews began on March 10, 2011. This production was directed and choreographed by Kathleen Marshall with musical supervision by Rob Fisher, dance arrangements by David Chase, and designs by Derek McLane, Martin Pakledinaz, and Peter Kaczorowski. This revival retained much of the 1987 orchestrations by Michael Gibson with some additions from arranger Bill Elliott.

The show's opening night cast featured Sutton Foster as Reno Sweeney, Joel Grey as Moonface Martin, Laura Osnes as Hope Harcourt, Jessica Walter as Evangeline Harcourt, Colin Donnell as Billy Crocker, Adam Godley as Sir Evelyn Oakleigh, John McMartin as Elisha Whitney, Jessica Stone as Erma, Robert Creighton as Purser, Andrew Cao as Luke, Raymond J. Lee as John, and Walter Charles as the Captain. The production was received generally very well by the critics and received a total of nine Tony Award nominations and ten Drama Desk Award nominations, including Best Actress in a Musical, Best Director of a Musical, and Best Revival of a Musical. The revival won the Drama Desk Awards and Tony Awards for Best Revival and Best Choreography, and Foster won the Drama Desk and Tony Awards for Best Actress in a Musical.

A cast recording of this production became available as a digital download on August 23, 2011, and it arrived in stores on September 20, 2011.

Stephanie J. Block took over for Sutton Foster as Reno Sweeney in a limited engagement (November 4–23, 2011) while Foster filmed a television pilot. Block permanently assumed the role on March 15, 2012, as Foster left the musical to take a role in a television series.

The production was originally scheduled to run through July 31, 2011, and was initially extended to April 29, 2012. It was extended two more times before closing on July 8, 2012, after 521 regular performances and 32 previews.

=== 2012 U.S. national tour ===
A national tour in the United States began in October 2012 at the Playhouse Square in Cleveland, Ohio, which was played more than 25 other major cities. Rachel York played Reno Sweeney. Other cast-members included Fred Applegate as Moonface Martin, Erich Bergen as Billy Crocker, Jeff Brooks as Purser, Joyce Chittick as Erma, Alex Finke as Hope Harcourt, Dennis Kelly as Elisha Whitney, Vincent Rodriguez III as Luke, Marcus Shane as John, Sandra Shipley as Mrs. Evangeline Harcourt, Edward Staudenmayer as Sir Evelyn Oakleigh, and Chuck Wagner as the Captain.

=== 2015 U.K. tour ===
The critically acclaimed Sheffield Theatres production directed by Daniel Evans began a UK and Ireland tour at the New Wimbledon Theatre on January 29, 2015, and was scheduled to visit 32 venues in its nine-month run. The production starred Debbie Kurup as Reno Sweeney and Matt Rawle as Billy Crocker with Hugh Sachs as Moonface Martin and Jane Wymark as Evangeline Harcourt until April 4, 2015, followed by Shaun Williamson and Kate Anthony, respectively, from April 6, 2015. The tour was cut short and ended at the Grand Opera House, Belfast on May 30, 2015.

=== 2015 Australian revival ===
An Australian revival was announced in September 2014 with the cast led by Caroline O'Connor as Reno Sweeney and featuring Todd McKenney, Alex Rathgeber, Claire Lyon, Wayne Scott Kermond, and Alan Jones. Jones was replaced in the role of the Captain by Gerry Connolly in Melbourne and Brisbane. The revival, directed by Dean Bryant, played in Melbourne, Brisbane, and Sydney, sequentially, running from June until November.

=== 2021 London revival and tour ===
A revival directed and choreographed by Kathleen Marshall, based on the 2011 Broadway production, opened for a limited season at the Barbican Theatre in London on August 4, 2021. The production repurposed the previous Broadway set designs by Derek McLane, sound design by Simon Baker, lighting design by Neil Austin and musical direction/supervision by Stephen Ridley. Previews began on July 23 and, following two extensions, the show closed on November 6, 2021.

Originally set to star Megan Mullally until she withdrew due to injury, Sutton Foster took over as Reno Sweeney in her London theatre debut. It also starred Robert Lindsay as Moonface Martin, Gary Wilmot as Eli Whitney and Felicity Kendal as Mrs. Harcourt. Foster and Kendal departed the production in October, and were replaced by Rachel York and Haydn Gwynne, respectively. The production received rave critical reviews, broke box office records at the Barbican, and received 9 Olivier Award nominations including Best Musical Revival the following year. During its run, the show was recorded for cinema distribution. This version was eventually shown on the Great Performances US television series on May 13, 2022.

After concluding its run at the Barbican, a UK and Ireland tour from April 2022 and a limited return to the Barbican from July 2022 were announced. The new cast featured Kerry Ellis as Reno Sweeney, Denis Lawson as Moonface Martin, Simon Callow as Eli Whitney, and Bonnie Langford as Mrs. Harcourt. Nicole-Lily Baisden, Samuel Edwards, Carly Mercedes Dyer and Hadyn Oakley reprised their performances from the London run.

=== Regional revivals ===
A high-profile co-production between Gateway Playhouse (Bellport, New York) and Ogunquit Playhouse starred Andrea McArdle as Reno Sweeney and Sally Struthers as Mrs. Harcourt. The production, which ran in May to June 4, 2016, featured the Derek McLane sets and Martin Pakledinaz costumes that were created for the 2011 Broadway revival, which was produced by the Roundabout Theatre Company. The production was directed by Jayme McDaniel and choreographed by Jason Wise.

In August 2024, there was a revival at The Muny. It starred Jeanna de Waal as Reno, Jay Armstrong Johnson as Billy, Kevin Chamberlin as Martin, George Abud as Lord Evelyn, Kimberly Immanuel as Hope, Adrianna Hicks as Erma, Ann Harada as Evangeline, Lara Teeter as Elisha, and Eric Jordan Young as the Captain. Marcia Milgrom Dodge will direct with choreography by Jared Grimes.

== Film versions ==
In 1936, Paramount Pictures turned Anything Goes into a movie musical. It starred Ethel Merman (the original Reno), with Bing Crosby in the role of Billy Crocker. Other cast members included Ida Lupino, Charles Ruggles, Arthur Treacher, and Grace Bradley. The director was Lewis Milestone. Among those contributing new songs were Hoagy Carmichael, Richard A. Whiting, Leo Robin, and Friedrich Hollaender.

The book was drastically rewritten for a second film version, also by Paramount, released in 1956. This movie again starred Crosby (whose character was renamed), and Donald O'Connor. The female leads were Zizi Jeanmaire and Mitzi Gaynor. The script departed significantly from the original story and was written by Sidney Sheldon. The lesser-known Porter songs were cut, and new songs, written by Jimmy Van Heusen and Sammy Cahn, were substituted.

A third version, directed by Ross MacGibbon and Kathleen Marshall, filmed live on stage during a performance of the 2021 London revival, follows the 2011 Broadway revival. This version was eventually shown on US television on PBS' Great Performances on May 13, 2022.

== Television versions ==
In 1950, the premiere episode of Musical Comedy Time featured a televised version of Anything Goes starring Martha Raye.

In 1954, Ethel Merman, at the age of forty-six, reprised her role as Reno in a specially adapted live television version of the musical, co-starring Frank Sinatra as the hero, now renamed Harry Dane; Merman's good friend Bert Lahr (who had co-starred with her on Broadway in DuBarry Was a Lady) as Moonface Martin; and Sheree North. This version was broadcast live on February 28, 1954, as an episode of The Colgate Comedy Hour, and has been preserved on kinescope. It used five of the original songs plus several other Porter numbers and retained the shipboard setting, but it had a somewhat different plot. It has been reported that Merman and Sinatra did not get along well. This version was released on DVD in 2011.

In 1962, a Norwegian language television movie adaptation starring Per Asplin and Anita Thallaug aired as part of the NRK series Lommeoperetten.

== Awards and nominations ==
=== 1987 Broadway revival ===
Year	Award	Category	Nominee	Result
1988	Tony Award	Best Revival		Won
1988	Tony Award	Best Performance by a Leading Actor in a Musical	Howard McGillin	Nominated
1988	Tony Award	Best Performance by a Leading Actress in a Musical	Patti LuPone	Nominated
1988	Tony Award	Best Performance by a Featured Actor in a Musical	Bill McCutcheon	Won
1988	Tony Award	Best Performance by a Featured Actor in a Musical	Anthony Heald	Nominated
1988	Tony Award	Best Direction of a Musical	Jerry Zaks	Nominated
1988	Tony Award	Best Choreography	Michael Smuin	Won
1988	Tony Award	Best Scenic Design	Tony Walton	Nominated
1988	Tony Award	Best Costume Design	Tony Walton	Nominated
1988	Tony Award	Best Lighting Design	Paul Gallo	Nominated
1988	Drama Desk Award	Outstanding Revival of a Musical		Won
1988	Drama Desk Award	Outstanding Actor in a Musical	Howard McGillin	Nominated
1988	Drama Desk Award	Outstanding Actress in a Musical	Patti LuPone	Won
1988	Drama Desk Award	Outstanding Featured Actor in a Musical	Bill McCutcheon	Nominated
1988	Drama Desk Award	Outstanding Featured Actor in a Musical	Anthony Heald	Nominated
1988	Drama Desk Award	Outstanding Director of a Musical	Jerry Zaks	Nominated
1988	Drama Desk Award	Outstanding Choreography	Michael Smuin	Won
1988	Drama Desk Award	Outstanding Orchestrations	Cole Porter	Nominated
1988	Drama Desk Award	Outstanding Costume Design	Tony Walton	Nominated
1988	Drama Desk Award	Outstanding Set Design	Tony Walton	Nominated
1988	Drama Desk Award	Outstanding Lighting Design	Paul Gallo	Nominated

=== 1989 West End revival ===
Year	Award	Category	Nominee	Result
1989	Laurence Olivier Award	Best Actress in a Musical	Elaine Paige	Nominated

=== 2002 London revival ===
Year	Award	Category	Nominee	Result
2002	Laurence Olivier Award	Outstanding Musical Production		Won

=== 2011 Broadway revival ===
Year	Award	Category	Nominee	Result
2011	Tony Award	Best Revival of a Musical		Won
2011	Tony Award	Best Performance by a Leading Actress in a Musical	Sutton Foster	Won
2011	Tony Award	Best Performance by a Featured Actor in a Musical	Adam Godley	Nominated
2011	Tony Award	Best Direction of a Musical	Kathleen Marshall	Nominated
2011	Tony Award	Best Choreography	Kathleen Marshall	Won
2011	Tony Award	Best Scenic Design	Derek McLane	Nominated
2011	Tony Award	Best Costume Design	Martin Pakledinaz	Nominated
2011	Tony Award	Best Lighting Design	Peter Kaczorowski	Nominated
2011	Tony Award	Best Sound Design	Brian Ronan	Nominated
2011	Drama Desk Award	Outstanding Revival of a Musical		Won
2011	Drama Desk Award	Outstanding Actor in a Musical	Colin Donnell	Nominated
2011	Drama Desk Award	Outstanding Actress in a Musical	Sutton Foster	Won
2011	Drama Desk Award	Outstanding Featured Actor in a Musical	Adam Godley	Nominated
2011	Drama Desk Award	Outstanding Featured Actress in a Musical	Laura Osnes	Nominated
2011	Drama Desk Award	Outstanding Director of a Musical	Kathleen Marshall	Nominated
2011	Drama Desk Award	Outstanding Choreography	Kathleen Marshall	Won
2011	Drama Desk Award	Outstanding Costume Design	Martin Pakledinaz	Nominated
2011	Drama Desk Award	Outstanding Sound Design	Brian Ronan	Won
2011	Drama Desk Award	Outstanding Set Design	Derek McLane	Won
2011	Outer Critics Circle Award	Best Revival of a Musical		Won
2011	Outer Critics Circle Award	Best Actress in a Musical	Sutton Foster	Won
2011	Outer Critics Circle Award	Best Featured Actor in a Musical	Adam Godley	Won
2011	Outer Critics Circle Award	Best Featured Actor in a Musical	Colin Donnell	Nominated
2011	Outer Critics Circle Award	Best Featured Actor in a Musical	John McMartin	Nominated
2011	Outer Critics Circle Award	Best Featured Actress in a Musical	Laura Osnes	Nominated
2011	Outer Critics Circle Award	Best Direction of a Musical	Kathleen Marshall	Nominated
2011	Outer Critics Circle Award	Best Choreography	Kathleen Marshall	Won
2011	Astaire Award	Best Dancer on Broadway	Sutton Foster	Won
2012	Grammy Award	Best Musical Show Album		Nominated

=== 2021 London revival ===
Year	Award	Category	Nominee	Result
2022	Laurence Olivier Award	Best Musical Revival		Nominated
2022	Laurence Olivier Award	Best Actor in a Musical	Robert Lindsay	Nominated
2022	Laurence Olivier Award	Best Actress in a Musical	Sutton Foster	Nominated
2022	Laurence Olivier Award	Best Actor in a Supporting Role in a Musical	Gary Wilmot	Nominated
2022	Laurence Olivier Award	Best Actress in a Supporting Role in a Musical	Carly Mercedes Dyer	Nominated
2022	Laurence Olivier Award	Best Director	Kathleen Marshall	Nominated
2022	Laurence Olivier Award	Best Theatre Choreographer	Kathleen Marshall	Won
2022	Laurence Olivier Award	Best Costume Design	Jon Morrell	Nominated
2022	Laurence Olivier Award	Best Original Score or New Orchestrations	David Chase, Bill Elliott and Rob Fisher	Nominated
2022	WhatsOnStage Award	Best Musical Revival		Won
2022	WhatsOnStage Award	Best Supporting Actor in a Musical	Robert Lindsay	Nominated
2022	WhatsOnStage Award	Best Supporting Actress in a Musical	Carly Mercedes Dyer	Won
2022	WhatsOnStage Award	Best Choreography	Kathleen Marshall	Nominated

== Recordings ==
There are many popular cast recordings of the show, including:

- 1935 Original London cast
- 1936 Studio cast
- 1950 Studio recording with Mary Martin
- 1953 Studio cast
- 1954 Television cast
- 1956 Film cast
- 1962 Off Broadway revival cast Hal Linden
- 1969 London revival cast Marion Montgomery
- 1987 Broadway revival cast with Patti LuPone and Howard McGillin
- 1988 Studio cast with Kim Criswell conducted by John McGlinn
- 1989 Australian revival cast
- 1989 London revival cast with Elaine Paige
- 1995 Studio cast with Louise Gold
- 2003 London revival cast
- 2011 Broadway revival cast with Sutton Foster
