= Miriam Seegar =

American actress (1907–2011)

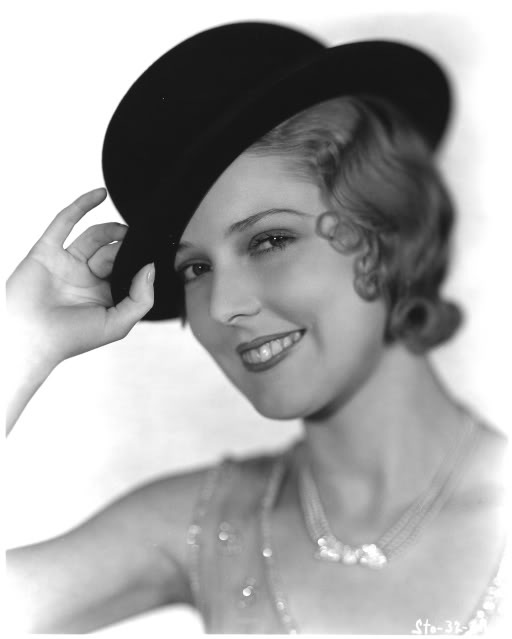
- Born: September 1, 1907; Greentown, Indiana, U.S.
- Died: January 2, 2011 (aged 103); Pasadena, California, U.S.
- Occupation: Film actress
- Years active: 1928–1933
- Spouse: Tim Whelan (m. 1931; died 1957)
- Children: 2
- Relatives: Sara Seegar (sister)

Miriam Seegar Whelan (September 1, 1907 – January 2, 2011) was an American actress in silent film and early sound films.

== Early life and film career ==
As the Seegar sisters started acting and singing, Frank Seegar left teaching to open a hardware store in efforts to support his daughters' growing singing and acting pursuits. Miriam Seegar made her Broadway debut in The Squall, replacing in the role of Anita in 1927.

Seegar then made her film debut in 1928 in The Price of Divorce, in which she starred alongside Frances Day and Rex Maurice. The film never was released, but was adapted for sound and released two years later as Such Is the Law. She followed that with a lead role in The Valley of Ghosts the same year. She starred in four films in 1929 and six films in 1930, including New Movietone Follies of 1930 and The Dawn Trail opposite Western film star Buck Jones. In 1931 and 1932, she made a total of six films, all B-movies.

== Later career ==
In 1953, she received her ASID certification and began working as an interior decorator, first with Harriet Shellenberger and later on her own. She did not retire until 1995.

In 2000, at the age of 93, Seegar appeared in the documentary I Used to Be in Pictures, which featured commentary from many of her contemporaries. Thereafter, she made a series of guest appearances at film festivals which culminated in an award for her screen work from the Memphis Film Festival when she was 95.

== Personal life and death ==
Whelan retired from acting in 1933, later marrying Tim Whelan, a director, with whom she had two sons. She later worked as an interior decorator. Her husband died in 1957, and decades later, both sons died within a span of nine months. Tim Whelan Jr. died from cancer in 1997, and Michael died in 1998.

On her 102nd birthday she sailed from Southampton to New York on the RMS Queen Mary 2 and back again. According to her daughter-in-law, Harriet Whelan, Seegar died on January 2, 2011, at the age of 103.

== Selected filmography ==
- The Price of Divorce (1928)
- The Love Doctor (1929)
- Seven Keys to Baldpate (1929 film) (1929)
- Clancy in Wall Street (1930)
- New Movietone Follies of 1930 (1930)
- What a Man! (1930)
- Such Is the Law (1930)
- Big Money (1930)
- The Dawn Trail (1930)
- The Woman Between (1931)
- Out of Singapore (1932)
- False Faces (1932)
