= Blossom Dearie (album) =

Studio album by Blossom Dearie
- Released: April 1957
- Recorded: September 11–12, 1956
- Genre: Jazz, cool jazz
- Label: Verve
- Producer: Norman Granz, Blossom Dearie

Blossom Dearie chronology
Blossom Dearie Plays "April in Paris" (1956)	Blossom Dearie (1957)	Give Him the Ooh-La-La (1958)

Professional ratings
Review scores
Source	Rating
AllMusic	4.5/5 stars
The Rolling Stone Jazz Record Guide	4/5 stars
The Penguin Guide to Jazz Recordings	3/4 stars

Blossom Dearie is an album by Blossom Dearie that was recorded in 1956 and released in 1957. It was her first recording for Verve.

== Background ==
Dearie recorded for the Barclay label in 1955 and 1956. This eponymous album was her next recording as a leader.

== Reception ==
Billboard noted that "hers is smoky sort of voice. and she handles a tune musically. Package embraces standards and offers thrush sultry moment or two via some French lyrics on "It Might As Well Be Spring," "Tout Doucement" and "Comment Alles Vous." "Thou Swell" it the best of the lot. This is the gal who organized and arranged for the Blue Stars in France. Their solo debut will attract some attention from hip jocks, but no great sales are foreseen."

In their review of the album, Cashbox commented that "Miss Dearie is a new name for the package trade. The stylist’s fragile, and intimate attack is persuasive and brightly phrased. The material is that commendable combination of the time-tested (“Thou Swell”) and the less well known pieces (“I Hear Music”) and the new (“Now At Last”). Herb Ellis (guitar), Ray Brown (bass), Jo Jones (drums) and Miss Dearie herself on the ivories."

In a positive retrospective review written for the CD release, AllMusic reviewer Scott Yanow praises Dearie's voice, writing its "sincerity and sense of swing wins one over after a few songs" and her "piano playing is first class".

In 2019, record club Vinyl Me, Please. reissued the album on vinyl. This was the first time the album was re-issued onto vinyl in the United States since its release.

== Track listings ==
1. "'Deed I Do" (Walter Hirsch, Fred Rose) – 2:11
2. "Lover Man (Oh Where Can You Be?)" (Jimmy Davis, Ram Ramirez, Jimmy Sherman) – 2:45
3. "Ev'rything I've Got" (Richard Rodgers, Lorenz Hart) – 2:27
4. "Comment allez-vous" (Murray Grand) – 2:10
5. "More Than You Know" (Edward Eliscu, Rose, Vincent Youmans) – 3:25
6. "Thou Swell" (Rodgers, Hart) – 2:59
7. "It Might as Well Be Spring" (Rodgers, Oscar Hammerstein II) (sung in French) – 3:09
8. "Tout doucement" (Emile Jean Mercadier, Rene Albert Clausier) – 2:21
9. "You for Me" (Bob Haymes) – 2:13
10. "Now at Last" (Haymes) – 3:20
11. "I Hear Music" (Burton Lane, Frank Loesser) – 2:05
12. "Wait Till You See Her" (Rodgers, Hart) – 3:19
13. "I Won't Dance" (Dorothy Fields, Hammerstein, Otto Harbach, Jerome Kern, Jimmy McHugh) – 2:44
14. "A Fine Spring Morning" (Haymes) – 3:04

CD reissue bonus tracks not included on the original 1957 release

1. "They Say It's Spring" (Marty Clark, Haymes) – 3:22
2. "Johnny One Note" (Rodgers, Hart) – 2:10
3. "Blossom's Blues" (Blossom Dearie) – 3:09

== Personnel ==
- Blossom Dearie – piano, vocals
- Herb Ellis – guitar
- Ray Brown – double bass
- Jo Jones – drums
