= The Price of Divorce =

1928 film

- Directed by: Sinclair Hill
- Written by: Reginald Fogwell (novel); Leslie Howard Gordon
- Produced by: Harcourt Temple
- Starring: Miriam Seegar; Wyndham Standing; Frances Day; Rex Maurice
- Cinematography: Desmond Dickinson
- Production company: Stoll Pictures
- Distributed by: Stoll Pictures
- Release date: 1928
- Country: United Kingdom
- Languages: Silent; English intertitles

The Price of Divorce is a 1928 British silent drama film directed by Sinclair Hill and starring Miriam Seegar, Wyndham Standing and Frances Day. The screenplay concerns a doctor's wife who wishes to marry her lover, and so concocts a charge of adultery against her husband in order to divorce him. The film was based on a novel by Reginald Fogwell. It was made at Cricklewood Studios by Stoll Pictures.

The Price of Divorce was never released as a silent film, but was adapted for sound and released two years later as Such Is the Law (1930).

== Cast ==
- Miriam Seegar as The Other Woman
- Wyndham Standing as The Doctor
- Frances Day as The Wife
- Rex Maurice as The Other Man
- Gibb McLaughlin as The Valet
- Johnny Ashby as The Child
- Nancy Price as The Aunt
- Frances Rose Campbell as The Nurse
- James Fenton as The Solicitor
- Charles Fancourt as The Butler
- George Butler as Counsel for the Defense

== Bibliography ==
- Low, Rachael. History of the British Film, 1918-1929. George Allen & Unwin, 1971.
