= Such Is the Law =

1930 film

- Trade advertisement
- Directed by: Sinclair Hill
- Screenplay by: Leslie Howard Gordon
- Produced by: Oswald Mitchell
- Starring: Frances Day; C. Aubrey Smith; Kate Cutler
- Cinematography: Desmond Dickinson
- Music by: Herbert Griffiths
- Production company: Stoll Pictures
- Distributed by: Butcher's Film Service
- Release date: November 1930
- Running time: 88 minutes
- Country: United Kingdom
- Language: English

Such Is the Law is a 1930 British drama film directed by Sinclair Hill and starring Frances Day, C. Aubrey Smith and Kate Cutler. It was written by Leslie Howard Gordon and made at Cricklewood Studios.

== Premise ==
A mother attempts to save her daughter's marriage.

== Cast ==
- Kate Cutler as mother
- Frances Day as wife
- Maud Gill as aunt's maid
- Carl Harbord as Vivian Fairfax
- Gibb McLaughlin as valet
- Nancy Price as aunt
- Miriam Seegar as other woman
- C. Aubrey Smith as Sir James Whittaker
- Wyndham Standing as doctor
- Lady Tree as granny
- Janice Adair as Marjorie Majoribanks
- Pamela Carme as Mrs Majoribanks
- Bert Coote as Sir George
- James Fenton as solicitor
- Rex Maurice as Philip Carberry

== Production ==
The film was adapted from the silent film The Price of Divorce (1928), also directed by Hill, which had not been released.

== Reception ==
Film Weekly wrote: "His film is for those who think, rather than for those who merely sit back and watch. It is a piece of work with a good central idea and an interesting method of treatment. ... The film is well acted by a good cast, mainly consisting of stage players. Sinclair Hill has told the story well, if slowly."

The Daily Film Renter wrote: "Questions of divorce and elopement providing strong human interest handled intelligently and acted skilfully in dual story. Fortunately, Sinclair Hill handles the medium with intelligence and skill, if at somewhat excessive length, and as the tale itself is intrinsically interesting and well acted, it succeeds in holding the attention well."
