= Dennis Kelly (actor) =

American actor (1943–2016)

Dennis Kelly (July 7, 1943 – May 29, 2016) was an American stage and television actor. His Broadway credits include the 2002 revival of Into the Woods, the 1999 revival of Annie Get Your Gun, and the 1994 revival of Damn Yankees.

== Acting credits ==
=== Stage ===
Year	Title	Role	Notes
1966	The Sound of Music	Herr Zeller	Regional
1967	Camelot	Sir Sagramore	Regional
1975	Carousel	Enoch Snow	Regional
1988-89	Follies	Benjamin Stone	Regional
1990	Follies	Benjamin Stone	Regional
1991	La Cage aux Folles	Georges	Regional
1994-95	Damn Yankees	Joe Boyd	Broadway
1995-97	Damn Yankees	Joe Boyd	US Tour
1997	Damn Yankees	Joe Boyd	West End
1999	Jekyll & Hyde	Sir Danvers Carew	2nd US Tour
1999	Annie Get Your Gun	Buffalo Bill / Col. William F. Cody	Broadway
2002	Into the Woods	Cinderella's Father u/s The Narrator / The Mysterious Man	Los Angeles (Pre-Broadway)
2002	Into the Woods	Cinderella's Father u/s The Narrator / The Mysterious Man	Broadway
2003-04	Urinetown	Senator Fipp	US Tour
2008	Caroline, or Change	Mr. Stopnick	Regional
2009	Man of La Mancha	The Governor / The Innkeeper	Regional
2011	Follies	Theodore Whitman	Regional
2012-13	Anything Goes	Elisha Whitney	US Tour
