= Out of Singapore =

1932 film

- Directed by: Charles Hutchison
- Written by: Frederick Chapin (story); Jack Natteford (screenplay)
- Produced by: Ken Goldsmith
- Starring: Noah Beery; Dorothy Burgess; Miriam Seegar
- Cinematography: Jacob A. Badaracco; Edward A. Kull
- Edited by: S. Roy Luby
- Production company: Goldsmith Productions
- Distributed by: Goldsmith Productions; First Division Pictures; William Steiner Films
- Release date: September 24, 1932
- Running time: 61 minutes
- Country: United States
- Language: English

Out of Singapore is a 1932 American pre-Code drama film directed by Charles Hutchison and starring Noah Beery, Dorothy Burgess and Miriam Seegar. The film was re-released by Astor Pictures in 1941 as Gangsters of the Sea.

== Plot ==
First Mate Woolf Barstow is a corrupt merchant marine officer crewing a cargo ship which sails the Manila-Singapore trade route. He and his henchmen intend to blow the vessel while it is off the coast of Luzon in order to collect the insurance premium.

== Cast ==
- Noah Beery Sr. as 1st Mate Woolf Bartstow
- Dorothy Burgess as Concha Renaldo
- Miriam Seegar as Mary Carroll Murray
- George Walsh as 2nd Mate Steve Trent
- Montagu Love as Capt. Scar Murray
- Jimmy Aubrey as Bloater, Drunken Sailor
- Horace B. Carpenter as Capt. Smith
- Olin Francis as Seaman Bill
- Leon Wong as Boss Wong
- Fred Toones as Snowball, the Ship's Cook
- Frank Hall Crane as Capt. Carroll (as Frank Crane)
- Ethan Laidlaw as 2nd Mate Miller (uncredited)

== Bibliography ==
- Pitts, Michael R. Astor Pictures: A Filmography and History of the Reissue King, 1933-1965. McFarland, 2019.
