= The Valley of Ghosts (film) =

1928 film

- Directed by: G. B. Samuelson
- Written by: Edgar Wallace (Novel and Screenplay)
- Produced by: S. W. Smith
- Starring: Miriam Seegar; Ian Hunter; Wallace Bosco; Derrick De Marney
- Production company: British Lion Film Corporation
- Distributed by: Jury Metro-Goldwyn
- Release date: December 1928
- Running time: 5,304 feet
- Country: United Kingdom
- Languages: Silent; English intertitles

The Valley of Ghosts is a 1928 British silent mystery film directed by G. B. Samuelson and starring Miriam Seegar, Ian Hunter and Leo Sheffield. It was an adaptation of the 1922 novel The Valley of Ghosts by Edgar Wallace. It was made at Beaconsfield Studios. It is currently a lost film.

== Cast ==
- Miriam Seegar - Stella Nelson
- Ian Hunter - Andrew McLeod
- Leo Sheffield - Kenneth Nelson
- Wallace Bosco - Derricus Merrivan
- Derrick De Marney - Arthur Wilmot
- George Bellamy -Sleepwalker

== Bibliography ==
- Low, Rachael. History of the British Film: Filmmaking in 1930s Britain. George Allen & Unwin, 1985 .
