= Between the Devil and the Deep Blue Sea (song) =

1931 song by Harold Arlen and Ted Koehler

Song by Cab Calloway
- Published: 1931 by Mills Music
- Songwriters: Harold Arlen and Ted Koehler

"Between the Devil and the Deep Blue Sea" is an American popular song published in 1931, with music by Harold Arlen and lyrics by Ted Koehler, and first recorded by Cab Calloway in 1931. It was introduced in the 1931 Cotton Club show Rhythmania and is now a widely recorded standard.

== Early hits ==
Joel Whitburn identified the most successful early recordings as being by:

1. Cab Calloway recorded October 21, 1931 for Brunswick Records (catalogue No. 6209)
2. Louis Armstrong performed a version featuring a trumpet solo which was recorded on January 25, 1932 and released by Columbia Records, catalogue No. 2600D.
3. The Boswell Sisters with The Dorsey Brothers (Recorded March 21, 1932, Brunswick Records, No. 6291)

== Other recordings ==
- Benny Goodman on The New Benny Goodman Sextet (1954)
- Blossom Dearie on Give Him the Ooh-La-La (1958)
- Thelonious Monk on Straight, No Chaser (1967)
- George Harrison on Brainwashed (2002)

== Film appearances ==
- 1933 Sing, Bing, Sing – Bing Crosby sang an abridged version of the song in this Mack Sennett short.
- 1969 They Shoot Horses, Don't They? – An instrumental version is played during one of the dance scenes.
- 1984 City Heat – sung by Eloise Laws.

== Broadway show ==
Featured in the 2013 show After Midnight.
