= The Dawn Trail =

1930 film by Christy Cabanne

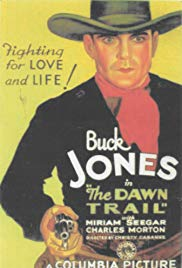
- Poster for the film
- Directed by: Christy Cabanne
- Screenplay by: John Thomas Neville
- Story by: Forrest Sheldon
- Produced by: Harry Cohn
- Starring: Marceline Day; Miriam Seegar; Charles Morton
- Cinematography: Ted McCord
- Edited by: James Sweeney
- Production company: Columbia Pictures
- Release date: November 28, 1930 (US)
- Running time: 66 minutes
- Country: United States
- Language: English

The Dawn Trail is a 1930 American Western film, directed by Christy Cabanne. It stars Marceline Day, Miriam Seegar, and Charles Morton, and was released on November 28, 1930. It was remade as the 1939 film Texas Stampede.

== Cast ==
- Buck Jones as Larry
- Miriam Seegar as June
- Charles Morton as Mart
- Erville Alderson as Denton
- Edward J. Le Saint as Amos
- Charles King as Skeets
- Hank Mann as Cock Eye
- Vester Pegg as Mac
- Slim Whitaker as Steve
- Charles Brinley as Nestor

== Production ==
In September 1930, it was announced that Christy Cabanne had been chosen to direct the film. It was to be the fourth installment in a series of eight pictures starring Buck Jones. In October it was revealed that Miriam Segar and Charles Morton had been added to the cast. A week later trade publications printed that Erville Anderson and Hank Mann, were also joining the production. In early November, Slim Whitaker and Edward J. Le Saint were announced as cast additions.

== Reception ==
The Film Daily reviewed the film positively, saying it was a "very good western with intelligent story well directed and action and suspense to the finish". They complimented the directing for including touches not normally seen in western films. They felt the story was well done, and not "just an excuse to hang the riding and fighting sequences on". They felt that Buck Jones showed he was one of the best western stars. Harrison's Reports also enjoyed the film, calling it a "very good melodrama, with fast action".
