= Martha Mears =

American actress and singer (1910–1986)

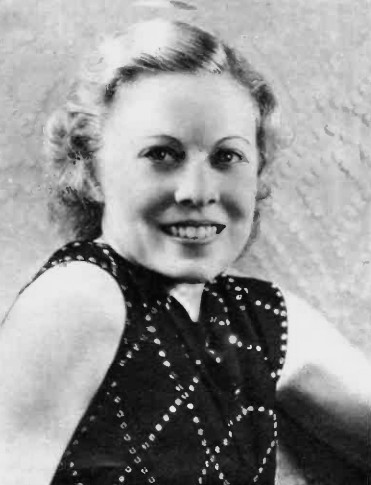
- Martha Mears as she was pictured in the July 1934 issue of Radio Stars magazine
- Born: Martha Marie Peters; July 18, 1910; Mexico, Missouri, US
- Died: December 13, 1986 (aged 76); Versailles, Missouri, US
- Education: University of Missouri
- Occupation: Singer

Martha Mears (July 18, 1910 – December 13, 1986) was a radio and film contralto singer, active from the 1930s to 1950s. She introduced in films original songs which have become standards, including "Long Ago (and Far Away)", and "My Foolish Heart". Her voice was also dubbed in Holiday Inn, introducing the famous Christmas standard White Christmas with Bing Crosby.

== Early years ==
Mears was born in Mexico, Missouri. Her mother died when Mears was 4 years old, and she went to live with her grandmother. Five years later, she began living with an aunt and uncle in Moberly, Missouri. She began taking singing lessons when she was 15.

She graduated from Moberly High School, Moberly Junior College and then, in 1933, from the University of Missouri with plans to be a teacher. On a post-graduation trip to New York City, however, her search for a teaching position was unsuccessful. Instead she found a job with Gus Edwards' Stars of Tomorrow show.

== Radio ==
Mears sang on KFRU in Columbia, Missouri, and on WIL in St. Louis, Missouri, before a 1934 interview led to a contract with NBC. She sang on such programs as Al Pearce and His Gang, The Baker's Broadcast (also known as The Joe Penner Show), It Happened in Hollywood, Ten-Two-Four Ranch, The Colgate House Party, The Old Gold Program, The General Foods Show, Bob Ripley, Phillip Morris, and Radio Rodeo.

During World War II, Mears was featured on several episodes of the Personal Album program produced by the Armed Forces Radio Service.

== Film ==
She was also the singing voice of many film actresses, notably singing for Marjorie Reynolds in the debut of "White Christmas" in the movie Holiday Inn (1942), for Rita Hayworth in Cover Girl and for one of Lucille Ball's songs in DuBarry Was a Lady (1943). Her other movie credits include dubbing the singing voices of actresses such as Claudette Colbert, Loretta Young, Hedy Lamarr, Veronica Lake, and Eva Gabor.

== Personal life ==
Mears was married to Sidney Brokaw, a violinist, and they had two sons.

== Partial filmography ==
- Half Angel (1951) ("Castle In The Sand" for Loretta Young)
- My Favorite Spy (1951) ("Just A Moment More" for Hedy Lamarr)
- Under The Gun (1951) ("I Cried For You" for Audrey Totter)
- My Foolish Heart (1949) (performer: "My Foolish Heart")
- The Countess of Monte Cristo (1948) ("Count Your Blessings", "Who Believes in Santa Claus" for Sonja Henie)
- Mr. Peabody and the Mermaid (1948) ("The Caribee" for Andrea King)
- The Saxon Charm (1948) ("I'm In The Mood For Love" for Audrey Totter)
- The Gangster (1947) ("Paradise" for Belita)
- Isn't It Romantic? (1948) ("Miss Julie July", "Indiana Dinner", "At the Nickolodeon" for Veronica Lake)
- Nocturne (1946) ("Nocturne", "Why Pretend", "A Little Bit is Better than None" for Virginia Huston)
- Meet Me On Broadway (1946) ("Fifth Avenue" for Marjorie Reynolds)
- Bring on the Girls (1945) ("You Moved Right In" for Marjorie Reynolds)
- Tonight and Every Night (1945) ("Tonight and Every Night", "What Does an English Girl Think of a Yank?", "You Excite Me", "The Boy I Left Behind", "Cry and You Cry Alone" for Rita Hayworth)
- Cover Girl (1944) ("The Show Must Go On", "Sure Thing", "Make Way for Tomorrow", "Long Ago (and Far Away)", "Poor John" for Rita Hayworth)
- DuBarry Was a Lady (1943) ("DuBarry Was a Lady", "Madame, I Like Your Crepe Suzettes" for Lucille Ball)
- Higher and Higher (1943) ("It's a Most Important Affair", "Today I'm a Debutante", "You're On Your Own", "Minuet in Boogie" for Michèle Morgan)
- Action in the North Atlantic (1943) ("Night and Day" for Julie Bishop)
- Silver Skates (1943) ("A Girl Like You, A Boy Like Me" for Patricia Morison)
- Two Tickets to London (1943) ("You Don't Know What Love Is" for Michèle Morgan)
- The Fallen Sparrow (1943) for Martha O'Driscoll
- They Got Me Covered (1943) ("Palsy Walsy" for Marion Martin)
- The Big Street (1942) ("Who Knows?" for Lucille Ball)
- Holiday Inn (1942) (performer: "White Christmas", "(Come To) Holiday Inn", "Happy Holidays", "Abraham" for Marjorie Reynolds)
- Star Spangled Rhythm (1942) ("A Sweater, a Sarong, and a Peek-a-Boo Bang" for Veronica Lake)
- This Gun for Hire (1942) ("I've Got You", "Now You See It, Now You Don't" for Veronica Lake)
- Call Out the Marines (1942) ("The Light of My Life", "Hands Across the Border" for Dorothy Lovett)
- Four Jacks and a Jill (film) (1942) ("Karanina", "You Go Your Way", "Wherever You Go" for Anne Shirley)
- South of Tahiti (1941) ("Melahi" for Maria Montez)
- The Parson of Panamint (1941) ("My Sweetheart's the Man in the Moon", "It's in the Cards", "Merry-Go-Round", "Rock of Ages" for Ellen Drew)
- Pacific Blackout (1941) ("I Met Him in Paris" for Eva Gabor)
- I Wanted Wings (1941) ("Born to Love" for Veronica Lake)
- Road Show (1941) ("I Should Have Known You Years Ago" for Carole Landis)
- Zaza (1938) ("Hello, My Darling" for Claudette Colbert)
