= The Valley of Ghosts (novel) =

1922 novel by Edgar Wallace

Dust jacket U.S. 1st edition, Small, Maynard & Co., New York, 1923

The Valley of Ghosts is a crime novel by the British writer Edgar Wallace which was first published in 1922.

The novel was originally serialised in The Popular Magazine, Jul 20-Sep 7, 1922, in four installments, and the first UK book edition was by Odhams Ltd., in London, in 1922. Small, Maynard & Company published the first US book edition, in New York, in 1923.

== Plot ==
Murder comes to a quiet settlement of the English countryside, and with more than one ghost. Why was Stella Nelson with the victim in the middle of the night, shortly before the murder? Who was the mysterious blackmailer who held all England in their grasp? Why didn't the famous detective, Andy MacLeod, do his duty?

== Film adaptation ==
In 1928 the novel was adapted into a silent film directed by G.B. Samuelson and starring Miriam Seegar and Ian Hunter. It was one of a number of adaptations of Wallace's novels in the late 1920s and early 1930s.
