= Give Him the Ooh-La-La (album) =

Studio album by Blossom Dearie
- Released: 1958
- Recorded: September 12–13, 1957
- Genre: Jazz
- Length: 42:10
- Label: Verve
- Producer: Norman Granz, Blossom Dearie

Blossom Dearie chronology
Blossom Dearie (1957)	Give Him the Ooh-La-La (1958)	Once Upon a Summertime (1959)

Professional ratings
Review scores
Source	Rating
AllMusic	4.5/5 stars
The Penguin Guide to Jazz	3/4 stars

Give Him the Ooh-La-La is a 1958 studio album by American jazz singer Blossom Dearie.

This album is the second of six albums Dearie recorded for Verve Records. This album follows up on the success of Dearie's first album, the eponymously titled Blossom Dearie.

== Track listings ==
1. "Just One of Those Things" (Cole Porter) – 2:03
2. "Like Someone in Love" (Johnny Burke, Jimmy Van Heusen) – 4:33
3. "Between the Devil and the Deep Blue Sea" (Harold Arlen, Ted Koehler) – 2:28
4. "They Say It's Spring" (Marty Clark, Bob Haymes) – 3:46
5. "Try Your Wings" (Michael Preston Barr, Dion McGregor) – 3:26
6. "Bang Goes the Drum (And You're In Love)" (David Heneker) – 3:24
7. "The Riviera" (Cy Coleman, Joseph Allen McCarthy) – 3:48
8. "The Middle of Love" (Maurice Goodman, Billie Wallington) – 2:35
9. "Plus je t'embrasse" (Ben Ryan, Max François) – 2:31
10. "Give Him the Ooh-La-La" (Porter) – 2:41
11. "Let Me Love You" (Bart Howard) – 2:44
12. "I Walk a Little Faster" (Coleman, Carolyn Leigh) – 4:18
  CD reissue bonus tracks not included on the original 1958 release:
13. "Give Him the Ooh-La-La" (Alternate Take #1) – 2:45
14. "Give Him the Ohh-La-La" (Alternate Take #2) – 1:50

== Personnel ==
- Blossom Dearie – vocals, piano
- Ray Brown – double bass
- Jo Jones – drums
- Herb Ellis – guitar

== Charts ==
Chart performance for Give Him the Ooh-La-La
Chart (2026)	Peak position
Greek Albums (IFPI)	76
