= Give Him the Ooh-La-La (song) =

1939 song

"Give Him the Ooh-La-La" is a 1939 popular song written by Cole Porter, for his musical DuBarry Was a Lady, where it was introduced by Ethel Merman.

The song was performed by Carol Burnett in one of her earliest TV appearances in 1956, as part of the Omnibus program The American Musical Comedy.

It became the title track of Blossom Dearie's 1958 album with the same name.

== Notable recordings ==
- Blossom Dearie - Give Him the Ooh-La-La (1958)
- Cybill Shepherd - Cybill Does It... ...To Cole Porter (1974)
