= Frances Day =

American actress and singer (1907–1984)

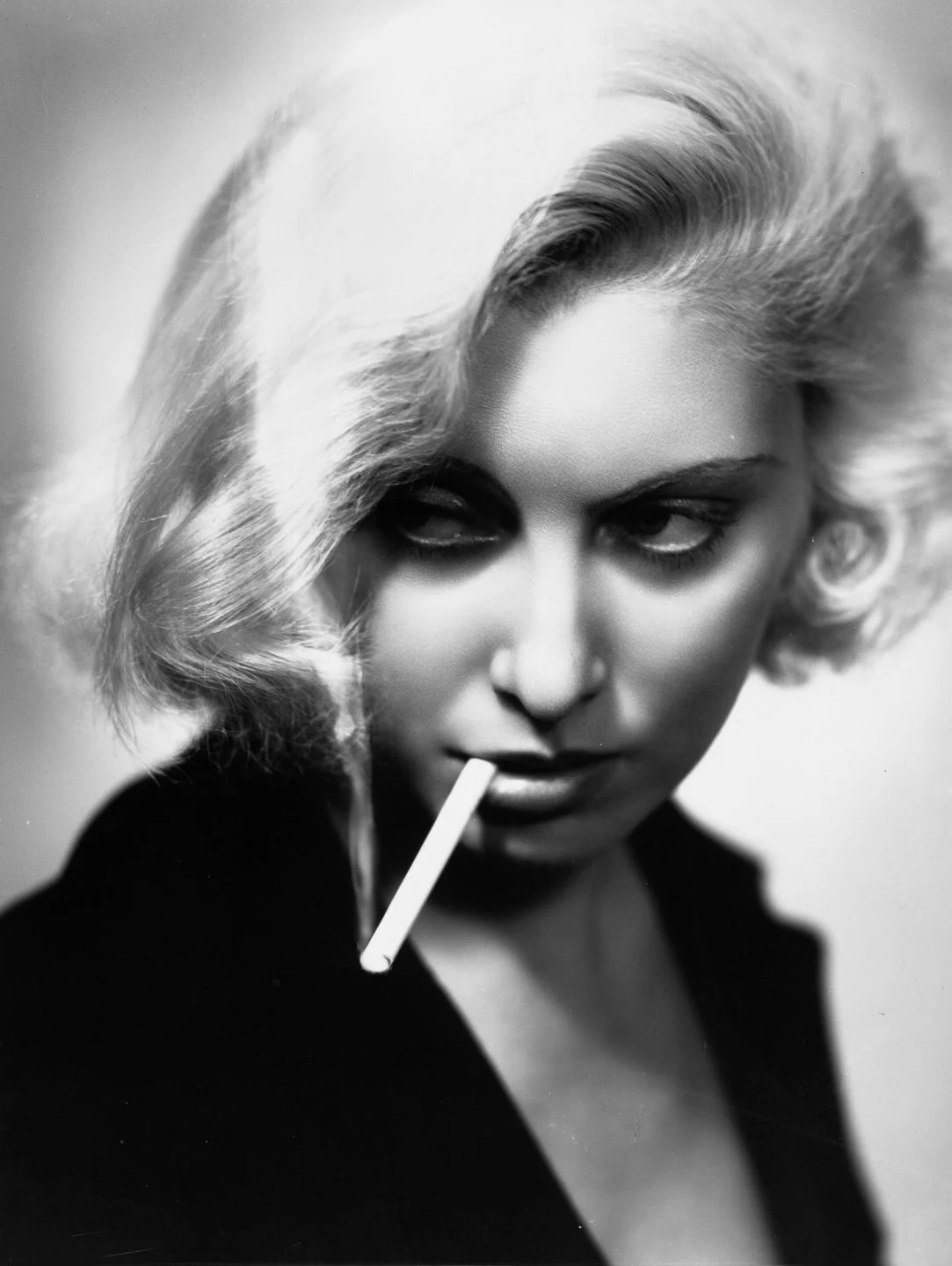
- Frances Day, circa 1935
- Born: Frances Victoria Schenk; December 16, 1907; East Orange, New Jersey, U.S.
- Died: April 29, 1984 (aged 76); Windsor, Berkshire, England
- Occupations: Actress, singer
- Spouse: Beaumont Alexander (m. 1927; div. 1938)

Frances Day (born Frances Victoria Schenk; December 16, 1907 – April 29, 1984) was an American actress and singer who achieved great popularity in the UK in the 1930s.

Her career began as a nightclub cabaret singer in New York City and London. She made her London stage debut as a double act at the New Cross Empire with the dancer John Mills (later a distinguished actor), billed as "Mills and Day". This led to a chorus role in the 1929 West End production of The Five O'Clock Girl at the Hippodrome, which toured the provinces in 1930. She married Beaumont Alexander, an Australian agent and publicist in London, in 1927. He masterminded her early career as a dancer in West End nightclubs, where she created favourable notoriety by performing in a G-string with only an ostrich fan for cover. The couple divorced in 1938, and she never remarried.

== Later years ==
She acted regularly in films until 1941, and appeared on the London stage in musical revues like Cole Porter's Black Vanities (1941, in which she sang with Bud Flanagan). In the 1950s she made only four films but found a new career as a regular panelist on the British version of What's My Line?, which ran from July 16, 1951, until May 13, 1963.

She was also a close "theatrical" friend of the Mayfair heiress Dorothy Hartman, owner of Lendrum & Hartman Limited, the major distributor of Buick and Cadillac cars in London. She was a regular guest at her country home – Stumblehole Farm, Dean Oak Lane, near Leigh in Surrey.

== Death ==
She died of chronic myeloid leukemia, aged 76, in Windsor, Berkshire, after retreating into reclusion in Maidenhead when her career and public life ended. She left what remained of her estate to a young solicitor, Howard McBrien, in her handwritten will, which included the following directive:

[That] there be no notice or information of any kind of my death, except for and if a death certificate is obligatory. Any persons, private or Press, you shall simply say that I am no longer at this address. "Gone away. Destination unknown", and that is the truth.

== Discography ==
- "Ooh! That Kiss" (1932)
- "Happy-Go-Lucky-You" (1932)
- "Now You're Here" (1933)
- "It's Best to Forget" (1933)
- "Excuse Me" (1934)
- "Did You Ever See a Dream Walking?" (1934)
- "Let's Lay Our Heads Together" (1935)
- "I'd Do the Most Extraordinary Things" (1935)
- "Pardon My English" (1935)
- "Dancing With a Ghost" (1935)
- "Swing" (1936)
- "Me and My Dog" (1936)
- "A Little White Room" (1937)
- "Artificial Flowers" (1937)
- "Because You Are You" (1937)
- "Midnight and Music" (1937)
- "I've Got You Under My Skin" (1937)
- "Easy to Love" (1937)
- "Whispers in the Dark" (1937)
- "I Will Pray" (1937)
- "How Do You Do, Mr. Right?" (1938)
- "It's D'Lovely" (1938)
- "But in the Morning, No!" (1941)
- "It's D'Lovely" (1941)
- "Underneath the Arches" (1941)
- "Do I Love You?" (1941)
- "I L-L-Love You So" (1941)
- "Much More Lovely" (1941)
- "A Pair of Silver Wings" (1941)
- "The Wheels of Love" (1955)
- "Why Did the Chicken Cross the Road?" (1955)
- "Met Rock" (1956)
- "Heartbreak Hotel" (1956)

== Stage credits ==
- Out of the Bottle (1932)
- How D'You Do? (1933)
- Jill Darling (1934)
- Floodlight (1937)
- The Fleet's Lit Up (1938)
- Black and Blue (1939)
- Black Vanities (1941)
- DuBarry Was a Lady (1942)
- Evangeline (1946)
- Buoyant Billions (1949)
- Latin Quarter (1949)

== Filmography ==
- The Price of Divorce (1928)
- Such Is the Law (1930)
- Big Business (1930)
- "O.K. Chief" (1931) – BIP short
- The First Mrs. Fraser (1932)
- The Girl from Maxim's (1933)
- Two Hearts in Waltz Time (1934)
- Temptation (1934)
- Oh, Daddy! (1935)
- You Must Get Married (1936)
- Public Nuisance No. 1 (1936)
- Dreams Come True (1936)
- Who's Your Lady Friend? (1937)
- The Girl in the Taxi (1937)
- Kicking the Moon Around (1938)
- Room for Two (1940)
- Fiddlers Three (1944)
- Buoyant Billions (1949) – BBC TV movie, based on play
- Call It a Day (1950) – BBC TV special
- A Summer's Day (1950) – BBC TV special
- Tread Softly (1952)
- There's Always a Thursday (1957)
- "The Witching Hour" (1958) – episode of Armchair Theatre
