= Du Barry Was a Lady =

1939 Broadway musical

- 1939 original Broadway production playbill cover
- Music: Cole Porter
- Lyrics: Cole Porter
- Book: Herbert Fields and Buddy DeSylva
- Productions: 1939 Broadway; 1942 West End; 1993 and 2001 London staged concert 1996 Encores!

Du Barry Was a Lady is a Broadway musical, with music and lyrics by Cole Porter, and the book by Herbert Fields and Buddy DeSylva. The musical starred Bert Lahr, Ethel Merman and Betty Grable, and the song "Friendship" was one of the highlights. The musical was made into the 1943 Technicolor film Du Barry Was a Lady, starring Red Skelton, Lucille Ball, Gene Kelly, and Tommy Dorsey and his orchestra.

== Plot ==
A washroom attendant, Louis Blore, has won a sweepstakes, and subsequently quits his job. He is in love with the nightclub singer May Daly, but she is in love with Alex Barton. Alex is the brother of her friend Alice, who is in love with Harry Norton. Meanwhile, Alex is unhappily married to Ann. Charley, Louis's replacement, suggests that Louis slip Alex a Mickey Finn. While trying to do so, Louis inadvertently drinks the Mickey Finn, falls asleep, and dreams he is King Louis XV of France, and that May is Madame du Barry.

In his dream, Charley becomes the Dauphin (later Louis XVI) and Harry becomes the captain of the guard, with Ann as Du Barry's lady-in-waiting, and Alex as a peasant who wrote a rude song about The King and Du Barry (the title song: "Du Barry Was a Lady"). Eventually after various entanglements (including the Dauphin's shooting the King in the posterior with a bow and arrow), Louis wakes up and realizes that Alex is the man for May. He uses the last of his winnings to pay for Alex's divorce from Ann, and (with Charley having just quit his job) goes back to being a washroom attendant.

== Productions ==
=== 1939 Broadway ===
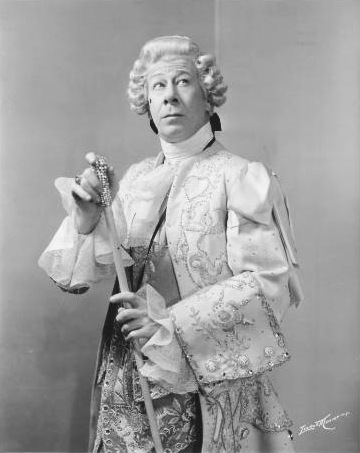
Bert Lahr in the original Broadway production of Du Barry Was a Lady (1939)

The musical opened on Broadway at the 46th Street Theatre on December 6, 1939, transferred to the Royale Theatre on October 21, 1940 and closed December 12, 1940, after 408 performances. It was directed by Edgar MacGregor, choreographed by Robert Alton, with the orchestrations of Robert Russell Bennett and Ted Royal. The cast featured Bert Lahr as Louis Blore, Ethel Merman as May Daly, Betty Grable as Alice Barton, Benny Baker as Charley, Ronald Graham as Alex Barton and Charles Walters as Harry Norton. Gypsy Rose Lee and Frances Williams later played the part of May Daly.

=== West End ===
The show opened in the West End at Her Majesty's Theatre on 22 October 1942 and ran for 178 performances. It was directed by Richard Bird. The cast featured Arthur Riscoe as Louis Blore, Frances Day as May Daly, Frances Marsden as Alice Barton, Jacky Hunter as Charley, Bruce Trent as Alex Barton and Teddy Beaumont as Harry Norton.

=== Later productions ===
The show has been produced in concert form in both the United States and the United Kingdom. The two London productions, in 1993 and 2001, were by the Discovering Lost Musicals Charitable Trust and featured Louise Gold as May Daly with Barry Cryer as Louis in 1993 and Desmond Barrit in 2001. The May 1993 production was at the Barbican Centre. The November 2001 concert was (like the original London production) at Her Majesty's Theatre, recorded for radio by the BBC (it was broadcast on BBC Radio 3 during Christmas 2002).

New York City Center Encores! presented a staged concert in February 1996 with Robert Morse (Louis) and Faith Prince (May). New York's Musicals Tonight! presented a production March–April, 2017.

The song "Give Him the Ooh-La-La" was performed by Carol Burnett in one of her earlier TV appearances in 1956 as part of the Omnibus program The American Musical Comedy.

The show later appeared on the BBC Radio with Louise Gold and Desmond Barrit singing the lead roles.

Du Barry Was a Lady received a fully staged production in May 2014 by San Francisco's 42nd Street Moon Company starring Bruce Vilanch in the Bert Lahr role, directed and choreographed by Zack Thomas Wilde.

== Casts ==
	Original Broadway (1939)	National Tour (1940)	Original London (1942)	Encores! (1996)
May Daly/Mme. La Comtesse du Barry	Ethel Merman	Frances Williams	Frances Day	Faith Prince
Louis Blore/His Most Royal Majesty, The King of France	Bert Lahr		Arthur Riscoe	Robert Morse
Harry Norton/Capt. of the King's Guard	Charles Walters	David Shelley	Teddy Beaumont	Scott Waara
Alice Barton/Mme La Marquise Alisande De Vernay	Betty Grable	Ruth Bond	Frances Marsden	Liz Larsen
Vi Hennessey/Mme. La Duchesse De Villardell	Jean Moorehead	Sunny Rice	Inga Andersen	Ruth Williamson
Bill Kelly/Le Duc De Choiseul	Walter Armin	Oscar Ragland		Bruce Adler
Alex Barton/Alixe	Ronald Graham		Bruce Trent	Burke Moses
Charley/His Royal Highness, Dauphin of France	Benny Baker		Jackie Hunter	Michael McGrath

== Songs ==
In an early shared credit, the songwriting duo of Hugh Martin and Ralph Blane handled the vocal arrangements for the original Broadway production.

Act I

- Where's Louie? – Ensemble
- Ev'ry Day's a Holiday – Harry Norton, Alice Barton and Ensemble
- It Ain't Etiquette – His Most Royal Majesty, The King of France and Vi Hennessey
- When Love Beckoned – Mme. La Comtesse du Barry
- Come On In – Mme. La Comtesse du Barry and Ensemble
- Dream Song – Four Internationals
- Mesdames and Messieurs – Dames de la Coeur
- Gavotte – Alice Barton and Ensemble
- But in the Morning, No! – Mme. La Comtesse du Barry and His Most Royal Majesty, The King of France
- Do I Love You? – Alex Barton and Mme. La Comtesse du Barry
- Do I Love You (Reprise) – Mme. La Comtesse du Barry and Zamore
- Du Barry Was a Lady – Entire Company

Act II

- Give Him the Ooh-La-La – Mme. La Comtesse du Barry
- Well, Did You Evah! – Alice Barton and Harry Norton
- It Was Written in the Stars – Alex Barton and Ensemble
- L'Apres Midi d'un Boeuf – Charley and Zamore
- Katie Went to Haiti – Mme. La Comtesse du Barry and Ensemble
- Katie Went to Haiti (Reprise) – Alex Barton and Mme. La Comtesse du Barry
- Friendship – Mme. La Comtesse du Barry and His Most Royal Majesty, The King of France

== Reception ==
Brooks Atkinson wrote in The New York Times: "Although Miss Merman is jaunty and Mr. Lahr is funny, they have a hard time keeping this show merry. The authors have struck a dead level of Broadway obscenity that does not yield much mirth. As the music-maker Mr. Porter has written a number of accomplished tunes in the modern idiom and one excellent romantic song, "Do I Love You?" but the lyrics are no more inspired than the book; they treat all humor as middling. The performers supply more pleasure than the authors and composer. Betty Grable and Charles Walters, who would also be featured in a free society, dance and sing with remarkable dash."

Life praised the performers, especially Betty Grable "who can dance and sing like a May breeze" and Merman and Lahr "two musical comedy veterans...in top form."

== Film ==
The film was released by MGM on May 30, 1943. It was directed by Roy Del Ruth. It used very little of the original Cole Porter score.
