= Daddy longlegs =

Daddy longlegs or daddy long legs may refer to:

== Life forms ==
=== Animals ===
- Opiliones or harvestmen, an order of arachnids
- Pholcidae or cellar spiders, a family of spiders
- Crane fly, a family of insects in the order Diptera

=== Plants ===
- Stylidium divaricatum, a species of triggerplant native to Western Australia
- Caladenia filamentosa, a species of orchid native to Eastern Australia
- Brassavola cucullata, a species of orchid native to Mexico

== Literature and film ==
- Daddy-Long-Legs (novel), by Jean Webster
- Daddy-Long-Legs (play), by Jean Webster, adapted from her novel
  - Daddy-Long-Legs (1919 film), a silent comedy-drama starring Mary Pickford
  - Daddy Long Legs (1931 film), a musical starring Janet Gaynor and Warner Baxter
  - Daddy Long Legs (1938 film), a Dutch romantic comedy
  - Daddy Long Legs (1955 film), a musical starring Fred Astaire
  - Daddy-Long-Legs (2005 film), a Korean romance
  - Daddy Long Legs (musical), 2009, play by John Caird and Paul Gordon
- Daddy Longlegs (2009 film), an American comedy-drama by Ben and Joshua Safdie
- "Old Father Longlegs", a nursery rhyme by Mother Goose

== Music ==
- Daddy Long Legs (musician), in Wolfpac and Bloodhound Gang
- Daddy Longlegs (album), by John Craigie
- "Daddy Longlegs", a 1993 song by Tumbleweed
- "Daddy Longlegs", a 2017 song by McCafferty

== Other uses ==
- Daddy Long Legs (horse) (born 2009), a Thoroughbred racehorse
- Daddy Long Legs (sculpture), 2006, in Portland, Oregon
- Pioneer, a car on the former Brighton and Rottingdean Seashore Electric Railway
