= Daddy Long Legs (1938 film) =

1938 film

Vadertje Langbeen
- Directed by: Frederic Zelnik
- Written by: Rudolf Bernauer (scenario), Cor Hermus (dialogue)
- Release date: 6 October 1938
- Running time: 89 minutes
- Country: Netherlands
- Language: Dutch

Daddy Long Legs or Vadertje Langbeen is a 1938 Dutch romantic comedy film directed by Frederic Zelnik, based on Jean Webster's 1912 novel of the same name - one of several adaptations of that book (see below).

== Plot ==
Judy Aalders grows up in a strict orphanage, supervised by Mrs. Lippens. Although all the other orphans look up to her, she suffers from the heavy existence. The only way she gets through her long working days is her dreams of a better future. During an inspection, she is blamed for making a mocking drawing. She denies being responsible for the mischief and says she feels she has lived in prison all her life.

Director Woudenberg witnesses her confrontation against the board and shows sympathy. He decides to adopt her and offers her the opportunity to study. She is very grateful to him and although she does not know his real name and is never allowed to see him, she affectionately calls him Father Long Leg. During her studies she befriends roommates Ina Donkers and Doris van Woudenberg, a niece of Albert. Unlike her fellow students, Judy is very ambitious. She aspires to a career as a successful writer. She is regularly visited by Mrs. Van Dedum, whom she sees as a mother figure. As a thank you, Judy sends many letters about her progress, but later also about private matters.

Albert is offended when she reveals in one of her letters that she thinks it is an old man. He arranges a meeting with her through contact person Van Dedum and keeps his identity secret. They immediately fall for each other like a rock. He seduces her at a party, where they can hardly resist each other. This causes jealousy among Frits Donkers, Ina's brother and Judy's silent lover. He tries to make her jealous by dancing with Doris, but is unsuccessful.

As they get to know each other, Judy and Albert fall in love more and more. Although she regularly tells him about Father Long Leg, he is still determined to keep his true identity a secret. Through his alias he helps her with the publication of her new book. She receives 1000 guilders, which she uses as an installment for her studies and as a donation for the children in the orphanage.

At one point Albert makes a marriage proposal, but Judy thinks she's not good enough for him and declines. Albert leaves devastated and gets involved in a minor car accident. Later, he reads a letter she sent to Longleg, in which she confides in him the reason for her rejection. She is looking for someone who can support her and would love to meet Longleg in person. She visits his house, where she discovers who the man behind Father Long Leg is. She realizes that he loves her and doesn't care about her parentage. They reunite and Albert announces their engagement.

== Cast ==
- Lily Bouwmeester ... Judy Aalders
- Paul Storm ... Albert van Woudenberg / Vadertje Langbeen
- Emma Morel ... Mevr. Van Dedum
- Gusta Chrispijn-Mulder ... Mevr.Lippens
- Sara Heyblom ... Mevr. Van Woudenberg
- Heleen Pimentel ... Doris van Woudenberg
- Jan Retèl ... Student Frits Donkers
- Lies de Wind
- Lau Ezerman
- Aaf Bouber
- Herman Bouber
- Joke Bosch (as Joke Busch)
- Constant van Kerckhoven Jr.
- Peronne Hosang
- Bob De Lange

== See also ==
Other versions of the Jean Webster novel:

- Daddy-Long-Legs (1919 film), with Mary Pickford
- Daddy Long Legs (1931 film), with Janet Gaynor
- Curly Top (film), 1935 film with Shirley Temple based on the novel
- Daddy Long Legs (1955 film) with Leslie Caron
- My Daddy Long Legs (1990) Japanese anime television series
- Daddy-Long-Legs (2005 film), 2005 Korean film
