= Dear Enemy =

Dear Enemy may refer to:

- Dear Enemy (band), a 1980 indie pop band
- Dear Enemy (film), a 2011 Chinese film
- Dear Enemy (novel), a 1915 novel by Jean Webster and sequel to 1912's Daddy-Long-Legs (novel)
  - Dear Enemy (TV series) the 1981 televised adaptation of the story, with 7 episodes
- "Dear Enemy", a 1971 episode of the television series Hawaii Five-O

== See also ==
- Dear enemy effect
- Dearest Enemy, a 1925 musical by Rodgers and Hart and Herbert Fields
