= Love from Judy =

British musicals

- Original West End cast recording cover
- Music: Hugh Martin
- Lyrics: Jack Gray; Hugh Martin
- Book: Eric Maschwitz; Jean Webster
- Basis: Daddy Long Legs by Jean Webster
- Productions: 1952 West End

Love from Judy is a musical with music by Hugh Martin, lyrics by Martin and Jack Gray, and a book by Eric Maschwitz and Jean Webster. It is based on Webster's novel and play Daddy-Long-Legs. The original production opened in Coventry in 1951 and then moved to the Saville Theatre on the West End and opened on September 25, 1952. The production was also televised in 1953.

== Productions ==
The original production opened in Coventry, England in 1951 and was directed by Charles Hickman with choreography by Pauline Grant. The production starred Jean Carson as Jerusha Abbott. The rest of the cast included Barbara Deeks, Pixie Murphy, Moiya Kelly, Linda Gray, Vincent Lawson, Bill O'Connor, Audrey Freeman, June Whitfield, Johnny Brandon, William Greene, Adelaide Hall, Jeanette Landis, Francis Pidgeon, and Thane Bettany. The production transferred to the Saville Theatre in the West End the following year and opened on September 25.

=== Television adaptation ===
The original production was filmed with the original cast and aired on BBC on March 16, 1953.

== Synopsis ==
Jerusha "Judy" Abbott, an orphan living in New England. One day, a visiting trustee becomes interested in Judy and decides to give her a chance and send her to a college. He only requests that she send him a letter once a month keeping him updated on her studies and life. As she does not know his identity, she decides to name him "Daddy long-legs." Over the course of her years in college, she begins to fall in love with her mysterious benefactor and he returns her feelings.

== Musical numbers ==
Act I

- "Overture" – Orchestra
- "Mardi Gras" – Chorus
- "I Never Dream When I'm Asleep " – Judy
- "It's Great to Be an Orphan" – Judy and Orphans
- "Goin' Back to School" – Ensemble
- "Dumb, Dumb, Dumb" – Sally and Girls
- "It's Better Rich" – Grace
- "Daddy Long-Legs" – Judy and Jervis
- "Love from Judy" – Judy, Jervis, and Chorus
- "A Touch of Voodoo" – Butterfly, Jimmy, and Men
- "Skipping Rope Hornpipe" – Dancers
- "Here We Are" – Sally and Chorus
- "Go and Get Your Old Banjo" – Judy and Chorus
- "Act 1 Finale" – Company

Act II

- "Entr'acte" – Orchestra
- "Here We Are (Reprise)" – Grace and Chorus
- "Kind to Animals" – Butterfly
- "Ain't Gonna Marry" – Sally, Jimmy, Butterfly, Wilberforce, and Chorus
- "My True Love" – Jervis
- "Ain't Gonna Marry (Reprise)" – Butterfly
- "What Do I see in You" – Jimmy and Julia
- "Love from Judy (Reprise)" – Jervis and Chorus
- "Finale" – Jervis, Judy, and Company
- "Ain't Gonna Marry (Reprise II)" – Full Company
- "Love from Judy (Reprise II)" – Full Company

== Casts and characters ==
Character	Original West End 1952
Jerusha "Judy" Abbott	Jeannie Carson
Gladiola Murphy	Pixie Murphy
Mamie	Moiya Kelly
Mrs. Grace Pritchard	Linda Gray
Cyrus Wykoff	Vincent Lawson
Jervis Pendleton	Bill O'Connor
Julia Pendleton	Audrey Freeman
Sally McBride	June Whitfield
Jimmy McBride	Johnny Brandon
Gordon McLintock	William Greene
Butterfly	Adelaide Hall
Mary Lou Wagner	Jeanette Landis
