= Long leg =

Long Leg, Long Legs, Longleg, Longlegs, long-legged, may refer to:

== People ==
- William Longleg, Lord of Douglas (1220–1274), Scottish noble
- Halfdan Long-Leg (9th century; Old Norse: Hálfdan háleggur), Viking warrior

== Arts, entertainment, media ==
- Longlegs (film), 2024 U.S. horror film
- Longleg (novel), 1990 novel by Glenda Adams

== Nature ==
- Long-legged bat, species of bat
- Long-legged bunting, extinct species of bunting
- Long-legged buzzard, bird of prey in Eurasia and North Africa
- Long-legged cricket frog, species of frog
- Long-legged fly, species of fly
- Long-legged Hyena, species of hyena
- Long-legged marsh glider, species of dragonfly
- Long-legged myotis, species of vesper bat
- Long-legged pipit, species of bird
- Long-legged sac spider, species of spider
- Long legged saw horned beetle, genus of rhinoceros beetle
- Long-legged thicketbird, small bird species
- Long-legged Vulture, species of vulture
- Long-legged wood frog, species of frog

== Music ==
- New Long Leg, 2021 album by Dry Cleaning
- Long Legged Girl (with the Short Dress On), single by Elvis Presley

== Other uses ==
- Long leg, a cricket fielding position
- Long Legs, Long Fingers, 1966 German film

== See also ==
- Daddy longlegs (disambiguation)
- Long (disambiguation)
- Leg (disambiguation)
