= Charles L. Webster =

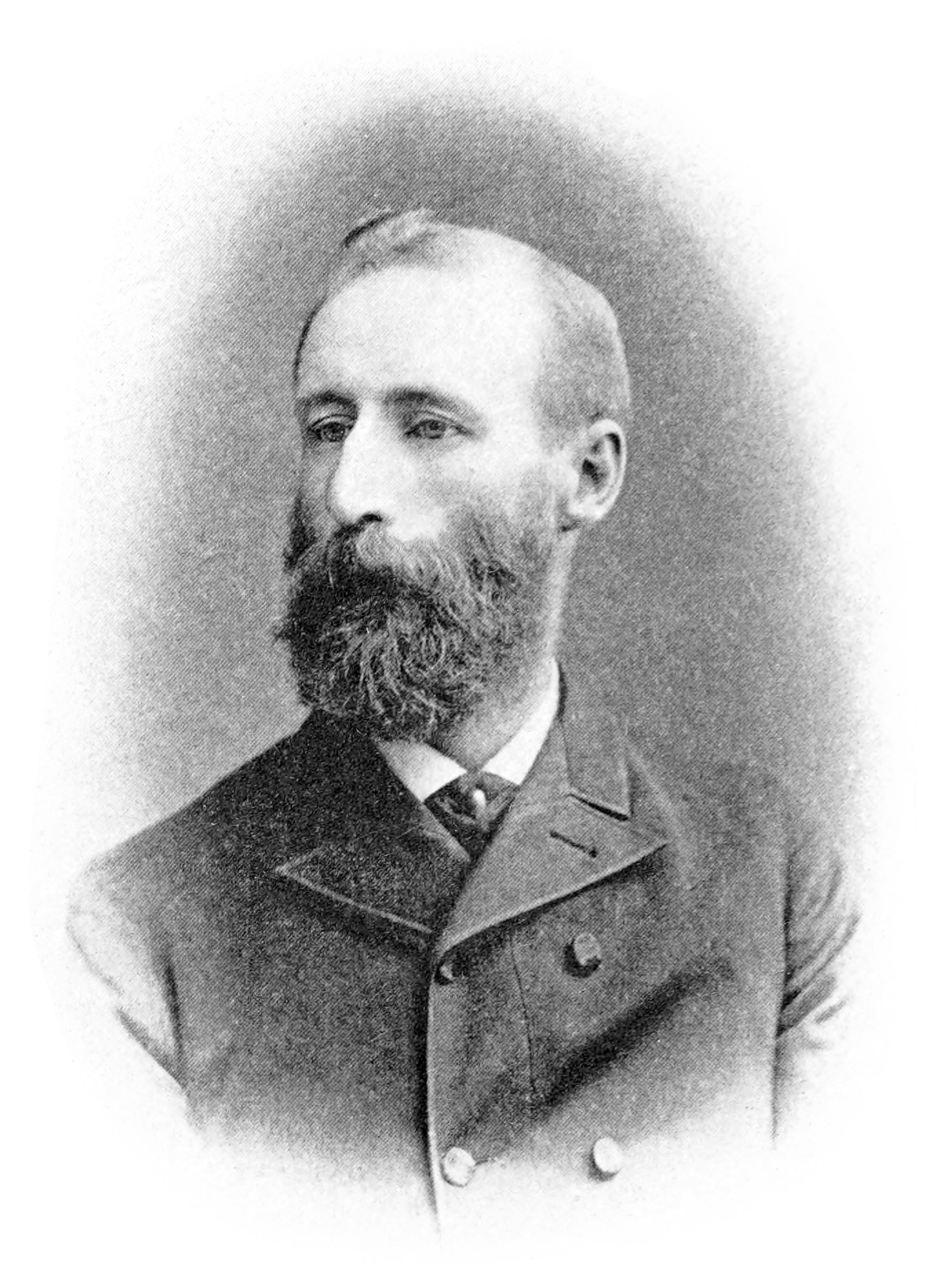
- Born: September 24, 1851; Charlotte, New York
- Died: April 28, 1891 (aged 39); Fredonia, NY
- Occupation: Publisher
- Spouse: Annie Moffett
- Children: Alice Jane Chandler Webster, Samuel Charles Webster

Charles Luther Webster (September 24, 1851 – April 28, 1891) was an American businessman and publisher. He served as Mark Twain's business manager and was eventually installed as the head of Twain's publishing company, Charles L. Webster and Co., named for Webster.

Webster was born in Charlotte, New York in 1851 and married Annie Moffett, Mark Twain's niece, in 1875. The following year, Annie gave birth to a daughter, Alice Jane Chandler Webster.

In 1881, Twain hired Webster to oversee the development of Twain's investments for the Kaolatype process for making engraved printing plates. When Twain decided to start his own publishing company in 1884, he hired Webster to head the company and named it after him, promoting him to full partner in March 1885. Twain came to feel Webster was incompetent and removed him from the company in 1888, while retaining Webster's name. In his autobiography, Twain described Webster as "one of the most assful persons I have ever met–perhaps the most assful." In a letter to Twain's brother, Orion Clemens, he wrote that he never hated anyone as much as he hated Webster. Webster's son, Samuel Charles Webster, published the book Mark Twain, Business Man in 1946 to rehabilitate his father's reputation.

Webster died in Fredonia, New York on April 28, 1891.
