= Moiya Kelly =

British actress (1934–2023)

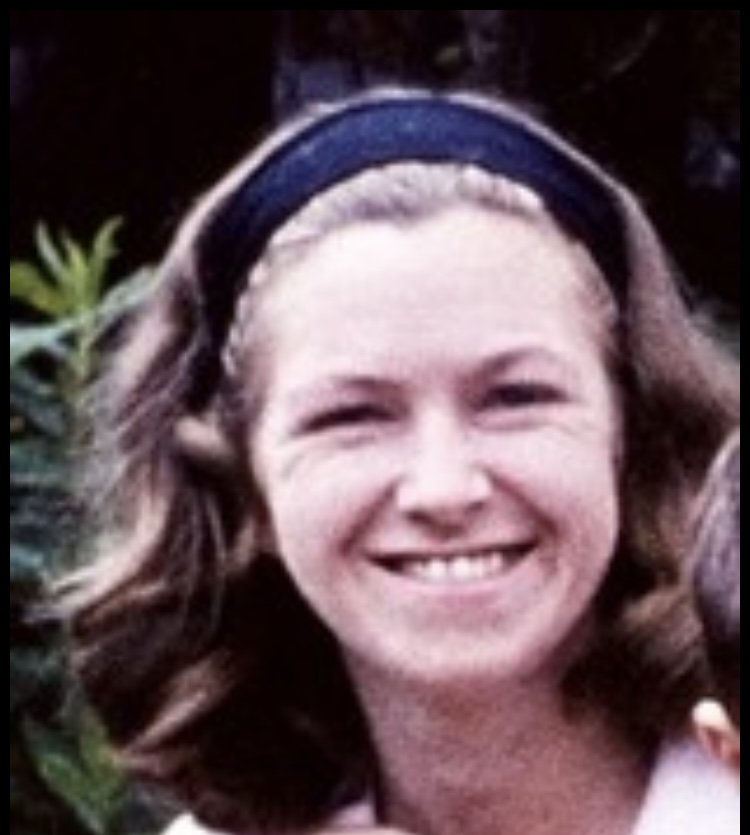
Moiya Kelly Bewsher

Moiya Ann Kelly (28 May 1934 – 3 January 2023) was a British actress during the 1950s who is probably best known for playing Martha Cratchit in the film Scrooge (1951) starring Alistair Sim.

== Early life and career ==
Moiya Kelly was born in Finsbury, London on 28 May 1934, a daughter of Williamina Stuart (née Duff) (1904–1979) and Robert Kelly (born 1904), a salesman. Just short of her third birthday in 1937 she danced a duet on stage at the Hippodrome Theatre in Norwich, appearing there again in 1940 and 1941. An accomplished dancer by the age of 13, Kelly was invited to audition for the Royal Ballet School. They, while recognising her talent, informed her that she would not grow tall enough for a professional career in ballet. She after attended the Aida Foster Theatre School where her contemporaries included Barbara Windsor and Jean Marsh.

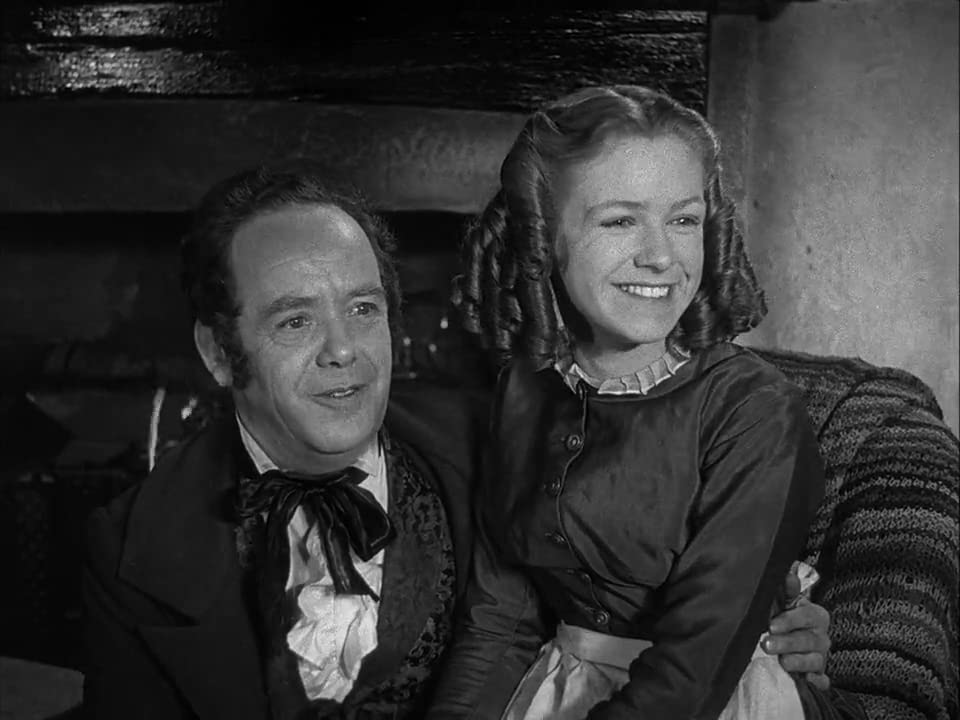
Mervyn Johns as Bob Cratchit and Moiya Kelly as Martha Cratchit in Scrooge (1951)

Aged 16 Kelly appeared at the Prince's Theatre on Shaftesbury Avenue in the pantomime Cinderella opposite Derek Roy as Buttons and Christine Norden as Prince Charming. She next appeared as Irene Collins in the play Cosh Boy (April 1951) at the Embassy Theatre in Swiss Cottage in London, playing the same role when the play was renamed Master Crook when it transferred to the Comedy Theatre in December 1951. Kelly was disappointed not to be offered the role of Irene Collins in the film Cosh Boy (1953), with the part going to Joan Collins.

During the run of the play Cosh Boy Kelly came to the notice of Brian Desmond Hurst, who cast her as Martha Cratchit in Scrooge (1951) opposite Alistair Sim in the title role. She played a schoolgirl in two episodes of a television adaptation of Anne of Green Gables (1952) before appearing as Mamie in the musical Love from Judy (1952) with June Whitfield at the Saville Theatre. A television adaptation of the original production was filmed with the original cast and aired on the BBC on March 16, 1953. Kelly was an extra in the films The Belles of St. Trinian's (1954) and The Love Lottery (1954). She was involved in the BBC outside broadcast Youth Wants To Know and took part in a television programme showcasing promising young talent with Julian Bream, Leslie Crowther, and Shani Wallis.

Her parents advising her to find a more steady employment than acting, Kelly became a primary school teacher, at first in Borehamwood, and later in Camberley in Surrey.

== Personal life and death ==
Kelly married John G. Bewsher (born 1935) in 1959. In her later years, she lived in Bagshot, Surrey. She died on 4 January 2023, at the age of 88.
