= Dear Enemy (novel) =

1915 novel by Jean Webster

- Author: Jean Webster
- Genre: Young Adult
- Publication date: 1915
- Preceded by: Daddy-Long-Legs

Dear Enemy is the 1915 sequel to Jean Webster's 1912 novel Daddy-Long-Legs. It was among the top 10 best sellers in the U.S. in 1916. The story is presented in a series of letters written by Sallie McBride, Judy Abbott's classmate and best friend in Daddy-Long-Legs. Among the recipients of the letters are Judy; Jervis Pendleton, Judy's husband and the president of the orphanage where Sallie is filling in until a new superintendent can be installed; Gordon Hallock, a wealthy Congressman and Sallie's later fiancé; and the orphanage's doctor, embittered Scotsman Robin 'Sandy' MacRae (to whom Sallie addresses her letters: "Dear Enemy"). Webster employs the epistolary structure to good effect; Sallie's choices of what to recount to each of her correspondents reveal a lot about her relationships with them.

== Plot introduction ==
As Daddy-Long-Legs traced Judy Abbott's growth from a young girl into an adult, Dear Enemy shows how Sallie McBride grows from a frivolous socialite to a mature woman and an able executive. It also follows the development of Sallie's relationships with Gordon Hallock, a wealthy politician, and Dr. Robin MacRae, the orphanage's physician. Both relationships are affected by Sallie's initial reluctance to commit herself to her job, and by her gradual realization of how happy the work makes her and how incomplete she'd feel without it. The daily calamities and triumphs of an orphanage superintendent are wittily described, often accompanied by the author's own stick-figure illustrations.

== Major themes ==
The novel is set in rural Dutchess County, New York, early in the 20th century. It examines a number of social issues: how to care for orphans (and for children in general), divorce, and the value of women's work. (The latter is a natural extension of the theme of women's education in Daddy-Long-Legs.) While volunteer work by women is widely accepted, women working in responsible positions for pay is still viewed with some hostility by some characters, such as Gordon Hallock, Sallie's friend and later fiancé, and the Honorable Cyrus Wykoff, a trustee of the John Grier Home. The Hon. Cy (as Sallie calls him) objects to the JGH paying a salary to Betsy, Sallie's assistant: "She's a woman, and her family ought to support her."

Though the Hon. Cy makes it clear that he thinks Sallie is frivolous and unsuited to superintend an orphanage, Sallie is so devoted to the orphans' well-being that she turns even her social life—explicitly criticized by the Hon. Cy—into an opportunity to further her cause, recruiting volunteers, benefactors, and foster parents at dinner parties and afternoon teas.

Webster also deals with women's life choices in a more subtle fashion. She contrasts the miserable marriage of Sallie's friend Helen with Sallie's fruitful life as she devotes herself to the demanding and strenuous task of running an orphanage. Sallie considers Judy Abbott, who married soon after completing college, an anomaly for her remarkably successful marriage with Jervis. Divorced from her unsuitable husband, Helen ultimately finds happiness in joining Sallie's cause at the orphanage, applying herself to work for the public good.

Socialism applied to charitable causes is an underlying theme; the John Grier Home couldn't survive without the beneficence of the trustees and community. The novel also deals with the evolving ideas about how best to care for orphans at the turn of the century, with the institution-style establishments falling out of favor, in light of the modern 'cottage' approach. Care for the children's emotional and spiritual needs is considered paramount, as Sallie works with Dr. MacRae, Judy, and Jervis to enact her reforms. The reasons these are necessary at the John Grier Home is clearly outlined in the first novel, in Judy's miserable recollections of her old home.

Concerns with the hereditary origins of 'feeble-mindedness' and alcoholism are expressed by Dr. MacRae and by Sallie. The doctor's anxieties prove to have an underlying basis in his experience, which is revealed towards the end of the novel. Although the themes are intense, the author generally deals with them in an amusing and light-hearted fashion.

This book heavily promotes the eugenics movement. The main character refuses to allow disabled people in her orphanage stating that they don’t have the resources to deal with ‘defectives’ as she calls disabled people . Also the main character and Dr. MacRae seem to bond over their shared support of the eugenics movement.

== Other media ==
Dear Enemy was made into a seven-part ITV serial in 1981. with Vanessa Knox-Mower as Sallie McBride and Patrick Malahide as Dr. MacRae.

Unlike Daddy-Long-Legs which received two anime adaptations in the 70s (Manga Sekai Mukashi Banashi) and 90s (My Daddy Long Legs) there has not been an animated adaptations in cartoons of this sequel.
