= Merry Tales =

Book by Mark Twain

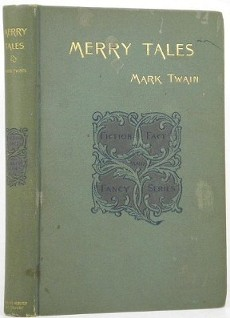
- First edition
- Author: Mark Twain
- Language: English
- Genre: Sketches
- Publisher: Charles L. Webster
- Publication date: 1892
- Publication place: United States
- Media type: Print
- Pages: 209

Merry Tales is a short volume with sketches by Mark Twain, published by Charles L. Webster and Company in March 1892.

== Contents ==
- "The Private History of a Campaign That Failed"
- "The Invalid's Story"
- "Luck"
- "The Captain's Story"
- "A Curious Experience"
- "Mrs. Mc Williams and the Lightning"
- "Meisterschaft"

The contents of Merry Tales, except "The Captain's Story", were reprinted as a section titled "Merry Tales" in The American Claimant and Other Stories and Sketches.
