= Charles L. Webster and Company =

Publishing house

- Status: Defunct
- Founded: 1884
- Founder: Samuel Clemens (Mark Twain)
- Defunct: April 18, 1894
- Country of origin: United States
- Headquarters location: New York City, New York
- Publication types: Books
- Nonfiction topics: Memoirs, military history, biography, politics
- Fiction genres: Literary fiction, satire
- Owner: Samuel Clemens (Mark Twain)

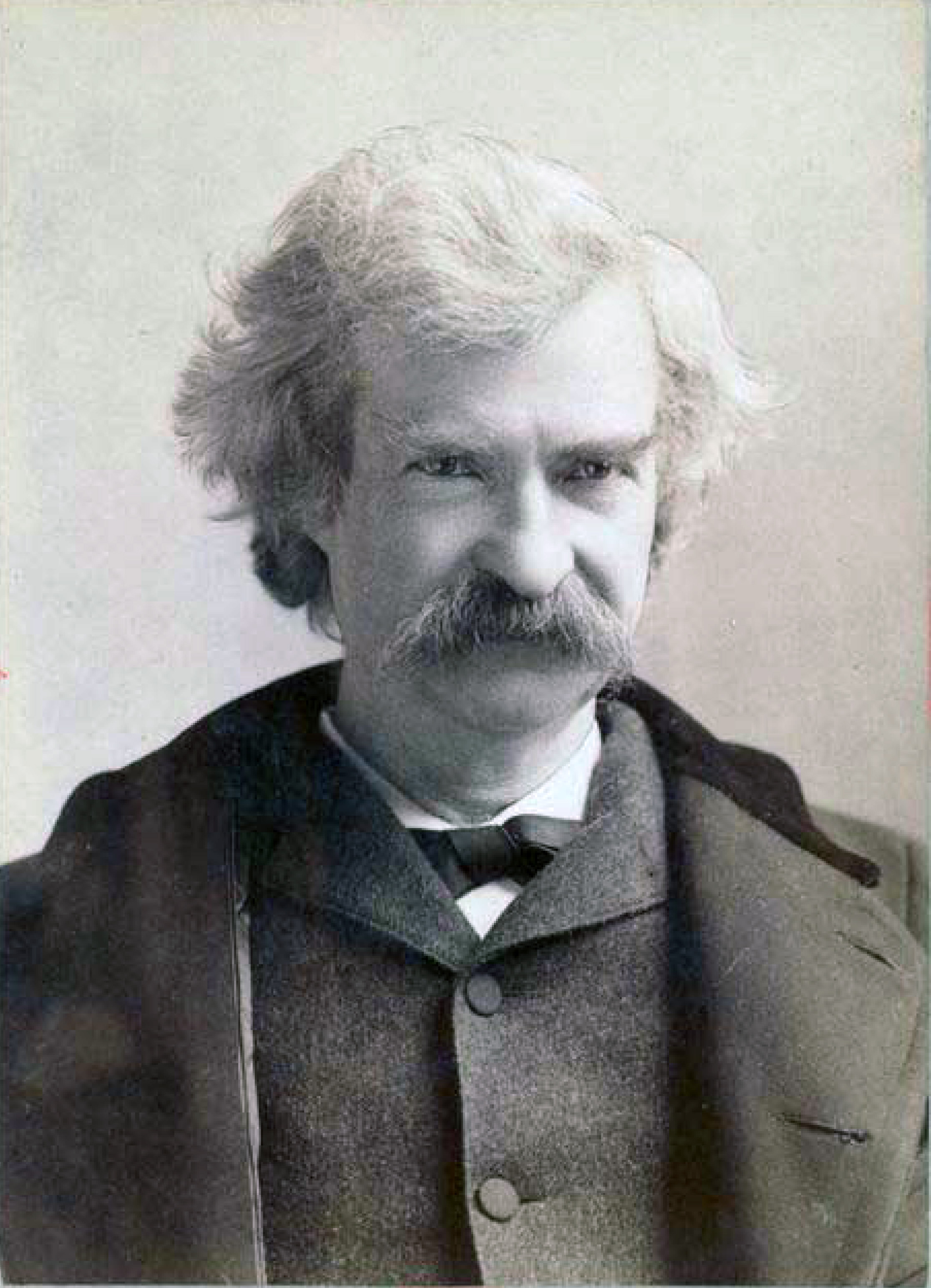
Samuel Clemens founded Charles L. Webster and Company in 1884. The firm closed in 1894 after Clemens declared bankruptcy. Photo: Sarony 1895

Charles L. Webster and Company was an American subscription publishing firm founded in New York in 1884 by author and journalist Samuel Clemens, popularly known as Mark Twain. The firm was closed after declaring bankruptcy in 1894.

== History ==
Founded in 1884, the firm was named after Clemens' niece’s husband Charles L. Webster whom Clemens appointed the firm's business director. The formation of the company came out of Clemens' dissatisfaction with his previous publishers including Charles H. Webb, Elisha Bliss, and James R. Osgood. Clemens wanted to earn a dual income as both author and publisher of books. The first two American publications of the firm, Adventures of Huckleberry Finn (1885) and the Personal Memoirs of Ulysses S. Grant (1885) were highly successful. The Ulysses S. Grant memoir publication in particular financially helped Grant and his family at a time when Grant was sick, having been diagnosed with throat cancer. Grant was a former President of the United States and top commanding general during the Civil War and Reconstruction. After Grant's death, Clemens gave Grant's widowed wife, Julia, a substantial royalty check of $450,000, the equivalent of $11 million today. According to Webster, prior to his death, Grant dictated the last part of the second volume to a stenographer working for the firm, due to writing fatigue, starting with Robert E. Lee's surrender at Appomattox. Webster, who accompanied the stenographer, respected Grant's reputation and honored his request to keep secret from reporters that Grant dictated part of the book.

Other books later published by the firm were not as successful and soon Clemens had to reinvest profits back into the firm to make up for losses. In 1888, as the company financially suffered, Clemens fired Webster, who was at odds with him on how to run the firm successfully. Webster, himself, had been overworked traveling throughout the United States visiting the firm's principal agents. As the firm grew deeper in debt, Clemens was forced to close the business, having formally declared bankruptcy on April 18, 1894. The firms most productive years, although not financially, were from 1891 to 1893. Notable authors published, including Clemens, were Leo Tolstoy, Henry George, and Walt Whitman.

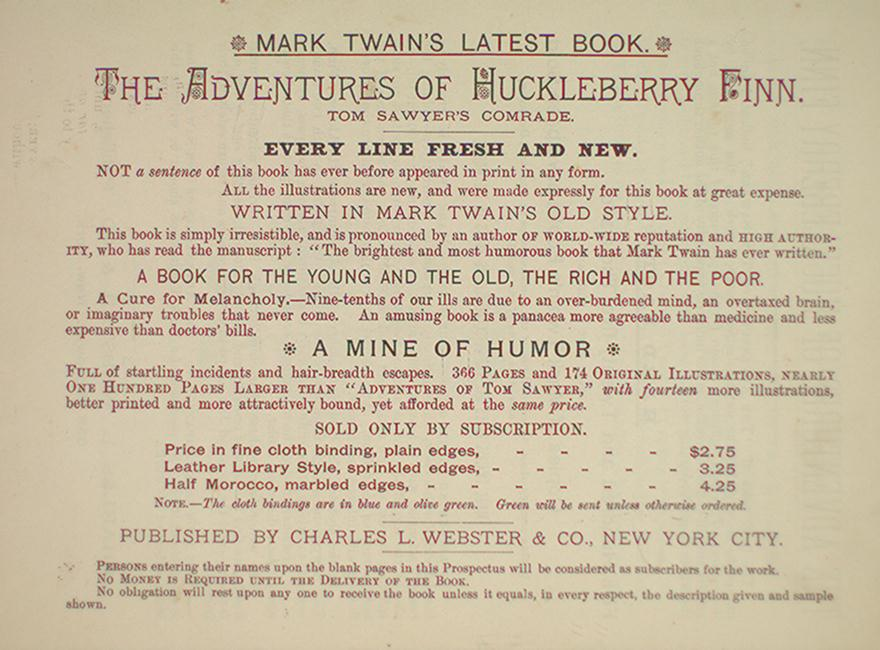
Charles L. Webster and Company ad for Samuel Clemen's popular book Adventures of Huckleberry Finn

== Selected list of published books ==
=== 1884 ===
- Adventures of Huckleberry Finn United Kingdom by Samuel Clemens

=== 1885 ===
- Adventures of Huckleberry Finn United States by Samuel Clemens
- Personal Memoirs of Ulysses S. Grant Volumes 1 & 2 by Ulysses S. Grant

=== 1886 ===
- McClellan's Own Story: The War for the Union, the Soldiers Who Fought It, the Civilians Who Directed It, and His Relations to It and to Them by George B. McClellan

=== 1887 ===
- Tenting on the Plains; or, General Custer in Kansas and Texas by Elizabeth Custer
- The Life of Pope Leo the XIII by Father Bernard O'Reilly
- Reminiscences of Winfield Scott Hancock by Almira Russell Hancock

=== 1888 ===
- Personal Memoirs of P.H. Sheridan, General, United States Army Volumes 1 & 2 by Philip Sheridan

=== 1889 ===
- The Life and Letters of Roscoe Conkling, Orator, Statesman, Advocate by Alfred R. Conkling
- A Connecticut Yankee in King Arthur's Court by Samuel Clemens

=== 1890 ===
- Memoirs of Gen. W. T. Sherman by William T. Sherman

=== 1891 ===
- Adventures of a Fair Rebel by Matt Crim
- Tinkletop's Crime by George Robert Sims
- Ivan the Fool; or, The Old Devil and the Three Small Devils, also A Lost Opportunity, and Polikshka by Leo Tolstoy

=== 1892 ===
- The Master of Silence: A Romance by Irving Bacheller
- Moonblight and Six Feet of Romance by Daniel C. Beard
- The German Emperor and His Eastern Neighbors by Poultney Bigelow
- Writings of Christopher Columbus, Descriptive of the Discovery of the New World by Christopher Columbus
- Life is Worth Living, and Other Stories by Leo Tolstoy
- The American Claimant by Samuel Clemens
- Merry Tales by Samuel Clemens
- Selected Poems by Walt Whitman
- Autobiographia, or, the Story of a Life by Walt Whitman

=== 1893 ===
- A Catastrophe in Bohemia and Other Stories by Henry S. Brooks
- The Art of Sketching by Gustave B. Fraipont
- Social Problems by Henry George
- Stories from the Rabbis by Abram Samuel Isaacs
- The £1,000,000 Bank-note and Other New Stories by Samuel Clemens

=== 1894 ===
- Tom Sawyer Abroad by Samuel Clemens
- Alfred Lord Tennyson by Arthur Waugh

== Sources ==
- "Charles L. Webster and Company". Cornell University Library. Cornell University. 2010. Archived from the original on June 11, 2010.
- "The Publisher of Grant's Book He Tells How the General Was Induced to Write - Some New Books - Mark Twain's Cyclopedia of Wit and Humor". Twainquotes. 1997.
