= My Daddy Long Legs =

1990 Japanese animated television series

- A scene from the series (L-R): Julia Pendleton, Judy Abbott and Sally McBride
- 私のあしながおじさん
- Genre: Drama; Comedy; Coming-of-age; Slice of life; Romance
- Based on: Daddy-Long-Legs by Jean Webster
- Written by: Hiroshi Ōtsuka; Nobuyuki Fujimoto
- Directed by: Kazuyoshi Yokota
- Music by: Kei Wakakusa
- Country of origin: Japan
- Original language: Japanese
- No. of episodes: 40

Production
- Executive producer: Koichi Motohashi
- Producers: Yoshihisa Tachikawa (Fuji TV); Takaji Matsudo
- Production companies: Fuji Television; Nippon Animation

Original release
- Network: FNS (Fuji TV)
- Release: 14 January – 23 December 1990

My Daddy Long Legs (私のあしながおじさん, Watashi No Ashinaga Ojisan) is a Japanese animated television series based on the novel Daddy-Long-Legs by Jean Webster.

This anime aired in 1990 as part of the World Masterpiece Theater series, produced by Nippon Animation and was awarded the Excellent Movie Award for Television by the Japanese Agency of Cultural Affairs for Children in 1990. It aired from 14 January to 23 December, with 40 episodes produced.

== Premise ==
Judy Abbott is an orphan who has been given the opportunity to study at the prestigious Lincoln Memorial High School by a mysterious benefactor whom she only knows as "John Smith". She has only seen his shadow once, and because of his long legs, she calls him "Daddy Long Legs". The only payment she is to give her benefactor is that she write him letters every month, with no expectation of them being responded to.

The anime covers three years of Judy's life, starting with her leaving the John Grier Orphanage, and ending with her finishing high school.

== Characters ==
Judy Abbott (ジュディ・アボット, Judi Abotto)
A cheerful and intelligent girl whose parents died when she was still a baby. She was found at Bayson Avenue at New York City and was taken into the John Grier Orphanage, where she develops her talent for writing. It is one of her essays that catches the attention of a trustee known as "John Smith", enabling her to earn a scholarship from him to attend the Lincoln Memorial High School. She does not know who John Smith is, and calls him "Daddy Long Legs". Even so, she considers him the only family she has, and becomes attached to him. She talks very much and loves story telling. Judy's roommates at Lincoln Memorial are Sallie McBride and Julia Pendleton. Judy has a considerable inferiority complex that she is orphan, she suffers not to be able to confide it to anyone. In the anime, Judy's appearance seems to resemble like Pippi Longstocking, by having red-hair and braids sticking out.
Jervis Pendleton (ジャーヴィス・ペンデルトン, Jāvisu Penderuton)
Julia Pendleton's uncle, whom Judy meets over her time at the Lincoln Memorial school. He is called an eccentric misanthropist and is famous in business world, but the reason is because he hates polite society. He later develops feelings for Judy. He, later in the series, admits to Judy that he was her 'Daddy Long Legs' all along. At the end of the series, he and Judy are married.
Sallie McBride (サリー・マクブライド, Sarī Makuburaido)
A shy but sweet girl who is one of Judy's roommates at the Lincoln Memorial High School. They become very close, and Sallie grows fond of Judy. She is often made fun of by Julia because of her short and chubby stature. She is strong-willed in spite of her appearance.
Julia Rutledge Pendleton (ジュリア・ルートレッジ・ペンデルトン, Juria Rūtorejji Penderuton)
A wealthy and snobbish, but well-mannered student, she is tall and elegant and one of Judy's roommates at the Lincoln Memorial High School. She and Judy initially do not get along, with Julia constantly trying to uncover Judy's secret background, but she eventually becomes Judy's best friend along with Sallie.
Joanna Sloane (ジョアンナ・スローン, Joanna Surōn)
The manager of the dormitory where Judy lives in Fergussen Hall, who tends to put up a mask of cruelty and anger to hide what she truly feels. She hates that she is called "Mrs." because she is still a bachelor, but she seems to want to marry.
Walter Griggs (ウォルター・グリグス, Worutā Gurigusu)
Secretary of Judy's guardian, "Daddy Long-Legs".
Jimmy McBride (ジミー・マクブライド, Jimī Makuburaido)
Sallie's older brother, he is the highly popular ace of the Princeton University football team. He is very kind and an obliging person. He grows fond of Judy. Julia falls in love with him in her second year.
Bob (ボブ, Bobu)
Captain of Princeton University football team, a gentleman, albeit unreliable at times.
Leonora Fenton (レオノラ・フェントン, Reonora Fenton)
Judy's new roommate, she is a year older than Judy. She returned to Judy's class after having taken a leave of absence from school because of chest's disease for one year. She is good at poetry and sports, she was a famous player of basketball before. Judy disliked her because she criticized a novel which Judy wrote, but she becomes a good senior of Judy immediately.
Catherine Lippett (キャサリン・リペット, Kyasarin Ripetto)
A woman who works in John Greer Orphanage's Manger, the children in orphanage hated her because she was too strict to the discipline, but she loves children in reality. She retires while Judy is attending Lincoln Memorial High School.
Mary Lambart (メアリー・ランバート, Mearī Ranbāto)
A woman who is part of St. George Orphanage's staff, she is a strong woman with humor and acting power, and is adored by children. She has a realistic idea for the education of the orphan. She is a prototype of Maria Florence in the next series Trapp Family Story.

=== Original voice cast ===
- Mitsuko Horie as Judy Abbott
- Chie Satou as Sallie McBride
- Yuri Amano as Julia Pendleton
- Hideyuki Tanaka as Jervis Pendleton
- Bin Shimada as Jimmy McBride
- Yoshino Ohtori as Ms. Throne
- Tatsuko Ishimori as Harmond
- Hiromi Tsuru as Leonora Fenton (episode 20–22 & 40)
- Hiroshi Masuoka as Mr. Griggs
- Kenichi Ogata as George Sempleton
- Hisako Kyouda as Eliza Sempleton
- Michitaka Kobayashi as Arthur
- Yuko Kobayashi as Carrie
- Toshiko Fujita as Mrs. Lippett and Margot Foster
- Masako Katsuki as Mary Lambart
- Yoku Shioya as Bob
- Yuriko Fuchizaki as Emily
- Eiko Yamada as Sadie

== Staff ==
- Director: Kazuyoshi Yokota
- Scenario: Hiroshi Ōtsuka, Nobuyuki Fujimoto
- Character design: Shūichi Seki
- Music: Kei Wakakusa
- Sound director: Tadayoshi Fujino
- Animation director: Atsushi Irie, Akira Kikuchi
- Art director: Shigero Morimoto
- Producer: Takaji Matsudo (Nippon Animation), Yoshihisa Tachikawa (Fuji Television)
- Planning: Shōji Satō (Nippon Animation), Masunosuke Ōhashi (Dentsu Osaka branch), Kenji Shimizu (Fuji Television)
- Production management: Mitsuru Takakuwa, Junzō Nakajima (Nippon Animation)
- Production desk: Akio Yogo

== Episode list ==
No.	Title	Original release date
1	"The Monday that Changed my Destiny"; Transliteration: "Unmei o Kaeta Getsuyōbi" (Japanese: 運命を変えた月曜日)	14 January 1990
After her parents died, Judy is forced to stay in an orphanage managed by Ms. Lippett. She faced a lot of struggles as an orphan while also tending to younger orphans' needs. An opportunity came at most one of the five orphans to have a high-school scholarship and Judy was chosen to be the one.
2	"Preparing for a Journey by Myself"; Transliteration: "Hitori Bocchi no Tabidachi" (Japanese: ひとりぼっちの旅立ち)	21 January 1990
Judy leaves to study at Lincoln Memorial School for Girls. She bought presents for all the other orphans using her own clothing allowance, but one orphan did not like this gesture at all. She is informed that a John Smith is sponsoring her studies and she is required to write a letter to him regularly about her condition in the school.
3	"The Long-Awaited Lincoln Memorial Girls School"; Transliteration: "Akogare no Rinkān Kinen Joshi Gakuen" (Japanese: 憧れのリンカーン記念女子学園)	28 January 1990
4	"A Hurly-Burly Opening Ceremony"; Transliteration: "Ten'yawan'ya no Nyūgakushiki" (Japanese: てんやわんやの入学式)	4 February 1990
5	"How to Decorate a Room Beautifully"; Transliteration: "Oheya no Sutekina Kazari-kata" (Japanese: お部屋の素敵な飾り方)	11 February 1990
6	"Do You Hate Liars?"; Transliteration: "Usotsuki wa Kirai desu ka?" (Japanese: 嘘つきは嫌いですか？)	25 February 1990
7	"A Good Way To Use Gold Coins"; Transliteration: "Kinka no Jōzuna Tsukaimichi" (Japanese: 金貨の上手な使いみち)	4 March 1990
8	"The letter thrown away into the rubbish bin" Transliteration: "Kuzu Kazo ni Sute rareta Tegami" (Japanese: 屑籠に捨てられた手紙)	11 March 1990
9	"Julia's Uncle is an Eccentric Person?"; Transliteration: "Juria no Mijikima wa Kawarimono?" (Japanese: ジュリアの叔父様は変り者？)	18 March 1990
Julia asked Judy to meet her uncle Jervis and show him around the campus. Judy was initially reluctant but found out that he's an affable person. She showed him her favorite place in the campus which turns out to be the top of the Ferguson dormitory which alarmed Miss Sloan, who in turn called for police. Upon coming back to the room, they were confronted by Miss Sloan but was eventually won over by Jervis' charm.
10	"I'm Sorry I Betrayed You"; Transliteration: "Uragitte Gomen'nasai" (Japanese: 裏切ってごめんなさい)	25 March 1990
11	"I can't believe his name was there" Transliteration: "Omoigakenai Hito no Na" (Japanese: おもいがけない人の名)	15 April 1990
12	"A strange coincidence" Transliteration: "Kimyōna Gūzen" (Japanese: 奇妙な偶然)	22 April 1990
13	"Sallie's courageous challenge!" Transliteration: "Sarī no Yūki aru Chōsen" (Japanese: サリーの勇気ある挑戦)	6 May 1990
14	"Was the first short story plagiarized?" Transliteration: "Hajimete no Shōsetsu ga Tōkiku?" (Japanese: 初めての小説が盗作？)	20 May 1990
Judy wrote a short story for a writing competition coinciding with the 50th Anniversary of Lincoln High School. At Sally's suggestion, Judy showed it to Mr. Melnore. To her dismay, Mr. Melnore told her that by the style of her story, one could tell her favorite authors, which is equivalent to plagiarising their work. Afterwards, Judy wrote a short story: a young orphan named Jerusha (in the original novel, this was Judy's real name; she changed it to 'Judy' when she went to college) was caught taking a biscuits from the biscuit tray by the matron of the orphanage. As a punishment, she was sent to her room with no food. One night, she tried to escape but the matron caught her and for that, she was tied to a tree. Then, a young boy came and freed her. They ran to the forest with the matron and some hired help out looking for them. They nearly got caught and the two decided to part ways to elude the search party. Years later, Jerusha was working in a cornfield and on her way back to the farm, a car stopped beside her and out came a man who called her name. She did not initially recognize the stranger until it dawned to her that this was the owner of the farm she's working in and also the boy who rescued her from the orphanage. Upon reading the story, Sally and Julia (although, she tried to hide it) were deeply touched and wept. When the competition ended, the poster showed that there were no clear winners but Judy won a commemoration fountain pen as a prize which she gladly accepted.
15	"A hot dog and a wallflower" Transliteration: "Hotto Doggu to Kage no Hana" (Japanese: ホットドッグと壁の花)	27 May 1990
The dance ball at the Lincoln Memorial High School was coming and many of the girls are inviting their male companions to dance with them. Julia said that the girl who doesn't have a partner is called a wallflower and although Judy is actually worried of becoming one, she decided that if she'll become one, she might as well be the most beautiful wallflower. When she accompanied Julia on a shopping trip, they went to a small diner called "Presence of Mind" at Judy's suggestion, for some a meal. There, they were greeted by a very affable, tall, and dark haired waiter. At his suggestion, Judy ordered some hotdogs and with reluctance, so did Julia. His cheerful and irreproachable personality endeared him to Judy but not so with Julia, who took into openly disliking him. During the ball, Julia, Judy, and Sally were the only ones standing in the corner. Sallie went to look for her dance partner who seemed to be wandering somewhere while Julia decided to have a drink and as she was getting a drink, she bumped into a man and to her surprise, it was the affable waiter, who was busy stuffing himself with hotdogs. The waiter tried to apologise to Julia but she snubbed him. He was however, glad to see Judy and asked her for a dance. It turned out that the waiter was Jimmie McBride, Sally's brother and to Julia's annoyance and surprise, is also the star quarterback of Princeton University football team.
16	"A Present from a Quarterback"; Transliteration: "Kuōtābakku kara no Okurimono" (Japanese: クォーターバックからの贈り物)	3 June 1990
17	"Unconfessable Heart"; Transliteration: "Uchiake Rarenai Kokoro" (Japanese: 打ちあけられない心)	10 June 1990
18	"A Thanksgiving Dinner Invitation"; Transliteration: "Kansha-sai e no Shōtaijō" (Japanese: 感謝祭への招待状)	17 June 1990
19	"My Friends, Let's Sing Together"; Transliteration: "Tomo yo, Tomo ni Utawan" (Japanese: 友よ、ともに歌わん)	24 June 1990
20	"An Older Classmate"; Transliteration: "Toshi no Dōkyū-sei" (Japanese: 年上の同級生)	1 July 1990
21	"Beauty and Sadness"; Transliteration: "Utsukushi-sa to Kanashimi to" (Japanese: 美しさとかなしみと)	8 July 1990
22	"Snow falling on the Window"; Transliteration: "Mado ni Furu Yuki" (Japanese: 窓に降る雪)	29 July 1990
23	"Our Different Christmases"; Transliteration: "Sorezore no Kurisumasu" (Japanese: それぞれのクリスマス)	5 August 1990
24	"As You Like It"; Transliteration: "Okinimesumama" (Japanese: お気に召すまま)	12 August 1990
25	"New York, My Birthplace"; Transliteration: "Furusato・Nyū Yōku" (Japanese: ふるさと・ニューヨーク)	19 August 1990
26	"A Bridge to Tomorrow"; Transliteration: "Asu ni Kakeru Hashi" (Japanese: 明日に架ける橋)	26 August 1990
27	"Being a Tutor is no Easy Task"; Transliteration: "Kateikyōshi wa Rakujanai" (Japanese: 家庭教師は楽じゃない)	2 September 1990
28	"A Ruthless Order"; Transliteration: "Mujihina Meirei" (Japanese: 無慈悲な命令)	9 September 1990
29	"Full of Memories"; Transliteration: "Omoide ga Ippai" (Japanese: 思い出がいっぱい)	16 September 1990
30	"Love on a Summer Day"; Transliteration: "Natsu no Hi no Koi" (Japanese: 夏の日の恋)	23 September 1990
Judy was back in Lock Willow farm. Although she wrote to Daddy Long Legs that she was sad not to go to the Adirondacks with Sally, Jimmy, and Julia, she decided to make the best of her time at the farm. Later, Mr and Mrs. Sempleton told her that Master Jervis is paying a visit and everyone in the farm went busy preparing the place for him. Upon his arrival, they were all happy. Judy also received a letter from a local paper stating that they are publishing one of her stories and accompanying the letter is a cheque as payment. Mrs. Sempleton announced that they will be attending the church the following day but Master Jervis alluded her plans and took Judy out for fishing instead. The two went out fishing and camping but got caught out in the thunderstorm. In their hasty effort to get back to the farm, Judy slipped and fell into the ravine. Eventually, Jervis found her and held her in his arms. The day of his departure, he thanked everyone for his time in the farm and surprised Judy by planting a kiss on her cheek.
31	"Girls in Full Bloom"; Transliteration: "Hanazakari no Musume-tachi" (Japanese: 花ざかりの娘たち)	30 September 1990
32	"A Twilight Meeting at the Station"; Transliteration: "Tasogare no Eki Nite" (Japanese: 黄昏の駅にて)	21 October 1990
33	"Feelings That Just Miss Each Other"; Transliteration: "Surechigau Omoi" (Japanese: すれちがう想い)	4 November 1990
34	"The Throbbing of My Heart"; Transliteration: "Kono Mune no Kimeki o" (Japanese: この胸のときめきを)	11 November 1990
35	"Loneliness in Youth"; Transliteration: "Kodokuna Seishun" (Japanese: 孤独な青春)	18 November 1990
Sally was excited when Bob asked to take her out for a drive. Judy was also excited because tomorrow is Jervis' birthday and thought of giving him a present. They both asked Julia to go out shopping with them but Julia refused saying that she wanted to study. At the library, Julia couldn't concentrate on her studies and took out instead a book about American football. Upon arriving at Ferguson dormitory, Julia received a phone call from her mother. Mrs. Pendleton told her that she has arranged a dinner party for Julia and introduce her to the son of a New York real estate agent. Julia adamantly refused and said that she's in love with Jimmy McBride but her mother wouldn't hear of it. In anger, Julia slammed the phone down and went to her room. When Sally and Judy arrived later, they showed her the hat that Sallie bought for her intended date with Bob and Judy showed a handkerchief with initials "JP" embroidered on it as a present for Jervis. Julia initially wanted to tell them something but hesitated and announced to the girls that she's taking a walk for a while which puzzled Sally and Judy. Back in Princeton, Bob interrupted the football team's practice by telling Jimmy that he had a phone call. When Jimmy picked out the phone, it was from Julia. While Sally and Judy were asleep, Julia packed her favourite clothes and suitcase and slipped out of the dormitory. The following day, Mrs. Pendleton arrived with the intention of taking Julia out and bring her back to New York with her but Ms. Throne told her that she would have to follow the procedures and fill out the forms before taking Julia out of the dorm. The commotion this caused woke Judy up from her sleep. She roused Sallie from slumber and they both found that Julia's bed was empty. Mrs. Pendleton managed to force herself into the girls' room. When Ms. Throne, who overheard Julia's phone conversation with her mother, told Judy about the conversation, Judy came to conclusion that this might be the reason why Julia was acting strangely. While Mrs. Pendleton and Ms Sloan are in Sally and Julia's room, Judy took Sally to her room and told her that Julia might have run away. She asked Sally to distract Mrs. Pendleton and Ms. Throne so she can slip off and go look for Julia.
36	"In Order to Seize the Day"; Transliteration: "Ima o Ikiru Tame ni" (Japanese: 今を生きるために)	25 November 1990
37	"A Farewell on Christmas Eve"; Transliteration: "Seiya no Sayōnara" (Japanese: 聖夜のさようなら)	2 December 1990
38	"A Sad Proposal"; Transliteration: "Kanashī Puropōzu" (Japanese: 悲しいプロポーズ)	9 December 1990
39	"Graduating from the Past"; Transliteration: "Kako kara no Sotsugyō" (Japanese: 過去からの卒業)	16 December 1990
40	"Nice to Meet You, Daddy!"; Transliteration: "Hajimemashite Oji-sama" (Japanese: はじめましておじさま)	23 December 1990
On her graduation day, Mr. Griggs rushed to tell Judy that her father, John Smith, was terribly ill. She immediately got into the car and they drove towards the home of her sponsor. Along the way, she kept thinking about her time with Jervis. Suddenly caught in a traffic jam, Judy asked Mr. Griggs to draw a map and she ran towards the home of Mr. Smith despite the heavily pouring rain. After running into a parade and getting lost, she finally ended up at the home of John Smith where she has discovered that he was actually her lover, Jervis, who at that time was suffering from pneumonia and his health was deteriorating quickly. This is where he told Judy that he liked the initial entry she had for the scholarship, which he found interesting and quirky, so he decided to choose her for a scholarship. He has fallen in love with the Judy in the letters who seemed so carefree and he was deeply hurt when she had rejected him. After confessing his feelings and identity to Judy, he suddenly fainted and a doctor came in to tend to him. Sleeping by his bedside, Judy held his hand till morning. Jervis woke up and was cured of pneumonia. Later he married Judy at the small church in Lock Willow Farm. It is shown that Julia was engaged to Jimmy Mcbride, to be married once he completes his master's degree. Sallie and Bob remained good friends. Judy decided to go to college to achieve her dreams, while being a good wife to Jervis. In the end, she wrote a final letter to Daddy Long Legs signed Pendelton-Smith, Judy Abbott.

== Music ==
Original title	English title	Artist	Description
グローイング・アップ (Gurooing Appu)	Growing Up	Mitsuko Horie	Opening theme
キミの風 (Kimi no Kaze)	Your Wind	Mitsuko Horie, SHINES	Ending theme

== See also ==
- The Story of Pollyanna, Girl of Love: Mitsuko Horie acted an orphan who is the main character.
- Jeanie with the Light Brown Hair (TV series): Same as this work, starring Mitsuko Horie, planned by Masunosuke Ōhashi. Broadcast in 1992.
