= Daddy Long Legs (1931 film) =

1931 film

- Film poster, 1931
- Directed by: Alfred Santell
- Written by: Novel: Jean Webster; Screenplay: S.N. Behrman; Sonya Levien; Alfred Santell
- Produced by: Sol M. Wurtzel
- Starring: Janet Gaynor; Warner Baxter; Una Merkel; John Arledge
- Cinematography: Lucien N. Andriot
- Edited by: Ralph Dietrich
- Music by: Hugo Friedhofer
- Production company: Fox Film Corporation
- Release date: June 5, 1931
- Running time: 80 minutes
- Country: United States
- Language: English
- Box office: $987,000 (U.S. and Canada rentals)

Daddy Long Legs is a 1931 American pre-Code film directed by Alfred Santell and starring Janet Gaynor and Warner Baxter. The story involves an orphan who is taken under the wing of a wealthy benefactor.

The original story, written in 1912 by Jean Webster, compared the childhood of the wealthy to that of orphanage children. Although suffering under a tough matron, Judy Abbott (Janet Gaynor) manages to cope and help the other orphans through intelligence and hard work, and the wealthy Jervis Pendleton (Warner Baxter), who is the benefactor, can't help admiring his young charge. Yet, she doesn't know it's he who is sponsoring her schooling, even when they meet, through Jervis' niece, who is Judy's roommate, and the girl, who was once alone, has to choose between their growing affection and a younger suitor.

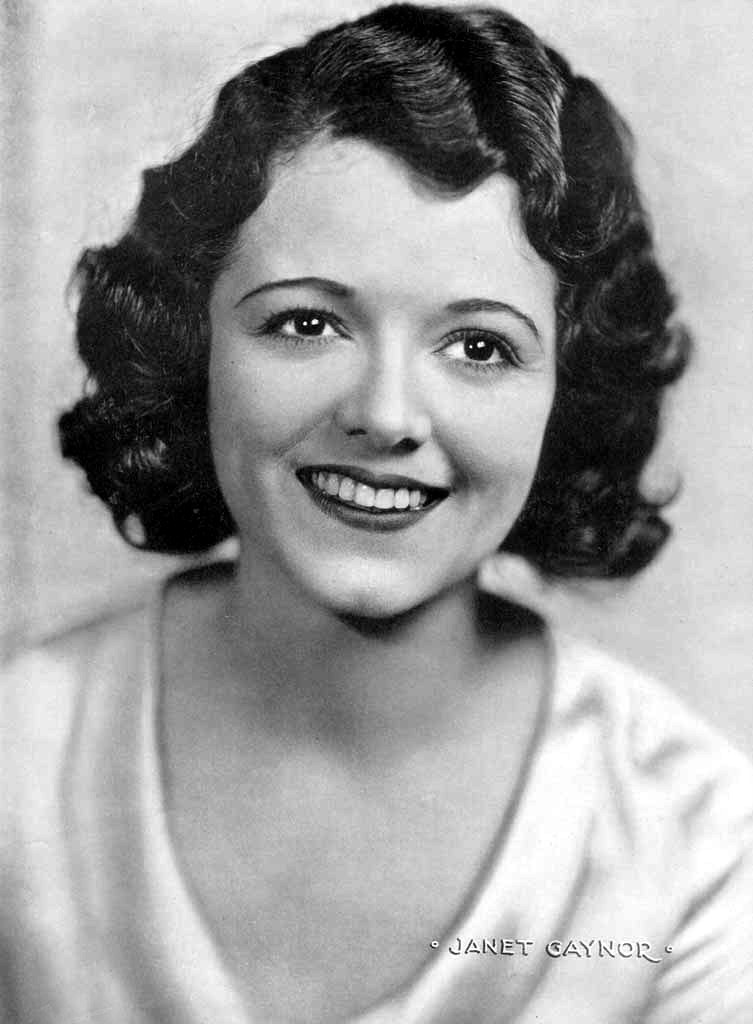
Janet Gaynor

== Cast ==
- Janet Gaynor as Judy Abbott
- Warner Baxter as Jervis Pendleton
- Una Merkel as Sally McBride
- John Arledge as Jimmy McBride
- Claude Gillingwater as Riggs
- Effie Ellsler as Mrs. Semple
- Kendall McComas as Freddie Perkins
- Kathlyn Williams as Mrs. Pendleton
- Elizabeth Patterson as Mrs. Lippett, the matron
- Louise Closser Hale as Miss Pritchard
- Sheila Bromley as Gloria
- Billy Barty as Orphan
- Edith Fellows as Orphan
- Clarence Geldart as Minister at Commencement
- Edwin Maxwell as Wykoff
- Steve Pendleton as Sally's Beau

== Production ==
Janet Gaynor had won the first Academy Award for Best Actress in 1928 and Warner Baxter had won the second Academy Award for Best Actor for his portrayal of the Cisco Kid in In Old Arizona by the time Daddy Long Legs was released. The screenplay was based on the stage play Daddy Long-Legs by Jean Webster.

Fox made French and Italian dubbed versions of the film and successfully sued a Dutch company for making a film based on the same material.
