= Daddy-Long-Legs (play) =

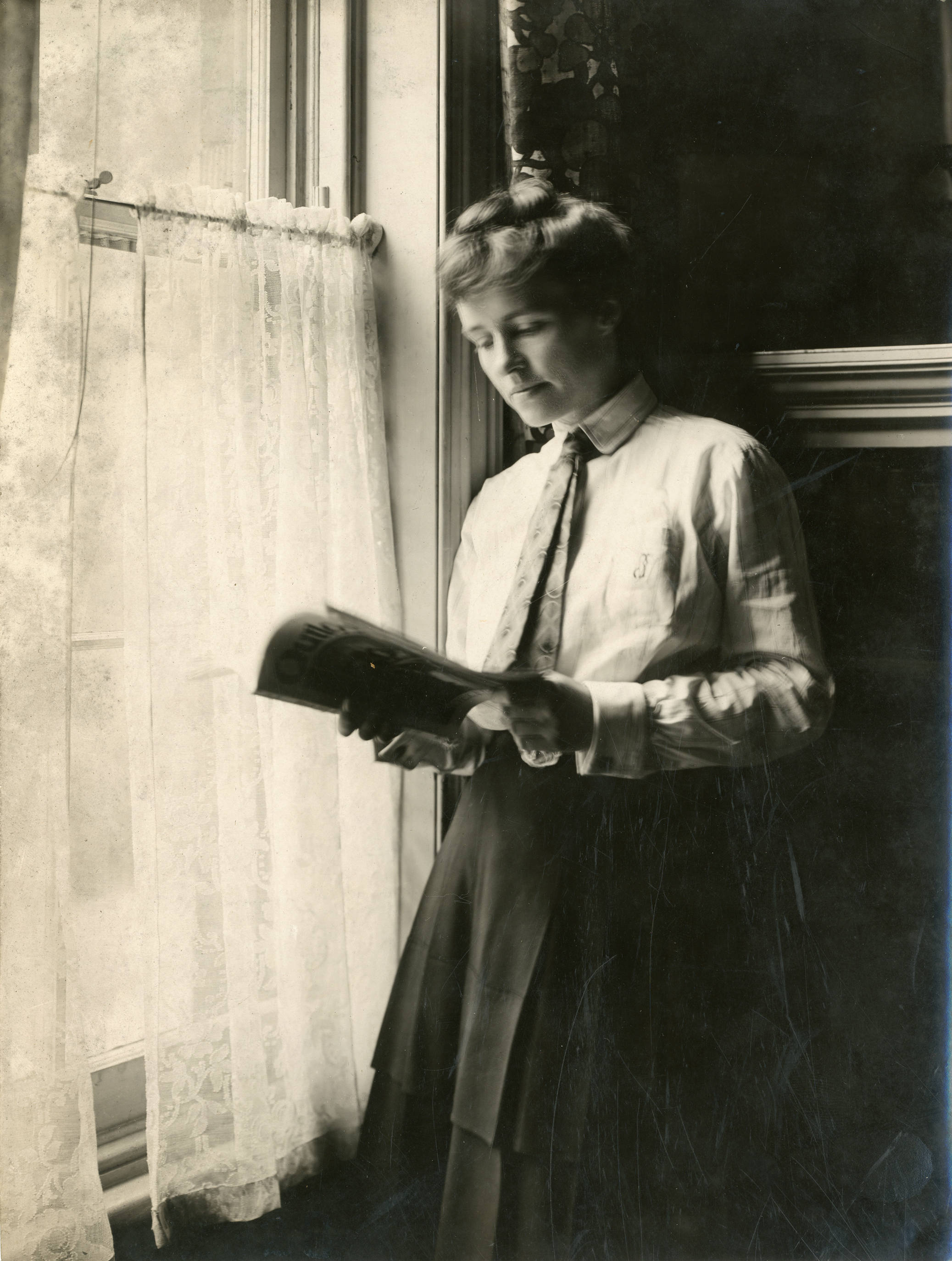
Jean Webster adapted her 1912 novel for the 1914 play, which made its debut on Broadway

Daddy-Long-Legs is a 1914 play by the American writer Jean Webster. Webster adapted it from her own 1912 epistolary novel Daddy-Long-Legs.

== Performance history ==
Daddy-Long-Legs debuted on Broadway at the Gaiety Theatre on September 28, 1914. The work had already been touring for four months prior to its Broadway run with Webster traveling with the production. The play was the first major success for actress Ruth Chatterton, and her portrayal of the character of Judy in this work brought her both critical acclaim and fame. Other performers in the original production included Charles Waldron as Jervis Pendleton, Cora Witherspoon as Sallie McBride, Harry Dodd as Cyrus Wycoff, Mabel Burt as Miss Pritchard, Gilda Leary Julia Pendleton, Robert Waters as Abner Parsons, Maud Erwin as Mamie, and Edward Howard as John Codman.

Well received in its initial production, Daddy-Long-Legs was revived on Broadway in 1918 at Henry Miller's Theater with Ruth Chatterton and Charles Waldron once again starring in the play. The revival cast also included the actress Lucia Moore as Miss Pritchard.

The play has toured the United States on multiple occasions.
