= Daddy-Long-Legs (2005 film) =

- Theatrical release poster
- Hangul: 키다리 아저씨
- RR: Kidari ajeossi
- MR: K'idari ajŏssi
- Directed by: Gong Jeong-shik
- Screenplay by: Kim Hyeong-jun
- Based on: Daddy-Long-Legs by Jean Webster
- Produced by: Kim Hyeong-jun
- Starring: Ha Ji-won; Yeon Jung-hoon
- Cinematography: Park Hee-ju; Im Jae-guk
- Edited by: Gyeong Min-ho
- Music by: Han Jae-kwon
- Distributed by: CJ Entertainment
- Release date: January 14, 2005
- Running time: 98 minutes
- Country: South Korea
- Language: Korean
- Box office: $2.5 million

Daddy-Long-Legs (Korean: 키다리 아저씨) is a 2005 South Korean romantic drama film. It was one of four Korean movies screened at the 2006 International Fajr Film Festival in Iran. The story is loosely inspired by the 1912 novel Daddy-Long-Legs by Jean Webster.

== Plot ==
Young-mi Cha, is a young woman who has lost her parents and is struggling to fend for herself. She receives the assistance of a stranger who pays her university fees and sends her gifts. She affectionately nicknames her benefactor "Daddy-Long-Legs".

After completing her studies and initially struggling for work, Young-mi eventually obtains her dream job as a program writer in a nationally syndicated radio station. On top of this, it has been arranged for her to stay rent-free in a nice house that the owner vacated for health reasons. Young-mi believes that her good fortune is the work of her "Daddy-Long-Legs".

One day, Young-mi receives an email from the owner of the house. The email was date-stamped to arrive at the house's computer on that specific day, though it was written and sent a year earlier.

The email details a love story written by the unseen owner of the house. The writer confesses that she has secretly been in love with a guy since her school days. In order to be near him, she worked hard to obtain a place in the same course at the institution he was studying in. Although she didn't have the courage to introduce herself, she was happy to see him every day. The writer explains that when he got a job at a radio station, she followed him there. But then she was diagnosed with a terminal disease which would cause her to lose her memory and then die. The writer's greatest fear is not of dying, but of losing her memory, which is why she wrote the email to be sent to herself in the future.

Young-mi is deeply touched by the story and decides to air its contents via the national radio program to locate the young man with whom the owner of the house was in love. The story is serialized and dramatized on the air, quickly becoming an audience favorite.

Meanwhile, Young-mi meets Kim Jun-ho, who works as a librarian in the radio station. They spend time together and Young-mi begins to fall in love with him. Young-mi then discovers that Jun-ho is the love interest mentioned in the email. Young-mi decides to end their relationship, guilty with the knowledge that someone somewhere out there has been in love with him for years.

Young-mi also investigates her "Daddy-Long-Legs", eventually learning that her current job and accommodations were the decisions of the radio station's director. She confronts him, but it turns out that the director was only acting on behalf of his younger brother, who chose to provide Young-mi with her school fees and asked that she be given her current job and his house to live in. It turns out the director's brother is Jun-ho, who is also the writer of the email. Jun-ho had switched genders when writing the email, and lost all of his earlier memories of Young-mi when they were students together and he loved her from afar; when they met in the radio station's library, it was the first time for both.

Young-mi is devastated by this news. She reconnects with Jun-ho and they spend as much time together before his illness relapses and he dies.

== Cast ==
- Ha Ji-won as Cha Young-mi
- Yeon Jung-hoon as Kim Jun-ho
- Park Eun-hye as girl in flashbacks
- Hyun Bin as guy in flashbacks
- Shin Yi as Kang Jong-jong

== Box office ==
The film received 528,817 admissions, and earned $2,534,233.
