= Daddy-Long-Legs (1919 film) =

1919 film

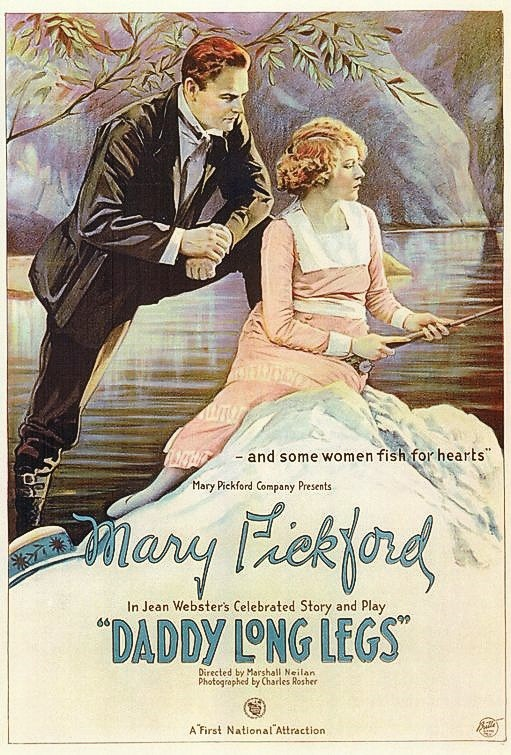
- Theatrical release poster
- Directed by: Marshall Neilan
- Written by: Agnes Christine Johnston
- Story by: Jean Webster
- Based on: Daddy-Long-Legs by Jean Webster
- Produced by: Mary Pickford
- Starring: Mary Pickford; Milla Davenport; Mahlon Hamilton
- Cinematography: Charles Rosher; Henry Cronjager (uncredited)
- Production company: Mary Pickford Corporation
- Distributed by: First National Pictures
- Release date: May 11, 1919
- Running time: 85 minutes
- Country: United States
- Language: Silent (English intertitles)
- Box office: $1.25 million

PLAY full digital copy of film; runtime 01:24:09.

Daddy-Long-Legs is a 1919 American silent comedy-drama film directed by Marshall Neilan, and based on Jean Webster's 1912 novel Daddy-Long-Legs. The film stars Mary Pickford.

== Plot ==
A police officer finds a baby in a trash can, and Mrs. Lippett, the cruel matron at an orphanage where children are made to work, names her "Jerusha Abbott" (she picks "Abbott" out of a phone book and gets "Jerusha" from a tombstone). The orphan, who comes to be called Judy, does what she can to stand up for the younger children, frequently clashing with both Mrs. Lippett and the cold hearted trustees. At one point she leads a rebellion against being served prunes with every meal and at another, steals a doll from a selfish rich girl to lend to a dying orphan.

Years later, wealthy Jervis Pendleton, a mysterious benefactor, pays to send Judy, now the oldest and most talented child in the orphanage, to college. He insists, however, that Judy must never try to contact him in person. Judy calls him "Daddy-Long-Legs," and writes to him, however. Judy proves popular with her wealthier and more "aristocratic" classmates, and writes a successful book to repay "Daddy-Long-Legs" the money he spent on her. She is generally happy but misses not having any real family members to take pride in her accomplishments. Judy also finds herself caught up in a romantic triangle with the older brother of a classmate and an older man (who is, unknown to her, her mysterious benefactor). She eventually chooses the older suitor and is delighted to learn that he is her "Daddy-Long-Legs."

== Cast ==
- Mary Pickford as Jerusha "Judy" Abbott
- Milla Davenport as Mrs. Lippett
- Miss Percy Haswell as Miss Pritchard
- Fay Lemport as Angelina Gwendolin Rosalind "Angie" Wykoff
- Mahlon Hamilton as Mr. Jervis Pendleton
- Lillian Langdon as Mrs. Pendleton
- Betty Bouton as Julia "Julie" Pendleton
- Audrey Chapman as Sallie "Sally" Mc Bride
- Marshall A. Neilan as Jimmie Mc Bride
- Carrie Clark Ward as Mrs. Semple
- Wesley Barry as Orphan Boy (uncredited)
- True Eames Boardman as Orphan Boy (uncredited)
- Jeanne Carpenter (uncredited)
- Estelle Evans (uncredited)
- Fred Huntley (uncredited)
- Frankie Lee (uncredited)
- Joan Marsh (uncredited)

== Critical review ==
The plot uses a series of episodes, some separated by time gaps, many humorous, that often pose opposites, like rich and poor or male and female, to advance the story. The treatment of the orphanage is modern and not sentimental, the hard life there is not funny. However, Judy is not an active agent in the story in that, while trying to make the best of her situation, things happen to her beyond her control.
