= Daddy-Long-Legs (novel) =

1912 epistolary novel by Jean Webster

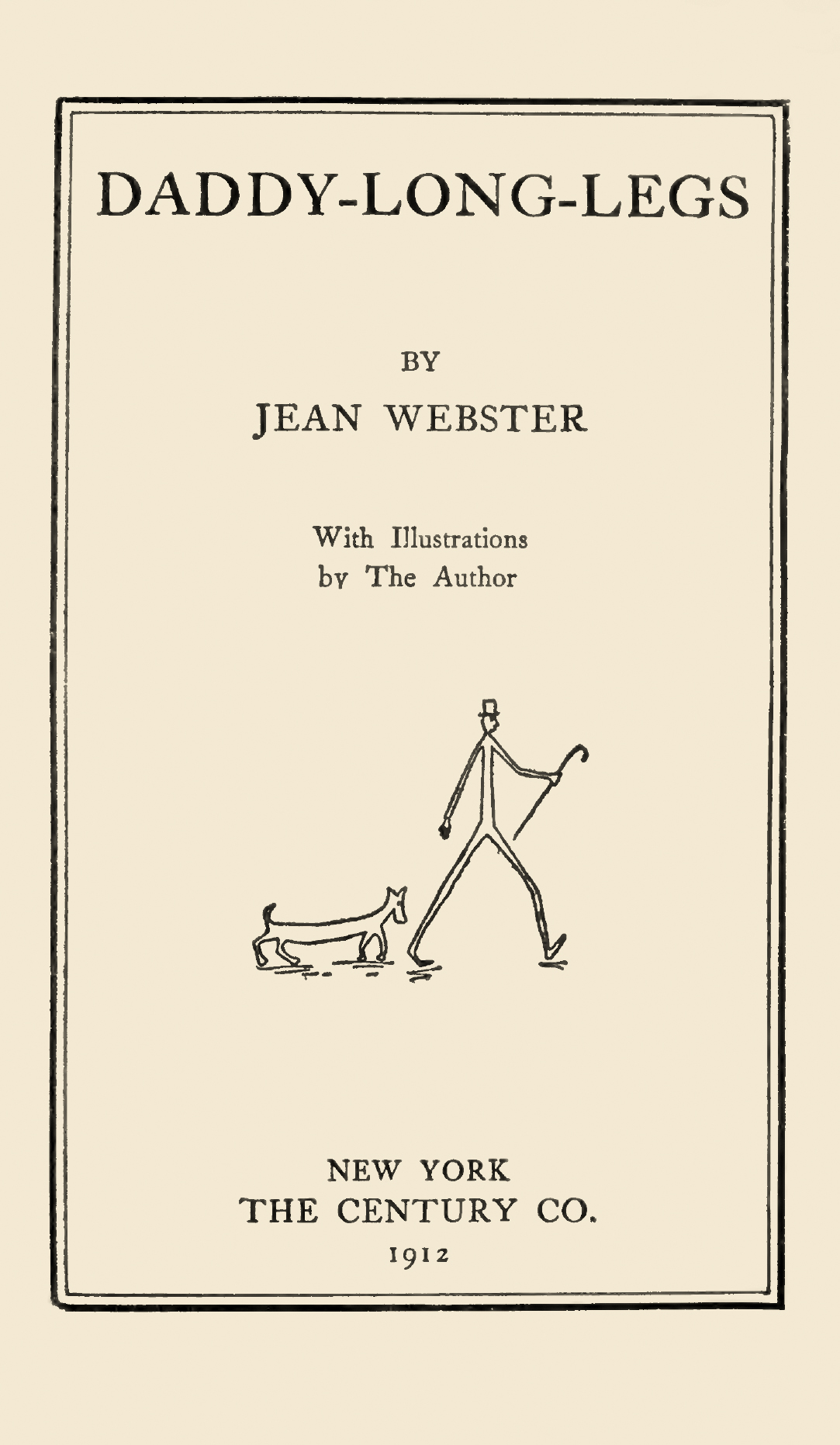
- 1912 first edition title page
- Author: Jean Webster
- Illustrator: John R. Neill, Jean Webster (magazine); Jean Webster (novel)
- Language: English
- Genre: Young adult, Children's literature
- Publisher: The Century Company
- Publication date: April – September 1912 (magazine); September 28, 1912 (novel)
- Media type: Print (hardcover)
- Pages: 304
- Followed by: Dear Enemy
- Text: Daddy-Long-Legs at Wikisource

Daddy-Long-Legs is a 1912 epistolary novel by the American writer Jean Webster. It follows the protagonist, Jerusha "Judy" Abbott, as she leaves an orphanage and is sent to college by a benefactor whom she has never seen. The novel was initially serialized in the April–September 1912 issues of the Ladies' Home Journal, and first published in book form by The Century Company on September 28, 1912.

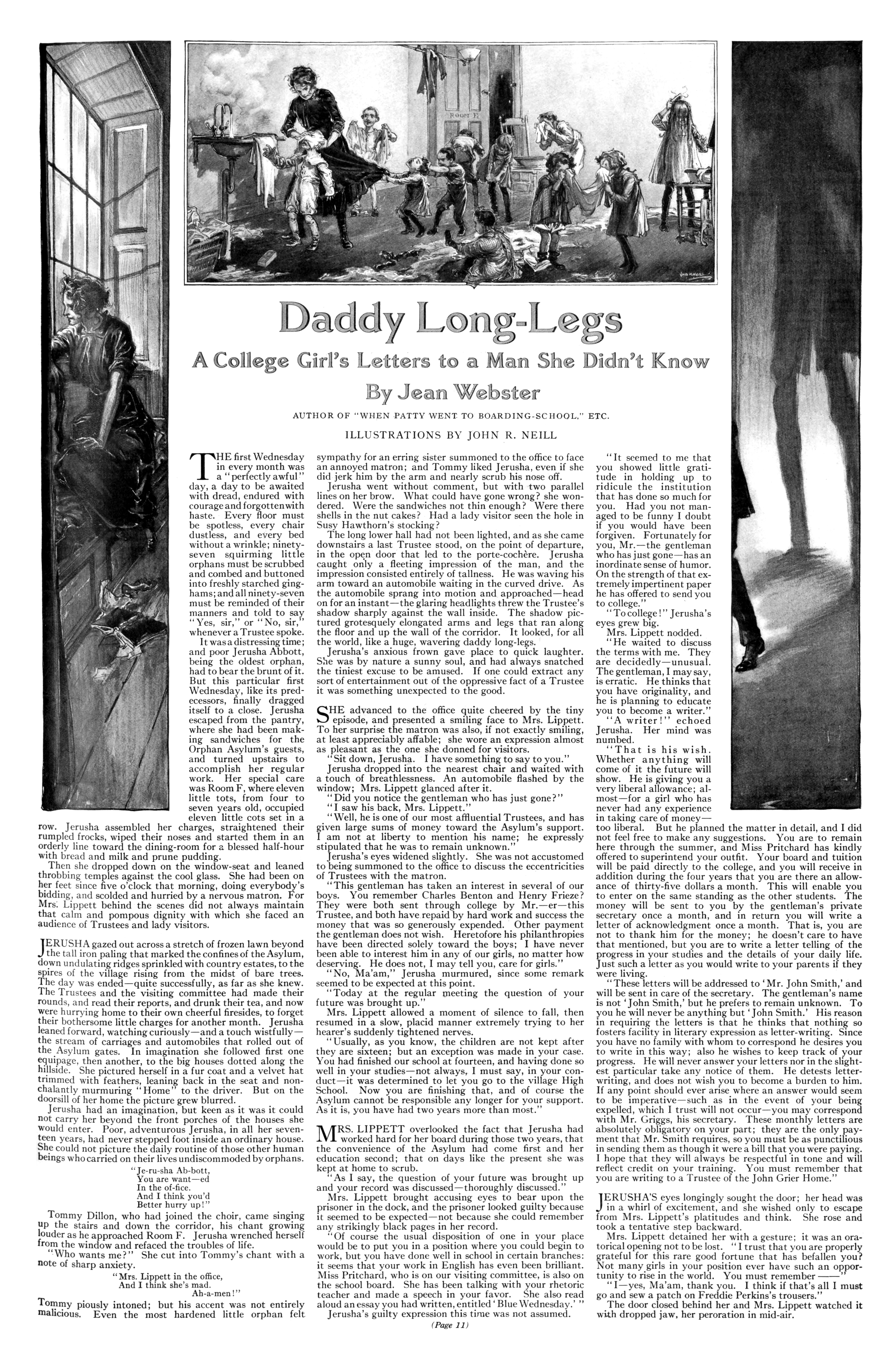
First page of the six-part serialization of Daddy-Long-Legs in The Ladies' Home Journal (April 1912)

== Plot summary ==
Jerusha "Judy" Abbott was brought up at the John Grier Home, an old-fashioned orphanage. The children were completely dependent on charity and had to wear other people's cast-off clothes. Jerusha's unusual first name was selected by the matron from a gravestone (she hates it and uses "Judy" instead), while her surname was selected out of the phone book.

One day, after the asylum's trustees have made their monthly visit, Judy is informed by the asylum's dour matron that one of the trustees has offered to pay her way through college. He has spoken to her former teachers and thinks she has potential to become an excellent writer. He will pay her tuition and give her a generous monthly allowance. Judy must write him a monthly letter because he believes that letter-writing is important to the development of a writer. However, she will never know his identity; she must address the letters to Mr. John Smith, and he never will reply.

Judy catches a glimpse of the shadow of her benefactor from the back, and knows he is a tall long-legged man. Because of this, she jokingly calls him Daddy-Long-Legs. She attends a women’s college on the East Coast of the United States. She illustrates her letters with childlike line drawings, also created by Jean Webster.

The book chronicles Judy's educational, personal, and social growth. One of the first things she does at college is to change her name to Judy. She designs a rigorous reading program for herself and struggles to gain the basic cultural knowledge to which she, growing up in the bleak environment of the orphanage, never was exposed.

During her stay, she befriends Sallie McBride (the most entertaining person in the world) and Julia Rutledge Pendleton (the least so) and sups with them and Leonora Fenton.

Afterwards, Judy graduates from college and is pursuing her dream to become a writer. However, Julia's uncle Jervis proposes to Judy and she refuses because someone like her wouldn't be good enough to marry a Pendleton. After this, Jervis catches a deadly illness during a trip to Canada. Meanwhile, Judy is excited to be invited to meet Daddy Long-Legs in New York City. When she arrives, she discovers that Jervis is Daddy Long-Legs. She reconsiders Jervis’ proposal and accepts him as her husband.

== Characters ==
Jerusha (Judy) Abbott - The protagonist of the story

Sallie McBride - Judy's college friend

Julia Rutledge Pendleton - Judy's college friend and Jervis's niece

Jervis Pendleton - who is eventually revealed to be Judy's benefactor

Jimmy McBride - Sallie's older brother

Daddy Longlegs - The mysterious man that sent Judy Abbot to college and financially supported her

== Dedication ==
The book is dedicated "To You." Today this book is often classified as children's literature, but at the time it was part of a trend of "girl" or "college girl" books which featured young female protagonists dealing with post-high-school concerns such as college, career, and marriage. These books predated the contemporary view of adolescence. Other authors who wrote in this vein include L. M. Montgomery and Louisa May Alcott. In Georgina Castle Smith's children's novel Nothing to Nobody (1873), Daddy Long Legs [sic] is the name of the orphaned urchin who receives the assistance.

== Current reception ==
Daddy-Long-Legs still receives good reviews. Reviewers comment on its relatability to a wide variety of audiences and unique nature in comparison to other modern books' – it isn't filled with action or melodrama, but rather just regular life. Reviewers also note that people tend to be attracted to orphans and orphanages, especially now that they have been mythologized in fiction such as Little Orphan Annie. Judy's being an orphan makes her sympathetic and allows for more room for her to learn and grow while in college, reviewers note.

== Stage and screen ==
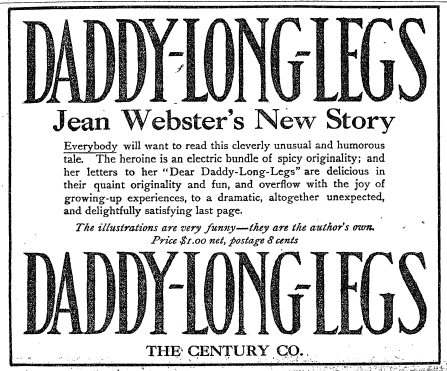
Advertisement for the book publication of Daddy-Long-Legs (1912)

This book was Webster's best-known work. Webster herself adapted it into a stage play that debuted in 1914. In addition, it was adapted into a 1952 British stage musical comedy called Love from Judy, as well as films in 1919 (starring Mary Pickford), 1931 (starring Janet Gaynor and Warner Baxter), 1935 (a Shirley Temple adaptation called Curly Top), a 1938 Dutch adaptation Vadertje Langbeen and a 1955 film, Daddy Long Legs (starring Fred Astaire and Leslie Caron). The latter two film versions departed considerably from the plot of the original novel.

A four-part adaptation was featured in 1978 in anime anthology series Manga Sekai Mukashi Banashi (1976-1979) by Dax International and Madhouse.

Ashinaga Ojisan, anime TV movie produced in 1979 by Tatsunoko Production.

The 1990 TV anime serial Watashi no Ashinaga Ojisan (My Daddy-Long-Legs) was directed by Kazuyoshi Yokota for the Nippon Animation studio as that year's installment of the studio's World Masterpiece Theater.

In India, the novel was adapted into a Malayalam movie, Kanamarayathu in 1984. Anokha Rishta, a Hindi remake by the same director was released in 1986.

The 2005 Korean movie Kidari Ajeossi has elements of Daddy-Long-Legs transferred into a modern setting.

In 2009, the novel was made into a two-person musical play by John Caird (book) and Paul Gordon (music), which premiered at the Rubicon Theatre Company (Ventura, California) and TheatreWorks (Palo Alto, California). On September 27, 2015, the musical premiered Off-Broadway at the Davenport Theatre with Megan McGinnis and Paul Alexander Nolan.

In 2020, the musical of Paul Gordon and John Caird was staged by director Aleksey Frandetti in Russia on the Instagram, transferring the events of the novel into the 21st century. In 2021, the musical play made into Dear Mr. Smith and was performed by the same actors Ivan Ozhogin and Yulia Dyakina at the Theatre "Shelter of Comedians" by the same director.
