= Jean Webster =

American novelist (1876–1916)

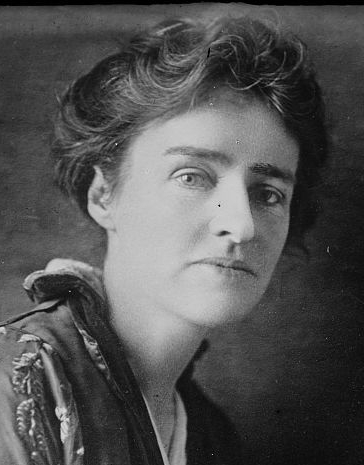
- Born: Alice Jane Chandler Webster; July 24, 1876; Fredonia, New York, U. S.
- Died: June 11, 1916 (aged 39); New York City, U. S.
- Occupations: Novelist and playwright
- Writing career
- Pen name: Jean Webster
- Period: 1899–1916
- Genre: Fiction

Jean Webster was the pen name of Alice Jane Chandler Webster (July 24, 1876 – June 11, 1916), an American author whose books include Daddy-Long-Legs and Dear Enemy. Her best-known books feature lively and likeable young female protagonists who come of age intellectually, morally, and socially, but with enough humor, snappy dialogue, and gently biting social commentary to make her books palatable and enjoyable to contemporary readers.

== Childhood ==
Alice Jane Chandler Webster was born in Fredonia, New York. She was the eldest child of Annie Moffet Webster and Charles Luther Webster. She lived her early childhood in a strongly matriarchal and activist setting, with her great-grandmother, grandmother and mother all living under the same roof. Her great-grandmother worked on temperance issues and her grandmother on racial equality and women's suffrage.

Alice's mother was niece to Mark Twain, and her father was Twain's business manager and subsequently publisher of many of his books by Charles L. Webster and Company, founded in 1884. Initially, the business was successful and, when Alice was five, the family moved to a large brownstone in New York, with a summer house on Long Island. However, the publishing company ran into difficulties, and increasingly the relationship with Mark Twain deteriorated. In 1888, her father had a breakdown and took a leave of absence, and the family moved back to Fredonia. He subsequently committed suicide in 1891 from a drug overdose.

Alice attended the Fredonia Normal School and graduated in 1894 in china painting. From 1894 to 1896, she attended the Lady Jane Grey School, 269 Court Street in Binghamton as a boarder. The specific address of the school has been a mystery. During her time there, the school taught academics, music, art, letter-writing, diction and manners to about 20 girls. The Lady Jane Grey School inspired many of the details of the school in Webster's novel Just Patty, including the layout of the school, the names of rooms (Sky Parlour, Paradise Alley), uniforms, and the girls' daily schedule and teachers. It was at the school that Alice became known as Jean. Since her roommate was also called Alice, the school asked if she could use another name. She chose "Jean", a variation on her middle name. Jean graduated from the school in June 1896 and returned to the Fredonia Normal School for a year in the college division.

== College years ==
In 1897, Webster entered Vassar College as a member of the class of 1901. Majoring in English and economics, she took a course in welfare and penal reform and became interested in social issues. As part of her course she visited institutions for "delinquent and destitute children". She became involved in the College Settlement House that served poorer communities in New York, an interest she would maintain throughout her life. Her experiences at Vassar provided material for her books When Patty Went to College and Daddy-Long-Legs. Webster began a close friendship with the future poet Adelaide Crapsey who remained her friend until Crapsey's death in 1914.

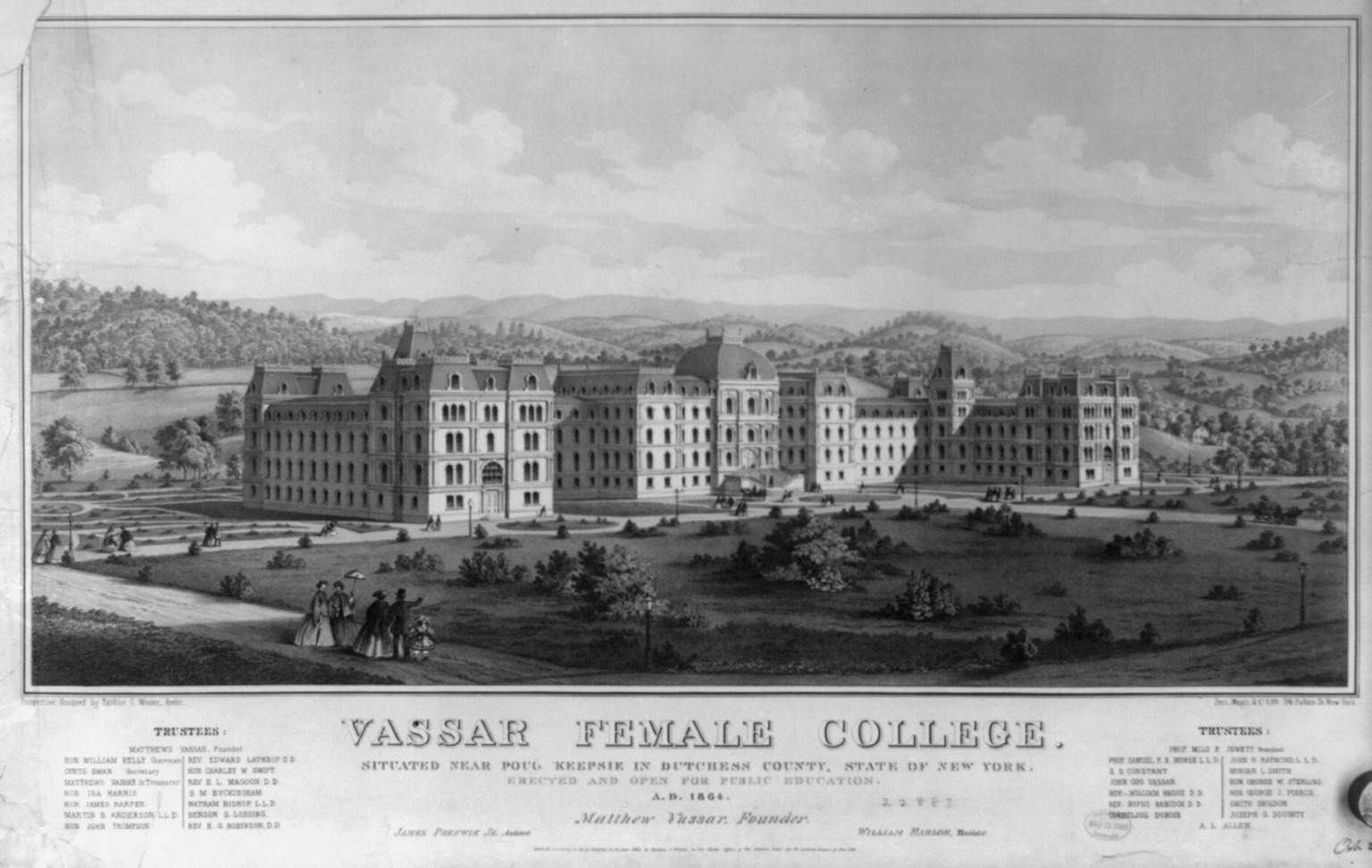
Vassar College in ca 1862

She participated with Crapsey in many extracurricular activities, including writing, drama, and politics. Webster and Crapsey supported the socialist candidate Eugene V. Debs during the 1900 presidential election, although as women they were not allowed to vote. She was a contributor of stories to the Vassar Miscellany and as part of her sophomore year English class, began writing a weekly column of Vassar news and stories for the Poughkeepsie Sunday Courier. Webster reported that she was "a shark in English" but her spelling was reportedly quite eccentric, and when a horrified teacher asked her authority for a spelling error, she replied "Webster", a play on the name of the dictionary of the same name.

Webster spent a semester in her junior year in Europe, visiting France and the United Kingdom, but with Italy as her main destination, including visits to Rome, Naples, Venice and Florence. She traveled with two fellow Vassar students, and in Paris met Ethelyn McKinney and Lena Weinstein, also Americans, who were to become lifelong friends. While in Italy, Webster researched her senior economics thesis "Pauperism in Italy". She also wrote columns about her travels for the Poughkeepsie Sunday Courier and gathered material for a short story, "Villa Gianini", which was published in the Vassar Miscellany in 1901. She later expanded it into a novel, The Wheat Princess. Returning to Vassar for her senior year, she was literary editor for her class yearbook and graduated in June 1901.

== Adult years ==
Back in Fredonia, Webster began writing When Patty Went to College, in which she described contemporary women's college life. After some struggles finding a publisher, it was issued in March 1903 to good reviews. Webster started writing the short stories that would make up Much Ado about Peter, and with her mother visited Italy for the winter of 1903–1904, including a six-week stay in a convent in Palestrina, while she wrote the Wheat Princess. It was published in 1905.

The following years brought a further trip to Italy and an eight-month world tour to Egypt, India, Burma, Sri Lanka, Indonesia, Hong Kong, China and Japan with Ethelyn McKinney, Lena Weinstein and two others, as well as the publication of Jerry Junior (1907) and The Four Pools Mystery (1908).

Jean Webster began an affair with Ethelyn McKinney's brother, Glenn Ford McKinney. A lawyer, he had struggled to live up to the expectations of his wealthy and successful father. Mirroring a subplot of Dear Enemy, he had an unhappy marriage due to his wife's struggling with mental illness; McKinney's wife, Annette Reynaud, frequently was hospitalized for manic-depressive episodes. The McKinneys' child, John, also showed signs of mental instability. McKinney responded to these stresses with frequent escapes on hunting and yachting trips as well as alcohol abuse; he entered sanatoriums on several occasions as a result. The McKinneys separated in 1909, but in an era when divorce was uncommon and difficult to obtain, they were not divorced until 1915. After his separation, McKinney continued to struggle with alcoholism but had his addiction under control in the summer of 1912 when he traveled with Webster, Ethelyn McKinney, and Lena Weinstein to Ireland.

During this period, Webster continued to write short stories and began adapting some of her books for the stage. In 1911, Just Patty was published, and Webster began writing the novel Daddy-Long-Legs while staying at an old farmhouse in Tyringham, Massachusetts. Webster's most famous work originally was published as a serial in the Ladies' Home Journal and tells the story of a girl named Jerusha Abbott, an orphan whose attendance at a women's college is sponsored by an anonymous benefactor. Apart from an introductory chapter, the novel takes the form of letters written by the newly styled Judy to her benefactor. It was published in October 1912 to popular and critical acclaim.

Webster dramatized Daddy-Long-Legs during 1913, and in 1914 spent four months on tour with the play, which starred a young Ruth Chatterton as Judy. After tryouts in Atlantic City; Washington, D.C.; Syracuse, New York; Rochester, New York; Indianapolis, Indiana; and Chicago, the play opened at the Gaiety Theatre in New York City in September 1914 and ran until May 1915. It toured widely throughout the U.S. The book and play became a focus for efforts for charitable work and reform; "Daddy-Long-Legs" dolls were sold to raise money to fund the adoption of orphans into families.

Webster's success was overshadowed by the battle of her college friend, Adelaide Crapsey, with tuberculosis, leading to Crapsey's death in October 1914. In June 1915, Glenn Ford McKinney was granted a divorce, and he and Webster were married in a quiet ceremony in September in Washington, Connecticut. They honeymooned at McKinney's camp near Quebec City, Canada and were visited by former president Theodore Roosevelt, who invited himself, saying: "I've always wanted to meet Jean Webster. We can put up a partition in the cabin."

Returning to the U.S., the newlyweds shared Webster's apartment overlooking Central Park and McKinney's Tymor farm in Dutchess County, New York. In November 1915, Dear Enemy, a sequel to Daddy-Long-Legs, was published, and it was a bestseller too. Also epistolary in form, it chronicles the adventures of a college friend of Judy's who becomes the superintendent of the orphanage in which Judy was raised. Webster became pregnant and according to family tradition, was warned that her pregnancy might be dangerous. She suffered severely from morning sickness, but by February 1916 was feeling better and was able to return to her many activities: social events, prison visits, and meetings about orphanage reform and women's suffrage. She also began a book and play set in Sri Lanka. Her friends reported that they had never seen her happier.

== Death ==
Jean Webster died on the morning of June 11, 1916 at the Sloane Hospital for Women. Her death has been attributed to complications, potentially puerperal fever, from the childbirth of her daughter who had been born the prior evening on June 10th and was named Jean (Little Jean) in her honor.

== Themes ==
Jean Webster was active political and socially, and often included issues of socio-political interest in her books.

=== Eugenics and heredity ===
The eugenics movement was a hot topic when Jean Webster was writing her novels. In particular, Richard L. Dugdale's 1877 book about the Jukes family as well as Henry Goddard's 1912 study of the Kallikak family were widely read at the time. Webster's Dear Enemy mentions and summarizes the books approvingly, to some degree, although her protagonist, Sallie McBride, ultimately declares that she doesn't "believe that there's one thing in heredity," provided children are raised in a nurturing environment. Nevertheless, eugenics as an idea of 'scientific truth'— generally accepted by the intelligentsia of the time— does come through in the novel.

=== Institutional reform ===
From her college years, Webster was involved in reform movements, and was a member of the State Charities Aid Association, including visiting orphanages, fundraising for dependent children and arranging for adoptions. In Dear Enemy she names as a model the Pleasantville Cottage School, a cottage-based orphanage that Webster had visited.

=== Women's issues ===
Jean Webster supported women's suffrage and education for women. She participated in marches in support of votes for women, and having benefited from her education at Vassar, she remained actively involved with the college. Her novels also promoted the idea of education for women, and her major characters explicitly supported women's suffrage.

== When Patty Went to College ==
When Patty Went to College
- Author: Jean Webster
- Language: English
- Publisher: The Century Company
- Publication date: 1903
- Publication place: United States
- Media type: Print (hardback & paperback)
- OCLC: 2185725

When Patty Went to College is Jean Webster's first novel, published in 1903. It is a humorous look at life in a women's college at the turn of the 20th century. Patty Wyatt, the protagonist of this story is a bright, fun-loving, imperturbable young woman who does not like to conform. The book describes her many escapades on campus during her senior year at college. Patty enjoys life on campus and uses her energies in playing pranks and for the entertainment of herself and her friends. An intelligent young woman, she uses creative methods to study only as much as she feels necessary. Patty is, however, a believer in causes and a champion of the weak. She goes out of her way to help a homesick freshman, Olivia Copeland, who believes she will be sent home when she fails three subjects in the examination.

The end of the book sees Patty reflecting on what her life after college might be like. She plays hooky from chapel and meets a bishop. In a chat with the bishop, Patty realizes that being irresponsible and evasive at a young age could adversely affect her character as an adult and decides to try to be a more responsible person.

The novel was published in the U.K. by Hodder and Stoughton in 1915 as Patty & Priscilla.

== Bibliography ==
- When Patty Went to College (1903)
- Wheat Princess (1905)
- Jerry Junior (1907)
- The Four Pools Mystery (1908)
- Much Ado About Peter (1909)
- Just Patty (1911)
- Daddy-Long-Legs (1912)
- Dear Enemy (1915)
- Ugolina of Biella (2026 Unpublished and rediscovered Novella by PublisHERstory)

== Biography ==
- Boewe, Mary (2007). "Bewildered, Bothered, and Bewitched: Mark Twain's View of Three Women Writers". Mark Twain Journal. 45 (1): 17–24.
- Simpson, Alan; Simpson, Mary; Connor, Ralph (1984). Jean Webster: Storyteller. Poughkeepsie: Tymor Associates. Library of Congress Catalog Number 84–50869.
- [IT] Sara Staffolani, C'è sempre il sole dietro le nuvole. Vita e opere di Jean Webster, flower-ed 2018. ISBN ebook 978-88-85628-23-6 ISBN cartaceo 978-88-85628-24-3
- Sara Staffolani, Every Cloud Has Its Silver Lining. Life and Works of Jean Webster, flower-ed 2021. ISBN 978-88-85628-85-4
