= Tunnel of Love =

Tunnel of love may refer to:

== Amusement rides and railways ==
- Tunnel of Love (railway), a section of industrial railway located near Klevan, Ukraine
- Tunnel of love, an amusement park boat ride also known as an Old Mill (ride)
- Tunnel of Love, the name of several amusement rides at Coney Island
- Tunnel of Love (railway line), a section of an abandoned industrial railway line located in Jiangning, Nanjing, China

== Arts, entertainment, and media ==
=== Music ===
==== Albums and EPs ====
- Tunnel of Love (album), a 1987 Bruce Springsteen album
- Tunnel of Love (EP), a 1996 EP by Insane Clown Posse

==== Songs ====
- "Tunnel of Love" (Dire Straits song), a 1980 Dire Straits song
- "Tunnel of Love" (Bruce Springsteen song), title song from the album
  - Tunnel of Love Express Tour, tour by Bruce Springsteen and the E Street Band promoting the album
- "The Tunnel of Love" (song), a 1983 song by Fun Boy Three from the album Waiting
- "Tunnel of Love", a 1958 song by Doris Day
- "Tunnel of Love", a song by Westlife from the 2000 Platinum edition of Westlife (album)

=== Television episodes ===
- "Tunnel of Love", 21 Jump Street season 5, episode 1 (1990)
- "Tunnel of Love", Ace Lightning season 1, episode 11 (2002)
- "Tunnel of Love", Dallas (1978) season 14, episode 5 (1990)
- "Tunnel of Love", Hacks season 1, episode 7 (2021)
- "Tunnel of Love", L.A. Law season 8, episode 19 (1994)
- "Tunnel of Love", The Upper Hand series 4, episode 19 (1993)

=== Other arts, entertainment, and media ===
- The Tunnel of Love (novel), a 1954 novel by Peter De Vries
  - The Tunnel of Love (play), a 1957 Broadway play by De Vries and Joseph Fields; the basis for the film
- The Tunnel of Love, a 1958 film starring Doris Day
- Tunnel of Love, a 1994 novel by Hilma Wolitzer
