= Al Hirschfeld Theatre =

Broadway theater in Manhattan, New York

- Martin Beck Theatre
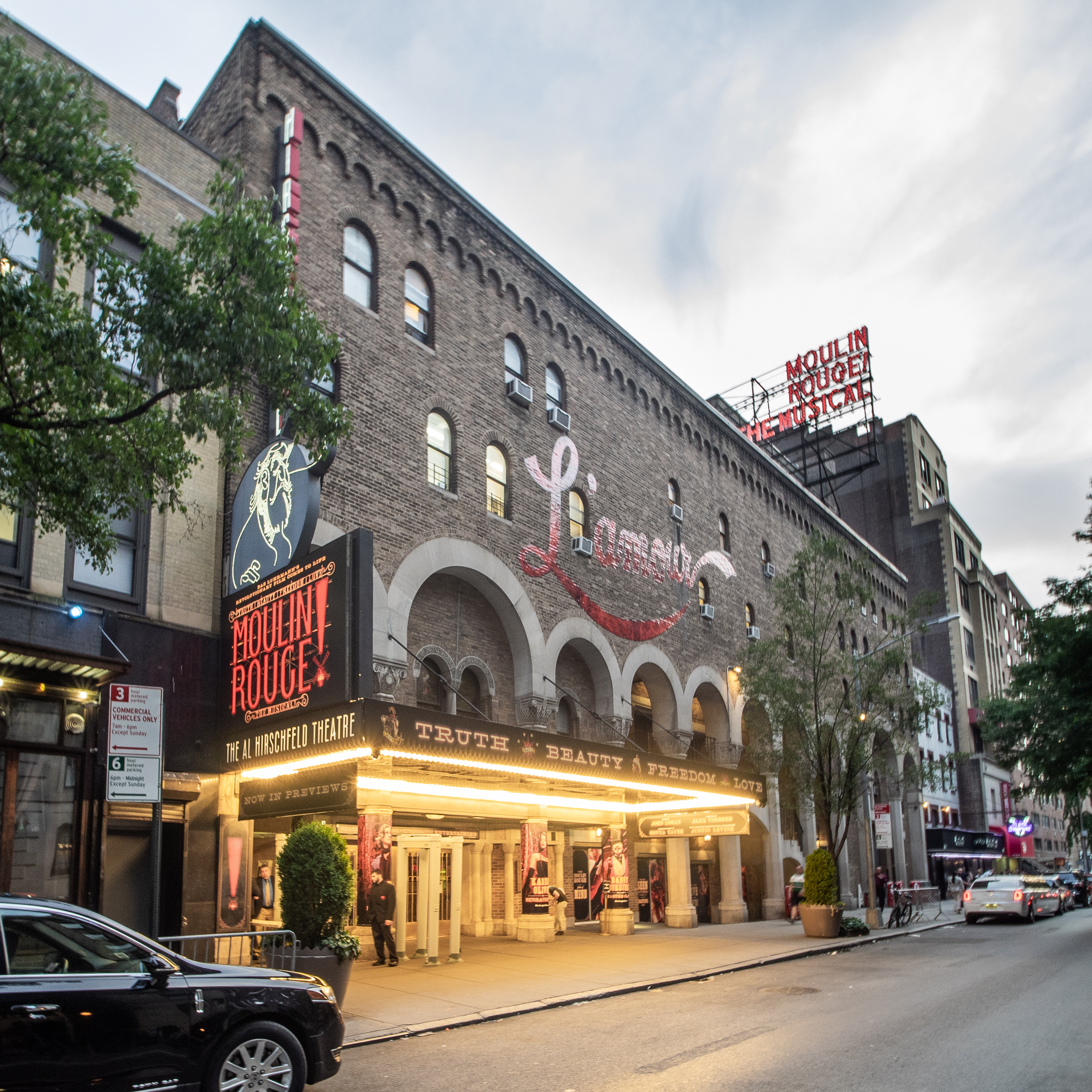
- Showing the musical Moulin Rouge! in 2019
- Interactive map of Al Hirschfeld Theatre
- Address: 302 West 45th Street; Manhattan, New York; United States
- Coordinates: 40°45′33″N 73°59′21″W
- Owner: ATG Entertainment
- Operator: ATG Entertainment
- Capacity: 1,424
- Type: Broadway
- Production: Now You See Me Live
- Public transit: Subway: Times Square–42nd Street/Port Authority Bus Terminal

Construction
- Opened: November 11, 1924 (102 years ago)
- Years active: 1924–present
- Architects: G. Albert Lansburgh; Albert Herter (interior)

Website
- us.atgtickets.com/venues/al-hirschfeld-theatre/

New York City Landmark
- Designated: November 4, 1987
- Reference no.: 1315
- Designated entity: Facade

New York City Landmark
- Designated: November 4, 1987
- Reference no.: 1316
- Designated entity: Lobby and auditorium interior

The Al Hirschfeld Theatre, originally the Martin Beck Theatre, is a Broadway theater at 302 West 45th Street in the Theater District of Midtown Manhattan in New York City, New York, U.S. Opened in 1924, it was designed by G. Albert Lansburgh in a Moorish and Byzantine style and was constructed for vaudevillian Martin Beck. It has 1,404 seats across two levels and is operated by ATG Entertainment. Both the facade and the interior are New York City landmarks.

The facades of the Al Hirschfeld's auditorium and stage house are designed as one unit. There is a double-height arcade with cast-stone columns at the base of the theater. The eastern section of the arcade contains the auditorium entrance, the center section includes a staircase with emergency exits, and the western section leads to the stage house. Red brick is used for the upper stories of the facade. Albert Herter, a muralist who frequently collaborated with Lansburgh, oversaw much of the interior design. A square ticket lobby is directly inside the main entrance, leading to a vaulted inner lobby and an L-shaped mezzanine lounge. The auditorium is decorated with ornamental plasterwork and contains a sloped orchestra level, a mezzanine level, and a curved sounding board. In addition, there are box seats at the balcony level, near the front of the auditorium. The auditorium has an octagonal ceiling with a multicolored dome.

Beck had proposed the theater in 1923, and it opened with a production of Madame Pompadour on November 11, 1924. It was the only theater in New York City to be owned outright without a mortgage. The Beck was used by several theatrical groups in its early years, including the Theatre Guild. After Martin Beck's death in 1940, the theater was managed by his wife Louise Heims Beck. The theater was purchased in 1966 by William L. McKnight of Jujamcyn Theaters, and it hosted several short runs during the 1970s and 1980s. The theater was renamed for Broadway illustrator Al Hirschfeld in 2003. Throughout the years, the theater has staged long-running productions including The Teahouse of the August Moon, Dracula, Into the Woods, Guys and Dolls, and Kinky Boots. Jujamcyn merged in 2023 with ATG, which continued to operate the theater.

== Site ==
The Al Hirschfeld Theatre is on 302 West 45th Street, on the south sidewalk between Ninth and Eighth Avenues, in the Theater District and Hell's Kitchen neighborhoods of Midtown Manhattan in New York City, New York, U.S. The land lot is rectangular. The lot covers 13,389 square feet (1,243.9 m^{2}), with a frontage of 133.33 ft (40.64 m) on 45th Street and a depth of 100.42 ft (31 m). The Al Hirschfeld Theatre shares the city block with the Film Center Building and the off-Broadway Davenport Theatre to the west. Across Eighth Avenue to the east are the Row NYC Hotel and the Majestic, John Golden, and Bernard B. Jacobs theaters. In addition, St. Luke's Lutheran Church, the off-Broadway St. Luke's Theatre, and The Whitby are to the north.

The Al Hirschfeld is the westernmost Broadway theater in the Theater District and the only one west of Eighth Avenue. (Note: The Vivian Beaumont Theater at Lincoln Center is west of Central Park West, a continuation of Eighth Avenue. However, it is outside the Theater District, on the Upper West Side.) When the venue was constructed in 1925, the block to the east already contained eight theaters. (Note: The Booth, Plymouth, Music Box, and Imperial theaters, as well as the former Astor, Bijou, Morosco, and Klaw theaters) The site of the theater itself, at 302 to 314 West 45th Street, was filled by seven brownstone townhouses of three stories each. Six of the houses, numbers 302 to 312, had been purchased by Nathan Wilson and then sold by Berkley Builders. The seventh house at number 314 was owned by Nellie Clauss.

== Design ==
The Al Hirschfeld Theatre, originally the Martin Beck Theatre, was designed by Gustave Albert Lansburgh in the Byzantine and Romanesque styles. The theater opened in 1924 and was built for Martin Beck (1868–1940), who originally named the venue for himself. The Beck was the only Broadway theater designed in a Byzantine style; most other Broadway theater buildings of the time were designed in a neoclassical style. Furthermore, Lansburgh specialized in designing movie palaces on the West Coast of the United States, including Los Angeles's Hill Street Theatre and San Francisco's Golden Gate Theater. H. H. Oddie Inc. built the theater, and numerous material suppliers and contractors were involved in the project. The Al Hirschfeld is operated by Jujamcyn Theaters.

=== Facade ===
The Al Hirschfeld's auditorium and stage house share a design for their facades, unlike with most other Broadway theaters, where the auditorium and stage house have distinct designs. The facade of the Al Hirschfeld is much wider than its length. The base of the theater contains a granite water table and a double-height arcade with cast-stone columns. The rest of the facade uses red brick. (Note: The brickwork is generally laid in rows of stretchers, with the long sides of the brick exposed. One out of every six rows are headers, with the wide sides of the brick exposed.)

==== Base ====
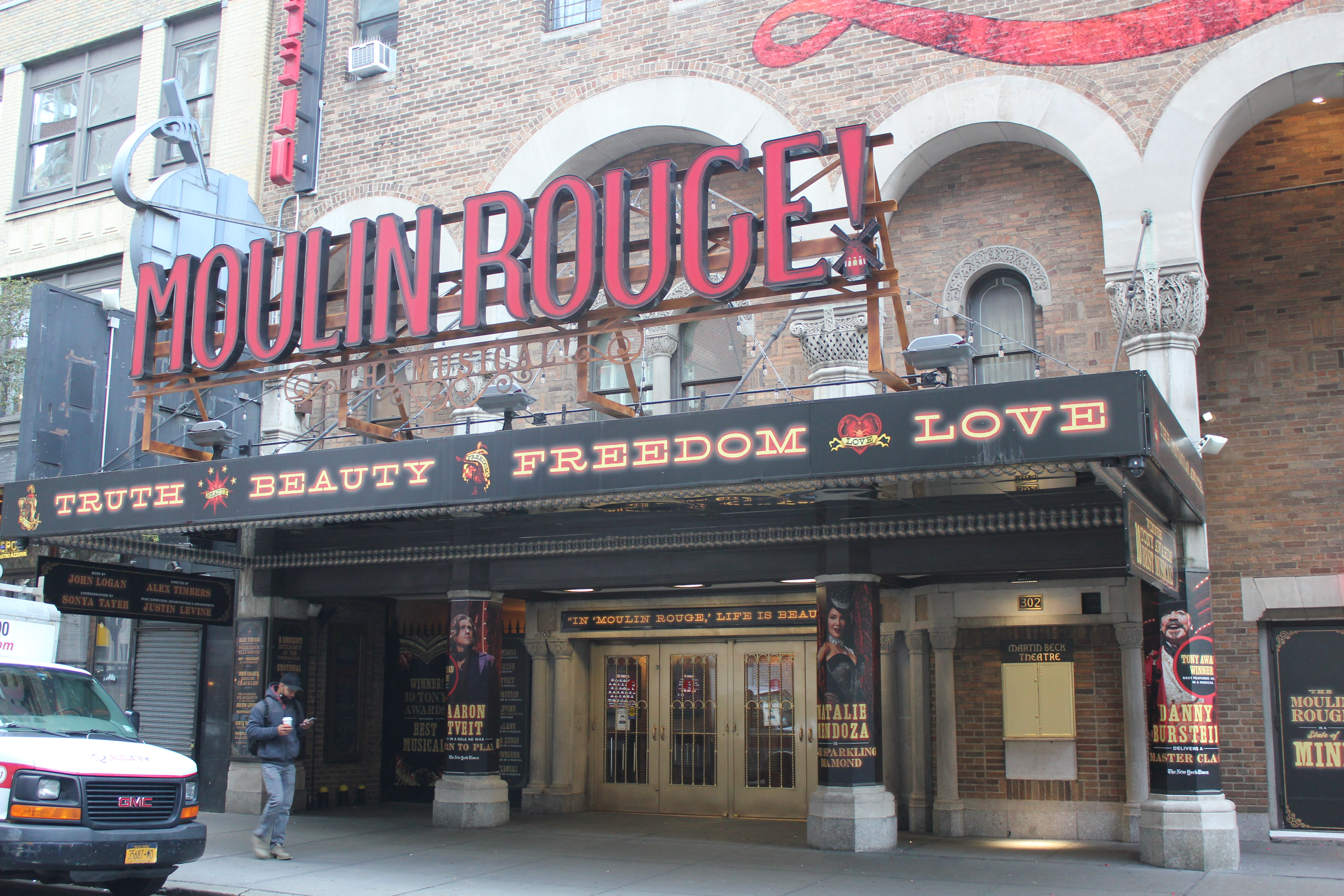
Doorways on the easternmost end of the facade

The arcade on the lowest two stories contains eleven arches. The second-outermost arch on either end is both taller and wider than the remaining arches. The octagonal columns rest on granite bases and contain capitals with both Moorish and Byzantine motifs. The tops of each arch contain stone borders. The presence of the arcade gives the theater's exterior a three-dimensional quality compared to other Broadway theaters' relatively flat facades.

The three easternmost arches contain the theater's main entrance. The doorway to the lobby is recessed within the second-easternmost arch (at the center of the three arches). It contains two bronze-and-glass double doors, which have bronze grilles with arch motifs. There are sheet-metal ceiling panels with light fixtures directly in front of the doors, as well as engaged columns flanking the doors. To the left (east) of the lobby entrance is a metal service door, a sign board, and a gate to a service alley. To the right (west) is a box office window with a marble sill and iron shutters; a panel above the window is inscribed with the words "Martin Beck Theatre". The box office window is also flanked by two pairs of engaged columns rounded and the other octagonal. Above the three arches is a modern marquee cantilevered from the arches. On the second floor are recessed brick walls. There are windows flanked by brick jambs and topped by round-arched stone panels. The center window opening is a double window separated by a stone colonette, while the other window openings are single.

The five center arches screen a stone fire-escape staircase. The underside of the staircase includes arches of varying sizes. The top of the staircase, to the east, contains two double metal doors from the balcony. Directly beneath the top of the staircase are two double metal doors from the orchestra level, which are topped by stone lintels and metal-and-glass lanterns. The bottom of the staircase, to the west, contains another doorway that is marked as a stage entrance; the words "Erected by Martin Beck 1924" are carved on an adjacent column.

The three westernmost arches contain recessed brick walls similar to those at the lobby entrance. The second-westernmost arch contains a double metal door at the ground story, while the westernmost (right) arch has a window at the ground story. The second story of the three western arches is similar to the second story above the main entrance, with arched brick windows.

==== Upper stories ====
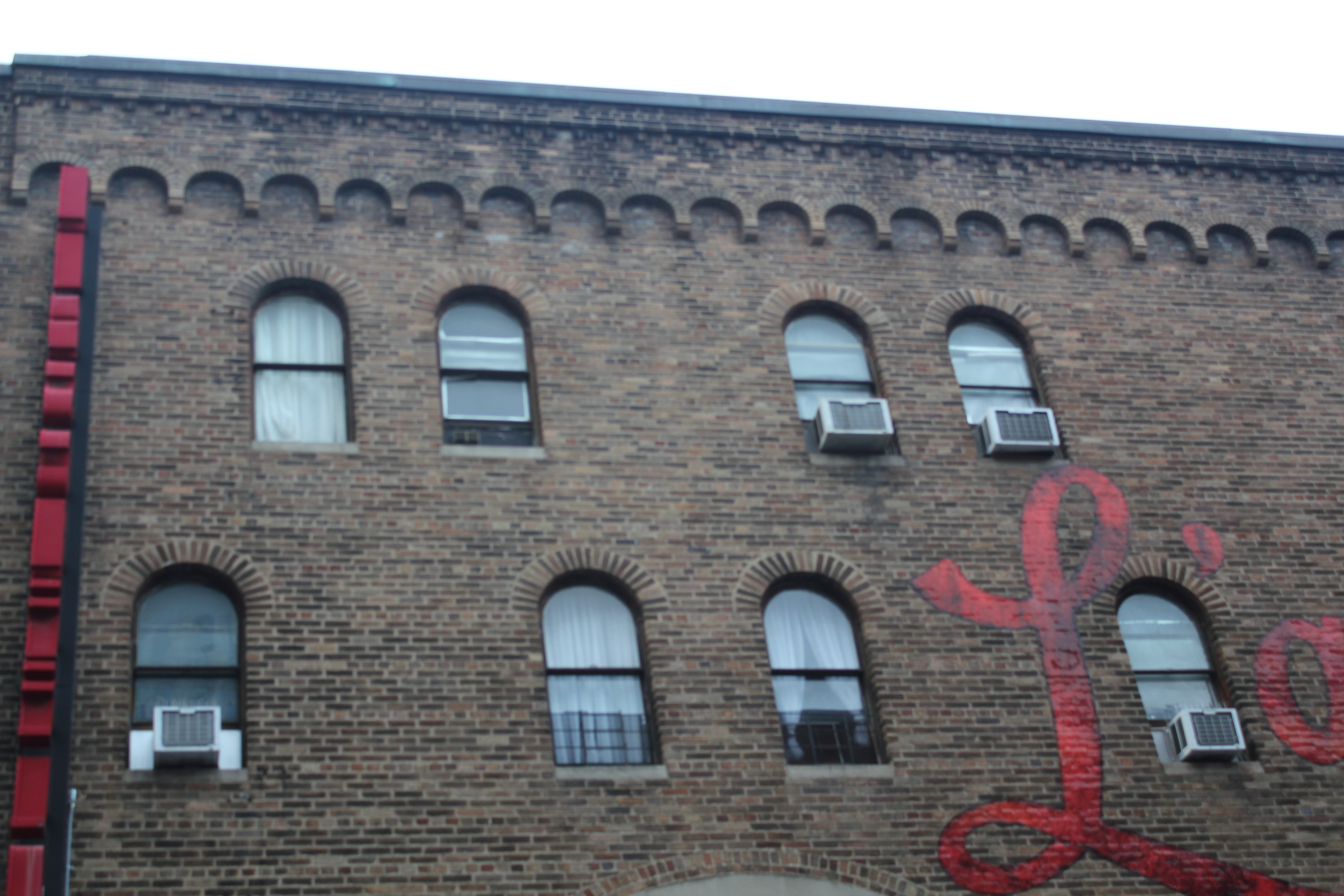
Upper-story windows on the facade of the auditorium

Above the arcade are additional stories with round-arched openings, each containing a one-over-one sash window. The facade of the auditorium, to the east, has two stories above the arcade. The stage house to the west has three stories. There is a corbel table with Romanesque-style round arches near the top of the facade; additional stories rise above the main roof. The upper stories of the stage house are set back from the main roof. In front of this is a large metal sign board facing east toward Eighth Avenue, which is used to display the name of the present production.

=== Interior ===
Beck had intended for the theater's interior to be more lavish than any other in the area. Albert Herter, a muralist who frequently collaborated with Lansburgh, oversaw much of the interior design. Herter's decorative scheme was largely in the Moorish and Byzantine styles. According to a contemporary source from the theater's opening, the decorative motifs were intended to depict various mythological scenes.

==== Lobbies ====
The square ticket lobby is directly inside the main entrance. It has stone walls and a groin-vaulted ceiling with Guastavino tiles. The walls on both sides contain segmental arches, and the western arches contain ticket windows. There are wrought-iron lamps on the west and east walls. The two double doors on the north wall lead from the street, while two glass-and-bronze double doors on the south wall connect to the inner lobby.

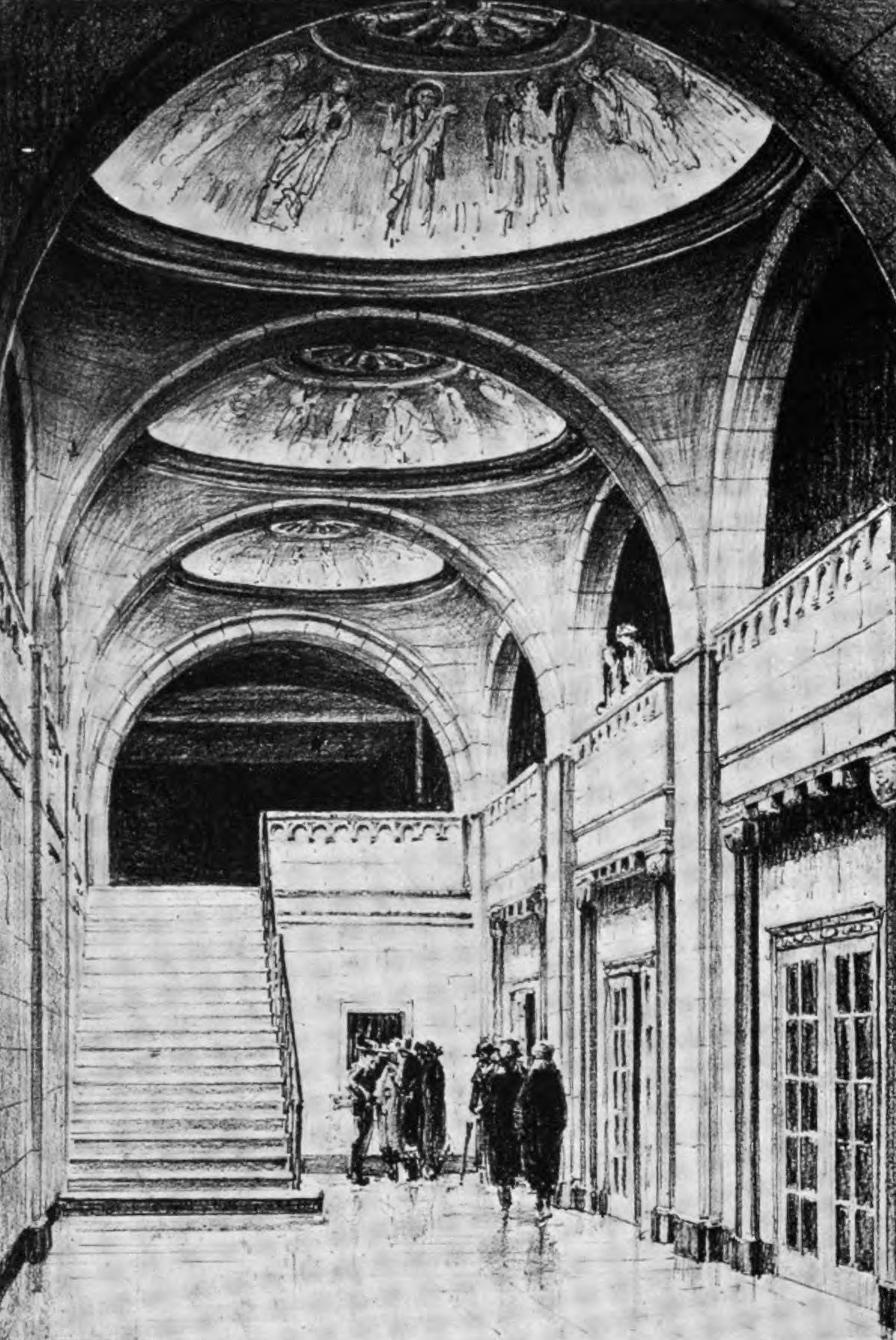
The inner lobby in 1925, facing south. The staircase to the mezzanine is at the southeast end, on the left. The doors to the orchestra, as well as the mezzanine lounge above it, are to the right.

The inner lobby is double-height and rectangular in plan, with a staircase to the mezzanine at the southeast end. It was originally decorated in cream-colored plaster. The northern wall (leading from the ticket lobby) is decorated with a molded panel. Above that is a large arch, which encompasses three smaller arched openings with geometric glass panes. The inner lobby contains piers on the west and east walls, with attached wrought-iron lighting sconces. These piers support three round arches on each side; a mezzanine-level lounge is behind the western arches. At ground level, the western wall contains modillions and pilasters, topped by capitals containing stylized-leaf and volute motifs. There are also leaded-glass double doors in the two outermost arches, which lead to the auditorium. At mezzanine level, both walls contain paneled railings with molded bands of dentils and bosses. Three circular ceiling domes rise from the wall arches. One contemporary source described the domes as depicting "figures in mediaeval costumes against a gold ground".

The mezzanine lounge is L-shaped. The short arm of the "L" is the staircase landing on the south, while the long arm runs above the western wall of the inner lobby. The piers on the lounge's eastern wall correspond to the piers on the inner lobby's western wall. The capitals of the piers contain stylized-leaf motifs, supporting the ceiling, which in turn is divided into half and full groin vaults. Wrought-iron sconces are installed on the piers. The southern end of the lounge contains a seating area, with a niche enclosing a marble water fountain. On the northern end, a staircase with a wrought-iron railing and ceiling lantern descends directly into the orchestra seating. The western wall includes doors that lead to the auditorium. The lounge is directly below the top row of mezzanine seating and is at the same level as the bottom mezzanine row. This removes the need for ticket-holders to climb to the top of the mezzanine seating before descending to their seat.

==== Auditorium ====
The auditorium has an orchestra level, a mezzanine-level balcony, boxes, and a stage behind the proscenium arch. The space is designed with plaster decorations in low relief. Playbill cites the theater as having 1,302 seats, while The Broadway League cites 1,404 seats. Originally, the theater seated 1,200 patrons, or 600 on either level. The original color scheme was red, blue, and orange, with some golden highlights. Byzantine motifs were used extensively in the design, and three murals decorated the side and rear walls. The seats were upholstered in a rose-red color, with blue highlights, while the auditorium was surrounded by blue draperies.

===== Seating areas =====
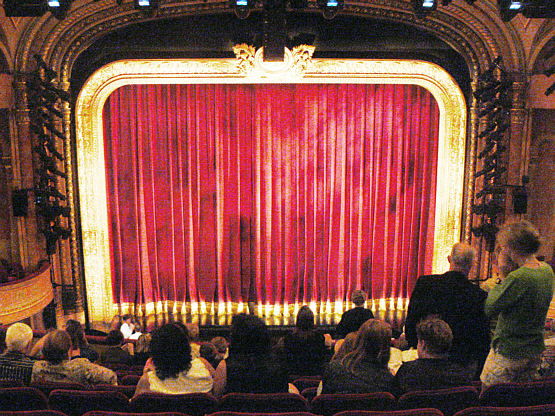
View from the mezzanine seating toward the proscenium arch

The orchestra level is wheelchair-accessible via the main doors. The rear or western end of the orchestra contains a promenade. Originally, the promenade had stained glass, bronze, marble, tapestries, and other objects from Martin Beck's collection. The orchestra level is raked, sloping down toward an orchestra pit in front of the stage. Near the front of the auditorium, stairs with wrought-iron railings lead up to the boxes. The side walls have exit doors, and the rear wall contains doorways from the inner lobby. In addition, wrought-iron lighting sconces are placed on the orchestra walls.

The mezzanine level can only be accessed by steps. The mezzanine and boxes share a front railing, which is decorated with geometric patterns in plasterwork. The side walls have wrought-iron lighting sconces. There are metal railings around the staircases to the orchestra and the passageways to the mezzanine lounge. Originally, the side walls also had tapestries. A technical booth is at the rear of the balcony, while light boxes are mounted onto the front rail. Moldings and bands divide the mezzanine's underside into paneled sections. Five of these panels contain circular wrought-iron grills with light fixtures.

On either side of the proscenium is a box at the mezzanine level, which contains a shallow S-curve that appears to spiral downward. At the orchestra level, decorated groups of columns support the bottoms of the boxes, which are paneled. The fronts of the boxes are ornamented with geometric patterns in plasterwork. There are also large clustered columns at the centers of each box, which support a fan vault. Within either box, between the proscenium and the clustered columns is an opening with four marble pilasters, topped by Byzantine and Moorish capitals, which support three arches. Above these triple arches are half-domes, which support the sounding board. Between either box and the mezzanine seats is another opening, formed by the clustered columns on one side and the auditorium wall on the opposite side.

===== Other design features =====
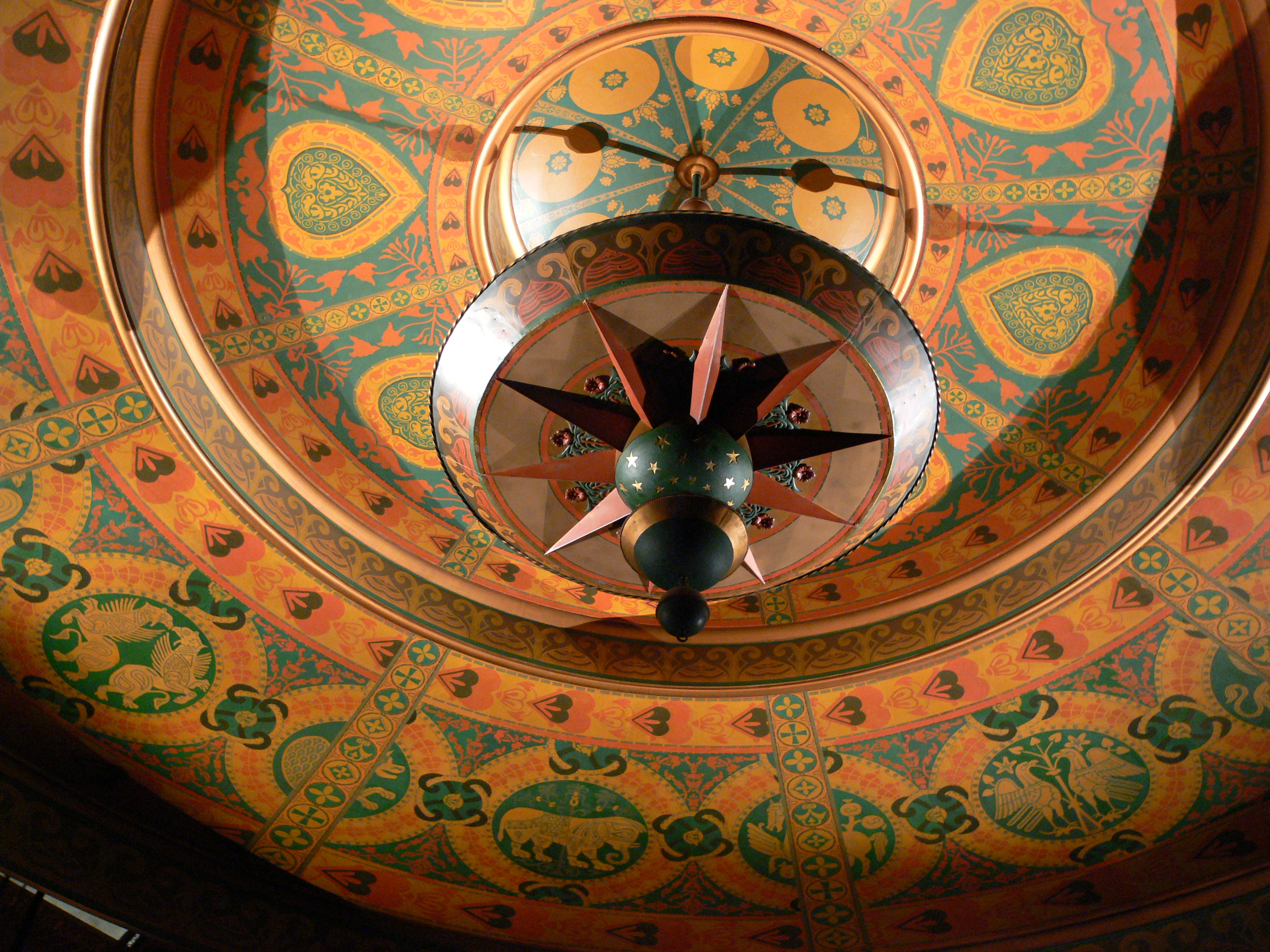
Auditorium ceiling, showing the painted chandelier hanging from the circular wooden dome

Next to the boxes is the proscenium with an elliptically arched opening. On either side of the proscenium are half-columns containing geometric designs, which support four concentric arches. Each column on either sides is made of stone upon a marble base and is carved in a different Byzantine motif from the other columns. Albert Herter also designed the theater's original curtain, which was hung across the proscenium opening. The curtain was originally decorated in the same red, orange, blue, and gold color scheme as the rest of the auditorium. The stage, covering 2,914 square feet (270.7 m^{2}), was Broadway's largest stage before the construction of the Vivian Beaumont Theater in the 1960s.

A perforated-plaster sounding board curves onto the ceiling above the boxes, in front of the proscenium arch. The ceiling itself is decorated with moldings, which divide the surface into recessed panels. The main section of the ceiling is an octagonal canopy. The center of the ceiling contains a large, circular wooden dome, which hangs from the octagonal ceiling panel via canvas strips. The dome and the canvas strips are both decorated in a red, yellow, and green color scheme with geometric designs. A painted glass chandelier is suspended from the dome's center.

== History ==
Times Square became the epicenter for large-scale theater productions between 1900 and the Great Depression. Manhattan's theater district had begun to shift from Union Square and Madison Square during the first decade of the 20th century. Most of the theaters built in the 1900s and 1910s were built on side streets near Broadway, but the Broadway-theater district expanded westward to Eighth Avenue and eastward to Sixth Avenue after World War II. Martin Beck was a vaudevillian who operated the Orpheum Circuit, which in the early 20th century was the dominant vaudeville circuit on the West Coast of the United States. In the early 1910s, he expanded to the East Coast and developed the Palace Theatre in New York City, which he soon lost to his rival Edward Albee. Although Beck was supplanted as the leader of the Orpheum Circuit in 1923, he wished to continue doing business in the city, and he planned a theater for legitimate shows.

=== Beck operation ===
==== Development and early years ====
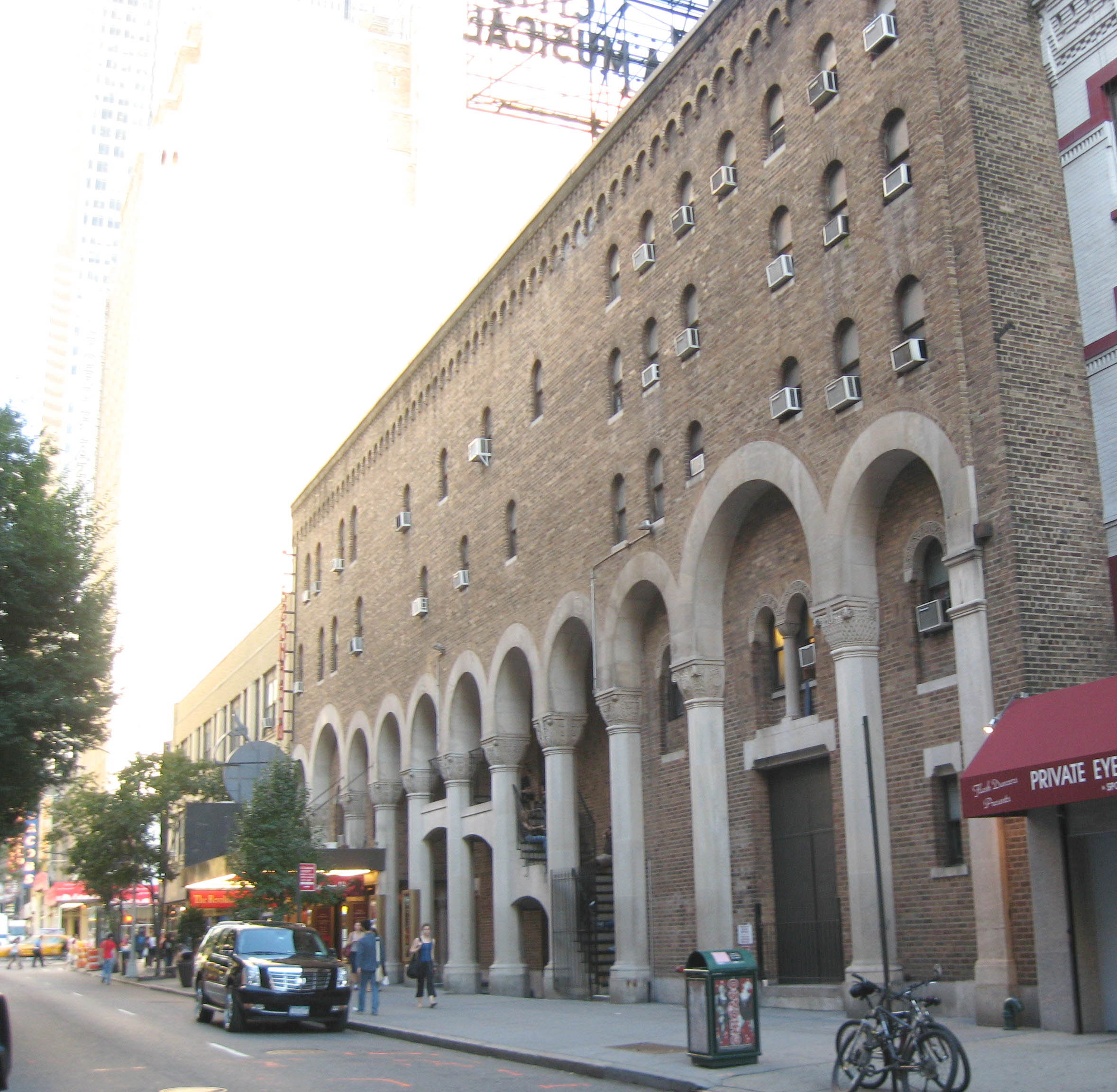
Daytime view of the Beck (later Hirschfeld), looking east

In July 1923, Martin Beck acquired six dwellings at 302 to 312 West 45th Street, with the intent of building a legitimate theater there. That September, Beck enlarged his site by buying a townhouse at 314 West 45th Street. The same month, Oddie and Falk were awarded the construction contract for the theater, which was to cost $1 million. The venue was to have a 1,160-seat capacity and a stage measuring 40 by 90 ft (12 by 27 m). The existing buildings on the site were being razed by November 1923. Beck's 45th Street theater, along with another one planned on 52nd Street, were part of an effort to shift the Theater District westward. Beck initially planned to open his namesake theater with a production of Imre Madách's The Tragedy of Man, but he instead decided to book the operetta Madame Pompadour after seeing it in London and several other European cities. Since Charles Dillingham had the rights to present Madame Pompadour in the United States, Beck convinced Dillingham to jointly produce the operetta at the new theater.

According to Martin Beck's wife Louise, the Beck was the only theater in New York City that, at its completion, was owned outright without a mortgage. The theater opened on November 11, 1924, with Madame Pompadour, which ultimately ran for 80 performances. This was followed in 1925 by a more popular show, a musical adaptation of the play Captain Jinks by Clyde Fitch, starring J. Harold Murray and Joe E. Brown for 167 performances. A. H. Woods subsequently leased the theater for his production of the John Colton play The Shanghai Gesture, starring Florence Reed, which opened at the Beck in 1926 and ran for 210 performances. The next year, the Beck hosted James Gleason's comedy The Shannons of Broadway, featuring Gleason and his wife Lucile, which had 288 performances.

==== Late 1920s to 1930s ====
In 1928, the Theatre Guild took over the Beck. The Guild's first production at the theater was Wings Over Europe, which opened at the end of the same year. Next, the Guild staged Dynamo by Eugene O'Neill, starring Glenn Anders and Claudette Colbert, which ran for 66 performances in early 1929. Later that year, the theater hosted the Czech comedy The Camel Through the Needle's Eye, as well as the Russian play Red Rust. The latter was the Theatre Guild Acting Company (later the Group Theatre)'s first production. In 1930, the Theatre Guild presented George Bernard Shaw's The Apple Cart, Philip Barry's Hotel Universe, and Sergei Tretyakov's Roar China! at the Beck. The Theatre Guild hosted Maxwell Anderson's play Elizabeth the Queen to the Beck in early 1931, starring Alfred Lunt and Lynn Fontanne. The Group Theatre had its first production that September with the opening of Paul Green's The House of Connelly. Lunt and Fontanne returned to the theater in the Guild's Reunion in Vienna later that year.

The Abbey Irish Theatre Players performed at the Martin Beck Theatre for the 1932–1933 season, their first New York City appearance since 1911. Their productions included The Far-off Hills, The New Gossoon, Juno and the Paycock, and Playboy of the Western World. The Abbey Theatre departed in January 1933, and the Beck hosted the play The Lake, featuring film star Katharine Hepburn, the same year. Sidney Howard's docudrama Yellow Jack was presented next in 1934. The D'Oyly Carte Opera Company commenced a season of Gilbert and Sullivan works at the Beck in September 1934, performing 11 operettas and running for 15 weeks. Next was a revival of Shakespeare's Romeo and Juliet in late 1934, featuring Basil Rathbone and Katharine Cornell. Cornell and Burgess Meredith starred in two plays in 1935: The Barretts of Wimpole Street, also featuring Brian Aherne and Brenda Forbes, and Flowers of the Forest, also featuring Margalo Gillmore. Later in 1935, Anderson's Winterset opened at the Beck, featuring Meredith, Margo, and Eduardo Ciannelli.

Cornell's husband Guthrie McClintic had directed several of the mid-1930s plays at the Martin Beck Theatre, including Romeo and Juliet and Winterset. Also among these were Shaw's play Saint Joan, which opened in 1936 and featured Cornell, Maurice Evans, and Tyrone Power Jr. The D'Oyly Carte Opera Company returned in August 1936 to perform another set of Gilbert and Sullivan operettas, running through to the end of the year. Another Anderson play, High Tor, opened in 1937 and starred Meredith, Peggy Ashcroft, and Hume Cronyn for 171 performances. Also in 1937, the Beck hosted the play Barchester Towers with Ina Claire, for which some of the orchestra seating was temporarily removed and walled off. In 1938, the theater hosted Victoria Regina, featuring Helen Hayes, for 87 performances. The D'Oyly Carte Opera Company hosted yet another season of Gilbert and Sullivan shows early the next year. Hayes returned later in 1939, performing in the drama Ladies and Gentlemen for 105 performances.

==== 1940s to early 1960s ====
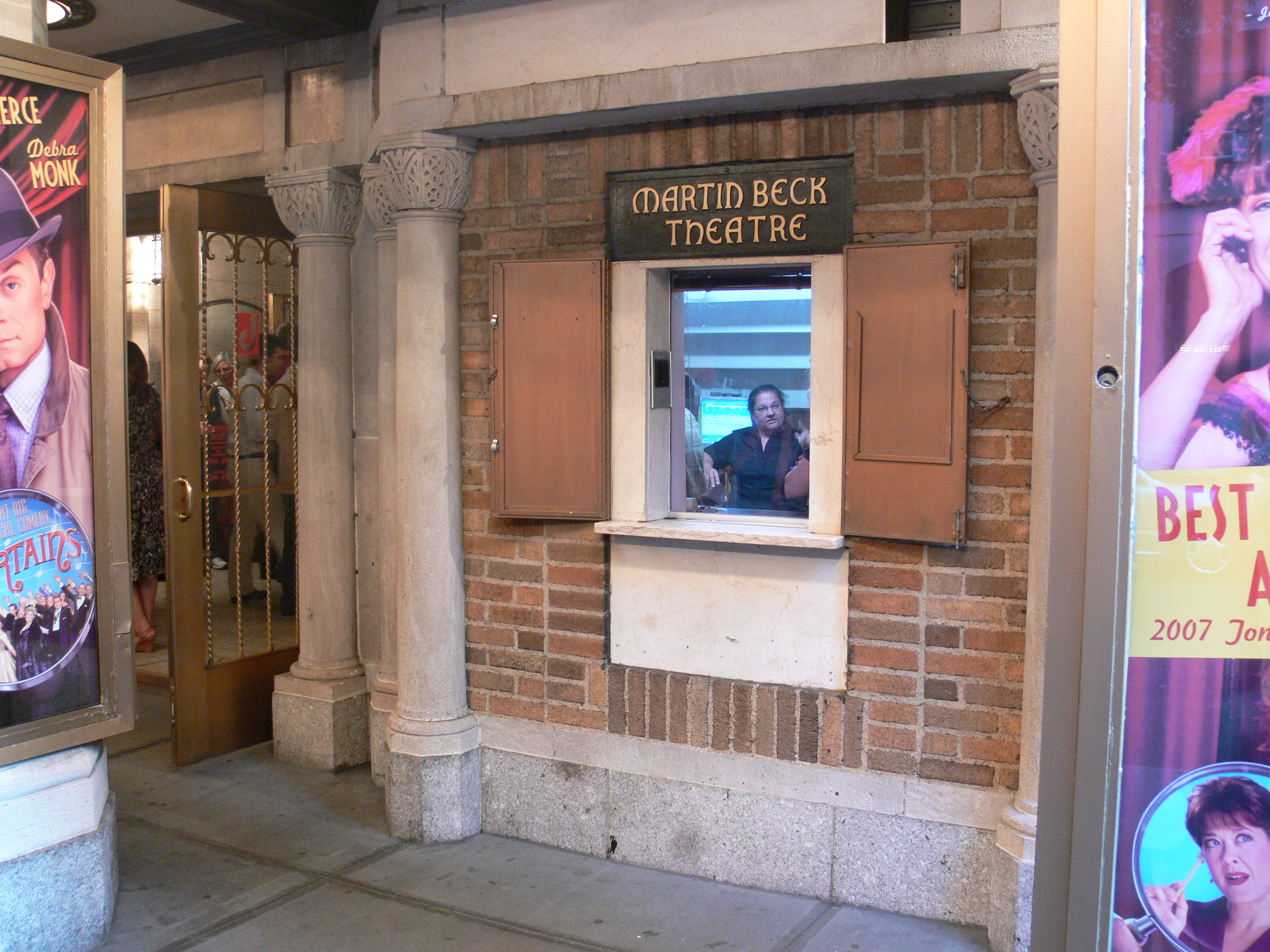
Ticket booth showing the still visible Martin Beck Theatre name above the window

The play Lady in Waiting, adapted from Margery Sharp's novel of the same name, ran at the Beck for 87 performances in 1940. Martin Beck died later the same year, and Louise Beck and Louis A. Lotito took over the theater. Lillian Hellman's A Watch on the Rhine opened in 1941 and ran for 378 performances. Lunt and Fontanne returned to the theater the next year with the opening of S. N. Behrman's play The Pirate, which had 176 performances. Members of the United States Army then presented five plays in August 1943, and Richard Rodgers and Herbert Fields's musical A Connecticut Yankee opened that November. The next year, Berhman's Jacobowsky and the Colonel opened at the Beck, running for 417 performances. The Beck hosted the play Foolish Notion with Tallulah Bankhead and Donald Cook in 1945, followed the same year by Leonard Bernstein, Betty Comden, and Adolph Green's popular musical On the Town, the latter of which ran for six months.

Harold Arlen and Johnny Mercer's musical St. Louis Woman was presented at the Beck in 1946, and O'Neill's The Iceman Cometh was staged that year. This was followed the next year by the musical Barefoot Boy with Cheek, featuring Nancy Walker, and a revival of Antony and Cleopatra, featuring Katharine Cornell. Revivals of Shaw's play You Never Can Tell and Jerome Kern's Sally were presented at the Beck in 1948, followed by That Lady in 1949 with Cornell. Next, the Beck hosted The Wisteria Trees with Helen Hayes, as well as a translation of Jean Anouilh's Ring Round the Moon, in 1950. The following year, Tennessee Williams's The Rose Tattoo starred Eli Wallach and Maureen Stapleton, Maxwell Anderson's Barefoot in Athens had a short run in 1951, as did Truman Capote's The Grass Harp in 1952. This was followed in 1953 by Arthur Miller's The Crucible.

The John Patrick comedy The Teahouse of the August Moon, starring David Wayne, opened in October 1953 and ultimately ran for 1,027 performances over two and a half years. The Beck then hosted a revival of Shaw's Major Barbara in 1956, as well as a musical version of Candide. Tennessee Williams's Orpheus Descending opened in 1957, featuring Maureen Stapleton and Cliff Robertson, but it only ran for 68 performances. By contrast, the Norman Krasna comedy Who Was That Lady I Saw You With? had 208 performances in 1958, while Williams's Sweet Bird of Youth lasted for 375 performances in 1959. Other appearances at the Beck in the late 1950s included performances from Israel's Inbal Dance Theater in 1958 and Les Ballets Africains in 1959. Louis Lotito's group City Playhouses Inc. took a ten-year lease on the theater in August 1958.

Charles Strouse and Lee Adams's first collaboration, the musical Bye Bye Birdie featuring Dick Van Dyke and Chita Rivera, opened at the Beck in April 1960 and stayed for 607 performances. Afterward, the theater hosted Jerry Herman's musical Milk and Honey, which opened in 1961 and stayed for a year and a half. In 1963, the theater staged Mother Courage and Her Children with Anne Bancroft, Barbara Harris, and Gene Wilder; a transfer of Strange Interlude; and Edward Albee's version of The Ballad of the Sad Café with Colleen Dewhurst and Michael Dunn. The play The Physicists with Jessica Tandy and Hume Cronyn, as well as the musical I Had a Ball with Richard Kiley and Buddy Hackett, both opened at the Beck in 1964. This was followed the next year by the Royal Shakespeare Company's production of Marat/Sade.

=== Jujamcyn and ATG operation ===
==== Late 1960s to 1980s ====
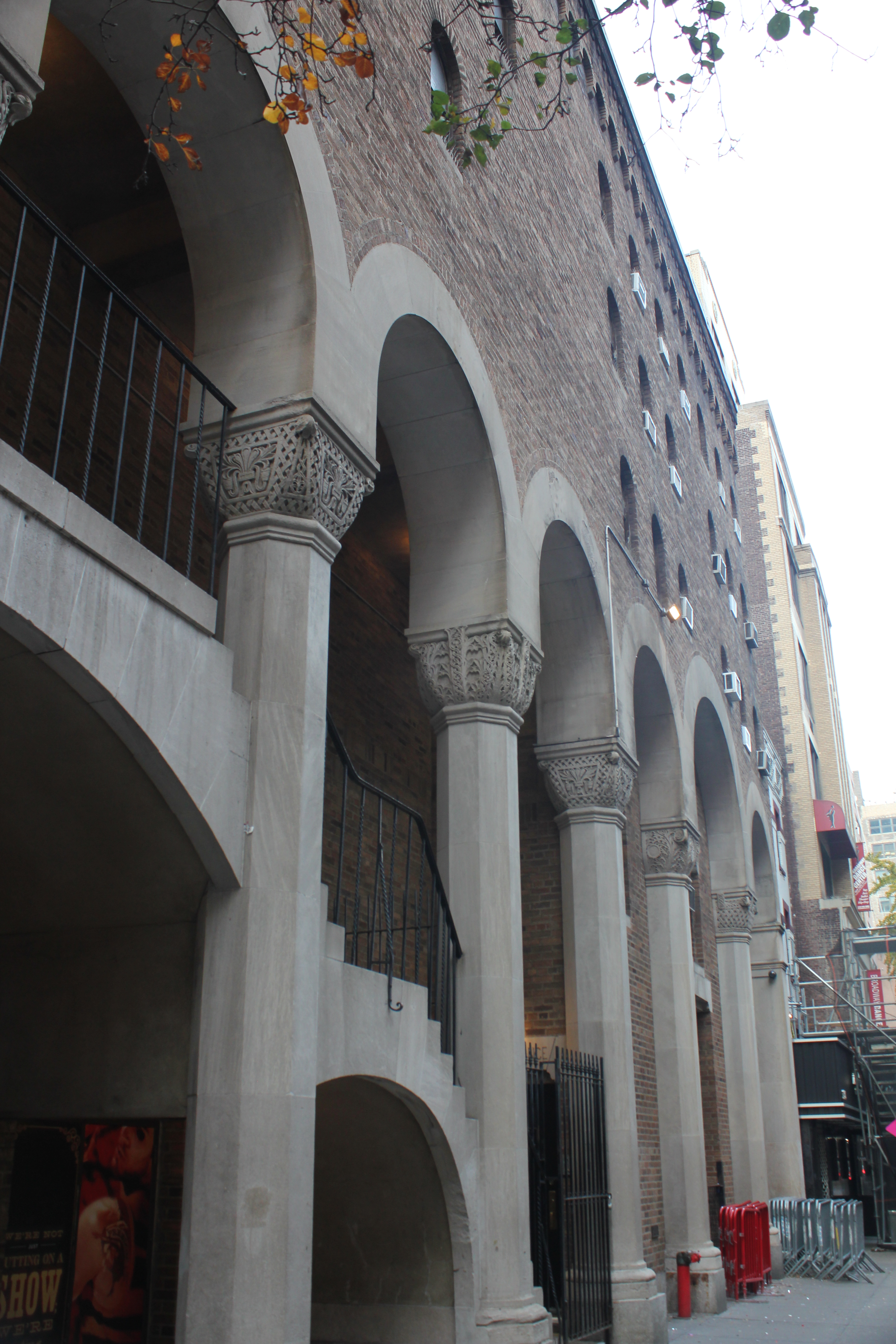
Side view of the theater's facade

Minnesota Mining & Manufacturing president William L. McKnight, who headed Jujamcyn Theaters and already operated the St. James Theatre, offered Louise Beck $1.5 million for the Martin Beck Theatre in December 1965. McKnight also offered to buy out Lotito's lease on the theater, which was to expire in three years. The sale was finalized in February 1966, with McKnight paying $1.35 million to Louise Beck and $150,000 to Lotito. McKnight would not receive the property title until the next month, after Marat/Sade was set to close. Under Jujamcyn's operation, the Beck hosted the Albee play A Delicate Balance, featuring Tandy, Cronyn, Rosemary Murphy, and Marian Seldes, in 1966. The next year, the theater staged a production of Comden, Green, and Jule Styne's musical Hallelujah, Baby!. In 1968, the off-Broadway musical Man of La Mancha relocated to the Beck, staying for three years.

Many of the Beck's productions in the 1970s were short-lived. In 1971, the Beck hosted Albee's All Over with Tandy, Dewhurst, Betty Field, and George Voskovec, as well as the musical The Grass Harp, based on Capote's play two decades earlier. Two productions during the decade had just one performance: Ring Around the Bathtub on April 29, 1972, and No Hard Feelings on April 8, 1973. The British play Habeas Corpus was presented at the Beck in late 1975, running for 95 performances. In 1976, McKnight transferred the Beck and Jujamcyn's other venues to his daughter Virginia and her husband James H. Binger. Finally, the theater had a hit in 1977 with the opening of the play Dracula, featuring Frank Langella, which ran for 925 performances.

In 1981, the Beck hosted the Lillian Hellman play The Little Foxes, featuring Elizabeth Taylor, and the Robert Brush and Martin Charnin musical The First. This was followed in 1982 by the Michael Stewart play Come Back to the Five and Dime, Jimmy Dean, Jimmy Dean with Cher, as well as A Little Family Business with Angela Lansbury. The Royal Shakespeare Company returned in 1983 with All's Well That Ends Well, and the musical The Rink with Liza Minnelli and Chita Rivera was staged at the Beck in 1984, running for 204 performances. On the other hand, Requiem for a Heavyweight managed just three performances in March 1985, and the following month's revival of the musical Take Me Along closed on its opening night. The next hit at the Beck was Into the Woods, with music by Stephen Sondheim and James Lapine, which opened in 1987 and had 765 performances. Another popular production at the theater was Grand Hotel, which premiered in late 1989 and stayed two years before transferring to another theater.

The New York City Landmarks Preservation Commission (LPC) had started considering protecting the Beck as an official city landmark in 1982, with discussions continuing over the next several years. The LPC designated both the facade and the interior as landmarks on November 4, 1987. This was part of the LPC's wide-ranging effort in 1987 to grant landmark status to Broadway theaters. The New York City Board of Estimate ratified the designations in March 1988. Jujamcyn, the Nederlanders, and the Shuberts collectively sued the LPC in June 1988 to overturn the landmark designations of 22 theaters, including the Beck, on the merit that the designations severely limited the extent to which the theaters could be modified. The lawsuit was escalated to the New York Supreme Court and the Supreme Court of the United States, but these designations were ultimately upheld in 1992.

==== 1990s to present ====
After the closure of Grand Hotel in early 1992, the musical Guys and Dolls was revived that year, running until 1995. Following this, Laurie Metcalf starred in My Thing of Love, which ran at the Beck for 13 performances in May 1995. That October, Ken Ludwig's Moon Over Buffalo opened at the Beck with Carol Burnett and Philip Bosco; it lasted for 308 performances. The Beck was renovated in 1996, a project that involved extending the mezzanine level forward by three rows. Magician David Copperfield performed in the show Dreams & Nightmares that year. Afterward, a revival of the musical Annie opened in March 1997, running for 238 performances. The Rodgers and Hammerstein musical The Sound of Music, featuring Rebecca Luker and Richard Chamberlain, was revived at the Beck in 1998 for 533 performances. The musical Kiss Me, Kate was revived at the Beck in late 1999, running through the end of 2001 after nearly closing due to the September 11 attacks. This was followed in 2002 by the musical Sweet Smell of Success, which had 108 performances, as well as a revival of Man of La Mancha.

In late 2002, Jujamcyn announced that the Martin Beck Theatre would be renamed after illustrator Al Hirschfeld the following June, celebrating what would be his 100th birthday. This would make Hirschfeld the first visual artist with a Broadway theater named for him. Jujamcyn President Rocco Landesman described the renaming as "an important event for the history and heritage of Broadway". Hirschfeld died in January 2003, months before he would have turned 100, though he knew the theater would be renamed for him. A celebration and tribute to Hirschfeld were held on June 23, 2003, featuring performers drawn by Hirschfeld during his career. The Al Hirschfeld Theatre was renovated after Man of La Mancha closed. The theater constructed a new marquee with an illuminated version of Hirschfeld's Self-Portrait as an Inkwell. Red neon initially represented the "ink" on the marquee, but blue neon was later substituted; Playbill said the red neon gave the "macabre" impression that the figure on the marquee was using ink from its own head. The mezzanine lounge received 22 reproductions of Hirschfeld drawings, which depict plays and actors that appeared at the theater.

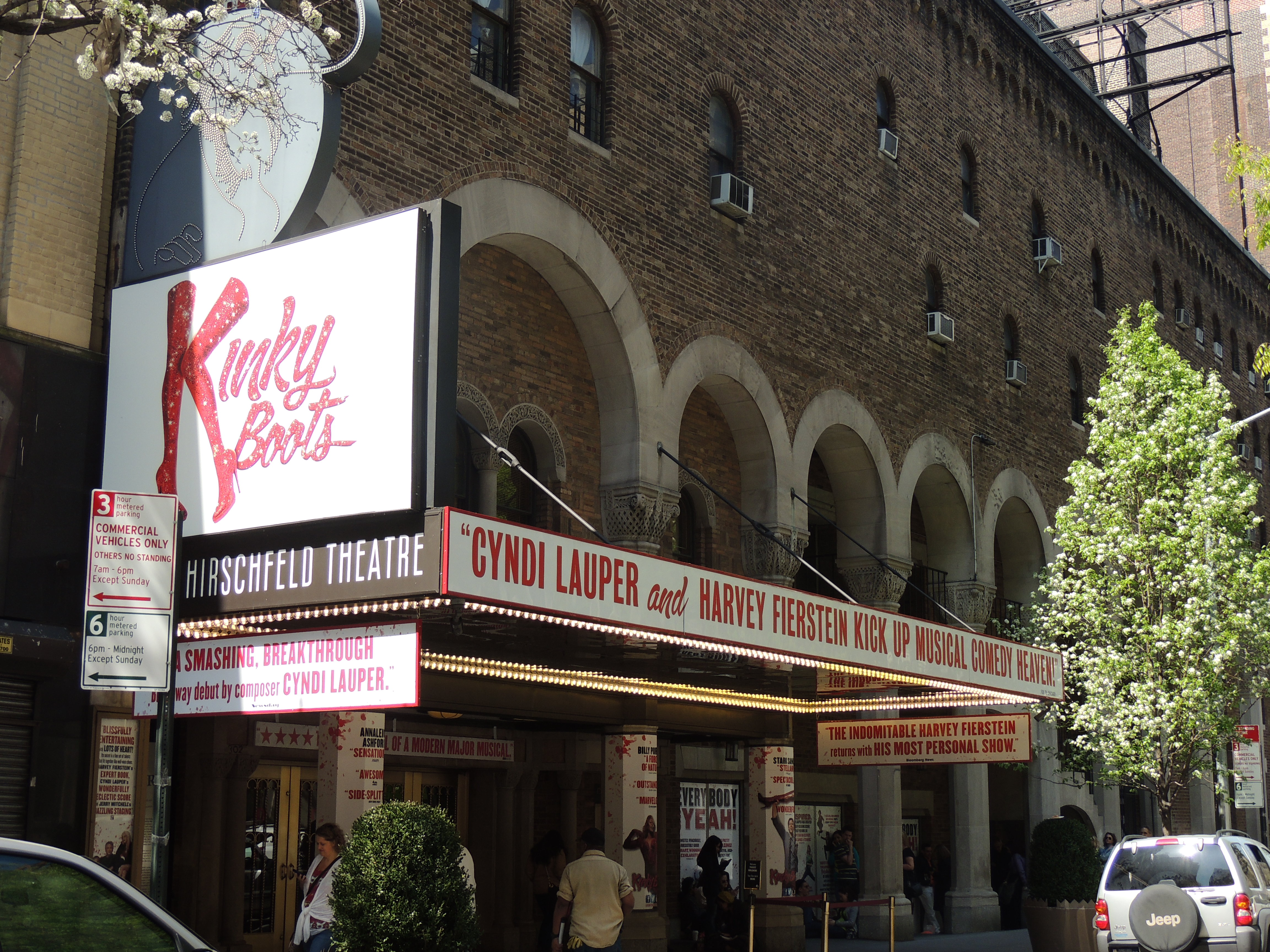
Kinky Boots at the Al Hirschfeld

The Al Hirschfeld reopened on November 23, 2003, with a revival of the musical Wonderful Town; it ran for 497 performances. After Binger died in 2004, Landesman bought the Al Hirschfeld and Jujamcyn's four other theaters in 2005, along with the air rights above them. Jordan Roth joined Jujamcyn as a resident producer the same year. The musical Sweet Charity opened at the Al Hirschfeld in May 2005 after nearly being canceled, staying for 297 performances. In 2006, some of the air rights above the Al Hirschfeld were sold to two developers as part of a special zoning provision. (Note: New York City zoning sets a maximum floor area for each land lot, after which developers must buy air rights to increase their floor area. Typically, building owners could only sell air rights to developers who owned adjacent sites. Broadway theater owners are allowed to sell their air rights to developers of any lot between Sixth and Eighth Avenues north of 40th Street, regardless of whether the land lots were contiguous.) The musical The Wedding Singer opened in 2006 and ran for 285 performances, followed in 2007 by Curtains for 511 performances. A musical version of A Tale of Two Cities had a short run in 2008, while the musical Hair opened the next year with 519 performances. In 2009, Roth acquired a 50 percent stake in Jujamcyn and assumed full operation of the firm when Landesman joined the National Endowments of the Arts.

Elf the Musical opened at the Al Hirschfeld in late 2010 for a limited run, followed in 2011 by a revival of How to Succeed in Business Without Really Trying. Next, the play Fela! had a limited revival at the Al Hirschfeld in July 2012, and Elf the Musical was revived again that November. The musical Kinky Boots opened at the theater in April 2013, ultimately running for 2,507 performances over six years. The next show to occupy the Al Hirschfeld was the musical Moulin Rouge!, which opened in 2019. Moulin Rouge! achieved the box office record for the Al Hirschfeld Theatre, grossing $2,716,892 over nine performances for the week ending December 29, 2019. The theater closed on March 12, 2020, due to the COVID-19 pandemic. It reopened on September 24, 2021, with Moulin Rouge! returning. Jujamcyn and Ambassador Theatre Group (ATG) agreed to merge in early 2023; the combined company would operate seven Broadway theaters, including the Al Hirschfeld. In July 2023, Jordan Roth sold a 93 percent stake in Jujamcyn's five theaters, including the Al Hirschfeld Theatre, to ATG and Providence Equity. Moulin Rouge! closed in August 2026, after 2,297 performances. Now You See Me Live opened at the theater in November 2026 and is scheduled to run until January 2027. This will be followed by Paddington: The Musical, which is scheduled to open in April 2027.

== Notable productions ==
Productions are listed by the year of their first performance.

=== Martin Beck Theatre ===
Notable productions at the theater
Opening year	Name	Refs.
1924	Madame Pompadour	
1925	Captain Jinks	
1926	The Shanghai Gesture	
1927	The Shannons of Broadway	
1928	Night Hostess	
1928	Wings Over Europe	
1929	Dynamo	
1929	Porgy	
1930	The Apple Cart	
1931	The House of Connelly	
1931	Reunion in Vienna	
1933	The Lake	
1934	Yellow Jack	
1934	Gilbert and Sullivan Series (eleven unique productions) (Note: The following plays appeared: The Gondoliers, Cox and Box/The Pirates of Penzance, Iolanthe, H.M.S. Pinafore/Trial by Jury, The Mikado, The Yeomen of the Guard, Ruddigore, Princess Ida, Patience)	
1934	Romeo and Juliet	
1935	The Barretts of Wimpole Street	
1935	Flowers of the Forest	
1935	Winterset	
1935	Romeo and Juliet	
1936	Saint Joan	
1936	Gilbert and Sullivan Series (eleven unique productions) (Note: The following plays appeared: The Mikado, The Pirates of Penzance/Trial by Jury, The Gondoliers, The Yeomen of the Guard, Iolanthe, Cox and Box/H.M.S. Pinafore, Patience, Princess Ida, Ruddigore)	
1937	High Tor	
1937	Barchester Towers	
1938	How to Get Tough About It	
1938	Victoria Regina	
1939	Gilbert and Sullivan Series (eight unique productions) (Note: The following plays appeared: The Pirates of Penzance, Trial by Jury, The Mikado, Iolanthe, Cox and Box, H.M.S. Pinafore, The Gondoliers, The Yeomen of the Guard)	
1939	The Devil and Daniel Webster	
1939	Ladies and Gentlemen	
1940	Cabin in the Sky	
1941	Watch on the Rhine	
1942	The Moon Is Down	
1942	My Sister Eileen	
1943	The Corn Is Green	
1943	A Connecticut Yankee	
1944	Jacobowsky and the Colonel	
1945	On the Town	
1946	Jeb	
1946	St. Louis Woman	
1946	The Iceman Cometh	
1947	Barefoot Boy with Cheek	
1947	The Voice of the Turtle	
1947	Antony and Cleopatra	
1948	You Never Can Tell	
1948	Sally	
1948	Edward, My Son	
1949	Goodbye, My Fancy	
1950	The Curious Savage	
1950	Ring Round the Moon	
1951	The Rose Tattoo	
1952	Mrs. McThing	
1952	The Grass Harp	
1953	The Crucible	
1953	The Teahouse of the August Moon	
1956	Mister Johnson	
1956	Major Barbara	
1956	Candide	
1957	Orpheus Descending	
1958	The Tunnel of Love	
1958	Who Was That Lady I Saw You With?	
1958	Maria Golovin	
1958	Say, Darling	
1959	Les Ballets Africains	
1959	Sweet Bird of Youth	
1960	Bye Bye Birdie	
1961	The Happiest Girl in the World	
1961	Milk and Honey	
1963	Mother Courage and Her Children	
1963	Strange Interlude	
1963	The Ballad of the Sad Café	
1964	Cafe Crown	
1964	The Physicists	
1964	I Had a Ball	
1965	Oliver!	
1965	Drat! The Cat!	
1965	Baker Street	
1965	Marat/Sade	
1966	A Delicate Balance	
1967	Hallelujah, Baby!	
1968	Man of La Mancha	
1975	Habeas Corpus	
1977	Happy End	
1977	Dracula	
1980	Onward Victoria	
1981	Bring Back Birdie	
1981	The Little Foxes	
1981	The First	
1982	Come Back to the Five & Dime, Jimmy Dean, Jimmy Dean	
1983	All's Well That Ends Well	
1984	The Rink	
1985	Take Me Along	
1987	Into the Woods	
1989	Grand Hotel	
1992	Guys and Dolls	
1995	Moon Over Buffalo	
1996	David Copperfield, Dreams and Nightmares	
1997	Annie	
1997	The Cherry Orchard	
1997	Eugene Onegin	
1998	The Sound of Music	
1999	Kiss Me, Kate	
2002	Sweet Smell of Success	
2002	Man of La Mancha	

=== Al Hirschfeld Theatre ===
Notable productions at the theater
Opening year	Name	Refs.
2003	Wonderful Town	
2005	Sweet Charity	
2006	The Wedding Singer	
2007	Curtains	
2008	A Tale of Two Cities	
2009	Hair	
2010	Elf the Musical	
2011	How to Succeed in Business Without Really Trying	
2012	Fela!	
2012	Elf the Musical	
2013	Kinky Boots	
2019	Moulin Rouge!	
2026	Now You See Me Live	
2027	Paddington	

== See also ==
- List of New York City Designated Landmarks in Manhattan from 14th to 59th Streets
- List of Broadway theaters
