= The Tunnel of Love (play) =

Play by Joseph Fields and Peter De Vries

- Original language: English
- Written by: Joseph Fields and Peter De Vries
- Based on: The Tunnel of Love by Peter De Vries
- Subject: Marital infidelity
- Genre: Comedy
- Setting: The home studio of cartoonist Augie Poole, a converted barn in Westport, Connecticut.

Premiere
- Date: February 13, 1957
- Place: Royale Theatre, New York City
- Directed by: Joseph Fields

The Tunnel of Love is a three-act play with five scenes and a prologue, written by Joseph Fields and Peter De Vries, adapted from the latter's 1954 novel. It is a comedy with a simple plot, small cast, and only one setting. The action is concerned with the efforts of a married couple to conceive a child and the complications that set in when they decide to try adoption. The staging by Fields features many entrances and exits from the single set with moderate pacing.

The Theatre Guild produced the play, which was a hit on Broadway, running for 417 performances. Although a box office success, largely due to the star Tom Ewell, it failed to garner any award nominations. When Ewell left after a full year playing the lead, the role was taken over by Johnny Carson for six weeks, in his only Broadway stage appearance. The play also ran for more than a year in London. Popular with regional and community theaters during 1957 through 1959, its thin plot seems to have precluded much interest in revivals during subsequent years.

== Characters ==
Leads

- Augie Poole is a cartoonist with good ideas but unsalable drawings. However, he refuses to be a "gagman" and sell just his ideas.
- Isolde Poole is a former actress, and Augie's wife of five years. Her grandmother is their financial support. She and Augie want to have a child.
- Dick Pepper: is an editor for The Townsman magazine, who keeps rejecting Augie's drawings but wants to buy his ideas. He is a serial philanderer.
- Alice Pepper, is Dick's wife, mother of their three children with another on the way. She is sometimes frank in speech but is blind to Dick's cheating.

Supporting

- Estelle Novick is a Polish-born D.Sc. candidate at La Sorbonne, currently studying at Columbia while working for Rock-a-bye Adoption Agency.
- Miss McCracken is another case worker with Rock-a-bye Adoption Agency.

Voice only

- Miss Watkins is the receptionist from Dr. Vancouver's office, heard on speaker phone in Augie's studio.
- Desk Clerk is from the Westport Arms Hotel, heard on speaker phone in Augie's studio.
- Dr. Vancouver is the doctor trying to help Isolde Poole conceive, and later has an adoption prospect. Heard on speaker phone in Augie's studio.
- Augie Jr is not seen, just heard as baby noises from bassinet in the studio.

== Synopsis ==
=== Act One, Scene 1 ===
The play opens in Augie's studio with a brief prologue, in which Isolde is furious with Augie over some unknown transgression. She is also unhappy about living in a bedroom community, and wants to return to Manhattan. Alice and Dick Pepper offer unwanted support. Isolde storms out, followed shortly by the Peppers. Augie delivers a self-pitying speech to the empty set, trying to explain to the absent Isolde just how this all started a year ago... (Blackout)

An afternoon in June. Alice and Dick bring champagne to Augie's studio for the Poole's 5th anniversary. Augie returns from Manhattan, having failed to sell cartoons to The New Yorker. He calls Dr. Vancouver's office trying to find Isolde. Dick admires Augie's latest cartoon idea, but not the drawing. He tries to get Augie to sell his ideas, but Augie dislikes being a "gagman". He asks the Peppers to leave and Alice does, but Dick stays behind. Dick phones the Westport Arms and makes a date with Terry McBain, a young libretist he knows. Augie and Dick argue about Dick's playing around. Isolde returns from shopping in the city. Alice comes back to congratulate Isolde on the anniversary. Isolde announces they are going to apply for adoption at the Rock-a-bye agency, using the Peppers as references. Dick is alarmed at being checked on by a case worker and decides to cancel his date. Alice and Isolde return from the bedroom, and the Peppers leave the studio. Isolde and Augie argue about the precise timing of lovemaking that Dr Vancouver's fertility program requires. Augie pleads for natural methods. Isolde pouts but changes into an enticing outfit. They reconcile, and Augie mentions giving up drawing and just selling his ideas. Isolde forbids it, and the couple embraces. (Curtain)

=== Act One, Scene 2 ===
The next day. Augie is in his studio battling a mouse. Dick comes in, and Augie chides him again for playing around. Dick leaves in a huff then Isolde comes in. Isolde reveals she is aware of Dick's philandering. She expresses relief that Augie is "normal", upsetting Augie who feels he has neuroses like other artists. He goes to take a shower; Alice rushes in to say Estelle Novick, the investigator from Rock-a-bye has just interviewed her. Alice hides bottles from the bar and the two women rush into the bedroom. Augie emerges from the bathroom, sans pants, furiously trying to hit a mouse with his slipper. Noticing the empty bar counter, he finds a hidden Scotch bottle and picks it up. Hearing the doorbell, he wraps a towel around him and answers it, still holding the bottle.

It is the caseworker, Estelle Novick, but Augie doesn't recognize the name. His partially-clothed state and the bottle in his hand make a poor impression on her, as does his reference, Dick Pepper, who comes back in and immediately suggests a get together. Miss Novick reveals she is from Rock-a-bye. Both men plead with her as she starts to leave. Isolde and Alice return to the studio, and greet Miss Novick. They are surprised at her quick departure and interrogate their spouses. Isolde is furious with Augie; she and Alice leave for the Pepper's house. Dick explains to Augie the complicated balance between his cheating and his guilt feelings. He suggests Augie's inhibitions are preventing Isolde from conceiving and recommends his friend have an affair himself to "loosen up". Augie throws hims out then tries to call Isolde at the Pepper's. Alice and Isolde's' voices are heard through the speaker phone. Isolde rejects his suggestion that the two of them go out alone and hangs up.

There is a knock on the front door; Estelle Novick has returned on a personal visit. Her dissertation is on sexual mores of New England, and she has decided Augie would make a good test subject. They share a few double scotch drinks; Augie is delighted when she picks up one of his drawings and laughs. They embrace and kiss. (Curtain)

=== Act Two, Scene 1 ===
Three months later (Late September). On a Sunday morning, Isolde and Augie read the papers. Isolde wonders why they haven't heard from any of the adoption agencies to which they applied. After she leaves, Dick comes in, having been summoned by Augie. Augie confesses to having had a single encounter with Miss Novick three months back, from which she has become pregnant. He tells Dick he'll sign the "ideas" only contract with The Townsman for a $1000 advance. Dick reluctantly agrees and writes the check which Augie takes. Alice and Isolde come into the studio. Augie leaves to meet Miss Novick, however they have missed connections and she turns up at the studio. Dick is alarmed, but the two wives are delighted. Miss Novick assures them a baby may become available in six months, but doesn't reveal her own condition or Augie's slip. Augie returns to the studio, and is under great stress finding Miss Novick there. She asks to speak with Augie privately so the others leave. Augie gives her the check and she assures him they won't meet again, as she will leave for New Zealand after the birth. Miss Novick then tells him a folk-saying from Poland, without translating (Note: Los pisze prosto krzyvymi liniami or "Fate writes straight with crooked lines".) then leaves. (Curtain)

=== Act Two, Scene 2 ===
Six months later (March). Isolde confronts Augie and Dick separately about a tax slip from The Townsman that shows Augie earned a $1000 more than expected. They offer conflicting explanations which Isolde plainly doesn't believe. Isolde tells Augie and Dick about an adoption prospect mentioned by Dr. Vancouver. After she leaves however, Augie reveals himself obsessed with adopting his own child. Alice, having had delivered the Pepper's latest baby sometime ago, fetches Dick back home to help care for it. Isolde returns to a tender scene with Augie, where he admires her understanding and forgiveness. Dick has slipped away from Alice again and returned to the studio. Isolde leaves him alone with Augie. Augie phones Dr. Vancouver, who is heard over the speaker phone saying the adoption prospect he knew of is no longer available. Miss McCracken knocks at the door. After meeting Augie and Dick, the former fetches Isolde, and Alice wanders in as well. All four of them sit and listen as Miss McCracken announces the Pooles have been selected to receive a baby boy. She says the mother is a doctoral candidate and the father a weak figure married to someone else. The act ends as both couples exit with Miss McCracken to pick up the infant. (Curtain)

=== Act Three ===
One month later (April). The two couples are in the studio, where a bassinet now resides. Isolde hold up a baby photo and asks everyone what they think of it. Told it is a good likeness of Augie Jr, Isolde announces its actually an old baby photo of Augie Sr, sent by his mother through the mail. Isolde confronts Augie, accusing him of being the father of the baby. Abashed, Augie can only hold his hands out in supplication. Isolde will have none of it, and we see the four characters assuming their starting positions from Act One, Scene 1 and the dialogue is repeated up to the point where Isolde leaves the studio. (Blackout)

When the lights come up, Augie is alone. Miss McCracken appears at the door, to remind Augie that the Poole's are on probation and will be checked on regularly for a year. She leaves and Isolde comes in, determined to leave. She insists she'll bicycle away and leaves; off stage a crashing noise is heard. Augie rushes out and returns carrying Isolde, who has a sprained ankle. They argue about calling a doctor, while Augie fetches a first-aid kit. While he tapes the ankle he expounds his devotion to her. She tries to push him away, but injury and reluctance for throwing away six years of marriage causes her to reconsider. They reconcile; when Isolde suddenly asks Augie to run out and buy some Chinese food, he realises she must be pregnant. Augie declares they will move back to Manhattan to raise their children. They embrace and play ends.

== Changes from novel ==
The play condenses the number of characters, action, settings, and timeline. The literary asides and wordplay of the book are abandoned in favor of situational comedy and a few double-entendres. Augie Poole was a serial cheater in the novel, while Dick was very much involved with his kids; the play reverses these traits. Augie Poole is the central character of the play, where Dick was in the novel.

== Original production ==
=== Background ===
De Vries wrote his own script for a stage version of his novel in 1955, which the Theatre Guild was reported to be considering for production in 1956. However, Joseph Fields was largely responsible for the play that was produced. His rewrite was likely predicated on knowing Tom Ewell would be the star, and so turned Augie Poole into a pastiche of Richard Sherman from The Seven Year Itch. The converted barn set was designed and lit by Ralph Alswang, while costumes were by Virginia Volland.

=== Cast ===
The "Dick Pepper" role was originally cast with Scott McKay. However, during rehearsals it was decided he was too youthful-looking for the part, so Darren McGavin was brought in just before the first tryout to replace him. The cast then remained the same throughout all three tryout cities and the Broadway premiere. However, as the Broadway run lengthened, replacements began to occur, as shown below.

Cast during tryouts in New Haven, Boston, Philadelphia and the original Broadway run
Role	Actor	Dates	Notes
Augie Poole	Tom Ewell	Jan 09, 1957 - Jan 09, 1958	Ewell was given sole top billing in a part clearly written for him.
Augie Poole	Johnny Carson	Jan 10, 1958 - Feb 23, 1958	This was his only Broadway stage performance. He continued doing Do You Trust Your Wife during the run.
Augie Poole	Larry Parks	Feb 22, 1958 - Feb 23, 1958	Parks did the last four performances on Broadway then led the national touring company.
Isolde Poole	Nancy Olson	Jan 09, 1957 - Jul 06, 1957	
Isolde Poole	Kaye Lyder	Jul 08, 1957 - Jan 09, 1958	Lyder had previously featured with Tom Ewell in The Seven Year Itch.
Isolde Poole	Marsha Hunt	Jan 10, 1958 - Feb 23, 1958	Hunt had played the same role in a Miami company. She received equal billing with Johnny Carson.
Dick Pepper	Darren McGavin	Jan 09, 1957 - Sep 10, 1957	
Dick Pepper	Jordan Bentley	Sep 11, 1957 - Feb 23, 1958	Bentley had previously appeared in The Pajama Game on Broadway.
Alice Pepper	Elisabeth Fraser	Jan 09, 1957 - Jul 27, 1957	
Alice Pepper	Louise Kirtland	Jul 29, 1957 - Oct 12, 1957	
Alice Pepper	Hildy Parks	Oct 14, 1957 - Feb 23, 1958	
Estelle Novick	Sylvia Daneel	Jan 09, 1957 - Aug 31, 1957	
Estelle Novick	Greta Markson	Sep 02, 1957 - Feb 23, 1958	
Miss McCracken	Elizabeth Wilson	Jan 09, 1957 - Oct 19, 1957	
Miss McCracken	Janet Fox	Oct 21, 1957 - Feb 23, 1958	

=== Tryouts ===
The Tunnel of Love had its first tryout at the Shubert Theatre in New Haven, Connecticut on January 9, 1957. There was special interest in this play for local audiences, since the setting was the nearby community of Westport, the home of co-author Peter De Vries. The local reviewer reported that the audience loved the play, and praised the cast and staging. However, the reviewer disliked the double-takes and double-entendres Fields inserted into the play: "It's humors are a cotton substitute for the brilliant whimsey and urbanity which Mr. De Vries put into his original novel". The reviewer also noted that star Tom Ewell was playing the same character he had portrayed in The Seven Year Itch. An out of town reviewer reported the audience laughed non-stop at the dialogue, which troubled Theresa Helburn of the Theatre Guild. "That's the trouble... It's half an hour too long" she explained. After the third performance Nancy Olson slipped on an icy sidewalk in New Haven, spraining her ankle, so her understudy took the role for the final two performances.

The company then went to Boston for two weeks, opening at the Colonial Theatre on January 14, 1957. The reviewer considered Tom Ewell's performance as central to the play's success, while also praising Darren McGavin and Nancy Olson. Calling it "completely joyous entertainment", she also suggested cutting some excess dialogue and speeding the pace up at a few points. Tom Ewell confirmed that cuts were happening almost every performance to tighten up the pacing.

The production went to Philadelphia next, opening at the Walnut Theatre on January 28, 1957, as part of the Theatre Guild local subscription series. The critical and audience response were very good, and there were no cast or script changes during the engagement. Newspapers reported that all seats for the two week run in Philadelphia had been sold by the third day.

=== Premiere ===
Upon receipt of the good reviews from Philadelphia, the Theatre Guild allowed ticket sales for the Broadway run to begin January 30, 1957. By February 11, 1957, two days before the premiere, they reported $550,000 in advance sales. The Broadway premiere was at the Royale Theatre on February 13, 1957, allowing advertising to emphasize the proximity of Valentine's Day.

=== Reception ===
Critical opinions, while acknowledging its mass appeal, were slighting of the play's content. Brooks Atkinson of The New York Times was severe: "The 'Tunnel of Love' is a one-gag job.... After the first act had slipped by agreeably, this department thought it was looking at a piece of hackwork". He was more generous with the acting and direction. John Chapman centered his praise around Tom Ewell's portrayal of "innocent misery", while urging a faster pace in the middle act. Martin Dickstein also felt Ewell's performance was "most of the fun", "even though all of the laughs revolve around the same little joke from beginning to end". Columnist Danton Walker was especially disparaging of "the Theatre Guild's little whatsit" which treated its subject "with the delicacy of a pile driver".

=== Changes of venue and closing ===
The production suspended performances for two weeks on December 14, 1957. It resumed the day after Christmas at the National Theatre. The last performance at the National Theatre was February 2, 1958; the play resumed at the Martin Beck Theater on February 4, 1958, where it closed on February 23, 1958, after 417 performances. According to Ed Sullivan in his syndicated newspaper column, the production had grossed $1,110,000 of which $147,000 was profit.

== U.S. national tour ==
The Theatre Guild kicked off the national tour immediately after the Broadway closing, opening at the Shubert Theatre in Detroit on February 26, 1958. Only Parks and Hunt from the Broadway run joined the tour, leading a reviewer to lament "a first road company performance in which the lines were read with too much care". The cast also included Gerald Metcalfe as Dick, Anna Minot as Alice, Margaret O'Neill as Estelle and Carolyn Brenner as Miss McCracken.

== West End production ==
It was reported in October 1957 that the London rights to the play had been sold to Robin Fox, Robert Morley, and S. A. Gorlinsky, and an opening was scheduled for December 9. The play was staged at Her Majesty's Theatre in the West End of London, beginning in December 1957. Despite mixed notices, the production ran for more than a year.

== Adaptations ==
=== Film ===
MGM acquired the movie rights in a conditional agreement during January 1957. One of the terms was that the movie version would not be started until after the Broadway stage run had ended. This was a misjudgement on the part of MGM; by the time the film was released in November 1958, the country had been saturated with community and regional stage productions of the play. Two of the original Broadway cast, Fraser and Wilson, reprised their roles for the film.
