= Serge Walter =

American composer-songwriter (1896–1976)

Serge Walter (July 5, 1896 – October 8, 1976) was a Russian-born American composer and songwriter. He wrote songs for Broadway revues and musicals during the 1920s and 1930s. He worked as a songwriter for Hollywood films during the 1940s.

== Biography ==
Serge Walter was born on July 5, 1896, in Hungerburg, Russian Empire. He was educated at private schools in Saint Petersburg. He fled Russia in 1917 due to the Russian Revolution. He initially settled in Finland but then went to Paris where he became a member of SACEM in 1921. He became a naturalized American citizen in 1925. In the late 1920s he wrote music for The Greenwich Village Follies.

Walter collaborated with Agnes Morgan on writing the song "Command to Love" for the 1928 version of the Broadway revue Grand Street Follies which was staged at the Booth Theatre . For the 1929 version of this revue he wrote the music for several songs created in collaboration with lyricists Max and Nathaniel Lief. With Charles Kenny as his lyricist, Walter wrote the music to the songs "Back Seat of a Taxi", "Blind Alleys", "Park Ave.", "That's You", "Goona'Goona", "Bonbonera", "Tu Sais", and "Love, Where Are You Now?" for the Broadway musical Belmont Varieties (1932).

Walter composed music for the 1932 version of The Passing Show which was produced by the Shubert family for runs at theaters in Detroit and Cincinnati, but never made it to Broadway. He wrote both words and music to the song "Everything But My Man" which was interpolated into the Broadway musical Shady Lady (1933). In 1942 he became a member of the American Society of Composers, Authors and Publishers, and that same year began a career writing music for Hollywood films. With lyricist Jack Scholl he wrote the song "Gay Parisienne" for The Desert Song (1943). He also contributed songs to the films The Gay Senorita (1945) and Rogues' Regiment (1948).

Walter died on October 8, 1976, in Palm Beach, Florida.
