= Wings Over Europe (play) =

1928 Broadway three-act play written by Robert Nichols and Maurice Browne

- Original language: English
- Written by: Robert Nichols and Maurice Browne
- Genre: drama
- Setting: 10 Downing Street, London

Premiere
- Date: December 10, 1928
- Place: Martin Beck Theatre, New York City, New York

Wings Over Europe was a 1928 Broadway three-act play written by Robert Nichols and Maurice Browne, produced by the Theatre Guild and directed by Rouben Mamoulian. It opened on December 10, 1928 at the Martin Beck Theatre and then moved to the Alvin Theatre on February 6, 1929, running for 90 total performances.

Young British genius Francis Lightfoot has discovered how to make terrible bombs using the atom. He's soon dismayed by the greed and militarism of the British cabinet members.

== Cast ==
- Hugh Buckler as Stapp
- Frank Conroy as Arthur
- Wheeler Dryden as Plimsoll
- Frank Elliott as Dedham
- Joseph Kilgour as Grindle
- Alexander Kirkland as Lightfoot
- Robert Rendel as Vere
- Lionel Bevans as St. Man
- Thomas Braidon as Cossington
- Charles Carden as Taggert
- John Dunn as Sunningdale
- Charles Francis as Faulkiner
- George Graham as Pascoe
- Nicholas Joy as Haliburton
- A. P. Kaye as Rummel
- Ernest Lawford as Grantby
- Edward Lester as Hand
- Gordon Richards as Dunn
- Grant Stewart as Blount

== Accolades ==
Wings Over Europe was included in Burns Mantle's The Best Plays of 1928–29.
