= Peter De Vries =

American editor and novelist

- Born: Peter De Vries; February 27, 1910; Chicago, Illinois, US
- Died: September 28, 1993 (aged 83); Norwalk, Connecticut, US
- Occupations: Novelist; satirist; magazine editor
- Spouse: Katinka Loeser (died 1991)
- Children: 4
- Writing career
- Notable works: The Tunnel of Love (1954); The Blood of the Lamb (1961)
- Notable awards: American Academy of Arts and Letters (1983)

Peter De Vries (February 27, 1910 – September 28, 1993) was an American editor and novelist known for his satiric wit.

== Biography ==
De Vries was born in Chicago, Illinois, in 1910. He was educated in Dutch Christian Reformed Church schools, graduating from Calvin College in Grand Rapids, Michigan, in 1931. He also studied at Northwestern University. He supported himself with a number of different jobs, including those of vending machine operator, toffee-apple salesman, radio actor in the 1930s, and editor for Poetry magazine from 1938 to 1944.

He joined the staff of The New Yorker magazine at the insistence of James Thurber and worked there from 1944 to 1987, writing stories and touching up cartoon captions. A prolific writer, De Vries wrote short stories, reviews, poetry, essays, a play, novellas, and twenty-five novels. Films made from De Vries's novels include The Tunnel of Love (1958), which also was a successful Broadway play; How Do I Love Thee? (1970, based on Let Me Count the Ways); Pete 'n' Tillie (1972, based on Witch’s Milk); and Reuben, Reuben (1983), which also inspired a Broadway play, Spofford. Earlier, in 1952, De Vries also contributed to the writing of the Broadway revue New Faces of 1952. Although he enjoyed success for five decades, all his novels were out of print by the time of his death.

James Bratt describes De Vries as "a secular Jeremiah, a renegade CRC missionary to the smart set."

== Personal life ==
Peter De Vries met his future wife, poet and author Katinka Loeser, in 1943 when she won an award from Poetry magazine. The couple moved to Westport, Connecticut, in 1948. They were the parents of four children: sons Derek and Jon, daughters Jan and Emily. Emily died in 1960 at age ten after a two-year fight with leukemia. This experience provided the inspiration for his 1961 work, The Blood of the Lamb. His son Jon is an actor who has appeared in movies such as American Gangster; Sarah, Plain and Tall; and Skylark; as well as episodic television in shows like Blue Bloods, Boardwalk Empire, and Star Trek: The Next Generation. His daughter Jan, an author, editor and psychic counselor whose interests and activities ranged from homeopathic medicine to shamanism, the occult and Native American lore, died in 1997 at age 52, of cancer.

Katinka De Vries died in 1991. Peter De Vries died at age 83 on September 28, 1993, in a Norwalk, Connecticut, hospital. He, his wife, and daughter are buried in Willowbrook Cemetery, Westport, Connecticut.

== Honors ==
De Vries received an honorary degree in 1979 from Susquehanna University. He was elected to the American Academy of Arts and Letters in May 1983.

== Works ==
- But Who Wakes the Bugler? (1940)
- The Handsome Heart (1943)
- Angels Can't Do Better (1944)
- No But I Saw the Movie (1952)
- The Tunnel of Love (1954)
- Comfort Me with Apples (1956)
- The Mackerel Plaza (1958)
- The Tents of Wickedness (1959)
- Through the Fields of Clover (1961)
- The Blood of the Lamb (1961)
- Reuben, Reuben (1964)
- Let Me Count the Ways (1965)
- The Vale of Laughter (1967)
- The Cat's Pajamas & Witch's Milk (1968)
- Mrs. Wallop (1970)
- Into Your Tent I'll Creep (1971)
- Without a Stitch in Time (1972)
- Forever Panting (1973)
- The Glory of the Hummingbird (1974)
- I Hear America Swinging (1976)
- Madder Music (1977)
- Consenting Adults; or, The Duchess Will Be Furious (1980)
- Sauce for the Goose (1981)
- Slouching Towards Kalamazoo (1983)
- The Prick of Noon (1985)
- Peckham's Marbles (1986)

=== Short stories and humorous pieces ===
- De Vries, Peter (1 January 1949). "Open House". The New Yorker. Vol. 24, no. 45. pp. 40–43. Short story.
- De Vries, Peter (4 February 1950). "Jam Today". The New Yorker. Vol. 25, no. 50. pp. 34–35. Humorous piece about jazz snobs.
- De Vries, Peter (8 April 1950). "Intruder In The Dusk". The New Yorker. Vol. 25, no. 66. pp. 37–38. Short story in the style of William Faulkner.
