= The Tunnel of Love =

1958 film by Gene Kelly

The Tunnel of love
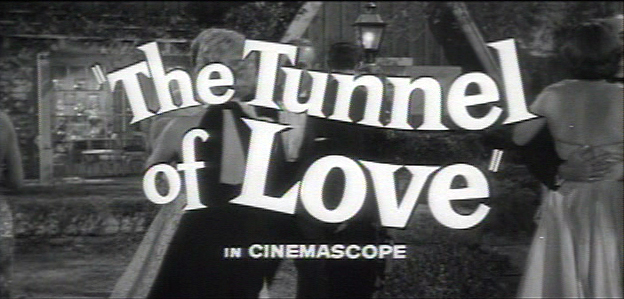
- Title card from the trailer
- Directed by: Gene Kelly
- Screenplay by: Joseph Fields
- Based on: The Tunnel of Love; 1954 novel by Peter De Vries
- Produced by: Joseph Fields; Martin Melcher
- Starring: Doris Day; Richard Widmark; Gig Young; Gia Scala; Elisabeth Fraser; Elizabeth Wilson
- Cinematography: Robert J. Bronner
- Edited by: John McSweeney
- Distributed by: Metro-Goldwyn-Mayer
- Release date: November 21, 1958
- Running time: 98 minutes
- Country: United States
- Language: English
- Budget: $2,017,000
- Box office: $2,690,000

The Tunnel of Love is a 1958 American romantic comedy film directed by Gene Kelly and starring Doris Day and Richard Widmark. The film follows a married suburban couple who want a child but are unable to conceive. After adopting a child, they find the baby looks suspiciously like the adoptive father (Widmark). It is based on the 1957 hit Broadway play by Peter De Vries and Joseph Fields, which in turn was based on De Vries' 1954 novel. The Tunnel of Love is the first film directed by Kelly in which he did not also appear. Day received a nomination for the Golden Globe Award for Best Actress – Motion Picture Musical or Comedy for her performance.

The film was a box office disappointment, which Kelly attributed to audiences not willing to accept Widmark in a comedic role. Widmark had already established himself as a dramatic lead, and comedic actor Glenn Ford had been the original choice.

== Plot ==
In Westport, Connecticut, Augie and Isolde Poole celebrate their fifth wedding anniversary by turning in an application to the Rock-a-Bye adoption agency. Encouraged by their friends and next-door neighbors, Dick and Alice Pepper, who have three children and another due, Isolde, who has been unsuccessful in her attempts to become pregnant, is determined that she and Augie will eventually be parents. While awaiting news of the application to the agency, Isolde decides that she and Augie should continue to try to have a baby on their own, and she enthusiastically follows all the latest advice by pregnancy experts.

Although exhausted by Isolde's resolve, Augie worries about having a child while they are living off Isolde's family money as he struggles to make a success as a serious cartoonist. Dick, editor of The Townsman magazine, assures Augie that his publication would gladly hire Augie to write gags, but Isolde insists that Augie hold out for a more important offer. Dick criticizes Augie for being too serious, compared to his own lighthearted manner, which, to Augie's dismay, includes perpetual infidelity.

One afternoon some weeks after their application, Estelle Novick (Gia Scala), a striking young investigator from Rock-a-Bye, visits the Pooles' neighborhood. Having learned of Estelle's presence from other neighbors, Alice takes Isolde home to dress her properly for the interview. When Estelle comes to the Pooles' house, Augie is unaware of her identity and, believing she works for a local charity, drinks two cocktails and behaves casually.

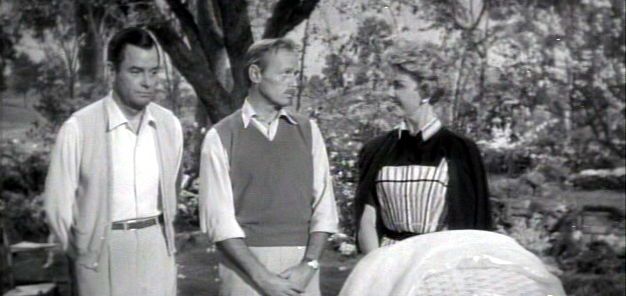
Doris Day, Richard Widmark and Gig Young

When Dick comes over and makes a pass at Estelle, however, she is outraged and reveals her identity. Reminding the men that Dick is the Pooles' reference, Estelle waves aside their abject apologies and insists that she must report her findings to the agency. When Estelle departs as soon as Isolde returns, Isolde is hurt and angry at Augie and goes home with Alice. Dick tries to comfort Augie by suggesting that Augie might relax if he had an affair, but when Augie scoffs, Dick offers him tranquilizers and leaves. Moments later, Estelle returns to the Pooles', apologizes for her severe behavior and accepts the cocktail Augie offered her earlier. Considering Dick's advice and dispirited by Isolde's anger, Augie is emboldened to ask Estelle to dinner. While driving into town, however, Augie panics and takes one of Dick's tranquilizers.

Later, when Augie becomes drowsy, Estelle drives him to a motel and checks him into a room to let him sleep off the pill's effect. The next morning, Augie is mortified to find himself in the motel and, finding a note from Estelle thanking him for his kindness, believes he has been unfaithful to Isolde. Three months later, Isolde is disheartened to have heard nothing from Rock-a-Bye or any of the other adoption agencies. Augie visits Dick and confesses the incident with Estelle, from whom he has just received a call informing him that she is pregnant and leaving the area for her confinement. Fearful that she will demand money, Augie pleads with Dick to hire him at the magazine, then give him a thousand dollar advance.

Later that day, Estelle drops by to visit the Pooles to advise them that she believes in a few months they may at last get their baby. Isolde is delighted by the news and Augie weakly announces his new job with Dick's magazine. Alone with Estelle later, Augie presses the money on her, then demands an explanation. Estelle promises to repay the loan, then explains that she owes the Pooles for all of Augie's assistance to her.

A few months later, Dick and Alice throw Augie and Isolde a party in anticipation of the arrival of the new baby. While dancing with Dick, Isolde confides that she has found a mysterious thousand dollar imbalance in the Pooles' finances. Realizing this must be the money Augie has given Estelle, Dick invents a story of losing an investment on the stock market and Augie giving him a loan. Surprised but pleased, Isolde asks for the money to be repaid for preparations for the baby.

That night, Isolde tells Augie about the bank imbalance and, panicked, Augie hastily admits that he borrowed money from Dick several times and paid it back in full once he was employed. Certain that Augie is covering for Dick, the next day Isolde tells Alice, who promises to repay the money. Some weeks later, Miss MacCracken from Rock-a-Bye telephones to schedule a visit. Unnerved, Augie wonders if he should confess everything to Isolde. Miss MacCracken arrives and informs Isolde and Augie that a baby has just been born and they have been moved to the top of the agency's list.

Thrilled, Augie and Isolde welcome the infant baby boy to their home days later, and soon everyone notices the baby's similarity to Augie. Weeks afterward, as the physical similarity grows, Isolde becomes suspicious. When Isolde has Augie's baby picture blown up and Alice mistakes it for the baby, Isolde furiously accuses Augie of infidelity and declares she is leaving him.

As Isolde is packing, Miss MacCracken returns to make an inspection of the couples' first month with the baby. Realizing that the couple is breaking up, she declares she must make a report to the agency, but Augie pleads for a week and Miss MacCracken agrees. Desperate to stop Isolde from leaving, Augie then confesses the incident with Estelle. Just then, however, Estelle arrives to congratulate the Pooles, repay Augie the loan and share a photo of the baby, a girl, which she had with her husband. This confirms to Isolde's satisfaction that Augie and Estelle did not conceive together. The similarity of the baby to Augie is coincidental, Isolde believes, and what really happened to Augie and Estelle that night, and why the baby looks like Augie, is left unexamined.

== Cast ==
- Doris Day as Isolde Poole
- Richard Widmark as Augie Poole
- Gig Young as Dick Pepper
- Gia Scala as Estelle Novick
- Elisabeth Fraser as Alice Pepper
- Elizabeth Wilson as Miss MacCracken
- Vikki Dougan as Gladys Dunne
- Charles Wagenheim as Day Motel Man
- Doodles Weaver as Escort
- Robert Williams as Night Motel Man
- The Esquire Trio as Themselves

The Broadway production of the play starred Tom Ewell, Nancy Olson and Darren McGavin. Glenn Ford was originally slated to appear opposite Day but later dropped out of the production because of commitments to two other projects.

== Problematic circumstances ==
Kelly's pinnacle years at MGM came to a close with this film, which was the final one in his contract. He had been looking for more opportunities to direct and new MGM chief (and Kelly fan) Benny Thau needed someone to tackle the film, so it was a beneficial collaboration for both of them. But there were conditions. Thau stipulated that Kelly had to make the movie in black and white, using only one primary set, shoot it in just three weeks and for a cost of less than $500,000. (Notably, this was Day's final B&W film.)

Kelly succeeded, completing the film on time and within the budget. Yet, it did not perform well at the box office, for reasons which Kelly later revealed in The Films of Gene Kelly: Song and Dance Man: "This is no criticism of Richard Widmark, who is one of the finest film actors we have and who actually started his stage career playing light comedic parts. It's simply that the public fixes an impression of an actor, they accept him in a certain guise and they don't like him to stray too far from it. Widmark had established himself in serious material and they weren't prepared to accept him in this light, sexy part. The public creates type-casting, not the actors - unfortunately." Kelly would go on to direct several other films, most notably the romantic comedy musical film Hello, Dolly! (1969) starring Barbra Streisand, which was nominated for the Academy Award for Best Picture.

== Production ==
The only major change made by Fields in his screenplay adaptation was an explanation that "Augie Poole" is not the father of "Estelle's" child. In the play, Estelle seduces Augie intentionally in order to get pregnant so that she might experience firsthand the plight of unwed mothers, the topic of her PhD thesis, which, as in the film, she reveals she is working on part-time.

Strangely enough, the movie includes a puzzling scene between Richard Widmark and Gia Scala (Miss Novick) during their drive to a restaurant. Miss Scala snuggles up to Widmark, smiles seductively, and lays her head on his shoulder.

Although this is consistent with her character in the play because she does in fact have sex with Augie Poole, it is not consistent with her "married version" in the movie, who has a baby with her own husband and does not have sex with Widmark.

== Release ==
=== Box office ===
According to MGM records the film earned $1,750,000 in the US and Canada and $940,000 elsewhere resulting in a loss of $701,000.

=== Critical response ===
In a 1958 New York Times review, Bosley Crowther wrote "OH, what they say, those shameless people, in M-G-M's "The Tunnel of Love," a comedy that bores through the shifty sands of wedlock in modern suburbia! Such blunt words as "Kinsey" and "pregnant" and even "aphrodisiac" drop from the lips of the characters in unembarrassed loquacity. And what they are candidly discussing in this new film at the Roxy—well! We blush to have to tell you, but it's philoprogenitiveness.", (love of one's offspring). He also wrote that "all the fuss and bother are spent over one minor gag that wears awfully thin before the finish. It's a "Little Accident," updated just a bit."

=== Home media ===
On April 7, 2009, Turner Entertainment released the film on DVD as part of the Doris Day Spotlight Collection. The five-disc set contains digitally remastered versions of It's a Great Feeling (1949), Tea for Two (1950), Starlift (1951) and April in Paris (1952).

== See also ==
- List of American films of 1958
- 1958 in film
- List of films based on stage plays or musicals
