= Shady Lady (musical) =

Musical in two acts with a book by Estelle Morando

Shady Lady is a musical in two acts with a book by Estelle Morando, music by Sam H. Stept and Jesse Greer and lyrics by Bud Green and Stanley Adams. It premiered on Broadway at the Shubert Theatre on July 5, 1933. It ran for a total of 30 performances; closing on July 29, 1933. The cast included Charles Purcell as Richard Brandt, Helen Kane as Millie Mack, Lester Allen as Al Darcy, Max Hoffman, Jr. as Geoffrey Benson, Louise Kirtland as Peggy Stetson, and Audrey Christie as Francine among others. Critic Burns Mantle stated, "The humor of Shady Lady is of the curbs and the honky-tonks. Common and cheap and course." The song "Everything But My Man" with music and lyrics by Serge Walter was interpolated into the show.
