= Night Hostess =

1928 play

- Original language: English
- Written by: Philip Dunning
- Subject: Nightclub melodrama
- Genre: Dramatic comedy
- Setting: The lounge of the Little Casino, New York City

Premiere
- Date: September 12, 1928
- Place: Martin Beck Theatre
- Directed by: Winchell Smith

Night Hostess is a 1928 play in three acts written by Philip Dunning. Its author called it a Dramatic comedy, but most contemporary reviewers said it was a melodrama. It has a large cast, fast pacing, and one setting. The main storyline concerns a crooked nightclub manager who is robbing customers and cheating the owner, complicated by two murders and a romantic triangle.

Produced by John Golden and staged by Winchell Smith, it starred Norman Foster, Ruth Lyons, Averell Harris, Maurice Freeman, and Gail DeHart. After tryouts in Atlantic City and Minneapolis-St. Paul during July and August, it ran on Broadway from September through December 1928. Night Hostess drew unfavorable comparisons from critics with the author's earlier Broadway.

Katharine Hepburn made her Broadway debut in Night Hostess, playing a bit part as one of the "Other Hostesses". She was billed under her own name (spelled as "Katherine") for the tryout in Minneapolis, but according to IBDb took the stage name of "Katherine Burns" for the Broadway run.

== Characters ==
Lead

- Rags Conway is 23, ex-vaudeville piano player, wears snazzy clothes.
- Buddy Miles is a hostess at Little Casino, young, beautiful, fresh and natural.
- Chris Miller is early 40's, handsome, well-groomed, manager of the Little Casino.
- Ben Fischer is Jewish, middle-aged, left arm paralyzed, owner of the Little Casino.
- Julia Barnes is an ex-chorus girl, still young and pretty but unhappy and worn-out.

Supporting

- Tish is the peephole doorman for the Little Casino.
- Tom Hayes is a detective, married to Julia Barnes.
- Hardware Herman is a thug who works for Chris.
- Hennessy is a hoodlum, employed by Chris to roll chumps.
- Peggy is a snappy chorus girl, a skillful gambler.
- Joe is the bartender and bouncer for Little Casino.

Featured

- Frank Wardell is a regular customer at Little Casino.
- Dot is avid nightclub hostess, anxious to increase her take on chump gaming losses.
- Rita is a nightclub hostess.
- First Chump is a tourist from Chattanooga, taken to the gaming room by Dot.
- Second Chump is also from Chattanooga, also one of Dot's marks.
- Cyril Keane called Duke, is a rival hoodlum to Chris Miller.

Bit players and Walk-ons

- Dr. Andrews, Mr. Allen, Other Hostesses, Musicians, Croupiers, Winners, Losers, and Hoodlums

== Synopsis ==
Chris Miller, manager of the Little Casino nightclub has been cheating the proprietor, Ben Fischer, for some time. Miller's girlfriend Julia, and his henchmen Hardware Herman and Hennessy have been setting up "chumps" for rolling after a big win. Miller is getting interested in hostess Buddy Miles, who also sings for the customers a ditty called Everybody's Buddy. One night a rolling goes wrong, and the chump is murdered, with Julia leaving her cigarette case behind in the apartment. Meanwhile, Ben Fischer has been getting suspicious about the club's income dip when it is busy every night. He sends for Rags Conway, a vaudeville performer, to be his secret informant in the club. Rags and Buddy have had a relationship going, but Miller has gotten Buddy's attention by promising her a part in a Chicago stage show in which he has an interest.

Julia, whose substance abuse has led her to a near breakdown, becomes jealous of Buddy, and threatens to spill about the murder. Miller kills her and stuffs her body in a trunk. Tom Hayes, assigned to investigate the killing, recognizes the cigarette case as belonging to his estranged wife, Julia. He questions Miller about her whereabouts, but gets no satisfaction. Miller, panicking, has some hoodlums shift the trunk with Julia's body several times. This draws the attention of Conway and Hayes, who finally are able to find the trunk. Miller sends for some hoodlums to take out Conway and Hayes, but the doorman Tish won't pass them thru into the club. Pursued by Hayes, Miller meets his literal downfall courtesy of an open elevator shaft.

== Original production ==
=== Background ===
Philip Dunning's 1926 play Broadway had been a success, for which George Abbott received much credit for rewriting and directing. However, Dunning went solo on the writing for Night Hostess. A reporter at the second tryout said Dunning made note of audience reactions to specific lines and adjusted the dialogue.

Producer John Golden managed an empire of touring stage and vaudeville companies. He advertised his productions extensively, and rather than trot out his players for the press, he cultivated journalists by giving personal interviews. He had a long-standing partnership with playwright-director Winchell Smith.

=== Cast ===
The production was on hiatus from July 30 through August 25, 1928, and again from December 17 through December 23, 1928.

Principal cast for the tryouts in Atlantic City, Minneapolis, St. Paul, and during the original Broadway run.
Role	Actor	Dates	Notes and sources
Rags Conway	Ross Alexander	Jul 23, 1928 - Jul 28, 1928	He was just 17 when cast in the first tryout.
Rags Conway	Norman Foster	Aug 26, 1928 - Dec 29, 1928	Foster replaced Alexander when the latter was injured in an auto accident just before the second tryout.
Buddy Miles	Marguerite Churchill	Jul 23, 1928 - Jul 30, 1928	She was just 18 when cast in the first tryout.
Buddy Miles	Ruth Lyons	Aug 26, 1928 - Nov 03, 1928	She left the production to take a lead in Jimmies Women.
Buddy Miles	Kay Carlin	Nov 05, 1928 - Dec 29, 1928	
Chris Miller	Averell Harris	Jul 23, 1928 - Dec 29, 1928	
Ben Fischer	Maurice Freeman	Jul 23, 1928 - Dec 29, 1928	
Julia Barnes	Gail DeHart	Jul 23, 1928 - Dec 29, 1928	
Tish	Porter Hall	Jul 23, 1928 - Dec 29, 1928	
Tom Hayes	Charles Laite	Jul 23, 1928 - Dec 29, 1928	
Hardware Herman	John L. Kearney	Jul 23, 1928 - Dec 29, 1928	
Hennessy	Francis O'Relley	Jul 23, 1928 - Dec 29, 1928	
Peggy	Louise Kirtland	Jul 23, 1928 - Dec 29, 1928	
Joe	Norvell Keedwell	Jul 23, 1928 - Jul 28, 1928	
Joe	Henry Lawrence	Aug 26, 1928 - Dec 29, 1928	
Frank Wardell	Harold Woolf	Jul 23, 1928 - Dec 29, 1928	
Dot	Lilian Lyndon	Jul 23, 1928 - Dec 29, 1928	
Rita	Jane Allyn	Jul 23, 1928 - Dec 29, 1928	
First Chump	J. S. Boatsman	Jul 23, 1928 - Dec 29, 1928	
Second Chump	Chester De Whirst	Jul 23, 1928 - Dec 29, 1928	
Cyril Keane	Graham Velsey	Jul 23, 1928 - Dec 29, 1928	

=== Tryouts ===
The play was first presented at the Apollo Theatre in Atlantic City for a one-week run beginning July 23, 1928. The local reviewer gave the storyline and identified some cast members, but limited their opinions to general praise for the production.

A. G. Bainbridge Jr., who leased the Metropolitan theaters in Minneapolis and St. Paul, struck a deal with John Golden to host the second tryout at his theaters. Bainbridge agreed to pay for the round-trip cost of transporting the company from Atlantic City to Minneapolis, where the play would open at his Metropolitan Theatre on August 26, 1928. After one week there, it would then move to the Metropolitan Theatre in St. Paul, Minnesota for another week-long run.

When the play opened as scheduled, one local reviewer noted that it was either a "sequel" or "twin" to Broadway: "The resemblance between Broadway and Night Hostess is striking. Nearly every element in the former show has a counterpart in the second". This same reviewer praised Averell Harris as the villain, and Norman Foster as "the juvenile lead", (Note: The term "juvenile" in this context is not disparaging nor does it indicate a child, but rather at that time it was a type of male role, as an ingénue is a type of female role.) but thought "a stronger feminine lead" would help.

Merle Posner wrote in his review that the theatre for the unusual Sunday opening night was "only partially filled", but the audience gave an "enthusiastic reception" to the play. He also reported that author Dunning was making notes throughout the performance, and that Ruth Lyons as Buddy Miles would be more convincing with less refinement.

=== Premiere and reception ===
Night Hostess had its Broadway premiere on September 12, 1928, at the Martin Beck Theatre. Brooks Atkinson of The New York Times, who subtitled his review 'Foiling the Palukas', (Note: A term more commonly spelled as 'palooka'.) labelled Night Hostess as a "farrago", and said "It might well be the end of the Broadway formula in low-life melodrama". He acknowledged the five leads performed their parts creditably, but said "Night Hostess seemed too much like forced and synthetic entertainment".

Arthur Pollock in the Brooklyn Daily Eagle thought the only innovation in the play was to attempt an underworld melodrama without any salacious language, otherwise there was "no originality in either scene or dialogue". Rowland Field in the Brooklyn Times Union said Night Hostess stood the comparison with Broadway well enough. Burns Mantle was clear that Night Hostess might have benefited from the George Abbott touch, but considered it an exciting melodrama that pleased the opening night audience.

=== Change of venue and closing ===
Night Hostess finished at the Martin Beck Theatre on Saturday, December 1, 1928, re-opening on Monday, December 3, 1928, at the Vanderbilt Theatre. It took a one-week hiatus from December 17, re-opening on December 24, 1928, only to close for good on December 29, 1928.
