= Louise Kirtland =

American stage and screen actress (1905–1999)

Louise Kirtland (born Louise Isabel Jelly, August 4, 1905 – January 14, 1999) was an American actress. Born in Lynn, Massachusetts, she began her stage career immediately following her graduation from Lynn English High School in 1924. She made her Broadway debut in 1927 as Gladys Blake in Mae West's The Wicked Age. She had a long career as mainly a stage actress in both plays and musicals which lasted into the 1980s. Her last Broadway appearance was as Mrs. Upson in the 1983 revival of Mame starring Angela Lansbury. She also appeared in a small number of screen roles in television and film.

== Early life and education ==
The daughter of Thomas Edgar Jelly and his wife Hannah Isabelle Jelly (née Dukeson), Louise Jelly was born in Lynn, Massachusetts on August 4, 1905. By the age of seven she was singing solos at St. Luke's Methodist Church, Lynn, and by 1913 she was performing in amateur theatricals in her native city. She received her primary school education at Ingalls School in Lynn where she was a singer at school events. In 1916, at the age of 10, she gave piano solos and performed in dramas at events held at First Christian Church, Lynn. She continued to sing at church events as a teenager.

Kirtland attended Eastern Junior High School (EJHS) where in April 1920 she portrayed the title role in EJHS's production of the operetta Princess Chrysanthemum. She graduated from EJHS the following June. After this she attended Lynn English High School (LEHS) where she performed in LEHS's 1921 production of Gilbert and Sullivan's The Mikado. She also performed in school plays at LEHS in the early 1920s. In 1924 she played Miss Curtis in LEHS's production of Alice Duer Miller and Robert Milton's The Charm School which was staged at the Auditorium Theatre in Lynn. She graduated from LEHS that same year.

While in high school Kirtland studied at the opera school run by Vinello Johnson. The school put on several operas at the Boston Theatre in 1924 with Kirtland participating as a member of the chorus; including Faust, Cavalleria rusticana, and Pagliacci. After graduating from high school she studied drama at a school in Peterboro. She also studied briefly at the University of Rochester where she appeared in several production with the Laboratory of Theater Arts in 1925.

== Career ==
Kirtland made her professional stage debut in October 1924 in a small part at the Boston Theatre. Shortly thereafter she joined the resident company of actors at the Lynn Auditorium; making her debut with this group in The Gold Diggers. With this company she performed in the musical Irene (1925) and the plays Out of the Night and The Old Soak. After touring with the Merkle-Harder Repertory Company she adopted the stage name of Louise Kirtland when she was cast in the play Square Crooks by James P. Judge in 1926. She portrayed the role of Jane Brown in this touring production.

Kirtland made her Broadway debut at Daly's 63rd Street Theatre as Gladys Blake in Mae West's The Wicked Age. She had a long career on the New York stage in both plays and musicals that spanned nearly 60 years. Some of her Broadway credits included Night Hostess (1928, as Peggy), Tell Her the Truth (1932, as Ethel), Melody (1933, as Ninon Revelle), Shady Lady (1933, as Peggy Stetson), The Only Girl (1934, as Jane McMurray), In Heaven and Earth (1936, as Claire Stanton), Along Fifth Avenue (1949), Alive and Kicking (1950), The Tunnel of Love (1957, as Alice Pepper), The Waltz of the Toreadors (1957, Mme. DuPont-Fredaine), Tovarich (1963, as Grace Davis), Gigi (1974, Aunt Alicia), and Mame (1983, Mrs. Upson).

Kirt also worked extensively in American regional theatre, and appeared in several national tours. In 1974 she portrayed Eulalie Mackecknie Shinn in Paper Mill Playhouse's production of The Music Man; a performance which garnered her a nomination for Best Supporting Actress by the New Jersey Drama Critics Association. Her only film role was as Ruby in the Merchant Ivory Productions film Roseland (1977). Her television credits included appearances on Car 54, Where Are You? and Search for Tomorrow.

== Personal life and death ==
Kirtland was married to the radio announcer and Albert Lewis Alexander until his death in 1967. They married in Hampton, New Hampshire on December 14, 1952. She died on January 14, 1999, in Manhattan at the age of 93.
