= Behave Yourself! =

1951 film by George Beck

- Behave Yourself! theatrical poster
- Directed by: George Beck
- Screenplay by: George Beck
- Story by: George Beck; Frank Tarloff
- Produced by: Norman Krasna (producer); Stanley Rubin (associate producer); Jerry Wald (producer)
- Starring: Farley Granger; Shelley Winters; William Demarest
- Cinematography: James Wong Howe
- Edited by: Paul Weatherwax
- Music by: Leigh Harline
- Production company: Wald/Krasna Productions
- Distributed by: RKO Radio Pictures
- Release date: September 19, 1951 (Kansas City)
- Running time: 81 minutes
- Country: United States
- Language: English
- Box office: $1 million

Behave Yourself! is a 1951 American comedy film directed and cowritten by George Beck, starring Farley Granger and Shelley Winters and released by RKO Radio Pictures.

== Plot ==
Mild mannered young CPA Bill Denny forgets about his and his wife Kate's second anniversary until the last minute, when a small dog starts to follow him. After Kate mistakes the dog for her present, mayhem ensues, and Bill is chased by police, smugglers, counterfeiters and murderers while being harassed by his mother-in-law.

Since Archie insists on sleeping in their bed, Bill and Kate's ability to "celebrate" their wedding anniversary is indefinitely postponed. At least three different gangs want the dog back and have placed "lost dog ads" in the newspapers. Every time Bill goes to answer an ad, he finds a dead body on the premises and always manages to leave panicky clues that he was at the crime scene. He is repeatedly hauled to the police station and grilled by homicide chief O'Ryan.

Meek mild "Max The Umbrella" is assigned to 24-hour rain or shine lookout duty at the spot where the dog was supposed to pass by and deliver the message. When Kate happens to walk past the spot with the dog, Max thinks she's "part of the mob" and hands her the goods, 100 thousand dollars in counterfeit money. Once that mistake is discovered, the surviving mobsters converge on the Denny home for a showdown.

They end up shooting each other dead, except for Pinky as Bill tricks him into backing out a high window and knocking himself out.

With the sizeable reward money on many of the gangsters, Bill and Kate can finally buy their own house and get away from the interfering mother-in-law. But Archie remains a permanent part of the family.

== Cast ==
- Farley Granger as William Calhoun 'Bill' Denny
- Shelley Winters as Kate Denny
- William Demarest as Officer O'Ryan
- Francis L. Sullivan as Fat Freddy
- Margalo Gillmore as Mother
- Lon Chaney Jr. as Pinky
- Hans Conried as Gillie the Blade
- Elisha Cook Jr. as Albert Jonas
- Glenn Anders as Pete the Pusher
- Allen Jenkins as Plainclothesman
- Sheldon Leonard as Shortwave Bert
- Marvin Kaplan as Max the Umbrella
- Archie as himself
- Henry Corden as Numi
- Herburt Vigran as Police Desk Sargeant(uncredited)
- Ralph Sanford as Plainclothesman (uncredited)
- Frank Sully as Taxi Driver(uncredited)
- Don Beddoe as Sgt. O'Neill(uncredited)
- Kathleen Freeman as Wife of Pet Shop Owner (uncredited)
- King Donovan as Lingerie Shop Owner (uncredited)

== Production ==
The film was written in four days and was originally intended to be a vehicle for Cary Grant.

== Release ==
The film's world premiere was held at the RKO Missouri theater in Kansas City, Missouri on September 19, 1951. Stars Farley Granger and Shelley Winters visited Kansas City in advance of the premiere for a series of personal appearances.

== Reception ==
In a contemporary review for The New York Times, critic A. H. Weiler wrote: "The effort, to put it bluntly, is only fitfully bright and chucklesome. And. though the principals go at their tasks with a will, the strain of sustaining a thin theme is occasionally too much for the laboring cast. ... Call it a haphazard merry-go-round carrying more than its share of misunderstandings."

Following the film's Kansas City premiere, a review in The Kansas City Star stated: "The Jerry Wald-Norman Krasna production team has engineered a wild and wooly comedy involving gangsters and a young married couple, which, after a somewhat complicated start necessary to lay the groundwork, moves into high gear and largely retains that accelerated pace through the zany finish."

== Soundtrack ==
- "Behave Yourself!" (By Lew Spence and Buddy Ebsen)
