= Elisabeth Fraser =

American actress (1920–2005)

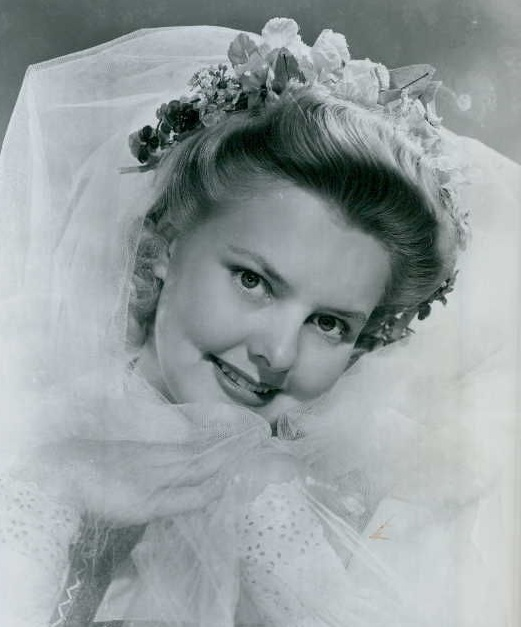
- Born: Elisabeth Fraser Jonker; January 8, 1920; Brooklyn, New York, U.S.
- Died: May 5, 2005 (aged 85); Woodland Hills, Los Angeles, California, U.S.
- Years active: 1941-1980
- Spouse(s): Ray McDonald (1944-1952; divorced); Charles K. Peck Jr. (19??-19??; divorced)
- Children: 3

Elisabeth Fraser (born Elisabeth Fraser Jonker, January 8, 1920 – May 5, 2005) was an American actress, best known for playing brassy blondes.

== Life and career ==
Born Elisabeth Fraser Jonker on January 8, 1920 in Brooklyn, New York, she was educated in Haiti, France and New York.

Fraser began her acting career six weeks after graduating from high school; she was cast as the ingenue in the Broadway production of There Shall Be No Night, which won the Pulitzer Prize for the 1940-1941 season. Fraser obtained a contract with Warner Brothers studios. She appeared in dozens of films.

One of her early roles was in The Man Who Came to Dinner as June Stanley, the young daughter of the Ohio couple forced to put up with Monty Woolley, who tells her to follow her heart to the man she loves, a trade unionist in her father's company, regardless of her father's feelings. She also appeared in All My Sons, Roseanna McCoy, and So Big.

Her most notable role was as Shelley Winters' character's friend in the 1965 hit film A Patch of Blue. She also played in the movie Ask Any Girl as Jeannie with Shirley MacLaine. Fraser's stage career spanned over three decades and included Broadway productions of The Best Man, The Family, and Tunnel of Love (she also appeared in the 1958 film version).

== Television ==
She played Hazel Norris on the television version of Fibber McGee and Molly, Frances Warner in McKeever and the Colonel, Josie Ryan in Off We Go, Mildred Hogan in One Happy Family, and Sgt. Bilko's longtime girlfriend Joan on The Phil Silvers Show. She also guest-starred on many popular television series, including three guest appearances on Perry Mason, such as the role of Estelle Paige in the 1966 episode "The Case of the Sausalito Sunrise." She also made four appearances on Maude.

In 1966, she appeared in the TV series Gunsmoke, playing Daisy Lou” in the episode “”Which Doctor?”.

== Book ==
Fraser wrote the book Once Upon a Dime. Newspaper columnist Terry Vernon described the book as "a humorous account of what happens to a divorced actress with three children who arrives in Hollywood."

== Death ==
On May 5, 2005, Fraser died of congestive heart failure in Woodland Hills, California at age 85. She was cremated, and her ashes scattered at sea.

== Filmography ==
Year	Title	Role	Notes
1941	One Foot in Heaven	Eileen Spence	
1942	The Man Who Came to Dinner	June Stanley	
1942	Busses Roar	Betty	
1942	The Hidden Hand	Mary Winfield	
1942	Commandos Strike at Dawn	Anna Korstad	
1948	All My Sons	Lydia Lubey	
1949	Roseanna McCoy	Bess McCoy	
1949	Dear Wife	Kate Collins	
1950	Hills of Oklahoma	Sharon Forbes	
1951	When I Grow Up	Mother Reed (modern)	
1951	Callaway Went Thataway	Marie	
1951	Death of a Salesman	Miss Forsythe	uncredited
1953	So Big	Julie Hempel	
1954	The Steel Cage	Marie, Louie's Girl	segment "The Chef"
1954	Young at Heart	Amy Tuttle	
1958	The Tunnel of Love	Alice Pepper	
1959	Ask Any Girl	Jennie Boyden	
1962	Two for the Seesaw	Sophie	
1963	Who's Been Sleeping in My Bed?	Dora Ashley	
1965	A Patch of Blue	Sadie	
1966	Seconds	Plump Blonde	
1966	The Glass Bottom Boat	Nina Bailey	
1967	The Way West	Mrs. Fairman	
1967	Tony Rome	Irma	
1967	The Graduate	Party Guest	uncredited
1967	The Ballad of Josie	Widow Renfrew	
1980	9 to 5		uncredited

== Television ==
Year	Title	Role	Notes
1959	Alfred Hitchcock Presents	Dorothy Forbes	season 4, episode 23: "I'll Take Care of You"
1964	The Addams Family	Madelyn Smith	season 1, episode 31: "Uncle Fester's Toupee"
1967	The Monkees	Judge	season 2, episode 2: "The Picture Frame"
