= Glenn Anders =

American actor (1889–1981)

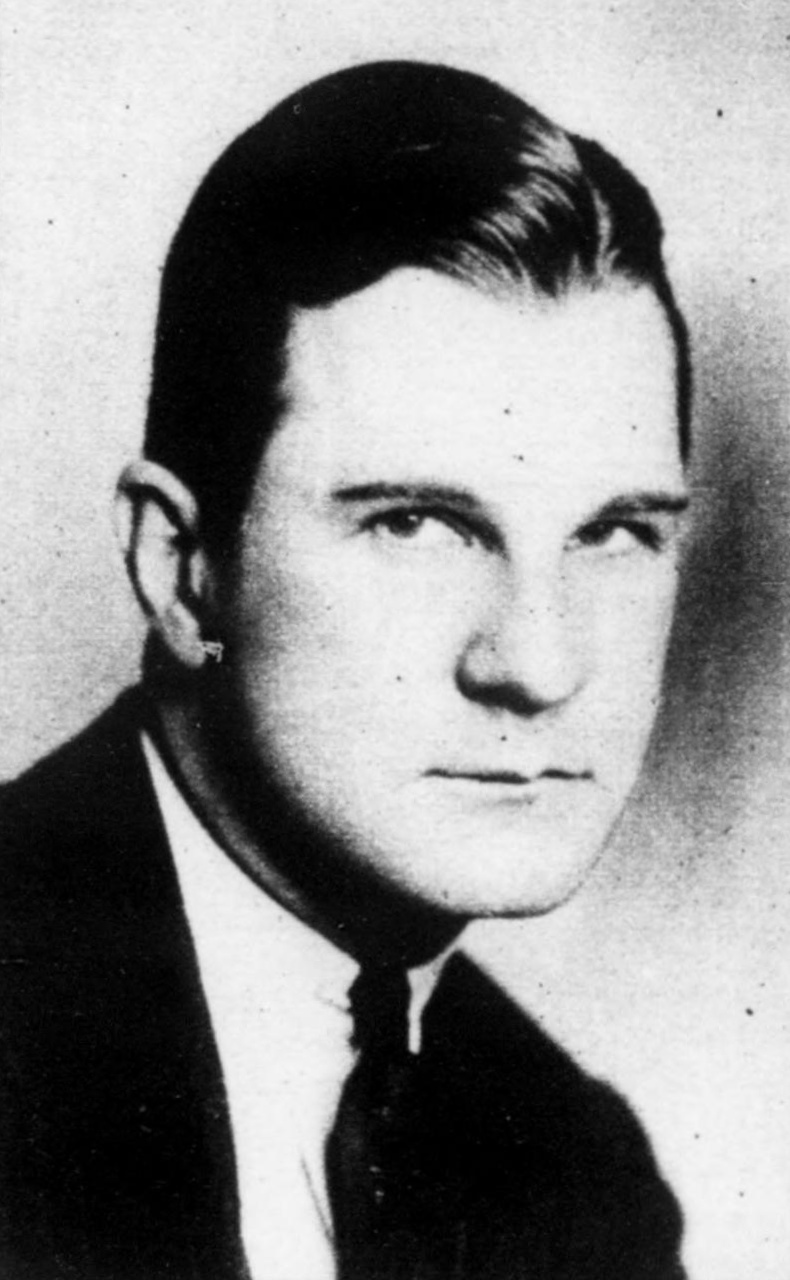
- Anders in 1929
- Born: September 1, 1889; Los Angeles, California, U.S.
- Died: October 26, 1981 (aged 92); Englewood, New Jersey, U.S.
- Resting place: Kensico Cemetery, Valhalla, New York
- Education: Columbia University
- Occupation: Actor
- Years active: 1925–1953

Glenn Anders (September 1, 1889 – October 26, 1981) was an American actor, most notable for his work on the stage. He was trained as an actor at the Wallace Dramatic School in his native city of Los Angeles. There he began his career in repertory theatre before touring in the Orpheum Circuit in vaudeville. While primarily known for his work in the theatre he also appeared in American television and film.

== Life and career ==
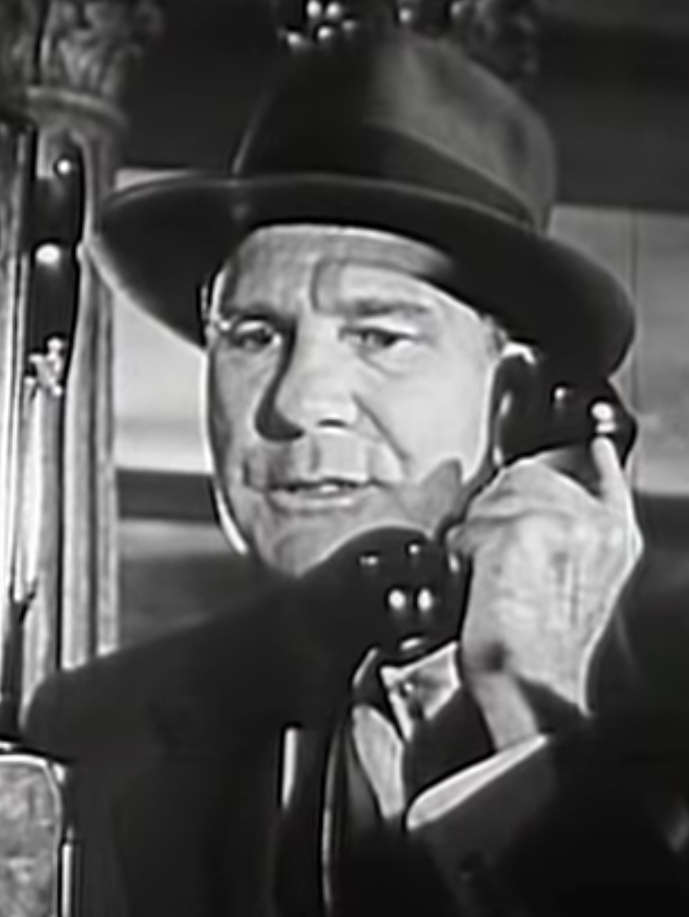
Anders in Behave Yourself! (1951)

Glenn Anders was born in Los Angeles, California on September 1, 1889. His father was of Swedish birth and his mother was an American originally from Vermont. He was trained as an actor at the Wallace Dramatic School in Los Angeles, and began his career in L.A. performing in repertory theatre. He made his stage debut with the Los Angeles Stock Company in Macbeth.

Anders branched out into vaudeville and toured in the Orpheum circuit. He arrived in New York City in 1919 and attended Columbia University from 1919 until 1921. He made his Broadway debut in 1919 in Just Around the Corner. In 1921, he scored the male lead in The Demi-Virgin, a farce that was controversial, but a hit at the box office.

Anders had a distinguished career on Broadway, appearing in three Pulitzer Prize winning plays: Hell Bent for Heaven (1924, as Andy Lowry), written by Hatcher Hughes; They Knew What They Wanted (1924, as Joe) by Sidney Howard; and Strange Interlude (1928, as Ned Darrell) by Eugene O'Neill. Other significant roles he performed on the New York stage included Reuben Light in O'Neill's Dynamo (1929), Pat Farley in Philip Barry's Hotel Universe (1930), Victor Hallam in Rose Franken's Another Language (1932), Bill Blake in Samson Raphaelson's Skylark (1939), Alexander Craig in Franken's Soldier's Wife (1944), and Carleton Fitzgerald in Moss Hart's Light Up the Sky (1948). His final role on Broadway was in the 1957-1958 production of Time Remembered.

He made a handful of film and TV appearances, most famously as a scheming lawyer in Orson Welles' The Lady from Shanghai (1947). Other film roles included M (1951), a remake of Fritz Lang's 1931 classic.

On October 26, 1981, Anders died aged 92 in Englewood, New Jersey, at the Actors' Fund Home. He is interred in Kensico Cemetery in Valhalla, New York.

== Filmography ==
| Year | Title | Role | Notes |
|---|---|---|---|
| 1925 | Sally of the Sawdust | Leon – the Acrobat | |
| 1930 | Laughter | Ralph Le Sainte | |
| 1934 | By Your Leave | Freddie Wilkins | |
| 1941 | Nothing but the Truth | Dick Donnelly | |
| 1945 | Rhapsody in Blue | Party Guest | Uncredited |
| 1947 | The Lady from Shanghai | George Grisby | |
| 1950 | Nancy Goes to Rio | Arthur Barrett | |
| 1951 | Tarzan's Peril | Andrews | |
| 1951 | M | Riggert | |
| 1951 | Behave Yourself! | Pete the Pusher | |
