= Dynamo (play) =

- Written by: Eugene O'Neill
- Original language: English
- Genre: Drama

Premiere
- Date premiered: 1929
- Place premiered: United States

Dynamo is a play in three acts, written by Eugene O'Neill in 1927 and 1928; after its premiere in 1929, O'Neill revised the text for publication.

== Production history ==
The play, starring Glenn Anders and Claudette Colbert, opened on Broadway on February 11, 1929, and closed in March, after 50 performances. The play was considered a failure for O'Neill, whose other plays of the 1920s played for much longer runs, and the play is rarely revived.

== Plot ==
The characters comprise two families and one extra:

- Reverend Hutchins Light
- Amelia, his wife, and
- Reuben, their son

Who live next door to:

- Ramsay Fife, superintendent of a hydro-electric plant (and staunch atheist)
- May, his wife
- Ada, their daughter.

Jennings, who does not appear until the final act, is an operator at the plant.

In the first act, O'Neill establishes a conflict between the Lights and the Fifes that is marked by their religious differences and has soured into personal hatred. Reuben, however, loves Ada. And Ada, described as a flapper or 'modern woman,' likes Reuben enough to run around with him, but teases him for being weak. Throughout the play, however, she affectionately calls him "Rube," which means 'dunce.'

The Lights are superstitious and shudder at lightning. On a stormy night, Fife tricks Reuben and his father into falling for a joke because they hadn't read the newspaper.

Angry at having been fooled, Reuben runs away from home. He only corresponds with his parents by sending mocking postcards that he has electrocuted their god. When he does return, he is stronger, colder, and sharply rational. He ravages Ada unemotionally and repeatedly claims that electricity is the god of everything.

Upon returning home, he is distraught to learn that his mother had died just before he arrived. Guilty and somewhat disillusioned, he turns to the dynamos in the hydro-electric plant for answers. He sees them as motherly, and tries to get them to forgive him. Eventually, he brings Ada to the dynamos to convert her. When he feels the dynamos have rejected her (remembering that his own mother called Ada a harlot) he shoots Ada, climbs up to the dynamo's brushes, and electrocutes himself. The play closes in Mrs. Fife's helpless expression of distress at the dynamo's treatment of them all.
