= The Tunnel of Love (novel) =

Novel by Peter De Vries

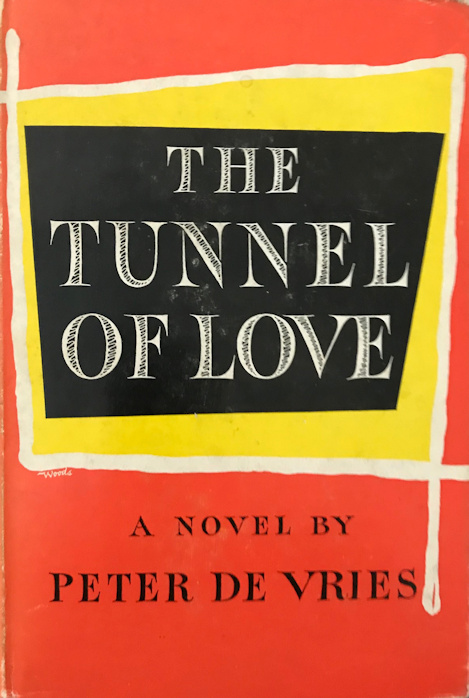
- First edition cover
- Author: Peter De Vries
- Cover artist: Miriam Woods
- Language: English
- Genre: Comic novel
- Publisher: Little, Brown and Company
- Publication date: May 12, 1954
- Publication place: United States
- Pages: 246

The Tunnel of Love is a novel by American author Peter De Vries; it was published on May 12, 1954, by Little, Brown and Company. The novel is written in first-person narration from the viewpoint of a magazine art editor. He tells the story of his neighbors in fictional Avalon, Connecticut, a cartoonist named Augie Poole and his wife Isolde, and their efforts to adopt a child, using the narrator and his wife Audrey as references. However, the majority of interactions and dialogue concern the narrator, often as internal musings, and entire chapters go by without a mention of Augie or Isolde. The story spans roughly three years in the life of these two couples, including a look ahead prologue at the beginning.

The novel was constructed adapting five short stories published several years earlier in The New Yorker. These formed the basis for chapters 6, 11, 13, 15, and 17 in the 1st edition. The novel was a sleeper hit, gradually building up readership over the summer of 1954 until it started appearing on bestseller lists. While there is some mild situational and character-based comedy, the main source of humor for the novel is in wordplay; the author De Vries was a connoisseur of punning. Despite some situations where it might be expected, there are no double entendres of a sexual nature in the novel. There is some Walter Mitty style daydreaming by the narrator, (Note: Perhaps a tribute to James Thurber who was De Vries mentor at The New Yorker.) not of heroic action but of delivered witticisms.

== Characters ==
Only characters with significant presence and dialogue are listed.

=== Major ===
- The Narrator is Art Editor for weekly The Townsman and neighbor to the Pooles. He daydreams of romantic liaisons at a fantasy hideaway called Moot Point, Maine. His surname is never mentioned. In one of his fantasies a paramour calls him "Bruce" (Note: 1st edition, 5th printing, July 1954, Chapter 2, page 18.) while at the end of the book he is referred to as "Dick". (Note: 1st edition, 5th printing, July 1954, Chapter 20, page 232.) There are no other references to his first name. His background is parallel to author De Vries: born in the midwest, attended Northwestern University, a magazine editor with four children.
- Audrey is the narrator's wife and mother to their four children. Her birth name was Aurora. She and the narrator quarrel frequently but not seriously, and she is the only character in the book to tolerate his puns.
- Augie Poole is a cartoonist who cannot draw well but has splendid ideas for gags. He is stubborn, plays the horses, and is a serial cheater, telling the narrator that Cornelia Bly is his tenth affair since marrying Isolde Brown. He feels guilty about not feeling guilty, and so cheats to restore equilibrium.
- Isolde Brown Poole is a former actress and Augie's wife for the past five years. Her career was only so-so, and the couple live off her grandmother's money. She is the one who wants a child. She is blind to Augie's infidelities until he finally confesses.

=== Minor ===
- Dr. Vancouver is a hypochondriac GP, balding, with a double chin, and ruddy face.
- Maude is the narrator's oldest child, twelve when the story begins. By the end she takes over babysitting her younger siblings.
- Marco is the narrator's second child, nine when the story begins. He dislikes his name and wants to change it.
- Ralph is the narrator's third child, five when the story begins.
- Phoebe is the narrator's youngest child, four when the story begins. Precocious and strong-willed, she wants to change her name also.
- Mrs. Terkle is a caseworker at the Rock-a-bye adoption agency.
- Cornelia Bly is an artist with whom Augie has an affair which results in a baby.
- Carveth Bly is a composer, brother to Cornelia Bly.
- Ernest Mills is a TV director, nicknamed "Putzi", who directs the PTA skit the narrator wrote and is an indirect cause of a fight between Augie and Morley.
- Terry McBain is a young would-be writer with whom the narrator has an affair.

=== Peripheral ===
- Mrs. Mash is a caseworker for the Crib adoption agency, assigned to review the Poole's adoption request.
- Mrs. Goodbread is a babysitter, originally from Central Europe, who tends first the narrator's children then later the Poole's kids.
- Morley is a bachelor at a cocktail party in Avalon, who precipitates a fight with Augie.
- Hubert Bly is a perpetual literary student, winner of endless scholarships, and another brother to Cornelia Bly.
- Emory Bly is an ordained Minister with a progressive outlook, and the third brother to Cornelia Bly.
- Hal Mansfield is a neighbor in Avalon, who gives Augie and the narrator a lift, and takes the latter on a group sleigh ride.
- Mrs. Kipling is Hal Mansfield's sister-in-law; the narrator annoys her with his puns while on the sleigh ride. (Note: She uses the terms "nor'easter" and "sou'wester", a source of amusement and punning to the narrator, while the author De Vries obviously meant her character name as an allusion to the famous poem.)
- Mrs. Larch is an administrator at the Rock-a-bye adoption agency where Augie Jr is adopted.

== Plot summary ==
The novel opens with a look ahead: the narrator feigns illness to avoid the case worker Mrs. Mash from the Crib Adoption Agency, who wants to question him about the Pooles suitability as parents. Knowing Augie as he does, he fakes losing his voice, causing his wife Audrey to summon Dr. Vancouver. The doctor can't find anything wrong and suggests stress. After he leaves, the narrator thinks back to when he and Audrey first met the Pooles at a cocktail party. (From this point the action proceeds in chronological order).

At the cocktail party the narrator meets Isolde Poole. He is fascinated and likens her in his own mind to Joan Fontaine. Isolde tells him a story from her acting days. The narrator is bemused and incorporates her into his usual fantasy, centered around a cabin in the Maine woods called Moot Point, since the legal title to the imaginary location is in doubt. She is not the first woman he has mentally transported to this hideaway, which constitutes his sole act of infidelity to Audrey. In passing the narrator also mentions meeting Augie, who made no impression on him.

Invited to dinner at the Poole's house, the narrator and Audrey are embarrassed to realize Augie is the "A. Poole" whose cartoons he has been rejecting in his capacity of Art Editor for The Townsman. Isolde uses their discomfiture to announce she has listed them as references for adopting a child. As Augie shows the narrator his studio in the converted loft of a barn, he confesses that the property was purchased for them by Isolde's grandmother, on whose bounty they also survive. Told his cartoon ideas would fetch a high price for themselves without the drawings, Augie declines to be a "gagman".

Back home, Audrey and the narrator try to ready their four children for a visit by Mrs. Terkle, case worker for the Rock-a-bye adoption agency. Maude, the oldest, is acquiescent, but Marco and Phoebe are iconoclasts with their own agendas, and Ralph is incapable of staying neat and clean. The narrator has little authority over his progeny and the visit by Mrs. Terkle does not go well. As time goes by, Isolde wonders why they don't hear back from the adoption agency. When she goes to visit her grandmother, Audrey and the narrator witness Augie's unsuccessful attempt to pick up a woman at an outdoor party. Later the narrator chides Augie, who confesses his serial infidelity since marrying Isolde.

The local PTA asks the narrator to write a skit for a benefit. He obliges, and offers to play the male lead, as Isolde has been asked to play the female lead. Ernst Mills directs the play, cutting the narrator's lengthy script down to five minutes. While the rehearsal is delayed, the narrator notices Augie sidling up to artist Cornelia Bly, who is doing the scenery. The two of them begin an affair. In time, Augie paradoxically feels guilty for continuing to sleep with his wife, as a betrayal of Cornelia.

Audrey takes the kids to visit her parent for several weeks, leaving the narrator to attend a party alone. There he meets Terry McBain, a young writer trying to sell articles to The Townsman. The narrator encourages her, not revealing he is married. They start a romance, but the narrator's guilt feelings about Audrey and his kids cause him to take it slow. He helps her sell an article to Reader's Digest, but they decide not to see each other again.

Cornelia Bly has become pregnant and the announcement triggers a belated moral epiphany in Augie. He decides to sell his cartoon ideas, which the narrator buys for other cartoonists to turn into drawings. Augie presses the narrator to give the money to Cornelia and persuade her to put the baby up for adoption. She agrees to turn the baby, once born, over to Rock-a-bye adoption agency, since they have rejected the Pooles for lack of steady finances. Isolde learns Augie has been earning money from selling his ideas, which she knows he was loath to do. She is buoyed up by his change as she interprets it to mean he is ready to earn a regular income as a gagman.

Events have now caught up to the prologue with Mrs. Mash. Augie tells the narrator that Isolde has resubmitted an application to Rock-a-bye since the Pooles now have a regular income. The narrator tries to warn Cornelia by phone to not use Rock-a-bye, but fails. Rock-a-bye informs the Poole's they have a baby for them, and both couples go to pick it up. Augie faints at the sight of his newborn son, which bears a strong resemblance to him. As months go by and the infant looks more like Augie, Isolde becomes suspicious. He finally breaks down and admits the baby is his, at which she throws him out of the house. However, a few weeks later Isolde discovers she is pregnant. The Poole's reconcile, and the narrator finds he no longer needs his fantasy daydreams of Moot Point.

== Reception ==
Charles J. Rolo wrote in The New York Times: "The Tunnel of Love is a humorous novel of the choicest order. Nothing as entrancing has come my way since The Catcher in the Rye." Richard L. Hirsch in the Hartford Courant said: "Peter DeVries has written the best humorous novel of the year". However, John Davenport in The Observer was less enthusiastic. He recognized the narrator, not Augie Poole, was the central character but felt the first person narrative was a mistake.

== Adaptations ==
=== Stage ===
De Vries produced his own script for a stage version which the Theatre Guild was reported to be considering for production in 1956. However, Joseph Fields was largely responsible for the play that was eventually debuted in New Haven, Connecticut during January 1957 then ran for a year on Broadway.

=== Film ===
MGM made a film version of the stage play in 1958 that was not a box-office success.
