= Molière (play) =

Play by Philip Moeller

- Original language: English
- Written by: Philip Moeller
- Subject: Character study of Molière
- Genre: Historical romance
- Setting: Theatre of the Palais-Royal, Sep 1672-Feb 1673

Premiere
- Date: March 17, 1919
- Place: Liberty Theatre
- Directed by: Henry Miller

Molière is a 1919 play written by Philip Moeller, who subtitled it "A Romantic Play in Three Acts". It has a medium-sized cast, moderate pacing, and two sets; Acts I and III share the same set. Some of the play's characters are historical, figures from the French court of the 1670s. The first two acts have a single scene, while the third has a curtain drop to signal the passage of two hours time. The play shows a few scenes from the twilight of Molière, as he loses the favor of Louis XIV but retains his independence.

The play has an atypical approach for Moeller, who usually wrote historical satires that some critics said verged on burlesque. Also unusual was Moeller's reduced involvement with the original production. At the time he was wrapped up with staging the first Theatre Guild productions. Instead, Molière was shaped for the stage by producer-director Henry Miller, who also played the eponymous lead. Moeller acknowledged Miller's creative contribution in the dedication for the published play.

== Characters ==
Characters are listed in order of appearance within their scope.

Lead

- Armande Béjart — young wife to Molière.
- Jean-Baptiste Poquelin — known to the world as Molière.
- Louis XIV — the King of France.
- Françoise — Madame de Montespan, mistress to Louis XIV.

Supporting

- Baron — a seventeen year old member of Molière's company.
- La Forest — a sixty-eight-year-old woman, cook and friend to Molière.
- Colinge — an old actor, with Molière since the beginning.
- De Luzon — a young courtier. (Note: The spelling of this name in theatre programs, newspapers, and even in the published text varied between the form shown and "De Lauzon".)
- La Fontaine — the writer of the fables.
- Giovanni Lulli — a court musician, a rival to Molière for the royal favor. (Note: Moeller's interpretation of this real-life figure is ahistorical.)
- Claude Chapelle — a friend to Molière.
- The Actress Who Plays Toniette — A lead player in the third act's The Imaginary Invalid. (Note: Despite a fair amount of lines, this role was uncredited in program guides and reviews.)

Featured

- The King's Chamberlin.
- Hercules — a black page to Madame de Montespan. (Note: As was common at the time, the role was played in blackface by white actors.)
- First Lady in Waiting.
- Second Lady in Waiting.
- Lackey — This is a non-speaking role in the published text.
- A Doctor.
- Second Actress — A player in the third act's The Imaginary Invalid.

Walk-on

- Courtiers and Ladies-in-Waiting, Actors and Actresses.

== Synopsis ==
Act	Scene	Setting	Action
I	1	Molière's study in his theatre in the Palais-Royal, a September morning in 1672.	Introduces the four leads and several other characters. Molière has already written The Misanthrope, and still enjoys the king's favor, despite complaints from the clergy about Tartuffe. He seems to be blessed, but there are rumors about his young wife, whom he adores.
II	1	The apartments of Madame de Montespan at the Louvre Palace, at twilight on the same day.	Françoise has invited both Molière and Armande to her apartments, unbeknownst to each other. Armande is encouraged to visit with her secret lover De Luzon, while Mme. de Montespan tries to entice Molière. When he refuses out of loyalty to the king and love for his wife, she shows him the latter dallying in the garden beneath the balcony. The king returns unexpectedly; he is angry to find Molière and Françoise together. Françoise repeats a lie of Giovanni Lulli, that Molière has written a play satirizing Françoise, her husband, and the king. The king withdraws his favor from Molière, who responds by switching his loyalty from monarch to the nation.
III	1	Molière's study in his theatre in the Palais-Royal; about 4pm on February 17, 1673.	Chapelle, La Fontaine, and La Forest lament Molière's downfall; his wife left him, the withdrawal of the king's favor means his audiences are now sparse and semi-hostile, and his health has deteriorated. But when Molière appears, he still insists on performing his latest comedy, The Imaginary Invalid.
III	2	Molière's study in his theatre in the Palais-Royal; two hours later.	During the fourth performance of The Imaginary Invalid Molière's faltering physical condition provokes jeers from the audience, which he thinks are plaudits. Meanwhile, Colinge has persuaded Armande to have the king restore favor to Molière. Backstage, Molière collapses even as Armande arrives to embrace him. The king and his chamberlain arrive to bestow the royal amity, but they come too late: Molière is dead.

== Original production ==
=== Background ===
A newspaper columnist reported in December 1918 that Henry Miller, just coming off of a flop, was looking for a new play to produce, adding that "Blanche Bates and Holbrook Blinn are in the same boat". Whether coincidence or not, within two months all three would start rehearsals for Molière. Henry Miller, whose pockets were deeper and who had a larger company than the other two actor-managers, wound up producing and staging Moeller's play. Estelle Winwood, Forrest Robinson, and Sidney Herbert were also reported in early February 1919 to have been signed by Henry Miller.

The sets were by Lee Simonson; the costumes by Rollo Peters, made by Mme. Freisinger; incidental music was composed by Cassius Freeborn.

=== Tryouts and revisions ===
Molière had its first tryout at Ford's Grand Opera House in Baltimore, on February 24, 1919, where it played for a week. The audience was so enthusiastic after Act II that Henry Miller and Blanche Bates had to come out and give short speeches before the play could resume. The local reviewer commended Moeller's dialogue, but thought the beginning of each act dragged, while the second act "savored slightly of the purely theatrical".

The production then went to the Broad Theatre in Philadelphia, opening on March 3, 1919. Moeller was able to attend this opening, and received as big a hand after the second act as the leading actors. A local critic thought it good that Moeller was willing to take a chance on a more serious work, though the first act was "sketchy", a mere prelude to the slender plot. They summed up the play as being "...richer in rhetoric than drama".

=== Cast ===
Cast during the tryouts and original Broadway run
Role	Actor	Dates	Notes
Armande Béjart	Estelle Winwood	Feb 24, 1919 - May 10, 1919	Though already thirty-seven she was able to play the twenty-year old Armande in convincing fashion.
Molière	Henry Miller	Feb 24, 1919 - May 10, 1919	
Louis XIV	Holbrook Blinn	Feb 24, 1919 - May 10, 1919	
Françoise	Blanche Bates	Feb 24, 1919 - May 10, 1919	
Baron	James P. Hagen	Feb 24, 1919 - May 10, 1919	
La Forest	Alice Gale	Feb 24, 1919 - May 10, 1919	Of all the supporting actors Gale consistently drew the most critical appreciation.
Colinge	Forrest Robinson	Feb 24, 1919 - May 10, 1919	
The King's Chamberlin	Willard Barton	Feb 24, 1919 - May 10, 1919	
La Fontaine	Sidney Herbert	Feb 24, 1919 - May 10, 1919	
Claude Chapelle	Vincent Chambers	Feb 24, 1919 - May 10, 1919	
De Luzon	Frederick Roland	Feb 24, 1919 - May 10, 1919	
Hercules	Remo Bufano	Feb 24, 1919 - May 10, 1919	He was a mime with the Washington Square Players, later had his own marionette troupe.
Giovanni Lulli	Paul Doucet	Feb 24, 1919 - May 10, 1919	
First Lady-in-Waiting	Mary Pyne	Feb 24, 1919 - May 10, 1919	
Second Lady-in-Waiting	Marjorie Card	Feb 24, 1919 - May 10, 1919	
Lackey	William Robins	Feb 24, 1919 - May 10, 1919	
A Doctor	Wallace Roberts	Feb 24, 1919 - May 10, 1919	

=== Premiere ===
Originally intended for Henry Miller's Theater, (Note: The broad comedy Mis' Nelly of N'Orleans, which starred the Louisiana-born Mrs. Fiske, ran longer than expected because she donated hundreds of seats to returning veterans from that state.) Molière instead had its Broadway premiere on March 17, 1919, at Klaw and Erlanger's Liberty Theatre. Heywood Broun reported the climatic moment of Molière's death scene was marred by the sound of auto horns coming from the streets outside. A growing problem in the theater district, Broun suggested legal curtailment of the horns even if at the expense of a few pedestrians: "After all, there are so many people and so few good plays".

=== Reception ===
The critics liked Molière in spite of its weak drama. Charles Darnton, recalling Madame Sand, thought Moeller "very clever as a grave-digger". Darnton accorded acting honors to Blanche Bates' royal mistress, with nods to Alice Gale's La Forest and Sidney Herbert's La Fontaine. The Brooklyn Citizen also thought Bates' performance the best of the night. The Sun thought Bates' second act and Miller's third act performances excellent, and saluted Holbrook Blinn for keeping Louis XIV from looking ridiculous, but felt Moeller's writing "the most interesting element of the evening".

Heywood Broun remarked that with Moeller's writing the "great comedian appears as a man practically devoid of humor", though he didn't regard this as a fault. John Corbin pointed out Molière's unsatisfied ambition to appear in a drama had now been fulfilled by Moeller's play. Corbin also thought the play too "literesque" but "intelligently so", and was enthused about the scenery, costumes, Alice Gale, and the lead actors. Broun was enthusiastic only about Blanche Bates' performance. He felt Henry Miller's acting was inconsistent and Estelle Winwood more satisfying to the eye than the ear. Holbrook Blinn's acting was admirable, but the royal neck was too short for the regicide in Broun. Flippant though his first night review may read, Broun thought strongly enough about the play to write a two-column article about it a few days later.

=== Closing ===
The play's Broadway run closed on May 10, 1919, at the Liberty Theatre. Two nights before, an audience member had slumped from his seat to die on the floor, perhaps in sympathy with Molière and the play. (Note: The occupation of the deceased audience member was sales, making this event the first known instance for the death of a salesman in the theater.)

== Touring company ==
Producer-director Henry Miller chose to begin touring on the West Coast, starting with Los Angeles. (Note: This was very unusual; most Broadway touring itineraries started with Chicago or other large midwestern cities. The rationale was the looming Actors' Equity Association strike that would close venues in the East and Midwest, but would not impact the West Coast.) Molière opened for a one-week run at the Mason Opera House on July 7, 1919. It then went to the Potter Theatre in Santa Barbara, and the Colombia Theater in San Francisco. The tour swung through Oregon, Washington, Idaho, Utah, and Nebraska before returning east to play Boston, finishing at the Standard Theatre in Brooklyn on November 8, 1919.

=== Cast ===
Cast during the post Broadway tour
Role	Actor	Dates	Notes
Armande Béjart	Catherine Doucet	Jul 07, 1919 - Nov 08, 1919	She was the wife of Paul Doucet, who played Giovanni Lulli.
Molière	Henry Miller	Jul 07, 1919 - Nov 08, 1919	
Louis XIV	David Glassford	Jul 07, 1919 - Nov 08, 1919	
Françoise	Blanche Bates	Jul 07, 1919 - Nov 08, 1919	
Baron	James P. Hagen	Jul 07, 1919 - Nov 08, 1919	
La Forest	Alice Gale	Jul 07, 1919 - Nov 08, 1919	
Colinge	Forrest Robinson	Jul 07, 1919 -	
Colinge	George Farren	Oct 06, 1919 - Nov 08, 1919	
The King's Chamberlin	Paul Gaston	Jul 07, 1919 - Nov 08, 1919	
La Fontaine	Sidney Herbert	Jul 07, 1919 - Nov 08, 1919	
Claude Chapelle	Vincent Chambers	Jul 07, 1919 - Nov 08, 1919	
De Luzon	Frederick Roland	Jul 07, 1919 - Nov 08, 1919	
Hercules	Frank Longacre	Jul 07, 1919 - Nov 08, 1919	
Giovanni Lulli	Paul Doucet	Jul 07, 1919 - Nov 08, 1919	
First Lady-in-Waiting	Elsie Frederic	Jul 07, 1919 - Nov 08, 1919	
Second Lady-in-Waiting	Florence Busby	Jul 07, 1919 - Nov 08, 1919	
Lackey	William Robins	Jul 07, 1919 - Nov 08, 1919	
A Doctor	Wallace Roberts	Jul 07, 1919 - Nov 08, 1919	
