= José Ruben =

French-American actor (1884–1969)

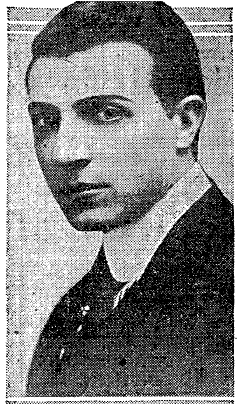
- José Ruben 1916
- Born: December 8, 1884; Paris, France
- Died: April 28, 1969 (aged 84); New York City, New York
- Education: Conservatoire de Paris
- Alma mater: La Sorbonne (attended)
- Occupations: Actor, Director
- Years active: 1904-1956
- Spouses: Mary Nash (m. 1918; div. 1927); Victoria Wehrum (m. 1949)

José Ruben (December 8, 1884 – April 28, 1969) was a French-born actor whose career from 1910 on was in the United States. He first rose to prominence in 1916-1917 with the Washington Square Players, and for the next ten years was a highly regarded lead player. He acted in over twenty silent films and was a fixture on Broadway stages, as both performer and director, for over forty years. He also taught drama at Barnard College and was a stage director for the New York City Opera.

== Early life ==
Ruben was born in Paris, France, to a family wealthy enough to fund his education and travel. He had at least two younger sisters. According to an early profile, he could outargue anyone in the family, so it was decided he should study law. He had studied English in secondary school, but found it difficult to understand native speakers, so he spent six months living in London in order to develop an ear for the language.

After two years at the Sorbonne, he abandoned law to enter the Conservatoire de Paris as a dramatics student. He completed the two-year course in 1904 and became an apprentice at the Théâtre l'Louvre. The following year Ruben joined the Théâtre de l'Odéon, from which he entered Sarah Bernhardt's troupe in 1906. Ruben stayed with Bernhardt for the next four years, playing in a large repertoire of French-language productions throughout France, England, and other parts of Europe.

== Arrival in America ==
Ruben was still a member of Bernhardt's troupe when it arrived in America for a tour in 1910. Beginning with L'Aiglon by Edmond Rostand in Chicago on October 31, 1910, the tour performed a different production from its repertoire of twenty plays each night. Lost among a troupe of forty-six, with the critics attention focused almost exclusively on Bernhardt, it is not possible to detail Ruben's contribution to the tour, which finished up with Camille in New York City on June 21, 1911. While Bernhardt and her troupe sailed for France the following day, Ruben stayed behind in America. When teaching at Barnard College in 1944, a school reporter asked him about Sarah Bernhardt, to which he "reluctantly" replied: "She was a great actress in that time, but I dread to think of how audiences would react to her today".

== The Garden of Allah ==
Through Bernhardt's American business manager Ruben met producer George C. Tyler, who in turn introduced him to Robert Hichens and Mary Anderson. Hichens and Anderson decided Ruben would be perfect in the role of Batouch for their stage version of Hichen's The Garden of Allah, which Tyler was producing for Liebler & Company. The play opened October 21, 1911, at the Century Theatre, marking Ruben's first verifiable Broadway credit and his first English-language role. Ruben was one of only two supporting actors singled out for praise by the Brooklyn Daily Eagle reviewer, and also earned commendation from the New York World critic. Described as a spectacle with a story, the production was the largest ever mounted on an American stage to that point. The cast included numerous authentic inhabitants of Tunisia and Algeria, as well as livestock. When the play closed on May 18, 1912, it had been viewed by 375,000 people, and established Ruben as able to handle English-language roles.

The Liebler Company cast Ruben for its national tour of The Garden of Allah starting in Chicago at the Auditorium on August 31, 1912. The tour encompassed actors, props, sets, and livestock (camels, goats, horses, and mules) used in the production. While the animals were housed in a nearby stable, those cast members actually from North Africa were accommodated in a warehouse, since no Chicago hotel would accept them as guests. The tour visited Cincinnati, Cleveland, Pittsburgh, and Philadelphia throughout the Fall of 1912, playing Boston from January thru March 1913. While in Boston, Ruben filed a Petition for Naturalization, with the help of the tour's manager and two journalists as witnesses. Ruben continued with the tour until it finished in May 1913.

== Ruben and Madame Yorska ==
Ruben joined the company of the French Drama Society in Manhattan in December 1913. This was headed by Madame Yorska, like Ruben a former pupil of Bernhardt. A colossal poseur, her real name was Elsie Stern; she was from New Orleans, Louisiana, but was perfectly willing to let journalists and audiences think she was French. The troupe performed matinee programs at the Harris Theatre, before going on tour. Ruben played all the leading male roles opposite Madame Yorska. The tour finished up the season in Ottawa, Canada, during May 1914.

During the early fall of 1914, Madame Yorska's troupe toured on a vaudeville circuit in a one-act play called Days of War, with Ruben as the male lead. Ironically, one reviewer praised Ruben's performance while mentioning difficulty understanding Yorska's strongly accented English. Ruben returned with the troupe to New York City and for the winter of 1914-1915 played French-language works in Manhattan and a few nearby cities. During the first half of 1915 Ruben continued with Madame Yorska's troupe, again playing Days of War in vaudeville theatres, and performing benefits for French war relief.

== Biograph film work ==
Ruben appears to have detached himself from Madame Yorska's troupe in the summer of 1915. He returned to New York where he made a short film, A Daughter of Earth. This was the first of many pictures he would make at the Biograph Company during 1915-1916, but not his first film. He had done an independently produced short called Lord Chumley in 1913-1914, for which his role is unknown and verification is lacking.

With his fourth Biograph short, Ashes of Inspiration, Ruben became the central figure in the storyline, an artist torn between his wife and his muse. He is again the central figure in his fifth short for Biograph, The Rehearsal, this time as a playwright with a treacherous fiancé and a new helpmate. His first longer work was a Biograph special three-reeler, produced in association with Klaw and Erlanger, titled His Hand and Seal, from a story by Carolyn Wells. By the time Biograph stopped making movies in late spring 1916, Ruben had appeared as a lead in twenty-three films.

== Washington Square Players ==
Ruben had returned to the stage briefly in May 1916, but otherwise had no known performing work for several months after the steady job with Biograph ended. It was perhaps a measure of desperation that saw him join the Washington Square Players (WSP), a semi-amateur troupe that drew lots of critical attention but which couldn't afford to match professional Broadway salaries. (Note: According to columnist Louis Sheaffer, Ruben went from $500 a week at Biograph to $50 a week with the WSP. See Brooklyn Daily Eagle for March 22, 1951, page 6.) Ruben appeared with the WSP on the first bill of their third season. The WSP specialized in one-act plays, usually presenting four on each bill. Ruben debuted in Lover's Luck, immediately drawing praise from the critics. His professional training and experience stood out among the largely untrained players, most of whom had careers other than the stage. Alexander Woollcott went so far as to say that Ruben "is by far the best actor the group has known".

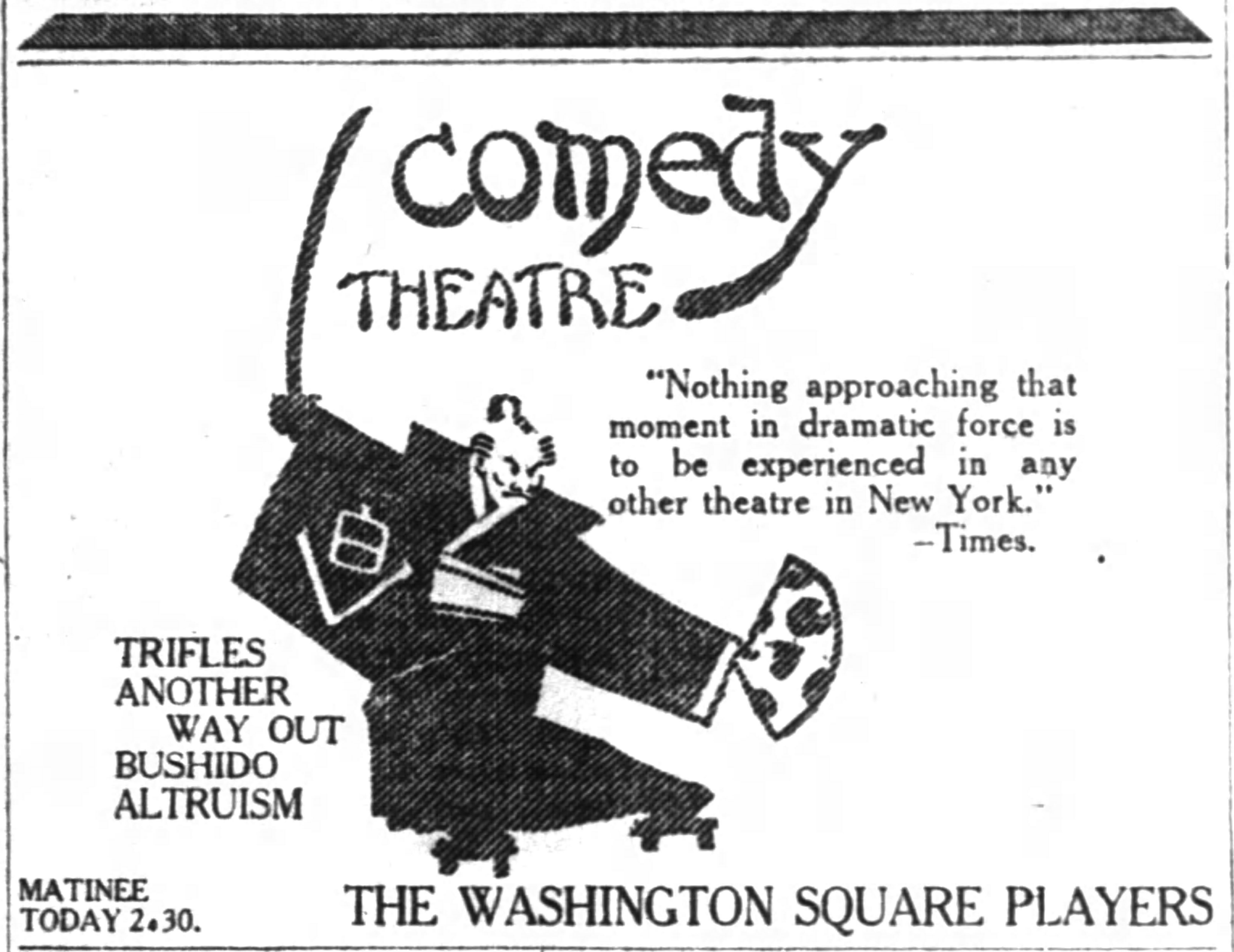
November 1916

The WSP responded to the favorable notices by casting Ruben in three playlets for its second bill starting November 13, 1916. He played an unwed husband in Another Way Out, an original satire of Greenwich Village social mores by Lawrence Langner; the tragic lead in Bushido, a translated excerpt from an 18th Century Japanese play by Takeda Izumo; and a self-absorbed character in Altruism, a satirical farce by Karl Ettlinger. Of Ruben in Bushido, Heywood Broun wrote "José Ruben gives an extraordinarily impressive performance as the father who sacrifices his son. It is the best bit of acting in the evening...". The critic for The New York Times agreed, while also praising Ruben for the other two plays in which he performed. This program of plays, strongly supported by Ruben's acting, would become the most successful of all WSP bills, playing over 100 performances thru February 1917.

Midway thru this four-month run Ruben played the lead in a special matinee for WSP subscribers only, and was also the subject of a profile in The New York Times. For the season's third bill he performed in just one play, A Private Account, for which the New York Herald said Ruben was "the greatest find the Washington Square Players have made this season". (Note: At the time this was universally acknowledged by critics, but in hindsight a young drama apprentice from Buffalo, New York, who made her professional debut with one line in Bushido, would go on to greater fame as Katharine Cornell.) Illness limited Ruben's participation in the WSP's fourth bill of the season, but he recovered in time to star with Mary Shaw in Ghosts, which ended the season. Meant for a one week engagement, it was held over for three weeks due to popular demand. Alexander Woollcott and Heywood Broun again wrote highly of Ruben's acting as Oswald Alving.

== Madame Sand ==
Ruben left the WSP after a single season. He signed with director Arthur Hopkins in June 1917 for a production to be mounted that fall. This was Madame Sand, a comedy about George Sand and her lovers by Philip Moeller starring Mrs. Fiske. The production previewed in Baltimore during late October, and premiered at Broadway's Criterion Theatre on November 19, 1917. Aside from Mrs. Fiske, who wore pants and smoked cigars while in character, Ruben was the only actor singled out for praise by critics. The reviewer for Brooklyn Life said Ruben's acting "is not eclipsed even by that of so great an actress as Mrs. Fiske, and he far surpasses any member of her supporting company". Burns Mantle recognized that the play itself would appeal only to "a limited and intellectual public"; it closed at the Knickerbocker Theatre on January 12, 1918. Madame Sand then went on tour for two months, with Ruben continuing in his role.

== Broadway stage: 1918-1920 ==
Laurette Taylor chose Ruben for a program of excerpts from three Shakespeare plays, in which he played Romeo to her Juliet in the balcony scene. It played for a single matinee at the Criterion Theatre on April 5, 1918, to a small audience of fellow actors. Her performance was panned by reviewers, and even Ruben drew a very rare poor review, with only Heywood Broun commending him.

Ruben had more success partnering with Olive Wyndham in an English translation of Georges Courteline's The Fine System, which played on the B. F. Keith vaudeville circuit during May and June 1918. He was then cast in I.O.U., which co-starred Mary Nash; it opened at the Savoy Theatre in Asbury Park, New Jersey on August 5, 1918. Ruben's character changed from the Japanese "Baron Tori" in the tryouts to the East Indian "Ramdah Sima" by the time the play reached Broadway on October 5, 1918, but no rewriting could save this play. It closed after a brief run, upon which Ruben married his co-star. Newspapers made much of their romance, with a full-page story and photos, even suggesting the play folded early because they couldn't convincingly play antagonists.

Almost immediately the couple's work pulled them apart; Nash went into another New York play while Ruben joined the touring company of A Marriage of Convenience. The tour finished up in January 1919; there is a seven-month gap before Ruben's next known performing work. During the latter part of this time Actors' Equity Association (AEA) launched an actor's strike. Ruben was elected to the board of the Actors' Fidelity League, a new organization of actors opposed to the strike tactics of AEA. However, with the backing of Samuel Gompers and the American Federation of Labor, the AEA won out.

The Dancer by Edward Locke opened October 1, 1919, at the Harris Theatre. A story about a Russian ballerina, it had a lead actress who could neither dance nor speak with a convincing accent. Heywood Broun and Alexander Woollcott blasted the acting, with the exception of Ruben. Ruben next appeared as a morphine-addicted pianist in Sacred and Profane Love by Arnold Bennett, which opened in February 1920. This production had a good run, and towards the end of it Ruben gave a long interview to the New York Tribune in which he discussed acting.

Mary Nash was then appearing on the English stage in The Man Who Came Back. Ruben applied for his first passport as a US Citizen on May 1, 1920, giving his destination as England and his reason for travelling as "To visit my wife Mary Nash now playing in London". The application also revealed he was residing at the Algonquin Hotel in New York. Ruben sailed on May 15, intending to return in time to start rehearsal on his next play, The Checkerboard. After a few weeks of tryouts, this comedy opened on Broadway in mid-August, (Note: Before air-conditioned theaters, a summer opening in Manhattan signalled a property for which the backers had few expectations.) with Ruben as the star. Critics were not impressed, one opining that Ruben "did well but in an unenthusiastic way". Alexander Woollcott blamed the writing, saying the play was amusing but not believable. It closed on September 4, 1920, but Ruben was soon at work staging Thy Name Is Woman, in which both he and Mary Nash would star. Ruben played a deformed, malignant smuggler in the Spanish Pyrenees, who stabs his wife Guerita (Mary Nash) when she betrays him with a young soldier (Curtis Cooksey). The play was successful, running for over fifteen weeks at the Playhouse Theatre then moving to other theatres for another three weeks before going on tour thru May 1921. It later was adapted for a 1924 silent film, Thy Name Is Woman.

== Stage and screen: 1921-1924 ==
Ruben next starred with Clare Eames in Swords, a costume drama by Sidney Howard, which opened on Broadway on September 1, 1921. It closed on October 1, done in by warm weather according to one reviewer.

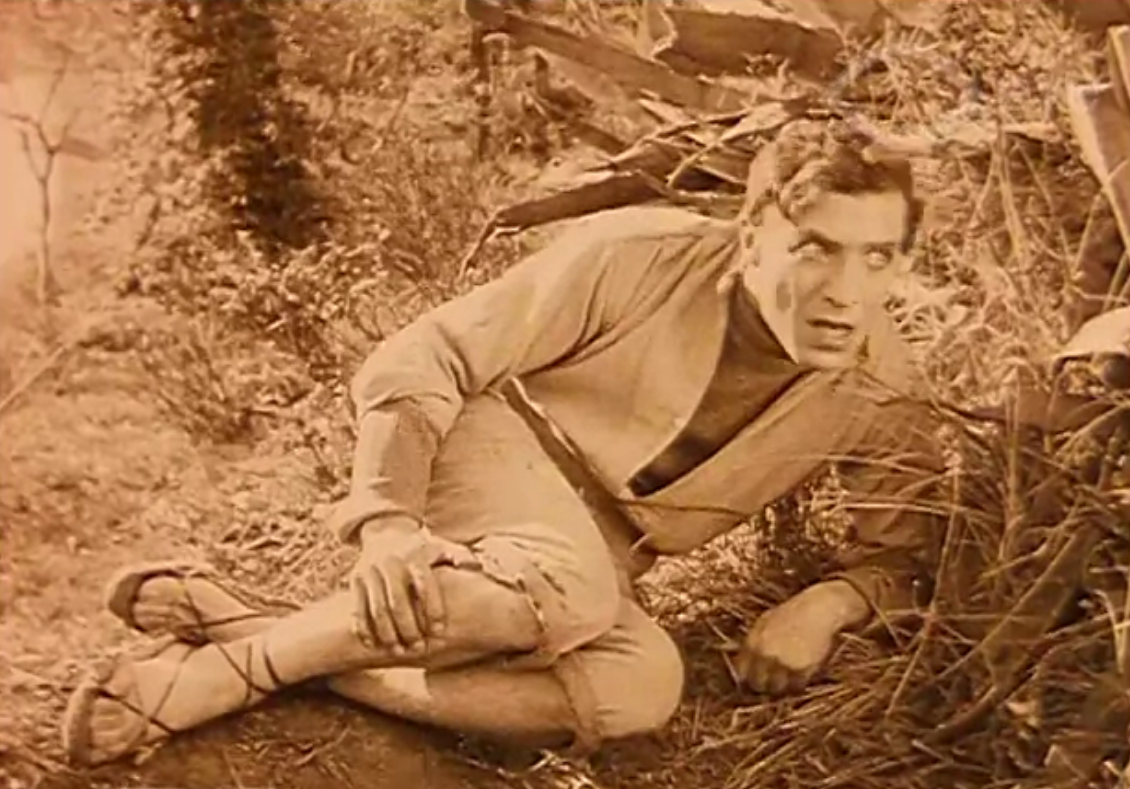
Ruben in "The Man from Home" (1922)

During late 1921 Ruben travelled to Italy to shoot a film called The Man from Home, which was released by April 1922. He had begun another film, When Knighthood Was in Flower, earlier in the year but suffered a serious eye injury on the set that forced him to stop all performing work. By October 1922 he had recovered well enough to make another film titled Black Fury, which was released as Dark Secrets in January 1923. Reviewer Paul Gallico called it "trashy" and said Ruben was "the only one in the picture worth watching".

Ruben resumed stage acting with Gringo, an unusual first play by Sophie Treadwell. Alexander Woollcott said Ruben was "expert and vivid and engaging", but other critics felt the play's faults outweighed the acting. The playwright herself wrote an article praising Ruben's performance, but the production closed January 13, 1923.

The Exile was a romantic comedy written by Sidney Toler, for which Ruben both directed and starred. It opened for a week-long preview on March 5, 1923, at the Montauk Theatre in Brooklyn, with opera singer Eleanor Painter as co-star. Critic Arthur Pollock thought Toler's writing too long on exposition and short of dramatic action. It moved over to Broadway on April 9, 1923, where the reviewer Burns Mantle considered it to have only one exciting scene; audiences agreed and it closed on May 5, 1923.

There followed a six-month hiatus in Ruben's performing career, broken in late 1923 by a one-act drama on the B. F. Keith vaudeville circuit. During February 1924, he produced and staged The Woman Hunter for regional theater, but did not appear in it. He did appear in a series of French-language matinees given at the Gaiety Theatre by Mme. Simone's company during March 1924.

His next performance was on Broadway for a revival of the 1904 melodrama, Leah Kleschna. Upon opening April 21, 1924, the Brooklyn Daily Eagle said "Not all the stars in this resuscitation of Leah Kleschna are entirely familiar with their lines". Despite an all-star cast, it closed May 17, 1924, then went on tour to Boston and Chicago thru June. October 1, 1924, saw Ruben once more on Broadway, in a dramatic fantasy called Bewitched. After just two weeks it switched theaters, but closed for good on October 25 when its producer ran out of money. Ruben's last performing job for the year was also his final motion picture, Salome of the Tenements, for which he had a leading part.

== Stage performances: 1925-1928 ==
Ruben went through a ten-month hiatus of performing from December 1924 thru September 1925. (Note: The cause of this is unknown, but may have to do with his membership in the Actor's Fidelity League. During a threatened strike in August 1924, Actor's Equity had won a closed shop concession from the Producing Managers' Association that eventually choked off membership in the rival league.) He broke the dry spell in late September 1925, taking over the lead in the touring company for The Firebrand when Joseph Schildkraut fell ill. Ruben finished up the tour by November when he started rehearsals for the Theatre Guild production of Merchants of Glory. This opened at the Guild Theatre on December 14, 1925. A cynical satire on war profiteers and sham patriots by Marcel Pagnol and Paul Nivoix, its humor didn't translate well from the original French.

His first radio appearance, a ten-minute interview, occurred on January 4, 1926, over WGBS in New York City. That spring Ruben reprised his portrayal of Oswald Alving in Ghosts, a production of the Actors' Theatre that co-starred Lucile Watson. No sooner had its run finished then he appeared with his wife and sister-in-law in The Two Orphans, a revival of an old melodrama.

In March 1927 Ruben played the lead in Closed Doors, a drama by Mercedes de Acosta. Meant to be a tryout for Broadway, it was shut down by the producer after just a few performances and deferred to later in the season. Suddenly unemployed, the two stars Ruben and Florence Eldridge took to vaudeville with a one-act playlet by Ruben called The Crest of the Wave.

Ruben appeared briefly in a successful gangster melodrama called Speakeasy in late summer 1927, but then had to return to Closed Doors, now renamed Jacob Slovak, when it resumed production in October 1927. Ruben's last major performance as a lead actor was for The Red Robe, a musical version of Under the Red Robe by Stanley J. Weyman, which opened on Broadway during late December 1928.

== Directing: 1929-1943 ==
This period of Ruben's career marked the transition away from acting to directing. From 1929 on his principal occupation would be stage directing, though he did still take on occasional supporting roles. He directed Robert Wilder's Sweet Chariot in 1930.

This period also saw the production of Alice Takat, adapted by Ruben from a Hungarian story by Dezső Szomory, which opened on Broadway on February 10, 1936. Though Ruben had written one-act playlets for vaudeville before, this was his only attempt to handle a larger work. Produced by Ed Wynn, it starred Mady Christians and Russell Hardie. It was a flop, withdrawn after only eight performances, and Ruben settled back to directing.

== Later activities ==
=== Barnard College ===
During the fall of 1943 the "Wigs and Cues" student drama club at Barnard College mounted a production of Christopher Marlowe's Edward II. Ruben was asked by English department head Dr. Minor Latham to direct the student-chosen production, which was performed on December 16–17, 1943 at the college's Brinckerhoff Theatre. The two student leads were Leora Dana as Edward II and Jennifer Howard as Mortimer.

This led to Ruben becoming a part-time lecturer in the English department during the Fall term of 1944, conducting a course called "Dramatic Workshop". He was paired with instructor Marcia Freeman, who handled the course administrative duties. Ruben and Freeman, along with Dr. Latham, auditioned students for that terms dramatic production of Julius Caesar, directed by Ruben and given in December 1944. Ruben left the position in February 1945, to begin preparations for staging productions for the New York City Center Opera.

Ruben returned to lecturing at Barnard for the winter session of 1945-46. He also cast and directed the drama club's production of The Duchess of Malfi in December 1945.

=== Opera staging ===
During 1944, Ruben branched out to staging operas and related musical performances, starting with the Belmont Operetta Company at New York City Center. He did the stage direction for The New Moon, then staged La bohème, La traviata, and Manon Lescaut for the New York City Center Opera's fall season, and Der fliegende Holländer and Faust for its 1945 spring season. Ruben went to the West Coast in spring 1946 to stage The Vagabond King for the Los Angeles Civic Light Opera, and the San Francisco Light Opera Association.

Ruben shared stage direction duties for the Chicago Opera's fall 1946 season. He handled the stage direction for a Broadway musical, Toplitzky of Notre Dame during the late fall of 1946. With spring 1947, Ruben returned to the West Coast to stage The Three Musketeers for both the Los Angeles Civic Light Opera, and the San Francisco Light Opera Association. Ruben returned to San Francisco in 1950 to stage Rose-Marie.

For the New York City Center Opera's 1951 spring season Ruben devised staging for a new work in its repertoire, Manon. For the fall season he created staging for Rigoletto.

=== Last performance ===
Ruben's last performance came in 1956 with the broad comedy The Great Sebastians, which starred Lynn Fontanne and Alfred Lunt. The play opened on January 4, 1956, at the ANTA Theatre, when Ruben was already 71. A Cold War stage version of To Be or Not to Be, it was an audience pleaser. After a month, it moved to the Coronet Theatre where it played through to June 1956.

== Death and remembrance ==
After thirteen years of retirement, Ruben died in University Hospital on April 28, 1969, at the age of 84, though newspapers reported it as 80. The New York Daily News ran a 16-line obituary that concluded with this career highlight: "In 1916, he played in a performance which marked the stage debut of Katherine [sic] Cornell". The New York Times, whose editors had better memories, gave him a two-column article covering his life and career.

== Personal life ==
According to both his Petition for Naturalization (1913) and his Passport Application (1920), Ruben stood 5 ft 7 in (170 cm) and weighed 150 pounds (68 kg), with dark hair and blue eyes. Both documents also give his birth year as 1884, unlike his much later social security file which had 1888.

Ruben married actress Mary Nash on October 19, 1918, at the Church of the Blessed Sacrament. They had met while rehearsing in I.O.U.. Ruben directed and performed with Nash in Thy Name Is Woman during 1920-21. The play was set in Spain; Nash told an interviewer that her husband had travelled in Spain and Italy and knew both languages. A brief article from March 1923 mentioned that the couple lived together with Nash's sister Florence Nash, and that all three supported each others' acting careers. The couple performed together in a 1926 stage play, but this appears to be the last reference to Nash and Ruben associating. The couple eventually divorced.

While teaching at Barnard College in 1944, Ruben was interviewed by a reporter for the school paper, who said he "spoke British", presumably meaning his English followed Received Pronunciation. She also described him at age 60: "...smokes with an amber cigarette holder: wears neat, gentle clothes, horn-rimmed glasses, and uses the bilinguist's rather vivid vocabulary". He told her that he had no hobbies other than work.

Victoria "Torrie" Wehrum (1909-1990), head of the Book Department of Bloomingdale's, and Ruben were married on September 29, 1949, in Manhattan, and remained so at his death in 1969.

== Stage performances ==
Listed by year of first performance, excluding works which he directed only (French-language roles before 1911, and many from 1913–1915, cannot be documented)
Year	Play	Role	Venue	Notes
1911	The Garden of Allah	Batouch	Century Theatre	Ruben's earliest credited performance, his Broadway debut, and his first English-language role.
1912	Le Passant	Street Singer	Hudson Theatre	One-act drama by François Coppée has Ruben as a Florentine street singer who captivates Beverly Sitgreaves. Ruben also gave a reading of Enrage at this one-off matinee program, performed while he was still appearing evenings in The Garden of Allah.
1912	The Garden of Allah	Batouch	Touring Company	The travelling spectacle toured from late August 1912 thru May 1913.
1913	La Vierge folle/Le Passant	Marcel Armoury / Street Singer	Harris Theatre	One-act plays by Bataille and Coppée respectively.
1913	Andromaque		Harris Theatre	Classic tragedy by Jean Racine.
1914	Le Mari Amoureaux des a Femme	Octave D'Ubeville	Belasco Theater (Note: This was in Washington, D.C.)	The then Italian Ambassador to the US, Cusani Confalonieri, had translated this comedy by Giuseppe Giacosa into French.
1914	Days of War	Count Dolga	Vaudeville circuit	One-act drama had Madame Yorska as a dancer pursued by Ruben whom she denounces as a spy.
1914	Le Vieil Homme		Little Theater	Five-act drama of social life by Georges de Porto-Riche.
1916	Through the Ages (Note: The original 1904 play was called Eros i Psyche in Polish.)		Garrick Theatre (Note: This was located in Philadelphia.)	American debut of play by Jerzy Żuławski, starred Madame Yorska and Robert T. Haines, with Florence Short, Roy Hoyer, Ruth Sharpe.
1916	Lover's Luck	Marcel Desroches	Comedy Theatre	Ruben's debut with the Washington Square Players (WSP) was this one-act work by Porto-Riche in English translation.
1916	Another Way Out	Gerard Larue	Comedy Theatre	One-act satire on Greenwich Village social mores by Lawrence Langner played on the same bill as Bushido and Altruism.
1916	Bushido	Masuo	Comedy Theatre	The WSP's most successful production was this extract from a work by Takeda Izumo, designed and staged by Michio Itō.
1916	Altruism		Comedy Theatre	One-act play by Karl Ettlinger was skipped by most reviewers as Bushido ran so long.
1917	The Life of Man	Man	Comedy Theatre	Full length play by Leonid Andreyev was a limited engagement performance for WSP subscribers.
1917	A Private Account	Edward Trielle	Comedy Theatre	One-act play by Georges Courteline, given in English translation, also starred Margaret Mower.
1917	The Poor Fool	Hugo Haist	Comedy Theatre	One-act play by Hermann Bahr, given in English translation, was poorly received by critics.
1917	Ghosts	Oswald Alving	Comedy Theatre	Ruben and Mary Shaw played the leads in this Henrik Ibsen tragedy, which also featured Margaret Mower, T.W. Gibson, and Arthur Hohl.
1917	Madame Sand	Alfred de Musset	Criterion Theatre; Knickerbocker Theatre	Comedy by Philip Moeller, directed by Arthur Hopkins, with sets by Rollo Peters. Starred Mrs. Fiske, with Ferdinand Gottschalk, Olin Field, John Davidson, Walter Kingsford, Owen Meech, and Arthur Cross.
1918	Madame Sand	Alfred de Musset	Touring company	Ruben performed with the tour for two months of engagements.
1918	Romeo and Juliet	Romeo	Criterion Theatre	Laurette Taylor played Juliet in this two-character excerpt from the balcony scene.
1918	The Fine System		Vaudeville circuit	Olive Wyndham co-starred with Ruben in a one-act play by Georges Courteline, in English translation.
1918	I.O.U.	Baron Tori	Touring Company; Belmont Theatre	Stage adaption by Willard Mack and Hector Turnbull of the latter's screenplay for The Cheat. Directed by John Cromwell, it co-starred Mary Nash.
1918	A Marriage of Convenience	Chevalier de Valclos	Touring Company	From a four-act play by Alexandre Dumas, this production starred Henry Miller and Ruth Chatterton.
1919	The Dancer	Bejdan Borivenko	Harris Theatre	Produced by the Shuberts, this play by Edward Locke starred Isabelle Lowe, John Halliday, Effingham Pinto, and Ruben.
1920	Sacred and Profane Love	Emilio Diaz	Morosco Theatre	Four-act play by Arnold Bennett, starred Elsie Ferguson.
1920	Maker of Dreams	Pierrot	Knickerbocker Theatre	One-act play by Oliphant Downs, given as two matinee benefits by the Actors' Fidelity League; with Ruth Chatterton and Howard Kyle.
1920	The Checkerboard	Feodor Masimoff	Previews; 39th Street Theatre	By Frederick and Fanny Hatton, staged by Clifford Brooke, starred Ruben with Donald McDonald, Miriam Sears, Dorothy Smoller, Kate Mayhew.
1920	Thy Name Is Woman	Pedro	Playhouse Theatre	Four-act drama by Carl Schoner and Benjamin F. Glazer, directed by Ruben, and starring him and Mary Nash, with Curtis Cooksey and Edwin Maynard.
1921	Swords	Cannetto	National Theatre	Costume drama by Sidney Howard, staged and produced by Brock Pemberton, starred Clare Eames and Ruben, with Charles Waldron, Raymond Bloomer, Jane Darwell.
1922	Gringo	Tito, el Tuerto	Comedy Theatre	By Sophie Treadwell, staged and produced by Guthrie McClintic, starred Ruben, with Edna Hibbard, Richard Barbee, Edna Walton, Frederick Perry.
1923	The Exile	Jacques Cortot	Montauk Theatre; George M. Cohan Theatre	Costume drama by Sidney Toler, staged by and starring Ruben, co-starring Eleanor Painter, with Etienne Girardot, Marion Abbott, Sydney Riggs, Wallis Clark.
1923	The Greaser	Tito	Vaudville circuit	One-act condensation of Gringo marked Ruben's return to performing after a six-month hiatus.
1924	The Woman Hunter		Lyceum Theater (Note: This was in Paterson, New Jersey.); Shubert Belasco Theater (Note: This was in Washington, D.C.)	Three-act play by Lewis Slodan and James Tracey; produced and staged by Ruben, who did not appear in it. Starred Ruth Shepley, with Charlotte Walker, William Boyd, Saxon Kling.
1924	La Vierge folle	M. De Charence	Gaiety Theatre	One-act play by Henry Bataille, given twice as a matinee. Starring Mme. Simone, Eva La Gallienne, and Ruben, with M. de Rigoult, M. Delaqueriere, Mlle. Tilden.
1924	La Coutouriere de Luneville	M. Rallon	Gaiety Theatre	One-act play by Alfred Savoir, given twice as a matinee. Starred Mme. Simone and Ruben.
1924	Le Passe		Gaiety Theatre	One-act play by Porto-Riche, given twice as a matinee. Starred Mme. Simone and Ruben, with José Delaqueriere, Henry Morrell, Emile Villamin.
1924	Leah Kleschna	Schram	Lyric Theatre	Revival of melodrama by C. M. S. McLellan starred William Faversham, Arnold Daly, Helen Gahagan, Ruben, Arnold Korff, and Lowell Sherman.
1924	Bewitched	Marquis	National Theatre; Jolson Theatre	Dramatic fantasy by Edward Sheldon and Sidney Howard, designed by Lee Simonson, starred Ruben, Florence Eldridge, and Glenn Anders.
1925	The Firebrand	Benvenuto Cellini	Touring Company	Ruben took over the role Joseph Schildkraut had originated on Broadway; starred Ruben, Nana Bryant and Frank Morgan.
1925	Merchants of Glory	Monsieur Denis	Guild Theatre	By Marcel Pagnol and Paul Nivoix, translated by Ralph Roeder, staged by Philip Moeller, starring Augustin Duncan and Ruben, with Helen Westley.
1926	Ghosts	Oswald Alving	Comedy Theatre	Ruben reprised the role at the same theatre from WSP days. Starred Lucile Watson, with Edward Fielding, Hortense Alden, J. M. Kerrigan.
1926	The Two Orphans	Pierre Frouchard	Cosmopolitan Theatre	Ruben played a cripple in this short-lived revival that starred his wife Mary Nash and her sister Florence Nash.
1927	Closed Doors	Jacob Slovak	Werba's Brooklyn Theatre	Drama by Mercedes de Acosta, staged by Edward Goodman, starred Ruben, with Florence Eldridge, Robert Strange, and Kate Morgan.
1927	The Crest of the Wave		Vaudeville circuit	One-act playlet by Ruben starred him and Florence Eldridge.
1927	Speakeasy	Fuzzy Arnold	Cort Theatre	Gangster melodrama, in which Ruben appeared temporarily.
1927	Jacob Slovak	Jacob Slovak	Greenwich Village Theatre	Closed Doors rewrite; staged by James Light, starring Ruben and Miriam Doyle, with Arthur Hughes, Beatrice Moreland, and Robert Abbott.
1928	The Red Robe	Cardinal Richelieu	Shubert Theatre	Based on Under the Red Robe by Stanley J. Weyman, staged by Stanley Logan, it starred Ruben, Walter Woolf, Helen Gilliland, John Goldsworthy.
1931	As You Desire Me	Boffi		
1931	The Cat and the Fiddle	Clement Daudat		
1933	The Drums Begin	Gaston Corday		
1934	Rain from Heaven	Nikolai Jurin		
1936	Matrimony Pfd	Andre Lorre		Ruben staged and performed in this play
1938	Madame Capet	Herman		Ruben directed and performed in this
1943	The Vagabond King	Louis XI		
1956	The Great Sebastians	Karel Cerny	ANTA Theatre; Coronet Theatre	Ruben's last performance was this moderately successful comedy, starring Lynn Fontanne and Alfred Lunt, with Ben Astar, Simon Oakland, Arny Freeman, Joseph Holland, and Eugenia Rawls.

== Filmography ==
Film (by year of first release)
Year	Title	Role	Notes
1914	Lord Chumley		
1915	A Daughter of Earth (Note: Some newspapers from 1915 have the title as A Daughter of the Earth.)	Old Warner's Son	Two-reel Biograph short starred Gretchen Hartman, Alan Hale, Edward Cecil and G. Raymond Nye.
1915	Reapers of the Whirlwind	Charles Howard (Note: IMDb has confused Ruben's role with that of G. Raymond Nye.)	Biograph tragic short, directed by J. Farrell Macdonald, has Charles H. Mailes, Gretchen Hartman, Violet Reid, and G. Raymond Nye.
1915	The Law of Love	Stanley Brentwood	Another Biograph short, this time with Madge Kirby as the forlorn heroine; with Charles H. Mailes, G. Raymond Nye.
1915	Ashes of Inspiration	Adrian West	Biograph short; Ruben is again an artist, his muse being Ilean Hume and his wife Claire McDowell. With Charles H. Mailes, G. Raymond Nye, and Kenneth Davenport.
1915	The Rehearsal	Cecil King	Biograph short; with Madge Kirby, Vera Sisson, and Kate Bruce.
1915	The Worth of a Woman	Barlow	Biograph short; with Vera Sisson, Madge Kirby, and G. Raymond Nye.
1915	His Wife's Story	George Fenmore	This was a Klaw and Erlanger production, perhaps in cooperation with Biograph. With Vera Sisson, G. Raymond Nye, and Charles H. Mailes.
1915	His Hand and Seal	Ed Curwood	A three-reel Biograph-Klaw and Erlanger production, with Vera Sisson, Claretta Clair, Charles H. Mailes.
1915	The Laurel of Tears	Dick Stuart	Another three-reel Biograph film directed by J. Farrell Macdonald. With Vera Sisson, Madge Kirby, G. Raymond Nye, and Charles H. Mailes.
1915	The Chief Inspector		Biograph short, with Vera Sisson, Madge Kirby, G. Raymond Nye, and Charles H. Mailes.
1915	The Eyes of the Soul	Joe Abbott	Biograph short, with Claire McDowell.
1915	Love's Enduring Flames		Biograph short, with Claire McDowell, Alan Hale, Vola Smith, William J. Butler.
1915	His Emergency Wife	Mrs. George Haynes	Ruben plays the imposter in this variation of Charley's Aunt. With Alan Hale, Vola Smith, and William J. Butler.
1916	A Life Chase		Three-reeler, with Louise Vale, Franklin Ritchie, Jack Drumier, Gus Pixley, and Herbert Barrington.
1916	The Iron Will	Lieutenet Szilard	Three-reel Biograph film, with Vera Sisson, G. Raymond Nye, Ivan Christy, Charles H. Mailes, Gretchen Hartman, Jack Mulhall.
1916	What Happened to Peggy		Biograph short directed by Walter Coyle, with Claire McDowell and Vola Smith.
1916	The Indian		Three-reel western, with Claire McDowell and Vola Smith.
1916	Poor Plutocrats		Three-reel drama from story by Maurice Joakins, with Gretchen Hartman, Charles H. Mailes, Jack Mulhall, G. Raymond Nye, and Ivan Christy.
1916	A Grip of Gold		
1916	Alias Jimmie Barton	Jimmie Barton	Biograph short, with Jack Mulhall, Gretchen Hartman, Jack Drumier.
1916	Paths that Crossed		Three-reel drama, with Charles H. Mailes, Adelaide Woods, Claire McDowell, and Vola Smith
1916	The Larrimore Case		Ruben and Charles H. Mailes got carried away during a fight scene and had to be separated by director J. Farrell Macdonald. Three reels, with Vera Sisson and Gretchen Hartman.
1916	Merry Mary		Biograph short, with Vola Smith and Claire McDowell.
1921	The Lying Truth	Extra	While touring Los Angeles in Thy Name Is Woman, Ruben and Mary Nash were offered one-day parts as extras in this film by the director, Nash's friend Marion Fairfax.
1922	The Man from Home (Note: The Wikipedia article for this film contains a media file of the entire movie, perhaps the only online source in which Ruben's acting may be seen today.)	Ribière	Based on a Booth Tarkington work, the exteriors were shot in Italy.
1923	Dark Secrets	Dr. Mohammed Ali	Filmed at Paramount Studio on Long Island during October 1922 with the working title of Black Fury.
1925	Salome of the Tenements	Jakey Solomon	This was filmed in November 1924 at the Famous Players–Lasky studio in Astoria, Queens.
