= Dark Secrets =

1923 film by Victor Fleming

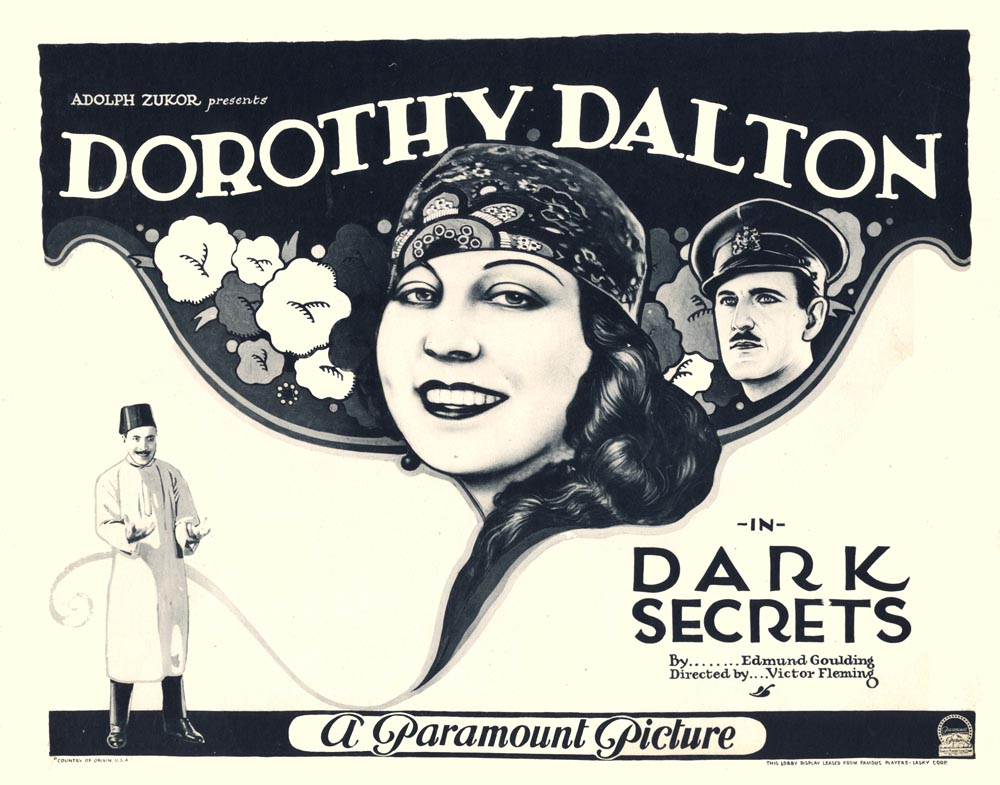
- Lobby card
- Directed by: Victor Fleming
- Written by: Edmund Goulding
- Produced by: Adolph Zukor
- Starring: Dorothy Dalton
- Cinematography: Harold Rosson
- Distributed by: Paramount Pictures
- Release date: January 21, 1923
- Running time: 5 reels (4,337 feet)
- Language: Silent (English intertitles)

Dark Secrets is a 1923 American silent feature drama film directed by Victor Fleming and starring Dorothy Dalton. It is not known whether the film currently survives, which suggests that it is a lost film.

== Synopsis ==
Ruth Rutherford is engaged to Lord Wallington, a British army officer. He presents her with a magnificent horse named "Untameable." Ruth is thrown while riding the steed and receives an injury to the spine which cripples her. Unable to walk, she breaks her engagement to Wallington, who returns to his regiment in Cairo, where he strives to forget Ruth in scenes of wild dissipation. Later Ruth also goes to Cairo, where she is attended by a faithful servant named Biskra. She attracts the attention of a famous surgeon known as Dr. Ali. The latter promised to cure her on condition that she becomes his wife. Ruth unwillingly consents. Dr. Ali cures her. He attempts to attack Ruth and is slain by Biskra. Ruth, controlled by the dead man's power again becomes a cripple. Biskra appears, having broken from the jail in which he was confined for killing Ali and seemingly tries to assassinate Wallington. Ruth leaps from her chair to protect her lover and suddenly discovers that the spell is broken and that she can walk. The lovers are united.

— Exhibitors Trade Review (February 1923)

== Cast ==
- Dorothy Dalton as Ruth Rutherford
- Robert Ellis as Lord Wallington
- José Ruben as Dr. Mohammed Ali
- Ellen Cassidy as Mildred Rice
- Pat Hartigan as Biskra
- Warren Cook as Dr. Case
- Julia Swayne Gordon as Mrs. Rutherford
