= The Man from Home (1922 film) =

1922 film

The Man From Home
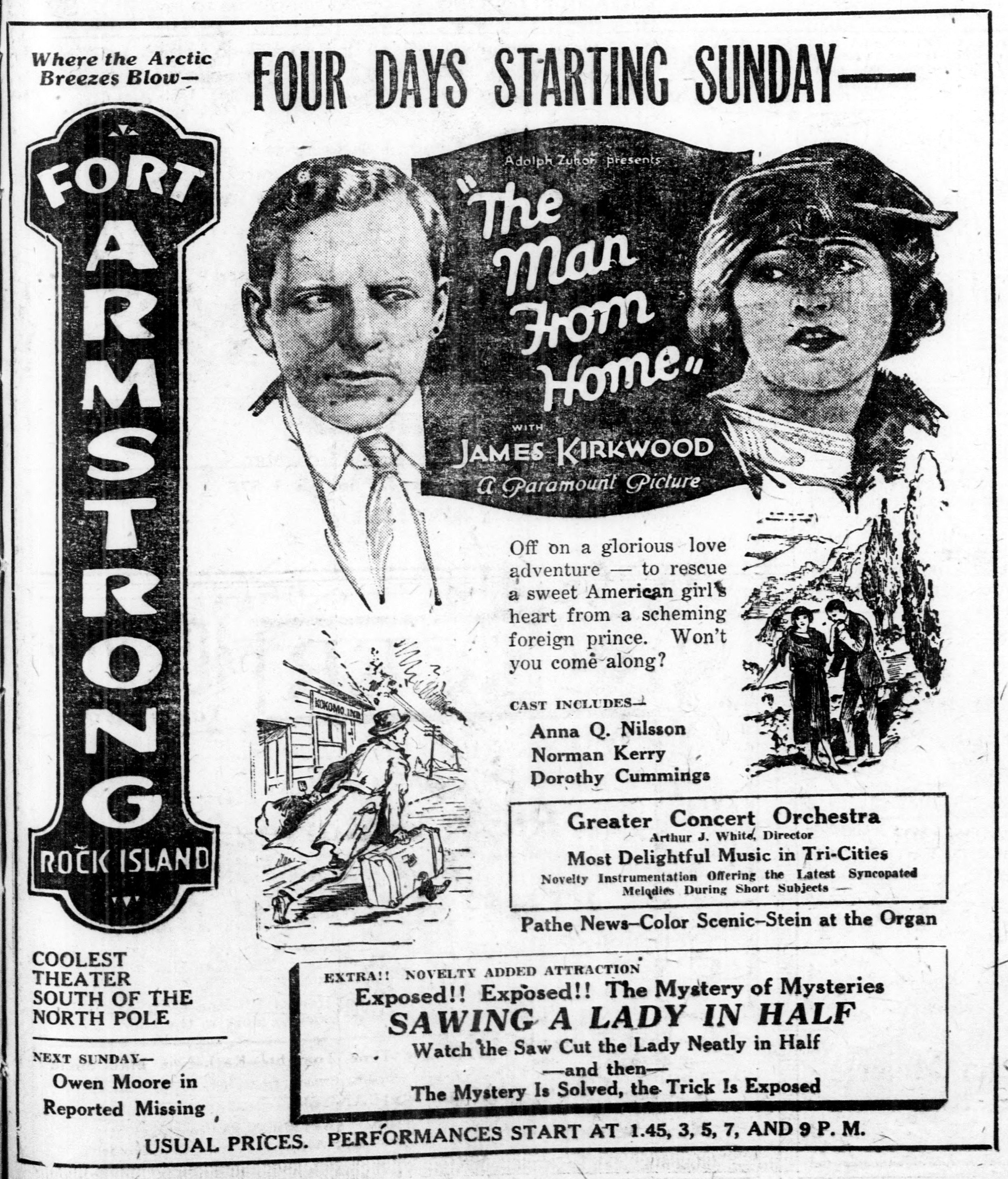
- Newspaper advertisement
- Directed by: George Fitzmaurice
- Written by: Ouida Bergère
- Based on: The Man from Home by Booth Tarkington and Harry Leon Wilson
- Starring: James Kirkwood
- Cinematography: Roy F. Overbaugh
- Distributed by: Famous Players–Lasky British Producers
- Release date: 30 April 1922
- Running time: 70 minutes
- Country: United Kingdom
- Language: Silent (English intertitles)

The Man from Home

The Man From Home is a 1922 British silent drama film directed by George Fitzmaurice, adapted from a play of the same name by Booth Tarkington and Harry Leon Wilson. The story had been filmed before in 1914 by Cecil B. DeMille as The Man From Home. Alfred Hitchcock was credited as a title designer on the 1922 production. The film survives in the Eye Filmmuseum. It was shown publicly in September 2015, possibly for the first time since the 1920s, during the British Silent Film Festival at Leicester.

== Plot ==
As described in a film magazine, Genevieve Granger-Simpson, belle and heiress of her town of Kokomo, Indiana, is given a farewell party on the eve of her departure with her brother Horace to Italy. Her guardian Daniel Forbes Pike is downcast until he learns that Genevieve loves him, and then the farewell is less hard to bear. In Italy Genevieve is dazzled by the attentions of Prince Kinsillo, a member of one of the impoverished fragments of nobility that infest Italy. With his father and sister's aid, he schemes to land the American heiress. Horace is also flattered by the attentions of the Prince, and soon the sister is drawn into an engagement. She writes to Daniel asking for a pittance of $50,000 for her dowry. Daniel realizes he is needed and starts posthaste to Europe. Prince Kinsillo has had an affair with the flower girl Faustina, and she discovers his attentions to the American heiress. Her unsuspecting husband adores her, but she wants only her noble lover. One night, while the husband is gone, she invites the Prince to her home and stabs him, and he kills her. Meanwhile, Daniel has arrived in Italy, helped the King of a neighboring principality who was traveling incognito with some motor trouble, and, not knowing he is consorting with royalty, is the King's guest at the hotel where his wards are staying. Genevieve takes Daniels's interference haughtily until the Prince's true character is finally disclosed through the efforts of her guardian. She acknowledges her love for him and they plan to return to the United States together.

== Cast ==
- James Kirkwood as Daniel Forbes Pike
- Anna Q. Nilsson as Genevieve Granger-Simpson
- Geoffrey Kerr as Horace Granger-Simpson
- Norman Kerry as Prince Kinsillo
- Dorothy Cumming as Princess Sabina
- José Ruben as Ribière
- Annette Benson as Faustina Ribière
- John Miltern as The King
- Edward Dagnall as Father
- Clifford Grey as Secretary to the King

== Production ==
Several scenes were filmed on location in Italy.
