= The Life of Man =

- Original language: Russian
- Written by: Leonid Andreyev
- Subject: Futility of life
- Genre: Symbolist drama

Premiere
- Date: 22 February 1907
- Place: Komissarzhevskaya Theatre

The Life of Man (Russian: Жизнь человека, romanized: Zhizn cheloveka) is a five-act symbolist drama by Leonid Andreyev. Written in September 1906, it premiered on 22 February 1907 at the Komissarzhevskaya Theatre, directed by Vsevolod Meyerkhold. On 12 December 1907 it was performed for the first time at the Moscow Art Theatre, directed by Konstantin Stanislavski and Leopold Sulerzhitsky.

An allegorical play, stylized to some extent after Maeterlinck's "static" plays, it is recognized now as a dramatic summary of several important short stories and novellas by Andreyev of the 1903–1906 period ("The Wall", "The Thought", "The Life of Vasily Fiveysky"), focusing, through a set of abstract and schematic characters and scenes, upon the meaning of human life, or rather the tragic lack of it, epitomized by the mysterious Someone in Grey, the symbol of both disinterested God and desperate human mind.

== Plot summary ==
Surveyed by Someone in Grey (as well as another, anonymous character who is never leaving the stage), Man passes through life (in the grey world where all things are of colour grey) from birth to death as a blind man, unable to see what comes to him next. First he is destitute, then rises to affluence, and finally hits the bottom again. Cursing the anonymous witness to his tribulations, he imagines himself as a hapless warrior who loses everything in his strife against the unfathomable, evil forces. "I am armless now", he exclaims, before the candle (a symbol of life) dies and darkness falls.

== Critical response ==
The original critical response to the play was mixed, even if the Moscow Art Theatre production was met with unanimous acclaim. Especially harsh were the modernist critics who chose to pan it for its allegedly 'reactionary' politics. Avrely in Vesy called the play "the unique, in its own right, collection of banalities." Dmitry Filosofov (in the May 1907 issue of Tovarishch) labeled it "the most reactionary piece of work in the Russian literature to date." Zinaida Gippius (writing under the moniker Anton Krainy) attacked the author personally, describing him as 'uncultured', 'poorly educated', 'pretentious' and thus unequal to the task he'd burdened himself with.

Critics differed in their interpretations of the play's ideas and symbolism. According to Maximilian Voloshin's 1907 review, Someone in Grey should be seen as an amalgam of the world's forces of evil, including the power of the state. Anatoly Lunacharsky saw this figure as the embodiment of the impersonal, absolute Law, outside the realm of good and evil.

Unlike his friend Maxim Gorky who, while praising his rebellious, anti-establishment attitude, still considered Andreyev's outlook be utterly pessimistic, the author himself insisted that his play was life-affirming. "Everybody tells me I am a pessimist. But I think you should play Man as somebody who is very strong, powerful and unwilling to succumb to his destiny," he told (an unspecified) actor, according to Vikenty Veresayev. This interpretation was endorsed by Alexander Blok (who saw Man as "a wonderful sphynx, rather than a mere puppet"), as well as Korney Chukovsky, who praised Blok for his critical review of the play.

D.S. Mirsky in his 1925 essay wrote: "In his symbolic dramas Andreyev is keen to avoid even remote similarities with the real life... They are totally abstract and rhetorical, the distant relatives of the Byron mysteries, seeped in through their Teutonic interpretations, written in tense, lofty, didactic manner... daubed with crude palette of black and red, no overtones allowed. The best of them is, still, The Life of Man; at least the other-worldliness of these howling, spectral characters creates a certain atmosphere. Its success was to some extent justified but to re-read it now is unbearable. [As all his plays, this one] is driven by one single motif, that of death, and void and the futility of all human effort."

== Revivals ==
The Life of Man was given its Broadway debut on January 14, 1917, at the Comedy Theatre with scenic designs by Rollo Peters. Staged by the Washington Square Players, it starred José Ruben as Man, Marjorie Vonnegut as Wife of Man, and Arthur Hohl as He.
