= Charles Rollo Peters =

American painter

- Born: April 10, 1862; San Francisco, California, U.S.
- Died: March 2, 1928 (aged 65); San Francisco, California, U.S.
- Other names: Charles Rollo Peters, Jr.
- Education: Académie Julian; École des Beaux-Arts
- Occupation: Painter
- Spouses: Kathleen "Kitty" Frances Murphy Peters, Constance Mabel Easley
- Children: Rollo Peters; De Witt Peters

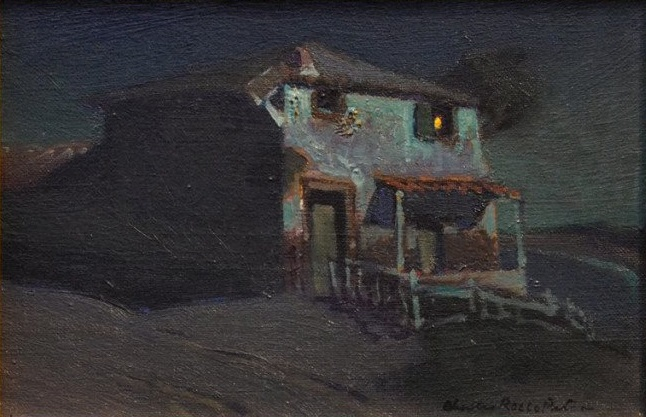
"Monterey Adobe at Night", (1918), oil on canvas

Charles Rollo Peters II (April 10, 1862 – March 2, 1928) was an American oil painter of nocturnes. He was the father of actor and designer Rollo Peters and watercolorist De Witt Peters.

== Early life ==
Peters was born on April 10, 1862, in San Francisco, California. He studied at the Académie Julian and the École des Beaux-Arts in Paris, France; where he was a student of Jean-Léon Gérôme, Gustave Boulanger, and Jules Joseph Lefebvre.

== Career and life ==
In the mid-1890s, Peters opened a studio in Monterey, California, where he became an oil painter of nocturnes scenes of the Carmel Mission, adobes, cypress trees, and the coast. He was a member of the Bohemian Club. According to the San Francisco Examiner, he became "one of the world's greatest artists." For the Los Angeles Times, he was "known internationally for his nocturne studies of Californian and European subjects."

Peters married his first wife, Kathleen "Kitty" Frances Murphy, in 1891. In 1900, he bought 30 acres (12 ha) of land near Monterey, where he built a home and studio, called "Peters Gate," designed by architect Willis Polk. The couple had four children: Charles Rollo Peters III (born in Paris, France, September 25, 1892), Warren (born about 1896), and twins DeWitt Clinton and Kathleen Mary (born in Monterey February 18, 1902). After giving birth to the twins, Mrs. Peters died on March 16, 1902. Her two-year-old daughter caught fire inside the Peters home in Monterey and died December 9, 1904.

Later, Peters resided in Monterey with his second wife, Constance Mabel Easley, who was a painter.

His son, Dewitt Clinton Peters also became a painter. His son, Charles Rollo Peter (commonly known as Rollo Peters), became an actor, theatre director, and scenic designer.

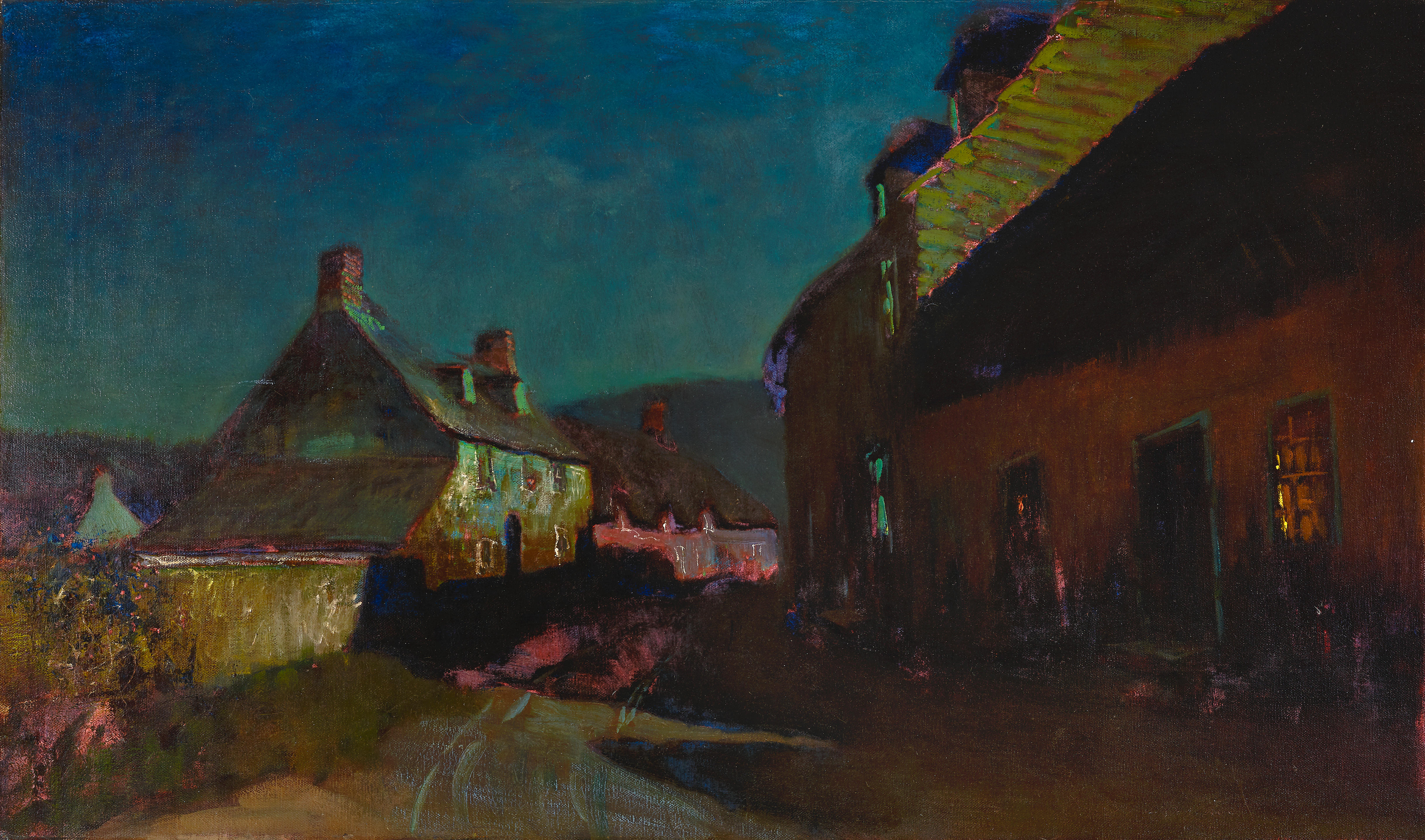
Round Lane, Dorset, painted prior to 1916, oil on canvas, 32 1/2 x 55 in.

== Death ==
Peters died on March 2, 1928, in San Francisco, at age 66. His work is in the permanent collection of the Laguna Art Museum in Laguna Beach, California.
