= The Garden of Allah (play) =

Play by Robert Hichens

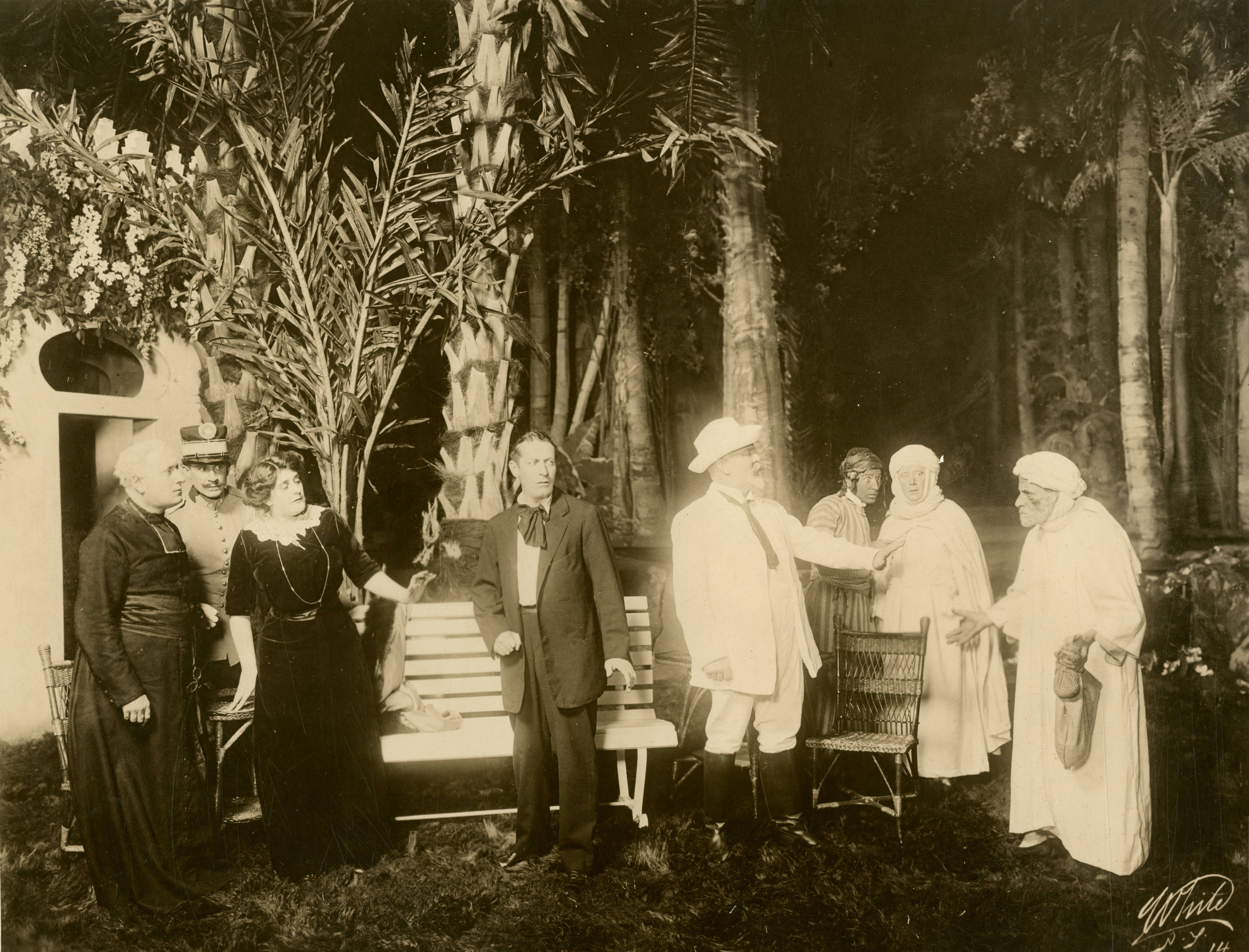
- Photo from Act II
- Original language: English
- Written by: Robert Hichens and Mary Anderson
- Subject: Conflict between spiritual conscience and romantic feelings
- Genre: Drama
- Setting: French Algeria and French Tunis around 1900

Premiere
- Date: October 21, 1911
- Place: Century Theatre
- Directed by: Hugh Ford

The Garden of Allah is a play written by Robert Hichens and Mary Anderson. It was based on Hichens 1904 novel of the same name. It consists of four acts and an epilogue, with a medium-sized speaking cast and slow pacing. The play is concerned with the romance between a wealthy young Englishwoman and a half-Russian, half-English man of mysterious background. The settings are various locales in French Algeria and French Tunis around 1900, particularly the oasis town of Beni-Mora, a fictional name for Biskra. The title stems from an Arabic saying that the desert is the Garden of Allah.

The play was a commercial success, famed for its spectacle, with large numbers of authentic Algerian people, live animals, and complex set designs and effects. However, it was not a dramatic success; several reviewers expressed surprise that a book with so much dramatic potential was winnowed down to a few disjointed scenes. Despite the lack of drama, over 375,000 people saw it during the Broadway run (Oct 1911-May 1912), more than any single play to that date.

== Characters ==
Leads

- Domini Enfilden — Wealthy Englishwoman, a devout Catholic, thirty-two years old and never married.
- Boris Androvsky — Son of a Russian father and English mother, entered Trappist monastery at age 17, but ran away after twenty years devotion.
- Count Anteoni — Italian nobleman, who owns the garden in Beni-Mora.

Supporting

- Father Roubier — Parish priest of Beni-Mora, sympathetic to Domini but wary of Boris.
- Captain De Trevignac — French officer, guest of Count Anteoni.
- Batouch — Arab poet, who acts as Domini's guide and general factotum throughout the play.
- Hadj — Batouch's cousin, also a guide, hired by Boris.
- Suzanne — Domini's maid, played for comedy.
- The Sand Diviner — An Arab seer, who foresees Domini's future in the sands he wears in a bag around his waist.

Featured

- Ouardi — An Arab servant of Domini.
- Sheik — The Arab camel rider in the first scene of the play who answers the call to prayer.
- Mueddin — The muezzin whose call to prayer the Sheik answers in the first scene.
- Garcon — Waiter at the Hôtel du Désert
- Larbi — Gardner to Count Anteoni, who spends most of his time playing a love melody on a flute.
- Irena — Ouled Naïl dancer in Beni-Mora.
- Selima — Ouled Naïl dancer in Beni-Mora.
- Tamouda — Ouled Naïl dancer in Beni-Mora.

== Synopsis ==
Several of the play's nine scenes had no spoken lines as such, but were moving tableaux of life in the desert and the oasis town of Beni-Mora. The play was never published; sources for the synopsis are newspaper reviews.

Act	Scene	Setting	Action
I	1	"The Spirit of the Desert"	A tableau of desert scenery, sand dunes lying under a rising morning sun. A caravan of camels, donkeys, goats, men, women, and children cross a little rise, then exit. They are followed by the Sheik on a camel. The Mueddin gives the call to prayer; the camel kneels down, the Sheik dismounts and crouches to pray.
I	2	The veranda of the Hôtel du Désert	Some Zouaves from the garrison are squabbling in the background, while Domini and Suzanne discuss the rudeness of the stranger at the train station. Domini meets Count Anteoni, who extends an invitation to his garden. Boris appears, and apologizes for his earlier rudeness at the train station. Batouch and Hadj compete for the custom of Domini and Boris.
I	3	The exterior of the dance hall	A tableau of a street scene filled with walk-on parts representing a broad panoply of ethnic groups, occupations, and entertainers.
I	4	The interior of the dance hall	The dancers tempt Boris; the husband of one dancer stabs a spectator, causing a panic, during which Boris rescues Domini.
II	1	The garden of Count Anteoni (Note: The inspiration for this was an actual garden in Biskra, owned by a Frenchman, Count Landon.)	Domini meets Count Anteoni and Captain De Trevignac. Father Roubier is also there, when the Sand Deviner reads the sands for Domini. Both the Father and the Count evidence dislike for Boris. Later, hearing Larbi's love melody, Boris is moved to declare his love for Domini and they are engaged to one another.
III	1	Sandstorm at night in the desert	The couple, now married, are sheltering in their tent. As the storm dies, Boris leaves Domini to hunt gazelle. Count Anteoni and Father Roubier arrive seeking shelter from Domini. Boris returns; Father Roubier takes his leave, with Domini going out with him to say farewell. The Count discovers Boris is Father Antoine, a runaway Trappist monk. Boris draws a revolver and threatens to shoot the Count, but puts it away when Domini returns to the tent. She senses the tense situation between the two men. The Count then also takes his leave.
III	2	Outside the tent in the desert	Boris makes a long confession speech to Domini, revealing his past and why he fled from the monastery. He concludes with his love for her, but she understands that he is still a monk inside.
IV	1	El-Largani Monastery	Domini says farewell to Boris, who re-enters the monastery to complete his vows.
Epilogue	1	The garden of Count Anteoni	Another tableau, some five years later, where Domini sits quietly listening to Larbi's melody while her son Boris plays nearby.

== Original production ==
=== Background ===
Four months after the original novel's publication in October 1904, newspapers reported the stage rights for both the US and UK had been secured by David Belasco. However, the reports were premature; Hichens was initially opposed to seeing this work on the stage. By June 1910 he had reconsidered and was reportedly working on a dramatization. This was done with "an anonymous collaborator" and finished by January 1911.

The collaborator was the long-retired actress Mary Anderson, who convinced Hichens to allow George C. Tyler to buy the dramatic rights for Liebler & Company. Liebler & Company leased the New Theater building on Central Park West in March 1911, in order to stage large-scale productions, the first of which would be The Garden of Allah. The lease agreement included a provision for renaming the theater, as the owners wanted to reuse the "New Theater" name. Tyler selected "Century Theatre" as the new name.

Tyler, with stage director Hugh Ford and set designer Edward A. Morange, met Hichens in Biskra, Algeria during April 1911. They visited the real locales that inspired Hichens, collected material for use in the production, and recruited inhabitants of the area as performers. Liebler & Company stage craftsmen began modifications to the Century theater for handling large productions, which included a massive revolving stage on which two different settings could be placed.

=== Tryouts and revisions ===
There were no out-of-town tryouts, as the production was too complex for easy transportation and required a very large stage area. Instead, the producer Tyler mounted six dress rehearsals/previews at the Century Theatre prior to the premiere. The only documented revision to the production was the decision to raise the curtain earlier, at 8:00 pm, since with set changes the play took over four hours to perform. Within a few weeks after the premiere, the stage crew was able to reduce set change times by forty minutes. The only music heard during the play came from the Arab performers on stage.

=== Cast ===
The complete cast for the play numbered 255, of which 55 were of Arabic or Berber ethnic origin. Many of the remainder were colonial French. They provided atmosphere and handled the menagerie of animals: camels, horses, goats, and donkeys, which were housed in the large basement of the Century Theatre. The named characters below were the only credited performers.

Cast during the original Broadway run
Role	Actor	Dates	Notes
Domini Enfilden	Mary Mannering	Oct 21, 1911 - Mar 16, 1912	Supposedly left the play at the request of her husband. (Note: She was being sued by the Shubert organization for having broken her 1908 three-year contract with them.)
Domini Enfilden	Minna Gale	Mar 18, 1912 - May 18, 1912	
Boris Androvsky	Lewis Waller	Oct 21, 1911 - Mar 02, 1912	Waller left the role to produce and star in revival of Monsieur Beaucaire.
Boris Androvsky	Lee Baker	Mar 04, 1912 - Apr 15, 1912	The producers gave Baker no publicity when he took over the role.
Boris Androvsky	Ian Maclaren	Apr 16, 1912 - Apr 20, 1912	Maclaren replaced Baker for five days due to latter's illness.
Boris Androvsky	Lee Baker	Apr 22, 1912 - May 18, 1912	
Count Anteoni	Eben Plympton	Oct 21, 1911 - Jan 22, 1912	Plympton left the play due to illness.
Count Anteoni	Edward Mawson	Jan 23, 1912 - May 18, 1912	
Father Roubier	Arthur Lewis	Oct 21, 1911 - May 18, 1912	Though he praised Lewis, The New York Times critic said the role was only "incidental".
Captain De Trevignac	Edwin Brandt	Oct 21, 1911 - May 18, 1912	Though he played a French officer, Brandt was from Germany.
Suzanne	Mrs. Alexander Salvini	Oct 21, 1911 - May 18, 1912	She was Maud Dixon, widow of Italian-American actor Alexander Salvini (1861-1896).
Batouch	José Ruben	Oct 21, 1911 - May 18, 1912	The French-born Ruben was playing his first English-language role.
Hadj	Roy Merrill	Oct 21, 1911 - May 18, 1912	
The Sand Deviner	Charles Hayne	Oct 21, 1911 - May 18, 1912	
Ouardi	Franklyn Hurleigh	Oct 21, 1911 - May 18, 1912	
Larbi	Dikyan Seropyan	Oct 21, 1911 - May 18, 1912	The flute-playing Seropyan was actually from Turkey.
Sheik	Keill Ayobb	Oct 21, 1911 - May 18, 1912	
Mueddin	Salum Ayobb	Oct 21, 1911 - May 18, 1912	
Garcon	Alphonse Fabre	Oct 21, 1911 - Dec 22, 1911	Fabre left the play to return to France; his replacement is unknown.
Garcon	Unknown	Dec 23, 1911 - May 18, 1912	
Irena	Faddma	Oct 21, 1911 - May 18, 1912	The character was Kabyle in the book, but Faddma was an Arab from Biskra.
Tamouda	Asmasa	Oct 21, 1911 - May 18, 1912	
Selima	Forcin	Oct 21, 1911 - May 18, 1912	

=== Premiere ===
The public premiere of the production occurred at the Century Theatre with a Saturday matinee on October 21, 1911. Every seat was filled, many with socially prominent people, and speculators were openly selling their tickets despite a recent New York law prohibiting re-sales. Hundreds of people waited outside in the rain, hoping to get tickets. The performance ran from shortly after 2pm to well after 6pm. There were long waits for scene changes, with the curtains remaining down, and quite a few people left early. The crowd was disappointed that neither author appeared on stage to take a bow (both Hitchens and Anderson were backstage) but were gratified that Lewis Waller spoke in their place.

When the first act desert tableau had successfully finished, producer Tyler went backstage and handed out $1000 cash to the crew chiefs for divving up among the carpenters, electricians, and propertymen, an unprecedented act in the theatre.

=== Reception ===
Reviewers were almost unanimous in labelling The Garden of Allah as a picture play or spectacle rather than a true drama. They were full of praise for the settings, effects, and direction of the tableaux scenes, and the much heralded sandstorm in Act III. There was also consensus in regarding Lewis Waller as having played the Boris Androvsky role moderately well, while expressing some disappointment with Mary Mannering as Domini Enfilden. Some critics mentioned Ebon Plympton forgetting his lines as Count Anteoni. Opinions on the other performers varied, with only the young unknown José Ruben drawing praise from multiple critics as the poetic guide Batouch.

=== Closing ===
The Broadway run ended on May 18, 1912, by which date the show had been seen by 375,000 people paying over $500,000.

== National tour ==
Transporting the production required the lease of a special train. When it left Lehigh Station in Jersey City on August 23, 1912, it carried a message in electric lights along the length of the rail cars, spelling out "'The Garden of Allah' Special".

Because the play required a very large stage, only six cities were deemed to have suitable venues. These were the Auditorium Theatre in Chicago, the Cincinnati Music Hall, the Hippodrome Theater (Cleveland, Ohio), the Nixon Theater in Pittsburgh, the original Forrest Theatre in Philadelphia, and the Boston Theatre. However, as the tour wound down from March thru May 1913, the stage crew was able to adjust to some smaller venues.

The Liebler Company's tour kicked off in Chicago on August 31, 1912, at the Auditorium. For the tour, a new scene was inserted between scenes 1 and 2 of Act I; it showed the road from the El-Largani monastery, with Boris Androvsky as Father Antoine speaking to his brother, Dr. Peter Androvsky (this was a new character). Certain credited parts from the original run (the Sheik, Mueddin, Garcon) were now uncredited. There was no specific announcement of these changes; they simply popped up in reviews of the tour and the program guide.

=== Cast ===
Cast during the tour from August 31, 1912, to May 10, 1913
Role	Actor	Dates	Notes
Domini Enfilden	Dorothy Donnelly	Aug 31, 1912 - May 10, 1913	
Boris Androvsky	Lawson Butt	Aug 31, 1912 - May 10, 1913	
Count Anteoni	Arthur Forrest	Aug 31, 1912 - Jan 11, 1913	Forrest decided to retire after the tour played Philadelphia.
Count Anteoni	Charles A. Stevenson	Jan 13, 1912 - May 10, 1913	This was likely the Irish-born actor (1851-1929).
Dr. Peter Androvsky	Sheridan Block	Aug 31, 1912 - May 10, 1913	New character added for the tour, present only in one scene.
Father Roubier	Frank Kingdon	Aug 31, 1912 - May 10, 1913	
Captain De Trevignac	Edwin Brandt	Aug 31, 1912 - May 10, 1913	Brandt was one of the few actors from the original run on the tour.
Suzanne	Florence Johns	Aug 31, 1912 - May 10, 1913	
Batouch	José Ruben	Aug 31, 1912 - May 10, 1913	Ruben had also played this role during the original run.
Hadj	Harry C. Ford	Aug 31, 1912 - May 10, 1913	
The Sand Deviner	J. D. Walsh	Aug 31, 1912 - May 10, 1913	
Ouardi	Franklyn Hurleigh	Aug 31, 1912 - May 10, 1913	Hurleigh was also a holdover from the original tour.
Larbi	Dikyan Seropyan	Aug 31, 1912 - May 10, 1913	Seropyan, the only Turk in the cast, had also been in the Broadway run.
Irena	Faddma	Aug 31, 1912 - May 10, 1913	
Tamouda	Asmasa	Aug 31, 1912 - May 10, 1913	
Selima	Forcin	Aug 31, 1912 - May 10, 1913	

== Adaptions ==
=== Stage ===
A revival of the Hichens and Anderson stage treatment was performed at the Manhattan Opera House during February–March 1918. This followed the touring company storyline, rather than the original Broadway version. It lasted for only 24 performances.

There was another, more successful revival of the Hichens and Anderson treatment, produced by Arthur Collins at the Drury Lane theatre in London, opening June 24, 1920. This followed the original Broadway version rather than the touring company story, in that there was no scene at the El-Largani Monastery nor character of Dr. Androvsky in Act I. But it also excised the epilogue and the opening tableux scene of Act I, launching directly into the Hôtel du Désert veranda scene. It starred Godfrey Tearle, Madge Titheradge, and Basil Gill, with Arthur Lewis reprising his role from the Broadway run.

=== Film ===
Though several American films were made of The Garden of Allah, they all drew on the novel as the basis for their screenplays.
