= Philip Moeller =

American dramatist and director

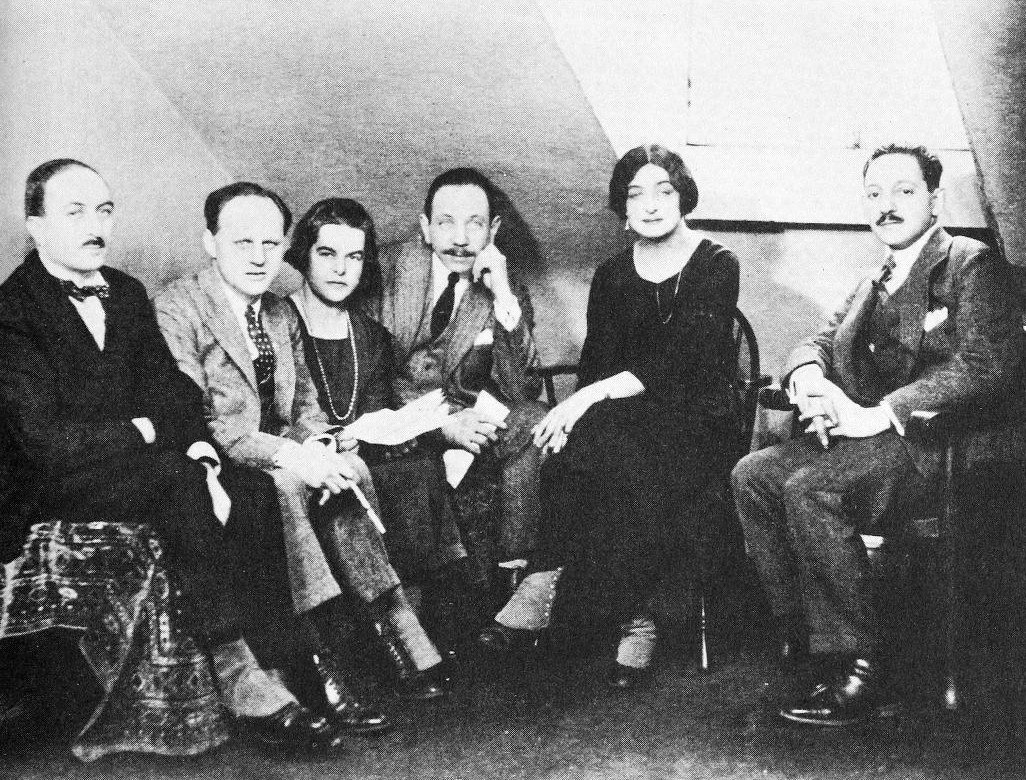
- Theatre Guild Board of Directors (from left): Lawrence Langner, Philip Moeller, Theresa Helburn, Maurice Wertheim, Helen Westley, Lee Simonson (1923)
- Born: August 26, 1880; New York City, New York
- Died: April 26, 1958 (aged 77); New York City, New York
- Education: Columbia University
- Occupations: Playwright, Director
- Years active: 1913-1936

Philip Moeller (26 August 1880 – 26 April 1958) was an American stage producer and director, playwright and screenwriter, born in New York where he helped found the short-lived Washington Square Players and then with Lawrence Langner and Helen Westley founded the Theatre Guild.

== Early years ==
He was born in Manhattan to Frederick K. Moeller and Rachel Phillips Moeller. His father, a naturalized US citizen from Germany, was a dealer in raw silk and wool, while his mother was a New York-born daughter of English immigrants. Moeller was the fourth of five children, one of whom died very young. As a child he lived near the Koster and Bial's Music Hall; during summer, performers were visible through open windows. In his early years the household included three servants, a nurse, and a coachman. Later, the family moved to Central Park West, where they made do with just three servants.

For the hot summer months the family would stay at a seaside hotel near Long Branch, New Jersey. Local papers recorded ten-year-old Philip and his older brother Harry selling tickets for an amateur benefit performance. Two years later he played a court jester for the children's portion of another benefit, and again the following year.

Moeller graduated from Columbia University, where according to Lawrence Langner's memoir he excelled at toe-dancing. His parents had died by February 1903, but Moeller and his three surviving siblings continued living together in the family home for the next seven years.

== The Theater Guild ==
“The essence of the thing in most cases escapes the commentary, the map is never the country, and in a sense-- and a very real sense at that-- words are often the grave in which we bury our thoughts.”
– Philip Moeller on writing about theatre

Lawrence Langner says that the Theater Guild came about by chance, when he ran into Moeller and Helen Westley in the basement cafe of the Brevoort Hotel on December 18, 1918. The three of them had a lively chat at which the idea of a new theater company was put forth. A few days later they met with Rollo Peters at the home of Josephine A. Myers to discuss the concept. The plan they discussed encompassed a wholly professional company, run by an executive committee, to produce only long plays of merit, at a reasonably-priced mid-size theater.

The new organization became public knowledge when it was legally constituted in January 1919. The membership was identified as Moeller, Westley, Langner, Peters, and Myers, with Lee Simonsen, Ralph Roeder, Helen Freeman, and Justus Sheffield. The first Theatre Guild headquarters was at the Washington Square Bookshop. The Guild had already decided not to produce each other's plays, so Moeller's first role would be as assistant director to Rollo Peters.

== Directing career ==
Among plays he directed for the Theatre Guild were:

- R.U.R. (1922)
- The Adding Machine (1923)
- Fata Morgana (1924)
- The Guardsman (1924)
- They Knew What They Wanted (1924)
- Ned McCobb's Daughter (1926)
- The Second Man (1927)
- Strange Interlude (1928)
- Meteor (1929)
- Dynamo (1929)
- Hotel Universe (1930)
- Elizabeth the Queen (1930)
- Mourning Becomes Electra (1931 - its first production)
- Biography by S. N. Behrman (1932)
- Ah, Wilderness! (1933)
- End of Summer (1936)

== Playwright ==
- The Battlefield (1913) presented May 14, 1913 at the Aerial Theatre, on the roof of the New Amsterdam Theatre.
- Two Blind Beggars and One Less Blind: a tragic comedy in one act (1915) Debuted on the second bill of Washington Square Players first season.
- Helena's Husband (1915) one-act play for Washington Square Players on its second seasons opening night 4 October 1915
- The Roadhouse of Arden (1916) Debuted on third bill of the Washington Square Players second season.
- Sisters of Susanna (1916) Debuted on opening night of Washington Square Players third season.
- Madame Sand - a biographical comedy (1917) Debuted at Academy of Music in Baltimore during October 1917.
- Pokey (1917) Debuted on third bill of Washington Square Players fourth season in January 1918.
- Molière (1919) Premiered at the Liberty Theatre on March 17, 1919.
- Sophie - a comedy (1919)
- Caprice - adaptation of three-act play by Austrian writer Sil-Vara (pseudonym of Geza Silberer) in 1929.

== Filmography ==
This filmography is believed to be complete.

- The Age of Innocence (1934) (director)
- Break of Hearts 1935 (director)
