= Madame Sand =

Play by Philip Moeller

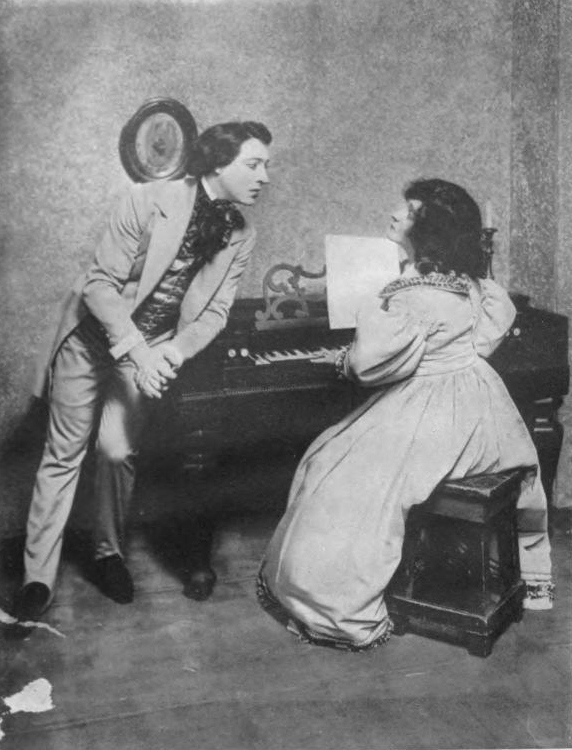
- José Ruben and Mrs. Fiske in Madame Sand
- Original language: English
- Written by: Philip Moeller
- Subject: Episodes in three loves of George Sand
- Genre: Satire

Premiere
- Date: November 19, 1917
- Place: Criterion Theatre
- Directed by: Arthur Hopkins

Madame Sand is a 1917 play written by Philip Moeller, who subtitled it "a biographical comedy". It consists of three acts, with a medium-sized cast and moderate pacing. Most of the play's characters are historical, figures from the Romantic literary and musical world of the 1830s. Each act has only one scene and one setting. The subject is an episodic treatment of three love affairs conducted by George Sand, with Alfred de Musset, Pietro Pagello, and Frédéric Chopin.

The play was long on witty conversations and irony. Intended as mild satire, some critics labelled it as burlesque, while others pointed out the limited appeal of Romantic era writers for modern audiences. "Who reads George Sand anymore?" one critic quoted. Moeller used the characters' own writings as source material, though he wasn't above lifting a phrase from elsewhere and ascribing it to one of his figures. Very much a star vehicle, the play's appeal in actual performance relies on the popularity of the sole lead: in the original US production this was Mrs. Fiske, while in the UK revival it was Mrs. Patrick Campbell.

== Characters ==
Supporting and featured characters are listed in order of appearance within their scope.

Lead

- George Sand.

Supporting

- Mme. de Musset — Alfred and Paul's mother.
- Paul de Musset — Alfred's older brother.
- Buloz — Editor of the Revue des deux Mondes.
- Heinrich Heine.
- Alfred de Musset.
- Dr. Pietro Pagello — Mme. Sand's Italian physician.
- Lucrezia Violente — Pagello's aptly-surnamed mistress.
- Franz Liszt.
- Frédéric Chopin.

Featured

- Rosalie — Maid at Mme. Sand's Paris home.
- Casimir Dudevant — Mme. Sand's estranged husband.
- Mlle. de Fleury — One of three demoiselles at Baron Rothchild's reception for Chopin.
- Mlle. Rolande — Oldest of the three demoiselles, who misrecognizes all the celebrities.
- Mlle. de Latour — Youngest of the three demoiselles, who keeps a diary.
- Lackey — Repeatedly opens the door at the Baron de Rothschild's residence. (Note: A silent part in the published editions of the play, and unmentioned on their Cast of Characters, it was made a credited role during New York tryouts.)

Walk-on

- Guests at the reception of Baron de Rothschild for Chopin.

== Synopsis ==
The complete text of the play, as published in the first edition of 1917, is available on Wikimedia Commons. The summary below is highly condensed for quick reference.

| Act | Scene | Setting | Action |
|---|---|---|---|
| I | 1 | Madame Sand's Paris apartment, 1833. | Paul and Mme. de Musset visit Mme. Sand's apartment, hoping to disuade Alfred from going off with her. Rosalie lets them in, but George Sand and Alfred aren't there yet. Casimir shows up, drunk and looking for a handout. Heine and Buloz arrive next, having been invited to supper. George Sand and Alfred arrive, the former energetic and alive to every moment, which she writes down as fast they occur. Sand has Buloz pay Casimir to send him off, persuades Mme. de Musset that her younger son Alfred is far better off going to Italy with her, and sets Rosalie to getting a cab for the trip. Alfred assures Buloz he and Sand will work on their writings for his Revue. Meanwhile, Heine finally gets fed an omelet by Rosalie.... |
| II | 1 | Madame Sand's apartment in Venice, 1834. | George has tired of Alfred, who lies ill with "sunstroke" from out of a bottle. George now smothers Dr. Pietro Pagello with her amorous declarations, recording them as soon as they are uttered. She rushes out with Pagello to persuade his father to let them run off to the Alps. Paul de Musset enters the apartment. He has brought money from their mother to Alfred, who exclaims his weariness with George and her endless writing. Lucrezia rushes in, confronts Alfred, then George and Pietro when they return. George talks her around, sends her away, then departs with Pietro when Alfred gives them the money to travel. |
| III | 1 | Reception for Chopin at Baron de Rothschild's Paris residence. | Three young demoiselles at their first social evening are excited at the prospect of seeing celebrities. They provide an onstage audience for Buloz, Pagello, and Heine. Pagello is pushed into a waiting room, while Heine and Buloz fret about Lucezia's expected arrival. She has been summoned to Paris by an anonymous letter. Liszt and George arrive, with the latter confessing she sent the letter and passage money, as she has tired of Pagello. Liszt attempts to woo George, but she distracts him, just as she once again talks around Lucrezia, sending her off with Pagello. Alfred arrives with his mother, and they too are sent away. Finally Chopin ceases playing in the reception room, and Liszt goes in to perform. George and Chopin now begin what promises to be a long affair. "How long?" Buloz asks Heine, who replies it doesn't matter because it will all be wonderful copy. |

== Original production ==
=== Background ===
Philip Moeller had written several one-act historical satires for the Washington Square Players during 1915-1916. A theatrical manager asked for a scenario for a full-length commercial work of the same type, but ended up not using it. Moeller then showed the scenario to Arthur Hopkins, who commissioned him to write the play. From his initial reading of the scenario, Hopkins considered it a vehicle for Mrs. Fiske. He sent the completed play to Harrison Fiske, asking him to have his wife read it. Mrs. Fiske liked the play and convinced George C. Tyler to produce it for Klaw and Erlanger, to whom she was then under contract. (Note: Philip Moeller dedicated the published play (Dec 1917): "To Mrs. Fiske for whom the play was written and to Arthur Hopkins, for whom I wrote the play". Mrs. Fiske wrote a foreword, and Hopkins an introduction to the published play.)

Rollo Peters, then working with the Washington Square Players, was hired to design the sets. Hopkins signed José Ruben in June 1917 for the production to be mounted that fall.

=== Tryouts and revisions ===
The first performance of Madame Sand was a benefit for Mercy Hospital in Baltimore. It was held at the Academy of Music on October 29, 1917. Separate reviews in The Baltimore Sun and its evening edition agreed that the production was not a play but an episodic satire. Both reviewers praised Mrs. Fiske's interpretation of George Sand, but mentioned her nervousness and difficulty in making herself understood in the large theatre.

After three days of performances, the production went north to New York, playing one night stands in Poughkeepsie and Ithaca, then a full week at the Star Theater in Buffalo before heading to Broadway. One Buffalo reviewer summed up the local experience: "The comedy is of the intellectual sort and plenty of it last night went right over the footlights and didn't find a resting place in the audience". One change from the Baltimore tryout was the addition of a credited role to program guides for "Lackey", who silently opens doors in the third act. Neither edition of the published play has this role in the Character list.

=== Cast ===
Cast during the tryouts and original Broadway run
| Role | Actor | Dates | Notes |
|---|---|---|---|
| Madame Sand | Mrs. Fiske | Oct 29, 1917 - Jan 12, 1918 | She played the first act in pantalettes and the second in trousers, while smoking cigars. |
| Madame de Musset | Muriel Hope | Oct 29, 1917 - Jan 12, 1918 | |
| Paul de Musset | Harold Hendee | Oct 21, 1917 - Nov 17, 1917 | |
| Paul de Musset | Walter Schellin | Nov 19, 1917 - Jan 12, 1918 | |
| Buloz | Walter Kingsford | Oct 29, 1917 - Jan 12, 1918 | |
| Heinrich Heine | Ferdinand Gottschalk | Oct 29, 1917 - Jan 12, 1918 | |
| Alfred de Musset | José Ruben | Oct 29, 1917 - Jan 12, 1918 | |
| Dr. Pagello | John Davidson | Oct 29, 1917 - Jan 12, 1918 | |
| Lucrezia Violente | Olin Field | Oct 29, 1917 - Jan 12, 1918 | |
| Franz Liszt | Owen Meech | Oct 29, 1917 - Jan 12, 1918 | |
| Frédéric Chopin | Alfred Cross | Oct 29, 1917 - Jan 12, 1918 | Cross not only played the composer, he also played the composer's music. |
| Rosalie | Jean Robb | Oct 29, 1917 - Jan 12, 1918 | Robb used her birth name for billing; she and her husband Robert Strange were members of the WSP. |
| Casimer Dudevant | Ben Lewin | Oct 29, 1917 - Jan 12, 1918 | |
| Mlle. de Fleury | Marjorie Hollis | Oct 29, 1917 - Jan 12, 1918 | |
| Mlle. Rolande | Imogen Fairchild | Oct 29, 1917 - Jan 12, 1918 | |
| Mlle. de Latour | Caroline Kohl | Oct 29, 1917 - Jan 12, 1918 | |
| Lackey | Charles Peyton | Nov 12, 1917 - Jan 12, 1918 | This silent role was credited only during later tryouts and on Broadway. |

=== Premiere ===
Madame Sand premiered at Broadway's Criterion Theatre on November 19, 1917.

=== Reception ===
The reviewer for The New York Times admired the cleverness of the dialogue, but felt that the production amounted to a burlesque in the style of the Washington Street Players. Mrs. Fiske enhanced whatever merit the play had: "There are many bright lines and amusing bits of comedy, but they gained their best effect by her vivid and salient comedy method. Burns Mantle recognized that the play itself would appeal only to "a limited and intellectual public".

Aside from Mrs. Fiske, who wore pants and smoked cigars while in character, José Ruben was the only actor consistently singled out for praise by the Broadway critics. The reviewer for Brooklyn Life said Ruben's acting "is not eclipsed even by that of so great an actress as Mrs. Fiske, and he far surpasses any member of her supporting company".

=== Closing ===
Madame Sand closed at the Knickerbocker Theatre on January 12, 1918.

== Touring company ==
Following Broadway, the play went on tour for two months, starting in Chicago on January 21, 1918. It finished up in Boston on March 9, 1918.

=== Cast ===
Cast during the post Broadway tour of Chicago, Pittsburgh, Brooklyn, and Boston
| Role | Actor | Dates | Notes |
|---|---|---|---|
| Madame Sand | Mrs. Fiske | Jan 22, 1918 - Mar 9, 1918 | |
| Madame de Musset | Muriel Hope | Jan 22, 1918 - Mar 9, 1918 | |
| Paul de Musset | Walter Schellin | Jan 22, 1918 - Mar 9, 1918 | |
| Buloz | William H. St. James | Jan 22, 1918 - Mar 9, 1918 | |
| Heinrich Heine | George Flateau | Jan 22, 1918 - Mar 9, 1918 | |
| Alfred de Musset | José Ruben | Jan 22, 1918 - Mar 9, 1918 | |
| Dr. Pagello | John Davidson | Jan 22, 1918 - Mar 9, 1918 | |
| Lucrezia Violente | Olin Field | Jan 22, 1918 - Mar 9, 1918 | |
| Franz Liszt | Owen Meech | Jan 22, 1918 - Mar 9, 1918 | |
| Frédéric Chopin | Alfred Cross | Jan 22, 1918 - Mar 9, 1918 | |
| Rosalie | Jean Robb | Jan 22, 1918 - Mar 9, 1918 | |
| Casimer Dudevant | Ben Lewin | Jan 22, 1918 - Mar 9, 1918 | |
| Mlle. de Fleury | Marjorie Hollis | Jan 22, 1918 - Mar 9, 1918 | |
| Mlle. Rolande | Imogen Fairchild | Jan 22, 1918 - Mar 9, 1918 | |
| Mlle. de Latour | Caroline Kohl | Jan 22, 1918 - Mar 9, 1918 | |
| Lackey | Charles Peyton | Jan 22, 1918 - Mar 9, 1918 | |

== Adaptions ==
A revival opened in London at the Duke of York's Theatre on June 3, 1920. It starred Mrs. Patrick Campbell as George Sand, with Basil Rathbone as Alfred de Musset, and Frank Cellier as Heine.
