= Rollo Peters =

American actor and director (1892–1967)

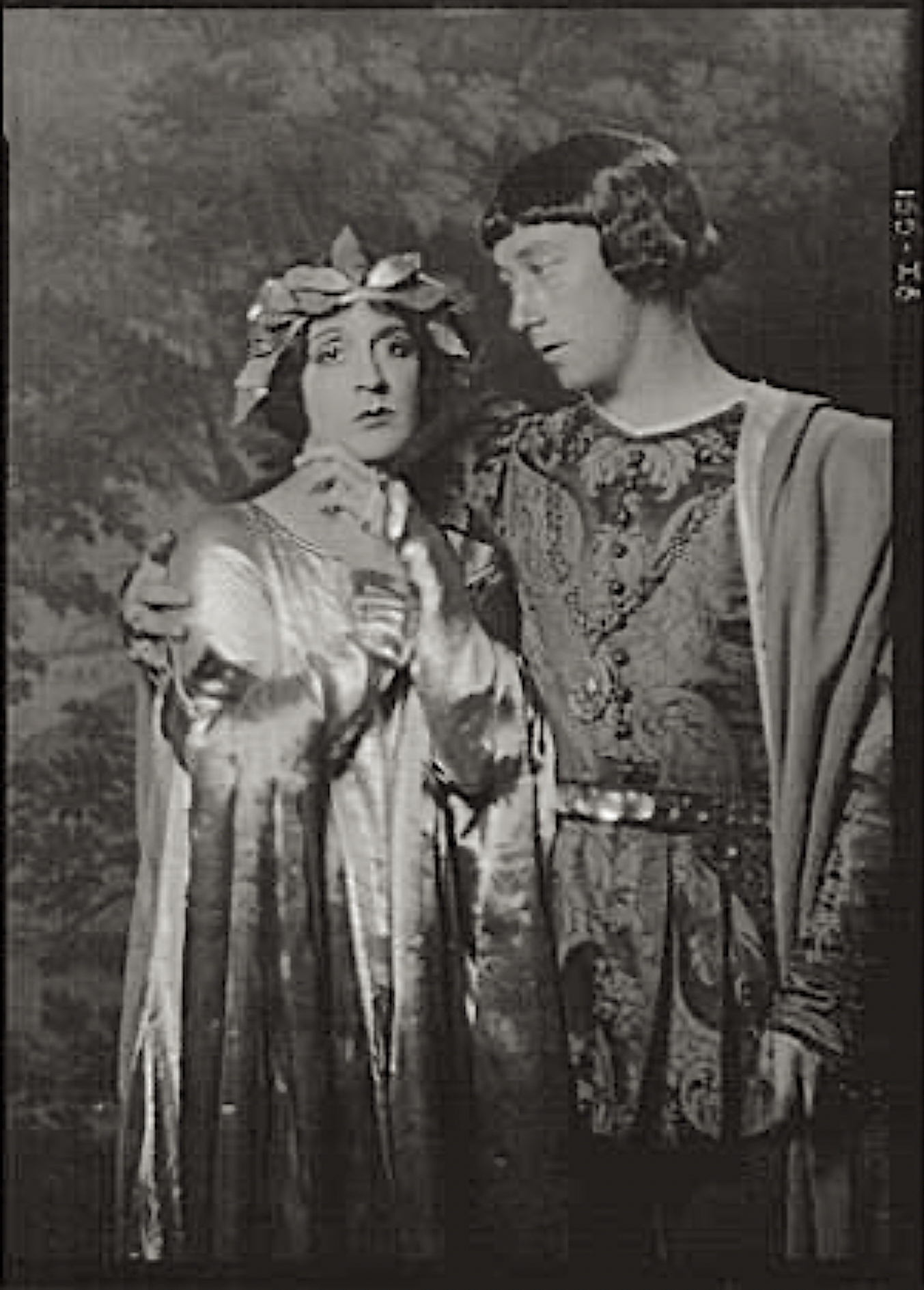
- Jane Cowl as Juliet and Rollo Peters as Romeo in the 1923–1924 Broadway production of Romeo and Juliet
- Born: Charles Rollo Peters III; September 25, 1892; Paris, France
- Died: January 21, 1967 (aged 74); Monterey, California

Charles Rollo Peters III (September 25, 1892 – January 21, 1967) was an American actor, director, painter, and designer of sets and costumes. The son of American painter Charles Rollo Peters II and the brother of painter De Witt Peters, he was born in Paris and raised in Monterey, California. After completing one year at Pacific Grove High School, he moved to Europe with his family where he studied to be an artist in London, Munich, and Paris. He began his career as a portrait artist in New York City after opening a studio there in 1914. His career shifted into work in the theater as a set designer on Broadway for the Washington Square Players in 1917–1918, a company with which he also began his career as an actor in 1918. He rapidly became a sought after actor and designer of both sets and costumes, maintaining concurrent careers in a professional capacity.

In 1918 Peters was a founding member of the Theatre Guild (TG) and served as the organization's first general director for one year. He directed, designed, and starred in the TG's first productions on Broadway, but left after resigning from his position in November 1919. He continued to work regularly on Broadway into the early 1930s. He starred in several productions opposite actress Jane Cowl, including William Shakespeare's Romeo and Juliet (1923, as Romeo) and Antony and Cleopatra (1924, as Antony). His final appearances on Broadway in 1931 were in plays that had transferred to New York from the Westport Country Playhouse (WCP) in Connecticut, a theatre which Rollo played an instrumental role in establishing. Rollo was the interior designer for the WCP when it was converted into a theatre from a barn in the early 1930s.

After 1931, Rollo's performance priorities changed when he began operating a real estate business in Rockland County, New York, which predominantly focused on restoring and redesigning old houses. He no longer worked on Broadway and worked sporadically in regional theaters and on tour. He briefly worked in Hollywood as George Cukor's assistant director in 1935, and as a consultant for the 1936 film Romeo and Juliet. During World War II he gave his final stage performances on tour with the United Service Organizations in England in 1944–1945. In the 1950s he moved back to Monterey, California, where he resumed work as a painter. He died there in 1967 at the age of 74.

== Early life and education ==
The son of American painter Charles Rollo Peters II and his wife Kathleen Murphy Peters, Rollo Peters was born in Paris, France, on September 25, 1892. His grandfather, Charles Rollo Peters I, settled in California in 1849 and was a prominent banker in that state. His great grandfather, John Rogers Peters, had served as an alderman in New York City. At the time of Rollo's birth his father was studying art in France. His Parisian birth was later a topic in a short poem by his friend Edna St. Vincent Millay:

"Look, Edwin! Do you see that boy
Talking to the other boy?
No, over there by those two men–
Wait don't look now—now look again.
No, not the one in navy blue;
That's the one he's talking to.
Sure you see him? Striped pants?
Well he was born in Paris, France."

The Peters family returned to the United States when Rollo was five years old and he was raised in Monterey, California. His younger brother, the watercolor painter De Witt Peters, was born in Monterey in 1902 and later had a significant impact in starting an art movement in Haiti. Rollo attended schools in Monterey, and spent one year at Pacific Grove High School (PGHS) where he was active in the school's drama program. After his first year at PGHS he moved with family to Europe where he initially followed in the footsteps of his father. He worked as a portrait painter after being trained as an artist in London, Munich, and Paris. In the latter city he had an exhibition of fifteen of his portraits which opened on December 15, 1913. In 1914 he returned from Europe to the United States and opened up a studio in New York City.

== Washington Square Players and initial Broadway work ==
Peters developed an interest in scenic design while studying in Europe. In early 1917 he designed the sets for the Washington Square Players's (WSP) productions of The Life of Man and The Death of Tintagiles, after which he was appointed head of the WSP's scenic department in October 1917. Immediately following this he designed the sets for WSP's world premiere production of Eugene O'Neill's In the Zone. Earlier that same year he designed the sets for Ben Iden Payne's production of Grasshopper which played on Broadway at the Garrick Theatre. He also designed sets and appeared as an actor in plays with the Provincetown Players in the 1917–1918 season.

Peters designed the sets for the 1917 Broadway productions of Philip Moeller's Madame Sand at the Criterion Theatre and Alexandre Dumas's The Lady of the Camellias at the Empire Theatre. In 1918 he designed the sets for the Broadway production of Hermann Bahr's Josephine at the Knickerbocker Theatre. He made his Broadway debut as an actor as The young Syrian in the WSP's April 1918 staging of Oscar Wilde's Salome, a production for which he also designed the sets. The following month he began training as a military officer, spending the remainder of the year at the Virginia Military Institute after the dissolution of the WSP. His designs were included in the exhibition "New American Stagecraft" at the Bourgeois Galleries in New York City in 1919.

== Theatre Guild ==
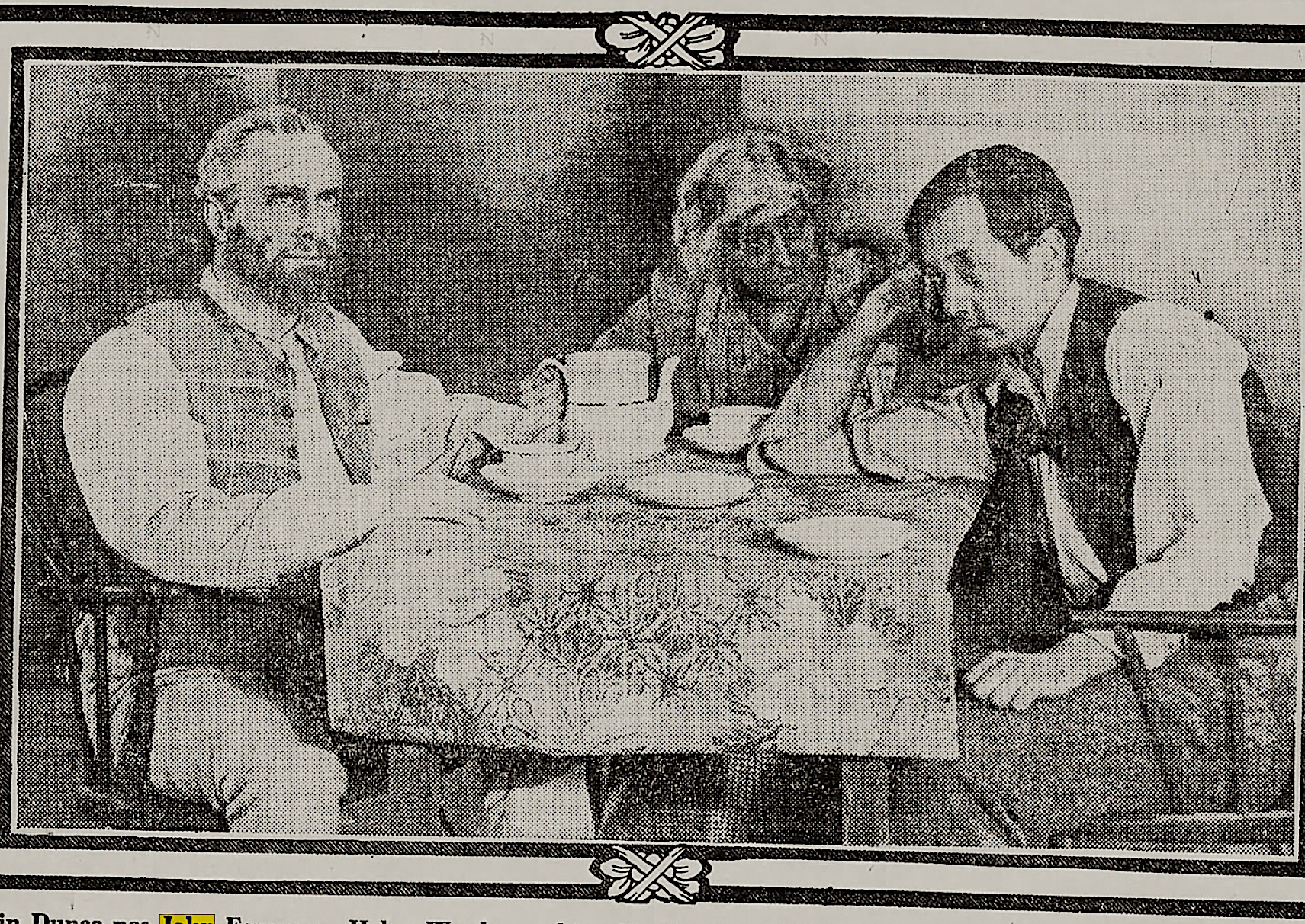
From left to right, actors Augustin Duncan, Helen Westley, and Rollo Peters in the 1919 Broadway production of St. John Ervine's John Ferguson

Peters was a co-founder of the Theatre Guild (TG), a group which formed out of the vestiges of the WSP. Peters was a leading force in the TG from its outset, and according to his obituary in The New York Times was the organization's first general director. Peters remained in this position for only a single year, resigning from his post as director of the TG in November 1919.

In 1919 Peters portrayed the role of Leander in the TG's first production, Jacinto Benavente's The Bonds of Interest, at Broadway's Garrick Theatre. He also designed both the sets and costumes for this production. This was followed by the role of Andrew in St. John Greer Ervine's John Ferguson (1919), a production which became the TG's first hit play on Broadway. As with The Bonds of Interest, Peters was also the designer for this production. He continued in the unusual duo role of actor-designer for many more productions. While often not credited on official programs as the stage director for these shows; newspaper reports refer to him as being responsible for staging the early TG shows.

== Other work on Broadway and the Westport Country Playhouse ==
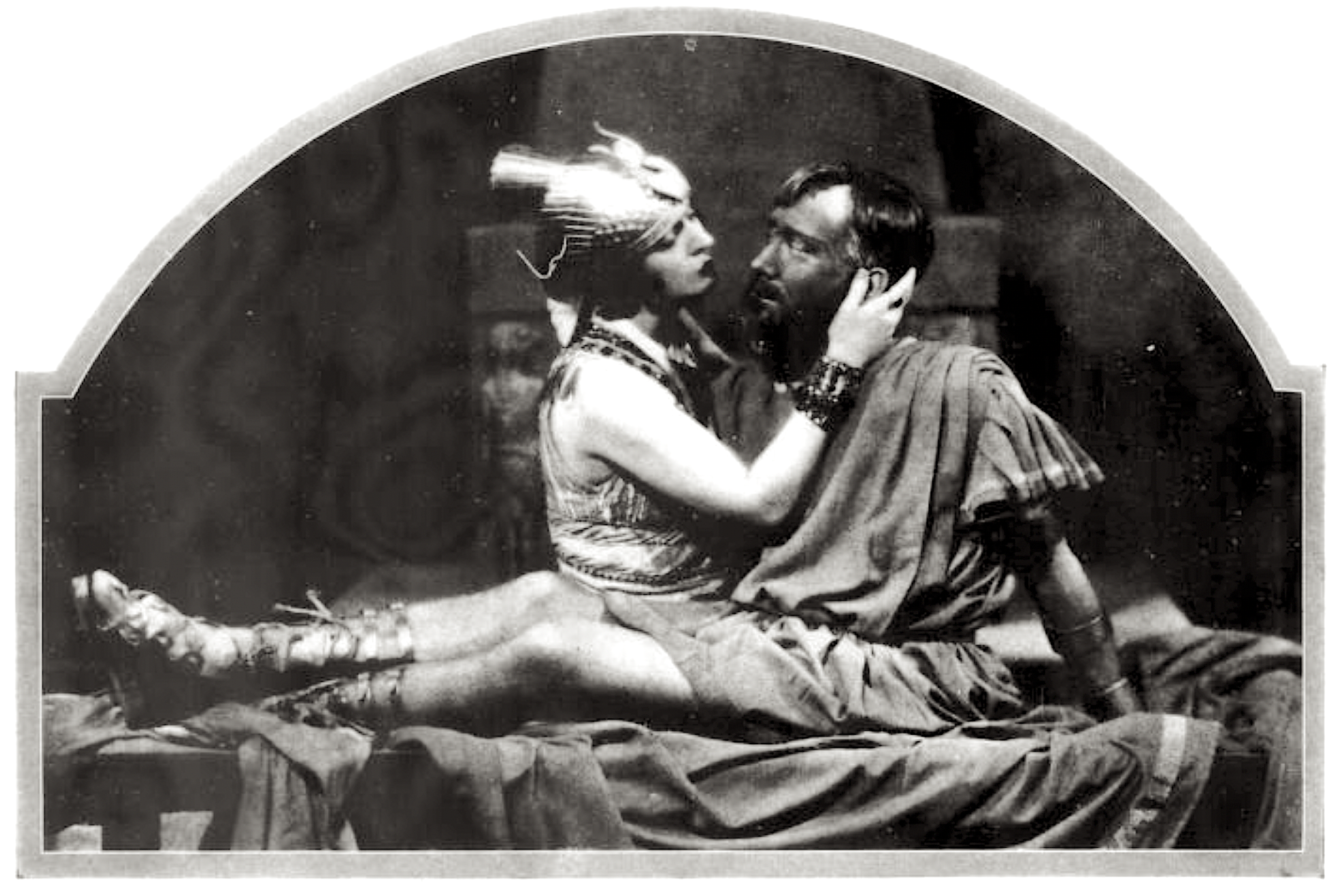
Jane Cowl as Cleopatra and Rollo Peters as Antony in 1924

After leaving the TG Peters continued to work regularly on Broadway into the early 1930s as an actor and designer. He performed in several plays opposite actress Jane Cowl, including portraying Antony to her Cleopatra in the 1924 Broadway revival of William Shakespeare's Antony and Cleopatra. A year earlier he performed with Cowl in two Broadway production: performing the role of Pelléas to her Mélisande in Pelléas and Mélisande and Romeo to her Juliet in Romeo and Juliet. Peters designed the sets for all three of these plays, and in some cases the costumes as well.

Some of Peters's other Broadway credits included Asano in The Faithful (1920), Leonardo in Malvaloca (1922), Count Philippe de Verdois in Stolen Fruit (1925), Karl in The Depth (1925), Mr. Tom Wrench in Trelawny of the "Wells" (1927), John Marstin in Out of the Sea (1927), Capt. Julian Beauclerc in Diplomacy (1928), Captain Jack Absolute in The Rivals (1930), and Johan Tonnesen in Pillars of Society (1931). He created the role of Newland Archer in the premiere of Margaret Ayer Barnes's adaptation of the The Age of Innocence which played at the Empire Theatre in 1928–1929. He also performed the role of Maurice Larned in the premiere of Marya Mannes's Cafe at the Ritz Theatre in 1930.

In 1921 Peters performed in American regional theatres with the Bonstelle Company as Tim Simpkins in Robert Milton's The Charm School and Tom Callahan in Winchell Smith's Turn to the Right. In 1929 he portrayed the title character, Christopher Mahon, in John Millington Synge's The Playboy of the Western World at the Greenwich Theatre in Connecticut. The production then played in Boston before heading to New York where it was forced to close due to racial ill feeling the play's controversial text created within the community leading to fears of a race riot. He was also active as an actor in stock theatre.

In 1931 Peters starred in the first production mounted by the newly created Westport Country Playhouse (WCP), a staging of Dion Boucicault's The Streets of New York. Peters played an instrumental role in assisting Lawrence Langner in the founding of the WCP, including finding the barn that was ultimately transformed into a playhouse. Credited as the designer of the interior of the WCP, he assisted in the physical modification of the barn into a theater. He also designed the sets and costumes for five of the WCP's six first productions, and acted in all six of those plays. Two of the plays in the WCP's first season, The Streets of New York and Ibsen's Pillars of Society transferred to Broadway in 1931 with Peters in the casts.

== Later acting career ==
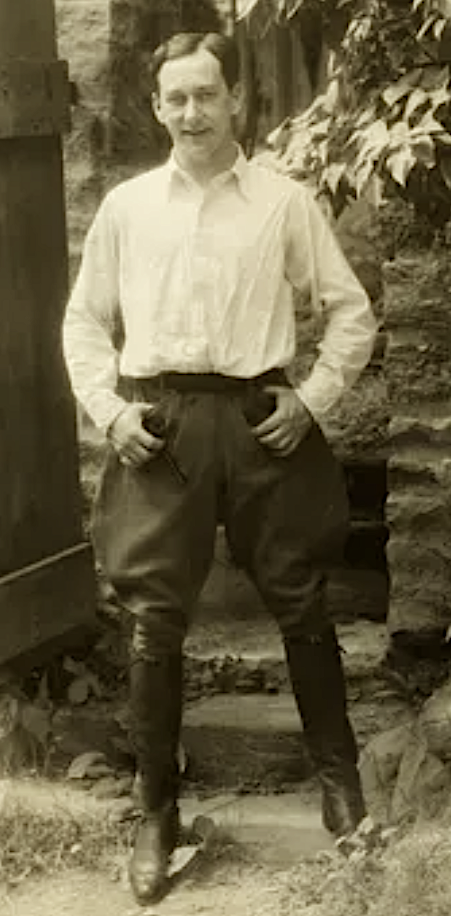
Rollo Peters

After 1931, Peters's acting career, while not inactive, became more sporadic as his interests broadened into other activities. In 1932 he portrayed Norbert in Robert Browning's In a Balcony opposite Annie Russell as the Queen for the inauguration on the newly built Annie Russell Theatre at Rollins College in Florida. Other credits that year included short runs of Sophocles's Electra (as Orestes) at the Academy of Music in Philadelphia; Peter Ibbetson at the Bonstelle Theatre in Detroit (in the title role); and a lead part in a radio drama about the Louisiana Purchase broadcast on the ABC Radio Network program Roses and Drums on August 14, 1932.

In 1933 Peters re-united with Cowl for performances as Armand in Reginald Lawrence and C. R. Avery's stage adaptation of The Lady of the Camellias at the University of Michigan's Lydia Mendelssohn Theatre and the Tremont Theatre in Boston. That same year they performed for a radio broadcast of the balcony scene from Romeo and Juliet. In October 1933 he starred in a production of Dodie Smith's Autumn Crocus in Detroit, a production which he subsequently toured with in 1933–1934, which included a run at the Studebaker Theater in Chicago. In April 1934 he appeared as David Linden in a new production of The Shining Hour at the Drury Lane Theatre in Louisville, Kentucky, a role he repeated the following month in Ann Arbor and again in Philadelphia in 1935. In July 1934 he directed a production of Melchior Lengyel's The Sparrow at the John Drew Memorial Theater in East Hampton, New York.

On October 8, 1934, Peters portrayed Paul Ebony in the United States premiere of Noël Coward's Home Chat at the Majestic Theatre in Brooklyn. He subsequently toured in this production to Philadelphia. In 1936 he toured the United States as Petruchio in a production of The Taming of the Shrew with actress Peggy Wood as Katherine, a work they first performed together at the Hearst Greek Theatre (HGT) in San Francisco in July 1935 in a production directed and designed by Peters. Peters also directed, designed, and starred in a production of Seán O'Casey's Within the Gates at the HGT in 1935.

In 1938 Peters assisted his cousin Warde Tatum (known professionally as Warde Donovan) in obtaining his first role on the New York stage. Warde later married comedian Phyllis Diller. During World War II Rollo was active as a performer with the United Service Organizations, notably touring England as Charles Condomine in Blithe Spirit in USO camp shows in 1944–1945. The USO tour marked the end of his stage career.

== Later life and career ==
Following his experience transforming a barn into the WCP, Peters took an interest in restoring and remodeling old mansions in Rockland County, New York, and also designed and built some new homes as an architect. He created a real estate business based out of the town of Nyack which was active from as early as 1933 into the 1940s. His brother De Witt also worked with him in the early years of this real estate business. In 1935 he worked in Hollywood as an assistant director to George Cukor, and worked as an advisor on the 1936 film Romeo and Juliet.

Sometime in the 1950s Peters relocated permanently to California. The last years of life he lived in Monterey where he once again resumed painting and lectured at the University of California, Santa Barbara. In 1965 an exhibition of his work was given at the Tantamount Theater.

Rollo Peters died in Monterey, California, on January 21, 1967.

== Incomplete list of theatre credits ==
=== Broadway ===
Year	Title	Playwright	Scenic designer	Costume designer	Theatre director	Actor	Role	Venue	Notes	Ref.
1917	The Life of Man	Leonid Andreyev	Yes	No	No	No	N/A	Comedy Theatre	Washington Square Players production	
1917	The Death of Tintagiles	Maurice Maeterlinck	Yes	No	No	No	N/A	Comedy Theatre	Washington Square Players production	
1917	The Little Man	John Galsworthy	Yes	No	No	No	N/A	Maxine Elliott's Theatre		
1917	Grasshopper	Padraic Colum; Mrs. F.E. Washburn-Freund	Yes	Yes	No	No	N/A	Garrick Theatre	Based on a play by Eduard von Keyserling	
1917	In the Zone	Eugene O'Neill	Yes	No	No	No	N/A	Comedy Theatre	Washington Square Players production	
1917	Madame Sand	Philip Moeller	Yes	Yes	No	No	N/A	Criterion Theatre		
1917	The Lady of the Camellias	Alexandre Dumas	Yes	Yes	No	No	N/A	Empire Theatre		
1918	Josephine	Hermann Bahr	Yes	Yes	No	No	N/A	Knickerbocker Theatre		
1918	Salome	Oscar Wilde	Yes	No	No	Yes	The young Syrian	Comedy Theatre	Washington Square Players; Broadway debut as actor	
1919	The Bonds of Interest	Jacinto Benavente	Yes	Yes	Yes	Yes	Leander	Garrick Theatre	First production of the Theatre Guild	
1919	Moliere	Philip Moeller	No	Yes	No	No	N/A	Liberty Theatre		
1919	John Ferguson	St. John Greer Ervine	Yes	Yes	Yes	Yes	Andrew	Garrick Theatre	Theatre Guild production; some sources refer to Peters as producer and director of this show although he was not officially credited as such	
1919	The Faithful	John Masefield	No	No	Maybe	Yes	Asano	Garrick Theatre	Theatre Guild production; while not officially credited as director, newspapers reported that Peters was responsible for staging the TG productions at this time. Lee Simonson was the designer for this show.	
1919	Palmy Days	Augustus Thomas	Yes	No	No	No	N/A	Playhouse Theatre		
1919	One Night in Rome	J. Hartley Manners	Yes	No	No	No	N/A	Criterion Theatre		
1920	The Prince and the Pauper	Amélie Rives	Yes	Yes	No	No	N/A	Booth Theatre	Adapted from the novel by Mark Twain	
1920	Youth	Max Halbe	Yes	No	No	No	N/A	Greenwich Village Theatre		
1921	The Varying Shore	Zoe Akins	No	Yes	No	Yes	Richard; John Garrison	Hudson Theatre		
1922	Malvaloca	Jacob S. Fassett	No	No	No	Yes	Leonardo	48th Street Theatre	Based on the play Malvaloca by Joaquín Álvarez Quintero and Serafín Álvarez Quintero.	
1922	Dolly Jordan	B. Iden Payne	Yes	Yes	No	No	N/A	Daly's 63rd Street Theatre		
1923	Romeo and Juliet	William Shakespeare	Yes	No	No	Yes	Romeo	Henry Miller's Theatre		
1923	Pelléas and Mélisande	Maurice Maeterlinck	Yes	Yes	No	Yes	Pelléas	Times Square Theatre		
1924	Antony and Cleopatra	William Shakespeare	Yes	Yes	No	Yes	Antony	Lyceum Theatre		
1925	The Depths	Hans Mueller	Yes	No	No	Yes	Karl	Broadhurst Theatre		
1925	The Taming of the Shrew	William Shakespeare	Yes	Yes	No	Yes	Petrucchio	Klaw Theatre		
1925	Stolen Fruit	Dario Niccodemi	No	No	No	Yes	Count Philippe de Verdois	Eltinge 42nd Street Theatre		
1927	Trelawny of the "Wells"	Arthur Wing Pinero	No	No	No	Yes	Mr. Tom Wrench	New Amsterdam Theatre		
1927	Out of the Sea	Don Marquis	Yes	No	No	Yes	John Marstin	Eltinge 42nd Street Theatre		
1928	Diplomacy	Victorien Sardou	No	No	No	Yes	Capt. Julian Beauclerc	Erlanger's Theatre		
1928	Diversion	John Van Druten	Yes	No	No	No	N/A	49th Street Theatre		
1928	The Age of Innocence	Margaret Ayer Barnes	No	No	No	Yes	Newland Archer	Empire Theatre		
1930	The Rivals	Richard Brinsley Sheridan	No	No	No	Yes	Captain Jack Absolute	Erlanger's Theatre		
1930	Cafe	Marya Mannes	No	No	No	Yes	Maurice Larned	Ritz Theatre		
1931	The Streets of New York, or Poverty is No Crime	Dion Boucicault	Yes	Yes	No	Yes	Mark Livingstone	48th Street Theatre	Transferred from the Westport Country Playhouse where Peters designed all of the plays during this season with the exception of As You Like It.	
1931	Pillars of Society	Henrik Ibsen	Yes	Yes	No	Yes	48th Street Theatre	Johan Tonnesen	Transferred from the Westport Country Playhouse where Peters designed all of the plays during this season with the exception of As You Like It.	

=== Off-Broadway ===
Year	Title	Playwright	Scenic designer	Costume designer	Actor	Role	Venue	Notes	Ref.
1919	Guibor	Anna Sprague MacDonald	Unknown	Unknown	Yes	Aubin	Neighborhood Playhouse	Based on a 14th century French mystery play	
1920	Mixed Marriage	St. John Greer Ervine	Unknown	Unknown	Yes	Kugh Rainey	Bramhall Playhouse		

=== West End ===
Year	Title	Playwright	Scenic designer	Costume designer	Theatre director	Actor	Role	Venue	Notes	Ref.
1920	One Night in Rome	J. Hartley Manners	Yes	No	No	No	N/A	Garrick Theatre		
