= Lee Simonson =

American painter

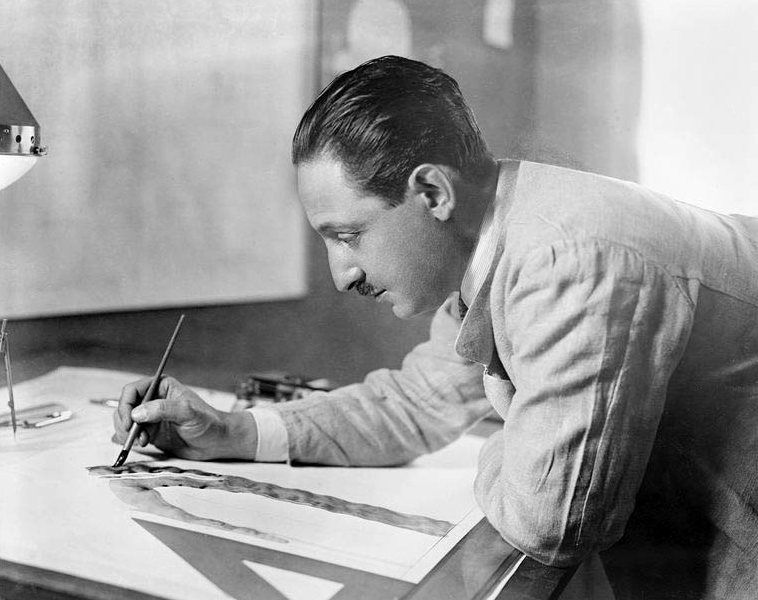
Lee Simonson in 1931

Lee Simonson (June 26, 1888, New York City – January 23, 1967, Yonkers) was an American architect painter, stage setting designer.

He acted as a stage set designer for the Washington Square Players (1915–1917). When it became the Theatre Guild in 1919, he became a stage setting staff of the theater. He graduated from Harvard College in 1909.

== Literary works ==
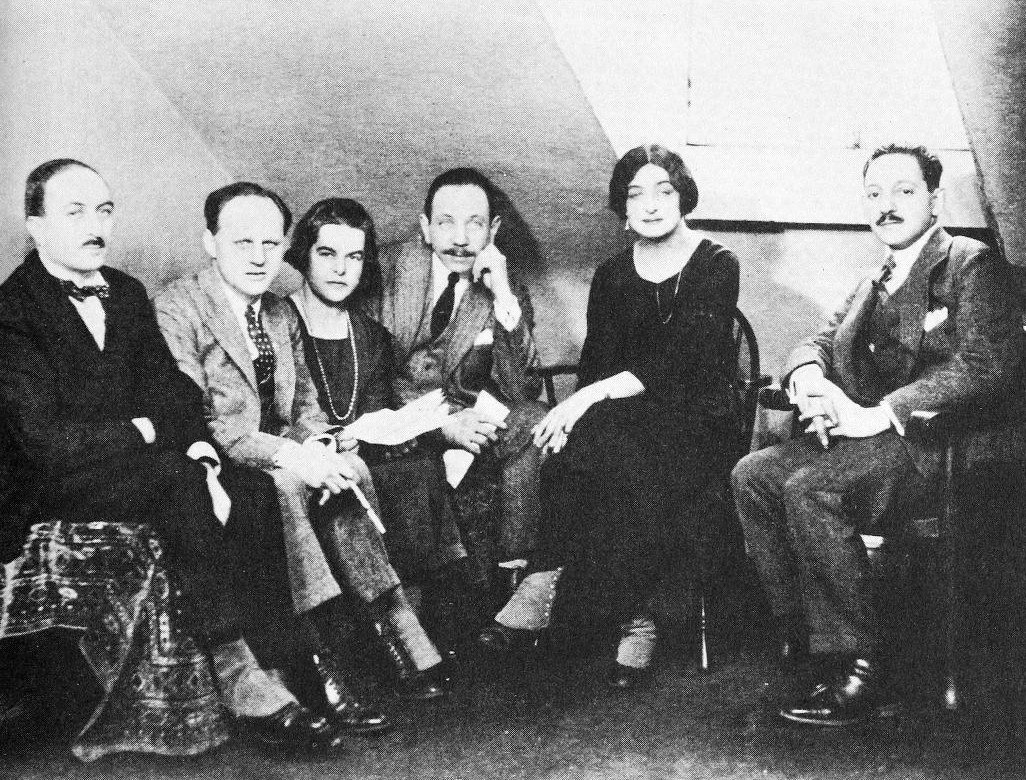
The board of directors of the Theatre Guild (from left): Lawrence Langner, Philip Moeller, Theresa Helburn, Maurice Wertheim, Helen Westley, Lee Simonson (1923)

- “Skyscrapers for Art Museums” The American Mercury, August 1927, pages 399-404
- "Minor Prophecies" New York, Harcourt and Brace, 1927
- "The Stage Is Set", New York, Dover Publications, 1932
- (with Theodore Komisarjevsky): "Settings and Costumes of the Modern Stage" New York Studio Productions, 1933
- Isaacs, Edith J.R., editor: "Architecture for the New Theater" Lee Simonson: "Theater Planning" New York Theater Arts, 1935
- Part of a lifetime: Drawings and Designs 1919-1940, Duell, Sloan and Pearce, New York 1943
- The Art of Scenic Design; A Pictorial Analysis of Stage Setting and its relation to Theatrical Production, 1950

== Exhibitions ==
- "Modern American Design in Metal" Newark Museum March 19 - April 18, 1929 included Simonson, Donald Deskey and William Zorach
- "International Exhibition of Theater Art", Museum of Modern Art, January 15- February 25, 1934, more than 700 drawings and models from 14 countries. After the MoMA venue, the exhibition traveled to Worcester, Providence, Pittsburgh, St. Louis, Chicago and Buffalo
- Harvard Contemporary Art Society 1932, exhibition included Simonson, Bel Geddes, Robert Jones, Monsine, Ornslegger
