= Three Wise Fools =

Three Wise Fools is the title of two films, both based on the 1918 Broadway play of the same name by Austin Strong:

- Three Wise Fools (1923 film), directed by King Vidor
- Three Wise Fools (1946 film), starring Margaret O'Brien
