= Half Angel =

Half Angel may refer to:

- Half Angel (1951 film), a Technicolor comedy film
- Half Angel (1936 film), an American comedy film
