= Fata Morgana (play) =

1915 play by Ernest Vajda

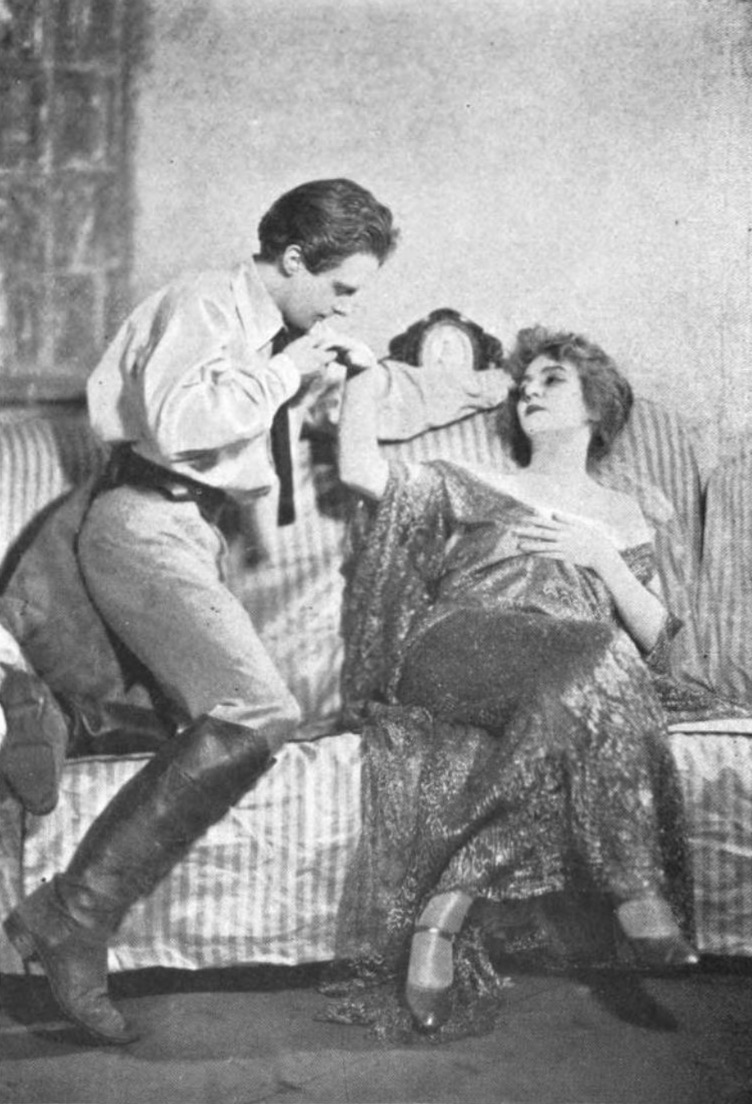
- Morgan Farley and Emily Stevens
- Original title: A délibáb
- Original language: Hungarian
- Written by: Ernest Vajda
- First publication: 1924 (English translation)
- Subject: Disillusionment in romance
- Genre: Comedy
- Setting: A country house on the Puszta during late July 1906

Premiere
- Date: March 3, 1924
- Place: Garrick Theatre
- Directed by: Philip Moeller
- Original run: 255 performances

Fata Morgana is an American adaptation of the 1915 Hungarian play A délibáb (The Mirage) by Ernest Vajda. The English translation was done by James L. A. Burrell and Philip Moeller during 1923-1924. It is a comedy in three acts with a single setting, and fifteen speaking parts. The action of the play takes place over three days time in late July 1906. The story concerns an idealistic young man, led on by a sophisticated married woman. The adapted title is Italian idiom for a mirage, which sometimes occur on the Puszta where the story takes place, and an allusion to the nature of the romantic encounter.

The play was first produced in America by the Theatre Guild, staged by Philip Moeller, with sets and costumes by Lee Simonson. Fata Morgana starred Emily Stevens and Morgan Farley, with Josephine Hull, William Ingersoll, and Helen Westley. It premiered on Broadway in early March 1924, where it ran through October, for 255 performances.

Fata Morgana had a brief revival on Broadway in December 1931, starring Douglass Montgomery.

== Characters ==
Characters are listed in order of appearance within their scope. Most names were anglicized for the American adaptation.

Lead

- George Peredy is 18, a dark-haired handsome college student, an idealist, home for the summer.
- Mathilde Fay is 28, the beautiful, exciting and insincere wife of a Budapest attorney, who calls her Tila.

Supporting

- Anna Peredy is George's mother, who locks every door in the house when she leaves.
- Peredy is George's elderly father, stern and easily put out, who dresses in black.
- Rosalie is a widowed cousin of the Peredy's; she and her daughter live in cities. (Note: They travel from one relative to another, dependent on family ties for support. It is now the Peredy's turn, to Rosalie's chagrin, for she dislikes the country.)
- Gabriel Fay is 50, Mathilde's husband, a cousin of Peredy; he is an attorney and city councilor.

Featured

- Annie Peredy is 16, George's younger sister, a conniver.
- Peter is the Peredy's old coachman, a respectful retainer unafraid of his master.
- Blazy is another elderly provincial, dressed in black.
- Mrs. Blazy is a relative of Mrs. Peredy.
- Therese Blazy is 17, a bit plump, the Blazy daughter.
- Charly Blazy is 19, the Blazy son, an academic disappointment and would-be roue.
- Katherine is the Peredy's maid of all work, treated more like family than a servant. (Note: Emro Joseph Gergely, in 1947 a professor at Chestnut Hill College, wrote that this treatment was part of the American adaptation. The original Hungarian play had the servants being pushed and slapped by their masters.)
- Henry is the Blazy's coachman, a peculiar young man whose proximity alarms Katherine.
- Franciska is Rosalie's ungainly daughter, never able to decide on which dress to wear.

== Synopsis ==
The play takes place on a small estate on the Puszta. Aside from the Peredy country house and outbuildings, there is only a train station nearby, unmanned after the last train leaves. The published play gives the dates of the month in the scene settings, and the days of the week in internal dialogue, establishing the year as 1906, which fits the known circumstances of the play's writing.

Act I (The living room of the Peredy house. About 7pm on Thursday, July 26.) George studies at a table; he is in disgrace. He failed his graduation exam in June, and must retake it. Worse, he has been gone for two days without telling anyone. His father, worried about trouble with Slovaks across the river, had forbidden him to visit it. Though urged by his mother and Annie, George refuses to apologize, and so will stay home while the others go to the Anna Ball in a nearby city. Peter urges everyone to hurry up or they will miss the last train. Anna locks all the doors in the house, (Note: Gergely explains that this was typical Hungarian practice for that time and place.) except for George's bedroom. Alone, George hears the family dogs barking and a frantic cry at the front door. He calls off the dogs and admits a beautiful woman. Mathilde Fay got off the train on the wrong side and missed the family, so she walked to the only house in sight. There is no transport until tomorrow; she and George are in a delicate situation. The doors are all locked, only the living room and George's bedroom are accessible. George admires this beautiful mirage the Puszta has delivered. They talk for a long time, learning about one another. Facing a night of boredom, Mathilde goes to work on George, feigning chaste behavior but actually enticing the naive young man. He is besotted; she sends him to his bedroom to sleep, but follows a moment later, closing the door. (Curtain)

Act II (Same as Act I. About 8pm on Friday, July 27.) The family returned by train at 5pm from the city. Peredy and Peter have fetched cousin Gabriel from the city, where he was delayed on business. Gabriel teases Mathilde about being bored on the Puszta, but she exclaims the wonder of the mirage, which George showed her earlier that day. Gabriel now entices her with a long-promised trip to Ostend and an emerald ring she covets, made possible by his latest deal. Mathilde becomes excited, but George speaks up, saying Mathilda wishes to stay here. The others laugh, thinking it a joke, but when George is alone with Gabriel he becomes belligerent. He demands Gabriel divorce Mathilde, who he now calls his fiancée. Astonished then angered, Gabriel calls for Mathilde. She stuns George by denying any affair between them; she cries then faints, none of which impresses Gabriel. He continues to roar at her until Rosalie intervenes. Peredy puts a stop to any further quarrel, locking George in his room. (Curtain)

Act III (Same as Act I. Morning of Saturday, July 28.) Rosalie has taken Mathilde's side against Gabriel; she is looking ahead to her next billet. George, let out of his room in early morning, works in the barn with his father. Mathilde stammers an apology to Anna, who understands what has happened, but does not speak of it. She grants permission for Mathilde to speak once more with George. Mathilde is frantic to know how much George has revealed, but is reassured when he denies revealing "their secret". (Note: That is, that they had slept together, which the play never explicitly states.) She begs George to recant and apologize to Gabriel. Already disillusioned, George humiliates himself before Gabriel, who is weak and deluded enough to believe George's confession of heat-induced madness and Mathilde's innocence. When Mathilde tries to thank George and suggests a future liaison, he rebuffs her. His father, understanding the sacrifice George made, offers permission for him to go hunting by the river or take a trip to the city. George declines both, saying he must study; he sits down at the table with his books. (Curtain)

== Original production ==
=== Background ===
Ernest Vajda wrote A délibáb in 1915, while still living in Austria-Hungary. It had been in his thoughts for some years, a reflection of his own first romance. Although he grew up in Pápa and Komárno, Vajda spent summer vacations with a student friend whose family lived on the Puszta, and so became acquainted with life there. Unable to get A délibáb performed in Budapest, where his earlier plays had been failures, it received its first production in neutral Denmark, which Vajda only learned about after the Armistice.

According to Lawrence Langner, the play came to the attention of the Theatre Guild board through some of their younger actors, a group who later performed in The Garrick Gaieties. They would "rehearse experimental plays on the Garrick stage at night after the regular play was over, and show their plays when ready to the Guild Board. One of these was Fata Morgana which we afterwards produced". However, Philip Moeller, a Theatre Guild board member, (Note: Moeller and fellow founding board members Helen Westley and Lee Simonson were later ousted from the Theatre Guild board by Lawrence Langner and Theresa Helburn..) had worked with James L. A. Burrell to produce the English language translation which those younger actors used. (Note: Philip Moeller wrote to Emro Joseph Gergely in September 1939, that his recollection was he and Burrell had worked from an intermediate German translation, and not the original Hungarian.)

The first public mention of the production came in January 1924, when the Theatre Guild announced Fata Morgana was going into rehearsal in early February. Soon after Emily Stevens was reported to be the female lead, with Morgan Farley as the male lead. The full cast was announced by mid-February 1924, with Philip Moeller directing and Lee Simonson doing scenic design.

=== Cast ===
Cast for the Broadway run.
| Role | Actor | Dates | Notes and sources |
|---|---|---|---|
| George Peredy | Morgan Farley | Mar 03, 1924 - Oct 11, 1924 | |
| Mathilde Fay | Emily Stevens | Mar 03, 1924 - Oct 11, 1924 | Stevens was reportedly a moody actress who once ignored an Act II cue. (Note: Lawrence Langner said she swung between upbeat and tragic moods, and while in the latter once went to her dressing room instead of waiting for her cue. While Morgan Farley and Orlando Daly prolonged their characters' argument on stage, Josephine Hull raced to Stevens dressing room, only to find her stark naked and lighting a cigarette. Hull hurried Stevens into costume and dragged her on stage.) |
| Anna Peredy | Josephine Hull | Mar 03, 1924 - Oct 11, 1924 | |
| Peredy | William Ingersoll | Mar 03, 1924 - Oct 11, 1924 | |
| Rosalie | Helen Westley | Mar 03, 1924 - Oct 11, 1924 | |
| Gabriel Fay | Orlando Daly | Mar 03, 1924 - Oct 11, 1924 | |
| Annie Peredy | Patricia Barclay | Mar 03, 1924 - Oct 11, 1924 | |
| Peter | James Jolley | Mar 03, 1924 - Oct 11, 1924 | Jolley was stage manager for the production, and also imitated dogs barking offstage for Act I. |
| Blazy | Charles Cheltenham | Mar 03, 1924 - Oct 11, 1924 | |
| Mrs. Blazy | Armina Marshall | Mar 03, 1924 - Oct 11, 1924 | Marshall married Theatre Guild producer Lawrence Langner in 1925, and would later become a Guild director. |
| Therese Blazy | Aline Berry | Mar 03, 1924 - May 31, 1924 | Berry left to take care of an invalid mother. |
| Therese Blazy | Carolyn Hancock | Jun 02, 1924 - Oct 11, 1924 | Hancock was the Theatre Guild's technical director. |
| Charly Blazy | Paul E. Martin | Mar 03, 1924 - Oct 11, 1924 | Martin was a former halfback from St. Johns Prep performing in his first Broadway play. |
| Katherine | Edith Meiser | Mar 03, 1924 - Oct 11, 1924 | She replaced Blanche Yurka as the lead in Man and the Masses for one night. (Note: Blanche Yurka was taken ill before a performance, so Edith Meiser took the complex part without a rehearsal, while her own small role in Fata Morgana was played by Barbara Wilson, a bit player from Saint Joan. All three plays were Theatre Guild productions.) |
| Henry | Sterling Holloway | Mar 03, 1924 - Oct 11, 1924 | |
| Franciska | Helen Sheridan | Mar 03, 1924 - Oct 11, 1924 | |

=== Broadway premiere and reception ===
“But it is true stuff mostly and vastly humorous. It has the bite of satire and the fling of farce. And back of it is the tragedy of youth struggling to grasp its first completely disillusioning experience.”
– Burns Mantle on Fata Morgana

Fata Morgana had its Broadway premiere at the Garrick Theatre on Monday, March 3, 1924. It displaced the Theatre Guild's three-month old production of Saint Joan by George Bernard Shaw, which moved to the Empire Theatre that same day. The critic for The Brooklyn Daily Eagle said the Theatre Guild had "demonstrated its good taste in selection" of this work, which "tumbles from comedy to tragedy and back". While noting the fine performance of Emily Stevens, they judged "the play belongs, and rightfully, to Morgan Farley as George". Josephine Hull, William Ingersoll, Helen Westley, and Edith Meiser were also cited for performing excellence. Burns Mantle also thought Farley had outshone Emily Stevens, his "half comic love tragedy" character having the sympathetic advantage over her insincere sophisticate. John Corbin likened the youth George to Adonis, stressing his idealistic passion versus the "sensual caprice" of Mathilde as Venus, which Corbin felt might defy "Anglo-Saxon understanding". He praised Morgan Farley's performance as the "derisible yet heroic juvenile", and also those of Josephine Hull and Helen Westley.

Heywood Broun said Fata Morgana was "one of the peaks in a season already mountainous", and fell somewhere between Seventeen and The Awakening of Spring in its depiction of adolescent love. He expressed the conventional opinion that "Mr. Farley rather took the play away from Emily Stevens", ascribing it to her less sympathetic character. Stark Young, writing in The New Republic, was the only critic to esteem Emily Stevens' Mathilde over Morgan Farley's George. Young felt the play was good but not great, and praised it for remaining true to life in that it avoided suicide and violence in its resolution, and suggested the protagonist would recover from his disillusionment.

Professor Emro Joseph Gergely, writing in 1947 about the English translation of A délibáb by James L. A. Burrell and Philip Moeller, said "The high praise given the American adaptation for its faithful adherence to the original is justified, for most of the native elements are retained."

=== Changes of venue ===
To make way for a new Theatre Guild production, Man and the Masses by Ernst Toller, the Fata Morgana company moved over to the Lyceum Theatre starting on Monday, April 14, 1924. The occasion was publicized as "Hungarian Night", with Hungarian societies of New York in attendance. Bela Lugosi was master of ceremonies, with Willy Pogany and Lajos Bíró as official hosts.

Man and the Masses closed after four weeks, but it was Saint Joan that moved back to the Garrick Theatre first. Fata Morgana continued at the Lyceum Theatre until Monday, July 21, 1924, when it returned to the Garrick.

=== Broadway closing ===
Fata Morgana closed at the Garrick Theatre on Saturday, October 11, 1924, after 255 performances. (Note: There were 251 performances according to the New York Daily News feature "The Golden Dozen" as of Thursday morning, October 9, 1924, with four performances remaining to be played that final week.)

== Revival ==
Fata Morgana was revived on Broadway at the Royale Theatre starting Friday, December 25, 1931. Produced by Jimmie Cooper, it was staged by James Jolley, who also reprised his role as Peter. The production starred Douglass Montgomery as George Peredy, with Ara Gerald as Mathilde Fay, and William Ingersoll also reprising his role as Peredy, the boy's father. The production received a dismal review from The Brooklyn Daily Times. It closed on Saturday, January 16, 1932, after a three week run.

== Bibliography ==
- Ernest Vajda, translated by James L. A. Burrell and Philip Moeller. Fata Morgana (Mirage): A Comedy in Three Acts. Doubleday, Page & Company, 1924. Contains an essay, "A Producer's Problem" by Philip Moeller, on staging the play, and "An Introduction" by James L. A. Burrell, summarizing Vajda's life and career up to early 1924.
- Emro Joseph Gergely. Hungarian Drama in New York: American Adaptations, 1908-1940. University of Pennsylvania Press, 1947.
- Lawrence Langner. The Magic Curtain. E. P. Dutton & Company, 1951.
