= William Ingersoll (actor) =

American actor (1860–1936)

- Born: October 9, 1860; Lafayette, Indiana, U.S.
- Died: May 5, 1936 (aged 75); Hollywood, California, U.S.
- Occupations: Stage performer; actor; film actor
- Years active: 1880s–1930s
- Style: Musical theatre; musical film; drawing room play; comedy

William Ingersoll (October 9, 1860 – May 5, 1936) was an American actor on stage, in musical theatre and in film. During a career spanning over five decades, he played more than 800 roles on stage. After performing in his first silent motion picture in 1920, he appeared in a handful of "talkies" in the 1930s, playing mainly character roles such as doctors, judges and a police commissioner.

== Early life ==
William Ingersoll was born in Lafayette, Indiana to a physician father, in a family that had never produced any actors; most of his relatives were shocked when, as a boy, he considered acting as a career, on the suggestion of his elder brother. He studied mining engineering at the Colorado School of Mines in Denver after graduating from Purdue University, where he made such an impression in The Pirates of Penzance that friends urged him to become an actor.

== Career ==
Ingersoll joined the Boston Museum Company in 1882, where he remained for five years. In the beginning, he divided his time between acting and supporting the company as a backstage hand and general utility man, eventually making his first professional appearance as a fully fledged actor in 1885. He performed with Marie Wainwright in Twelfth Night at Palmer's Theatre in New York and went on tour with her for three seasons; she rated Ingersoll as "the best leading man on the American stage."

In 1894, Ingersoll joined the summer stock theatre company that James F. Neill and R.L. Giffen had organized at the Manhattan Beach, Denver. In September of the same year, he joined the first winter stock company that Neill and Giffen also organized at the Lyceum Theatre, Denver. When T. Daniel Frawley—who had placed another company in Salt Lake City in December 1894—later purchased the Neill-Giffen interests and moved the organization to San Francisco, Ingersoll remained on the roster of the combined Denver and Salt Lake City company.

Ingersoll then married and left the stage, but resumed his acting career after his wife's death. He first joined the Nat Goodwin Company, with whom he performed in In Mizzoura when it opened at the Baldwin Theatre in San Francisco in June 1896; immediately after the play closed, the whole company sailed to Australia on June 25. Ingersoll remained with the Goodwin company for a period that included four seasons in Australia. In addition to performing with the Nat Goodwin company, Ingersoll played in the supporting companies of Mary Shaw, William H. Crane, Marie Cahill and Charles Richman.

He played leading parts at the Grand Opera House in Pittsburgh, Pennsylvania, and at the Chestnut Street Theatre in Philadelphia, Pennsylvania. He acted in many roles as a visiting star in Columbus, Cincinnati, at the Elitch Theatre in Denver, Colorado, and in Washington, D.C., Providence, Rhode Island, Richmond, Virginia, Salt Lake City, and on Broadway, among many others. He performed with stars of the period, such as Margaret Maher, Ethel Barrymore, Mrs. Fiske, and William DeWolf Hopper. In 1928–1929, he played in Brothers at the 48th Street Theatre in New York, learning his part perfectly in two days, one of the instances of his exceptional memory; this was the 821st he had learned.

After appearing on stage for 55 years and trying his hand in a silent film in 1920, he progressed into sound films in the 1930s, and one of his final talkies was Little Lord Fauntleroy (1936), in which he played the role of the Doctor.

== Personal life ==
At the time of his death in 1936, Ingersoll was married to Mabel Tate, and they had a daughter, Mrs Ira Minnick.

== Memberships ==
Ingersoll was elected to The Lambs Theatre Club in 1893, and was also a member of The Players Club and of the council of the Actors' Equity Association.

== Selected works ==
=== Stage ===
In the table below, all theatres are located in New York, NY, except where indicated.

Title	Role	Theatre	Opening date	Closing date	# of perf.	Ref.
In Mizzoura	(Unknown)	Baldwin Theatre, San Francisco	June ??, 1896	June ??, 1896	N/A	
An American Citizen	Egerton Brown	Knickerbocker Theatre	October 11, 1897	(Unknown)	N/A	
Innocent as a Lamb	(Unknown)	Columbia Theater, Washington, D.C.	July 10, 1898	(Unknown)	N/A	
Nathan Hale	Guy Fitzroy	Knickerbocker Theatre	January 2, 1899	(Unknown)	N/A	
El Capitan	Scaramba (Note: J.P. Wearing indicates that the role of Scaramba was shared between Ingersoll and Melville Stewart (Wearing 2013, p. 421), although the available sources do not provide precise dates for when Ingersoll left the West End production of El Capitan to join the cast of Peter Stuyvesant at the Wallack's Theatre on October 2, 1899.)	Lyric Theatre, London	July 10, 1899	October 28, 1899	154	
El Capitan	Scaramba	Comedy Theatre, London	October 30, 1899	December 9, 1899	154	
Peter Stuyvesant	(Unknown)	Wallack's Theatre	October 2, 1899	October ??, 1899	28	
A Rich Man's Son	(Unknown)	Wallack's Theatre	October 21, 1899	November 22, 1899	36	
Home Folks	(Unknown)	Olympia Theatre	December 26, 1904	January 1, 1905	34	
Moonshine	Plunger Dawson	Liberty Theatre	October 30, 1905	December 2, 1905	53	
Moonshine	Plunger Dawson	Majestic Theatre	December 25, 1905	January 6, 1906	53	
Gallops	Charlie Galloway	Garrick Theatre	February 12, 1906	April 1, 1906	81	
The Builders	Roger Grant	Astor Theatre	May 20, 1907	June 1, 1907	16	
A Social Pirate	The Pirate	Orpheum Players	March 24, 1912	March 31, 1912	N/A	
Tante	(Unknown)	Empire Theatre	October 28, 1913	January 1, 1914	79	
So Much for So Much	(Unknown)	Longacre Theatre	December 2, 1914	December 31, 1914	30	
Experience	Experience	Manhattan Opera House	January 22, 1918	February 9, 1918	23	
Over Here	(Unknown)	Fulton Theatre	September 10, 1918	September 30, 1918	23	
Three Wise Fools	Judge James Trumbull	Criterion Theatre	October 31, 1918	August 1, 1919	316	
The Ouija Board	Henry Annixter	Bijou Theatre	March 29, 1920	May 1, 1920	64	
The Half Moon	John Copley Adams	Liberty Theatre	November 1, 1920	December 11, 1920	48	
Alias Jimmy Valentine	Robert Fay, Lieut. Gov. of New York	Gaiety Theatre	December 8, 1921	January 1, 1922	46	
The Charlatan	Mason Talbot	Times Square Theatre	April 24, 1922	June 17, 1922	61	
Lights Out	Mr. Peyton	Vanderbilt Theatre	August 17, 1922	August 26, 1922	12	
It Is the Law	Theodore Cummings	Ritz Theatre	November 29, 1922	March 1, 1923	125	
Thumbs Down	Judge Richard Fowler	49th Street Theatre	August 6, 1923	August 31, 1923	24	
Queen Victoria	Lord Palmerston	48th Street Theatre	November 15, 1923	December 1, 1923	44	
Fata Morgana	George's Father	Garrick Theatre	March 3, 1924	October 11, 1924	120	
The Devil Within	Doctor Armstrong	Hudson Theatre	March 16, 1925	April 4, 1925	24	
The Goat Song	Gospodar Jevrem Vesilie, Scavenger	Guild Theatre	January 25, 1926	March 1, 1926	58	
The Half-Caste	Dr. David Holden	National Theatre	March 29, 1926	May 1, 1926	64	
Trapped	Vincent Lorrimore	National Theatre	September 11, 1928	September 30, 1928	15	
Adventure	Jed Hampton	Theatre Republic	October 1, 1928 (Note: The available sources are confusing about the opening date of Adventure at the Theatre Republic in 1928, which they document as having taken place on "September 25". At the Playbill website, the digitized copy of page 15 of the play's original playbill states clearly: "Week beginning Monday evening, October 1, 1928" (Adventure Playbill #9965). Unless the closing date of Trapped on "September 30" at the National Theatre is in error, it seems improbable that Ingersoll could also have performed in Adventure if the latter had really opened on "September 25", as currently documented at both the IBDB and Playbill websites. Both these sources are also silent about the closing date of Adventure (Adventure IBDB #10723; Adventure Playbill #9965).)	October ??, 1928	23	
Hotbed	Rev. David Rushbrook	Klaw Theatre	November 8, 1928	November ??, 1928	19	
Brothers	Dr. Calvin Moore	48th Street Theatre	December 25, 1928	August 3, 1929	255	
Fata Morgana	George's Father	Royale Theatre	December 25, 1931	January 1, 1932	27	
Angeline Moves In	Prosper Weems	Forrest Theatre	April 19, 1932	April 30, 1932	7	
The Web	Professor Warren	Morosco Theatre	June 27, 1932	July ??, 1932	24	
We, The People	Thomas Williamson	Empire Theatre	January 21, 1933	March 1, 1933	49	
Nine Pine Street	Dr. Powell	Longacre Theatre	April 27, 1933	May ??, 1933	28	
A Church Mouse	Count von Talheim	Mansfield Theatre	June 26, 1933	July 1, 1933	9	
A Divine Moment	Admiral Standish	Vanderbilt Theatre	January 6, 1934	January 13, 1934	9	
The First Legion	Rev. Paul Duquesne	46th Street Theatre	October 1, 1934	October 27, 1934	112	
The First Legion	Rev. Paul Duquesne	Biltmore Theatre	October 29, 1934	January 5, 1935	112	

=== Film ===
- Partners of the Night (1920), as Police Commissioner Thorne
- The Cheat (1931), as Croupier
- Fifi (1933), as Uncle
- Mary Burns, Fugitive (1935), as Judge
- Whipsaw (1935), as Dr. Williams
- Little Lord Fauntleroy (1936), as the Doctor
- Half Angel (1936), as Judge
- And Sudden Death (1936), as Judge
