= John Golden =

American actor, songwriter, author and theatrical producer (1874–1955)

John Lionel Golden
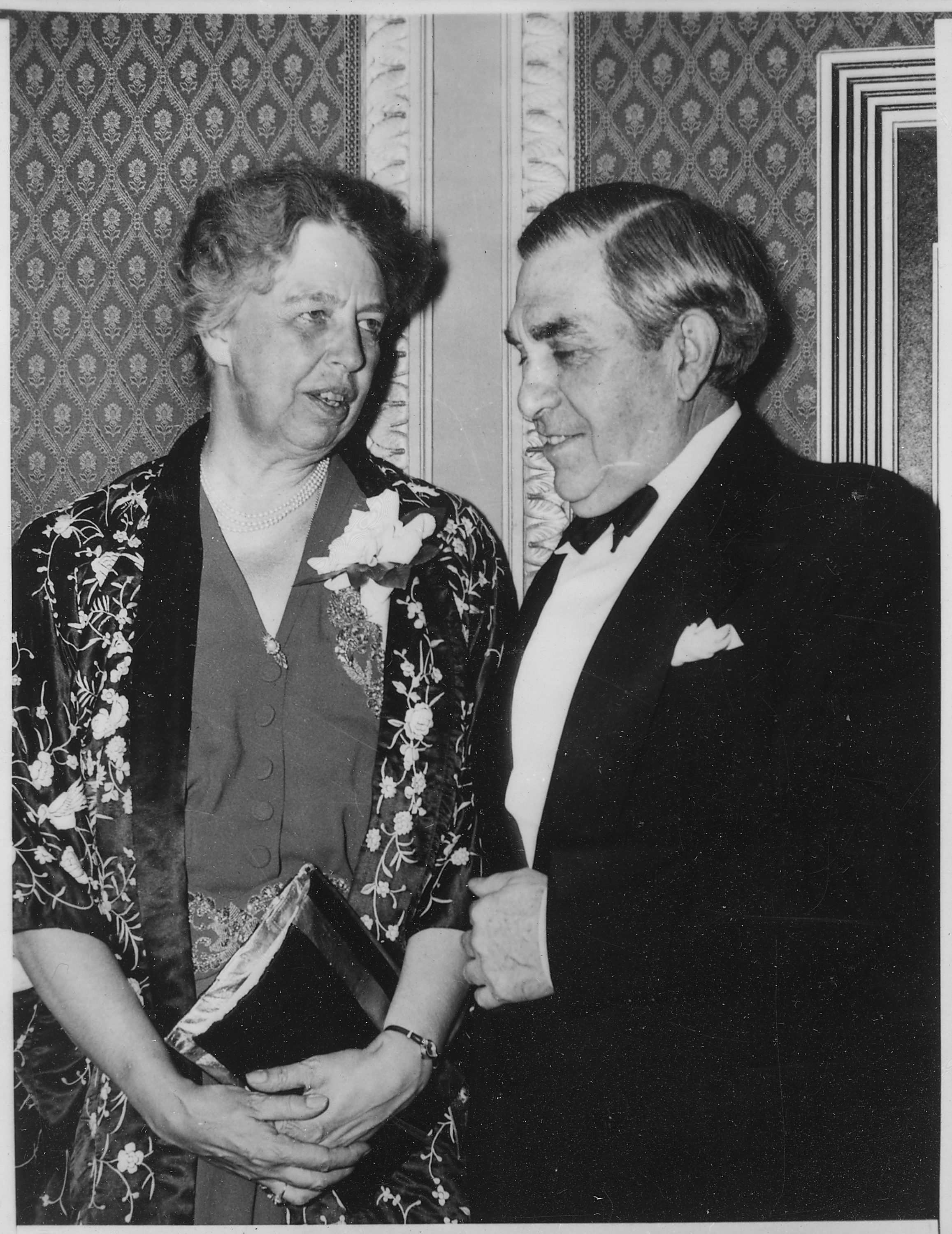
- Eleanor Roosevelt and John Golden in New York City, June 14, 1943
- Born: June 27, 1874; New York City, New York, United States
- Died: June 17, 1955 (aged 80); New York City, New York, United States
- Occupations: Actor, songwriter, author and theatrical producer
- Known for: Poor Butterfly

John Lionel Golden (June 27, 1874 – June 17, 1955) was an American actor, songwriter, author, and theatrical producer. As a songwriter, he is most notable as lyricist for "Poor Butterfly" (1916). He produced many Broadway shows and four films.

== Life ==
=== Early years ===
John L. Golden was born in New York City on June 27, 1874. He grew up in Wauseon, Ohio and returned to New York when he was fourteen. Golden briefly attended the law school at New York University. He joined a chemical manufacturing firm, where he worked for thirteen years.

=== Composer ===
Golden began a career as a lyricist. He composed the music for Miss Prinnt, a musical farce in which his friend Marie Dressler starred, that opened in late 1900 in New York City. It was described by the critic Alan Dale as "a ghastly collection of decayed jokes, taphouse slang, meaningless music and direly trashy story..." He contributed lyrics to The Hoyden, a Charles Dillingham production that ran from October 19, 1907, to February 1, 1908. He wrote the music and lyrics for Florenz Ziegfeld's Over the River (1912). This otherwise mundane show, co-produced by Dillingham, was the first in which ballroom dancing appeared on the legitimate stage. Charles Dillingham hired Golden, now well known as a lyricist, to work on his Hip-Hip-Hooray. It opened at the Hippodrome on September 30, 1915, and ran for 425 performances. The show received excellent reviews. Between 1909 and 1921, R. H. Burnside staged many spectacular shows at the Hippodrome. Golden wrote the lyrics for four of these shows in a row.

Sheet music of "Poor Butterfly" (1916)

While they were working for the Hippodrome shows in 1916, Golden and John Raymond Hubbell were asked to create a Japanese-style song. In Golden's autobiography Stagestruck (1930) he recalls creating Poor Butterfly with Hubbell in the summer of 1916. They went down to the elephant pens in the basement of the Hippodrome to find somewhere cool. Hubbell started to play the melody, and the lyrics quickly came to Golden, despite the presence and smell of the beasts. The song is about the central character in Madame Butterfly and was sung by Haru Onuki in The Big Show, which ran for 425 performances at the Hippodrome from August 13, 1916, to September 1917. Poor Butterfly became a smash hit.

Another popular Golden song was Goodbye, Girls, I'm Through.

=== Stage producer ===
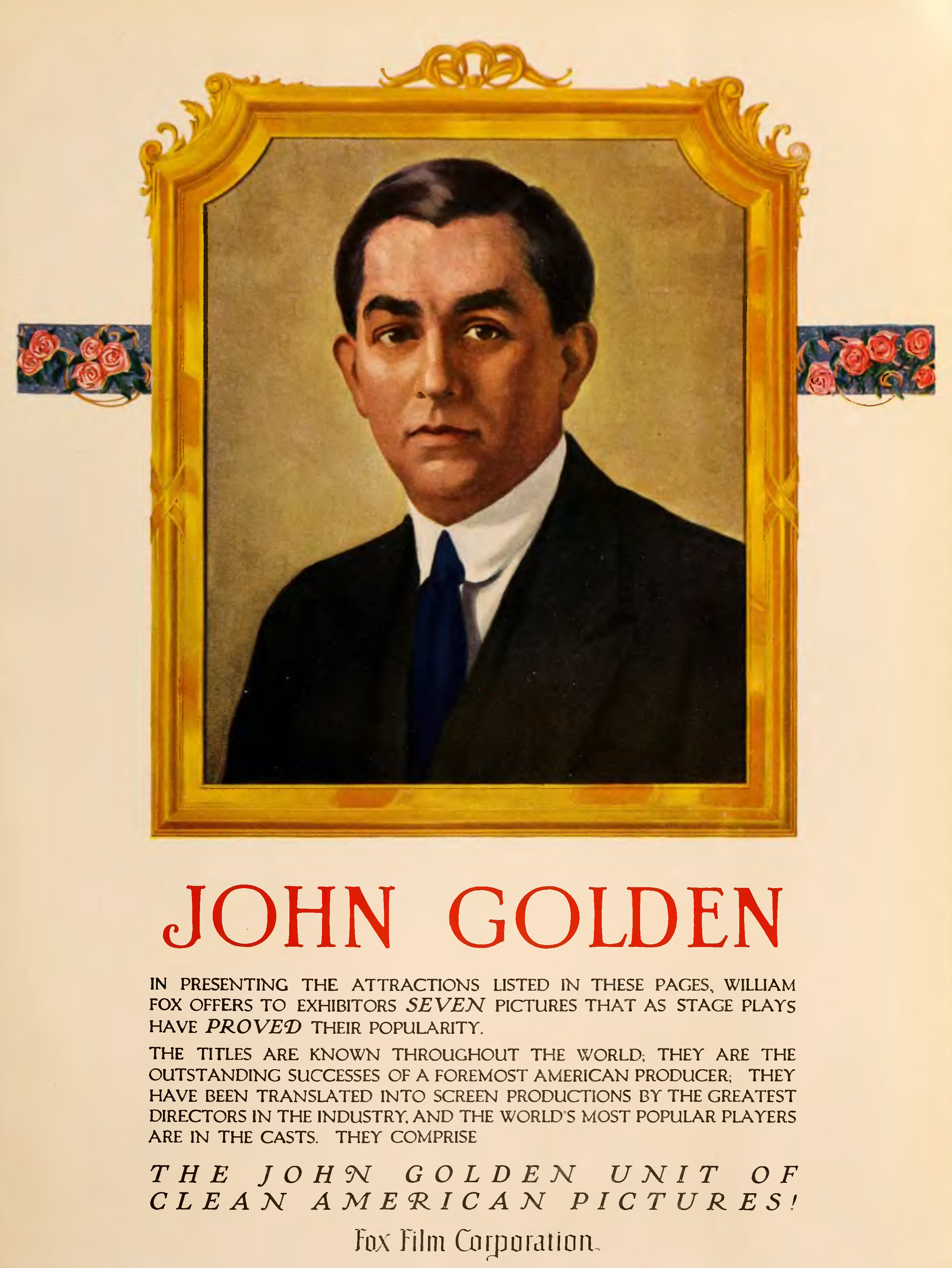
The John Golden Unit of Clean American Pictures! ad in Motion Picture News, 1925

With the earnings from his songs Golden moved into producing and staging shows. He always avoided anything risqué. His first show was Turn to the Right (1916). It was a hit, as were eight of his next eleven shows. His second show, Lightnin', ran for three years. Lightnin' was co-written by Frank Bacon, who became Golden's partner and co-produced Turn to the Right!. The other writer was Winchell Smith. It was first staged in February 1918. President Woodrow Wilson attended a show with his wife and called Golden to his box, telling him the play was the most entertaining they had ever seen. Lightnin' played for 1,291 performances on Broadway, a record at the time. (Note: Lightnin' held the record for longest-running Broadway show until the mid-1920s, when it was surpassed by Abie's Irish Rose.) After Lightnin' closed the cast paraded down Broadway to Pennsylvania Station, where they boarded a train for a tour of the nation. The parade was headed by Mayor John Francis Hylan and Commissioner Grover Whalen.

Other hits were Three Wise Fools, Seventh Heaven, The First Year and Claudia. Golden staged Guy Bolton's Chicken Feed at the Little Theatre in 1923, playing to good audiences. In 1924 he presented Pigs at the Little, another hit. Golden produced Phoebe and Henry Ephron's Three's a Family in 1943 at the Longacre Theatre, the last play staged there until 1953. Three's a Family (1943–44) was Golden's last hit.

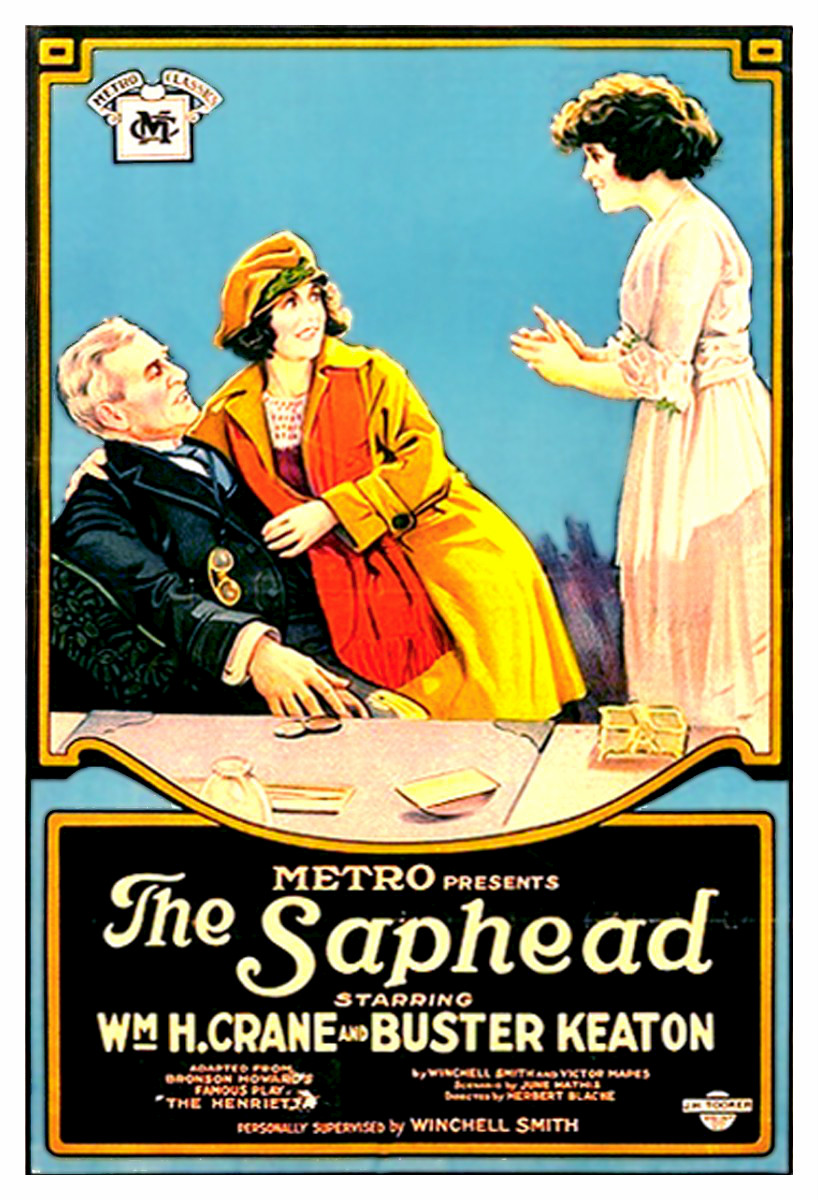
Poster for The Saphead

=== Films ===
The Saphead (1920), a film starring Buster Keaton, was presented by John L. Golden and Winchell Smith in conjunction with Marcus Loew. It was based on The New Henrietta, a 1913 stage hit for which Golden and Smith had been responsible. In 1925 Golden produced the film Thank You, adapted from a play by Winchell Smith and Tom Cushing, directed by John Ford and starring George O'Brien. The film of Lightnin', adapted from Golden's stage success, appeared on October 31, 1930. In 1932 Golden co-produced the film version of Those We Love, starring Mary Astor, Kenneth MacKenna and Lilyan Tashman.

=== Theater operator ===
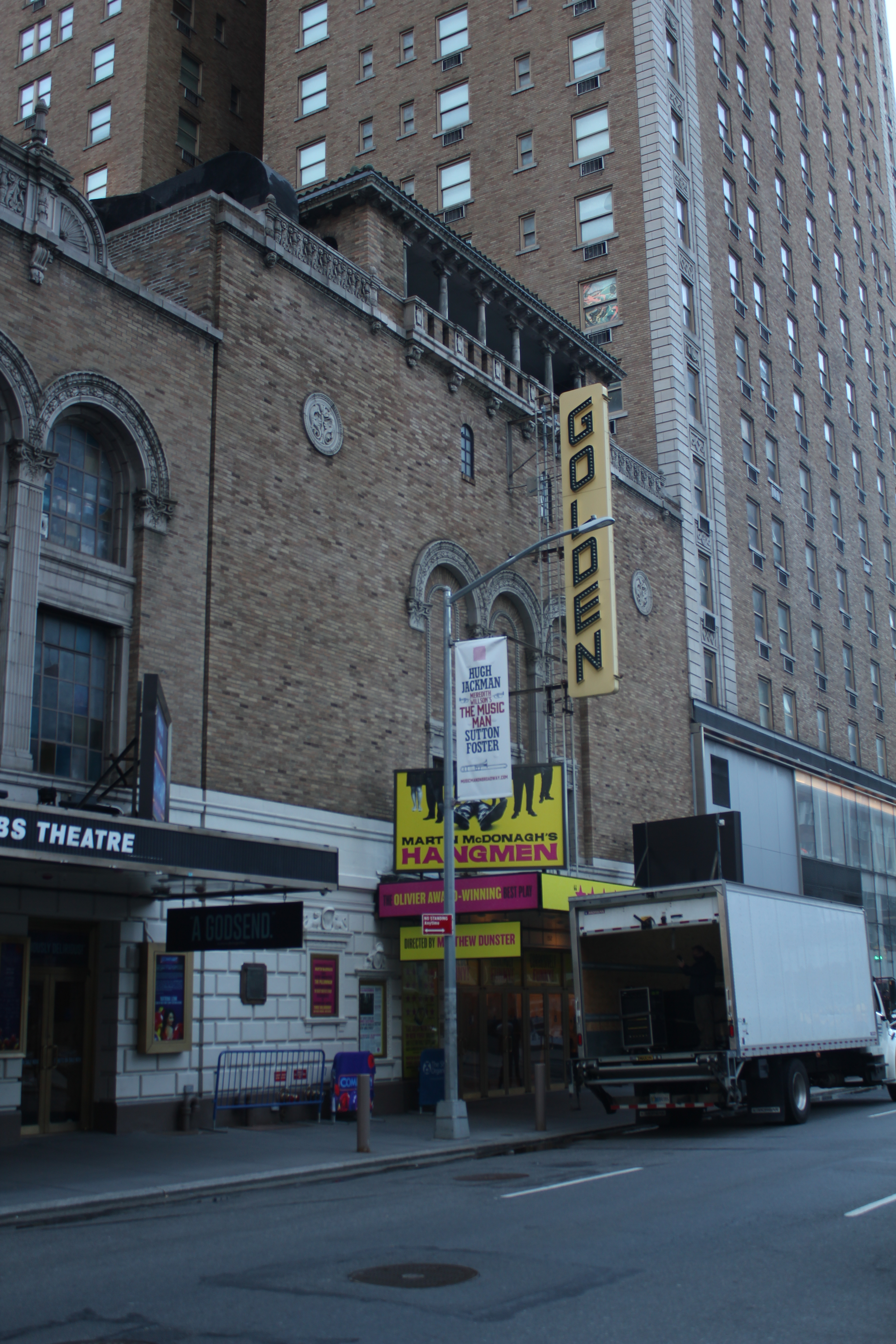
John Golden Theatre, NYC 2022

The first John Golden Theater was designed by Harrison G. Wiseman and opened at 202 W. 58th Street, Manhattan, on November 1, 1926. The first show was Two Girls Wanted, which had been playing at the Little Theatre. It was renamed the 58th Street Theater on September 17, 1935. When Golden lost the 54th Street theater he leased the Royale Theater at 242 W. 45th Street and renamed it the Golden Theater. He operated it from 1934 to 1936. The first production was Norma Krasna's Small Miracle in 1934. The theater struggled during the Depression. In 1936 the Shubert brothers took it and changed the name back to the Royale. They leased it to CBS for use as a radio theater.

In 1937 Golden bought the Masque Theatre, which had been designed in 1927 by Herbert J. Krapp for Irwin Chanin and his brother Henry I. Chanin. He renamed it the John Golden Theatre, the third theater in New York named after him. The 800-seat venue at 252 W. 45th Street had its first success under the new name with Shadow and Substance (1938) starring Julie Haydon and Sir Cedric Hardwicke. After mixed success, in mid-1946 the theater became a cinema. It returned to stage performances on February 29, 1948, with a one-man show by Maurice Chevalier and continued to stage a variety of plays and other shows into the 2000s.

=== Other activities ===
During his long career Golden made a fortune from the theater, and gave much in return as a philanthropist. He was known for his wholesome values and had a logo with the motto “Comiclean” printed on his business stationery. In World War I and again in World War II he organized a service to provide free tickets to servicemen. He was a founder of the Stage Door Canteen and the Stage Relief Fund. Golden was a charter member of the American Society of Composers, Authors and Publishers (ASCAP), the first treasurer of this organization and director from 1914 to 1915. Golden was one of the first board members of the City Center of Music and Drama.

In 1919 John Golden arranged a meeting with fellow producers Fred Zimmerman, Archibald Selwyn, Florenz Ziegfeld, Jr., Winchell Smith, and L. Lawrence Weber with the goal of cooperating on common issues such as censorship and ticket speculation. He wanted to set up a forum so the producers could share ideas, and wanted to stop the rival organizations from poaching each other's stars. This led to formation of the Producing Managers' Association, which may have inadvertently shown actors the value of organizing into the Actors' Equity Association. Soon after, Equity launched a strike. Golden found himself called a traitor or enemy by actor friends such as Ralph Morgan and DeWolf Hopper. After a month and 37 closed productions and 16 stopped openings, the strike was settled on September 6, 1919. Golden was among the managers at the meeting in the St. Regis Hotel in which the strike was ended. The managers signed a five-year contract in which they recognized Equity and promised better conditions.

Golden was "Shepherd" of the Lambs, a social club for workers in the theatrical professions, from 1942 to 1944. In 1954 he was appointed New York City Chairman for United Nations Day. He was the author of the United Nations All Faith Prayer For Peace.

=== Family and legacy ===
Golden married Margaret Hesterich in 1909. They moved to the Bayside neighborhood of New York City in 1920. They bought a 15-room house on a 20-acre estate and gave 9 acres for use as baseball diamonds and a children's play center. Golden died at home of a heart attack on June 17, 1955.

Golden left the Bayside estate to the City of New York as a park "for the use and enjoyment by the young people of the community of all races and creeds in a manner similar to that in which I made this property available for recreation and community acts during my lifetime." The John Golden Park was dedicated on October 18, 1965. Speakers at the ceremony included Mayor Robert F. Wagner, Jr., Robert Moses, Parks Commissioner Newbold Morris, Bernard F. Gimbel (of Gimbels), Frederick O'Neal, Rube Goldberg, Harry Hershfield, and Vincent Sardi Jr. of Sardi's. The John Golden award provides grants to students at the Hunter College Master of Arts in Theatre in New York.

== Work ==
=== Lyrics ===
Golden wrote lyrics for many Broadway theatre productions, including:

- Miss Prinnt (Musical, Comedy) December 25, 1900 – November 19, 1901
- The Hoyden (Musical, Comedy) October 19, 1907 – February 1, 1908
- The Candy Shop (Musical, Comedy) April 27, 1909 – June 12, 1909
- Tillie's Nightmare (Musical, Comedy) May 5, 1910 – December 1911
- Girlies (Musical, Comedy) June 13, 1910 – August 27, 1910
- The Echo (Musical) August 17, 1910 – October 1, 1910
- Judy Forgot (Musical, Comedy) October 6, 1910 – November 12, 1910
- Over the River (Musical, Extravaganza, Farce) January 8, 1912 – April 20, 1912
- The Girl from Montmartre (Play, Farce) August 5, 1912 – April 1913
- A Winsome Widow (Musical, Comedy, Farce) April 11, 1912 – September 7, 1912
- The Sunshine Girl (Musical) February 3, 1913 – September 20, 1913
- A World of Pleasure (Musical, Revue) October 14, 1915 – January 22, 1916
- Sybil (Musical, Comedy) January 10, 1916 – June 3, 1916
- Hip! Hip! Hooray! (1915) (Musical, Revue) September 30, 1915 – June 3, 1916
- Go to It (Musical – music) October 24, 1916 – November 1916
- The Big Show (Musical, Revue, Spectacle) August 31, 1916 – May 5, 1917
- Cheer Up (Musical, Revue) August 23, 1917 – May 11, 1918
- Everything (Musical, Revue, Spectacle) August 22, 1918 – May 17, 1919
- The Midnight Rounders of 1921 (Musical, Revue) February 7, 1921 – April 2, 1921

=== Songs ===
Popular songs included:

- "Goodbye Girls, I'm Through"
- "Willie Off the Yacht"
- "I'm Growing Fond of You"
- "Your Heart Looked Into Mine"
- "I Can Dance With Everybody but My Wife"
- "You Can't Play Every Instrument in the Band"

=== Theater productions ===
Golden produced many Broadway theatre productions, including:

- Turn To The Right (1916)
- Lightnin' (Play, Comedy) August 26, 1918 – August 27, 1921
- Three Wise Fools (Play, Comedy) October 31, 1918 – August 1919
- Thunder (Play, Comedy) September 22, 1919 – October 1919
- The First Year (Play, Comedy) October 20, 1920 – August 1922
- Dear Me (Play, Comedy) January 17, 1921 – May 1921
- The Wheel (Play, Drama) August 29, 1921 – September 1921
- Thank You (Play, Comedy) October 3, 1921 – May 1922
- A Serpent's Tooth (Play) August 24, 1922 – September 1922
- Spite Corner (Play, Comedy) September 25, 1922 – January 1923
- Seventh Heaven (Play, Comedy) October 30, 1922 – July 1924
- Chicken Feed (Play, Comedy) September 24, 1923 – January 1924
- Pigs (Play, Comedy) September 1, 1924 – June 1925
- A Holy Terror (Play) September 28, 1925 – October 1925
- The Wisdom Tooth (Play, Comedy) February 15, 1926 – July 1926
- Two Girls Wanted (Play, Comedy) September 9, 1926 – June 1927
- The Gossipy Sex (Play, Farce) April 19, 1927 – May 1927
- Four Walls (Play) September 19, 1927 – January 1928
- Eva the Fifth (Play, writer) August 28, 1928 – October 1928
- Night Hostess (Play, Comedy, Drama) September 12, 1928 – December 1928
- Let Us Be Gay (Play, Comedy) February 19, 1929 – December 1929
- Salt Water (Play, Comedy) November 26, 1929 – February 1930
- Joseph (Play, Comedy) February 12, 1930 – February 1930
- Ada Beats the Drum (Play, Comedy) May 8, 1930 – June 1930
- That's Gratitude (Play, Comedy) September 11, 1930 – March 1931
- London Calling (Play, Comedy) October 18, 1930 – October 1930
- As Husbands Go (Play, Comedy) March 5, 1931 – July 1931
- After Tomorrow (Play, Drama) August 26, 1931 – November 1931
- Caught Wet (Play) November 4, 1931 – November 1931
- Savage Rhythm (Play, Drama) December 31, 1931 – January 1932
- Riddle Me This (Play, Comedy) February 25, 1932 – May 1932
- When Ladies Meet (Play, Comedy) October 6, 1932 – March 4, 1933
- When Ladies Meet (Play, Comedy) May 15, 1933 – May 1933
- A Divine Drudge (Play, Drama – writer) October 26, 1933 – November 1933
- No Questions Asked (Play, Comedy) February 5, 1934 – February 1934
- The Bishop Misbehaves (Play, Comedy) February 20, 1935 – June 1935
- A Touch of Brimstone (Play) September 22, 1935 – December 1935
- Tomorrow's a Holiday (Play, Drama) December 30, 1935 – January 1936
- Three Wise Fools (Play, Comedy, Revival) March 1, 1936 – March 1936
- And Now Good-bye (Play, Drama) February 2, 1937 – February 1937
- Susan and God (Play, Comedy) October 7, 1937 – Closing date unknown
- Lightnin' (Play, Comedy, Revival) September 15, 1938 – November 1938
- Skylark (Play, Comedy) October 11, 1939 – May 25, 1940
- The Old Foolishness (Play) December 20, 1940 – December 21, 1940
- Theatre (Play, Comedy) November 12, 1941 – January 10, 1942
- Claudia (Play, Comedy) February 12, 1941 – January 9, 1943
- Counsellor-at-Law (Play, Revival) November 24, 1942 – July 10, 1943
- The Army Play-by Play (producer) June 14, 1943 – September 4, 1943
- Susan and God (Play, Comedy) December 13, 1943 – December 18, 1943
- But Not Goodbye (Play) April 11, 1944 – April 29, 1944
- Three's a Family (Play) May 5, 1943 – July 8, 1944
- A Place of Our Own (Play) April 2, 1945 – April 7, 1945
- Made in Heaven (Play, Comedy) October 24, 1946 – January 11, 1947
- They Knew What They Wanted (Play, Comedy, Revival) February 16, 1949 – April 9, 1949
- The Male Animal (Play, Comedy, Revival) May 15, 1952 – January 31, 1953
- Seventh Heaven (Musical) May 26, 1955 – July 2, 1955

=== Films ===
Golden produced the following films:

- The Saphead (1920)
- Thank You (1925)
- Lightnin' (1930)
- Those We Love (1932)

== Awards ==
In 1937, he received an honorary degree in Doctor of Public Service from Oglethorpe University.

== Bibliography ==
- Ankerich, Michael G. (November 1, 2012). Mae Murray: The Girl with the Bee-stung Lips. University Press of Kentucky. ISBN 978-0-8131-3690-5.
- Bloom, Ken (December 4, 2003). Broadway: An Encyclopedia. Routledge. ISBN 978-1-135-95020-0.
- Bloom, Ken (2007). The Routledge Guide to Broadway. Taylor & Francis. ISBN 978-0-415-97380-9.
- Bogdanovich, Peter (1967). John Ford. University of California Press. GGKEY:UKU6GF3RFNU.
- "Equity Timeline 1919". AEA. Archived from the original on May 12, 2014.
- "Frank Bacon Arrives" (PDF). The New York Times. September 1, 1918.
- Grieveson, Lee; Krämer, Peter (2004). The Silent Cinema Reader. Psychology Press. ISBN 978-0-415-25284-3.
- Hardee, Lewis (2006). The Lambs Theatre Club. McFarland. p. 120. ISBN 978-0-7864-2321-7.
- "John Golden". IBDB.
- "John Golden". IMDb.
- "John Golden Biography". IMDb.
- "John Golden, Famed Theater Producer, Dies". The San Bernardino Sun. June 18, 1955.
- "John Golden Park". NYC Parks.
- "John Golden Theatre". Playbill Vault.
- Lee, Betty (December 6, 2013). Marie Dressler: The Unlikeliest Star. University Press of Kentucky. ISBN 978-0-8131-4571-6.
- Library of Congress. Copyright Office (1929). Catalog of Copyright Entries. U.S. Government Printing Office.
- "Master's Program in Theatre". Hunter College.
- Meade, Marion (April 1, 2014). Buster Keaton: Cut to the Chase. Open Road Media. ISBN 978-1-4976-0231-1.
- Naden, Corinne J. (February 1, 2011). The Golden Age of American Musical Theatre: 1943-1965. Scarecrow Press. ISBN 978-0-8108-7734-4.
- "Poor Butterfly (1916)". Jazz Standards.
- "Those We Love (1932)". IMDb.
