= Mary Burns, Fugitive =

1935 film by William K. Howard

- 1935 Theatrical Poster
- Directed by: William K. Howard
- Written by: C. Graham Baker; Louis Stevens; Gene Towne
- Produced by: Walter Wanger
- Starring: Sylvia Sidney; Melvyn Douglas; Alan Baxter
- Cinematography: Leon Shamroy
- Edited by: Hanson Fritch
- Music by: Heinz Roemheld
- Distributed by: Paramount Pictures
- Release date: November 15, 1935
- Running time: 84 minutes
- Country: United States
- Language: English
- Budget: $337,152
- Box office: $513,176

Mary Burns, Fugitive is a 1935 American drama film directed by William K. Howard.

Sylvia Sidney plays a small-town coffee-shop owner who falls for a gangster, ends up in prison and then released in a scheme to trap him.

== Plot ==
Mary Burns (Sylvia Sidney) runs a small roadside coffee shop near a rural town. She's desperately in love with 'Babe' Wilson (Alan Baxter), a young man who has fallen in love with Mary after coming to her coffee shop several times. However, Mary isn't aware that Babe is a gangster wanted for robbery and murder.

Babe and his partner in crime arrive at the coffee shop, and Babe tells Mary he has to go to Canada right away on “business”, but he wants them to get married immediately and go away with him. Unfortunately, Mary doesn't know that Babe's suitcase is filled with stolen loot.

As they prepare to leave, the police arrive to arrest Babe, but he kills his own partner to prevent him from testifying, then he escapes and leaves Mary to be arrested and convicted for aiding and abetting a known criminal.

After serving three years of her fifteen-year sentence, Mary escapes with a fellow female inmate, Goldie Gordon (Pert Kelton), unaware that Goldie is actually cooperating with the police. They want to use Mary to lure Babe out of hiding. Mary gets a job as a maid at a hospital, and she meets Barton Powell (Melvyn Douglas), a famous explorer and writer who is recovering from snow blindness. They fall in love after Mary spends several weeks reading to the blind man and talking with him about his adventures.

When one of Babe's accomplices, Spike (Brian Donlevy), comes to the small apartment that Mary and Goldie share and says he's taking her to Babe, Mary flees and goes to the hospital to see Barton one last time. She doesn't tell him she's leaving forever, she simply slips out quietly after he falls asleep.

Mary travels from Oklahoma to Utah and hides out in a small town, but Babe finds her and tries to abduct her during a church service. However, the police have tracked Mary to the small town. Undercover men among the congregation try to arrest Babe, but he shocks the crowd by producing a hand grenade, and he threatens to pull the pin if they don't let him leave with Mary. Babe and Mary escape, and he instructs her to hide again until he can find a way to rejoin her.

Mary is terrified of the homicidal killer, and she hopes he won't find her, but the police succeed in doing so again, and Detective Harper (Wallace Ford), the policeman in charge of the manhunt, takes her to Barton Powell's rustic lakeside house to reunite the couple. Barton has recovered his sight and sees Mary for the first time with his own eyes. He promptly proposes, and Mary accepts.

Detective Harper and his men stake out Barton's lakeside home and wait for Babe to show up to get Mary. But the wily killer manages to sneak into the house, and he threatens to shoot Barton if Mary doesn't leave with him.

Mary pretends she's about to kiss Babe, but she reaches inside his coat, takes hold of a second pistol in his shoulder holster, and pulls the trigger several times, killing Babe. Afterwards, Detective Harper sees to it that Mary's criminal record is expunged, and she marries Barton.

== Cast ==
- Sylvia Sidney as Mary Burns
- Melvyn Douglas as Barton Powell
- Alan Baxter as Babe Wilson
- Pert Kelton as Goldie Gordon
- Wallace Ford as Harper
- Brian Donlevy as Spike
- Esther Dale as Kate
- George Chandler as Cashier
- William Ingersoll as Judge
- Frances Gregg as Prison Matron
- Grace Hayle as Nurse Jennie
- Joe Twerp as Willie
- Frank Sully as Steve
- Norman Willis as Joe
- Charles Waldron as District Attorney
- Rita Stanwood as Nurse Agnes (*as Rita Stamwood)
- Daniel L. Haynes as Jeremiah
- William Pawley as Mike

== Reception ==
The film earned a profit of $29,089.

== Bibliography ==
- EAMES, John Douglas, The Paramount Story, London: Octopus Books, 1985
