= Three Wise Fools (play) =

1917 play by Austin Strong

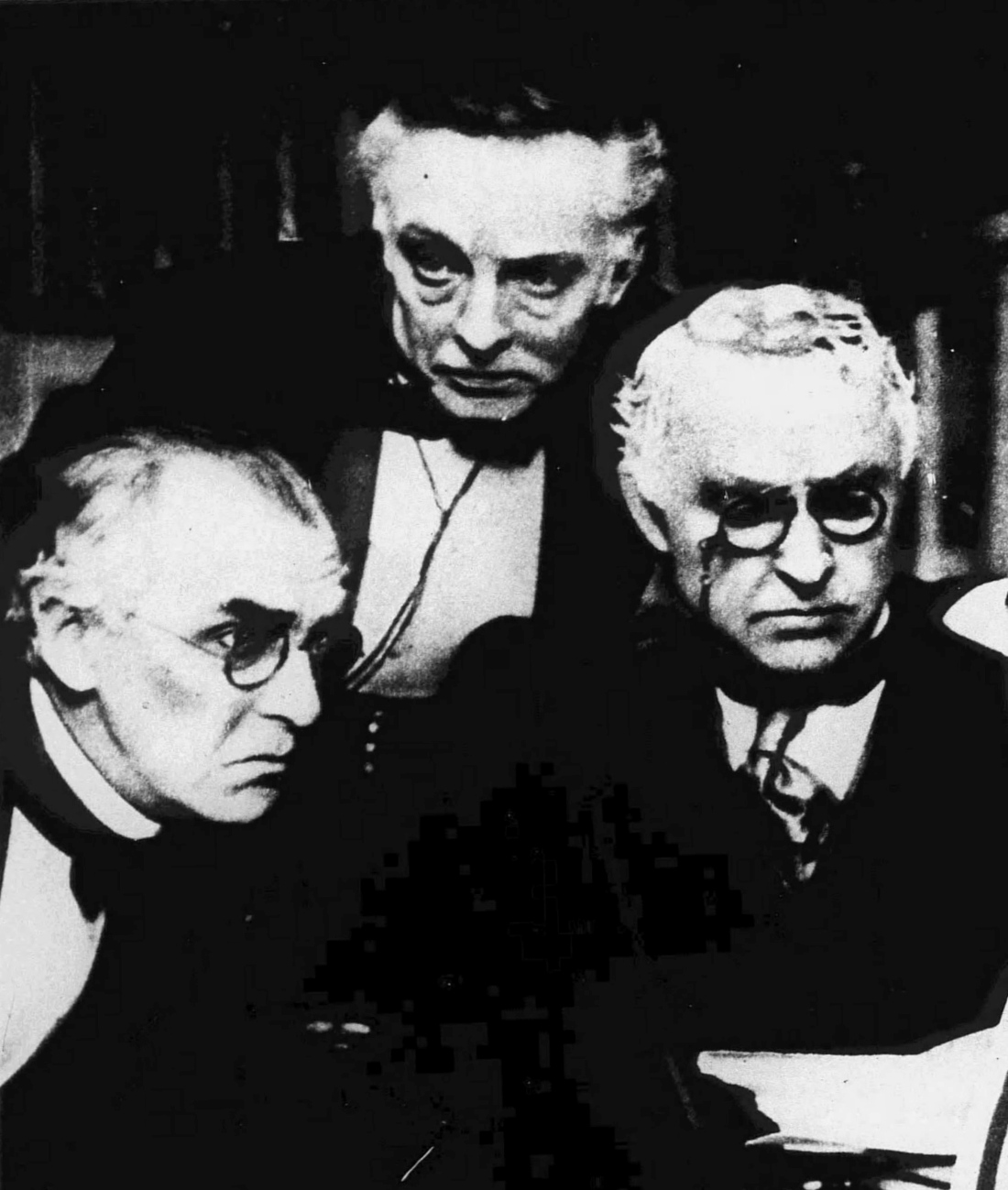
- Claude Gillingwater, Harry Davenport, and William Ingersoll
- Original title: Three Wise Men
- Original language: English
- Written by: Austin Strong
- First publication: 1919
- Subject: Three old bachelors and a young lady
- Genre: Comedy
- Setting: Living room of a large home in Washington Square

Premiere
- Date: October 31, 1918
- Place: Criterion Theatre
- Directed by: Winchell Smith
- Original run: 316 performances

Three Wise Fools is a 1917 play by Austin Strong. Originally titled Three Wise Men, it is a three-act comedy, with a single setting and thirteen speaking characters. The action of the play takes place over four weeks' time. The story concerns a household of three eminent old bachelors shaken up by the arrival of a young woman.

The play was first produced by Winchell Smith and John Golden. It was initially staged by Austin Strong, then re-staged by Winston Smith. Three Wise Fools starred Claude Gillingwater, Harry Davenport, and William Ingersoll, with Helen Menken in her first major role. Under its original name, it had tryouts in Washington, D.C., and Stamford, Connecticut, in May 1918. Further production was delayed until a tryout in Hartford, Connecticut, in October 1918. It premiered on Broadway at the end of that same month, under its new name, where it ran through August 1919, for 316 performances.

While still running on Broadway, a separate West End production was mounted in July 1919 by André Charlot, with Austin Strong directing. This ran until April 1920, with Margaret Bannerman and Pat Somerset among the cast.

Three Wise Fools had a limited revival on Broadway during 1936. It was adapted for a 1923 silent film of the same name, and for a very different sort of story in a 1946 film, also of the same name.

== Characters ==
Characters are listed in order of appearance within their scope. The three lead characters are elderly bachelors, who met long ago while in romantic pursuit of a young lady who married someone else. They refer to themselves as The Musketeers and live together in a large old house on Washington Square in Manhattan.

Lead

- Theodore Findley called Teddy, is a wealthy financier, gruff and argumentative, known as Porthos.
- Dr. Richard Gaunt called Dick, is a brain specialist, amusing and a joker, known as Aramis.
- Hon. James Trumbull called Jimmie, is a criminal court judge, dignified and calm, known as Athos.

Supporting

- Gordon Schuyler is 22, a college graduate, the wealthy nephew and former ward of Findley.
- Sidney Fairchild is 18, the daughter of Rena, the long lost love of the three men.

Featured

- Gray is the butler for the Washington Square household.
- Mrs. Saunders performs the formal role of housekeeper but does not hold that title. (Note: A bit of dialogue in Act I establishes that Findley supervises the accounts kept by Mrs. Saunders and holds the keys, making him the official housekeeper.)
- Poole is a calm, expressionless detective inspector.
- Douglas is a young footman in the household.
- Benjamin Suratt, AKA Benny the Duck, is a convicted forger, sentenced by Judge Trumbull.
- Clancy is a police plain clothes detective, subordinate to Poole.
- John Crawshay is a wrongly convicted embezzler, Benny's cellmate, and secretly, Sidney's father.

Bit player

- Policeman is present briefly in pursuit of Benny the Duck. (Note: Cast lists indicate this character was played by the ubiquitous George Spelvin.)

== Synopsis ==
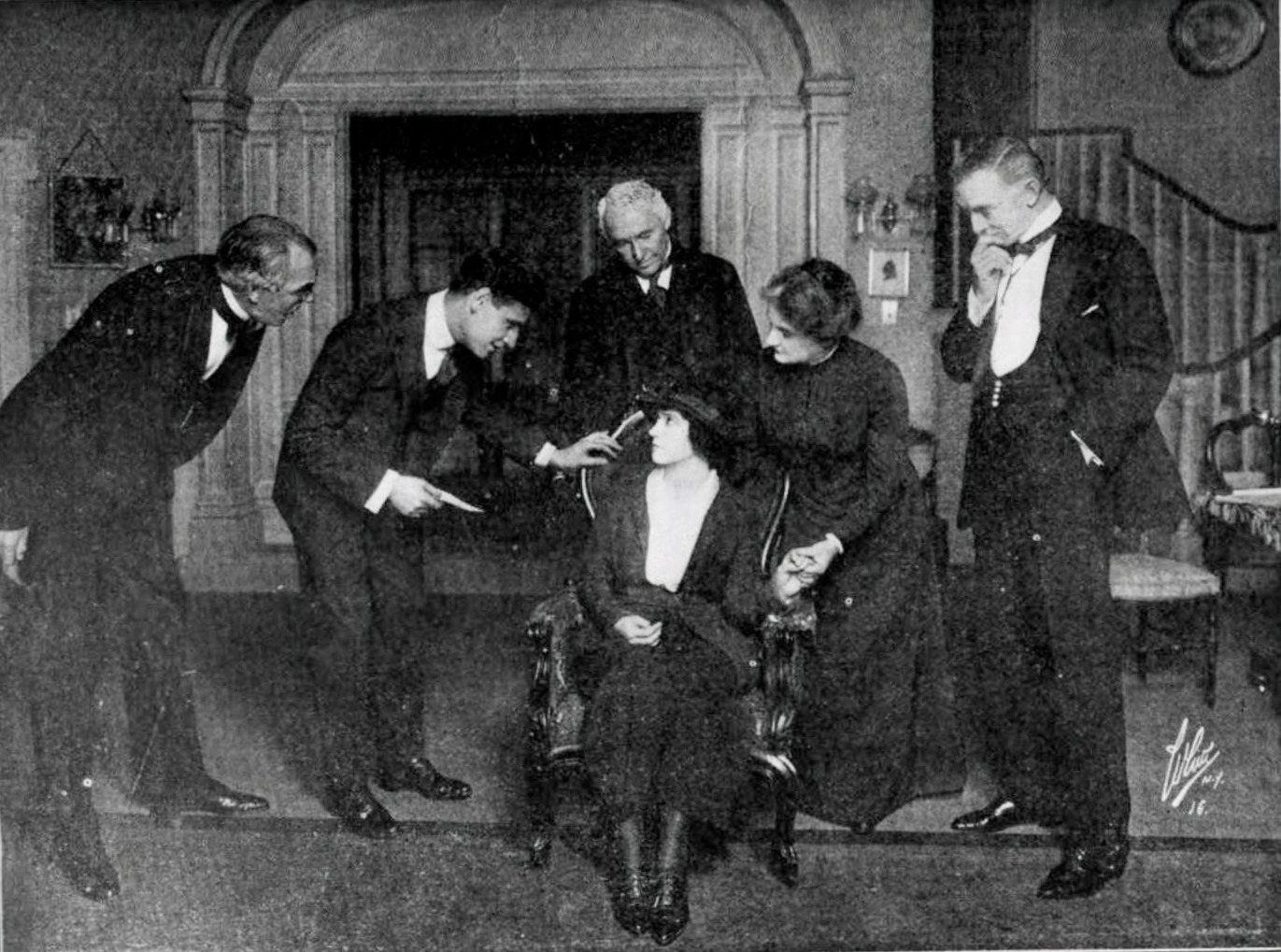

Act I (Living room of the Washington Square home. A Thursday evening.) Theodore Findley and Dr. Richard Gaunt are spending a typical evening in the house they jointly own with Judge Trumbull. The latter stays late at the courthouse on Thursdays, and is not yet home. Findley taxes Gray and Mrs. Saunders with any deviation from established routine, going so far as to time their actions. Used to his finicky ways and having no fear of dismissal, for that would entail disruption of routine, the servants carry on calmly. Dr. Gaunt tweaks Findley over their highly-regulated life, suggesting they are "unburied dead", stuck in their daily ruts. Findley is further disturbed by the attitude of Gordon, who resists taking a sensible job in favor of volunteer work, since he is already wealthy. Gray brings in a police detective named Poole, who says the police are shadowing the Judge. Benny the Duck has escaped prison and sworn to get the judge who sentenced him. When the Judge arrives, a letter is brought in. It is from a dying Rena Fairchild, asking them to take of her child Sidney. The letter is two months old, and Rena has already died. The three old men agree among themselves to offer their home and protection, but are astonished when Sidney proves to be a young lady. Recovering quickly, they still offer her shelter and a chance to study law with the Judge. Gordon, plainly smitten with her, announces he will take up the job Findley offered him. (Curtain)

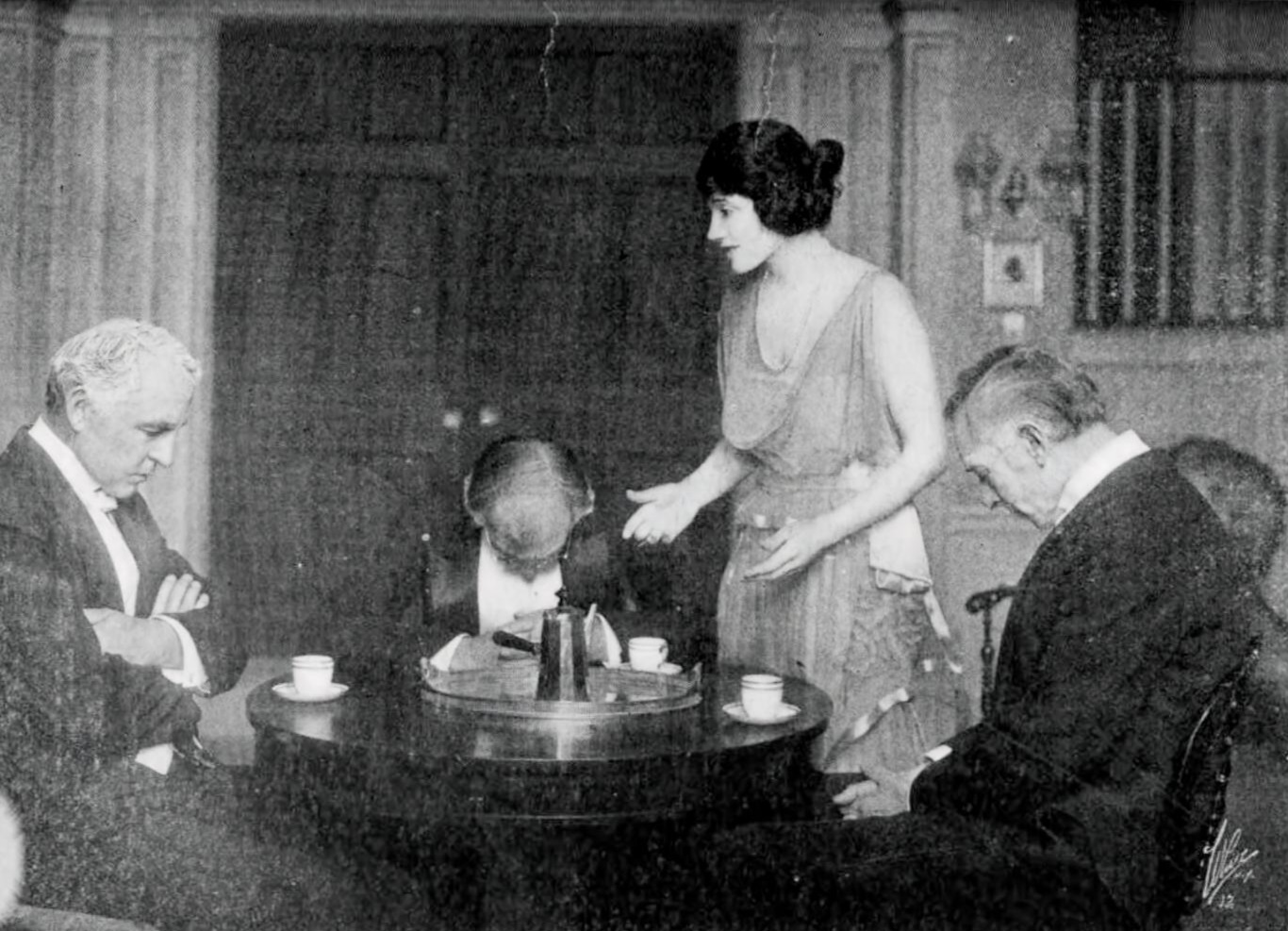

Act II (Same as Act I. Four weeks later.) The three old bachelors have dined with Sidney to celebrate her one-month anniversary of residence. She has kept accounts for Findley, patient appointments for Dr. Gaunt, and helped prepare briefs with the Judge. She is made housekeeper, and given Findley's key ring, which also has a police whistle on it. They present her with a pearl necklace and announce they will take her to the opera. While the old fellows get ready, Gordon gives Sidney a watch he bought with his first month's wages. Sidney learns from him the house is being watched by detectives to protect the judge. As Gray answers the front door, Benny the Duck bursts in, knocking him out. Sidney screams and Benny grabs her; they recognize each other. Sidney pleads with Benny to leave the judge alone, he tries to get past her, and she blows the police whistle on the key ring. Sidney helps Benny escape by unlocking a skylight. Douglas opens the front door to admit Poole, Clancy and a policeman. Sidney is recognized by Clancy as the servant seen leaving the house each night. Questioned by the Judge, Sidney refuses to tell why she let Benny escape. The three old men are dejected at their misplaced trust, and Sidney rushes out. Gordon refuses to believe Sidney is guilty. He finds she has left the house, followed by Poole's men. Gordon accuses the old men of being fools, and goes with Poole to find Sidney. (Curtain)

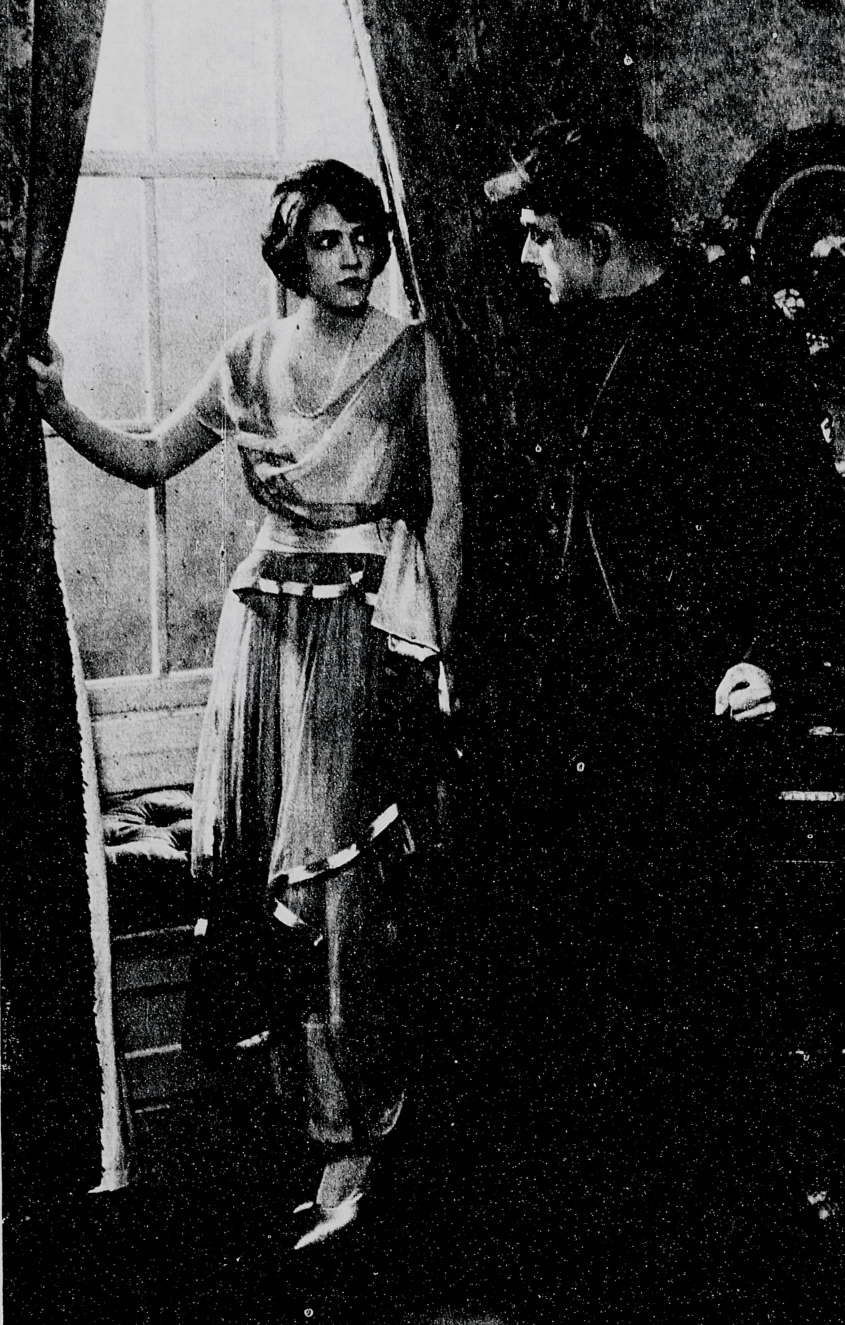

Act III (Same as Act I. A half-hour later.) Findley and Dr. Gaunt wait for Judge Trumbull to return from the local police station. Saunders, dismayed at the chaos and upset at Sidney's departure, gives notice. The Judge returns but without any news. Gordon strolls in, giving an apology but insisting he still means what he said. He accuses them of not having faith in Sidney, whom he intends to marry. Gordon explains it was Sidney who blew the police whistle, preventing Benny from attacking the Judge. He then reveals Poole has agreed to not arrest Sidney if the three Musketeers do not press charges. Gordon frankly admits to having bribed Poole, which none of the old men bats an eye at, not even the Judge. (Note: The published play has Gordon saying: "I made him understand that if Sidney doesn't see the inside of a jail, he's going to be a very rich man".) Poole enters: he has Sidney outside in the car, but she doesn't want to come in. Clancy brings in Benny, who refuses to say anything. The others leave Gordon alone when Douglas brings in Sidney. Gordon proposes; she thanks him but cannot answer any questions. She knows he bribed Poole for her freedom, but he tells her not to speak of it. They are at an impasse when Douglas brings in another man seeking Poole. John Crawshay and Findley recognize each other. Crawshay has come to give himself up to avoid trouble for Sidney. Seeing him, Benny spills that Crawshay is Sidney's father. Further, he confesses to having forged his signature so Crawshay can be released from custody. The three Musketeers are reconciled with Gordon and Sidney. (Curtain)

== Original production ==
=== Background ===
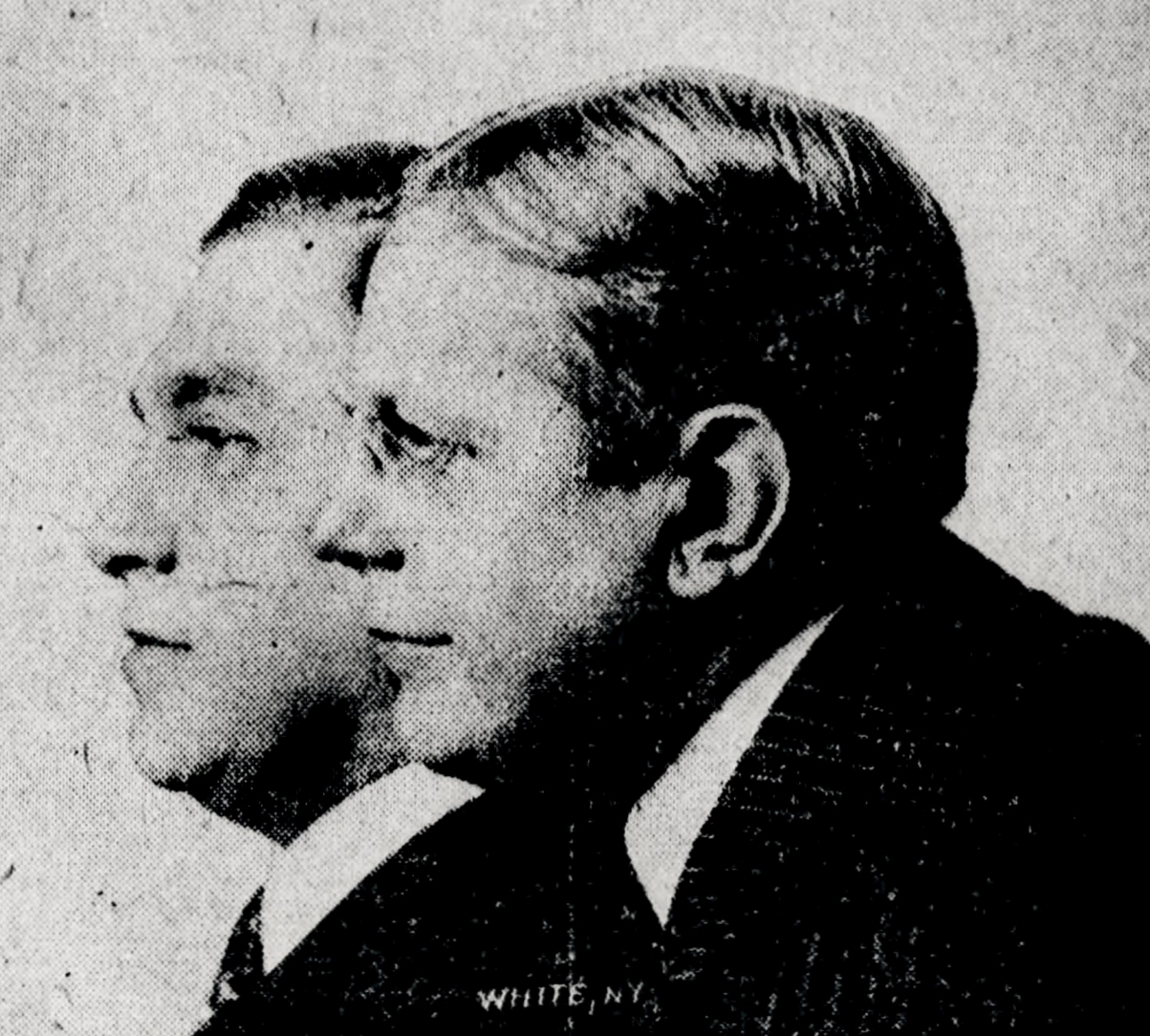
John Golden and Winchell Smith

Three Wise Men first came to public notice during August 1917, on a list of plays being considered for production by the new partnership of John Golden and Winchell Smith. The play would have a spring tryout it was reported in March 1918, and a month later rehearsals had started for a May tryout in Washington, D.C. The cast at this time was led by Lester Lonergan, Claude Gillingwater, and Albert Bruning.

The first performances were for a week-long engagement at the New National Theatre starting May 5, 1918. Frank P. Morse was impressed with Austin Strong's play structure, citing his technique of foreshadowing later action through casual dialogue. Morse felt that Helen Menken was "the most interesting member of the cast", assisted by Robert Ames as her young lover. President Wilson attended one of the performances that week, along with some veterans returning from France for a Liberty Loan bond drive. The Washington performances were staged by Austin Strong, as Winchell Smith was recovering from an eye affliction of long duration. John Golden scheduled a one-night performance at Stamford, Connecticut on May 18, 1918 so Smith could see the play.

The production was then put aside until late September 1918, when new rehearsals were started, this time under Winchell Smith's direction. The play was also recast, with only Claude Gillingwater, Helen Menken, Harry H. Forsman, and Sam E. Hines retained of the earlier players. Edwin Arden was signed to perform the role of Judge Trumbull, but on October 2, 1918, he died just after that day's rehearsal ended. As the production was committed for a charity performance on October 14, William Ingersoll was quickly engaged by the producers to take on the Judge Trumbull role.

=== Cast ===
The cast from the Hartford tryout through the Broadway run.
Role	Actor	Dates	Notes and sources
Theodore Findley	Claude Gillingwater	Oct 14, 1918 - Aug 02, 1919	
Dr. Richard Gaunt	Harry Davenport	Oct 14, 1918 - Aug 02, 1919	
Hon. James Trumbull	William Ingersoll	Oct 14, 1918 - Jun 21, 1919	Ingersoll was a late replacement for Edwin Arden, who died during rehearsals.
Hon. James Trumbull	Brigham Royce	Jun 23, 1919 - Aug 02, 1919	
Gordon Schuyler	Charles Laite	Oct 14, 1918 - Aug 02, 1919	
Sidney Fairchild	Helen Menken	Oct 14, 1918 - Aug 02, 1919	
Gray	Harry H. Forsman	Oct 14, 1918 - Apr 15, 1919	
Gray	Homer Hunt	Apr 16, 1919 - Aug 02, 1919	Hunt was a returning veteran when given this role and the stage manager job.
Mrs. Saunders	Phyllis Rankin	Oct 14, 1918 - Jun 21, 1919	Rankin was the daughter of actor McKee Rankin and married to Harry Davenport who played Dr. Gaunt.
Mrs. Saunders	Minnie Remaley	Jun 23, 1919 - Aug 02, 1919	
Poole	Hayward Ginn	Oct 14, 1918 - Jan 03, 1919	
Poole	Millard Vincent	Jan 05, 1919 - Aug 02, 1919	
Douglas	J. Moy Bennett	Oct 14, 1918 - Aug 02, 1919	
Benjamin Suratt	Sam E. Hines	Oct 14, 1918 - Oct 19, 1919	Hines received an unenthusiastic review for the Hartford tryout.
Benjamin Suratt	Stephen Colby	Oct 31, 1918 - Aug 02, 1919	
Clancy	Levitt James	Oct 14, 1918 - Aug 02, 1919	
John Crawshay	Charles B. Wells	Oct 14, 1918 - Aug 02, 1919	

=== Tryout ===
Three Wise Men had a week-long tryout at Parsons Theatre in Hartford, Connecticut, starting October 14, 1918. This location was selected because it was producer-director Winston Smith's birthplace. The local reviewer reported on the presence of Governor Holcomb and other dignitaries for the charity drive on opening night. They judged the play was good overall, but with a weak melodramatic second act, in which Helen Menken displayed some nervousness, which they ascribed equally to performer and playwright. The other actors received accolades, except Sam E. Hines who was described as "conventional", and hampered in the third act forgery scene by handcuffs.

Following the tryout's end, the producers announced the play's name would be changed to Three Wise Fools going forward.

=== Broadway premiere and reception ===
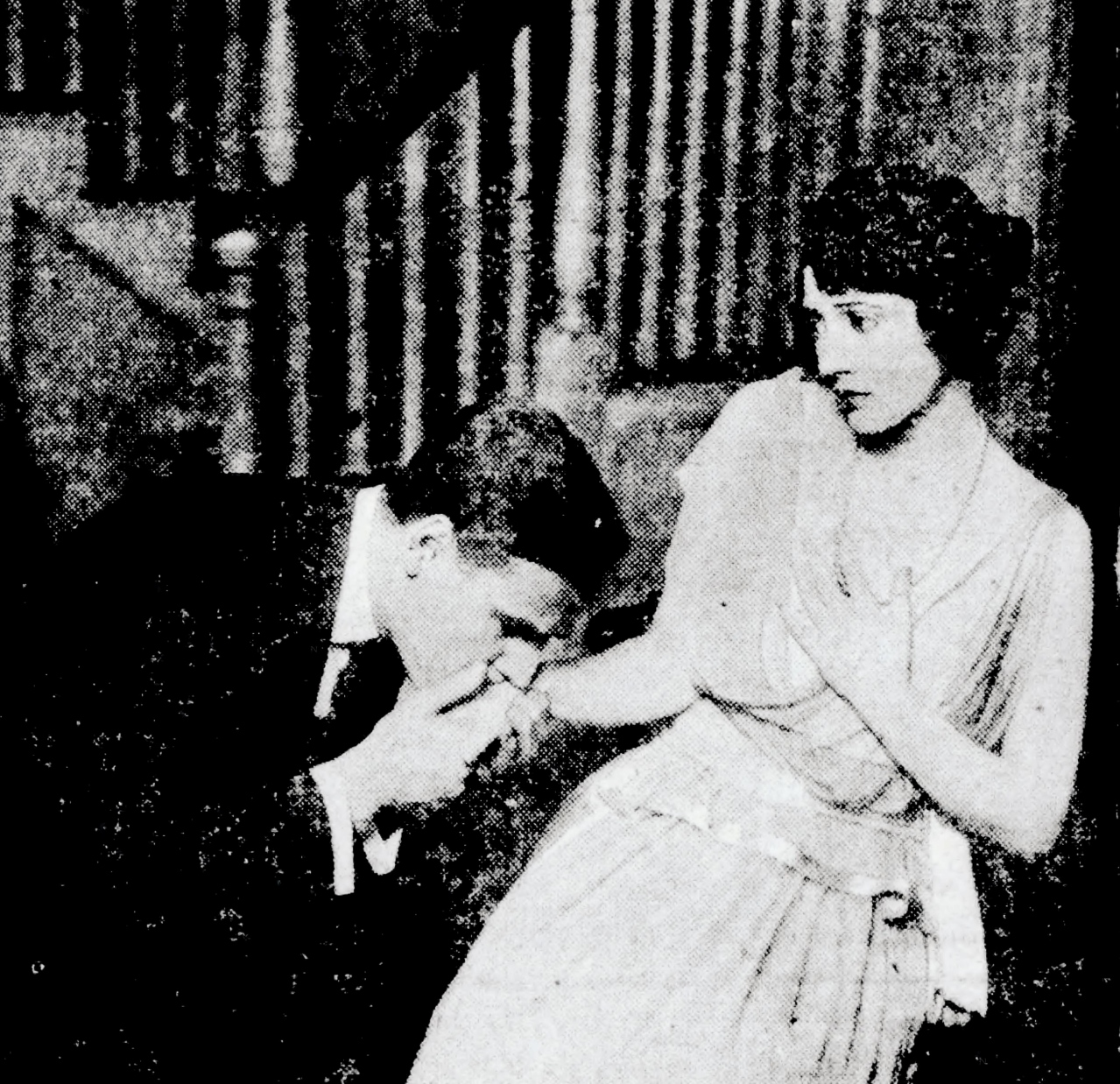

The production had its Broadway premiere at the Criterion Theatre on October 31, 1918. The reviewer for The Brooklyn Daily Eagle compared Three Wise Fools to the producers' earlier big hit Turn to the Right, in that both were simple unoriginal plots yet still appealing. The Brooklyn Daily Times critic said it was strong in sentiment with interesting melodramatic moments, and an assured success. The New-York Tribune reviewer was less positive about Three Wise Fools, saying it veered between "a sugary sentimentality and a familiar brand of crook melodrama", with much of the play's initial charm lost by the third act.

The critic for The New York Times identified two themes: the shaking up of settled elderly lives by a young person, and the unjust persecution of a sympathetic character. They commended Austin Strong for wisely introducing the second theme as interest in the first waned during the second act. The Sun reviewer saluted the producers' commercial instincts and noted the similarity with When We Were Twenty-One by H. V. Esmond, though they felt Three Wise Fools was a better story. The Brooklyn Life critic said Three Wise Fools was not art but "consummate stagecraft", with most of the cast performing well, though with "no chance for deep characterization".

=== Broadway closing ===
Three Wise Fools closed at the Criterion Theatre on Saturday, August 2, 1919, after 316 performances. At the time of its closing, the New-York Tribune reported it "was the only play in years which has been running simultaneously in New York, London, Australia and Honolulu." Following the Manhattan closing, it went on tour, with a week-long engagement at Nixon's Apollo Theatre in Atlantic City, New Jersey, starting on Monday, August 4, 1919.

== West End production ==
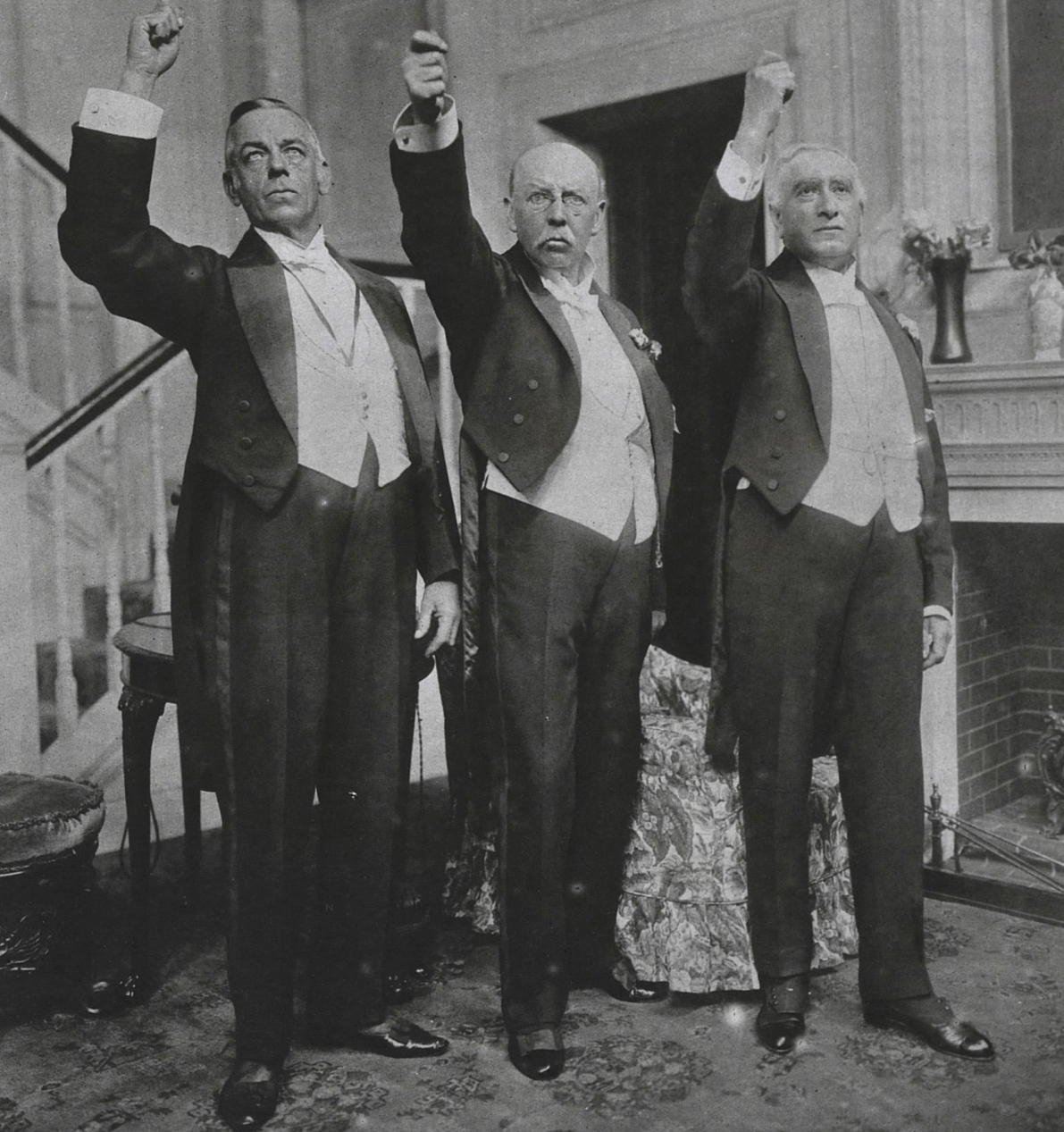

John Golden reportedly sold the UK rights for Three Wise Fools to André Charlot at the pier where his transatlantic steamer was docked. Winston Smith and Golden then entrusted Austin Strong with managing their interests in Charlot's London production. Strong sailed for England in May 1919, and by July 12, 1919, the play had its London premiere at the Comedy Theatre. The leads were Herbert Ross, Charles Glenney, and Arthur Lewis, with Margaret Bannerman and Pat Somerset as the young lovers. (Note: The latter's character name was changed in London from Gordon Schuyler, a renowned Nieuw Nederland surname, to Gordon Vail.) The reviewer for The Observer said Austin Strong had blended "the American crook play, the American play of sentiment, and (best of all) the American comedy of manners", creating satisfying entertainment. They also complemented both Pat Somerset and Margaret Bannerman on their performances as the young lovers, a prescient observation, for the two actors having met for the first time during rehearsals, married six weeks later.

Three Wise Fools continued running at the Comedy Theatre, with some change of cast, until February 1920, when it moved over to the Ambassadors for another two months of performances.

== Revival ==
William Gillette was already 82 when he starred in a one-week limited engagement of Three Wise Fools starting March 1, 1936. James Kirkwood and Charles Coburn were his co-stars, with Elizabeth Love and William Post Jr. as the young lovers. John Golden produced and Austin Strong directed the revival at the Golden Theatre.

== Adaptations ==
=== Film ===
- Three Wise Fools (1923)
- Three Wise Fools (1946)

== Bibliography ==
- Austin Strong. Three Wise Fools: A Comedy in Three Acts. Samuel French, 1919
