= Three Wise Fools (1946 film) =

1946 film by Edward Buzzell

- Directed by: Edward Buzzell
- Screenplay by: John McDermott; James O'Hanlon
- Story by: John McDermott
- Based on: Three Wise Fools; 1918 play by Austin Strong
- Produced by: William H. Wright
- Starring: Margaret O'Brien; Lionel Barrymore; Lewis Stone; Thomas Mitchell; Edward Arnold
- Cinematography: Harold Rosson
- Edited by: Gene Ruggiero; Theron Warth (uncredited)
- Music by: Bronislau Kaper
- Production company: Metro-Goldwyn-Mayer
- Distributed by: Loew's Inc.
- Release date: September 26, 1946
- Running time: 90 minutes
- Country: United States
- Language: English
- Budget: $1,274,000
- Box office: $2,096,000

Three Wise Fools is a 1946 American comedy drama film directed by Edward Buzzell and starring Margaret O'Brien, Lionel Barrymore, Lewis Stone, Edward Arnold, and Thomas Mitchell. It is somewhat loosely based on the 1918 Broadway play of the same name by Austin Strong and Winchell Smith, which had also been adapted to film in 1923, in a silent version directed by King Vidor. This version is different in several respects from the original play and earlier film, changing some characters and plot elements, notably introducing a group of small supernatural people, referred to at times as "fairies," "pixies" or "leprechauns," who live in an ancient tree on an American estate. Harry Davenport, who plays one of those beings, known as "The Ancient," was one of the lead characters in the 1918 play.

== Plot ==
The story is told as a flashback, narrated by a "fairy" named "The Ancient," who sits at the base of an ancient tree that is home to these creatures. The young ones do not believe in the existence of humans, so The Ancient tells a story about the power of belief. In 1870, Rena Fairchild, a young American woman, is courted by three men: Richard Gaughnt, James Trumbell, and Theodore Findley. She is swept off her feet, however, by a dashing Irishman, "the O'Monahan," and goes with him to Ireland, but not before the O'Monahan, insulted by her suitors, pronounces a "blessing" on the three, prophesying that each will achieve their materialistic dreams.

Forty years later, the three men live together in a large house. They have had great success in their respective careers - medicine for Gaughnt, the law for Trumbell, and banking for Findley - but are not especially well-liked in their community. They donate some land to the local university, not out of generosity, but to improve their public image.

Young girl Sheila O'Monahan, the orphaned granddaughter of the recently deceased Rena, arrives, accompanied by longtime family servant Terence Aloysius O'Davern, and informs the three men that they are supposed to take her in as an adopted goddaughter. Initially rejecting her, the three men discover they have made an embarrassing mistake: the land they donated actually belongs to Sheila, Rena's sole surviving descendent and heir. They take Sheila and O'Davern into their household, without telling her why they changed their minds.

Sheila believes in Irish magic and the supernatural beings said to live in the old tree on Rena's land, invoking them at times in Gaelic. Her devotion to the old men themselves begins to win over Gaughnt and Trumbell, though Findley looks for ways to steal back the deed. When they inform Sheila about their plans to build an amphitheater on the land and she learns that it would involve cutting down the tree, she rejects their plan. Findley hires a troop of performing midgets to pose as the "pixies" and to pretend that the tree is dying and that they are leaving.

When Sheila eventually discovers the hoax with O'Davern's help, her faith in people, as well as her faith in pixies, is lost. She runs away to a convent, announcing her intention to become a nun to the Mother Superior. Meanwhile, Gaughnt chains himself to the old tree to prevent its being cut down, and is joined by Trumbell. After being confronted by the Mother Superior, the three men, now remorseful, join Sheila near the tree and announce that they can now see the "little people" themselves, although only Sheila actually sees them. The three warmly decide to adopt her, and the tree is preserved.

== Cast ==
- Margaret O'Brien as Sheila O'Monahan
- Lionel Barrymore as Dr. Richard Gaughnt
- Lewis Stone as Judge James Trumbell
- Thomas Mitchell as Terence Aloysius O'Davern
- Edward Arnold as Theodore Findley
- Ray Collins as Judge Watson
- Jane Darwell as Sister Mary Brigid
- Charles Dingle as Paul Badger
- Harry Davenport as The Ancient
- Henry O'Neill as Prof. Horace Appleby
- Cyd Charisse as Rena Fairchild
- Warner Anderson as The O'Monahan
- Billy Curtis as Dugan
- Olin Howland as Witness (uncredited)

== Reception ==
The film was savagely reviewed in The New York Times by resident film critic Bosley Crowther, who described the adaptation as "Peter Panning" the original play with "quasi-Barrie mores," so that "it oozes the most egregious sentiment and drips verbal lollipops."

The film earned $1,633,000 in the US and Canada and $463,000 elsewhere, causing a loss of $66,000.
