= Whipsaw (film) =

1935 film by Sam Wood

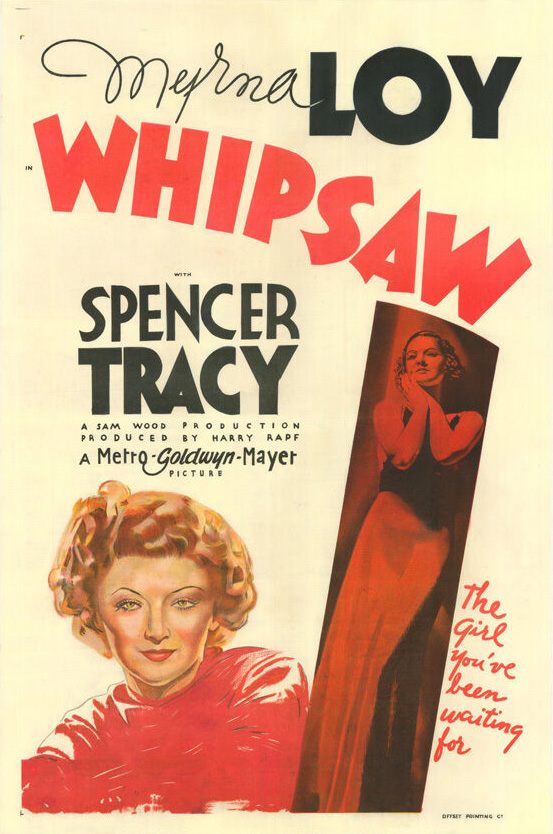
- Theatrical release poster by William Rose
- Directed by: Sam Wood
- Screenplay by: Howard Emmett Rogers
- Based on: The Whipsaw; 1934 story in Liberty by James Edward Grant
- Produced by: Sam Wood; Harry Rapf
- Starring: Myrna Loy; Spencer Tracy
- Cinematography: James Wong Howe
- Edited by: Basil Wrangell
- Music by: William Axt
- Production company: Metro-Goldwyn-Mayer
- Distributed by: Loew's, Inc.
- Release date: December 18, 1935 (US)
- Running time: 82 minutes
- Country: United States
- Language: English
- Budget: $238,000
- Box office: $965,000

Whipsaw is a 1935 American crime drama film directed by Sam Wood and starring Myrna Loy and Spencer Tracy. Written by Howard Emmett Rogers, based on a story by James Edward Grant, the film is about a government agent working undercover traveling across the country with an unsuspecting woman, hoping she will lead him to her gang of jewel thieves. The film was produced by Harry Rapf for Metro-Goldwyn-Mayer, and was released on December 18, 1935, in the United States.

== Plot ==
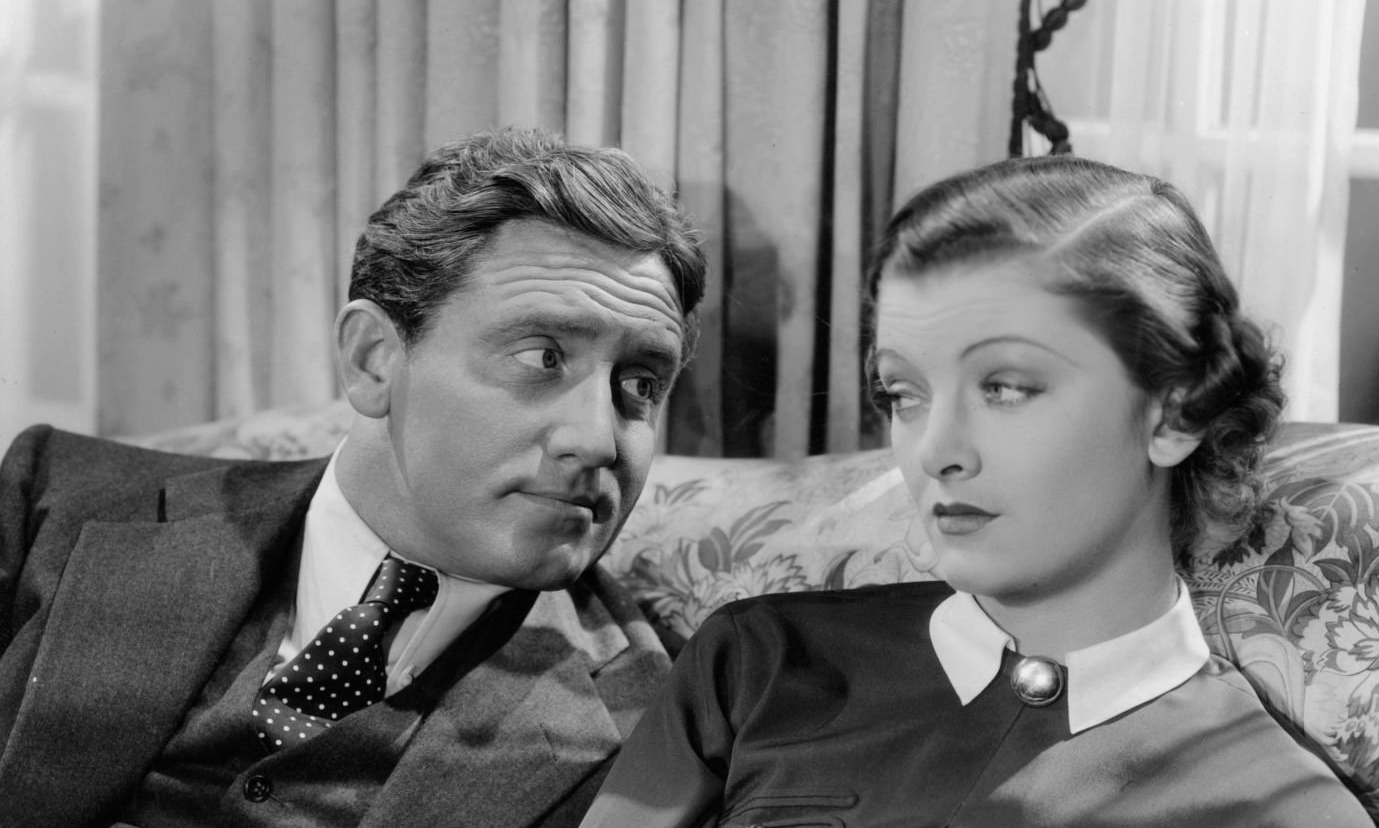
Spencer Tracy and Myrna Loy in Whipsaw

Thieves Ed Dexter and Harry Ames are trying to steal some pearls worth a literal fortune. When another gang, led by "Doc" Evans, tries to muscle in, Ed tips off the police. Free of their competition, Ed and Harry get what they were after. Authorities then connect Vivian, who had worked with Ed and Harry in the past, but not on this job, to the robbery. Gung ho government agent Ross McBride is assigned to get Vivian to lead him to her partners by pretending to be a crook named Danny Ackerman. However, Vivian quickly realizes Ross is a plant. Nonetheless, she plays along, buying time to shake the crooks following her.

On their travels, Ross and Vivian consistently have to pretend they are married to "keep up appearances". At one point bad weather forces them to stop at a farmhouse, where they help the distraught couple with the birth of twins. Ross and Vivian gradually fall in love. When he overhears her phoning Ed to tell him she is quitting her life of crime, and wants no part of their three-way split, he is emotionally and psychologically "whipsawn". He confesses to her that he is a government agent, but she reveals that she already knows. He then embraces her, accidentally dropping the dressing mirror he was holding, which breaks, revealing the pearls that Ed has hidden there without her knowledge. Ross assumes she was trying to make off with the entire haul herself, and does not believe her protestations of innocence.

Evans and his gang find Ed and Harry and force their plans of them at gunpoint. Then Evans, his associate Steve and Ed go to pick up the loot. Hearing the ruckus, Ross manages to toss the pearls out the window just before they break into the bedroom where he and Vivian are pretending to be a newly married couple. Vivian explains that they found the pearls, whereupon Ross, still posing as her "husband", a recently released ex-con, claims he hid them in St. Louis. They set out for the city. Ross suggests they stop at a roadside cafe for breakfast, then sends Vivian to the ladies' room for safety. He pulls out his hidden gun, and they all start shooting. Vivian warns him as Ed sneaks up and is just about to get a clear shot at him. The two men shoot each other. State troopers passing by gain control of the situation.

Afterward, recovering in a hospital bed, Ross has Vivian answer "yes" or "no" questions about the case in the presence of his boss and a stenographer making a record of her responses. In the process she exonerates herself of participation in the crime. He then tenders his badge in resignation. In turn, Vivian submits him to the same yes/no questioning, forcing him in admit he loves her. Before he can pop the big question he's anxious to ask, she preempts it by answering "Yes".

== Cast ==
- Myrna Loy as Vivian Palmer
- Spencer Tracy as Ross McBride / [Danny Ross Ackerman]
- Harvey Stephens as Ed Dexter
- William Harrigan as "Doc" Evans
- Clay Clement as Harry Ames
- Robert Gleckler as Steve Arnold
- Robert Warwick as Robert W. Wadsworth
- Georges Renavent as Monetta
- Paul Stanton as Chief Hughes
- Wade Boteler as Humphries
- Don Rowan as Curley
- John Qualen as [Will] Dabson
- Irene Franklin as Mme. Marie
- Lillian Leighton as Aunt Jane
- J. Anthony Hughes as Bailey
- William Ingersoll as Dr. Williams
- Charles Irwin as Larry King

== Production ==
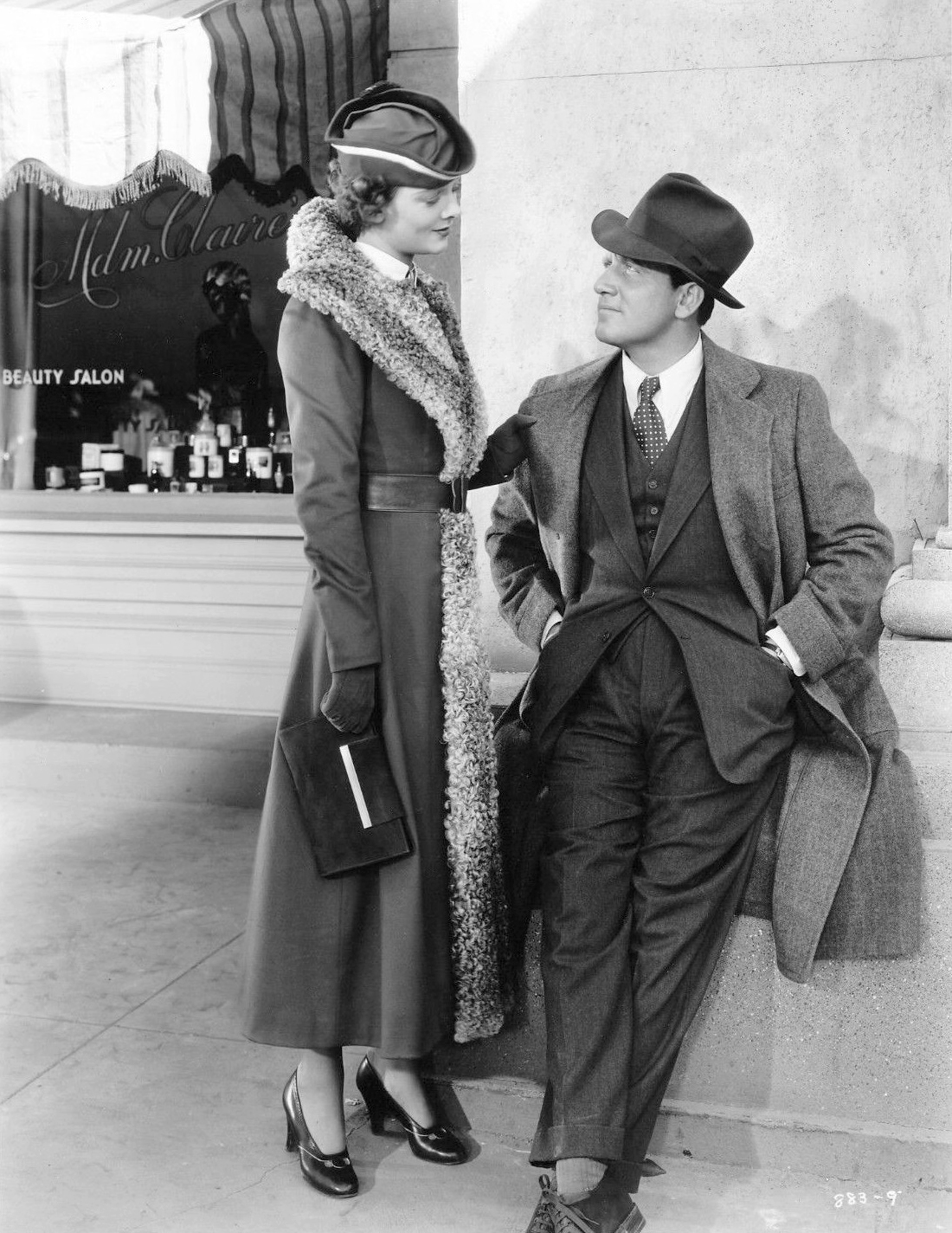
Loy and Tracy in Whipsaw

Initially the film was intended for the duo William Powell and Myrna Loy. When Powell proved unavailable, Spencer Tracy was called in. Originally, the title of this movie was Unexpected Bride.

Shooting dates were October 22 to November 20, 1935.

In one scene, Myrna Loy appears without makeup, her hair unkempt. MGM executive E.J. Mannix chastised cinematographer James Wong Howe for shooting her that way, as MGM had spent a bankroll glamorizing Loy. Finally the scene was cut.

It was noted that Myrna Loy and Spencer Tracy had an affair during the shooting, in the greatest secrecy. It was the first film of the two actors together. In her autobiography, Loy stated that Tracy, who had fallen in love with her, had harassed her during the filming. Rumors are that they had been romantically linked to the end of the filming, to resume a year later in Libeled Lady. Loy and Tracy would hide their affair.

== Reception ==
Frank Nugent, critic for The New York Times, described the film as "at once an effective melodrama and a pleasant love story." Though he found the premise not particularly original, he wrote that "Sam Wood has directed it at a brisk pace and with a rare knack of making the expected happen in the most unexpected way. Myrna Loy and Spencer Tracy demonstrate again that they are among the screen's most interesting players, and they are assisted most capably by the rest of the cast."

According to MGM records, the film earned $574,000 in the US and Canada and $391,000 elsewhere resulting in a profit of $404,000.

== In popular culture ==
The film is referenced in an episode of the American television sitcom Sanford and Son ("Whiplash", Season 2, Episode 2).
