= Helen Westley =

American actress (1875–1942)

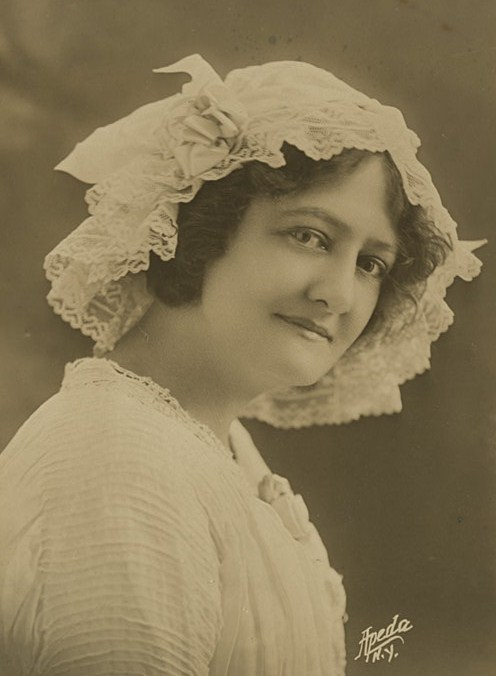
- Westley, c. 1915
- Born: Henrietta Remsen Meserole Manney; March 28, 1875; Brooklyn, New York, U.S.
- Died: December 12, 1942 (aged 67); Middlebush, New Jersey, U.S.
- Education: American Academy of Dramatic Arts
- Occupation: Actress
- Years active: 1892-1942
- Known for: Show Boat; Anne of Green Gables; Roberta; Green Grow the Lilacs; Rebecca of Sunnybrook Farm; Liliom; Death Takes a Holiday
- Spouse: John Westley (m. 1900; div. 1912)
- Children: 1

Helen Westley (born Henrietta Remsen Meserole Manney; March 28, 1875 – December 12, 1942) was an American character actress of stage and screen.

== Early years ==
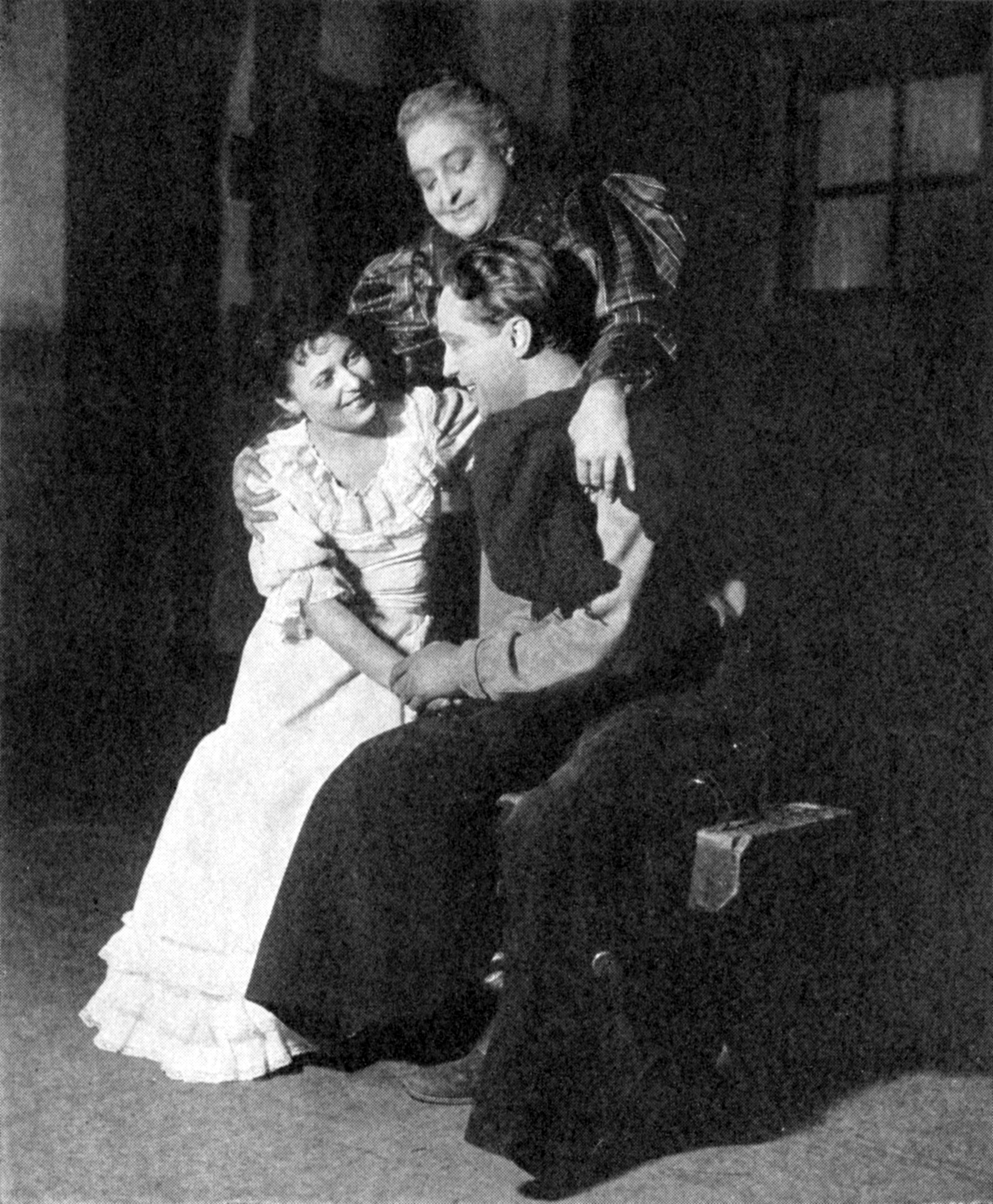
Westley (standing) with June Walker and Franchot Tone in the original 1931 Broadway production of Green Grow the Lilacs

Westley was born Henrietta Remsen Meserole Manney in Brooklyn, New York on March 28, 1875. She attended the American Academy of Dramatic Arts.

== Career ==
Westley's early career activities included performing in stock theater and in vaudeville around the United States. Her New York stage debut came on September 13, 1897, when she portrayed Angelina McKeagey in The Captain of the Nonesuch.

Westley was an organizer of the Washington Square Players, debuting with that group on February 19, 1915, as the Oyster in Another Interior. She was a founding member of the original board of the Theatre Guild, and appeared in many of its productions, among them Peer Gynt, and some of their productions of plays by George Bernard Shaw— Caesar and Cleopatra, Pygmalion, Heartbreak House, Major Barbara, The Doctor's Dilemma and The Apple Cart. She appeared in the original Broadway productions of two plays which, after her death, turned into classic Rodgers and Hammerstein musicals: Green Grow the Lilacs, which became Oklahoma!, and Liliom, which became Carousel. Westley played Aunt Eller in the former and Mrs. Muskat (who became Mrs. Mullin in Carousel) in the latter. She appeared in the original Broadway production of Eugene O'Neill's Strange Interlude.

Westley played roles, both comic and dramatic, in many films. They included Death Takes a Holiday, All This and Heaven Too, four films opposite child star Shirley Temple (including Dimples and Heidi), the 1934 surprise hit Anne of Green Gables, the 1935 film version of Roberta, and the 1936 film version of Show Boat, in which she replaced Edna May Oliver, when Oliver declined to repeat her stage role as Parthy Ann Hawks. She appeared in Rebecca of Sunnybrook Farm in 1938 with Shirley Temple and Randolph Scott as Aunt Miranda. In 1936, she played in Banjo on My Knee with Barbara Stanwyck, Walter Brennan and Buddy Ebsen. She starred as Grandma in The Primrose Path in 1939.

Westley's final film was My Favorite Spy.

== Personal life and death ==
Westley married John Westley, a Broadway actor, on October 31, 1900. The couple separated in 1912, with the marriage ending in divorce. The couple had one daughter, Ethel.

Westley retired from acting in 1942, and subsequently lived with Ethel at her daughter's home in Middlebush, New Jersey, until Westley's death from an undisclosed illness on December 12, 1942. She was cremated at the Rose Hill Cemetery in Linden, New Jersey. On December 17 of the same year, Ethel had her mother's ashes buried at Cypress Hills Cemetery in Brooklyn, New York, in Section 9, Lot 26 (the same site where Westley's mother and father were buried).

== Partial filmography ==
- Moulin Rouge (1934) - Mrs. Morris
- The House of Rothschild (1934) - Gudula Rothschild
- Looking for Trouble (1934) - Pearl's Landlady (uncredited)
- Death Takes a Holiday (1934) - Stephanie
- The Age of Innocence (1934) - Granny Mingott
- Anne of Green Gables (1934) - Marilla Cuthbert
- Captain Hurricane (1935) - Abbie Howland
- Roberta (1935) - Aunt Minnie aka Roberta
- Chasing Yesterday (1935) - Therese
- The Melody Lingers On (1935) - Franceska Manzoni
- Splendor (1935) - Mrs. Emmeline Lorrimore
- Show Boat (1936) - Parthenia "Parthy" Ann Hawks
- Half Angel (1936) - Mrs. Martha Hargraves
- Dimples (1936) - Mrs. Caroline Drew
- Banjo on My Knee (1936) - Grandma
- Stowaway (1936) - Mrs. Hope
- Café Metropole (1937) - Margaret Ridgeway
- Sing and Be Happy (1937) - Mrs. Henty
- Heidi (1937) - Blind Anna
- I'll Take Romance (1937) - Madame Della aka Madella
- She Married an Artist (1937) - Martha Moriarty
- The Baroness and the Butler (1938) - Countess Sandor
- Rebecca of Sunnybrook Farm (1938) - Aunt Miranda Wilkins
- Alexander's Ragtime Band (1938) - Aunt Sophie
- Keep Smiling (1938) - Mrs. Willoughby
- Zaza (1938) - Anais
- Wife, Husband and Friend (1939) - Mrs. Blair
- Lillian Russell (1940) - Grandma Leonard
- The Captain Is a Lady (1940) - Abigail Morrow
- All This, and Heaven Too (1940) - Madame LeMaire
- Lady with Red Hair (1940) - Mrs. Frazier
- Adam Had Four Sons (1941) - Cousin Philippa
- Lady from Louisiana (1941) - Blanche Brunot
- Sunny (1941) - Aunt Barbara
- Million Dollar Baby (1941) - Mrs. Galloway
- The Smiling Ghost (1941) - Grandmother Bentley
- Bedtime Story (1941) - Emma Harper
- My Favorite Spy (1942) - Aunt Jessie (final film role)
