= Half Angel (1936 film) =

1936 film by Sidney Lanfield

- Theatrical release poster
- Directed by: Sidney Lanfield
- Screenplay by: Gene Fowler; Bess Meredyth; Allen Rivkin
- Story by: F. Tennyson Jesse
- Produced by: Darryl F. Zanuck
- Starring: Frances Dee; Brian Donlevy; Charles Butterworth; Helen Westley; Henry Stephenson; Sara Haden
- Cinematography: Bert Glennon
- Edited by: Herbert Levy
- Production company: Twentieth Century-Fox
- Distributed by: Twentieth Century-Fox
- Release date: May 22, 1936
- Running time: 65 minutes
- Country: United States
- Language: English

Half Angel is a 1936 American comedy film directed by Sidney Lanfield and written by Gene Fowler, Bess Meredyth and Allen Rivkin. The film stars Frances Dee, Brian Donlevy, Charles Butterworth and was released on May 22, 1936 by Twentieth Century-Fox.

== Cast ==
- Frances Dee as Allison Lang
- Brian Donlevy as Duffy Giles
- Charles Butterworth as Doc Felix
- Helen Westley as Martha Hargraves
- Henry Stephenson as Prof. Jerome Hargraves
- Sara Haden as Henrietta Hargraves
- Etienne Girardot as Dr. Alexander Cotton
- Paul Stanton as District Attorney
- Gavin Muir as Dr. William Barth
- Julius Tannen as City Editor
- Nigel De Brulier as Dr. Hall
- Hilda Vaughn as Bertha
- Philip Sleeman as Carl
- William Ingersoll as Judge
- Paul McVey as Coroner
- Bruce Mitchell as Police Sergeant
