= Three Wise Fools (1923 film) =

1923 film directed by King Vidor

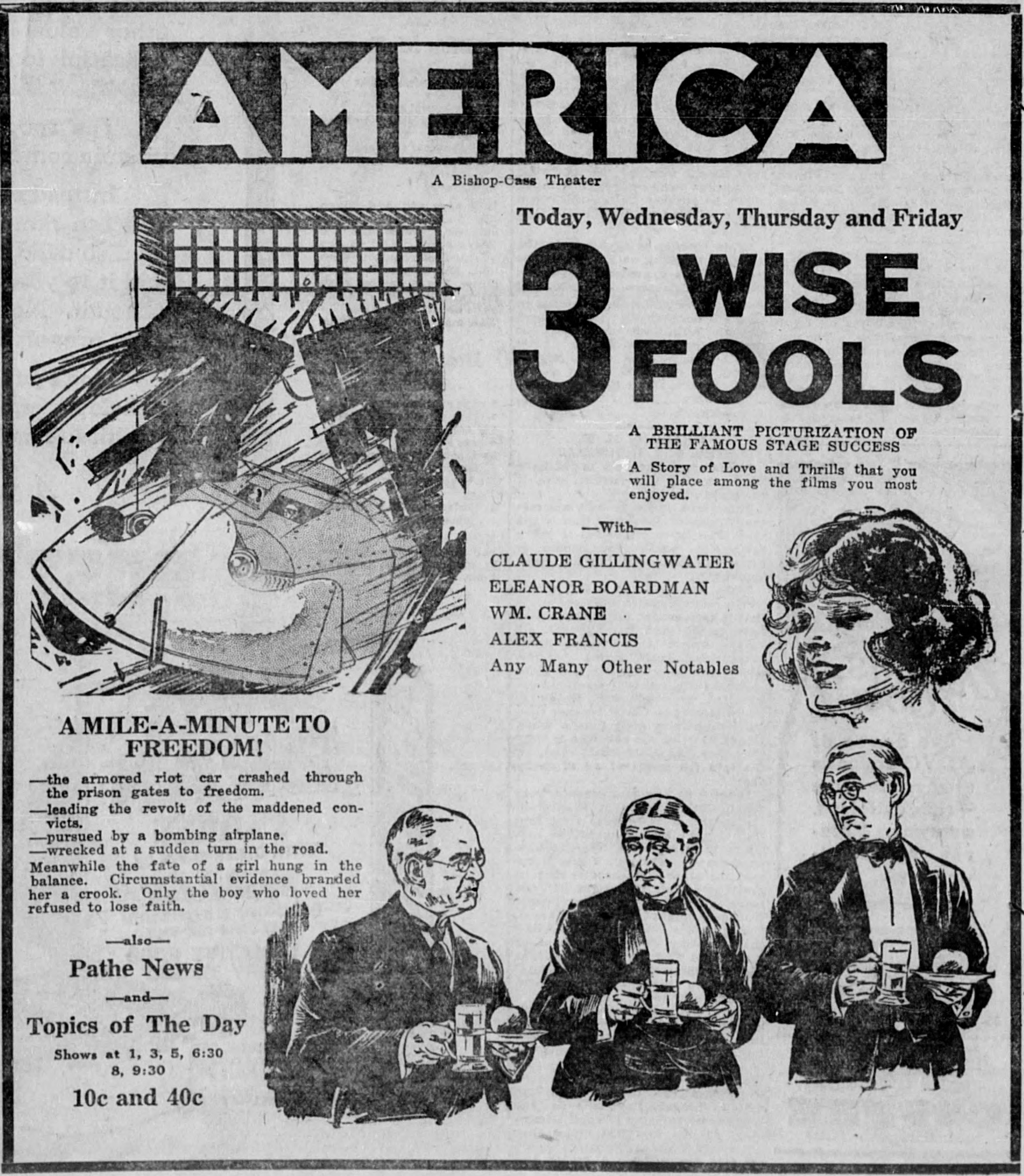
- Contemporary advertisement
- Directed by: King Vidor
- Written by: June Mathis (scenario); John McDermott (adaptation); James O'Hanlon (adaptation); Winchell Smith (play); King Vidor (scenario)
- Based on: Three Wise Fools, a Play In Three Acts; 1918 play by Austin Strong
- Starring: Claude Gillingwater
- Cinematography: Charles Van Enger
- Distributed by: Goldwyn Pictures
- Release date: August 19, 1923
- Running time: 70 minutes
- Country: United States
- Language: Silent (English intertitles)

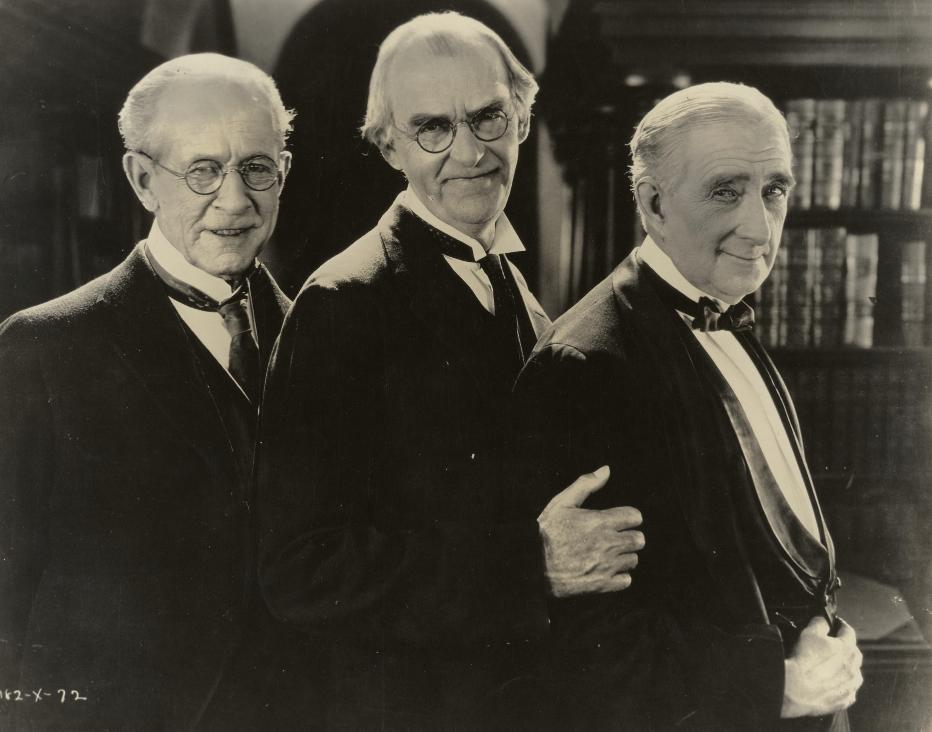
Publicity photo for the film depicting William H. Crane, Claude Gillingwater & Alec B. Francis.

Three Wise Fools (German title: Ein Mädchen und drei alte Narren) is a 1923 American silent drama film directed by King Vidor. A print of the film exists at the Cinematheque Royale de Belgique. It showed in Germany at the Union-Theater Nollendorf, Berlin, on November 10, 1924. The cinema was built in 1913 by Frank Joseph (Joe) Godsol, who was president of Goldwyn Pictures from 1922 to 1924.

== Plot ==
Three elderly—confirmed bachelors all—are unexpectedly visited by a young woman who announces herself as the daughter of the lady that all three men had once been in love with. When the girl is falsely suspected of involvement with a robbery, the old men come to her aid and the real culprit is ultimately apprehended.

== Cast ==
- Claude Gillingwater as Theodore Findley
- Eleanor Boardman as Rena Fairchild/Sydney Fairfield
- William H. Crane as Hon. James Trumbull
- Alec B. Francis as Dr. Richard Gaunt
- John St. Polis as John Crawshay (as John Sainpolis)
- William Haines as Gordon Schuyler
- Lucien Littlefield as Douglas
- ZaSu Pitts as Mickey
- Martha Mattox as Saunders
- Creighton Hale as Young Trumbull
- Raymond Hatton as Young Gaunt

== Production ==
One of producer Samuel Goldwyn’s many outstanding literary acquisitions, Three Wise Fools was written by playwrights Austin Strong and Winchell Smith. Vidor approached the “prestigious property” with alacrity. He would make one more film for Samuel Goldwyn Productions, Wild Oranges (1924) shortly before Goldwyn’s outfit was absorbed by Louis B. Mayer under Metro-Goldwyn-Mayer studios.

Three Wise Fools is noted as an early high-profile role for the then-up and coming William Haines. Haines would later recall that he felt distracted by the top hat he wears in the film and, as a result, felt that his performance was terrible. However, his performance received positive notices in contemporary reviews, and Haines was offered a choice of four new film roles after the film's success.[3] The other members of the movie cast also enjoyed successful careers, including Eleanor Boardman, Creighton Hale, Raymond Hatton, Zazu Pitts and Claude Gillingwater, the only cast member from the original 1918 Broadway play.

It showed in Germany at the Union-Theater Nollendorf, Berlin, on November 10, 1924.[4] The cinema was built in 1913 by Joe Goldsoll, aka F. J. Godsol, who was president of Goldwyn Pictures from 1922-1924.[5]

== Reception ==
Moving Picture World wrote approvingly “King Vidor has reproduced the atmosphere, comedy and romance [of the stageplay] with great success, and elaborated considerably on the suspense angle.”
