= Theatre Guild on the Air (radio series) =

American radio dramatic anthology series (1945–1953)

Theatre Guild on the Air is an American dramatic anthology radio series that was broadcast on ABC from September 9, 1945, until June 5, 1949, and on NBC from September 11, 1949, to June 7, 1953. The name was sometimes seen as Theater Guild on the Air. Comments accompanying the Peabody Award that the program received cited "the admirable casting, ... unerring choice of plays, and ... craftsmanship with which these plays are adapted". It was the only radio series whose episodes were adapted only from stage plays.

== Background ==
George Kondolf, an employee of the Batten, Barton, Durstine & Osborn advertising agency (BBDO), persuaded the board of directors of United States Steel to sponsor a radio program. The board's agreement for sponsorship was accompanied by a desire for the country's best performers to appear on the show. Kondolf and his long-time friend Homer Fickett, who also worked at BBDO and had directed some of radio's top programs, decided that the best access to such talent was through the Theatre Guild. Collaboration between the agency and the guild resulted in creation of Theatre Guild on the Air. U.S. Steel had not previously advertised on radio.

== Overview ==
Publicity for the series began three months prior to its debut. Newspaper articles published in early June 1945 contained statements such as "The Theatre Guild is coming to the radio." Reports said that the program would not be limited to the Guild's own productions; "the finest actors and actresses in America" would be featured (when possible, those who created each play's characters) in the entire theater's most popular productions. After the end of the first season, Radio Life magazine said, "It offered the finest in dramatic entertainment from the greatest plays in legitimate theatre."

Radio historian John Dunning described the program as "a 60-minute package of prestige drama aimed at putting 'unadulterated' theater on radio", although he acknowledged that sometimes accommodations had to be made in the adaptation process.

The premiere episode, "Wings over Europe", starred Burgess Meredith. Originally presented on stage by the Guild in 1928, the play had been considered "a prophetic story of the atomic bomb", and it "was called a fantasy". Use of atomic bombs in World War II prompted the Guild to revive the play for radio. Subsequent episodes were diversified, including comedies, dramas, melodramas, and musicals.

Lawrence Langner was the host. The announcer was George Hicks, and the "Voice of U. S. Steel" was Norman Brokenshire. Harold Levey and his orchestra provided music.

== Production ==
=== Personnel ===
Armina Marshall was head of the Guild's radio department. Supervisory directors of the series were Theresa Helburn and Langner. The initial producer was Kondolf. Carol Irwin became the producer in 1946 to begin the second season. She resigned in June 1949. Fickett was the director. His technique for working with the well-known stars featured on the program included using "only a few well-chosen words" to ensure that "they must keep their temperament under control". Although the cast made a recording before the actual broadcast, he made actors wait until after the episode went off the air to listen to the recording. He felt that an actor's hearing his own performance was "the worst thing in the world".

In addition to Fickett's work as director, in September 1949 he became the person who introduced each play and gave a preview of the next week's production. A review in The New York Times said, "He speaks clearly and non-theatrically and avoids excessive verbiage, which makes him practically a model presiding officer."

=== Adaptations ===
Radio's time constraints necessitated reduction of plays' contents from what was presented on stage. Fickett emphasized the importance of maintaining the gist of the original production. "We don't merely cut," he said. "We adapt. We eliminate secondary characters and incidents ... however, the story and the characterization are there." Prior to the beginning of the program's second season the Guild decided to use well-known playwrights to adapt plays for the broadcasts. Playwrights who were assigned adaptations included Robert Anderson, Erik Barnouw, Denis Johnston, Welbourne Kelly, John Latouche, Kenyon Nicholson, and Virginia Radcliffe. A tie-in anthology was published containing 12 radio scripts, followed by a bound collection of specially produced programs for 13 episodes:

- Theatre Guild on the Air (1947) edited by H. William Fitelson
- U.S. Steel Hour Theatre Guild on the Air Programs (1952)

=== Schedule ===
The program debuted on ABC on Sundays from 10 to 11 p.m. Eastern Time, carried coast-to-coast on 194 stations. When its third season began on September 7, 1947, it was moved to 9:30 to 10:30 p.m. E. T. Its last broadcast on ABC was on June 5, 1949. Beginning on September 11, 1949, it was on NBC on Sundays from 8:30 to 9:30 p.m. E. T. The New York Times reported, "For some time United States Steel has been anxious to acquire an earlier evening spot" for the program. The series ended with the June 7, 1953, episode. U. S. Steel announced that decision in May 1953, saying that it would instead sponsor a new television dramatic series that was scheduled to begin in the fall of 1953. The cancellation ended the company's eight-year sponsorship of Theatre Guild on the Air.

=== Sites ===
The premiere episode originated from the Ritz Theatre, but most of the broadcasts originated from the Vanderbilt Theatre in New York City with an invited audience present. The February 29, 1948, broadcast originated from Constitution Hall to coincide with the launching of the American Red Cross's 1948 drive. The intermission included an address by President Harry Truman. The April 10, 1949, episode was presented from the Civic Opera House in Chicago. Almost 4,000 teachers of English and drama in schools in and around Chicago were guests for the broadcast. Other venues that were used for the series included Municipal Auditorium in Birmingham, Alabama.

== Episodes ==
=== 1945-1946 ===
Partial List of Episodes of Theatre Guild on the Air in 1945-1946
Date	Episode	Stars
September 9, 1945	"Wings over Europe"	Burgess Meredith
October 7, 1945	"Ah, Wilderness!"	Walter Huston
October 21, 1945	"Sing Out, Sweet Land"	Burl Ives, Josh White
November 4, 1945	"Storm over Patsy"	Martha Scott, Aline MacMahon, Richard Widmark
December 2, 1945	"Elizabeth the Queen"	Alfred Lunt, Lynn Fontanne
May 12, 1946	"Payment Deferred"	Charles Laughton, Edward Marr, Elsa Lanchester, Franklyn Parker, Gale Gordon

=== 1946-1947 ===
Partial List of Episodes of Theatre Guild on the Air in 1946-1947
Date	Episode	Stars
September 8, 1946	"Angel Street"	Helen Hayes, Victor Jory, Leo G. Carroll
November 24, 1946	"Burlesque"	June Havoc, Bert Lahr, Tony Ross
January 12, 1947	"The Male Animal"	Elliott Nugent, Paul Douglas, Martha Scott
January 19, 1947	"A Doll's House"	Dorothy McGuire, Basil Rathbone, Roland Winters
April 20, 1947	"The Age of Innocence"	Gene Tierney, Arthur Kennedy
May 4, 1947	"The Animal Kingdom"	Fred Astaire, Wendy Barrie
May 11, 1947	"Macbeth"	Maurice Evans, Judith Anderson
May 18, 1947	"Uncle Harry"	Paul Henreid, Geraldine Fitzgerald, Mildred Dunnock
May 25, 1947	"Ethan Frome"	Raymond Massey, Pauline Lord, Mary Anderson
June 8, 1947	"A Church Mouse"	Basil Rathbone, Pamela Brown
June 22, 1947	"Old Acquaintance"	Ilka Chase, Dorothy Gish

=== 1947-1948 ===
Partial List of Episodes of Theatre Guild on the Air in 1947-1948
Date	Episode	Stars
September 7, 1947	"One Sunday Afternoon"	James Stewart, Haila Stoddard, Augusta Dabney, Leon Janney, Roger Pryor
November 23, 1947	"The Straw"	Mary Anderson, Robert Mitchum
November 30, 1947	"Old English"	Charles Laughton, Dorothy Hamilton
December 7, 1947	"The Wisdom Tooth"	Gene Kelly
January 4, 1948	"The Little Foxes"	Agnes Moorehead, Tallulah Bankhead, Thomas Mitchell, Zachary Scott
February 29, 1948	"The Barretts of Wimpole Street"	Madeleine Carroll, Brian Aherne

=== 1948-1949 ===
Partial List of Episodes of Theatre Guild on the Air in 1948-1949
Date	Episode	Stars
October 17, 1948	"Laura"	June Duprez, Burt Lancaster, George Coulouris
December 5, 1948	"Lovers and Friends"	Walter Pidgeon, Madeleine Carroll
April 10, 1949	"The Taming of the Shrew"	Burgess Meredith, Joyce Redman

=== 1949-1950 ===
Partial List of Episodes of Theatre Guild on the Air in 1949-1950
Date	Episode	Stars
September 11, 1949	"Dream Girl"	Betty Field, John Lund
November 13, 1949	"Still Life"	Helen Hayes, David Niven
December 4, 1949	"The Amazing Dr. Clitterhouse"	Basil Rathbone, Madeleine Carroll
December 18, 1949	"The Browning Version"	Maurice Evans, Edna Best

=== 1950-1951 ===
Partial List of Episodes of Theatre Guild on the Air in 1950-1951
Date	Episode	Stars
September 10, 1950	"Edward, My Son"	Rosalind Russell, Charles Laughton
January 28, 1951	"The Morning Glory"	Anne Baxter, John Hodiak
March 4, 1951	"Hamlet"	John Gielgud, Dorothy McGuire, Pamela Brown

=== 1951-1952 ===
Partial List of Episodes of Theatre Guild on the Air in 1951-1952
Date	Episode	Stars
September 9, 1951	"The Heiress"	Basil Rathbone, Cornell Wilde, Betty Field
September 16, 1951	"The Glass Menagerie"	Helen Hayes, Montgomery Clift
October 21, 1951	"Pygmalion"	Alfred Lunt, Lynn Fontanne
January 6, 1952	"I Know My Love"	Alfred Lunt, Lynn Fontanne
February 24, 1952	"Oliver Twist"	Basil Rathbone, Boris Karloff

=== 1952-1953 ===
Partial List of Episodes of Theatre Guild on the Air in 1952-1953
Date	Episode	Stars
November 2, 1952	"Lo and Behold"	Basil Rathbone, Ann Blyth, Jeffrey Lynn
November 23, 1952	"That Winslow Boy"	Basil Rathbone, Alan Webb, Margaret Philips
January 11, 1953	"Jane"	Michael Redgrave, Edna Best
January 18, 1953	"Trial by Forgery"	Anne Baxter, Joseph Cotten
January 25, 1953	"The Scarlet Letter"	Dorothy McGuire, Cedric Hardwicke
February 1, 1953	"Reflected Glory"	Bette Davis, Macdonald Carey
February 15, 1953	"Cass Timberlane"	Fredric March, Nina Foch
March 8, 1953	"Vanity Fair"	Joan Fontaine
April 26, 1953	"1984"	Richard Widmark

== Critical response ==
=== 1946 ===
In a review in The New York Times, Jack Gould expressed disappointment at the play presented in the show's second-season debut. He wrote that "Angel Street" was produced "with the Guild's usual care", but the problem was "the curse of familiarity" (despite the quality of the episode's stars) because adaptations of that play and its film version had been presented so often on radio.

=== 1947 ===
A review of the Guild's production of "Macbeth" in the trade publication Billboard questioned whether radio was a suitable medium for Shakespeare's plays. Noting that he "wrote to be seen as well as heard", the review said that the adaptation "seemed curiously one dimensional". The review included compliments for the writer, actors, narration, and music but concluded by saying, "However, it seems to this reporter that Macbeth airs best as a noble experiment. It must be seen to be appreciated."

=== 1948 ===
The National Council of Teachers of English said in 1948 that Theatre Guild on the Air did the most "to further listeners' understanding and appreciation of our literary heritage and to awaken a greater love of good writing." The council also commended the Guild and the sponsor for the way plays were adapted for "the aural medium".

=== 1949 ===
Gould wrote in The New York Times that "Dream Girl", the debut episode for the season, suffered from technical difficulties related to adapting the play to radio. In particular, the review said that transitions between dreams and reality, which were evident on stage via lighting and setting, were difficult to perceive via radio. It commended Betty Field's performance in the title role while acknowledging that the adaptation to radio limited her abilities in comparison to her stage performance in that role.

=== 1951 ===
A review by Gould of the 1951 presentation of "Hamlet" called the 90-minute production "A refreshing departure from the dramatic norm on the airways and a commendably ambitious effort". However, the review also described the episode as more a spoken version of the play than a performed one. It noted the limitations imposed by radio as Hamlet's role frequently seemed to be diminished, players were often difficult to identify, and "The play within the play and the final death scene were lost in a babble of confusing voices."

A review of that same episode in The New Republic said, "the Guild outdid itself". The review acknowledged some flaws in the production, such as Polonius's performance and the play within the play, but it said, "This was radio at its best." The reviewer included a comment from a fellow listener: "This is surprising; I don't even miss the stage, the people, the scenery, the lights. I can see them all — through this radio."

=== 1952 ===
A brief review in the trade publication Billboard said that the episode "I Know My Love" was "a great waste of top talent and time". The review said that the stage version of the play was dull and that lack of visual elements made the radio version more so, because of the inability to see the transition of a husband and wife "from youth to their Golden Wedding anniversary".

== Recognition ==
- 1945 - Radio Life magazine - Most Unique Contribution to Radio
- 1946 - Institute for Education by Radio - Cultural Award
- 1947 - Radio Editors' Popularity Poll - Top Dramatic Program
- 1946 - Dramatics, the educational magazine for directors, teachers, and students of dramatic arts - The Radio Program of the Month
- 1948 - Peabody Award - Drama
- 1948 - National Council of Teachers of English - "best literature on the air"
- 1950 - Motion Picture Daily poll of radio and TV editors of magazines and newspapers - Radio's best dramatic program
- 1951 - Motion Picture Daily poll of radio columnists, critics, and editors of magazines and newspapers - Radio's best dramatic program
- 1951 - Academy of Radio and Television Arts and Sciences - Best Radio Dramatic Program
- 1952 - Radio and Television Daily - Outstanding dramatic program of the year

== Recording ==
RCA Victor released a recording of the program's "Hamlet" episode, starring John Gielgud, Dorothy McGuire, and Pamela Brown.
