= Homer Fickett =

American radio director (1897 or 1898 - 1953)

Homer Fickett (1897 or 1898 - November 2, 1953) was an American radio director, advertising executive, and journalist. An Associated Press newspaper article called him "a magnet for the creative force in actors", and an article distributed by the International News Service described him as "probably the most colorful" director on radio.

== Early years ==
Born in Rochester, New York, Fickett was the son of Mr. and Mrs. Frederick Woodbury Fickett. His brother, Kenneth, also had a career in radio. When Fickett was a small boy, he staged shows in cellars and barns. One of the costumes that he used was an old dress, which he kept over the years and eventually passed down to his daughter, who later became an actress. He graduated from West High School in Rochester.

== Career ==
Fickett worked on the Rochester Herald and the Democrat and Chronicle in Rochester, New York. He joined the city staff of the Buffalo Courier in the fall of 1920. In January 1925 he moved from being editor of the Dunlop Tire & Rubber Company's Dunlop News to work on the staff of the Buffalo Evening Post.

Fickett's favorite newspaper job, drama critic, influenced the rest of his career. He went from Buffalo to Philadelphia, where he joined the staff of the Young & Rubicam advertising agency. His bosses there assigned him to provide an assessment of the potential of advertising in the then-new medium of radio. He gained expertise about radio and began writing, producing, and directing programs. He moved to New York and became the radio specialist for the Batten, Barton, Durstine & Osborn agency (BBD&O).

Ficket began directing on radio in 1928. He differed from many of his counterparts in that before he began directing radio programs he had never been an actor, a stage director, or a film director. He was the producer of This Is My Best and assistant director of The March of Time. He was the director of Cavalcade of America and wrote for that program at times. An article in The Pittsburgh Press called him "one of radio's greatest directors". When United States Steel, one of BBD&O's clients, decided to sponsor a radio program that would feature top performers, Fickett and his long-time friend George H. Kondolf were designated to be director and producer, respectively. Eventually he left the agency to focus his energies on radio.

In September 1949, when Theatre Guild on the Air returned for a new season, Fickett became the person who introduced each play and gave a preview of the next week's production in addition to his work as the program's director. A comment in The New York Times said, "He speaks clearly and non-theatrically and avoids excessive verbiage, which makes him practically a model presiding officer."

Fickett twice received the Michael Award as radio's best producer-director. Shortly before his death, he was appointed as a consultant for The United States Steel Hour television program.

After he began his radio career, Fickett directed some plays in regional theater in New England.

=== Perspectives ===
Fickett dismissed the idea that good plays, from writers such as Shakespeare, Ibsen and O'Neill, could not succeed on radio. In July 1947 he noted the increase in ratings for Guild during its two years on the air: "We started at three and are now around 10." As director, Fickett prevented personality-related problems from affecting work on Theatre Guild on the Air. A story distributed by the Associated Press in 1950 said that Fickett "needs to say only a few well-chosen words to persuade gently the most glamorous of Hollywood, Broadway and Piccadilly stars that they must keep their temperament under control if they are to do their performances in the short time allotted them on the air".

== Personal life and death ==
Fickett married Mary Stewart in Buffalo in 1925 while both worked at the Buffalo Courier. They had a daughter, Mary, who was an actress. He died on November 2, 1953, in St. Luke's Hospital in New York City, aged 55.
