= The Masque of Kings =

- First edition, 1937
- Original language: English
- Written by: Maxwell Anderson
- Genre: Drama
- Setting: Study of Emperor Franz Joseph, room in apartments of Crown Prince Rudolph in Hofburg Palace, Vienna

Premiere
- Date: February 8, 1937
- Place: Shubert Theatre; New York City, New York

The Masque of Kings is a 1937 three-act drama written by Maxwell Anderson. It was produced on Broadway by the Theatre Guild and directed by Philip Moeller. Lee Simonson created the scenic and costume design. It ran for 89 performances from February 8, 1937 - April 24, 1937 at the Shubert Theatre.

== Cast ==
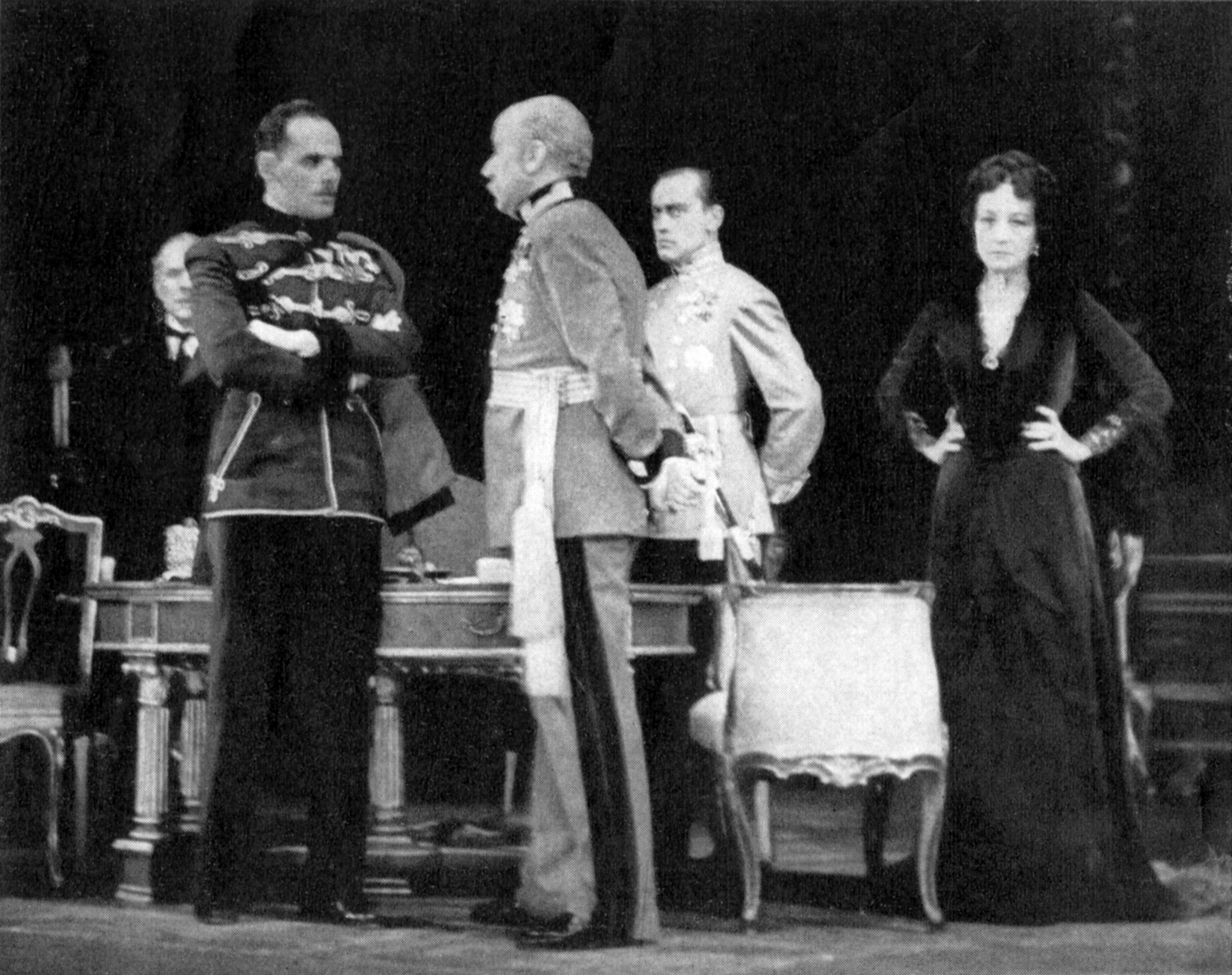
Cast of The Masque of Kings, from left: Henry Hull, Dudley Digges, Joseph Holland and Pauline Frederick

- Glenn Anders as Koinoff
- Edith Atwater as Baronin von Neustadt
- Leo G. Carroll as Count Joseph Hoyos
- Dudley Digges as Emperor Franz Joseph of Austria-Hungary
- Bijou Fernandez as Marie
- Pauline Frederick as Empress Elizabeth of Austria-Hungary
- Alan Hewitt as Fritz von Bremer
- Herbert Yost as Count Taafe
- Margo as Baroness Mary Vetsera
- Henry Hull as Crown Prince Rudolph of Austria-Hungary
- Henry Hull Jr. as Bratfish
- Pierre Chace as a servant
- Frank Downing as an officer
- Wyrley Birch as Sceps
- Edward Broadley as Loschek
- Charles Holden as a soldier
- Joseph Holland as Archduke John of Tuscany
- John Hoysradt as Baron von Neustadt
- Catherine Lawrence as a maid
- Benjamin Otis as D'Orsy
- Hobart Skidmore as a soldier
- Elizabeth Young as Louise
