= The United States Steel Hour =

Television series

- Rod Serling's The Rack, a production of The United States Steel Hour on April 12, 1955, was later published in this 1957 Bantam paperback.
- Also known as: Theater Guild on the Air
- Genre: Anthology drama
- Written by: Various writers
- Directed by: Various directors
- Presented by: Lawrence Langner, Roger Pryor
- Starring: Broadway and Hollywood actors
- Country of origin: United States
- Original language: English
- No. of seasons: 10

Production
- Executive producers: Armina Marshall, George Lowther
- Producers: George Kondolf, Carol Irwin
- Running time: 60 minutes
- Production company: Theatre Guild

Original release
- Network: ABC (09/09/45-06/05/49); NBC (09/11/49-06/07/53)
- Release: 1953 – 1963

The United States Steel Hour is an anthology series which brought hour-long dramas to television from 1953 to 1963. The television series and the radio program that preceded it were both sponsored by the United States Steel Corporation (U.S. Steel).

== Theatre Guild on the Air ==
The series originated on radio in the 1940s as Theatre Guild on the Air. Organized in 1919 to improve the quality of American theater, the Theatre Guild first experimented with radio productions in Theatre Guild Dramas, a CBS series which ran from December 6, 1943 to February 29, 1944.

Actress-playwright Armina Marshall (1895–1991), a co-administrator of the Theatre Guild, headed the Guild's newly created Radio Department, and in 1945, Theatre Guild on the Air embarked on its ambitious plan to bring Broadway theater to radio with leading actors in major productions. It premiered September 9, 1945 on ABC with Burgess Meredith, Henry Daniell and Cecil Humphreys in Wings Over Europe, a play by Robert Nichols and Maurice Browne which the Theatre Guild had staged on Broadway in 1928–29.

Within a year the series drew 10 to 12 million listeners each week. Presenting both classic and contemporary plays, the program was broadcast for eight years before it became a television series.

Playwrights adapted to radio ranged from Shakespeare and Oscar Wilde to Eugene O'Neill and Tennessee Williams. Numerous Broadway and Hollywood stars acted in the series, including Ingrid Bergman, Ronald Colman, Bette Davis, Rex Harrison, Helen Hayes, Katharine Hepburn, Gene Kelly, Deborah Kerr, Sam Levene, Agnes Moorehead, Basil Rathbone, Charles Tyner and Mary Sinclair. One notable performance was John Gielgud as Hamlet, in an expanded 90-minute broadcast with Dorothy McGuire as Ophelia. Fredric March was heard in his only performance as Cyrano de Bergerac, a role he played neither onstage or onscreen. The series also featured the only radio broadcast of Rodgers and Hammerstein's flop musical, Allegro.

The radio series was broadcast until June 7, 1953, when U.S. Steel decided to move the show to television.

The September 8, 1946, episode was "Angel Street", starring Hayes, Victor Jory, and Leo G. Carroll.

== Television overview ==
The Adventures of Huckleberry Finn was a musical production for The United States Steel Hour on November 20, 1957, with (l to r) Jimmy Boyd, Basil Rathbone, Jack Carson.

The television version aired from October 27, 1953, to 1955 on ABC, and from 1955 to 1963 on CBS. Like its radio predecessor, it was a live dramatic anthology series. Although episodes were normally dramatic productions, the series occasionally presented a musical program or a comedy.

While most episodes were broadcast live, some were taped. At least one combined the methods, as on April 6, 1960, Robert Loggia had three roles in an episode. The segments in which he played a 45-year-old man and his 22-year-old son were done live, while between them the segment in which he portrayed an 80-year-old uncle was on tape.

By its final year in 1963, it was the last surviving live anthology series from the Golden Age of Television. It was still on the air during President John F. Kennedy's famous April 11, 1962, confrontation with steel companies over the hefty raising of their prices. The show featured a range of television acting talent, and its episodes explored a wide variety of contemporary social issues, from the mundane to the controversial.

Notable guest star actors included Martin Balsam, Tallulah Bankhead, Ralph Bellamy, James Dean, Dolores del Río, Keir Dullea, Bennye Gatteys, Andy Griffith, Dick Van Dyke, Harrison, Celeste Holm, Sally Ann Howes, Jack Klugman, Sam Levene, Peter Lorre, Walter Matthau, Paul Newman, George Peppard, Janice Rule, Albert Salmi, George Segal, Jamie Smith, Suzanne Storrs, and Johnny Washbrook. Washbrook played Johnny Sullivan in The Roads Home in his first ever screen role. Griffith made his onscreen debut in the show's production of No Time for Sergeants, and would reprise the lead role in the 1958 big screen adaptation. In 1956–57, Read Morgan made his television debut on the Steel Hour as a young boxer in two episodes titled "Sideshow". Child actor Darryl Richard, later of The Donna Reed Show, also made his acting debut in the episode "The Bogey Man", which aired January 18, 1955. On August 17, 1955, in her series debut, Janice Rule played the titular protagonist–and actor Jamie Smith her "likable, solid-type fiancé"–in the episode "The Bride Cried". In 1960, Johnny Carson starred with Anne Francis in "Queen of the Orange Bowl".

Many notable writers contributed episodes, including Ira Levin, Richard Maibaum and Rod Serling. The program also broadcast one-hour musical versions of The Adventures of Tom Sawyer and The Adventures of Huckleberry Finn. The latter was broadcast on November 20, 1957, with a cast including Jimmy Boyd, Earle Hyman, Basil Rathbone, Jack Carson and Florence Henderson. Boyd had previously played Finn in the earlier telecast of Tom Sawyer.

Jackson Beck was the announcer when the program was on ABC.

=== Debuts ===
Debuts that occurred during the series's run included:

- Imogene Coca's dramatic debut (April 11, 1956)
- Griffith's TV debut (March 15, 1955)
- Gene Hackman's TV debut (April 22, 1959)
- Shari Lewis's "drama debut for grownups" (July 12, 1961)
- Robert Morley's American TV debut (December 7, 1955)
- Patti Page's acting debut (June 19, 1957)
- Richard's acting debut (January 18, 1955)

== Broadcast schedule ==
On ABC the program was broadcast from 9:30 to 10:30 p.m. on alternate Tuesdays. Episodes were distributed live on 76 network affiliates and by kinescope on 31 others. The latter status caused a problem because "The television rights to a story property cannot be obtained in certain cases if the program is to be televised in some areas by delayed film broadcasts." During its first season on television, the program alternated bi-weekly with The Motorola Television Hour, which was replaced by Center Stage June 1, 1954 - September 21, 1954. The Elgin Hour became the alternate program in October 1954.

NBC and CBS tried to obtain the series, and CBS succeeded with the ability to have it carried live on 115 affiliates. The series's last ABC broadcast was on June 21, 1955. Its CBS debut was at 10 p.m. E. T. on July 6, 1955, alternating with Front Row Center. In later years it alternated with Armstrong Circle Theatre. It ended on June 12, 1963.

== Episodes ==
=== 1953–1954 ===
Partial List of Episodes of The United States Steel Hour
Date	Title	Actor(s)
October 27, 1953	"P. O. W."	Richard Kiley, Gary Merrill, Phyllis Kirk.
November 10, 1953	"Hope for a Harvest"	Faye Emerson, Robert Preston
November 24, 1953	"Tin Wedding"	Phyllis Thaxter, Eddie Albert, Audrey Christie
December 8, 1953	"The Man in Possession"	Rex Harrison, Lilli Palmer
December 22, 1953	"Vanishing Point"	Peter Lorre, Viveca Lindfors, Claude Dauphin
January 5, 1954	"Hedda Gabler"	Tallulah Bankhead, Luther Adler, John Baragrey, Eugenia Rawls
January 19, 1954	"The Rise of Carthage"	Nina Foch, Paul Douglas
February 2, 1954	"Papa Is All"	Walter Slezak, Jessie Royce Landis
February 16, 1954	"Highway"	Diana Lynn, Kevin McCarthy
March 2, 1954	"Morning Star"	Gertrude Berg, Oscar Karlweis Marilyn Erskine, Jo Van Fleet, Sidney Armin, Fred Sadoff, Pat Breslin, Hal Gary, Anatole Winogradof
March 16, 1954	"Welcome Home"	Helen Hayes, Charlie Ruggles
March 30, 1954	"The Last Notch"	Richard Jaeckel, Jeff Morrow, Louisa Horton, John McQuade, Harry Bellaver, Royal Dano, John Kellogg
April 13, 1954	"Late Date"	Jessie Royce Landis, Walter Matthau
April 27, 1954	"The Laphams of Boston"	Dorothy Gish, Thomas Mitchell, Patricia Wheel, Paul Newman, Lois Smith, Jean Dixon, Colin Keith-Johnston, Addison Richards
May 11, 1954	"The End of Paul Dane"	Robert Preston, Teresa Wright, Warren Stevens
May 25, 1954	"The Great Chair"	Walter Hampden, Gary Merrill, Lori March
June 8, 1954	"Good for You"	Diana Lynn, Orson Bean, Kenny Delmar, Barbara Nichols, Jack Klugman
June 22, 1954	"Fearful Decision"	Ralph Bellamy, Sam Levene, Meg Mundy, Frank Overton, Joey Fallon, Frank Wilson, George Mitchell, Theodore Newton
July 6, 1954	"Haven's End"	Howard Lindsay, Betsy Palmer, Richard Hylton, Royal Beal, Jamie Smith, Russell Hardie, Chester Stratton, Dana Wynter, Lauren Gilbert
July 20, 1954	"A Garden in the Sea"	Dorothy McGuire, Mildred Natwick, Donald Murphy
August 3, 1954	"Oberstrasse 49"	Dan O'Herlihy, Margaret Phillips, Tom Helmore, Murray Matheson, Colin Keith-Johnston, Rosalind Ivan, Ben Astar
August 17, 1954	"Grand Tour"	Julie Haydon, Zachary Scott, Ruth Ford, Addison Richards, Jon Richards, John Vivyan, Louis Sorin, Fran Keegan, Helen Ray, Albert Hesse, Robert Dryden

=== 1954–1955 ===
Partial List of Episodes of The United States Steel Hour
Date	Title	Actor(s)
September 14, 1954	"The Notebook Warriors"	Sidney Blackmer, Ben Gazzara, Richard Kiley, Bob Scheerer
September 28, 1954	"Baseball Blues"	Frank Lovejoy, Billie Worth, House Jameson, Harry Bellaver, Edward Andrews, Bert Thorn, Robert Brivic, Bernice McLanglin
October 12, 1954	"The Man With the Gun"	Gary Merrill, Leueen MacGrath, Alexander Scourby, Frederic Worlock Dana Wynter, Edward Binns, Ralph Clanton
October 26, 1954	"The Fifth Wheel"	Faye Emerson, Franchot Tone, Orson Bean, Marjorie Barrett Howard St. John, Margaret Hamilton
November 9, 1954	"Goodbye ... But It Doesn't Go Away"	Jack Carson, June Lockhart, Geraldine Brooks
November 23, 1954	"King's Pawn"	John Forsythe, Janet Blair, Neil Hamilton, Anne Seymour, Michael Gorrin
January 4, 1955	"The Thief"	Diana Lynn, Paul Lukas, Mary Astor, Patric Knowles, James Dean, Nehemiah Persoff
February 15, 1955	"Freighter"	Thomas Mitchell, James Daly, Henry Hull, J. Patrick O'Malley, Jamie Smith, Martin Balsam, Mitchell Agruss, Jocelyn Brando
March 1, 1955	"Man in the Corner"	Jack Carson, Harold Vermilyea, Claire Kirby, Don Keefer, Phyllis Hill, Cliff Norton
March 15, 1955	"No Time for Sergeants"	Andy Griffith, Harry Clark, Robert Emhardt, Eddie LeRoy
April 26, 1955	"The Roads to Home"	James Daly, Beatrice Straight, Frances Heflin, Katherine Squire, Joseph Warden
June 7, 1955	"Hung for a Sheep"	Hugh Marlowe, Jerome Thor, Don Briggs, George Macready, Chester Stratton
July 6, 1955	"The Meanest Man in the World"	Wally Cox, Kenny Delmar, Josephine Hull
August 17, 1955	"The Bride Cried"	Janice Rule, Barbara O'Neil, Jamie Smith, Ruth Ford, Jane Seymour, Tammy Grimes, Lee Philips, Allen Nourse, Stephen Chase
August 31, 1955	"Counterfeit"	Edna Best, Boris Karloff

=== 1955–1956 ===
Partial List of Episodes of The United States Steel Hour
Date	Title	Actor(s)
September 28, 1955	"Ashton Buys a Horse"	Menasha Skulnik
November 9, 1955	"Outcast"	Lillian Roth, Barbara Baxley, Beverly Lunsford, Doris Dalton, Bert Thorn, Bert Freed, Joe Maross
November 23, 1955	"Incident in an Alley"	Farley Granger, Larry Gates, Lori March, Alan Hewitt, Don Hanmer
December 7, 1955	"Edward, My Son"	Robert Morley, Ann Todd, Geoffrey Toone, Sally Cooper, Frederick Tozere
January 18, 1956	"The Great Adventure"	Jessica Tandy, Hume Cronyn
February 29, 1956	"Moments of Courage"	Kim Hunter, Macdonald Carey
March 14, 1956	"The Candidate"	Ralph Bellamy
April 11, 1956	"The Funny Heart	Imogene Coca, Jack Klugman, Robert Culp
April 25, 1956	"Noon on Doomsday"	Everett Sloane, Albert Salmi, Jack Warden
May 23, 1956	"The Old Lady Shows Her Medals"	Gracie Fields, Jackie Cooper, Jerome Kilty, Moyna MacGill
June 6, 1956	"The Boarding House"	Evelyn Varden, Jerome Kilty, Walter Burke, Charles Aidman, Lisa Daniels
August 29, 1956	"The Five Fathers of Pepi"	Paul Newman, Miko Oscard

=== 1956–1957 ===
Partial List of Episodes of The United States Steel Hour
Date	Title	Actor(s)
October 10, 1956	"Sauce for the Goose"	Gypsy Rose Lee, Leora Dana, Robert Emmett
November 7, 1956	"Survival"	Arnold Moss, Franchot Tone, Albert Salmi, Olga Bellin
December 19, 1956	"The Old Lady Shows Her Medals"	Gracie Fields, Biff McGuire, William LeMassena
February 13, 1957	"Inspired Alibi"	Shelley Winters, Pat Hingle
April 24, 1957	"A Matter of Pride"	Burt Brinckerhoff, Robert Simon, Joseph Sweeney, Philip Abbott
May 8, 1957	"A Drum Is a Woman"	Duke Ellington, Carmen De Lavallade, Talley Beatty, Joya Sherrill, Margaret Tynes, Ozzie Bailey, Duke Ellington orchestra and dancers
June 5, 1957	"The Little Bullfighter"	Michael Oscard, Rip Torn, Olga Bellin, Nehemiah Persoff, Jose Perez, Jerry Morris, Gene Saks
June 19, 1957	"Upbeat"	Patti Page, John Cypher
July 17, 1957	"Victim"	Dean Stockwell, Walter Matthau

=== 1957–1958 ===
Partial List of Episodes of The United States Steel Hour
Date	Title	Actor(s)
October 9, 1957	"Who's Earnest?"	Edward Mulhare, Dorothy Collins, David Atkinson, Martyn Green, Louise Troy, Rex O'Malley
November 6, 1957	"The Locked Door"	Ralph Bellamy, June Lockhart, Brandon deWilde
December 4, 1957	"You Can't Win"	Bert Lahr, Margaret Hamilton, Doro Merande
December 18, 1957	"Little Charlie Don't Want a Saddle"	June Lockhart
January 1, 1958	"The Charmer"	Gypsy Rose Lee, Kim Smith, Rip Torn
January 15, 1958	"The Bromley Touch"	Cameron Mitchell, Leora Dana, Biff McGuire
January 29, 1958	"Never Know the End"	Andy Griffith, Nehemiah Persoff, Larry Blyden
February 12, 1958	"The Reward"	Cathleen Nesbitt, Nancy Coleman, Patty Duke, Laurence Hugo
February 26, 1958	"Walk With a Stranger"	Ed Begley, William Shatner
April 9, 1958	"Beaver Patrol"	Walter Slezak
April 23, 1958	"The Public Prosecutor"	Walter Slezak, Dolores Del Rio, John Baragrey, Frank Conroy, Jerome Kilty, Alexander Clark
May 7, 1958	"A Man in Hiding"	William Shatner, Nicholas Pryor, Joseph Sweeney
June 18, 1958	"The Littlest Enemy"	Mary Astor, Frank Conroy, Miko Oscard, Lili Darvas
July 2, 1958	"The Hidden River"	George Voskovec, Richard Kiley, Erin O'Brien-Moore, Farley Granger
July 16, 1958	"Flint and Fire"	Gloria Vanderbilt, Robert Culp, Edward Andrews
August 13, 1958	"Old Marshals Never Die"	Cameron Prud'homme, William Shatner

=== 1958–1959 ===
Partial List of Episodes of The United States Steel Hour
Date	Title	Actor(s)
October 8, 1958	"Mid-Summer"	Barbara Bel Geddes, Jackie Cooper
January 14, 1959	"Dangerous Interlude"	Viveca Lindfors, Torin Thatcher
February 11, 1959	"Family Happiness"	Gloria Vanderbilt, Jean-Pierre Aumont Patty Duke, Doreen Lang, Frieda Altman, Marcel Hillaire, Dorothy Sands, and Jane Lillig.
March 11, 1959	"The Square Egghead"	June Lockhart, Tom Ewell
April 8, 1959	"Trouble-in-Law"	Gertrude Berg, Betsy von Furstenberg, John McGiver
April 22, 1959	"Little Tin God"	Richard Boone, Fritz Weaver, Jeff Donnell, Paul McGrath, Gene Hackman, Sid Raymond
June 17, 1959	"No Leave for the Captain"	Maurice Evans, Diana van der Vlis, Geraldine Brooks
July 15, 1959	"The Pink Burro"	June Havoc, Jane Withers, Jan Norris, Edward Andrews, Elizabeth Wilson
August 26, 1959	"A Taste of Champagne"	Hans Conried, Monique van Vooren, Scott McKay, Alice Ghostley, Diana Millay, John McGovern

=== 1959–1960 ===
Partial List of Episodes of The United States Steel Hour
Date	Title	Actor(s)
September 23, 1959	"The Hours Before Dawn"	Teresa Wright, Mark Richman, Colleen Dewhurst, Jack Carter, Leona Powers, Jane Lillig
October 21, 1959	"Holiday on Wheels"	Sid Caesar, Gisele MacKenzie, Audrey Meadows, Tony Randall
November 18, 1959	"The Last Autumn"	Pat Hingle, Alexis Smith
December 16, 1959	"One Red Rose"	Helen Hayes
February 10, 1960	"The American Cowboy"	Fred MacMurray, Edie Adams, Hans Conried, Wally Cox
February 24, 1960	"Women of Hadley"	Richard Kiley, Mona Freeman, Mary Astor, Rita Gam, Cedric Hardwicke
April 6, 1960	"How to Make a Killing"	Robert Loggia, Eva Gabor, Claude Dauphin
July 20, 1960	"Shadow of a Pale Horse"	Dan Duryea, Frank Lovejoy, Ian Wolfe, William Hansen
August 10, 1960	"The Case of the Missing Wife"	Red Buttons
August 24, 1960	"Bride of the Fox"	Ina Balin, Richard Kiley

=== 1960–1961 ===
Partial List of Episodes of The United States Steel Hour
Date	Title	Actor(s)
October 19, 1960	"Step on the Gas: The Story of the American Motorist"	Jackie Cooper, Shirley Jones, Pat Carroll, Hans Conreid
November 30, 1960	"The Yum-Yum Girl"	Anne Francis, Robert Sterling, Leon Janney
February 8, 1961	"The Big Splash"	Jack Carson, Arlene Francis, Elizabeth Ashley, Michael Tolan, Keir Dullea, Walter Greaza, Robert Emhardt
March 22, 1961	"Welcome Home"	Shirley Booth, Henderson Forsythe, Flora Campbell, William Hansen, Elizabeth Wilson, Suzanne Storrs
July 12, 1961	"Watching Out for Dulie"	Larry Blyden Shari Lewis, Lloyd Bochner, Patricia Cutts, Polly Rowles, Walter Greaza, Michael Sivy, Gerry Matthews
August 9, 1961	"The Golden Thirty"	Henny Youngman, Keir Dullea, Nancy Kovack, Bibi Osterwald

=== 1961–1962 ===
Partial List of Episodes of The United States Steel Hour
Date	Title	Actor(s)
September 6, 1961	"Delayed Honeymoon"	Nancy Carroll
September 20, 1961	"Street of Love"	Millie Perkins, Doug McClure
January 10, 1962	"Far From the Shade"	Jack Carson, Anita Louise, Keir Dullea, Dan Ferrone, Pippa Scott Gene Hackman
February 7, 1962	"Nightmare at Bleak Hill"	Douglas Fairbanks Jr., Leora Dana, Donald Madden, Ken Renard
May 2, 1962	"A Man for Oona"	Tallulah Bankhead, Nancy Carroll

=== 1962–1963 ===
Partial List of Episodes of The United States Steel Hour
Date	Title	Actor(s)
October 3, 1962	"The White Lie"	David Wayne, Neva Patterson, Sallie Brophy, Leta Bonynge, Paul Mace, Adam Kennedy, Billie McNally, Mardette Perkins, Heywood Hale Broun
October 17, 1962	"Wanted: Someone Innocent"	Kim Hunter, Robert Lansing, Diana Hyland
October 31, 1962	"A Break in the Weather"	Eddie Albert, Augusta Dabney, Lawrence Weber
November 14, 1962	"Marriage Marks the Spot"	Darren McGavin, Julius La Rosa, Pippa Scott
November 28, 1962	"Farewell to Innocence"	Jeff Donnell, John Beal, Royston Thomas, Vicki Cummings, Thomas Chalmers
December 12, 1962	"Big Day for a Scrambler"	James Whitmore, Priscilla Gillette
December 26, 1962	"The Duchess and the Smugs"	Patty Duke, Fritz Weaver, Scott Forbes, Eugenie Leontovich
January 9, 1963	"The Young Avengers"	Keir Dullea, Elizabeth Ashley, Cameron Prud'homme
January 23, 1963	"Fair Young Ghost"	Shirley Knight, Robert Lansing, Cathleen Nesbitt, Dolores Dorn, Michael Clarke-Lawrence
February 6, 1963	"The Troubled Heart"	John Colicos, Toby Robins
February 20, 1963	"Night Run to the West"	Colleen Dewhurst, Ralph Meeker, Henderson Forsythe
March 6, 1963	"Moment of Rage"	Charles Aidman, Kathryn Hays, Clifton James, Glenda Farrell, Marc Connelly
March 20, 1963	"The Secrets of Stella Crozier"	Diana Millay, Frank Overton, Patricia Morison, Elinor Donahue
April 3, 1963	"Mission of Fear"	Salome Jens, Robert Horton
April 17, 1963	"The Soldier Ran Away"	Royston Thomas, Martin Sheen, John Beal
May 1, 1963	"The Many Ways to Heaven"	Cayce Peters, Dan Duryea, Cathleen Nesbitt, Nancy Wickwire, Jonathan Carter
May 15, 1963	"Don't Shake the Family Tree"	Jim Backus, Orson Bean, Fred Gwynne
May 29, 1963	"A Taste of Champagne" (rebroadcast of episode originally aired August 26, 1959)	Hans Conried, Monique van Vooren, Scott McKay, Alice Ghostley, Diana Millay, John McGovern
June 12, 1963	"The Old Lady Shows Her Medals"	Alfred Lunt, Lynn Fontanne

== Production ==
The Theatre Guild supervised production of the TV series. Executive producers included Marshall Jamison. Producers included George Kondolf. Episodes on ABC were produced at ABC Television Center on West 66th Street in New York. Broadcasts originated from WABC-TV.

During its time on ABC, Alex Segal was the director. Directors on CBS included Boris Sagal, Marshall Jamison, Paul Bogart, Don Richardson, Tom Donovan, Norman Felton, Dan Petrie, and Sidney Lumet. Concurrent with the change of networks, the Guild applied "the well-known theory that a certain director may be skilléd in staging a comedy, but somewhat inept at serious drama".

The March 15, 1955, episode ("No Time for Sergeants") was the show's first presentation before a live studio audience. A network representative said that the change should "engender honest laughter".

== Adaptations and other uses of episodes ==
- "Bang the Drum Slowly (1956) – Bang the Drum Slowly (film, 1973)

"P. O. W.", the series's premiere episode, was used to help American armed forces personnel who had problems as they returned from fighting in Korea. At the request of the United States Department of Defense, ABC provided a film of the live broadcast to be used as a training film.

The series's musical adaptation of Tom Sawyer was itself adapted into a stage musical. The production debuted on July 13, 1958, at the Starlight Theatre in Swope Park in Kansas City, Missouri.

A "full-blown West End presentation of Who's Earnest" was produced in London in 1957. The musical was an adaptation of the October 9, 1957, Steel Hour episode.

The script for "Welcome Home" (March 16, 1954) was developed into a full-length play for stage performances.

== Controversy ==
Rod Serling was not regarded as a controversial scriptwriter until he contributed to The United States Steel Hour, as he recalled in his collection Patterns (1957):

In the television seasons of 1952 and 1953, almost every television play I sold to the major networks was "non-controversial". This is to say that in terms of their themes they were socially inoffensive, and dealt with no current human problem in which battle lines might be drawn. After the production of Patterns, when my things were considerably easier to sell, in a mad and impetuous moment I had the temerity to tackle a theme that was definitely two-sided in its implications. I think this story is worth repeating.

The script was called Noon on Doomsday. It was produced by the Theatre Guild on The United States Steel Hour in April 1956. The play, in its original form, followed very closely the Till case in Mississippi, where a young Negro boy was kidnapped and killed by two white men who went to trial and were exonerated on both counts. The righteous and continuing wrath of the Northern press opened no eyes and touched no consciences in the little town in Mississippi where the two men were tried. It was like a cold wind that made them huddle together for protection against an outside force which they could equate with an adversary. It struck me at the time that the entire trial and its aftermath was simply "They're bastards, but they're our bastards." So I wrote a play in which my antagonist was not just a killer but a regional idea. It was the story of a little town banding together to protect its own against outside condemnation. At no point in the conception of my story was there a black-white issue. The victim was an old Jew who ran a pawnshop. The killer was a neurotic malcontent who lashed out at something or someone who might be materially and physically the scapegoat for his own unhappy, purposeless, miserable existence. Philosophically I felt that I was on sound ground. I felt that I was dealing with a sociological phenomenon—the need of human beings to have a scapegoat to rationalize their own shortcomings.

Noon on Doomsday finally went on the air several months later, but in a welter of publicity that came from some 15,000 letters and wires from White Citizens' Councils and the like protesting the production of the play. In news stories, the play had been erroneously described as "The story of the Till case". At one point earlier, during an interview on the Coast, I told a reporter from one of the news services the story of Noon on Doomsday. He said, "Sounds like the Till case." I shrugged it off, answering, "If the shoe fits..." This is all it took. From that moment on Noon on Doomsday was the dramatization of the Till case. And no matter how the Theatre Guild or the agency representing U.S. Steel denied it, the impression persisted. The offices of the Theatre Guild, on West 53rd Street in New York City, took on all the aspects of a football field ten seconds after the final whistle blew.

=== Critical response ===
A review of the broadcast in The New York Times said, "Mr. Serling grappled with a potentially compelling theme —how the narrow-mindedness of a small town led members of the community to forgo principle." To do so, the review said, "Serling indulged in a succession of rather implausible events and then coated them with so much emotion that his work seemed artificially supercharged instead of genuinely powerful." It added that the episode's characters emerged as stereotypes more than "as people of persuasive dimension".

== Awards ==
Theater Guild on the Air won a Peabody Award for drama in 1947. The United States Steel Hour won Emmys in 1954 for Best Dramatic Program and Best New Program. The following year it won an Emmy for Best Dramatic Series, and Alex Segal was nominated for Best Direction. It received eight Emmy nominations in 1956, then one nomination for the years 1957, 1959, and 1961. In 1962, the episode "The Two Worlds of Charlie Gordon" was nominated for the Hugo Award for Best Dramatic Presentation. The program won TV Guide's Gold Medal Award for 1953-54 as one of three programs "honored for their outstanding achievement, initiative and enterprise and their major contributions to the industry". Gracie Fields won a 1956 Sylvania Award for her performance in "The Old Lady Shows Her Medals".
