= Joseph Holland (actor) =

American stage actor (1910–1994)

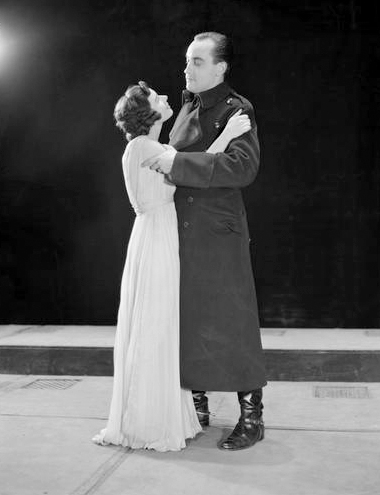
Holland (with Evelyn Allen) in a 1937 production of Julius Caesar

Joseph Holland (August 30, 1910 – December 28, 1994) was an American actor of stage and screen who was principally known for his work in the theatre. Active on Broadway from 1935 through 1957, he was particularly admired for his performances in the plays of William Shakespeare. He was notably a founding member of John Houseman and Orson Welles' Mercury Theatre in 1937; performing the title role in Shakespeare's Julius Caesar for the first play mounted by that company. During that production he was seriously wounded by Welles, in the role of Brutus, who stabbed him in the chest and arm with a steel knife in the famous Act 3 Scene 1 betrayal. After a month of recovery, he returned to the production. Holland went on to create roles in original works by playwrights Maxwell Anderson, Lindsay and Crouse, Elsie Schauffler, and Robert E. Sherwood. He worked periodically on television as a guest actor from 1949 through 1961 on a variety of programs, and appeared in a minor supporting role in the 1958 film Rally Round the Flag, Boys!.

== Early life and education ==
Born in Franklin, Virginia, Holland grew up in a small farming community and first acted in plays in high school. He earned degrees in drama from the University of Richmond (BA, 1932) and the Royal Academy of Dramatic Arts (RADA) in London (MA, 1934). At the University of Richmond he performed the title role in Othello in his senior year, and was also the first person to give a dramatic speech at the newly built amphitheater, the Jenkins Greek Theatre. In 1934 he portrayed the title role in Shakespeare's King Lear at the Theatre Royal Haymarket in a student production staged by RADA with fellow castmates including British character actor Francis de Wolff as Cornwall.

== Stage career ==
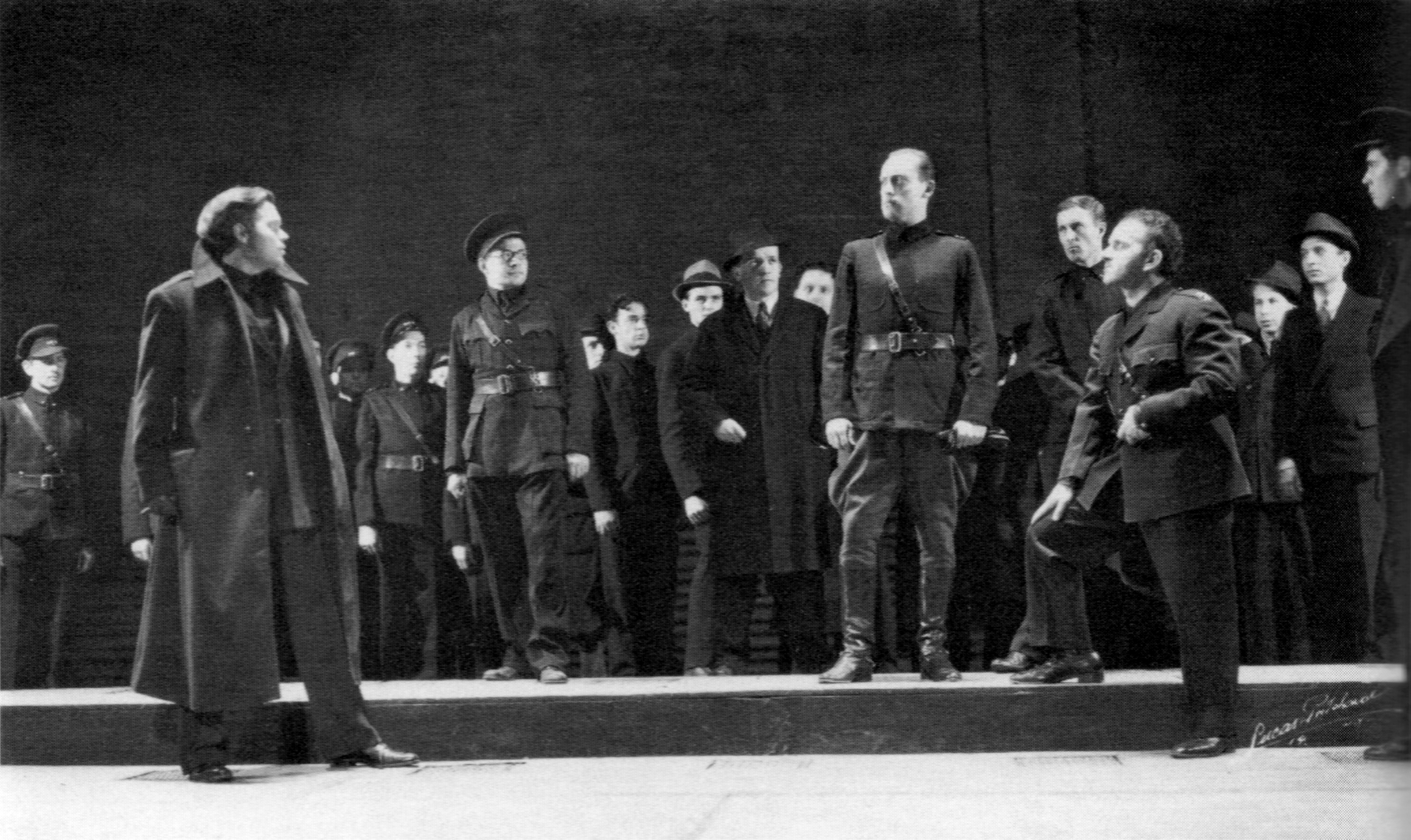
The Mercury Theatre production of Julius Caesar, the scene in which Julius Caesar (Holland, center) addresses the conspirators including Brutus (Orson Welles, left).

Holland made his professional stage debut in London while a student at RADA as George Patterson in Howard Irving Young's The Drums Begin at the Embassy Theatre in April 1934. He moved to New York City after graduating from RADA, and landed the small role of Sampson, a servant to Capulet, in Katharine Cornell's 1934 Broadway revival of Shakespeare's Romeo and Juliet. It was the first of 22 plays that Holland would appear in on Broadway through 1957. He appeared in several more Cornell productions on Broadway including the roles of Robert de Baudricourt and Canon John D'Estivet in George Bernard Shaw's Saint Joan (1936) and Pompey in Shakespeare's Antony and Cleopatra (1947–1948). In 1935 he portrayed the Gentleman of Cyprus in Othello with Kenneth MacKenna as Iago, Gladys Cooper as Desdemona, and Philip Merivale in the title role.

In 1937 Holland became a founding member of Broadway's Mercury Theater with Orson Welles and John Houseman. He portrayed the title role in Shakespeare's Julius Caesar in the company's very first production with Welles as Brutus. This production was critically acclaimed and staged with the intent of evoking comparisons to then contemporary Nazi Germany and Fascist Italy. Holland was selected for the role partly because he resembled Mussolini.

During the Broadway run of Julius Caesar an accident occurred on April 6, 1938, when Orson Welles stabbed Joseph Holland with a steel knife and seriously wounded him in Act 3 Scene 1 where Brutus betrays Caesar. Welles had insisted on using a real knife instead of a prop knife for the production, and in this particular performance, instead of creating the illusion of a stabbing as rehearsed, he stabbed Holland in the chest and arm. Holland managed to get out his last lines, "Et tu, Brute? Then fall, Caesar.", and fell and collapsed to the floor in front of an audience of hundreds. The other actors continued with the scene, slipping on Holland's blood as he lay bleeding out onto the stage, until the curtain closed another 10 to 15 minutes later. Holland was rushed to the hospital, seriously wounded, and took a month to recover from his injury. After his recovery he returned to the role of Caesar in the production, and recorded the role on the radio program The Mercury Theatre on the Air in 1938. Years later, when asked how he would respond if he saw Orson Welles on the street, he stated, "I’d turn and go the other way."

Holland also appeared in multiple Shakespeare revivals on Broadway mounted by Basil Rathbone, including Hamlet (1936, as Horatio) and Julius Caesar (1950, as Brutus). In 1937 he performed the role of The Archduke John of Tuscany in the world premiere of Maxwell Anderson's The Masque of Kings with the Theatre Guild. Other original Broadway plays he created roles in included Timothy Healy in Elsie Schauffler's Parnell (1935–1936), Worth in George S. George's Clean Beds (1939), Emory Wages in Anderson's The Bad Seed (1950), Bacilek in Lindsay and Crouse's The Great Sebastians (1956), and Robert Murray in Robert E. Sherwood's Small War on Murray Hill (1957). He also created the role of Theodore in Jimmy Van Heusen's Swingin' The Dream; a musical adaptation of A Midsummer Night's Dream in 1939. He portrayed Frank Hyland in the 1950 Broadway revival of George Kelly's The Show-Off. In 1954 he appeared Off-Broadway at the Phoenix Theatre as Cominius in Shakespeare's Coriolanus with John Houseman directing and Robert Ryan in the title role.

Outside of New York, Holland created the role of Comte de Guiche in Vernon Duke’s 1939 musical The White Plume at the National Theatre in Washington D.C. In 1940 he starred in a production of The Winter's Tale for the Detroit Theatre Festival at the Mendelssohn Theatre on the campus of the University of Michigan. He portrayed Brabantio in Othello at the Boston Summer Theatre in 1948 with Canada Lee in the title role. He traveled the United States in 1948–1949 in the title roles in Hamlet and Macbeth in a 30-week-long national tour.

== Television and film ==
Holland made his first foray into television in the anthology series Suspense; appearing in three episodes of that program from 1949 through 1951. In 1950 he appeared in the television drama "The Traitor" on the anthology series The Ford Theatre Hour. Other guest roles followed on the television programs Schlitz Playhouse of Stars (1951), Robert Montgomery Presents (1951), Tales of Tomorrow (1952), Dark of Night (1952), Suspicion (1958), Flight (1958), Goodyear Theatre (1958), Peter Gunn (1959), Bronco (1959), Alfred Hitchcock Presents (1960), The Millionaire (1960), and 77 Sunset Strip (1961). Holland's only film appearance was as the town official Manning Thaw in Rally Round the Flag, Boys! (1958).

== Personal life and death ==
Holland was gay, and began a relationship with his life partner Vincent Newton in 1935. Their relationship lasted until his death 59 years later. During World War II Holland served in the United States Army for four years as a lieutenant.

Holland and his partner moved from New York City to Nichols Canyon, Los Angeles, in the Hollywood Hills portion of the city in the mid 1950s. After leaving acting behind in the early 1960s, Holland and Newton purchased an apartment complex and several homes close to the University of California, Los Angeles; making a living as landlords. The couple eventually relocated to Santa Fe, New Mexico, where they lived in the latter part of Holland's life.

Holland died in Santa Fe on December 28, 1994.

== Selected filmography ==
- Alfred Hitchcock Presents (1960) (Season 5 Episode 23: "Craig's Will") as Estate Attorney
