= Roar, China! =

1920s-30s artistic theme and works

Roar, China! was an artistic theme and the title of various artistic works authored from the 1920s through the 1930s which expressed solidarity with China. Significant works include the poem and play by Soviet Futurist Sergei Tretyakov, Langston Hughes' poem of the same name, and a wood cut by Li Hua.

== Roar, China! works ==
=== Sergei Tretyakov poem and play ===
In 1924, Soviet futurist poet and playwright Sergei Tretyakov wrote a poem titled, Roar, China! Shortly afterwards, he turned the poem into a play depicting fictional events similar to those which happened later in the 1926 Wanxian Incident, when the British military massacred hundreds of Chinese civilians. In Tokyo, the Tsukiji Theatre performed Tretyakov's Roar, China! from 31 August to 4 September 1929, when authorities shut down the performances.

Theatre Guild's 1930 production of Roar, China! was Broadway's first play with a majority Asian cast. Chinese performers were recruited by the Chinese Benevolent and Dramatic Association. The cast included economist Ji Chaoding.

A British production of the play was banned from being performed at the Cambridge Festival Theatre, but the play was later staged by The Unnamed Society in Manchester in November 1931.

The play was also performed in Berlin, Vienna, and Frankfurt.

Nikolai Bukharin described the global spread of the play as part of a historical process in which the throngs of workers would become revolutionaries.

Tretyakov's Roar, China! poem and play also became popular in China, where they were translated multiple times. In 1933, on the second anniversary of the Mukden incident, a production of Roar, China! was staged at the Hung King Theatre in Shanghai's French Concession. Increasing pressure from the Japanese led authorities to censor the play, both in the foreign concessions and elsewhere in China. A production which included Jiang Qing was among those banned by British authorities.

=== Li Hua woodcut ===
In 1935, Li Hua produced the woodcut Roar, China! (怒吼吧中国). The woodcut depicts the front view of a "taut, muscular, and naked male body, bound and blindfolded". The incisions create dark and angular lines, which academic Xiaobing Tang describes as giving "the constrained body a translucent quality, suggesting a radiating force that charges and electrifies the physical body".

=== Langston Hughes poem ===
On 29 August 1937, Langston Hughes wrote a poem titled Roar, China! which called for China's resistance to the full-scale invasion which Japan had launched less than two months earlier. Hughes biographer and translator of his works into Chinese, Luo Xingqun, writes that Hughes was inspired to write the poem by his experiences in Shanghai and his encounters with Soong Ching-ling and Lu Xun. Hughes used China as a metonym for the "global colour line." According to academic Gao Yunxiang, Hughes' poem was integral to the global circulation of Roar, China! as an artistic theme.

Hughes later wrote, but did not publish, a poem called China. Academic Selina Lai-Henderson writes that the brief poem, which begins in medias res, may have been intended as a sequel to Hughes' Roar, China!
