= Catherine Lawrence =

American theatre actress

Catherine Lawrence Roberts (born Doris Lawrence; October 28, 1909 – March 28, 1964) was an American theatre actress. She appeared in several Broadway productions between 1931 and 1941. She studied theatre at The Neighborhood Playhouse School of the Theatre and was affiliated with the Theatre Guild and several members of Group Theatre.
