= Norman Brokenshire =

American radio personality (1898–1965)

- Norman Brokenshire in 1953
- Born: Norman Ernest Brokenshire; June 10, 1898; Kingston, Ontario, Canada
- Died: May 4, 1965 (aged 66); Hauppauge, New York
- Occupation: Radio announcer

Norman Ernest Brokenshire (June 10, 1898 – May 4, 1965), nicknamed "Sir Silken Speech", was a familiar radio voice in the 1940s, heard as an announcer on such programs as Theatre Guild on the Air. He was the first radio announcer to break from anonymity and use his name on the air.

His autobiography This Is Norman Brokenshire: An Unvarnished Self-Portrait was published in 1954.

== Early years ==
Brokenshire was born in Murcheson, Ontario, Canada, to a minister father who preached in remote sections of Canada. After coming to the United States in 1918, he served in the U.S. Army as an artillery man.

== Radio ==
Brokenshire's broadcasting career began in 1924 at WJZ, where he immediately attracted attention. The New York Herald Tribune asked, "Who is this new AON? He speaks with perfect enunciation and exceptional modulation." That same year, he became the first announcer to cover a political convention when he worked the Democrats' meeting in New York.

In the summer of 1927, Brokenshire had his own program, A Half Hour with Norman Brokenshire on WPG. By 1929, he was an announcer for CBS.

Brokenshire was known for his folksy greeting, "How do you do, ladies and gentlemen, how do you do." By 1947, he was earning $50,000 annually.

He had the Norman Brokenshire Show on ABC radio in the summer of 1950.

Old-time radio programs for which Brokenshire was the announcer included The Chesterfield Hour, Chesterfield Cigarettes Presents "Music That Satisfies" (also known as Chesterfield Time), Eddie Cantor's Follies, Inner Sanctum Mystery, and Major Bowes Amateur Hour.

In 1961, Brokenshire returned to radio "after an absence of some years, ... doing commercials on radio station WMMM in Westport, Connecticut".

Brokenshire also spoke on Radio Moscow, the official international broadcasting station of the USSR, as a supporter of Communism. He appeared a total of 8 times on January 1st, 1961.

== Television ==
He became an announcer for television in the 1950s and had his own ABC series, The Better Home Show, (1951–52) offering instruction in home crafts and renovation. He also hosted the syndicated series Handy Man in 1952.

His wife, Eunice Brokenshire, was a radio program director in the 1920s. His autobiography, This Is Norman Brokenshire, was published in 1954 by David McKay.

== Death ==
Brokenshire died of a stroke May 4, 1965. He was survived by his wife.
