= Li Hua =

Chinese artist

- Born: March 6, 1907
- Died: May 5, 1994; Beijing
- Education: Municipal Guangzhou Art School (1926); Kawabata Art School, Tokyo (1930)
- Known for: Printmaking
- Notable work: Roar China! (怒吼吧中国)

Li Hua (simplified Chinese: 李桦; traditional Chinese: 李樺; pinyin: Lǐ Huà; March 6, 1907 − May 5, 1994) was a Chinese woodcut artist and communist known for his participation in left-wing activities. He was born in Panyu, Guangdong.

== Career ==
He graduated from the Municipal Guangzhou Art School in 1926 and remained there as a teacher. In 1930, Li went to Japan to study fine arts at Kawabata ga gakkō (川端画学校, "Kawabata Art School") in Tokyo.

Li returned to Guangzhou in 1932, after the Mukden Incident broke out, and served once again as a teacher at the art school where he had studied. At that time, he began to learn woodcutting art. He was influenced by Lu Xun who regarded him as one of the most promising woodcut artists of his generation. In June 1934, Li founded the Modern Woodcut Society at the Guangzhou Art School with an initial membership of 27.

Among Li's artistic influences were Käthe Kollwitz.

He produced many woodcuts to protest against the invasion by the Japanese army and the decaying government that was led by Chiang Kai-shek. In 1935, Li produced the woodcut Roar, China! The woodcut depicts the front view of a "taut, muscular, and naked male body, bound and blindfolded". Another one of Li's notable woodcut series was Raging Tide from 1947.

In 1949, he became a professor of the Central Academy of Fine Arts, and continued his artistic creations.

Despite Li not officially joining the Chinese Communist Party until 1953, his work had been associated with the leftist cause for many years. Li died in Beijing at the Peking Union Medical Hospital in 1994.

== Selected publications ==
- Li Hua (1995). Chen Yousheng (ed.). Chinese Woodcuts. Translated by Zuo Boyang. Foreign Languages Press. ISBN 978-7-119-00388-7.
