= Margaret Tynes =

American opera singer (1919–2024)

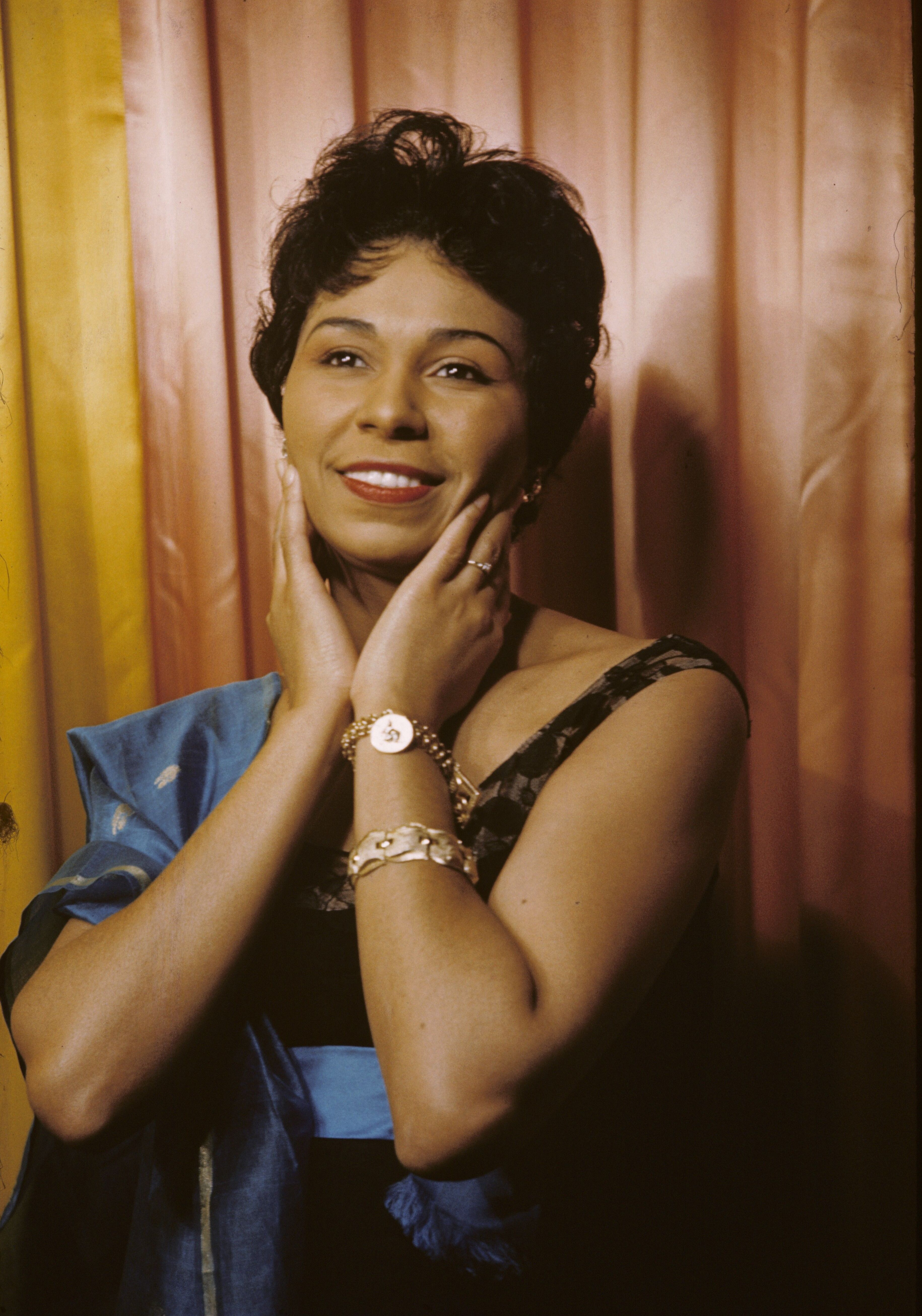
- Tynes in 1959
- Born: September 11, 1919; Saluda, Virginia, U.S.
- Died: March 7, 2024 (aged 104); Silver Spring, Maryland, U.S.
- Occupation: Operatic soprano
- Spouse: Hans von Klier

Margaret Elinor Tynes (September 11, 1919 – March 7, 2024) was an American operatic soprano.

== Early life and education ==
Born in Saluda, Virginia, on September 11, 1919, Margaret Elinor Tynes was one of ten children born to Lucy Jane (née Rich) and Rev. J. W. Tynes. Her family was involved with the leadership at Northern Neck Industrial Academy; and they later moved to Lynchburg and finally to Greensboro, North Carolina, where her father was the pastor of the Providence Baptist Church for 26 years.

Tynes went to James B. Dudley High School, where she sang in the school chorus and was mentored by Eloise Logan Penn.

She attended the Negro Agricultural and Technical College of North Carolina (A&T) in Greensboro, where she was named "Miss A&T" of 1939–1940 and graduated in 1941. Her two sisters also attended A&T, Katherine in 1935 and Angeline c. 1940 and all three were Miss A&Ts. She then studied voice at the Juilliard School in New York City and received a master's degree in music education from Columbia University in 1944.

== Career ==
Her first opera role was Lady Macbeth in 1952. During this period, she performed in a Harry Belafonte Broadway show called Sing Man, Sing!. She was a featured singer with the New York City Opera for five seasons and played Bess in Porgy and Bess there for six years. Tynes sang the role of Lady Macbeth for the Montreal Opera Guild in 1959, and came back the next year as Carmen. Her performance in the title role of Richard Strauss's opera Salome directed by Luchino Visconti at the 1961 Spoleto Festival was compared to Felicia Weathers and Ljuba Welitsch; Time praised her rich, ringing voice and stage presence.

Tynes was one of a group of artists to appear at the American National Exhibition in Moscow in 1959, assembled by Ed Sullivan and sponsored by the US State Department. and was the first American singer to perform at the Budapest Opera after World War II

The Philadelphia Museum of Art has a photograph of her taken by Carl Van Vechten in their collection. In 2001, she donated a collection of her papers and photographs to the A&T Bluford Library.

== Personal life ==
Margaret Tynes married Hans von Klier (1934–2000), an industrial designer of Czech-German aristocratic descent. They made their home in Milan and on Lake Garda. Tynes returned to live in the United States when she was widowed.

Tynes died in Silver Spring, Maryland, on March 4, 2024, at the age of 104.
