= Theatre Guild =

New York City theatrical society

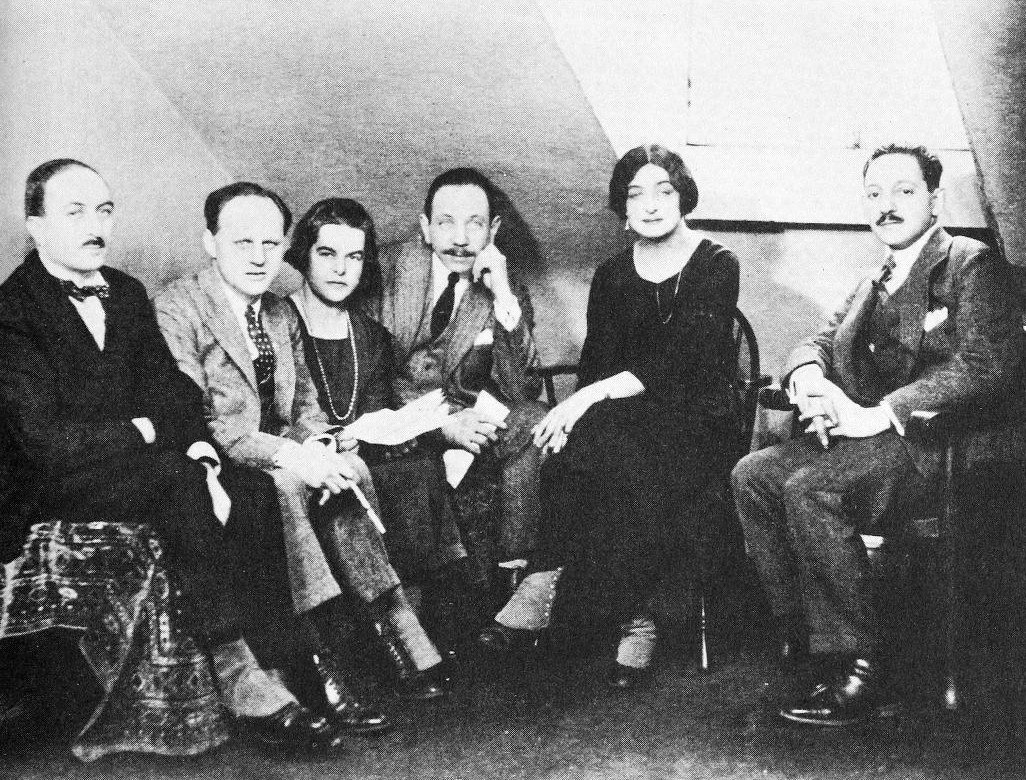
- Directors of the Theatre Guild in 1923. Left to right: Lawrence Langner, Philip Moeller, Theresa Helburn, Maurice Wertheim, Helen Westley and Lee Simonson.
- Formation: 1918
- Founders: Lawrence Langner, Rollo Peters, Philip Moeller, Helen Westley, and Theresa Helburn
- Dissolved: 1996
- Type: Theatre producing company
- Location: New York City

The Theatre Guild is a theatrical society founded in New York City in 1918 by Lawrence Langner, Rollo Peters, Philip Moeller, Helen Westley and Theresa Helburn. Langner's wife, Armina Marshall, then served as a co-director. It evolved out of the work of the Washington Square Players.

== History ==
Its original purpose was to produce non-commercial works by American and foreign playwrights. It differed from other theaters at the time in that its board of directors shared the responsibility of choosing plays, management, and production. Rollo Peters served as the organization's first general director until his resignation in November 1919. The Theatre Guild contributed greatly to the success of Broadway from the 1920s throughout the 1970s.

The Guild has produced a total of 228 plays on Broadway, including 18 by George Bernard Shaw and seven by Eugene O'Neill. Other major playwrights introduced to theatre-going Americans include Robert E. Sherwood, Maxwell Anderson, Sidney Howard, William Saroyan, and Philip Barry. In the field of musical theatre, the Guild has promoted works by Richard Rodgers, teamed with both Lorenz Hart and Oscar Hammerstein II, George and Ira Gershwin, Jule Styne, and Meredith Willson, all of which have become classics. The Guild's 1930 production of Roar, China! was Broadway's first play with a majority Asian cast.

In 1925, the Guild opened the Guild Theater at 245 West 52nd Street in New York City's Theater District. The venue hosted Theater Guild plays until 1943, at which point the Guild leased the space to radio station WOR. The Guild sold the building in 1950, and it has subsequently been sold and renamed several times. As of 2026, the building remained in use as a Broadway theatre, named the August Wilson Theatre.

Warren Caro served as the organization's executive director from 1946 through 1967. Under President John F. Kennedy, the Guild was engaged to assemble a U.S. theatre company, headed by Helen Hayes, to tour the capitals of Europe and South America with works by Tennessee Williams, Thornton Wilder, and William Gibson.

In 1968, the Guild became involved in the travel field by taking 25 of its subscribers to European capitals to see plays. In 1975, it instituted its Theatre At Sea program with a 17-day cruise aboard the Rotterdam with Hayes and Cyril Ritchard. Since then they have hosted more than thirty cruises, each with seven or eight performers. Among them have been Alan Arkin, Zoe Caldwell, Anne Jackson, Cherry Jones, Richard Kiley, Eartha Kitt, Patricia Neal, Lynn Redgrave, Gena Rowlands, Jean Stapleton, Eli Wallach, and Lee Roy Reams, who served as the program's resident director.

The last Broadway play produced by The Theatre Guild was State Fair in 1996.

== Radio and television ==
Theatre Guild began producing radio programs: Theatre Guild Drama (CBS , 1943) and the Theatre Guild on the Air (ABC , 1945). In 1947, Theatre Guild began producing television programs with NBC, later as The United States Steel Hour.

== Notable productions ==
- 1920: Heartbreak House
- 1921: Liliom
- 1922: R.U.R. (Rossum's Universal Robots)
- 1922: He Who Gets Slapped
- 1923: Saint Joan
- 1925: Processional
- 1927: Porgy
- 1928: Strange Interlude
- 1930: Roar, China!
- 1931: Mourning Becomes Electra
- 1933: Ah, Wilderness!
- 1935: Porgy and Bess
- 1936: The Masque of Kings; Idiot's Delight
- 1939: The Philadelphia Story; The Time of Your Life
- 1943: Oklahoma!
- 1943: Othello
- 1944: Jacobowsky and the Colonel
- 1945: Carousel
- 1946: The Iceman Cometh
- 1947 Allegro
- 1947: The Winslow Boy
- 1950: Come Back, Little Sheba
- 1953: Picnic; The Trip to Bountiful
- 1955: The Matchmaker
- 1956: Bells Are Ringing
- 1958: Sunrise at Campobello
- 1960: The Unsinkable Molly Brown
- 1965: The Royal Hunt of the Sun
- 1974: Absurd Person Singular
