= Armina Marshall =

American playwright and actress, early producer at the Theatre Guild

- Marshall in 1955
- Born: 1895; Oklahoma territory, U.S.
- Died: July 20, 1991 (aged 95–96); New York City, U.S.
- Other names: Armina Marshall Langer, Isabelle Louden
- Occupations: playwright, actress
- Spouse: Lawrence Langner (m. 1925; died 1962)

Armina Marshall (1895-1991) was a playwright and actress, and the first co-director of New York's Theatre Guild.

== Early life and education ==
Marshall was born in 1895 in the Oklahoma territory in the narrow border between Oklahoma and Kansas known as Cherokee Outlet. She was part American Indian, and her father was a sheriff. When the family lived in Pawnee, the residence was under the jail. From age 7 on she slept with a gun under her pillow. She said, "I could shoot straight." Traveling plays that came through the territory created Marshall's desire to be an actress. She was raised as "a strict Presbyterian", and parents opposed her choice of career. Marshall said, "My mother wouldn't speak to me. She thought New York was a hellhole and I'd lose my virginity and everything."

The family moved to California and she attended the University of California Los Angeles. She was a school teacher in Brawley, California, and acted in theatrical productions there.

Marshall studied at the American Academy of Dramatic Arts in New York.

== Career ==
Marshall's early acting experience included performing in the Greek Theater in San Francisco. She went to New York and gained a walk-on role in a play at $15 per week.

Marshall's New York acting debut was in 1922 in Paul Claudel's The Tidings Brought to Mary. She shifted to producing once she was married, and was the co-author of seven plays, three on Broadway, including the 1933 hit Pursuit of Happiness produced by The Federal Theatre Division of the Works Progress Administration (written under the pseudonym Isabelle Louden).

Marshall was instrumental in bringing the Theatre Guild to new audiences, directing Theater Guild on the Air for eight years on the radio, as well as The U.S. Steel Hour for eight years on television. Marshall and her co-producers won a Tony Award for Best Play in 1958 for the production of Sunrise At Campobello. She later went on to be a producer at the Theater Guild. The Theater Guild's production of Oklahoma in 1943 was said to have "transformed the face of American musical theater."

Along with her husband, Marshall founded and operated the Westport Country Playhouse in 1930 which did "New York plays" for a Connecticut audience. Marshall and Langer converted an old cow barn into a venue with a Broadway-sized stage. They operated the theater continuously, except for a small break during WWII, until 1959. In 1955 they founded the American Shakespeare Theatre in Stratford, Connecticut.

At age 83, Marshall continued to work at the Guild office, "reading scripts, signing checks, supervising their travel agency which arranges theater and opera tickets for Theatre Guild subscribers travelling abroad and keeping an astute eye on current productions".

During World War II Marshall was one of the founders of the Stage Door Canteen in Washington, D. C. She was a director of the American Academy of Dramatic Arts, the American Theater Wing, and the Actors Fund.

== Personal life and death ==
She married Lawrence Langner in 1925. He died in 1962. The couple had one son and two granddaughters. Marshall died on July 20, 1991, in her home in Manhattan, aged 96.
