= Theresa Helburn =

American playwright and theatrical producer (1887–1959)

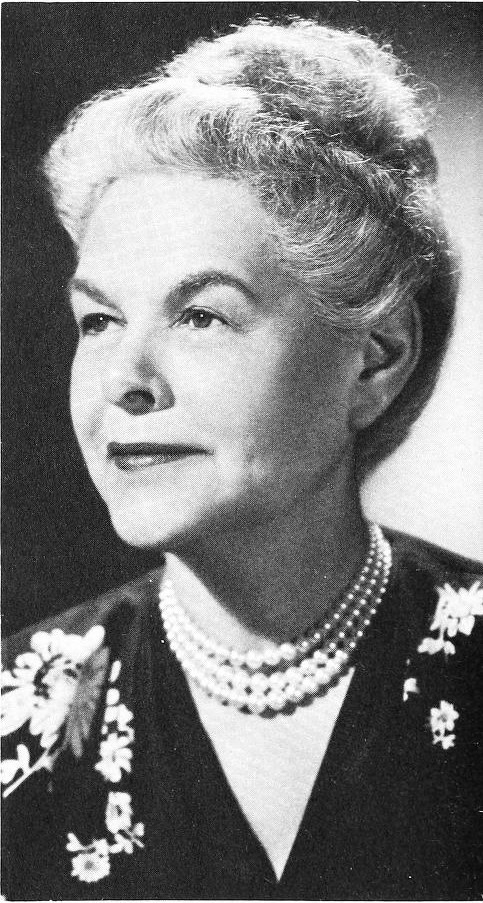
Theresa Helburn

Theresa Helburn (January 12, 1887 – August 18, 1959) was an American playwright and theatrical producer best known for her work as a co-founder and producer of New York's Theatre Guild from 1919 to the 1950s.

== Early life ==
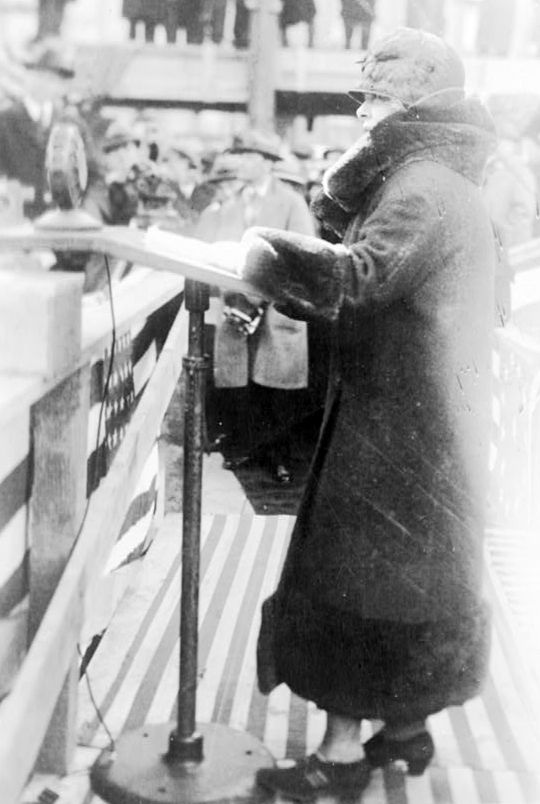
Helburn at the laying of the cornerstone of the Guild Theatre in 1924

Helburn was born in New York City to Julius Helburn, a leather merchant, and Hannah née Peyser, who established her own experimental elementary school. She attended the Horace Mann School and Winsor School in Boston before graduating from Bryn Mawr College in 1908. There she was active in theatre. She then studied playwriting at Radcliffe College and at the Sorbonne.

== Career ==
She then taught theatre and wrote drama criticism.

On 16 January 1918, her play, Enter the Hero was first produced by the St. Francis Little Theatre Players, in San Francisco.

By September 1918, the first of her own plays was produced on Broadway, Crops and Croppers at the Belmont Theatre, later published as Allison Makes Hay, in 1919.

== Theatre Guild and later years ==
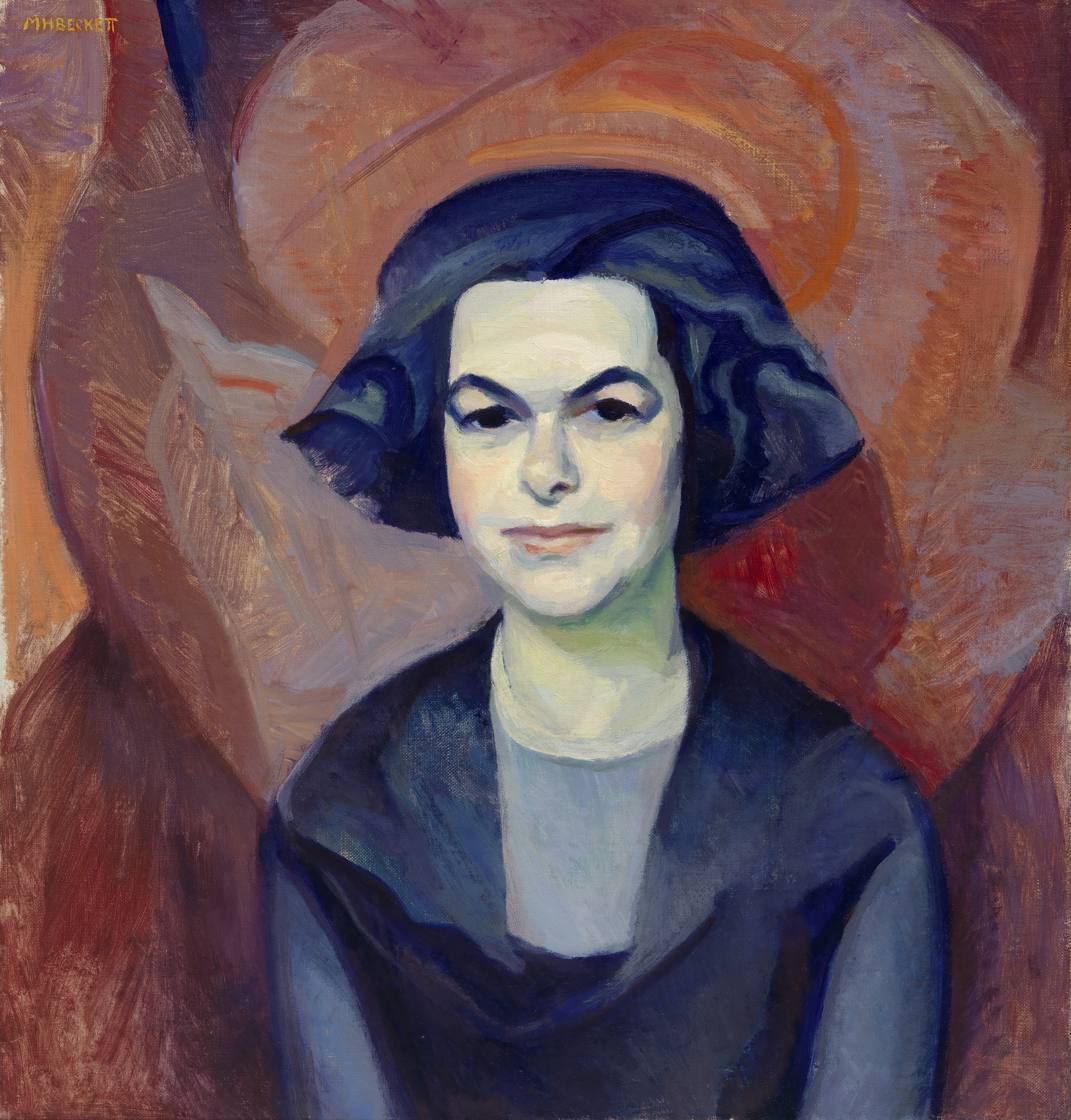
Portrait of Helburn by Marion H. Beckett (1922)

Helburn was a co-founder of the Theatre Guild in 1919. There she acted first as a literary manager, reviewing scripts, then as casting director, and later became co-producer with Lawrence Langner. The Guild brought original dramas from European and American playwrights, such as George Bernard Shaw and Eugene O'Neill, to the Broadway stage, and established relationships with such notable actors as Alfred Lunt and Lynn Fontanne, whom Helburn cast together for the first time in 1924. In 1925, just six years after the establishment of the production company, Helburn presided over the groundbreaking ceremony for the new Guild Theatre (now August Wilson Theatre). She also supported new plays and playwrights in smaller theatres. Some of Helburn's Broadway productions in the 1930s included Mourning Becomes Electra (1931) and The Philadelphia Story (1939). In the early 1930s, she also worked briefly in Hollywood, and she maintained strong ties with the film and television industries until the time of her death. Later, for the Guild, she came up with the concept to turn the Guild's earlier production of Green Grow the Lilacs into a musical, which became Oklahoma! Likewise, the Guild had produced Liliom, which was later adapted as Carousel. Other important Broadway productions included The Iceman Cometh (1946), Come Back, Little Sheba (1950), Picnic (1953) and The Trip to Bountiful (1953).

== Personal life ==
In 1922, she married John Baker Opdycke (1878-1956), a "teacher and author of books on commercial English". Opdycke also wrote poetry under the pen name of "Oliver Opdyke". They had no children.

In August 1959, Helburn died at age 72 at Norwalk, Connecticut. A collection of theatrical ephemera, photographs and writings relating to Helburn's life and to the Guild is housed at Bryn Mawr College. She wrote an unfinished memoir, published posthumously in 1960, A wayward quest. The autobiography of Theresa Helburn, by Little, Brown.

== Sources ==
- Nolan, Frederick. The Sound of Their Music: The Story of Rodgers and Hammerstein. New York: Applause Books, 2002, ISBN 1-55783-473-3
