= Lawrence Langner =

American dramatist (1890–1962)

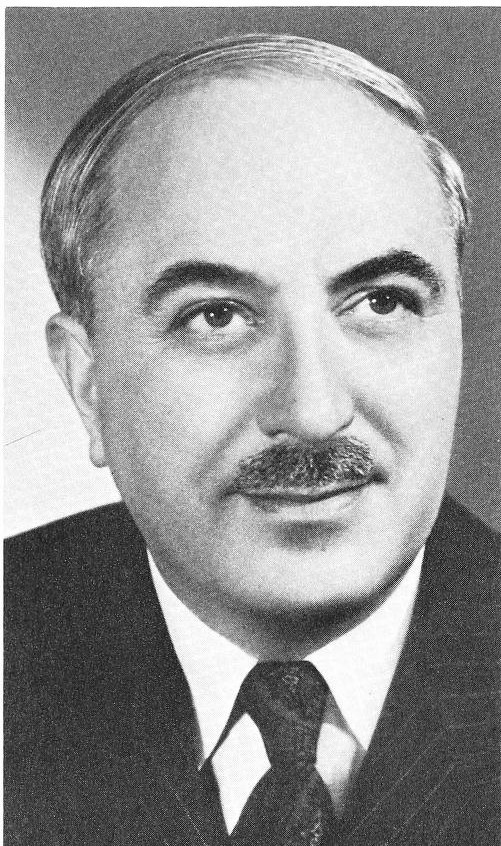
Lawrence Langner

Lawrence Langner (May 30, 1890 – 1962) was a playwright, author, and producer who had "a rich practice as one of the nation’s top patent attorneys".

== Early years ==
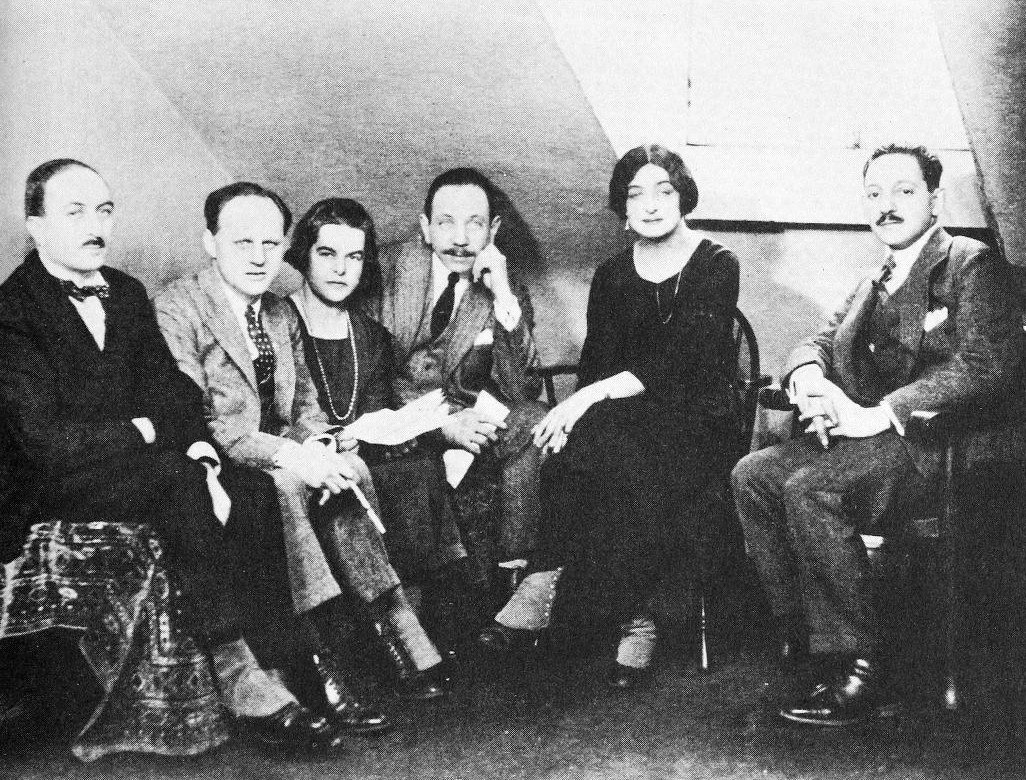
The board of directors of the Theatre Guild (from left): Lawrence Langner, Philip Moeller, Theresa Helburn, Maurice Wertheim, Helen Westley, Lee Simonson (1923)

Langner was born on May 30, in 1890, in Swansea, South Wales, and moved with his parents to London in 1903. By the time he was 13 years old, his father had died and his mother had remarried. The family's financial situation was such that Langner had to go to work; replying to a help-wanted ad led to his working for a theatrical manager as a junior clerk.

== Theatrical career ==
Langner worked most of his life in the United States.

He was one of the founders of the Washington Square Players troupe in 1914, and the Provincetown Players produced plays that he wrote.

In 1919 he and Theresa Helburn led the group that created the Theatre Guild, where he supervised over 200 productions. He was also founder and Chairman of the American Shakespeare Festival, and with his wife, Armina Marshall, he created and operated the Westport Country Playhouse.

== Legal career ==
Langner went into patent law because his mother "didn't think the theater a very respectable profession". In 1903 he became a junior clerk for the Ben Greet Players' manager. Two years later he began studying patent law. He moved to the United States in 1911, and by 1913 his reputation as a patent attorney was established.

Beginning in 1917 Langner worked as a consultant about munitions patents for the government during World War I. After the war ended he was one of the people who drafted the patent section of the Treaty of Versailles.

In 1939 - 1945 Langner was executive seecretary for the National Advisory Council of the House of Representatives' Committee on Patents. While in that role he originated the concept of the National Inventors Council, which the U. S. Department of Commerce created in 1940. He became secretary of the council.

Langner achieved international status as a patent attorney and was a senior partner in the Langner, Parry, Card and Langner legal firm.

== Writing ==
Books that Langner wrote included an autobiography, Magic Curtain. He, his wife and partners, Theresa Helburn and Dore Schary received the 1958 Tony Award for best play production for Sunrise at Campobello. He adapted plays from other languages for production in American theaters.

Langner wrote articles about trademark law and international patent law that were published in periodicals.

== Personal life and death ==
Langner was first married to Estelle Roege. His second marriage was to Armina Marshall. He died on December 26, 1962, in his home in New York City, aged 72.

== Recognition ==
In 1960 Langner received the Connecticut Bar Association's Distinguished Public Service Award.

== Best known works ==
- The Pursuit of Happiness
- Sunrise at Campobello
- Magic Curtain (autobiography)
- The Importance of Wearing Clothes (Hastings House, 1959)
