= George H. Kondolf =

American theatre and radio producer

George H. Kondolf (March 13, 1900 – December 25, 1985) was an American theatrical and radio producer. He was an associate of George Cukor and was, for two turbulent years, director of the Federal Theatre Project in New York City.

== Early years ==
George Henry Kondolf was born March 13, 1900, in Rochester, New York. His father, George V. Kondolf, was born in Alsace-Lorraine in 1850 and his mother, Ann E. Kondolf, was born in Ireland in 1851. He attended West High School, where he was known as "Junie Kondolf". He attended the University of Rochester and Harvard University

== Early career ==
Kondolf was a business associate of George Cukor. Cukor had become actor and Co-Manager of the newly formed Lyceum Players at the old Lyceum Theater in Rochester in 1922, and, by 1925, Korndolf and Cukor became co-producers of this summer stock company. In 1926, the Lyceum Players becomes the Cukor-Kondolf Company when the troupe was forced to move from the Lyceum Theater to the Temple Theater in Rochester.

In the first half of 1925, Korndolf stage managed the first three plays of the newly created Rochester Community Players, as well as assisting in the scene design for these early productions.

Kondolf continued to operate a summer stock company in Rochester through 1931, when he operated under the name Kondolf-Folmer Company, with Walter Former, at the Temple and Lyceum Theaters. In 1930 he also operated a Buffalo company that summer at the Erlangers Theater.

== Management of the Empire Theatre ==
Kondolf was appointed acting manager of the Empire Theatre (1430 Broadway), the "oldest and most distinctive playhouse " controlled by Charles Frohman, Inc. While managing the Empire in February 1927, its presentation of The Captive was shut down for criminal indecency. Kondolf and the cast (which included Basil Rathbone) and the producer were arrested. The Captive had been in performance for five months and had been "acquitted" of immorality or indecency by "the citizens play jury", sponsored by the District Attorney, but the chief Magistrate for the City issued warrants for the arrests of the cast of that production and two others. A week later the show was voluntarily withdrawn and charges dismissed against the producer, Kondolf and three cast members, who had agreed never to act in The Captive again for anybody. Kondolf moved on to manage the Blackstone Theater in Chicago by 1932.

== Federal Theatre Project ==
George Kondolf was director of the Federal Theatre Project in Chicago in 1936 and 1937, before becoming its director in New York City in September 1937. Multiple articles indicate that his tenure there was stormy, with much labor union strife. See, e.g., New York Times February 15, 1938 ("WPA Art Projects Reduce Expenses ... Anti-Labor Bias Denied"); May 28, 1938 ("Kondolf Defends WPA Theatre Record; Holds Workers Alliance Attack 'Hysterical and False'"), Nov. 11, 1938 ("WPA Theatre Faces Shake-up of Staff; Federal Project Already Has New Alignment of Personnel"); December 14, 1938 ("WPA Equity Deputies Ask Kondolf Ouster; Director Holding Up Progress, Actors' Group Charges"); December 17, 1938 ("Equity Sifts Row in Wpa Theatre; 800 at Meeting Hear Charges Against Kondolf Repeated; He Explains Stewardship"), July 1, 1939 ("One Controversy After Another in Four-Year History of Theatre Project.") Although he also oversaw the WPA Negro Theatre Project, J. Augustus Smith, who Kondolf fired from his position as project director, noted that Kondolf "fired or demoted" all the Black individuals in supervisory roles within the organization, and that Kondolf "didn't believe Negros could do serious drama."

As summarized by The New York Times in its obituary of Kondolf, "While such productions were successful with the public, they also led to controversy, often involving labor disputes. Mr. Kondolf dealt with calls by Broadway producers for the abolition of the project, on the ground that it was unfair competition. The plays of the project, often tales about capitalism and labor, also brought charges from the House Committee on Un-American Activities that the project produced plays favoring radical workers."

== Later career ==
After the Federal Theatre Project ended in 1939, Kondolf became an independent producer of radio programs. Four years later he joined the advertising agency of Batten, Barton, Durstine & Osborn as an editor and producer. For the agency he produced numerous radio programs including Du Pont Cavalcade of America and the United States Steel Corporation's Theater Guild of the Air, which premiered September 9, 1945 In 1958, he left the agency to become producer of The U.S. Steel Hour, a live television dramatic show produced by the Theater Guild. Among the Broadway shows that he produced are The Fifth Season, from 1953 to 1955; Hell Freezes Over, Joshua Logan's first directorial effort, from 1935 to 1936, and The 49th Cousin in 1960. " His other Broadway productions included Hangman's Whip (1933), The Wind and the Rain (1934), A Room in Red and White (1936), and Morning Star (1940).

== Personal life and death ==
On August 21, 1953, Kondolf married Winonah Murphy, a color consultant for an appliance manufacturer, in Toms River, New Jersey. They had a son and a daughter. He died of a stroke at his home in Locust, New Jersey, on December 25, 1985, aged 85.
