= List of awards and nominations received by Fiddler on the Roof =

Fiddler on the Roof was one of the most successful musicals of the "golden age of musicals". Its original Broadway production in 1964 was the first run of a musical in history to surpass the 3,000 performance mark. Fiddler held the record for the longest-running Broadway musical for almost 10 years until Grease surpassed its run. The production was extraordinarily profitable and highly acclaimed. A successful 1971 film adaptation, and the show has enjoyed enduring international popularity, continuing to be a very popular choice for school and community productions.

The original production was nominated for ten Tony Awards, winning nine, including Best Musical, score, book, direction, and Robbins won for best direction and choreography. Zero Mostel and Maria Karnilova won as best leading actor and featured actress. In 1972, the show won a special Tony on becoming the longest-running musical in Broadway history. Its revivals have also been honored. At the 1981 Tony Awards, Bernardi was nominated as best actor. Ten years later, the 1991 revival won for best revival, and Topol was nominated as best actor. The 2004 revival was nominated for six Tony Awards and three Drama Desk Awards but won none. The 2007 West End revival was nominated for Olivier Awards for best revival, and Goodman was nominated as best actor.

The musical's major awards and nominations are listed below:

== Original Broadway production ==
Year	Award Ceremony	Category	Nominee	Result
1965	Tony Award	Best Musical		Won
1965	Tony Award	Best Book of a Musical	Joseph Stein	Won
1965	Tony Award	Best Performance by a Leading Actor in a Musical	Zero Mostel	Won
1965	Tony Award	Best Performance by a Featured Actress in a Musical	Maria Karnilova	Won
1965	Tony Award	Best Producer	Harold Prince	Won
1965	Tony Award	Best Director	Jerome Robbins	Won
1965	Tony Award	Best Composer and Lyricist	Jerry Bock and Sheldon Harnick	Won
1965	Tony Award	Best Choreography	Jerome Robbins	Won
1965	Tony Award	Best Costume Design	Patricia Zipprodt	Won
1965	Tony Award	Best Scenic Design	Boris Aronson	Nominated
1965	New York Drama Critics' Circle Award	Best Musical	Jerry Bock, Sheldon Harnick and Joseph Stein	Won
1972	Tony Award (special)	Longest-running Musical in Broadway History		Won

== 1981 Broadway revival ==
Year	Award Ceremony	Category	Nominee	Result
1981	Tony Award	Best Performance by a Leading Actor in a Musical	Herschel Bernardi	Nominated

== 1990 Broadway revival ==
Year	Award Ceremony	Category	Nominee	Result
1991	Tony Award	Best Revival of a Musical		Won
1991	Tony Award	Best Performance by a Leading Actor in a Musical	Topol	Nominated

== 2004 Broadway revival ==
Year	Award Ceremony	Category	Nominee	Result
2004	Tony Award	Best Revival of a Musical		Nominated
2004	Tony Award	Best Performance by a Leading Actor in a Musical	Alfred Molina	Nominated
2004	Tony Award	Best Performance by a Featured Actor in a Musical	John Cariani	Nominated
2004	Tony Award	Best Scenic Design	Tom Pye	Nominated
2004	Tony Award	Best Lighting Design	Brian MacDevitt	Nominated
2004	Tony Award	Best Orchestrations	Don Walker and Larry Hochman	Nominated
2004	Drama Desk Award	Outstanding Revival of a Musical		Nominated
2004	Drama Desk Award	Outstanding Actor in a Musical	Alfred Molina	Nominated
2004	Drama Desk Award	Outstanding Set Design	Tom Pye	Nominated

== 2007 London revival ==
Year	Award Ceremony	Category	Nominee	Result
2008	Laurence Olivier Award	Best Musical Revival		Nominated
2008	Laurence Olivier Award	Best Actor in a Musical	Henry Goodman	Nominated

== 2015 Broadway revival ==
Year	Award Ceremony	Category	Nominee	Result
2016	Tony Award	Best Revival of a Musical		Nominated
2016	Tony Award	Best Actor in a Musical	Danny Burstein	Nominated
2016	Tony Award	Best Choreography	Hofesh Shechter	Nominated
2016	Drama Desk Award	Outstanding Revival of a Musical		Nominated
2016	Drama Desk Award	Outstanding Actor in a Musical	Danny Burstein	Won
2016	Drama Desk Award	Outstanding Director of a Musical	Bartlett Sher	Won
2016	Drama League Award	Outstanding Revival of a Broadway or Off-Broadway Musical		Nominated
2016	Drama League Award	Distinguished Performance	Danny Burstein	Nominated
2016	Outer Critics Circle Award	Outstanding Revival of a Musical (Broadway or Off-Broadway)		Nominated
2016	Outer Critics Circle Award	Outstanding Actor in a Musical	Danny Burstein	Won
2017	Grammy Award	Best Musical Theater Album		Nominated

== 2018 Yiddish production ==
Year	Award Ceremony	Category	Nominee	Result
2019	Lucille Lortel Awards	Outstanding Revival		Nominated
2019	Lucille Lortel Awards	Outstanding Director	Joel Grey	Nominated
2019	Lucille Lortel Awards	Outstanding Lead Actor in a Musical	Steven Skybell	Won
2019	Lucille Lortel Awards	Outstanding Featured Actress in a Musical	Jackie Hoffman	Nominated
2019	Drama League Award	Outstanding Revival of a Broadway or Off-Broadway Musical		Nominated
2019	Drama League Award	Distinguished Performance Award	Steven Skybell	Nominated
2019	Drama Desk Award	Outstanding Revival of a Musical		Won
2019	Drama Desk Award	Outstanding Actor in a Musical	Steven Skybell	Nominated
2019	Drama Desk Award	Outstanding Director of a Musical	Joel Grey	Nominated
2019	Drama Desk Award	Outstanding Orchestrations	Larry Blank	Nominated
2019	Outer Critics Circle Award	Outstanding Revival of a Musical		Won
2019	Outer Critics Circle Award	Outstanding Director of a Musical	Joel Grey	Nominated
2019	Outer Critics Circle Award	Outstanding Actor in a Musical	Steven Skybell	Nominated
2019	Chita Rivera Awards	Outstanding Ensemble		Nominated
2019	Off-Broadway Alliance Awards	Best Musical Revival		Won
2019	New York Drama Critics' Circle Awards	Special Citation		Won

== 2019 West End revival ==
Year	Award Ceremony	Category	Nominee	Result
2019	Evening Standard Theatre Awards	Best Musical		Nominated
2019	Evening Standard Theatre Awards	Best Musical Performance	Andy Nyman	Nominated
2020	Laurence Olivier Awards	Best Musical Revival		Won
2020	Laurence Olivier Awards	Best Actor in a Musical	Andy Nyman	Nominated
2020	Laurence Olivier Awards	Best Actress in a Musical	Judy Kuhn	Nominated
2020	Laurence Olivier Awards	Best Actor in a Supporting Role in a Musical	Stewart Clarke	Nominated
2020	Laurence Olivier Awards	Best Director	Trevor Nunn	Nominated
2020	Laurence Olivier Awards	Best Theatre Choreographer	Matt Cole	Nominated
2020	Laurence Olivier Awards	Best Costume Design	Jonathan Lipman	Nominated
2020	Laurence Olivier Awards	Best Original Score or New Orchestrations	Jason Carr	Nominated

== 2024 London revival ==
Year	Award Ceremony	Category	Nominee	Result
2025	Laurence Olivier Awards	Best Musical Revival		Won
2025	Laurence Olivier Awards	Best Actor in a Musical	Adam Dannheisser	Nominated
2025	Laurence Olivier Awards	Best Actress in a Musical	Lara Pulver	Nominated
2025	Laurence Olivier Awards	Best Actor in a Supporting Role in a Musical	Raphael Papo	Nominated
2025	Laurence Olivier Awards	Best Actress in a Supporting Role in a Musical	Liv Andrusier	Nominated
2025	Laurence Olivier Awards	Best Actress in a Supporting Role in a Musical	Beverley Klein	Nominated
2025	Laurence Olivier Awards	Best Director	Jordan Fein	Nominated
2025	Laurence Olivier Awards	Best Theatre Choreographer	Julia Cheng	Nominated
2025	Laurence Olivier Awards	Best Set Design	Tom Scutt	Won
2025	Laurence Olivier Awards	Best Costume Design	Tom Scutt	Nominated
2025	Laurence Olivier Awards	Best Lighting Design	Aideen Malone	Nominated
2025	Laurence Olivier Awards	Best Sound Design	Nick Lidster	Won
2025	Laurence Olivier Awards	Outstanding Musical Contribution	Mark Aspinall	Nominated
