= Raquel Nobile =

Theater and film actor

Raquel Nobile is a New York City-based theater and film actor.

While still a student at the Manhattan School of Music, Nobile was featured in two film operas (Connection Lost: The Tinder Opera, and Something Blue: The Bachelor Opera) directed by Adam Taylor with scores by Scott Joiner. She later appearing in a third musical film (Someone Like Me: The Facebook Opera) by the same director. Raquel performed in the National Yiddish Theater Folksbiene's Off-Broadway run of Amerike the Golden Land, which opened July 4, 2017 and performed for 6 weeks including a 2 weeks extension before it closed on August 20, 2017. Raquel also performed in the Folksbiene's sold out run of The Sorceress in December 2017, a performance as part of the Folksbiene's restoration process. She was awarded the National Theater Conference's Emerging Professional of 2018 for her work with the Folksbiene.

Also in 2018, Raquel joined the cast of Fidler Afn Dakh, a Yiddish-language adaptation of the musical Fiddler on the Roof, in the role of Shprintze (Tevye's fourth eldest daughter), at the Folksbiene – continuing with the show as it transferred to Stage 42 and won the Drama Desk Award for Best Revival of a Musical in June, 2019.

Together with Maya Jacobson and Jodi Snyder, fellow castmates in Fidler Afn Dakh, she is a member of “The Mamales,” a Barry Sisters-inspired Yiddish singing trio founded by Jacobson. Initially financed with a GoFundMe campaign, they released their first video on April 15, 2022, Abi Gezunt. Jacobson and Snyder are Jewish. Nobile, of Puerto Rican and Italian heritage, is not Jewish, but “fell in love with the Yiddish language and the culture” upon first performing with the Folksbiene in 2017.
