= Steven Skybell =

American actor

- Born: Amarillo, Texas, U.S.
- Education: Yale University (BA, MFA)
- Occupation: Actor
- Years active: 1988-present
- Awards: Tony Award nomination for Best Featured Actor in a Musical (for Cabaret); Lucille Lortel Award for Outstanding Lead Actor in a Musical (for Fidler Afn Dakh).
- Website: Stevenskybell.com

Steven Skybell (born in 1988) is a theater, film and television actor. He has performed on Broadway, Off-Broadway, in regional theater productions, on television, and in film.

== Biography ==
=== Early life and education ===
Skybell grew up in Lubbock, Texas, and performed in two productions of Fiddler on the Roof from an early age: First as a "chuppa boy" and then Tevye at the Interlochen Center for the Arts summer camp. He went on to attend the Yale School of Drama, performing alongside Jodie Foster in Getting Out, directed by Tina Landau. At Yale, Steven would reprise the role of Tevye again.

=== On stage (2000s-2010s) ===
Skybell worked with Stephen Schwartz and Joe Mantello on the workshop for Wicked, playing the character Doctor Dillamond. He would later reprise this role in the Chicago and Broadway productions, as well as on the Wicked National Tour. They held adjunct faculty positions at the New York University Tisch School of the Arts and at Fordham University in their theater departments. His credits in the 2000s and early 2010s would include productions by the Classic Stage Company and Shakespeare in the Park. During this time, Skybell yearned to play Tevye again when he was much closer to the character's age.

=== Fiddler on the Roof and Fidler Afn Dakh (2015–2022) ===
In 2015, Skybell took over the role of Lazar Wolf in a Broadway production of Fiddler on the Roof. He starred as Tevye in the all-Yiddish production, directed by Joel Grey, Fidler Afn Dakh at the Museum of Jewish Heritage by National Yiddish Theatre Folksbiene. The production was a critical success, leading to four separate extensions. In February 2019, the show transferred uptown to Stage 42 where it played until January 5, 2020. For his portrayal of Tevye, Skybell won the Lucille Lortel Award for Outstanding Lead Actor in a Musical, and was nominated for the Drama League Distinguished Performance Award, Drama Desk Award for Outstanding Actor in a Musical, and Outer Critics Circle Award for Outstanding Actor in a Musical. Skybell would reprise his role as Tevye at the Lyric Opera of Chicago, his first English performance in the role on a larger stage, and again for a limited run of the Yiddish version at New World Stages both in 2022.

=== Cabaret (2024) ===
In 2024, Skybell played Herr Schultz in Cabaret at the Kit Kat Club, opposite Bebe Neuwirth as Fraulein Schneider. The two had previously worked together for a Classic Stage Company production of A Midsummer Night's Dream. In this role, he received his first Tony Award nomination, for Best Featured Actor in a Musical.

== Stage credits ==
Year	Show	Role	Production Level	Notes	Ref
2025	Fidler Afn Dakh	Tevye	Concert	Younes and Soraya Nazarian Center for the Performing Arts September 13 - 14, 2025	
2024	Cabaret at the Kit Kat Club	Herr Schultz	Broadway	August Wilson Theater April 21, 2024 - September 21, 2025	
2023	Amid Falling Walls	Performer	Regional	Museum of Jewish Heritage November 20, 2023 - December 10, 2023	
2023	The Lehman Trilogy	Henry Lehman	Boston, MA	Huntington Theatre Company June 13, 2023 - July 16, 2023	
2022	Fiddler on the Roof	Tevye	Chicago, IL	Lyric Opera of Chicago September 17, 2022 - October 7, 2022	
2022	Fidler Afn Dakh	Tevye	Off-Broadway	New World Stages November 21, 2022 - January 1, 2023	
2019	Fidler Afn Dakh	Tevye	Off-Broadway	Stage 42 February 21, 2019 - January 5, 2020 (moved from Museum of Jewish Heritage production after 4 extensions)	
2018	Fidler Afn Dakh	Tevye	Off-Broadway	Museum of Jewish Heritage July 4, 2018 - December 30, 2018	
2016	Fiddler on the Roof	Lazar Wolf	Broadway	Broadway Theater June 14 - September 4, 2016	
2015	Cymbeline	Gaoler, Pisanio, Frenchman	Off-Broadway	Shakespeare in the Park August 10, 2015 - August 23, 2015	
2014	A Man's a Man	Jesse Mahoney	Off-Broadway	Classic Stage Company January 30, 2014 - February 16, 2014	
2012	A Midsummer Night's Dream	Bottom	Off-Broadway	Classic Stage Company April 29, 2012 - May 20, 2012	
2012	Gallileo	Performer	Off-Broadway	Classic Stage Company February 12, 2012 - March 18, 2012	
2011	Love's Labour's Lost	Holofernes	Off-Broadway	The Public Theater October 31, 2011 - November 6, 2011	
2010	Wicked	Doctor Dillamond	National tour	August 3, 2010 - April, 2011	
2006	Wicked	Doctor Dillamond	Broadway	Gershwin Theatre August 8, 2006 - September 1, 2008	
2005	Wicked	Doctor Dillamond	Chicago, IL	Nederlander Theatre (Chicago) July 13, 2005 - Mar 27, 2006	
2002	Wicked	Doctor Dillamond	Workshop	Sings "As If By Magic", a song cut from the final score	
2008	Pal Joey	Ernest	Broadway	Studio 54 December 11, 2008 - March 1, 2009	
2005	The Controversy Of Valladolid	Sepulvelda	Off-Broadway	The Public Theater February 20, 2005 - March 13, 2005	
2004	The Bald Soprano And The Lesson	The Professor	Off-Broadway	Atlantic Theater Company September 19, 2004 - October 17, 2004	
