= Stephanie Lynne Mason =

American actress

Stephanie Lynne Mason is a New York City-based theater actress. She has performed in several theatrical productions including Broadway theatre.

== Biography ==
=== Early life and education ===
Mason grew up in Columbus, Ohio. Her paternal great-grandfather was a Sicilian fisherman. She graduated from Columbus Academy in 2005. Her father died from leukemia in 2008. She moved to New York City directly after high school and got a talent agent.

=== Career ===
At age 19, for her first professional performance, she was cast as Maria in West Side Story at Houston’s Theater Under the Stars.

Mason made her Broadway theatre debut as swing in the 2015 revival of Fiddler on the Roof. It opened November 12, 2015 and closed December 31, 2016, running a total of 431 performances. She also performed in Axis Theater Company's Evening 1910 which opened May 8, 2016 and performed for 3 weeks closing May 28, 2016. She played Dyanne in the national tour of Million Dollar Quartet, a jukebox musical celebrating early rock and roll stars, in September 2016.

Mason has also performed with Folksbiene in their Off-Broadway run of Amerike the Golden Land which opened July 4, 2017 and performed for 6 weeks including a 2 weeks extension, closing August 20, 2017.

She also performed in the Folksbiene sold-out run of The Sorceress in December 2017, a performance as part of the Folksbiene's restoration process led by artistic director Zalmen Mlotek. She had to learn Yiddish language for the performance.

In April 2018, she appeared in the concert 'Rise Too: Our Story' a benefit performance for arthritis at the Davenport Theatre.

In the summer of 2018, Mason performed in the premiere of Fidler Afn Dakh as Hodel at the Folksbiene – continuing with the show as it won the Drama Desk Award for Best Revival of a Musical in June 2019.

In the fall of 2023, she played Carole King in Beautiful: The Carole King Musical at the John Engeman Theater.

== Stage credits ==
Year	Show	Role	Production Level	Notes
2017	Fidler Afn Dakh	Hodel	Off-Broadway	Museum of Jewish Heritage July 15, 2018 – August 20, 2018
2017	The Sorceress	Mirelle	Off-Broadway	Museum of Jewish Heritage December 25, 2017 – January 1, 2018
2017	Amerike the Golden Land	Ensemble	Off-Broadway	Museum of Jewish Heritage July 4, 2017 – August 20, 2017
2016	Million Dollar Quartet	Dyanne	National Tour	Arrow Rock Lyceum Theatre; September 7, 2016 – September 18, 2016
2015	Fiddler on the Roof	Swing	Broadway	Broadway Theatre; November 12, 2015 – December 31, 2016
2016	Evening 1910	Kate	Off-Broadway	Axis Theatre; May 8, 2016 – May 28, 2016
