= NYTF =

NYTF may refer to:

- National Yiddish Theatre Folksbiene
- New York Television Festival
