= Joel Grey =

American actor, singer, dancer, director, and photographer (born 1932)

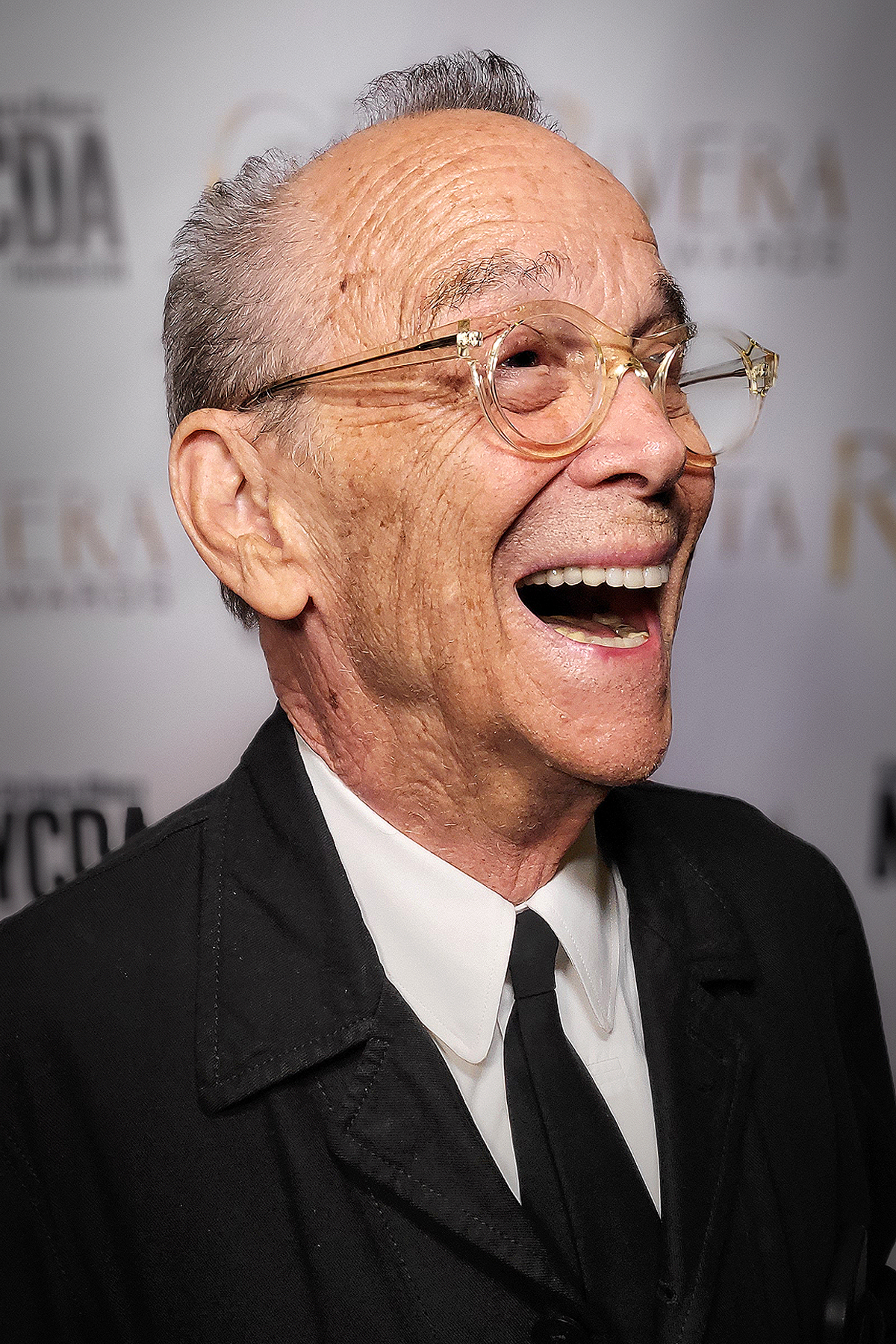
- Grey in 2022
- Born: Joel David Katz; April 11, 1932 (age 94); Cleveland, Ohio, U.S.
- Occupations: Actor; dancer; singer; photographer; theatre director
- Years active: 1951–2024
- Spouse: Jo Wilder (m. 1958; div. 1982)
- Children: 2, including Jennifer
- Father: Mickey Katz
- Relatives: Ronald A. Katz (brother)

Joel Grey (born Joel David Katz; April 11, 1932) is an American actor, singer, dancer, photographer, and theatre director. He is best known for portraying the Master of Ceremonies in the musical Cabaret on Broadway and in Bob Fosse's 1972 film adaptation. He has won an Academy Award, a BAFTA Award, a Golden Globe Award, and a Tony Award for his performances in the Cabaret stage musical and film. He was presented a Lifetime Achievement Tony Award at the 76th Tony Awards in 2023.

Grey's Tony-nominated roles include for the musical George M! (1968), Goodtime Charley (1975), and The Grand Tour (1979). After portraying Amos Hart in the Broadway revival of Chicago (1996), he originated the role of the Wizard of Oz in the musical Wicked (2003) and played Moonface Martin in the 2011 revival of Anything Goes. He co-directed the 2011 revival of Larry Kramer's The Normal Heart with George C. Wolfe, earning a Tony Award nomination for Best Direction of a Play at the 65th Tony Awards.

He earned a Golden Globe Award for Best Supporting Actor – Motion Picture nomination for his role in Remo Williams: The Adventure Begins (1985) at the 43rd Golden Globe Awards. His other film roles include in Buffalo Bill and the Indians, or Sitting Bull's History Lesson (1976), Kafka (1991), The Music of Chance (1993), The Fantasticks (2000), and Dancer in the Dark (2000). He earned an Emmy nomination for Outstanding Guest Actor in a Comedy Series at the 45th Primetime Emmy Awards for Brooklyn Bridge (1993). He also acted in Oz (2003), Alias (2005), House (2006), Nurse Jackie (2011), and The Old Man (2022).

== Early life ==
Joel Grey was born Joel David Katz on April 11, 1932, in Cleveland, Ohio, the son of Goldie "Grace" (née Epstein) and Mickey Katz, an actor, comedian, and musician. Both his parents were Jewish. He attended Alexander Hamilton High School in Los Angeles.

== Career ==
=== Early career ===
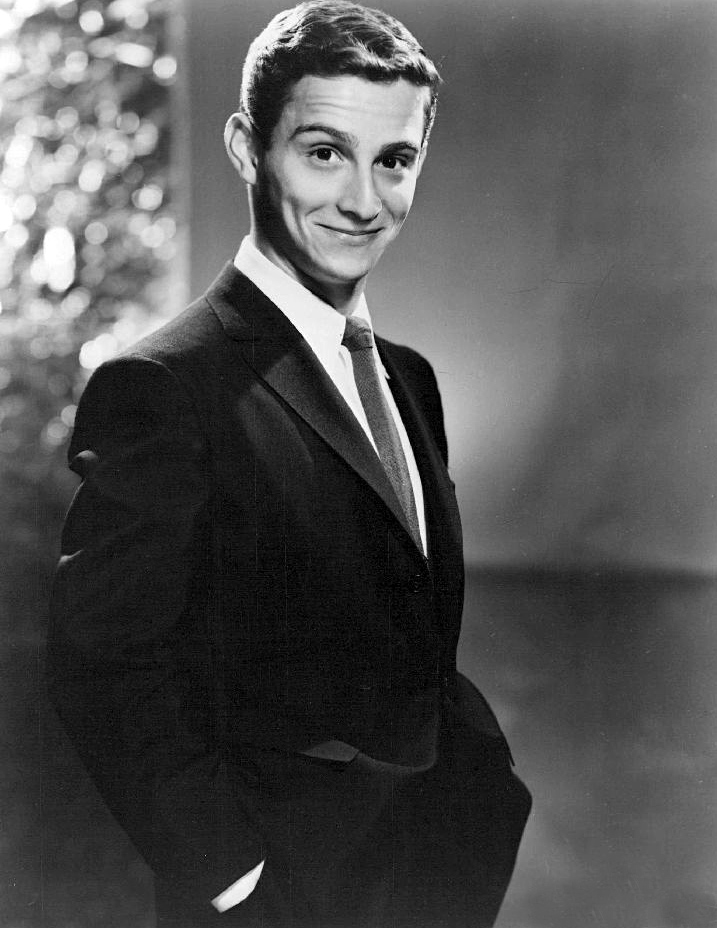
Grey in a publicity photo in 1955

Grey started his career, at age 10, in the Cleveland Play House's Curtain Pullers children's theatre program in the early 1940s, appearing in productions such as Grandmother Slyboots, Jack of Tarts and a lead role in their mainstage production of On Borrowed Time. By 1952, at age 20, he was appearing as a featured performer at the Copacabana nightclub in New York. He changed his last name from Katz to Grey early in his career due to the stigma associated with having a surname with an obvious ethnicity attached. Grey made his Broadway acting debut in Borscht Capades where he was credited as "Joel Kaye". He returned to Broadway in The Littlest Revue in 1956 and acted as a replacement in Neil Simon's Come Blow Your Horn in 1961 and the musicals Stop the World – I Want to Get Off in 1962, and Half a Sixpence in 1965.

He started his professional television career on The Colgate Comedy Hour from 1951 to 1954. He then took on roles in the late 1950s and early 1960s, Grey appeared in several TV westerns including Maverick (1959), Bronco (1960) and Lawman (3 times in 1960 and 1961).

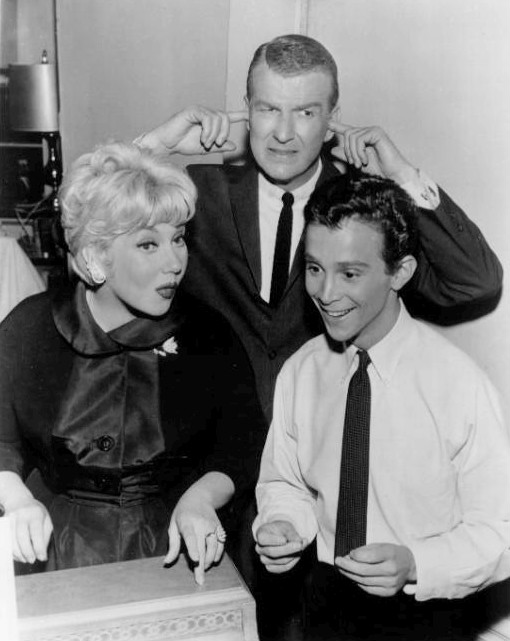
Grey with Ann Sothern and Don Porter on The Ann Sothern Show, 1960

=== 1966–1979: Breakthrough ===
Grey gained his breakthrough performance originating the role of Emcee in the Broadway musical Cabaret by John Kander and Fred Ebb in 1966. He received raves for his role as the malevolent and sinister master of ceremonies of the Kit Kat Club. He won the Tony Award for Best Featured Actor in a Musical at the 21st Tony Awards.

Grey appeared as a panelist for the television game show What's My Line? in the 1967 season, as well as being the first Mystery Guest during its syndication in 1968. His followup role on Broadway was as George M. Cohan in the 1968 musical George M!. Grey was nominated for the Tony Award for Best Actor in a Musical at the 23rd Tony Awards and received the Outer Critics Circle Award for Outstanding Performance.

Grey reprised his role as the Master of ceremonies in the 1972 Bob Fosse directed film version of Cabaret. Fosse, who was hired to direct the film version because Harold Prince was unavailable, wanted to recast the Emcee role, but the studio insisted on Grey. Fosse backed down on his "It's either me or Joel" threat, but relations between them were cool. He won the Academy Award for Best Supporting Actor at the 45th Academy Awards in March 1973 for his performance. His victory was part of a Cabaret near-sweep, which saw Liza Minnelli win Best Actress and Fosse win Best Director, although it lost the Best Picture Oscar to The Godfather. For that role, Grey also won the BAFTA Award for Most Promising Newcomer at the 26th British Academy Film Awards and Best Supporting Actor awards from the Golden Globes, Kansas City Film Critics Circle, National Board of Review of Motion Pictures, National Society of Film Critics, and a Tony Award for his original stage performance six years prior, making him one of only ten people who have won both a Tony Award and an Academy Award for the same role.

He was the guest star for the fourth episode of The Muppet Show in its first season in 1976, singing "Razzle Dazzle" from Chicago and "Willkommen" from Cabaret. He has performed at The Muny in St. Louis, Missouri, in roles such as George M. Cohan in George M! (1970 and 1992), the Emcee in Cabaret (1971), and Joey Evans in Pal Joey (1983). At the Williamstown Theatre Festival, Grey played the title role of Mikhail Platonov in their production of Platonov (1977). He returned to Broadway in the play Goodtime Charley (1975), and the musical The Grand Tour (1979), receiving Tony nominations for each.

=== 1980–1999 ===
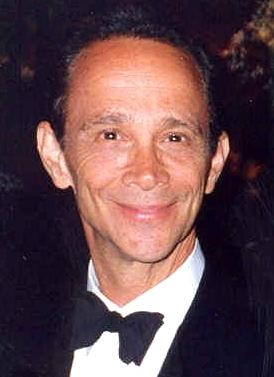
Grey at the 45th Emmy Awards, 1993

He also played Master of Sinanju Chiun, Remo Williams (Fred Ward)'s elderly Korean martial arts master in the movie Remo Williams: The Adventure Begins (1985), a role that garnered him a nomination for the Saturn Award for Best Supporting Actor at the 13th Saturn Awards and a second Golden Globe nomination for Best Supporting Actor in a Motion Picture at the 43rd Golden Globe Awards. Grey's character Chiun was popular for the lines "Meat of cow kills", and "You move like a pregnant yak", from the movie. He then acted in Steven Soderbergh's mystery thriller Kafka (1991), starring Jeremy Irons, Theresa Russell and Ian Holm. In 1991, he played Adam, a devil, in "Conundrum", a two-part season 14 episode and the series finale of the television series Dallas (1991). That same year, Grey also appeared in the American Repertory Theater's production of When We Dead Awaken at the São Paulo Biennial.

He narrated the animated film Tom and Jerry: The Movie (1992), and made a cameo appearance as himself in the Robert Altman film The Player (1992). The following year he starred in the Philip Haas drama film The Music of Chance (1993) alongside James Spader, Mandy Patinkin, M. Emmet Walsh, and Charles Durning. The film premiered at the 1993 Cannes Film Festival. Later that year he starred in New York Stage and Film's production of John Patrick Shanley's A Fool and Her Fortune and received a nomination for the Primetime Emmy Award for Outstanding Guest Actor in a Comedy Series at the 45th Primetime Emmy Awards for his recurring role as Jacob Prossman on the television series Brooklyn Bridge. In 1995, he made a guest appearance on the Star Trek: Voyager episode "Resistance" as Caylem, an aging rebel seeking to free his (deceased) wife from prison. In November 1995, he performed as the Wizard of Oz in The Wizard of Oz in Concert: Dreams Come True, a staged concert of the popular story at Lincoln Center to benefit the Children's Defense Fund. The performance was originally broadcast on Turner Network Television (TNT) in November 1995, and released on CD and video in 1996.

He returned to Broadway as Amos Hart in the revival of the Bob Fosse musical Chicago (1996). Set in Chicago in the Jazz Age, the musical is based on a 1926 play of the same title by reporter Maurine Dallas Watkins, about actual criminals and crimes on which she reported. The story is a satire on corruption in the administration of criminal justice and the concept of the "celebrity criminal". The revival was well received and Grey earned the Drama Desk Award for Outstanding Featured Actor in a Musical. In 1999, he starred in Brian Friel's Give Me Your Answer, Do! mounted by Roundabout Theatre Company.

=== 2000–2010 ===
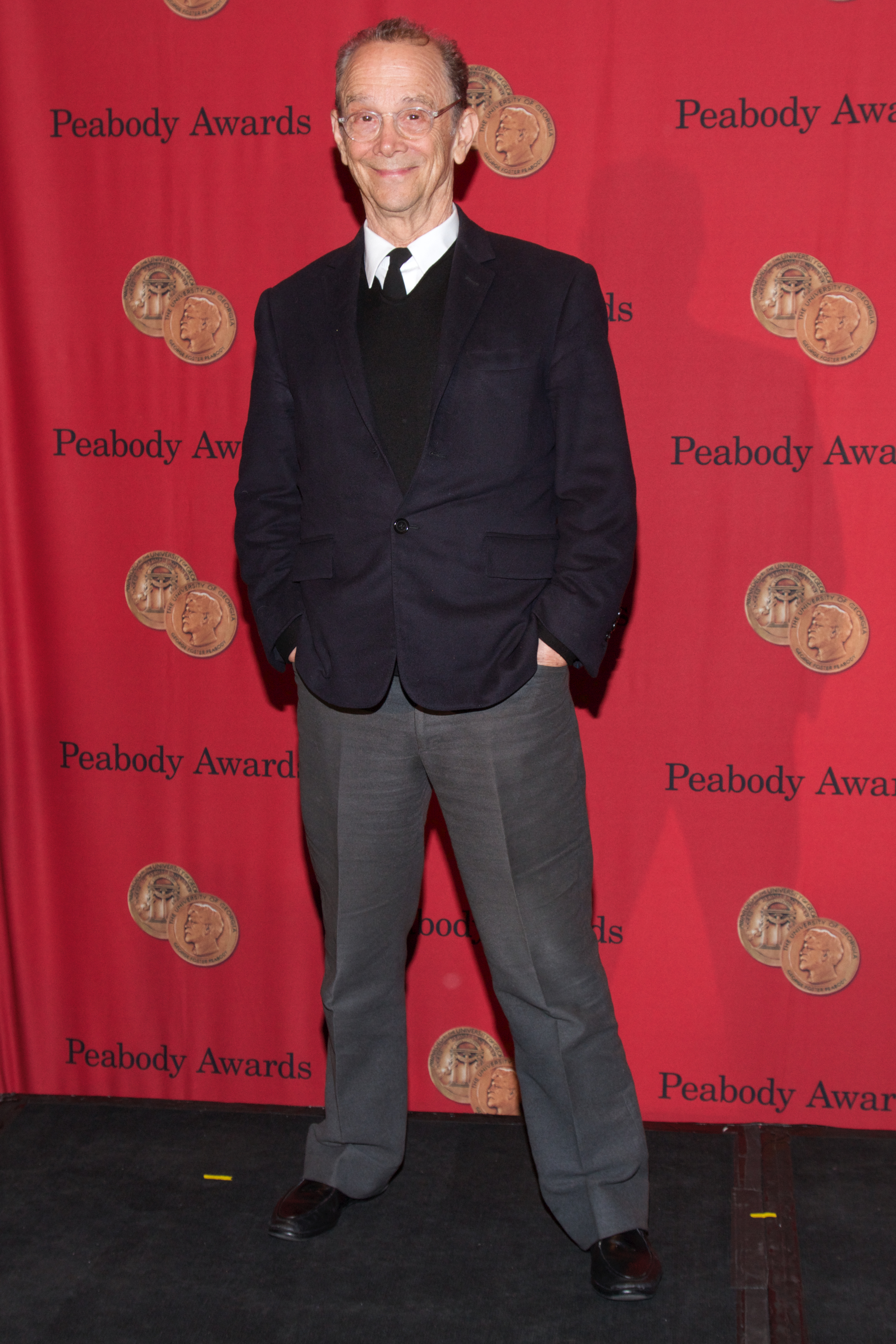
Grey at the 2014 Peabody Awards

In 2000, Grey played Oldrich Novy in the Lars von Trier film Dancer in the Dark and acted in the musical film The Fantasticks and in the dark comedy Choke (2008). During this time he also appeared extensively on television. He had a recurring role as the evil reptilian demon Doc in The WB horror series Buffy the Vampire Slayer (2001), Lemuel Idzik in the HBO prison drama Oz (2003) and as Another Mr. Sloane in the ABC series Alias (2005). He played Milton Winters, a wealthy, paroled ex-convict on Law & Order: Criminal Intent (episode "Cuba Libre", 2003). He also appeared on the shows House and Brothers & Sisters (2007), on the latter of which he played the role of Dr. Bar-Shalom, Sarah Walker (Rachel Griffiths) and Joe Whedon (John Pyper-Ferguson)'s marriage counselor. He appeared as Dr. Singer, Dr. Izzie Stevens (Katherine Heigl)'s high school teacher who needs treatment for dementia in Grey's Anatomy (2009).

Grey originated the role of the Wizard of Oz in the Stephen Schwartz Broadway musical Wicked. Grey took over the role from Robert Morse who previously played the Wizard in the San Francisco tryout run at the Curran Theatre. Grey acted alongside Idina Menzel and Kristin Chenoweth. The play received mixed reviews from critics but was an immediate financial hit. Grey was nominated for the Outer Critics Circle Award for Outstanding Featured Actor in a Musical.

=== 2011–present ===
Grey returned to Broadway in spring 2011 as Moonface Martin in the Roundabout Theatre Company revival of Anything Goes at the Stephen Sondheim Theatre. Having previously portrayed Ned Weeks in the 1985 Off-Broadway production of Larry Kramer's The Normal Heart, he went on to co-direct with George C. Wolfe the Tony Award-winning revival in 2011, for which he and Wolfe were nominated for Best Direction of a Play at the 65th Tony Awards. The following year he made a guest appearance in the Showtime series Nurse Jackie opposite Edie Falco. He also acted in CSI: Crime Scene Investigation (2014), and Park Bench with Steve Buscemi (2014).

Grey returned to Broadway in the 2016 revival of the Anton Chekhov play The Cherry Orchard starring opposite Diane Lane, and Chuck Cooper. In 2018, Grey directed a Yiddish-language production of Fiddler on the Roof, which originated at the National Yiddish Theatre Folksbiene, then transferred to Stage 42 Off-Broadway. The production became a surprise hit, running for over a year and winning the 2019 Drama Desk Award for Outstanding Revival of a Musical and Outer Critics Circle Award for Best Musical Revival. He had a cameo role in the Lin-Manuel Miranda directed musical Tick, Tick... Boom! (2021). In 2022 he acted as Morgan Bote, a recurring character in the FX drama series The Old Man starring Jeff Bridges and John Lithgow.

== Personal life ==
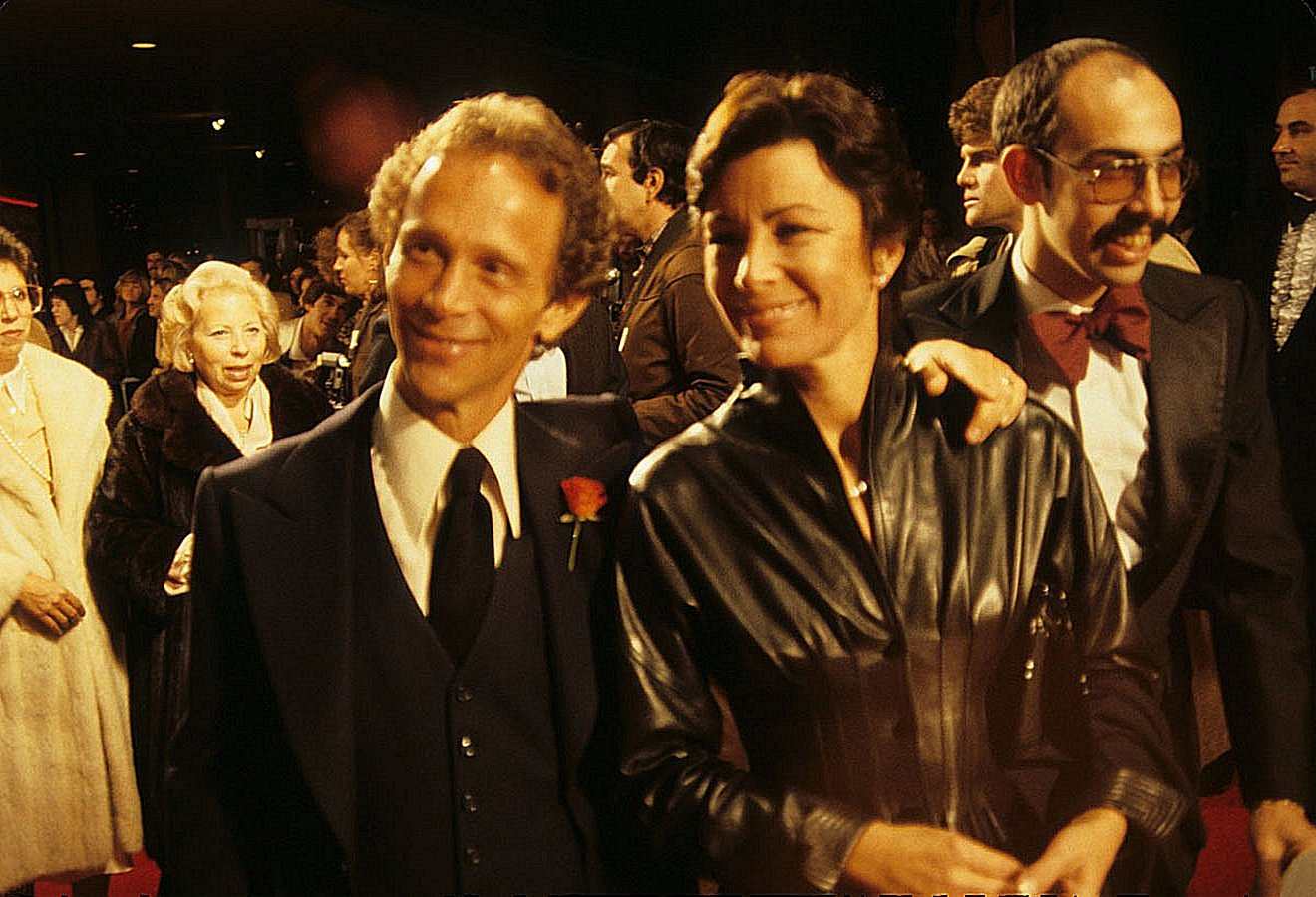
Grey with then-wife Jo Wilder in 1979

In 1958, Grey married Jo Wilder; they divorced in 1982. Together, they had two children: actress Jennifer Grey (star of the film Dirty Dancing) and chef James Grey.

Grey is a photographer. His first book of photographs, Pictures I Had to Take, was published in 2003. Its follow-up, Looking Hard at Unexpected Things, was published in 2006. His third book, 1.3 – Images from My Phone, a book of photographs taken with his camera phone, was published in 2009.

An exhibition of his work was held in April 2011 at the Museum of the City of New York, titled "Joel Grey/A New York Life." His fourth book, The Billboard Papers: Photographs by Joel Grey, came out in 2013 and depicts the many-layered billboards of New York City.

In January 2015, Grey discussed his sexuality in an interview with People, stating: "I don't like labels, but if you have to put a label on it, I'm a gay man."

Grey writes about his family, his acting career, and the challenges of being gay in his 2016 memoir, Master of Ceremonies.

== Performances and works ==
=== Film ===
Year	Title	Role	Notes
1952	About Face	Bender	
1957	Calypso Heat Wave	Alex Nash	
1961	Come September	Beagle	
1972	Cabaret	Master of Ceremonies	
1974	Man on a Swing	Franklin Wills	
1976	The Seven-Per-Cent Solution	Lowenstein	
1976	Buffalo Bill and the Indians, or Sitting Bull's History Lesson	Nate Salsbury	
1985	Remo Williams: The Adventure Begins	Chiun	
1991	Kafka	Burgel	
1992	The Player	Himself	Cameo appearance
1993	The Music of Chance	Willy Stone	
1994	The Dangerous	"Flea"	
1995	Venus Rising	Jimmie	
1996	The Empty Mirror	Joseph Goebbels	
1996	My Friend Joe	Simon	
2000	The Fantasticks	Amos Babcock Bellamy	
2000	Dancer in the Dark	Oldřich Nový	
2001	Reaching Normal	Dr. Mensley	
2008	Choke	Phil	
2021	Tick, Tick... Boom!	"Sunday" Legend	

=== Television ===
Year	Title	Role	Notes
1951–54	The Colgate Comedy Hour	Himself	4 episodes
1954	Pond's Theater	Performer	Episode: "Forty Weeks of Uncle Tom"
1956	Producers' Showcase	Jack	Episode: "Jack and the Beanstalk"
1957	Telephone Time	Ray	Episode: "The Intruder"
1957	December Bride	Jimmy	3 episodes
1957	The Pat Boone Chevy Showroom	Himself	4 episodes
1958	The Court of Last Resort	Floyd Todd	Episode: "The Todd-Loomis Case"
1959	Maverick	Billy "The Kid"	Episode: "Full House"
1960	Bronco	Samson "Runt" Bowles	Episode: "Masquerade"
1960	The Ann Sothern Show	Billy Wilton	Episode: "Billy"
1960	Surfside 6	Willy	Episode: "The Clown"
1960–61	Lawman	Owny O'Reilly	3 episodes
1961	Westinghouse Playhouse	Herbie	Episode: "Nanette's Teenage Suitor"
1961	77 Sunset Strip	Joey Kellogg	Episode: "Open and Close in One"
1966	Vacation Playhouse	Freddy Rockefeller	Episode: "My Lucky Penny"
1968	What's My Line?	Himself / Mystery Guest	Episode: Season1 Episode 1
1971	Ironside	Mike Jaeger	Episode: "A Killing at the Track"
1972	Night Gallery	Andrew MacBane	Episode: "There Aren't Any More MacBanes"
1973	The $10,000 Pyramid	Himself / Celebrity Guest	Episode: "Peggy Cass vs. Joel Grey"
1974	The Carol Burnett Show	Gary	Segment: "Carol and Sis"
1976	The Muppet Show	Himself (guest)	Episode: "Joel Grey"
1981	Paddington	Himself	Host
1982	Alice	Himself	2 episodes
1987	Queenie	Aaron Diamond	2 episodes
1991	Matlock	Tommy DeLuca	Episode: "The Critic"
1991	Dallas	Adam	Episode: "Conundrum"
1992–93	Brooklyn Bridge	Jacob Prossman	2 episodes
1995	Star Trek: Voyager	Caylem	Episode: "Resistance"
1999, 2000	The Outer Limits	Dr. Neil Seward / Gideon Banks	2 episodes
2001	Buffy the Vampire Slayer	Doc	3 episodes
2001	Touched by an Angel	Ronald	2 episodes
2001	Further Tales of the City	Guido	3 episodes
2003	Oz	Lemuel Idzik	6 episodes
2003	Law & Order: Criminal Intent	Milton Winters	Episode: "Cuba Libre"
2005	Alias	Another Mr. Sloane	3 episodes
2005	Crossing Jordan	Carl Meisner	Episode: "Forget Me Not"
2006	House	Dr. Ezra Powell	Episode: "Informed Consent"
2007	Brothers & Sisters	Dr. Jude Bar-Shalom	Episode: "Love Is Difficult"
2008	Phineas and Ferb	Beppo (voice)	Episode: "The Monster of Phineas-n-Ferbenstein/Oil on Candace"
2009	Private Practice	Dr. Alexander Ball	Episode: "Nothing to Fear"
2009	Grey's Anatomy	Dr. Singer	Episode: "New History"
2012	Nurse Jackie	Dick Bobbitt	Episode: "Day of the Iguana"
2013	Warehouse 13	Monty The Magnificent	Episode: "The Sky's the Limit"
2014	CSI: Crime Scene Investigation	Hank Kasserman	Episode: "Keep Calm and Carry On"
2014	Park Bench with Steve Buscemi	Himself	Episode: "Benchmark"
2022–24	The Old Man	Morgan Bote	4 episodes

==== TV films and miniseries ====
Year	Title	Role	Notes
1958	Little Women	Theodore "Laurie" Laurence	
1970	George M!	George M. Cohan	
1972	Man on a String	Joe "Big Joe" Brown	
1974	'Twas the Night Before Christmas	Joshua Trundle (voice)	
1982	The Yeomen of the Guard	Jack Point	
1995	The Wizard of Oz in Concert: Dreams Come True	Narrator / The Wizard / Various Roles	
1999	A Christmas Carol	Ghost of Christmas Past	

=== Theater ===
Year	Title	Role	Venue	Notes
1951	Borscht Capades	Performer	Royale Theatre, Broadway	Credited as 'Joel Kaye'
1956	The Littlest Revue	Performer	Phoenix Theatre, Broadway	
1961	Come Blow Your Horn	Buddy Baker	Brooks Atkinson Theatre, Broadway	
1962	Stop the World – I Want to Get Off	Littlechap	Shubert Theatre, Broadway	
1965	Half a Sixpence	Arthur Kipps	Broadhurst Theatre, Broadway	
1966	Cabaret	Master of Ceremonies	Broadhurst Theatre, Broadway	
1968	George M!	George M. Cohan	Palace Theatre, Broadway	
1975	Goodtime Charley	Charles VII	Palace Theatre, Broadway	
1977	Marco Polo Sings a Solo	Stony McBride	The Public Theater, Off-Broadway	
1979	The Grand Tour	S.L. Jacobowsky	Palace Theatre, Broadway	
1985	The Normal Heart	Ned Weeks	The Public Theater, Off-Broadway	
1987	Cabaret	Master of Ceremonies	US tour	
1987	Cabaret	Master of Ceremonies	Imperial Theatre, Broadway	
1991	When We Dead Awaken	Performer	American Repertory Theater, Cambridge	
1995	The Wizard of Oz	Narrator / The Wizard of Oz / Various Roles	Lincoln Center	
1996	Chicago	Amos Hart	Richard Rodgers Theatre, Broadway	
1997	Chicago	Amos Hart	US tour	
1998	Chicago	Amos Hart	Shubert Theatre, Broadway	
1998	Chicago	Amos Hart	Adelphi Theatre, West End	
1999	Give Me Your Answer, Do!	Jack Donovan	Gramercy Theatre, Off-Broadway	
2003	Wicked	The Wizard of Oz	Gershwin Theatre, Broadway	
2011	Anything Goes	"Moonface" Martin	Stephen Sondheim Theatre, Broadway	
2011	The Normal Heart	—	John Golden Theatre, Broadway	Director
2016	The Cherry Orchard	Firs	American Airlines Theatre, Broadway	
2018	Fiddler on the Roof (Fidler Afn Dakh)	—	National Yiddish Theatre Folksbiene	Director; American premiere of the play in Yiddish

== Awards and honors ==
Year	Award	Category	Work	Result	Ref.
1972	Academy Awards	Best Supporting Actor	Cabaret	Won	
1972	British Academy Film Awards	Most Promising Newcomer to Leading Film Roles	Cabaret	Won	
1975	Drama Desk Awards	Outstanding Actor in a Musical	Goodtime Charley	Nominated	
1979	Drama Desk Awards	Outstanding Actor in a Musical	The Grand Tour	Nominated	
1988	Drama Desk Awards	Outstanding Actor in a Musical	Cabaret	Nominated	
1997	Drama Desk Awards	Outstanding Featured Actor in a Musical	Chicago	Won	
2000	Drama Desk Awards	Outstanding Featured Actor in a Play	Give Me Your Answer, Do!	Nominated	
2011	Drama Desk Awards	Outstanding Director of a Play	The Normal Heart	Won	
2019	Drama Desk Awards	Outstanding Director of a Musical	Fiddler on the Roof (Fidler Afn Dakh)	Nominated	
1972	Golden Globe Awards	Best Supporting Actor – Motion Picture	Cabaret	Won	
1985	Golden Globe Awards	Best Supporting Actor – Motion Picture	Remo Williams: The Adventure Begins	Nominated	
2012	Grammy Awards	Best Musical Theater Album	Anything Goes	Nominated	
1972	Kansas City Film Critics Circle Awards	Best Supporting Actor	Cabaret	Won	
1972	National Board of Review Awards	Best Supporting Actor	Cabaret	Won (Note: Tied with Al Pacino for The Godfather.)	
1972	National Society of Film Critics Awards	Best Supporting Actor	Cabaret	Won (Note: Tied with Eddie Albert for The Heartbreak Kid.)	
1993	Primetime Emmy Awards	Outstanding Guest Actor in a Comedy Series	Brooklyn Bridge	Nominated	
1985	Saturn Awards	Best Supporting Actor	Remo Williams: The Adventure Begins	Nominated	
1967	Tony Awards	Best Supporting or Featured Actor in a Musical	Cabaret	Won	
1969	Tony Awards	Best Leading Actor in a Musical	George M!	Nominated	
1975	Tony Awards	Best Leading Actor in a Musical	Goodtime Charley	Nominated	
1979	Tony Awards	Best Leading Actor in a Musical	The Grand Tour	Nominated	
2011	Tony Awards	Best Direction of a Play	The Normal Heart	Nominated	
2023	Tony Awards	Lifetime Achievement in Theatre Award		Received	

For his continued support of Broadway, Grey was named a Givenik Ambassador.

He was presented with a lifetime achievement award on June 10, 2013, by The National Yiddish Theatre – Folksbiene.

Grey won the Oscar Hammerstein Award for Lifetime Achievement in Musical Theatre on December 5, 2016, presented by the York Theatre Company in New York City. The theatre said, in part: "we are thrilled to celebrate the extraordinary Joel Grey, whose artistry — for over half a century — has become an indelible part of Broadway history."

Grey was honored as The New Jewish Home's Eight Over Eighty Gala 2015 honoree.

Grey was presented with the Teddy Kollek Award by the World Jewish Congress in November 2019.

== See also ==
- List of actors with Academy Award nominations
- List of actors nominated for Academy Awards for non-English performances
- List of LGBTQ Academy Award winners and nominees
- List of Golden Globe winners

== Sources ==
- Parrish, James Robert; Terrace, Vincent (1989). The Complete Actors' Television Credits, 1948–1988. Vol. 1. Scarecrow Press. p. 212. ISBN 978-0-8108-2204-7.
