= The Sorceress (play) =

1878 play by Abraham Goldfaden

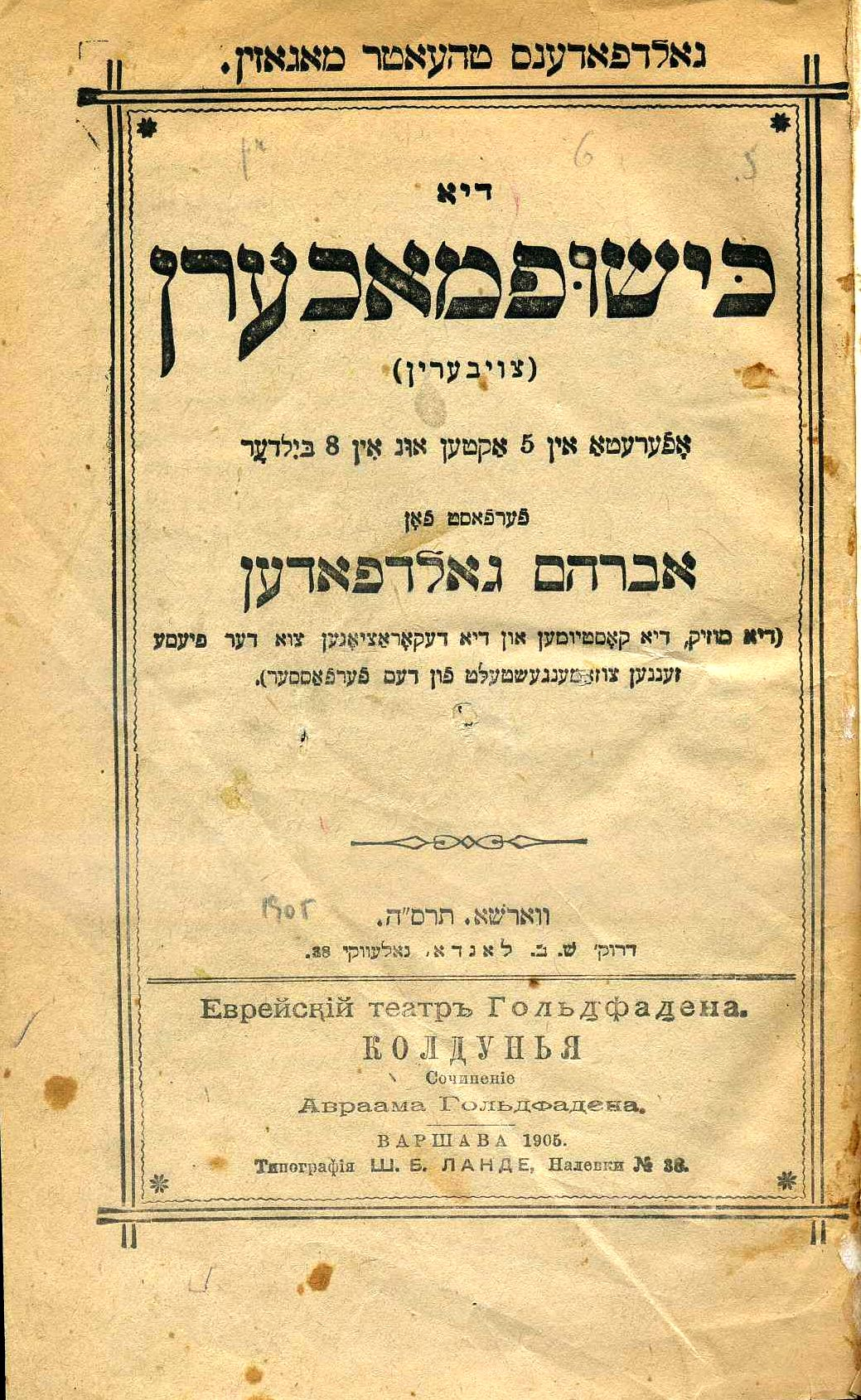
Title page of The Sorceress, 1905

The Witch of Botoşani or simply The Witch or The Sorceress (original Yiddish title Di kishefmakherin, tsoyberin; Yiddish: די כישוף-מאכערין, די צויבערין) was an 1878, or possibly 1877, play by Abraham Goldfaden. Like most of Goldfaden's major works, it included music.

It was staged under various titles, including "Di tsoyberin" [The Conjureress] "Koldunye" (Yiddish: קאלדוניא; borrowed from Russian 'Колдунья', 'witch'), "Di bobe Yakhne" (cf. Baba Yaga).

The play was based on popular superstition; Goldfaden would later remark, "I wrote Di kishefmakhern (The Witch) in Romania, where the populace – Jews as much as Romanians – believe strongly in witches." [Bercovici, 1998] The title role, a female character, was written to be played by a man; it was first played by Israel Grodner. The play survived into a far different era of Yiddish theater: Maurice Schwartz played it at New York City's Yiddish Art Theatre in 1925. [Adler, 1999, 107 (commentary)]

Jacob Adler made his 1878 stage debut in the role of the lover Marcus, in a production in Kherson, Ukraine, in which Israel Rosenberg played the title role. [Adler, 1999, 107]

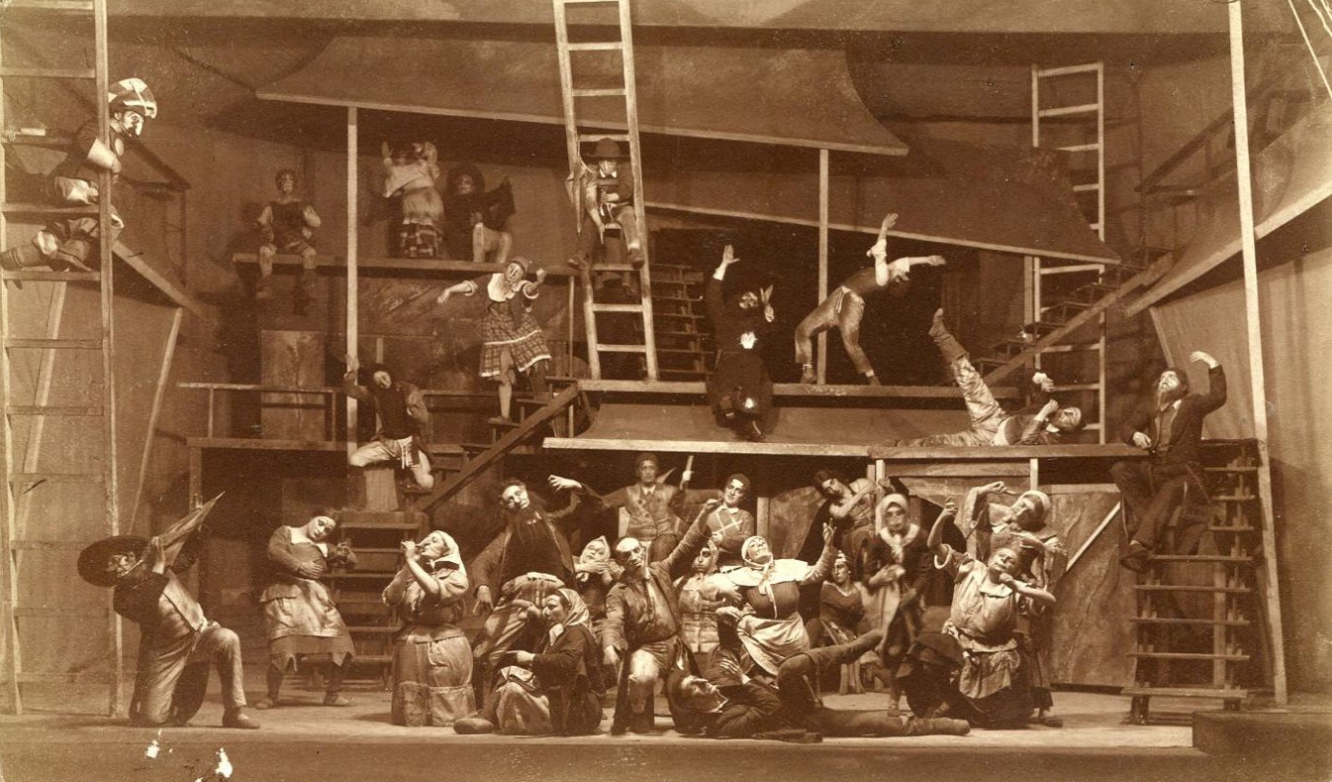
A scene from the 1922 GOSET staging of The Sorceress. Director: Solomon Mikhoels. Scene and costume design: Isaac Rabinovich

== Revival in the United States ==
In the Fall of 2017, the National Yiddish Theater – Folksbiene of New York staged a revival of The Witch of Botoșani (alternatively 'The Sorceress') as part of their restoration project – an endeavor that will restore lost or nearly lost Yiddish works to the canon of Yiddish culture. A table showing the dates and progress of that restoration effort is shown below.

Restoration Production Dates
Production	Produced by	Director	Music director	Event	Date
Workshop Performance	Folksbiene	Motl Didner	Zalmen Mlotek	First Performance	December 25, 2017
Workshop Performance	Folksbiene	Motl Didner	Zalmen Mlotek	Final Performance	January 1, 2018
Full Production	Folksbiene	Motl Didner	Zalmen Mlotek	Previews	December 1, 2019
Full Production	Folksbiene	Motl Didner	Zalmen Mlotek	Opening Night	December 9, 2019
Full Production	Folksbiene	Motl Didner	Zalmen Mlotek	Closing Night	December 29, 2019

=== Workshop performance ===
The first performance as part of the Folksbiene's restoration project ran for a sold out week from December 25, 2017, to January 1, 2018. Directed by Motl Didner, musically directed by Zalmen Mlotek the cast featured Michael (Mikhl) Yashinsky in the title role, Stephanie Lynne Mason, Pat Constant, Steve Sterner, Rachel Botchan, Chelsea Feltman, Kirk Geritano, Emily Hoolihan, Richard Lisenby, Riley McFarland, Raquel Nobile, Bruce Rebold, Gera Sandler, Kayleen Seidl, Lisa Stockman, Bobby Underwood, Tatiana Wechsler.

=== First full (restored) production ===
Two years later, in December 2019, the Folksbiene produced a full production of the restored work. Directed by Motl Didner, musically directed by Zalmen Mlotek, and choreographed by Merete Muenter the cast featured Michael (Mikhl) Yashinsky in the title role, Mark Alpert, Dani Apple, Rachel Botchan, Jonathan Brody, Rebecca Brudner, Samuel Druhora, Jazmin Gorsline, Peter Gosik, Josh Kohane, Sam Kronenfeld, Riley McFarland, Lexi Rabadi, Bruce Rebold, Hannah D. Scott, Dylan Seders Hoffman, Doug Shapiro, Steve Sterner, and Lorin Zackular.

Previews began on December 1, 2019, opening night was December 9, 2019, and closing performance was December 29, 2019.
