= Amerike the Golden Land =

- Original language: Yiddish and English
- Written by: Moishe Rosenfeld & Zalmen Mlotek
- Genre: Musical

Premiere
- Place: National Yiddish Theater Folksbiene

Amerike – The Golden Land is a musical with book, lyrics, and song by Moishe Rosenfeld and Zalmen Mlotek. The show is in Yiddish and English depicting the journey of Jewish immigrants to the United States.

Revisiting the archives of Yiddish theater, Amerike utilizes popular songs of the time period to tell the story of an immigrant people as they confront the challenges of living in early 20th-century New York City.

== Synopsis ==
Amerike – The Golden Land tells the journey of America's Jewish ancestors who emigrated from their towns and cities in Europe and Russia (especially the Pale of Settlement) to start a new life in America. The characters in this story start off with a tremendous amount of hope in leaving their homes and starting new lives in NYC. However, their notions of America as a free land are shattered at Ellis Island when they witness families being torn apart to Ellis Island's selection process. Life turns out to be quite difficult in America, the characters in the show soon discover. Poor wages, long hours, and sweatshop conditions are horrors that tug at the seams of the characters. Events such as the Triangle Factory fire, Workers Unionization, the Wall Street crash of 1929, the Great Depression, World War I, and The Holocaust – World War II are telling points of the story in showing these immigrants growth, participation, and contribution to American economy and culture. The story ends on a hopeful and spirited note where survivors of the Holocaust are welcomed into the United States by the immigrants who fought to create a life for themselves there. Told in popular songs of the day, Amerike – The Golden Land is performed in Yiddish with Russian and English supertitles.

== Productions ==
The musical was commissioned in 1982 by the Jewish Daily Forward on its 85th anniversary for The Workmen's Circle's national convention at the Stevensville Hotel in the Catskills. The commission was aimed at creating a story about the Forward's initial audience – the Jewish immigrants who came from Eastern Europe and Russia in the late 19th and 20th centuries.

Originally titled The Golden Land, the piece was first performed in June 1982 as a concert by Avi Hoffman, Eleanor Reissa, Phyllis Berk and Moishe Rosenfeld.

The piece was then developed to a full musical (still titled The Golden Land) over the next two years. A production at the American Music Theater Festival original musical based on Yiddish theater songs by Zalman Mlotek and Moishe Rosenfeld, directed by Jacques Levy (with Bruce Adler and the Golden Land Klezmer Band) moved to New York, largely intact, premiering Off-Broadway on October 28, 1985, for a 9-month run at the Second Avenue Theatre produced by Sherwin Goldman. It starred Bruce Adler, Avi Hoffman, Joanne Borts, Betty Silberman and Phyllis Berk.

In 1996, the Winnipeg Jewish Theater staged a version and in 2000, the Dora Wasserman Yiddish Theatre (part of the Segal Centre for Performing Arts) produced a fully Yiddish version in Montreal, directed by Bryna Wasserman.

In 2012, the NYTF presented The Golden Land at Baruch Performing Arts Center, again under the direction of Bryna Wasserman. Despite major setbacks and weeks of canceled show from the aftermath of Hurricane Sandy, the show emerged as a success, hailed as "a love letter to America" by the New York Times. The cast was made up of Daniella Rabbani, Cooper Grodin, Bob Ader, Sandy Rosenberg, Stacey Harris and Andrew Keltz.

The musical was soon after developed to an expanded version retitled Amerike the Golden Land (current title) and presented in 2017 as the National Yiddish Theater – Folksbiene's seasonal mainstage production at Museum of Jewish Heritage, again under the direction of Bryna Wasserman. The musical opened July 4, 2017 and performed for 6 weeks including a 2 weeks extension, closing August 20, 2017. The cast featured Glenn Seven Allen, Alexandra Frohlinger, Jessica Rose Futran, Daniel Kahn, Dani Marcus, Stephanie Lynne Mason, David Perlman, and Christopher Tefft. The chorus was made up of Maya Jacobson, Alexander Kosmowski, Isabel Nesti, Raquel Nobile, Grant Richards, and Bobby Underwood.

== Critical reception ==
The play received positive reviews. In her review for The New York Times, Maya Phillips wrote that "Amerike – The Golden Land dares to celebrate a cultural history in which America might help shape a people, and, more important, in which a people might help shape America." In her 3 out of 5-star review for Time Out NYC, Helen Shaw concluded that "Wasserman deftly directs the large, talented ensemble…they don’t disappoint."

Jonathan Mandell wrote, for New York Theatre, that "National Yiddish Theatre Folksbiene in its 103rd season is clearly trying for the Triple Crown …some dozen golden-voiced performers sing more than 40 beautiful Yiddish songs, backed by a klezmer-inflected eight-piece band, wonderfully orchestrated."
