= Jackie Hoffman =

American actress, singer, and comedian (born 1960)

- Hoffman in 2026
- Born: Jacqueline Laura Hoffman; November 29, 1960 (age 65); New York City, U.S.
- Occupations: Actress; singer; comedian
- Years active: 1992–present
- Spouse: Steve Smyth

Jacqueline Laura Hoffman (born November 29, 1960) is an American actress, singer, and comedian known for her one-woman shows of Jewish-themed original songs and monologues. She is a veteran of Chicago's famed The Second City comedy improv group.

Hoffman was nominated for a Primetime Emmy Award and a Critics' Choice Television Award for her role as Mamacita in the miniseries Feud (2017).

== Career ==
=== Stage ===
Hoffman won the Joseph Jefferson Award, Chicago's venerable theatre award, during her eight-year tenure with the Second City troupe. She starred in the following solo comedy performances: "If You Call This Living", "The Kvetching Continues", "Jackie Hoffman's Hanukkah", "A Chanukah Charol", "Jackie's Kosher Khristmas", and "Jackie's Valentine's Day Massacre", among others. Hoffman also joined the three-woman comic team behind "The J.A.P. Show, Jewish American Princesses of Comedy", at the Actors' Temple in April 2007.

She performed numerous roles in David and Amy Sedaris's 2001 comic play, The Book of Liz, winning an Obie Award. Her other theatrical credits include The Sisters Rosensweig, Straightjacket, Incident at Cobbler's Knob, and One Woman Shoe, for which she won a Jeff Award. In addition, she regularly performs at Joe's Pub in one-woman concerts.

In 2002, Hoffman was cast in the musical Hairspray on Broadway, playing the roles of Prudy Pingleton, Gym Teacher, Matron and Denizen of Baltimore. She won the 2003 Theatre World Award for her performance. She co-starred as Calliope, muse of epic poetry, in the rock musical Xanadu on Broadway, from July 2007 to September 2008. Hoffman starred as Grandmama in the Broadway musical The Addams Family, which opened at the Lunt-Fontanne Theatre on April 8, 2010, and closed on December 31, 2011. In 2010, she also parodied Lady Gaga's hit-single, Alejandro. She played Madame Dilly and other roles in the 2014 Broadway revival of On the Town until the show closed in September 2015. She played Mrs. Teavee in the Broadway production of Charlie and the Chocolate Factory, which opened on April 23, 2017, and closed January 14, 2018. In the summer of 2018, she joined the cast of the National Yiddish Theatre's production of Fidler Afn Dakh as Yente the matchmaker.

In 2020, Hoffman appeared as Nicky in the musical podcast, Propaganda!

=== Film and television ===
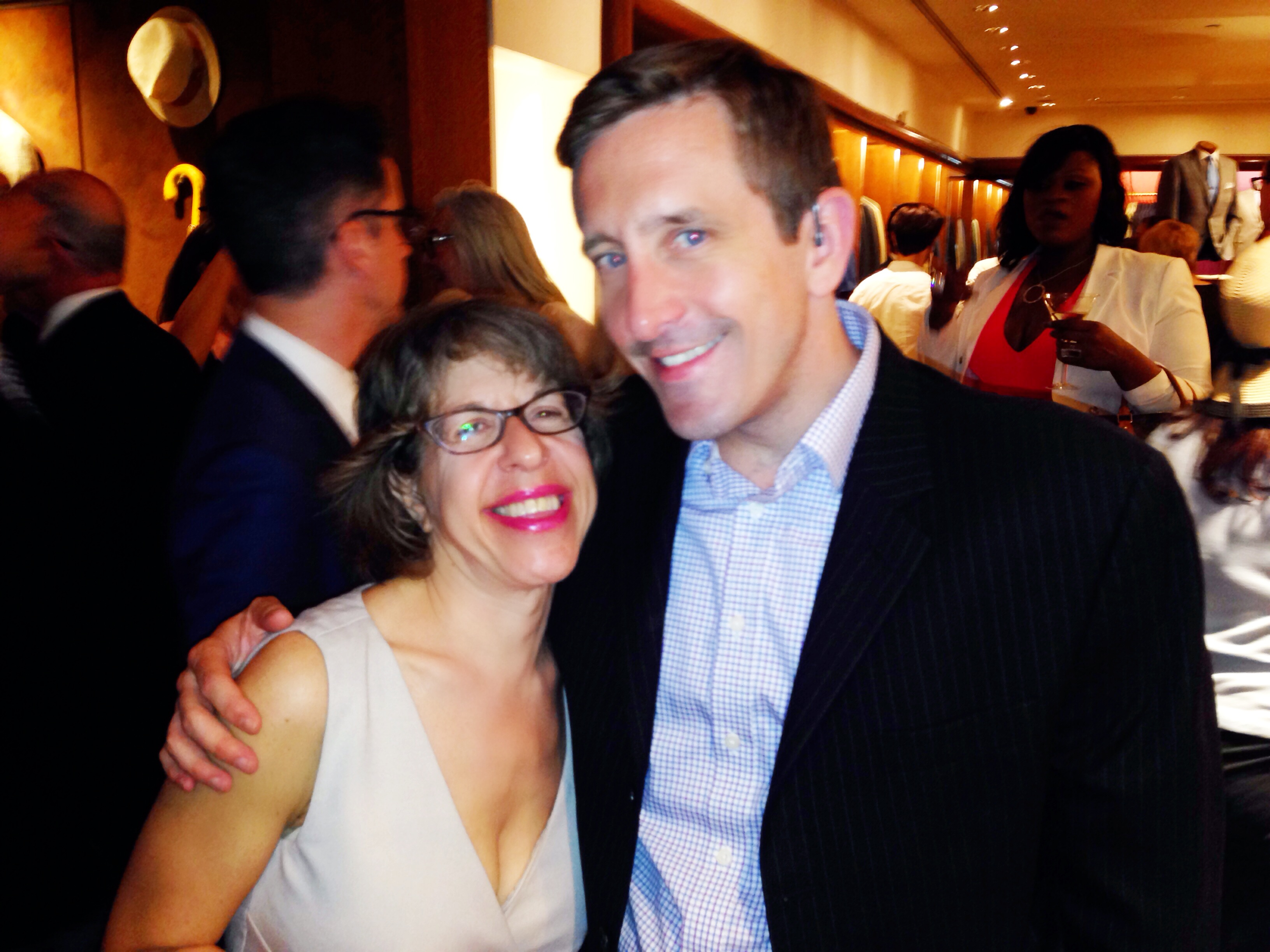
Hoffman at the Wall Street Journal's Tony Awards party with Brian Doherty of the AICP

Hoffman has acted in the movies Kissing Jessica Stein, Mo' Money, Garden State, Down, Queer Duck: The Movie, Legally Blonde 2: Red, White and Blonde, and A Dirty Shame, and was the voice of the Water Cooler in Robots.

In addition to cameoing on the television show Curb Your Enthusiasm, she has appeared in many series, including Difficult People, Strangers with Candy, Hope and Faith, Ed, Starved, Cosby, 30 Rock, One Life to Live, The Other Two, Gilmore Girls: A Year in the Life, and was the voice of Dilmom on Dilbert.

Hoffman provided the voice of "Mary Phillips, the Talk Radio host", in the video game Grand Theft Auto: San Andreas. Despite her frequent stage banter on her dislike of children, Hoffman did a surprising turn as the voices of the Gate to Fairy-tale Land and the Witch's Magic Wand in the Dora the Explorer movie, Dora's Fairytale Adventure. She has also been a frequent guest on Late Night with Conan O'Brien.

In 2007 she was featured in the film Making Trouble, a tribute to female Jewish comedians, produced by the Jewish Women's Archive. In 2011, Hoffman appeared as a cameo in The Sitter as Mrs. Sapperstein. In 2012, she has had a recurring role in The New Normal. She appeared in a cameo role in the Oscar-winning movie Birdman in 2014.

In 2017, she starred in the first season of the FX series entitled Feud: Bette and Joan in the role of Joan Crawford's housekeeper, Mamacita, for which she was nominated for the Primetime Emmy Award for Outstanding Supporting Actress in a Limited Series or Movie.

Since 2021, she has appeared in the Hulu series Only Murders in the Building as supporting character Uma Heller, an amusingly caustic neighbor of the show's principal characters.

In 2023, Hoffman portrayed the role of Assistant Principal McGee in the 10-episode Paramount+ series Grease: Rise of the Pink Ladies.

== Discography ==
Jackie Hoffman can be heard on the original Broadway cast recordings of Hairspray, Xanadu, The Addams Family, Charlie and the Chocolate Factory, the revival Broadway cast recording of On the Town, and the PS Classics' recording of Jackie Hoffman: Live at Joe's Pub released in Fall 2008. She also appears on Scott Alan's CD, Dreaming Wide Awake, in a duet with Carly Jibson.

== Personal life ==
Hoffman was born in Queens, New York. She is friends with Stephen Colbert and his wife Evelyn McGee-Colbert, jokingly making a scene when she did not catch Evelyn's bouquet at the couple's 1993 wedding.

At age 46, during the run of her show Regrets Only, she was hospitalized for a hysterectomy to remove a benign tumor. She was back in three weeks, with a cot backstage for whenever she was not singing or talking.

She is married to jazz trumpeter Steve Smyth.

== Stage credits ==
Year	Play	Role	Theatre
1995	One Woman Shoe	Jill	La Mama E.T.C., Off-Off-Broadway
1997	Incident at Cobbler's Knob	Squirrel	Lincoln Center Festival
2000	Straight Jacket	Jerry	Playhouse 91, Off-Broadway
2001	The Book of Liz	Sister Constance Butterworth et al.	Greenwich House Theater, Off-Broadway
2002–2004	Hairspray	Prudy Pingleton et al.	Neil Simon Theatre, Broadway
2006	The Sisters Rosensweig	Gorgeous Teitelbaum	Old Globe Theatre, Regional
2006–2007	Regrets Only	Myra Kesselman	New York City Center Stage I, Off-Broadway
2007–2008	Xanadu	Calliope/Aphrodite	Helen Hayes Theatre, Broadway
2009–2011	The Addams Family	Grandmama Eudora Addams	Oriental-Ford Center for the Arts, Chicago; Lunt-Fontanne Theatre, Broadway
2012	Chicago	Matron "Mama" Morton	The Muny, Regional
2014–2015	On the Town	Maude P. Dilly et al.	Lyric Theatre, Broadway
2015–2016	Once Upon a Mattress	Princess Winnifred	Abrons Arts Center, Off-Broadway
2017–2018	Charlie and the Chocolate Factory	Mrs. Teavee	Lunt-Fontanne Theatre, Broadway
2018–2020	Fidler Afn Dakh	Yente	Edmond J. Safra Hall/Stage 42, Off-Broadway
2021	Fairycakes	Moth	Greenwich House Theater, Off-Broadway
2022	The Tattooed Lady	Ida Gibson	Suzanne Roberts Theatre, Regional
2023	Gutenberg! The Musical!	The Producer	James Earl Jones Theatre, Broadway
2025	My First Ex-Husband	Monica/Gloria	MMC Theater, Off-Broadway

== Filmography ==
=== Film ===
Year	Film	Role
1992	Mo' Money	Jill
2001	Kissing Jessica Stein	Joan Levine
2001	The Shaft	Marie-Anne Holland
2003	Legally Blonde 2: Red, White & Blonde	Dog Spa Receptionist
2004	Garden State	Aunt Sylvia Largeman
2004	A Dirty Shame	Dora
2005	Robots	Water Cooler (voice)
2006	Queer Duck: The Movie	Lola Buzzard (voice)
2008	The Entrepreneurs	Janet
2009	How to Seduce Difficult Women	Book Publisher
2010	The Extra Man	Pushy Woman
2011	The Sitter	Mrs. Sapperstein
2014	Birdman	Mary
2014	5 Flights Up	"Eh" Lady
2015	Decay	Neighbor
2019	The Social Ones	Amanda
2020	Shiva Baby	Susan
2022	Glass Onion: A Knives Out Mystery	Ma Cody
2023	A Good Person	Belinda
2023	You Are So Not Invited to My Bat Mitzvah	Irene

=== Television ===
Year	Title	Role	Notes
1993	Flying Blind	Sales Clerk	Episode: "Unforgiving"
1995	Freaky Friday	Coach Tyser	TV movie
1996–1997	Doug	(voice)	26 episodes
1998	Soul Man	Rope Hoffman	Episode: "The Stan Plan"
1998–2001	PB&J Otter	Connie Crane (voice)	15 episodes
1999–2000	Dilbert	Dilmom (voice)	29 episodes
2000	Strangers with Candy	Ms. Plog	Episode: "A Price Too High for Riches"
2001	Ed	Cookie Mom #2	Episode: "The New World"
2003–2004	Dora the Explorer	Various voices	2 episodes
2004	Curb Your Enthusiasm	Rhonda	Episode: "Ben's Birthday Party"
2004	Hope & Faith	Bobbi	Episode: "Queer as Hope"
2005	Starved	Group Leader	5 episodes
2007	As the World Turns	Miranda	Episode #1.13124
2009	30 Rock	Rochelle Gaulke	Episode: "The Funcooker"
2009	One Life to Live	Eunice Burns	5 episodes
2012	Raising Hope	Sylvia Barnes	Episode: "I Want My Baby Back, Baby Back, Baby Back"
2012	Submissions Only	Auditioner #2	Episode: "Another Interruption"
2012	Melissa & Joey	Betty Mueller	Episode: "Wherefore Art Thou Lennox"
2012–2013	The New Normal	Frances	4 episodes
2013	Inside Amy Schumer	Psychic Medium	Episode: "Terrible People"
2013	The Good Wife	Judge Maria Felletti	Episode: "The Next Month"
2013	High School USA!	Tamar (voice)	2 episodes
2014	The Michael J. Fox Show	Pageant Coordinator	Episode: "Sochi"
2015	Girls	Shanaz Mensusen	Episode: "Tad & Loreen & Avi & Shanaz"
2015–2017	Difficult People	Rucchel Epstein	3 episodes
2016	American Dad!	Bird Cage Lady / City Councilwoman (voice)	Episode: "Roots"
2016	Elementary	Female Activist	Episode: "Up to Heaven and Down to Hell"
2016	Gilmore Girls: A Year in the Life	Esther	2 episodes
2017	Feud: Bette and Joan	Mamacita	8 episodes Primetime Emmy nominee for Outstanding Supporting Actress in a Limited Series or Movie
2017–2020	At Home with Amy Sedaris	Various	3 episodes
2019	The Other Two	Lorraine	Episode: "Chase Goes to a High School Dance"
2019–2020	The Politician	Sherry Dougal	6 episodes
2021	The Bite	Duchess Pavlona	2 episodes
2021–present	Only Murders in the Building	Uma Heller	18 episodes
2022	Search Party	Velma	Episode: "Kings"
2022	The Marvelous Mrs. Maisel	Gitta	3 episodes
2023	Grease: Rise of the Pink Ladies	Assistant Principal McGee	10 episodes
2024	Night Court	Linda	Episode: "Form Fetish"
2024	Spidey and His Amazing Friends	Aunt Petunia (voice)	Episode: "Hanukkah Heist"
2025	And Just Like That...	Local Baker	2 episodes
2025	Super Duper Bunny League	Greazy Granny (voice)	Episode: "Greazy Granny"
2026	Liam and Michael Presents: Cohan and Danny	Danny's Mother	1 episode
2026	The Loud House	Flo (voice)	Episode: "All Pets Are Off"
2026	Best Medicine	Carson MacLeish	season 2 episode 6 "Cant Stop the Healing"
