= Fidler Afn Dakh =

Fidler Afn Dakh (Fiddler on the Roof)
- Playbill from the Original Off-Broadway Production
- Music: Jerry Bock
- Lyrics: Sheldon Harnick (English lyrics); Shraga Friedman (Yiddish lyrics)
- Book: Joseph Stein (English book); Shraga Friedman (Yiddish book)
- Basis: Tevye and His Daughters by Sholem Aleichem
- Premiere: June 7, 1965: Alhambra Theatre, Israel
- Productions: 1965 Israel; 2018 Folksbiene; 2019 Off-Broadway; 2020 Sydney, Melbourne (both cancelled due to COVID-19); 2022 Off-Broadway Revival at New World Stages; 2025 Los Angeles concert; 2026 Toronto; 2027 Los Angeles
- Awards: Lucille Lortel Award for Outstanding Revival of a Broadway or Off-Broadway Musical; Drama Desk Award for Outstanding Revival of a Musical; Outer Critics Circle Award for Outstanding Revival of a Musical

Fidler Afn Dakh (פידלער אויפן דאך) is a Yiddish-language adaptation of the musical Fiddler on the Roof translated and adapted by Shraga Friedman. The adaptation revisits the 1894 collection of Yiddish short stories on which Fiddler on the Roof is based, about Tevye the Dairyman. Friedman created the translation for the 1965 Israeli production. It was produced by the National Yiddish Theatre Folksbiene (NYTF) in New York City in 2018 and transferred Off-Broadway to Stage 42 in 2019.

== Productions ==
=== Original production (Israel) ===
The first Yiddish-translated production opened on June 7, 1965, at the Alhambra Theatre in Tel Aviv.

The production was directed by Richard Altman and choreographed by Tom Abbott, with the production credited to Jerome Robbins.

A cast recording, published by Columbia Records, was released the same year.

=== North American premiere ===
The first North American production was produced by the NYTF at the Museum of Jewish Heritage in New York City, directed by Joel Grey, featuring musical staging and choreography by Staś Kmieć in the style of the original. Motl Didner and Sabina Brukner served as Yiddish coaches.

The production was accompanied by English and Russian supertitles.

The first preview was on July 4, 2018. Opening night was July 15, 2018. The show was scheduled to run for 6 weeks until August 26, 2018, but was extended three times, through the end of 2018, until it was transferred uptown to a commercial Off-Broadway theatre. (See below)

=== Off-Broadway commercial premiere ===
After 4 successful extensions, the Folksbiene's production was converted to a commercial run and transferred to Stage 42 by producers Hal Luftig and Jana Robbins in February 2019. The production featured new musical staging and choreography by Staś Kmieć set design by Beowulf Boritt, costumes by Ann Hould-Ward, sound by Dan Moses Schreier and lighting by Peter Kaczorowski. The production continued to be accompanied by English and Russian supertitles.

A cast recording was released digitally on August 9, 2019, and was released physically on August 23 that same year. The production was announced to close January 5, 2020.

=== Off-Broadway 2022 revival ===
On July 25, 2022, the NYTF announced a revival of the production featuring Steven Skybell returning as Tevye and Joel Grey as director. It ran from November 13, 2022, through January 1, 2023 at New World Stages.

=== Other productions ===
In August 2019 it was announced that the production would have its Australian premiere, to be staged by Opera Australia and the Gordon Frost Organisation. The Australian production was scheduled to open at the Sydney Opera House in September 2020, followed by a run in Melbourne at the Comedy Theatre in November. However, the COVID-19 pandemic resulted in the cancellation of both openings.

In September 2025, members of the cast reunited for a concert version of the musical for its west coast premiere at the Younes and Soraya Nazarian Center for the Performing Arts in Northridge, Los Angeles, California.

The production made its international debut at the Elgin Theatre in Toronto, Canada from May 25 through June 7, 2026, produced by the Harold Green Jewish Theatre Company. Skybell once again reprised his role as Tevye, this time joined by an all-Canadian cast.

== Casts ==
Role	Original Production (Israel, 1965)	North American Premiere (National Yiddish Theater Folksbiene, 2018)	Off-Broadway (Stage 42, 2019)	Off-Broadway Revival (New World Stages, 2022)	Toronto (Harold Green Jewish Theatre, 2026)	Los Angeles
Tevye	Shmuel Rodensky	Steven Skybell	Steven Skybell	Steven Skybell	Steven Skybell	Steven Skybell
Golde	Lya Dulitzkaya	Jennifer Babiak	Jennifer Babiak	Jennifer Babiak	Tracy Michailidis	
Tsaytl	Atalia Cahana	Rachel Zatcoff	Rachel Zatcoff	Rachel Zatcoff	Isidora Kecman	
Hodl	Etty Grottes	Stephanie Lynne Mason	Stephanie Lynne Mason	Stephanie Lynne Mason	Emma Burke-Kleinman	
Khava	Tirza Arbel	Rosie Jo Neddy	Rosie Jo Neddy	Rosie Jo Neddy	Alice Malakhov	
Yente	Alina Stranitska	Jackie Hoffman	Jackie Hoffman	Lisa Fishman	Theresa Tova	Jackie Hoffman
Motl Kamzoyl	Albert Cohen	Ben Liebert	Ben Liebert	Ben Liebert	Joshua Kilimnik	
Pertshik		Daniel Kahn	Drew Seigla	Drew Seigla	Sayer Roberts	
Fyedka		Cameron Johnson	Cameron Johnson	Michael Nigro	Nick Boegel	
Lazar-Volf	Chaim Polani	Bruce Sabath	Bruce Sabath	Bruce Sabath	George Masswohl	
Constable (Der Gradavoy) (Note: "Gradavoy" is Yiddish for Russian "городовой", gorodovoy)		Bobby Underwood	Bobby Underwood	Bobby Underwood	Igor Portnoi	
Bobe Tsaytl	Hannah Binyamini	Mary Illes	Lisa Fishman	Lisa Fishman	Michelle Heisler	
Frume-Sore	Zafrira Yaroni	Jodi Snyder	Jodi Snyder	Jodi Snyder	Gabi Epstein	
Sheyndl/Mirele		Joanne Borts	Joanne Borts		Amy Rivard	
Chaim		Josh Dunn		Jonathan Quigley	Eric Dahlinger	
Avram		Kirk Geritano	Kirk Geritano	Kirk Geritano	Jeremy Lapalme	
Mordcha	Joseph Hazan	Mikhl Yashinsky	Mikhl Yashinsky	Mikhl Yashinsky	Jamie Elman	
Beylke		Samantha Hahn	Samantha Hahn	Jodi Snyder	Lily Schnoor	
Sasha		Evan Mayer	Evan Mayer	Jonathan Cable	Joey Arrigo	
Shprintze		Raquel Nobile	Raquel Nobile	Raquel Nobile	Romi Shraiter	
Yosl		Nick Raynor	Nick Raynor	Nick Raynor	Teddy Moynihan	
Der Rov		Adam B. Shapiro	Adam B. Shapiro	Adam B. Shapiro	Ralph Small	
Mendl	Yakar Zemach	James Monroe Števko	James Monroe Števko	James Monroe Števko	Preston Vendramin	
Der Fidler	Yaacov Maman	Lauren Jeanne Thomas	Lauren Jeanne Thomas	Lauren Jeanne Thomas	Connor J. Lucas	

== Awards ==
The production won the 2019 Drama Desk Award for Outstanding Revival of a Musical, the Outer Critics Circle Award for Outstanding Revival of a Musical, and the New York Critics Circle citation for Best Revival of a Musical.
