= Jud Newborn =

American cultural anthropologist

Jud Newborn (born in 1952), is a New York-based author, lecturer, cultural anthropologist and curator. A pioneer in the creation of Holocaust museums, he helped build New York's Museum of Jewish Heritage, serving as its Founding Historian and curator. He is known for his co-authored book, Sophie Scholl and the White Rose, an account of the history of the White Rose, a group formed in part by German Christian students, some former Hitler Youth fanatics, who were part of the German anti-Nazi resistance.

== Background ==
Newborn is also a wide-ranging lecturer who has spoken throughout North America and worldwide. He is known for dramatic multimedia programs that set unsung aspects of the Holocaust, among other subjects, within the context of such compelling, contemporary issues as the rise of extremism, oppression, fanaticism and genocide, in order to inspire audiences to join in the fight for freedom and "our shared humanity."

Newborn's involvement with the holocaust began at age 5 when he discovered a sepia family photograph that his grandmother had hidden away. When he brought it to her and asked who the people in it were, "her face turned bright red. Tears welled in her eyes. And she said in her Yiddish accent, 'Dunt ask me. Hitler burnt dem all.'"

Jud Newborn was educated at New York University, Cambridge University and the University of Chicago, which awarded him his doctorate with Distinction in 1994 for his dissertation, "Work Makes Free": The Hidden Cultural Meanings of the Holocaust; (Work Makes Free: English translation of Nazi forced labor camp slogan Arbeit Macht Frei).
