= Drama Desk Award for Outstanding Revival of a Musical =

American theatre award

Drama Desk Award for Outstanding Revival
- Awarded for: Outstanding Revival of a Musical
- Location: New York City
- Country: United States
- Presented by: Drama Desk
- First award: 1994
- Currently held by: Ragtime (2026)
- Website: dramadesk.org (defunct)

The Drama Desk Award for Outstanding Revival of a Musical is an annual award presented by Drama Desk in recognition of achievements in the theatre across collective Broadway, off-Broadway and off-off-Broadway productions in New York City. The award was first presented at the 1994 ceremony, after Drama Desk retired the Outstanding Revival category (1955–1992), a singular award covering achievement by either a play or a musical production. The accompanying Drama Desk Award for Outstanding Revival of a Play was also created, though it was first presented at the 1993 ceremony.

She Loves Me, The King and I, La Cage aux Folles and Company are the only shows to win the award more than once, with two wins each. Meanwhile, Into the Woods, Gypsy, Fiddler on the Roof and Sweeney Todd: The Demon Barber of Fleet Street each hold the record for most nominations, with three each.

== Winners and nominees ==
Key

and bold indicates the winner.

=== 1990s ===
Year	Musical	Book	Music	Lyrics	Ref.
1994
1994	**She Loves Me**	**Joe Masteroff**	**Jerry Bock**	**Sheldon Harnick**	
1994	Carousel	Oscar Hammerstein II	Richard Rodgers	Oscar Hammerstein II	
1994	Damn Yankees	George Abbott and Douglass Wallop	Richard Adler	Jerry Ross	
1994	My Fair Lady	Alan Jay Lerner	Frederick Loewe	Alan Jay Lerner	
1995	—N/a				
1996
1996	**The King and I**	**Oscar Hammerstein II**	**Richard Rodgers**	**Oscar Hammerstein II**	
1996	A Funny Thing Happened on the Way to the Forum	Burt Shevelove and Larry Gelbart	Stephen Sondheim		
1996	I Do! I Do!	Tom Jones	Harvey Schmidt	Tom Jones	
1997
1997	**Chicago**	**Fred Ebb and Bob Fosse**	**John Kander**	**Fred Ebb**	
1997	Candide	Lillian Hellman and Hugh Wheeler	Leonard Bernstein	Various	
1997	Juan Darién	—N/a	Elliot Goldenthal		
1998
1998	**Cabaret**	**Joe Masteroff**	**John Kander**	**Fred Ebb**	
1998	1776	Peter Stone	Sherman Edwards		
1999
1999	**You're a Good Man, Charlie Brown**	**John Gordon**	**Clark Gesner**		
1999	Annie Get Your Gun	Herbert and Dorothy Fields	Irving Berlin		

=== 2000s ===
Year	Musical	Book	Music	Lyrics	Ref.
2000
2000	**Kiss Me, Kate**	**Samuel and Bella Spewack**	**Cole Porter**		
2000	The Music Man	Meredith Willson and Franklin Lacey	Meredith Willson		
2001
2001	**42nd Street**	**Michael Stewart and Mark Bramble**	**Harry Warren**	**Al Dubin**	
2001	Bells Are Ringing	Betty Comden and Adolph Green	Jule Styne	Betty Comden and Adolph Green	
2001	Follies	James Goldman	Stephen Sondheim		
2001	The Rocky Horror Show	Richard O'Brien			
2002
2002	**Into the Woods**	**James Lapine**	**Stephen Sondheim**		
2002	Oklahoma!	Oscar Hammerstein II	Richard Rodgers	Oscar Hammerstein II	
2003
2003	**Nine**	**Arthur Kopit**	**Maury Yeston**		
2003	Gypsy	Arthur Laurents	Jule Styne	Stephen Sondheim	
2003	La bohème	Luigi Illica and Giuseppe Giacosa	Giacomo Puccini	Luigi Illica and Giuseppe Giacosa	
2003	Man of La Mancha	Dale Wasserman	Mitch Leigh	Joe Darion	
2004
2004	**Assassins**	**John Weidman**	**Stephen Sondheim**		
2004	Big River	William Hauptman	Roger Miller		
2004	Fiddler on the Roof	Joseph Stein	Jerry Bock	Sheldon Harnick	
2004	Finian's Rainbow	E.Y. Harburg and Fred Saidy	Burton Lane	E.Y. Harburg	
2004	First Lady Suite	Michael John LaChiusa			
2004	Wonderful Town	Joseph A. Fields and Jerome Chodorov	Leonard Bernstein	Betty Comden and Adolph Green	
2005
2005	**La Cage aux Folles**	**Harvey Fierstein**	**Jerry Herman**		
2005	Ain't Supposed to Die a Natural Death	Melvin Van Peebles			
2005	On Second Avenue	—N/a	Various		
2005	Sweet Charity	Neil Simon	Cy Coleman	Dorothy Fields	
2006
2006	**Sweeney Todd: The Demon Barber of Fleet Street**	**Hugh Wheeler**	**Stephen Sondheim**		
2006	Jacques Brel is Alive and Well and Living in Paris	Eric Blau and Mort Shuman	Jacques Brel	Jacques Brel, Eric Blau and Mort Shuman	
2006	The Pajama Game	George Abbott and Richard Bissell	Richard Adler and Jerry Ross		
2007
2007	**Company**	**George Furth**	**Stephen Sondheim**		
2007	110 in the Shade	N. Richard Nash	Harvey Schmidt	Tom Jones	
2007	The Apple Tree	Jerry Bock and Sheldon Harnick	Jerry Bock	Sheldon Harnick	
2007	Di Yam Gazlonim!	W. S. Gilbert	Arthur Sullivan	W. S. Gilbert	
2007	H.M.S. Pinafore	W. S. Gilbert	Arthur Sullivan	W. S. Gilbert	
2007	Les Misérables	Claude-Michel Schönberg and Alain Boublil	Claude-Michel Schönberg	Herbert Kretzmer	
2008
2008	**South Pacific**	**Oscar Hammerstein II and Joshua Logan**	**Richard Rodgers**	**Oscar Hammerstein II**	
2008	Black Nativity	Langston Hughes	Various		
2008	Gypsy	Arthur Laurents	Jule Styne	Stephen Sondheim	
2008	Sunday in the Park with George	James Lapine	Stephen Sondheim		
2008	Take Me Along	Joseph Stein and Robert Russell	Bob Merrill		
2009
2009	**Hair**	**James Rado and Gerome Ragni**	**Galt MacDermot**	**James Rado and Gerome Ragni**	
2009	Pal Joey	John O'Hara	Richard Rodgers	Lorenz Hart	
2009	West Side Story	Arthur Laurents	Leonard Bernstein	Stephen Sondheim	

=== 2010s ===
Year	Musical	Book	Music	Lyrics	Ref.
2010
2010	**La Cage aux Folles**	**Harvey Fierstein**	**Jerry Herman**		
2010	A Little Night Music	Hugh Wheeler	Stephen Sondheim		
2010	Finian's Rainbow	E.Y. Harburg and Fred Saidy	Burton Lane	E.Y. Harburg	
2010	Promises, Promises	Neil Simon	Burt Bacharach	Hal David	
2010	Ragtime	Terrence McNally	Stephen Flaherty	Lynn Ahrens	
2011
2011	**Anything Goes**	**Guy Bolton and P.G. Wodehouse**	**Cole Porter**		
2011	Hello Again	Michael John LaChiusa			
2011	How to Succeed in Business Without; Really Trying	Abe Burrows, Jack Weinstock and Willie Gilbert	Frank Loesser		
2012
2012	**Follies**	**James Goldman**	**Stephen Sondheim**		
2012	Carrie	Lawrence D. Cohen	Michael Gore	Dean Pitchford	
2012	Evita	Tim Rice	Andrew Lloyd Webber	Tim Rice	
2012	Jesus Christ Superstar	Tim Rice	Andrew Lloyd Webber	Tim Rice	
2012	Porgy and Bess	DuBose Heyward	George Gershwin	DuBose Heyward and Ira Gershwin	
2012	The Threepenny Opera	Bertolt Brecht	Kurt Weill	Bertolt Brecht	
2013
2013	**Pippin**	**Roger O. Hirson**	**Stephen Schwartz**		
2013	The Golden Land	Zalmen Mlotek and Moishe Rosenfeld			
2013	The Mystery of Edwin Drood	Rupert Holmes			
2013	Passion	James Lapine	Stephen Sondheim		
2013	Rodgers + Hammerstein's Cinderella	Oscar Hammerstein II and Douglas Carter Beane	Richard Rodgers	Oscar Hammerstein II	
2013	Working	Stephen Schwartz and Nina Faso	Various		
2014
2014	**Hedwig and the Angry Inch**	**John Cameron Mitchell**	**Stephen Trask**		
2014	Les Misérables	Claude-Michel Schönberg and Alain Boublil	Claude-Michel Schönberg	Herbert Kretzmer	
2014	Violet	Brian Crawley	Jeanine Tesori	Brian Crawley	
2015
2015	**The King and I**	**Oscar Hammerstein II**	**Richard Rodgers**	**Oscar Hammerstein II**	
2015	Into the Woods	James Lapine	Stephen Sondheim		
2015	On the Town	Betty Comden and Adolph Green	Leonard Bernstein	Betty Comden and Adolph Green	
2015	On the Twentieth Century	Betty Comden and Adolph Green	Cy Coleman	Betty Comden and Adolph Green	
2015	Pageant	Bill Russell and Frank Kelly	Albert Evans	Bill Russell and Frank Kelly	
2015	Side Show	Bill Russell	Henry Krieger	Bill Russell	
2016
2016	**She Loves Me**	**Joe Masteroff**	**Jerry Bock**	**Sheldon Harnick**	
2016	The Color Purple	Marsha Norman	Brenda Russell, Allee Willis and Stephen Bray		
2016	The Golden Bride	Frieda Freiman	Joseph Rumshinsky	Louis Gilrod	
2016	Fiddler on the Roof	Joseph Stein	Jerry Bock	Sheldon Harnick	
2016	Spring Awakening	Steven Sater	Duncan Sheik	Steven Sater	
2017
2017	**Hello, Dolly!**	**Michael Stewart**	**Jerry Herman**		
2017	Falsettos	James Lapine and William Finn	William Finn		
2017	Sweeney Todd: The Demon Barber of Fleet Street	Hugh Wheeler	Stephen Sondheim		
2017	Sweet Charity	Neil Simon	Cy Coleman	Dorothy Fields	
2017	Tick, Tick... Boom!	Jonathan Larson and David Auburn	Jonathan Larson		
2018
2018	**My Fair Lady**	**Alan Jay Lerner**	**Frederick Loewe**	**Alan Jay Lerner**	
2018	Amerike – The Golden Land	Moishe Rosenfeld and Zalmen Mlotek			
2018	Carousel	Oscar Hammerstein II	Richard Rodgers	Oscar Hammerstein II	
2018	Once On This Island	Lynn Ahrens	Stephen Flaherty	Lynn Ahrens	
2018	Pacific Overtures	John Weidman	Stephen Sondheim		
2019
2019	**Fiddler on the Roof (Fidler Afn Dakh)**	**Joseph Stein**	**Jerry Bock**	**Sheldon Harnick**	
2019	Carmen Jones	Oscar Hammerstein II	Georges Bizet	Oscar Hammerstein II	
2019	Kiss Me, Kate	Bella and Samuel Spewack	Cole Porter		
2019	Merrily We Roll Along	George Furth	Stephen Sondheim		
2019	Rodgers & Hammerstein's Oklahoma!	Oscar Hammerstein II	Richard Rodgers	Oscar Hammerstein II	

=== 2020s ===
Year	Musical	Book	Music	Lyrics	Ref.
2020
2020	**Little Shop of Horrors**	**Howard Ashman**	**Alan Menken**	**Howard Ashman**	
2020	The Unsinkable Molly Brown	Richard Morris	Meredith Willson		
2020	West Side Story	Arthur Laurents	Leonard Bernstein	Stephen Sondheim	
2021	No awards: New York theatres shuttered, March 2020 to September 2021, due to the COVID-19 pandemic in New York City				
2022
2022	**Company**	**George Furth**	**Stephen Sondheim**		
2022	Assassins	John Weidman	Stephen Sondheim		
2022	Baby	Sybille Pearson	David Shire	Richard Maltby Jr.	
2022	Caroline, or Change	Tony Kushner	Jeanine Tesori	Tony Kushner	
2023
2023	**Parade**	**Alfred Uhry**	**Jason Robert Brown**		
2023	A Man of No Importance	Terrence McNally	Stephen Flaherty	Lynn Ahrens	
2023	Into the Woods	James Lapine	Stephen Sondheim		
2023	Merrily We Roll Along	George Furth	Stephen Sondheim		
2023	Sweeney Todd: The Demon Barber of Fleet Street	Hugh Wheeler	Stephen Sondheim		
2024	**I Can Get It for You Wholesale**	**Jerome Weidman**	**Harold Rome**		
2024	Cabaret at the Kit Kat Club	Joe Masteroff	John Kander	Fred Ebb	
2024	Gutenberg! The Musical!	Scott Brown and Anthony King			
2025
2025	**Gypsy**	Arthur Laurents	Jule Styne	Stephen Sondheim	
2025	Cats: "The Jellicle Ball	T. S. Eliot	Andrew Lloyd Webber	T. S. Eliot, Trevor Nunn, and Richard Stilgoe	
2025	Floyd Collins	Tina Landau	Adam Guettel		
2025	Once Upon a Mattress	Jay Thompson, Marshall Barer, Dean Fuller, and Amy Sherman-Palladino	Mary Rodgers	Marshall Barer	
2025	See What I Wanna See	Michael John LaChiusa			
2025	Sunset Blvd.	Don Black and Christopher Hampton	Andrew Lloyd Webber	Don Black and Christopher Hampton	
2026
2026	**Ragtime**	**Terrence McNally**	**Stephen Flaherty**	**Lynn Ahrens**	
2026	Chess	Danny Strong	Benny Andersson and Björn Ulvaeus	Tim Rice	
2026	Amahl and the Night Visitors	Gian Carlo Menotti			
2026	The 25th Annual Putnam County Spelling Bee	Rachel Sheinkin	William Finn		
2026	The Baker's Wife	Joseph Stein	Stephen Schwartz		
2026	The Rocky Horror Show	Richard O'Brien			

== Shows with multiple wins ==
2 wins

- She Loves Me
- The King and I
- La Cage aux Folles
- Company

== Shows with multiple nominations ==
3 nominations

- Into the Woods
- Gypsy
- Fiddler on the Roof
- Sweeney Todd: The Demon Barber of Fleet Street

2 nominations

- She Loves Me
- Carousel
- My Fair Lady
- The King and I
- Cabaret
- Kiss Me, Kate
- Follies
- Oklahoma!
- Assassins
- Finian's Rainbow
- La Cage aux Folles
- Sweet Charity
- Company
- Les Misérables
- West Side Story
- Merrily We Roll Along

== See also ==
- Laurence Olivier Award for Best Musical Revival
- Tony Award for Best Revival of a Musical
