= Museum of Jewish Heritage =

Museum in Manhattan, New York

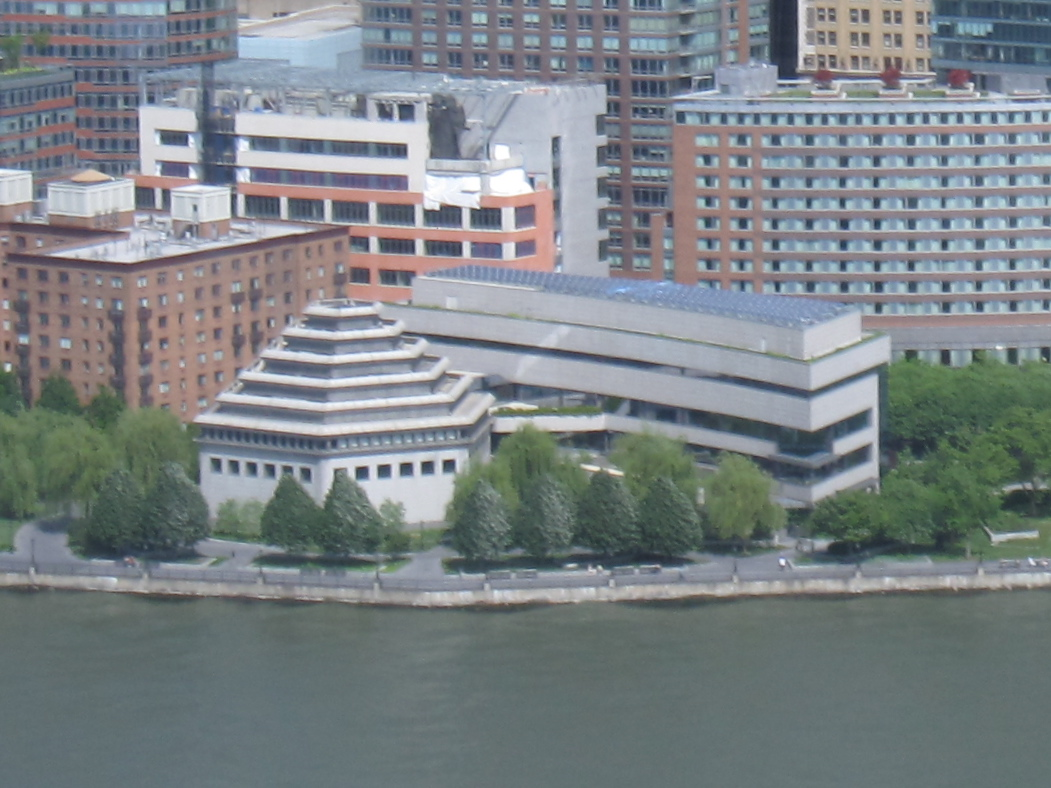
- Aerial view of the Museum of Jewish Heritage
- Established: 1997
- Location: Edmond J. Safra Plaza, 36 Battery Place, New York, NY, 10280
- Coordinates: 40.70621°N 74.01875°W
- Type: Holocaust/Jewish museum
- Directors: Jack Kliger, President & CEO
- Architect: Roche-Dinkeloo
- Public transit access: Bus: M15, M15 SBS, M20, M55 to South Ferry, M9 to Battery Park City; Subway: trains at Bowling Green trains at South Ferry/Whitehall Street
- Website: mjhnyc.org

The Museum of Jewish Heritage, located on Edmond J. Safra Plaza in the Battery Park City neighborhood of Manhattan, New York City, is a historical museum and a memorial to those murdered in The Holocaust. The museum has received more than two million visitors since opening in 1997. The mission statement of the museum is "to educate people of all ages and backgrounds about the broad tapestry of Jewish life in the 20th and 21st centuries—before, during, and after the Holocaust."

The museum's building includes two wings: a six-sided building with a pyramid-shaped roof designed to evoke the memory of the six million Jews killed in the Holocaust, and the Robert M. Morgenthau Wing. The six-sided building, opened in 1997, contains the museum's core exhibition galleries. The Morgenthau Wing, opened in 2003, contains the museum's offices, theater, and classrooms, as well as the Irving Schneider and Family exhibition gallery. Both wings were designed by Roche-Dinkeloo.

== History ==
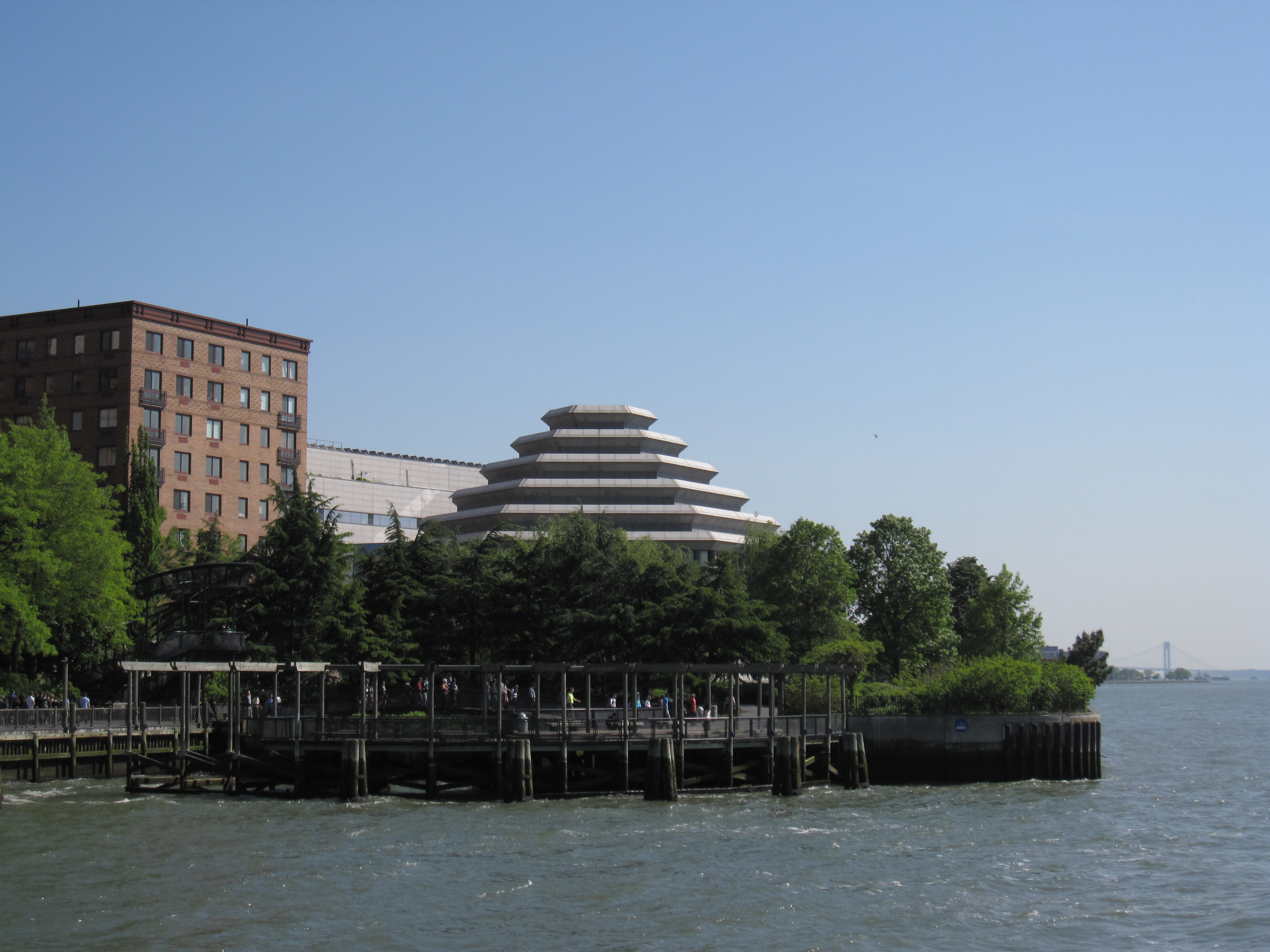
The pagoda-like structure of the museum

The Museum of Jewish Heritage was incorporated and chartered in 1984, dedicated in 1986, and built between 1994 and 1997 in New York City's Battery Park City. The museum's $21.5 million building, designed by architect Kevin Roche opened to the public on September 15, 1997. David Altshuler was the founding director of the museum, a position he held from 1984 until December 1999, when he left to become president of the Trust for Jewish Philanthropy. Dr. Jud Newborn (PhD, University of Chicago) served as the museum's founding historian from 1986 to 2000, recruited to use his expertise as a sociocultural anthropologist and Holocaust historian to help shape the parameters and content of the museum's core exhibition as well as seek and interpret artifacts.

Between 1946 and the 1960s, government officials lacked interest in building the museum until the American Jewish Community expressed interest and made an intervention for the museum creation; the American Jewish Community's interest was catalyzed by the Six-Day War in 1967. The intervention also contributed to the building process delay.

U.S. President Jimmy Carter, with the support of Mayor Ed Koch, proposed placing the national memorial in New York City instead of Washington, D.C., but it was ruled out. Koch's appointment of a Task Force on the Holocaust in 1981 was crucial. The Task Force, "which evolved in 1982 to the New York Holocaust Commission," recommended the creation of a museum. Carter, in 1978, created the President's Commission which placed the issue on the US government's agenda. The agenda remained present until it became a reality in President Bill Clinton's term on 1993.

Before the museum became a realization, there were crises in the economy and various political events that slowed down the museum creation. Political events included debates based on the structure, location, and even other priorities such as a funding crisis. One of the co-chairman wanted to "personalize" the museum building. The museum's site, originally proposed to be located within the Alexander Hamilton U.S. Custom House, was relocated to Battery Park City in 1986. The funding crisis was when "Black Monday", which occurred on October 19, 1987, "wiped out" funds of potential donors for the museum as well as dropped real estate prices.

Initially, Koch's administration and co-chairmen George Klein were going to obtain the Custom House for the museum. In 1985 Governor Mario Cuomo's broker negotiated site change to Battery Park City. Klein and other leaders were enthusiastic about the change since they wanted to create the best museum for the least price. Many plans for the Museum of Jewish Heritage was submitted but they were rejected by City's planning authorities.

In 1990, the museum merged with the Center for Holocaust Studies in Brooklyn. Architect Kevin Roche begin designing the museum in 1993. In the same year, Howard J. Rubinstein also joined the museum's board.

The New York City Holocaust Memorial Commission, established in 1982, was reincorporated in 1986 as the New York Holocaust Memorial Commission, with Governor Cuomo and Mayor Koch, as well as Klein, Robert M. Morgenthau and Manfred Ohrenstein and Peter Cohen as chairmen of its board.

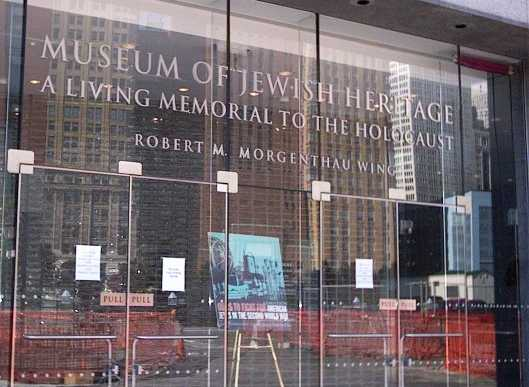
The museum's Robert M. Morgenthau wing

The final, approved plans were brought to fruition in 1997 with the museum's opening with David Altshuler as Executive Director. David Marwell replaced David Altshuler as Executive Director in 2000, and guided its subsequent expansion. In 2003, the dedication of the Robert M. Morgenthau wing included auditoria, classrooms, conference center, and a temporary exhibition space.

At an event held at the Museum of Jewish Heritage on January 29, 2017, Elisha Wiesel suggested that protesting against Executive Order 13769 ("Protecting the Nation from Foreign Terrorist Entry into the United States") was part of his father Elie Wiesel's legacy.

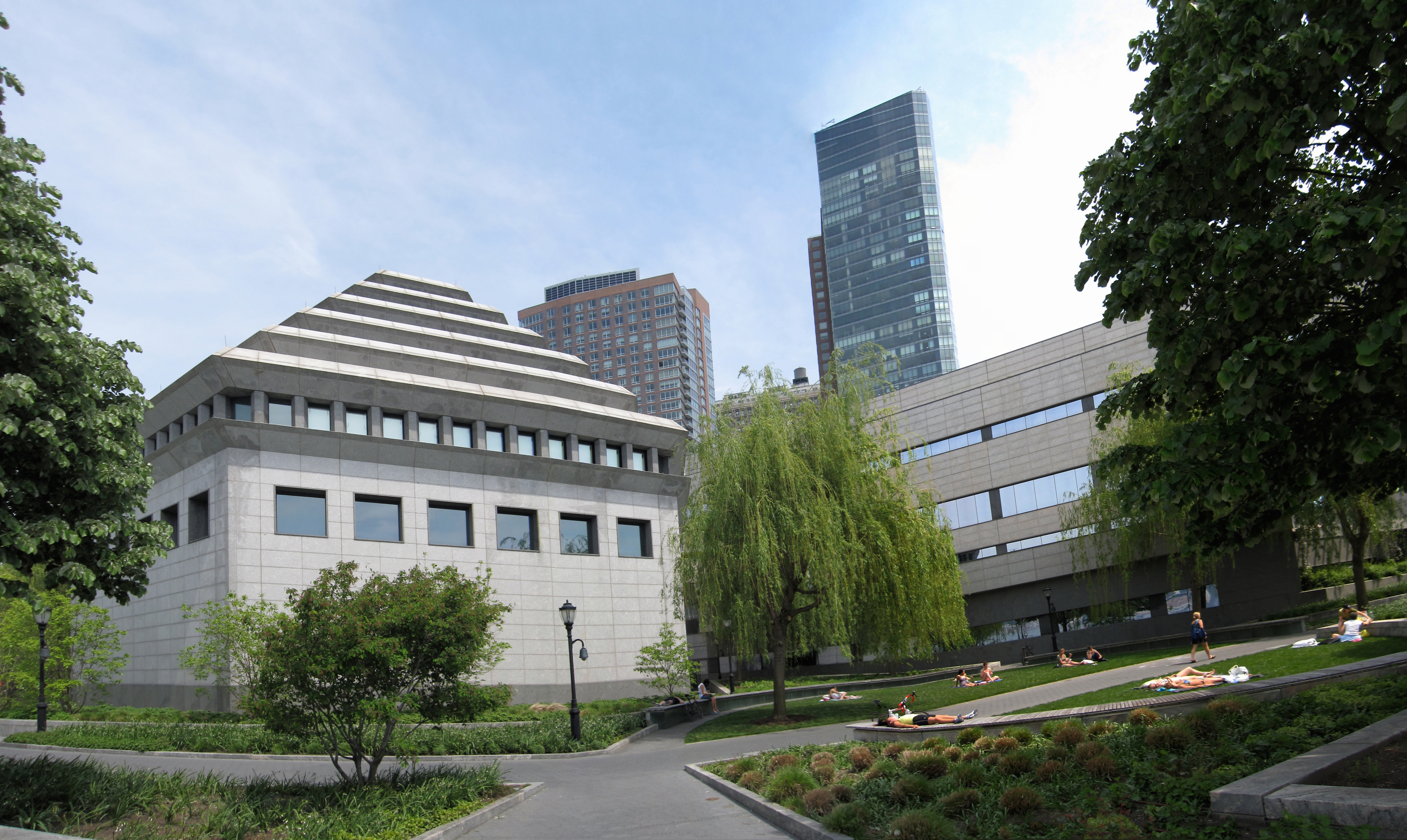
Outside view of the museum

From 1997 until 2019, the museum had a Core Exhibition which told the story of 20th and 21st century Jewish life from the perspective of those who lived it. Through a rotating collection that included artifacts, photographs, and documentary films, the Core Exhibition placed the Holocaust in the larger context of modern Jewish history. It was organized into three chronological sections: Jewish Life A Century Ago, The War Against the Jews, and Jewish Renewal—each told on a separate floor. It was housed in the museum's six-sided building, symbolic of the six points of the Star of David and the six million Jews murdered in the Holocaust.

The original core exhibition was redesigned, opening in June 2022. Although the earlier exhibition provided a comprehensive treatment of the rise of Nazis and the Holocaust on its second floor, the visitors' introduction to the museum was altered. A rotunda at the entrance, with a multimedia exhibition describing the differences of Jewish communities around the world as well as the commonality of Jewish culture, religious observance and values, was replaced by an exhibition wall focusing on April, 1943, when a confluence of key events in Holocaust history occurred. Other design changes eliminated the chronological approach as well as the basic museum path, reducing the context of the Holocaust in terms of Jewish history in favor of an emphasis on the Holocaust itself. Instead of visitors moving along the perimeters of the building, viewing a timeline with artifacts and then interacting chronologically with thematic rooms opposite the timeline, the viewer was given a path through a series of rooms organized by theme and making greater use of photographic enlargements and fewer artifacts. A technological innovation was the use of interactive holographs of survivors, programmed to answer the most likely questions visitors' might have.

On the morning of January 8, 2021, a Confederate flag was tied to the front door of the museum, less than two days after the January 6 United States Capitol attack by a pro-Donald Trump mob, some of whom carried Confederate flags into the Capitol building. The discovery of the flag prompted the filing of an aggravated harassment complaint.

In August 2022 Inna Vernikov withdrew her $5,000 donation to the museum for allegedly banning Florida governor Ron DeSantis from their events, though the museum denied banning anyone.

== Exhibitions and Installations ==
The museum's collection contains more than 30,000 objects relating to Jewish history and The Holocaust. These objects are used in a variety of exhibitions and installations.

=== Auschwitz. Not long ago. Not far away ===
This special exhibition opened in May 2019 and ran until August 30, 2020.

=== Ordinary Treasures: Highlights From The Museum Of Jewish Heritage Collection ===
This exhibition features drawings and everyday items, many of which were donated by the relatives of the original owners. The exhibition shows some aspects of daily life for European Jews under Nazi rule.

=== Andy Goldsworthy's Garden of Stones ===
Andy Goldsworthy's living memorial garden, his first permanent commission in New York City, opened to the public on September 17, 2003. An eloquent garden plan of trees growing from stone, the garden was planted by the artist, Holocaust survivors, and their families. This contemplative space, meant to be revisited and experienced differently over time as the garden matures, is visible from almost every floor of the museum.

=== Gerda III ===
Gerda III was a Danish rescue boat used in 1943 to save Jewish refugees by transporting then from Denmark to Sweden. The boat was donated to the museum by the Danish Parliament in 1997 and is on long-term loan to Mystic Seaport. The vessel's history is captured in the book Henny and Her Boat: Righteousness and Resistance in Nazi-Occupied Denmark.

=== Edmond J. Safra Hall ===
In the 375-seat Edmond J. Safra Hall, the museum offers a schedule of films, concerts, and panel discussions throughout the year. Past programs have included symposia on the Holocaust, interfaith dialogues, and concerts featuring established and emerging artists.

Over the last few years, the museum has held a day-long symposium on Darfur with policy makers and leaders on human rights; presented performers such as Idan Raichel and David Strathairn; hosted film screenings with actors and directors such as Kirk Douglas, John Turturro, Quentin Tarantino, Claude Lanzmann, and Ed Zwick; explored Justice after the Holocaust with experts like Alan Dershowitz; and hosted the revival of a Yiddish operetta, Die Goldene Kale.

=== Rendering Witness: Holocaust-Era Art as Testimony ===
This exhibition "features art made during and immediately after the Holocaust by those who lived it," including art made by prisoners in concentration camps and American liberators. The exhibit is intended to showcase the Holocaust as people saw it during the time.

=== The Holocaust: What Hate Can Do ===
The museum's core exhibition, The Holocaust: What Hate Can Do, opened in 2022 in the museum's main galleries. Spanning two floors and about 12,000 square feet, it presents more than 750 artifacts, many donated by survivors and their families who settled in the New York area, along with photographs, film, and survivor testimonies. The exhibition traces Jewish life before, during, and after the Holocaust.

=== Courage to Act: Rescue in Denmark ===
Courage to Act: Rescue in Denmark opened on October 15, 2023, and is scheduled to remain on view until October 15, 2028. It tells the story of the rescue of nearly 95 percent of Denmark's Jews during the Holocaust and was the museum's first exhibition designed for visitors aged nine and up.

== Affiliates ==
=== JewishGen ===
JewishGen is the leading internet site for Jewish genealogy and provides free online access to a vast collection of Jewish ancestral records. JewishGen and the museum affiliated in 2003. JewishGen features over 22 million records (including family trees containing 7 million individuals, 3 million burial records, and 2.75 million Holocaust records), hundreds of translated Yizkor Books, research tools, a family finder, educational classes, and many other constantly updated resources.

=== Auschwitz Jewish Center ===
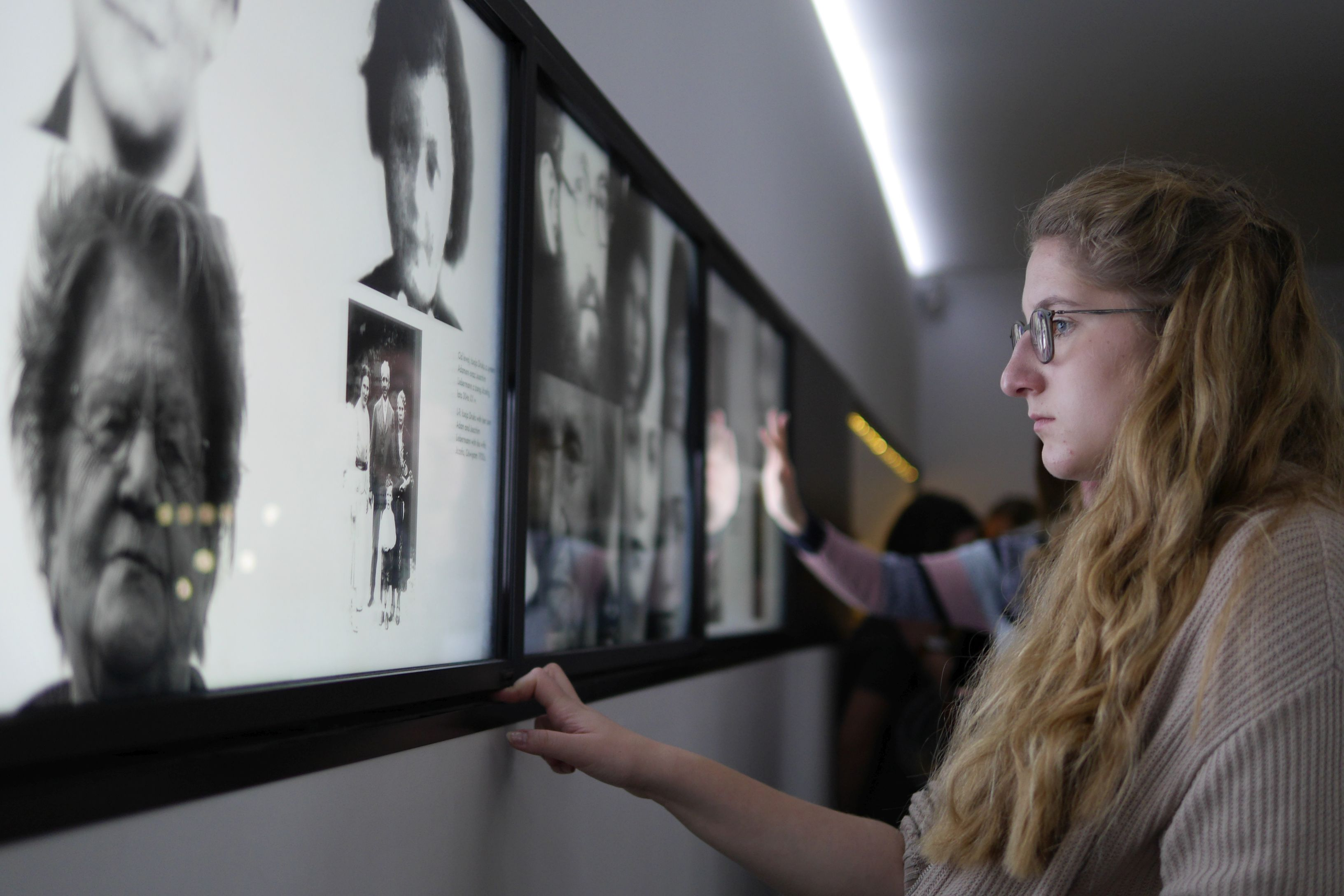
Memorial gallery at the Auschwitz Jewish Center

In addition to the New York campus, the museum has also been affiliated with the Auschwitz Jewish Center in Oświęcim, Poland, since 2006.

Before the invasion of Poland and later occupation of Poland by Nazi Germany Oświęcim (renamed Auschwitz by the Nazis) was just an ordinary Polish town. The majority of its citizens were Jewish. Following the end of the World War II Auschwitz became the ultimate symbol of the Holocaust. In September 2000, the Auschwitz Jewish Center opened its doors to honor the former residents of the town and to teach future generations about what was lost. Located less than 2 miles (3.2 km) from Auschwitz-Birkenau, it is the only remaining Jewish presence in the town.

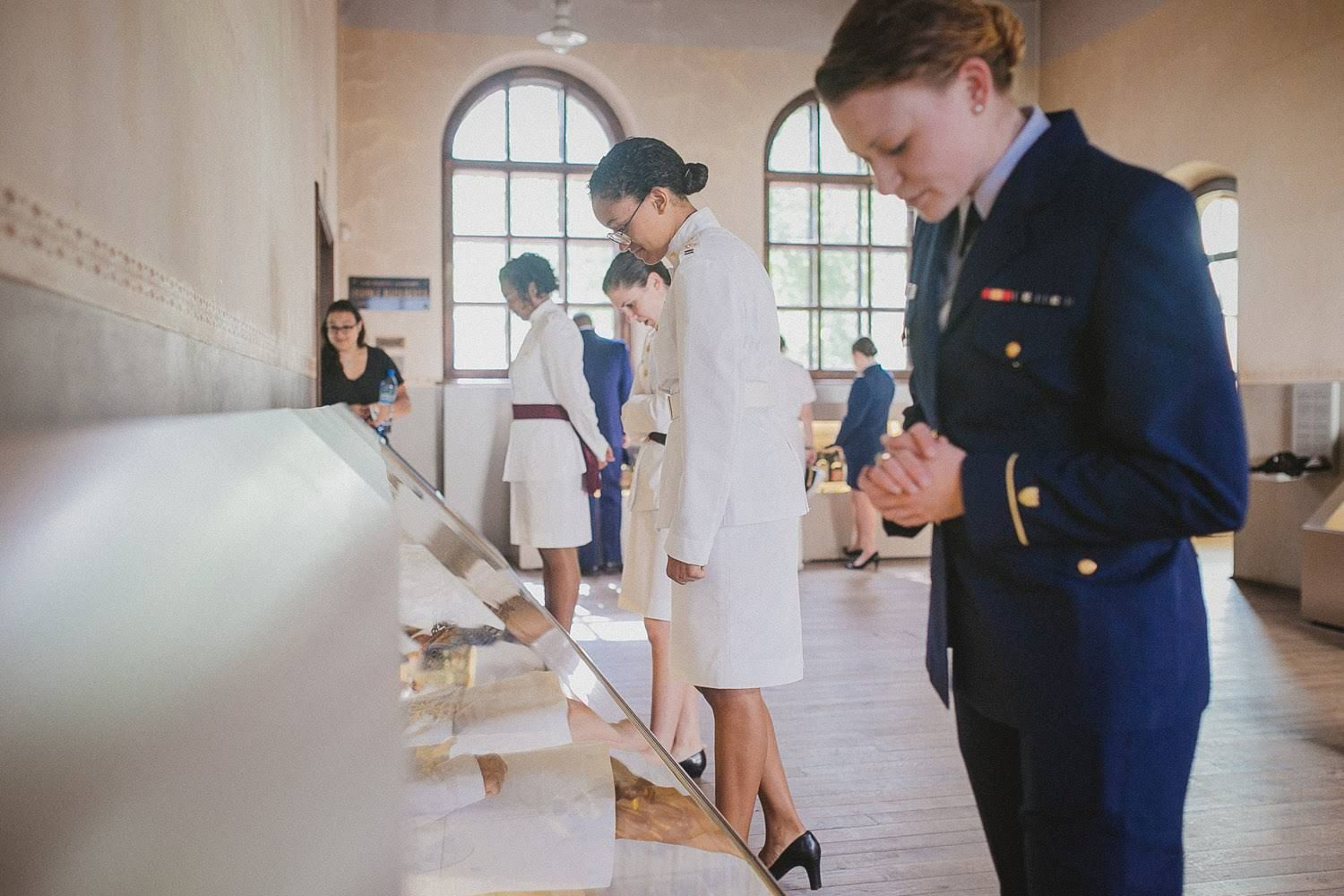
US cadets visiting the AJC in Oświęcim

The AJC's mission is also to provide all visitors with an opportunity to memorialize victims of the Holocaust through the study of the life and culture of a formerly Jewish town and to offer educational programs that allow new generations to explore the meaning and contemporary implications of the Holocaust. The Center provides regularly scheduled exhibitions and educational programs. The United States Service Academy Program takes cadets and midshipmen to Poland for a three-week trip to learn from survivors, scholars, and historians. The Auschwitz Jewish Center Fellows program is a three-and-a-half-week study trip for students who are matriculated in graduate programs or are completing undergraduate degrees.

=== National Yiddish Theatre Folksbiene ===
The National Yiddish Theatre Folksbiene is a professional theater company in New York City, founded in 1915, which produces both Yiddish plays and plays translated into Yiddish, in a theater equipped with simultaneous superscript translation into English. The theater company has been in residence at the Museum of Jewish Heritage since 2016.

== See also ==
- Holocaust memorials (worldwide)
- Jews in New York City
- List of museums and cultural institutions in New York City
