= Stage 42 =

Off-Broadway theater in Manhattan, New York

Coordinates: 40.7587°N 73.9938°W

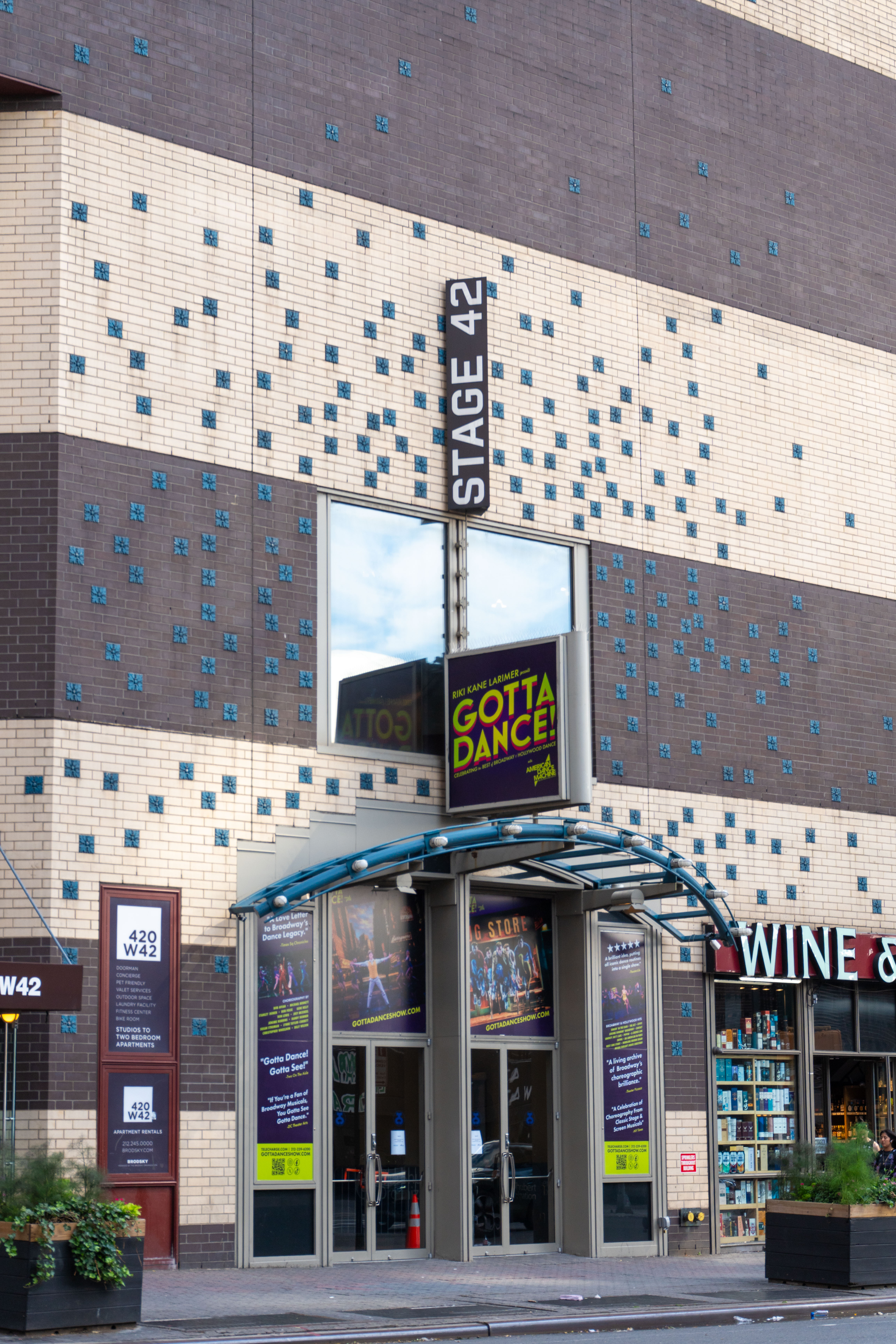
- Stage 42 in June 2026
- Interactive map of Stage 42
- Address: 422 West 42nd Street; New York City; United States
- Owner: The Shubert Organization
- Capacity: 499
- Type: Off-Broadway

Construction
- Opened: 2002
- Architect: Hugh Hardy

Website
- Stage 42

Stage 42 (known as the Little Shubert Theatre until July 2015) is a theatre in New York City on Theatre Row, about half a mile west of Broadway. Its address is 422 West 42nd Street, between 9th Avenue and Dyer Avenue. It was built in 2002 and has a seating capacity of 499, counting as an Off-Broadway theatre as it has fewer than 500 seats.

== Building history ==
The Little Shubert was the first Off-Broadway theatre in New York built from the ground up, and the first to be owned by the Shubert Organization. Built as part of a residential tower and opened in 2002, the Little Shubert was the first new theatre built by the Shubert Organization in New York City since the Ethel Barrymore Theatre, which opened on West 47th Street in 1928. It was designed by architect Hugh Hardy.

In July 2015, the Little Shubert Theatre was renamed to Stage 42. The name was changed to align with the naming conventions of the Shubert Organization's other Off-Broadway theatre complex, New World Stages, which has five venues named Stage 1 through Stage 5.

Stage 42 is one of the largest Off Broadway theatres, one seat short of the 500-seat minimum that would classify a theater as "on Broadway." However, it is an expensive venue to mount shows, partly due to contracts with theatrical unions. In 2011, theater producers speculated that Stage 42 might become a Tony-eligible Broadway house by the addition of one seat to bring it to the 500 seat minimum required for Tony eligibility; this has not happened, as going to 500 seats would require negotiating new contracts with the unions, raising costs further.

== Design ==
Stage 42 features an auditorium with stadium seating providing proximity to the stage. The stage itself and the orchestra pit are comparable in size to the dimensions of many Broadway theatres. There are eight wheelchair seats. There is an escalator and an elevator that can take guests from the ground floor to the level of the theater.

The interior features reproductions of artwork from the Shubert Archive, with warm colors throughout. The outside of the building has a marquee with "an ornamental canopy in architectural metal and glass."

== Show history ==
As the Little Shubert:

- Tommy Tune: White Tie and Tails, November 26, 2002 – January 5, 2003
- Hank Williams: Lost Highway, March 26, 2003 – July 20, 2003
- Fame on 42nd Street, October 7, 2003 – June 27, 2004
- Shockheaded Peter, February 11, 2005 – May 29, 2005
- Captain Louie, October 28, 2005 – November 13, 2005
- My Mother's Italian, My Father's Jewish and I'm in Therapy!, November 3, 2006 – April 29, 2007
- Three Mo' Tenors, September 12, 2007 – January 27, 2008
- Viagara Falls, July 5, 2010 – August 29, 2010
- Dracula, December 14, 2010 – January 9, 2011
- Lucky Guy, April 28, 2011 – May 29, 2011
- Potted Potter: The Unauthorized Harry Experience, May 19, 2012 – September 2, 2012
- Potted Potter: The Unauthorized Harry Experience, May 30, 2013 – September 1, 2013
- Lady Day, September 19, 2013 – December 22, 2013
- Under My Skin, April 5, 2014 – June 8, 2014

As Stage 42:

- Trip of Love, September 26, 2015 – August 7, 2016
- Smokey Joe's Cafe, July 6, 2018 – November 4, 2018
- Fidler Afn Dakh, February 11, 2019 – January 5, 2020
- Trevor, October 25, 2021 – December 19, 2021
- Kinky Boots, July 26, 2022 – November 20, 2022
- Dungeons & Dragons: The Twenty-Sided Tavern, April 19, 2024 – May 11, 2025
- Lord Nil: 7 Deadly Sins, July 21, 2025 – August 31, 2025
- Romy and Michele: The Musical, October 14, 2025 – November 30, 2025
- Gotta Dance!, March 20, 2026 – June 7, 2026
- A History of Paper, February 12 2027 – May 16, 2027
