= Folksbiene =

Theater company in New York City

National Yiddish Theatre Folksbiene
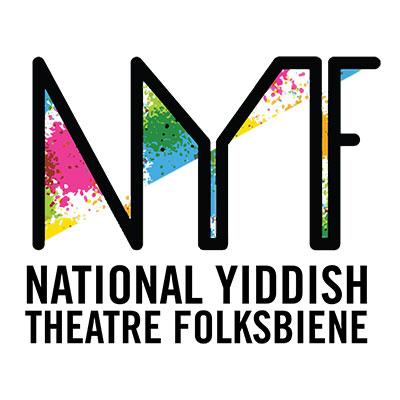
- Address: Edmond J. Safra Plaza, 36 Battery Place; New York City; United States
- Type: Yiddish Theatre, Performing Arts

Construction
- Opened: 1915

Website
- www.nytf.org

The National Yiddish Theatre Folksbiene (NYTF) is a professional theater company in New York City which produces both Yiddish plays and plays translated into Yiddish, in a theater equipped with simultaneous superscript translation into English. The company's leadership consists of executive director Dominick Balletta and artistic director Zalmen Mlotek. The board is co-chaired by Sandra Cahn and Carol Levin.

== History ==
Folksbiene (Yiddish: פֿאָלקסבינע, IPA: [ˈfɔlksˌbɪnə], "people's stage") was founded in 1915, under the auspices of the fraternal and Yiddish cultural organization Workmen's Circle, on New York City’s Lower East Side, as an amateur theatre group with high artistic ideals. It is the oldest consecutively producing theater company in the United States, English or Yiddish, commercial or not. The era when it was founded is considered to be the height of Yiddish theater; at the time there were 15 Yiddish theatre companies in the Yiddish Theater District in New York and many more worldwide. Due to the destruction of European Jewry by Nazi Germany, the Folksbiene is one of only five professional Yiddish theatre companies still in operation; also in New York City is the New Yiddish Rep, and the others are the State Jewish Theater in Bucharest, the Jewish Theatre in Warsaw and Yiddishpiel in Tel Aviv.

In late 2017, Folksbiene announced that it would stage the American premiere of Fiddler on the Roof in Yiddish, which has not been staged since its world premiere production in Israel more than 50 years ago. It was announced in March 2018 that Joel Grey would direct the production. Their production Fidler Afn Dakh had its first preview on July 4, 2018. The opening performance was July 15, 2018. The production won the 2019 Drama Desk Award For Best Musical Revival.

The company's 2006 production of Di Yam Gazlonim, a Yiddish adaptation of The Pirates of Penzance, by Al Grand, was nominated for the 2007 Drama Desk Award for Outstanding Musical Revival, and their 2012/13 Off Broadway production of The Golden Land was nominated for the 2013 Drama Desk Award for outstanding Musical Revival. In the summer of 2012, Folksbiene announced their plans to create an international festival of new works in celebration of their centennial in 2015. A play contest accompanying the festival was juried by producer Emanuel Azenberg; the Tony Award-winning composer and songwriter Jason Robert Brown ("Parade"), and the playwrights Joe DiPietro (Tony Award for "Memphis"); Obie Award-winning Israel Horovitz, and Pulitzer Prize finalist Jon Marans ("Old Wicked Songs").

A revival of the 1923 operetta The Golden Bride in 2015/16 drew press attention as a Theatre Critics Pick by The New York Times and garnered Drama Desk awards as well. The Folksbiene was a producer on the 2015/16 Broadway play Indecent.

In the Fall of 2017, the company staged an enhanced production of Abraham Goldfadn's The Sorceress as part of their restoration project – an endeavor that will restore lost or nearly lost Yiddish works to the canon of Yiddish culture. A fully stage production was mounted two years later in December 2019.

In 2022, Folksbiene presented Harmony: A New Musical, the New York debut of the musical by Barry Manilow and his longtime collaborator Bruce Sussman. The musical tells the true story of the Comedian Harmonists. The show ran at the Museum of Jewish Heritage from March 23 to May 8, 2022.

== Production history ==
- 2019: Hannah Senesh, The Sorceress, Harmony: A New Musical
- 2018: Early Yiddish Theatre and Vaudeville Concert, Fidler Afn Dakh
- 2017: Amerike the Golden Land, The Sorceress
- 2016: Di Goldene Kale (The Golden Bride)
- 2015: The Dybbuk, Di Goldene Kale (The Golden Bride)
- 2014: The Megile of Itzik Manger
- 2013: The Megile of Itzik Manger, Lies My Father Told Me
- 2012: Shlemiel The First, The Golden Land
- 2011: The Adventures of Hershele Ostropolyer
- 2010: Fyvush Finkel Live!, New Worlds: A Celebration of I. L. Peretz. A Gilgul Fun a Nigun (The Metamorphosis of a Melody), The Adventures of Hershele Ostropolyer
- 2009: Sholom Aleichem: Laughter Through Tears, Shpiel! Shpiel! Shpiel!]
- 2008: Gimpel Tam, Di Ksube (The Marriage Contract)
- 2006: Di Yam Gazlonim! (The Yiddish Pirates of Penzance), Bruce Adler in In a Guter Sho: A Yiddish Vaudeville
- 2005: On Second Avenue
- 2004: Di Kaprizne Kale (A Novel Romance), On Second A
- 2002: Yentl, The Mazldiker Mystery Tour: A Kids and Yiddish Adventure
- 2001: Kids and Yiddish 2001: A Space Mishegas – Spinning off in New Directions, Songs of Paradise: A Yiddish-English Musical
- 2000: An American Family: A Musical Saga
- 1999: Yoshke Muzikant (A Klezmers Tale)
- 1998: Zise Khaloymes (Sweet Dreams)

== See also ==
- Zypora Spaisman
- Shlemiel the First (play)
