= List of awards and nominations received by Bob Fosse =

List of Bob Fosse awards
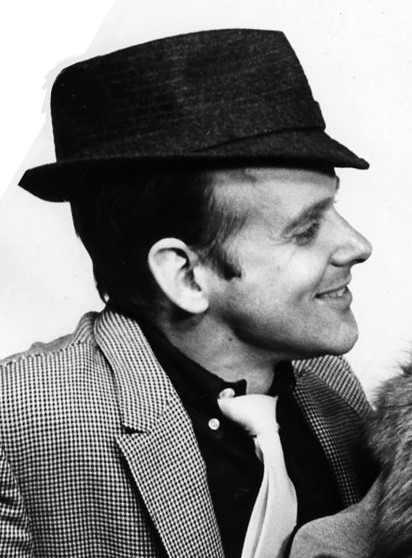
- Fosse in 1963
Award	Wins	Nominations
Academy Awards	1	4
British Academy Film Awards	1	1
Primetime Emmy Awards	3	3
Golden Globe Awards	0	2
Tony Awards	9	20

Bob Fosse was a dancer, choreographer, theatre and film director.

He directed and choreographed musical works on stage and screen, including the stage musicals The Pajama Game (1954), Damn Yankees (1955), How to Succeed in Business Without Really Trying (1961), Sweet Charity (1966), Pippin (1972), and Chicago (1975). His films include Sweet Charity (1969), Cabaret (1972), Lenny (1975), All That Jazz (1979), and Star 80 (1983).

Fosse's distinctive style of choreography included turned-in knees and "jazz hands". He is the only person ever to have won Oscar, Emmy, and Tony awards in the same year (1973). He was nominated for four Academy Awards, winning Best Director for Cabaret (1972) and won the Palme D'Or in 1980 for All That Jazz. He won a record eight Tonys for his choreography for The Pajama Game, Damn Yankees, Redhead, Little Me, Sweet Charity, Pippin, Dancin', and Big Deal, as well as one for direction for Pippin.

== Major awards ==
=== Academy Awards ===
Year	Category	Nominated work	Result	Ref.
1972	Best Director	Cabaret	Won	
1974	Best Director	Lenny	Nominated	
1979	Best Director	All That Jazz	Nominated	
1979	Best Screenplay – Written Directly for the Screen	All That Jazz	Nominated	

Directed Academy Award performances
Under Fosse's direction, these actors have received Academy Award nominations for their performances in their respective roles.

Year	Performer	Film	Result
Academy Award for Best Actor
1975	Dustin Hoffman	Lenny	Nominated
1980	Roy Scheider	All That Jazz	Nominated
Academy Award for Best Supporting Actor
1973	Joel Grey	Cabaret	Won
Academy Award for Best Actress
1973	Liza Minnelli	Cabaret	Won
1975	Valerie Perrine	Lenny	Nominated

=== British Academy Film Awards ===
Year	Category	Nominated work	Result	Ref.
1972	Best Direction	Cabaret	Won	

Directed BAFTA Award performances
Under Fosse's direction, these actors have received BAFTA Award nominations for their performances in their respective roles.

Year	Performer	Film	Result
BAFTA Award for Best Actor
1975	Dustin Hoffman	Lenny	Nominated
1980	Roy Scheider	All That Jazz	Nominated
BAFTA Award for Best Actress in a Leading Role
1972	Liza Minnelli	Cabaret	Won
1975	Valerie Perrine	Lenny	Nominated

=== Golden Globe Awards ===
Year	Category	Nominated work	Result	Ref.
1972	Best Director – Motion Picture	Cabaret	Nominated	
1974	Best Director – Motion Picture	Lenny	Nominated	

Directed Golden Globe Award performances
Under Fosse's direction, these actors have received Golden Globe Award nominations for their performances in their respective roles.

Year	Performer	Film	Result
Golden Globe Award for Best Actor - Motion Picture Drama
1974	Dustin Hoffman	Lenny	Nominated
1983	Eric Roberts	Star 80	Nominated
Golden Globe Award for Best Actor - Motion Picture Musical or Comedy
1980	Roy Scheider	All That Jazz	Nominated
Golden Globe Award for Best Actress - Motion Picture Drama
1974	Valerie Perrine	Lenny	Nominated
Golden Globe Award for Best Actress - Motion Picture Musical or Comedy
1969	Shirley MacLaine	Sweet Charity	Nominated
1972	Liza Minnelli	Cabaret	Won
Golden Globe Award for Best Supporting Actor – Motion Picture
1972	Joel Grey	Cabaret	Won
Golden Globe Award for Best Supporting Actress – Motion Picture
1972	Marisa Berenson	Cabaret	Nominated

=== Primetime Emmy Awards ===
Year	Category	Nominated work	Result	Ref.
1973	Outstanding Single Program – Variety and Popular Music	Liza with a Z	Won	
1973	Outstanding Directing for a Variety Special	Liza with a Z	Won	
1973	Outstanding Achievement in Choreography	Liza with a Z	Won	

=== Tony Awards ===
Year	Category	Nominated work	Result	Ref.
1955	Best Choreography	The Pajama Game	Won	
1956	Best Choreography	Damn Yankees	Won	
1957	Best Choreography	Bells are Ringing	Nominated	
1958	Best Choreography	New Girl in Town	Nominated	
1959	Best Choreography	Redhead	Won	
1963	Best Direction of a Musical	Little Me	Nominated	
1963	Best Choreography	Little Me	Won	
1964	Best Leading Actor in a Musical	Pal Joey	Nominated	
1966	Best Direction of a Musical	Sweet Charity	Nominated	
1966	Best Choreography	Sweet Charity	Won	
1973	Best Direction of a Musical	Pippin	Won	
1973	Best Choreography	Pippin	Won	
1976	Best Direction of a Musical	Chicago	Nominated	
1976	Best Book of a Musical	Chicago	Nominated	
1976	Best Choreography	Chicago	Nominated	
1978	Best Direction of a Musical	Dancin'	Nominated	
1978	Best Choreography	Dancin'	Won	
1986	Best Direction of a Musical	Big Deal	Nominated	
1986	Best Book of a Musical	Big Deal	Nominated	
1986	Best Choreography	Big Deal	Won	

Directed Tony Award performances
Under Fosse's direction, these actors have received Tony Award nominations for their performances in their respective roles.

Year	Performer	Film	Result
Tony Award for Best Actor in a Musical
1963	Sid Caesar	Little Me	Nominated
1973	Ben Vereen	Pippin	Won
1976	Jerry Orbach	Chicago	Nominated
Tony Award for Best Actress in a Musical
1966	Gwen Verdon	Sweet Charity	Nominated
1973	Leland Palmer	Pippin	Nominated
1976	Chita Rivera	Chicago	Nominated
1976	Gwen Verdon	Chicago	Nominated
Tony Award for Best Featured Actor in a Musical
1963	Swen Swenson	Little Me	Nominated
1966	John McMartin	Sweet Charity	Nominated
1978	Wayne Cilento	Dancin'	Nominated
Tony Award for Best Featured Actress in a Musical
1963	Virginia Martin	Little Me	Nominated
1966	Helen Gallagher	Sweet Charity	Nominated
1973	Irene Ryan	Pippin	Nominated
1978	Ann Reinking	Dancin'	Nominated

== Miscellaneous awards ==
=== American Choreography Awards ===
Year	Category	Nominated work	Result	Ref.
1994	Heritage Award	—N/a	Won	

=== Berlin International Film Festival ===
Year	Category	Nominated work	Result	Ref.
1984	Golden Bear	Star 80	Nominated	

=== Bodil Awards ===
Year	Category	Nominated work	Result	Ref.
1973	Best Non-European Film	Cabaret	Won	
1981	Best Non-European Film	All That Jazz	Won	

=== Cannes Film Festival ===
Year	Category	Nominated work	Result	Ref.
1975	Palme d'Or	Lenny	Nominated	
1980	Palme d'Or	All That Jazz	Won (Note: Tied with Akira Kurosawa for Kagemusha.)	

=== David di Donatello Awards ===
Year	Category	Nominated work	Result	Ref.
1979	Best Foreign Director	Cabaret	Won	

=== Directors Guild of America Awards ===
Year	Category	Nominated work	Result	Ref.
1972	Outstanding Directorial Achievement in Motion Pictures	Cabaret	Nominated	
1972	Outstanding Directorial Achievement in Musical/Variety	Liza with a Z	Won	
1974	Outstanding Directorial Achievement in Motion Pictures	Lenny	Nominated	

=== Drama Desk Awards ===
Year	Category	Nominated work	Result	Ref.
1973	Outstanding Director	Pippin	Won	
1973	Outstanding Choreography	Pippin	Won	
1978	Outstanding Choreography	Dancin'	Won	
1986	Outstanding Director of a Musical	Sweet Charity	Nominated	
1986	Outstanding Director of a Musical	Big Deal	Nominated	
1986	Outstanding Choreography	Big Deal	Won	

=== National Board of Review Awards ===
Year	Category	Nominated work	Result	Ref.
1972	Best Director	Cabaret	Won	

=== New York Film Critics Circle Awards ===
Year	Category	Nominated work	Result	Ref.
1979	Best Director	All That Jazz	3rd Place	

== Awards and nominations received by films directed by Fosse ==
Year	Title	Academy Awards		BAFTA Awards		Golden Globe Awards	
Year	Title	Nominations	Wins	Nominations	Wins	Nominations	Wins
1969	Sweet Charity	3				1	
1972	Cabaret	10	8	11	7	9	3
1974	Lenny	6		3	1	3	
1979	All That Jazz	9	4	6	2	1	
1983	Star 80					1	
Total		28	12	20	10	15	3
