= Nicole Fosse =

American actress and dancer

- Other name: Nicole Fosse Greiner
- Occupations: Actress; dancer
- Spouse: Andreas Greiner (died 2000)
- Children: 3
- Parents: Bob Fosse (father); Gwen Verdon (mother)

Nicole Fosse is an American actress and dancer. She is the only daughter of Gwen Verdon and Bob Fosse.

== Career ==
Fosse appeared in Miami Vice in the role of Lani Mueller and played Kristine in the film version of A Chorus Line. She also appeared as a member of the Ballet Chorus of the Opéra Populaire in the original Broadway cast of The Phantom of the Opera.

She has participated in productions involving her parents, including All That Jazz directed by her father, the 2009 Broadway revival of her father's musical revue Dancin' and the biographical miniseries Fosse/Verdon (2019). For her work as co-executive producer on the latter, she received a nomination for the Primetime Emmy Award for Outstanding Limited Series.

=== Fosse/Verdon ===
Fosse served as a creative consultant and co-executive producer of Fosse/Verdon (2019), which depicted her parents' romantic and creative partnerships. In working for the eight-part biographical mini-series, Fosse noted that aside from sharing facts and the emotional experiences of living with her famous parents, she also became more cognizant of what actually occurred during the years that the creative duo were together. In an interview, Michelle Williams, who played Gwen Verdon, said one of the most complicated dilemmas in Verdon's life was the long gap in her career as she stayed home to take care of her daughter. The series also depicts how Bob Fosse's girlfriend, Ann Reinking, taught young Nicole ballet, endearing herself to her mother, subsequently becoming part of the family.

== Personal life ==
Fosse was married to German stagehand Andreas Greiner, whom she met in Germany while in a touring production of West Side Story, until he was killed by a drunk driver in Salt Lake City, Utah, on August 10, 2000. She has three adult sons from their marriage named Sean, Noah, and Leif.

== Filmography ==
=== Film ===
Year	Title	Role	Notes
1979	All That Jazz	Dancer	
1985	A Chorus Line	Kristine	
2019	Merely Marvelous: The Dancing Genius of Gwen Verdon	Herself	Documentary

=== Television ===
Year	Title	Role	Notes
1986	Miami Vice	Lani Mueller	Episode: "Trust Fund Pirates"
2019	Fosse/Verdon	—N/a	Co-executive producer, 8 episodes
