= Fosse/Verdon =

2019 biographical miniseries

- Promotional poster
- Genre: Biographical drama
- Based on: Fosse by Sam Wasson
- Developed by: Steven Levenson; Thomas Kail
- Starring: Sam Rockwell; Michelle Williams; Norbert Leo Butz; Margaret Qualley
- Theme music composer: Alex Lacamoire
- Composer: Nathan Barr
- Country of origin: United States
- Original language: English
- No. of episodes: 8

Production
- Executive producers: Steven Levenson; Thomas Kail; Joel Fields; Lin-Manuel Miranda; George Stelzner; Sam Rockwell; Michelle Williams; Nicole Fosse
- Producers: Erica Kay; Kate Sullivan; Brad Carpenter
- Cinematography: Tim Ives
- Editors: Tim Streeto; Kate Sanford
- Running time: 41–59 minutes
- Production companies: West Egg Studios; 5000 Broadway Productions; Pyrrhic Victory Productions; Joel Fields Productions; Old 320 Sycamore; Fox 21 Television Studios; FX Productions

Original release
- Network: FX
- Release: April 9 – May 28, 2019

Fosse/Verdon is a 2019 American biographical drama miniseries, developed by Steven Levenson and Thomas Kail. Based on the biography Fosse by Sam Wasson, the series charts the troubled marriage and professional relationship of director/choreographer Bob Fosse and actress/dancer Gwen Verdon, played by Sam Rockwell and Michelle Williams, respectively. Norbert Leo Butz and Margaret Qualley are also featured as Paddy Chayefsky and Ann Reinking, respectively.

Fosse/Verdon premiered on FX on April 9, 2019, with its eighth and final episode airing on May 28. At the 71st Primetime Emmy Awards, Fosse/Verdon earned 17 nominations, including Outstanding Limited Series, with Williams winning Outstanding Lead Actress. Williams also won Best Actress at the 77th Golden Globe Awards and the 26th Screen Actors Guild Awards, where Rockwell won Best Actor.

== Premise ==
Fosse/Verdon tells the story of the romantic and creative partnership between Bob Fosse and Gwen Verdon. Fosse was a filmmaker and one of theater's most influential choreographers and directors. Verdon was a critically acclaimed actress and Broadway dancer who won 4 Tony Awards.

The story of the entire series unfolds through back-and-forth flashes of the couple's relationship through the years. It includes the reversals of power and status as well as the contexts in which they happened. It also presents Fosse and Verdon's contributions to the entertainment industry.

== Cast and characters ==
=== Main ===
- Sam Rockwell as Bob Fosse
  - Justin Gazzillo as young Bob
- Michelle Williams as Gwen Verdon
  - Kelli Berglund as young Gwen
- Norbert Leo Butz as Paddy Chayefsky, playwright, Bob's friend
- Margaret Qualley as Ann Reinking, actress-dancer

=== Recurring ===
- Aya Cash as Joan Simon, Neil's first wife
- Evan Handler as Hal Prince, director
- Nate Corddry as Neil Simon, playwright, Bob's friend
- Susan Misner as Joan McCracken, Bob's second wife
- Paul Reiser as Cy Feuer, producer
- Blake Baumgartner and Juliet Brett as Nicole Fosse
  - Chandler Head as Young Nicole
- Jake Lacy as Ron, Gwen's lover
- Kelli Barrett as Liza Minnelli, actress
- Bianca Marroquín as Chita Rivera, actress
- Ethan Slater as Joel Grey, actor
- Rick Holmes as Fred Weaver, Bob's first manager
- Peter Scolari as Mel, Gwen's manager
- Christiane Seidel as Hannah, German interpreter
- Byron Jennings as George Abbott, director
- Laura Osnes as Shirley MacLaine, actress
- Brandon Uranowitz as Dustin Hoffman, actor
- Tyler Hanes as Jerry Orbach, actor
- Wayne Wilcox as Michael Kidd, choreographer
- Lindsay Nicole Chambers as Leland Palmer, actress
- Santino Fontana as James Henaghan, Gwen's first husband
- Emily Dorsch as Gertrude Verdon, Gwen's mother
- Christopher Tocco as Jack Cole, choreographer
- Kelcy Griffin as Debbie Allen, actress
- Pamela Mitchell as Marsha Mason, actress
- Rema Webb as Paula Kelly, actress
- Spencer Moss as Mary Ann Fosse, Bob's sister
- David Turner as Ray Walston, actor
- George Bamford as Robert Surtees, cinematographer
- George R. Sheffey as David Bretherton, editor
- Jimmy Brewer as Stephen Schwartz, songwriter
- Tim Young as John Rubinstein, actor
- Peggy J. Scott as Irene Ryan, actress
- Sean Patrick Doyle as Michael O'Haughey, actor
- Ryan Vandenboom as Eddie Phillips, choreographer
- Anthony Rosenthal as Charlie Grass, choreographer
- Nicholas Baroudi as Scott Brady, actor
- Jeremy Shamos as Joseph Hardy, director
- Ahmad Simmons as Ben Vereen, actor
- Lin-Manuel Miranda as Roy Scheider, actor
- Paloma Garcia-Lee as Adrienne, dancer

== Episodes ==
No.	Title	Directed by	Written by	Original release date	Prod. code	U.S. viewers (millions)
1	"Life Is a Cabaret"	Thomas Kail	Story by : Steven Levenson & Thomas Kail; Teleplay by : Steven Levenson	April 9, 2019	1BHR01	0.614
Following the commercial failure of his filmmaking debut, Sweet Charity, Broadway director-choreographer Bob Fosse is determined to make his next directorial project, Cabaret, a success, even if it means defying producer Cy Feuer and cheating on his wife and creative collaborator, actress-dancer Gwen Verdon.
2	"Who's Got the Pain?"	Thomas Kail	Steven Levenson	April 16, 2019	1BHR02	0.425
As Gwen and Bob's marriage deteriorates following the discovery of his latest extramarital affair, Gwen reflects on how they first met during pre-production for Damn Yankees as well as how their personal and professional relationship began at the cost of Bob's marriage to ailing Broadway star Joan McCracken.
3	"Me and My Baby"	Adam Bernstein	Debora Cahn	April 23, 2019	1BHR03	0.453
With Bob focused on editing Cabaret, Gwen auditions for the leading role in a straight play that forces her to reflect on her disastrous first marriage and a career change that led to her breakthrough performance in Can-Can.
4	"Glory"	Jessica Yu	Tracey Scott Wilson	April 30, 2019	1BHR04	0.429
As Gwen struggles with her personal life following the opening (and closing) performance of Children! Children!, Bob juggles dealing with the success of Cabaret, spearheading production on Liza with a Z and Pippin, and grappling with the price of fame.
5	"Where Am I Going?"	Thomas Kail	Charlotte Stoudt	May 7, 2019	1BHR05	0.312
Three months after Joan Simon's death, and after Bob's stay in psychiatric care, tensions rise during a rainy night in Bob's Southampton summer home among his guests, including Gwen, Neil Simon, Paddy Chayefsky, and Ann Reinking.
6	"All I Care About Is Love"	Minkie Spiro	Ike Holter	May 14, 2019	1BHR06	0.364
An overworked Bob suffers a heart attack while balancing the editing of Lenny and the rehearsals for Chicago. In the hospital, he remembers the sexual abuse he endured as a teenager.
7	"Nowadays"	Thomas Kail	Joel Fields & Steven Levenson	May 21, 2019	1BHR07	0.367
Gwen and Bob continue work on Chicago, which Bob keeps pulling in a darker direction. The show opens to middling reviews. Later in the run, Gwen gets a vocal infection, and Bob gets Liza Minnelli to go on for her in her absence.
8	"Providence"	Thomas Kail	Story by : Joel Fields & Steven Levenson; Teleplay by : Steven Levenson	May 28, 2019	1BHR08	0.495
The final years of Bob's life are portrayed, from filming All That Jazz through directing and choreographing the revival of Sweet Charity, up to the final moment where he has a heart attack in D.C. and collapses in Gwen's arms.

== Music ==
Fosse/Verdon released weekly albums, available for streaming and download on multiple platforms, with the release of each new episode. In addition to original music, the soundtracks feature the cast singing popular songs from Bob Fosse and Gwen Verdon's various careers, including "Big Spender" from Sweet Charity and "Corner of the Sky" from Pippin.

Episode 1 ("Life is a Cabaret")
No.	Title	Artist(s)	Length
1.	"Big Spender"	Bianca Marroquin, Rema Webb & The Fandango Girls	3:34
2.	"Cabaret"	Kelli Barrett	3:34
3.	"Fosse/Verdon Theme"	Alex Lacamoire	1:01

Episode 2 ("Who's Got the Pain?")
No.	Title	Artist(s)	Length
1.	"Heart"	P. J. Benjamin, Nick Blaemire, Brian Cali & Aaron Kaburick	3:00

Episode 3 ("Me and My Baby")
No.	Title	Artist(s)	Length
1.	"Mein Herr"	Kelli Barrett & The Kit Kat Girls	3:17
2.	"Two Ladies"	Ethan Slater, Alysha Umphress & Morgan Weed	2:14

Episode 4 ("Glory")
No.	Title	Artist(s)	Length
1.	"Corner of the Sky"	Tim Young	3:17
2.	"I Guess I'll Miss the Man"	Blake Baumgartner	2:09

Episode 5 ("Where Am I Going?")
No.	Title	Artist(s)	Length
1.	"Pas De Deux"	Nathan Barr	1:35
2.	"Where Am I Going?"	Alex Lacamoire	1:52

Episode 6 ("All I Care About Is Love")
No.	Title	Artist(s)	Length
1.	"All That Jazz"	Bianca Marroquin	2:52

Episode 7 ("Nowadays")
No.	Title	Artist(s)	Length
1.	"We Both Reached For The Gun"	Tyler Hanes, Sean Patrick Doyle & The Cast of Fosse/Verdon	3:45
2.	"Razzle Dazzle"	Michelle Williams & The Cast of Fosse Verdon	2:13

Episode 8 ("Providence")
No.	Title	Artist(s)	Length
1.	"Mr. Bojangles"	Lin-Manuel Miranda	4:14

== Production ==
=== Development ===
The rights to produce a limited-series based on Sam Wasson's biography Fosse were sold to FX Network by executive producer George Stelzner. In the summer of 2016, with the approval of FX creative executives, Stelzner pursued actor/writer Lin-Manuel Miranda and director Thomas Kail, of Hamilton, to join the project. Both Miranda and Kail were familiar with the Wasson biography as Miranda and Wasson were classmates at Wesleyan University years earlier. Tony Award-winning writer Steven Levenson (Dear Evan Hansen) was next to join the production team. Levenson and Kail would go on to earn the WGA credit designation of "developed for television by" for the limited-series. During the early stages of the development process, the two were instrumental in attracting the participation of Nicole Fosse, the only child of Bob and Gwen and the executor of the Fosse/Verdon estate.

On July 5, 2018, FX announced an eight-episode order for a limited-series entitled Fosse/Verdon, with Sam Rockwell playing the role of Bob Fosse and Michelle Williams playing Gwen Verdon. On October 25, 2018, it was reported that Kail would direct at least four of the series' eight episodes. and he would go on to direct a total of five episodes. Executive producers included Levenson, Kail, Miranda, Stelzner, Rockwell and Williams, with Nicole Fosse as a co-executive producer, and choreographer Andy Blankenbuehler (Hamilton) as co-producer. On October 26, 2018, it was announced that Joel Fields, the showrunner of the acclaimed FX Network drama series The Americans would join the Fosse/Verdon production as an additional writer and executive producer. On January 23, 2019, the premiere date of April 9, 2019 was announced.

=== Casting ===
Alongside the series order announcement, it was confirmed that Rockwell and Williams had been cast as the leads. On November 19, 2018, it was announced Margaret Qualley and Norbert Leo Butz had been cast in series regular roles and that Aya Cash, Nate Corddry, Susan Misner, Bianca Marroquín, Kelli Barrett, Evan Handler, Rick Holmes, Paul Reiser, Ethan Slater, Byron Jennings, and Laura Osnes had joined the cast in a recurring capacity.

Qualley consulted heavily with Reinking on her performance, with the two holding chats twice a week for the duration of the shoot. Reinking was not a consultant on the series but praised the performances of Rockwell and Williams, though she was conflicted about the portrayal of Fosse as an abusive partner.

=== Filming ===
Principal photography for the series commenced in late October 2018 in New York City at Silvercup Studios, and lasted until late March 2019.

== Release ==
On January 6, 2019, a teaser trailer for the series was released. In the United Kingdom, the BBC picked up the rights and the show premiered on BBC Two.

== Reception ==
=== Critical response ===
On the review aggregator Rotten Tomatoes, the series holds an approval rating of 81% based on 88 reviews, and an average rating of 7.12/10. The website's critical consensus reads, "Sam Rockwell and Michelle Williams give viewers plenty of razzle and dazzle in Fosse/Verdon - a straightforward miniseries that is hampered by rote biographical tropes, but still shimmies with the requisite glitz, grit, and all that jazz audiences crave." Metacritic, which uses a weighted average, assigned the series a score of 68 out of 100, based on 34 critics, indicating "generally favorable reviews".

=== Ratings ===
Viewership and ratings per episode of Fosse/Verdon
No.	Title	Air date	Rating (18–49)	Viewers (millions)	DVR (18–49)	DVR viewers (millions)	Total (18–49)	Total viewers (millions)
1	"Life Is a Cabaret"	April 9, 2019	0.1	0.614	0.2	0.729	0.3	1.344
2	"Who's Got the Pain?"	April 16, 2019	0.1	0.425	—N/a	0.597	—N/a	1.023
3	"Me and My Baby"	April 23, 2019	0.1	0.453	—N/a	0.505	—N/a	0.959
4	"Glory"	April 30, 2019	0.1	0.429	—N/a	0.480	—N/a	0.910
5	"Where Am I Going?"	May 7, 2019	0.1	0.312	—N/a	0.565	—N/a	0.878
6	"All I Care About Is Love"	May 14, 2019	0.1	0.364	—N/a	0.442	—N/a	0.806
7	"Nowadays"	May 21, 2019	0.1	0.367	—N/a	0.492	—N/a	0.859
8	"Providence"	May 28, 2019	0.1	0.495	—N/a	0.497	—N/a	0.992

== Awards and nominations ==
Award	Category	Nominee(s)	Result	Ref.
Art Directors Guild Awards	Television Movie or Limited Series	Alex DiGerlando	Nominated	
Casting Society of America	Limited Series	Bernard Telsey, Tiffany Little Canfield & Amelia Rasche McCarthy	Nominated	
Costume Designers Guild Awards	Excellence in Period Television	Melissa Toth & Joseph La Corte (for "Life is a Cabaret")	Nominated	
Critics' Choice Television Awards	Best Limited Series	Fosse/Verdon	Nominated	
Critics' Choice Television Awards	Best Actor in a Limited Series or Television Movie	Sam Rockwell	Nominated	
Critics' Choice Television Awards	Best Actress in a Limited Series or Television Movie	Michelle Williams	Won	
Critics' Choice Television Awards	Best Supporting Actress in a Limited Series or Television Movie	Margaret Qualley	Nominated	
Directors Guild of America Awards	Outstanding Directing – Movies for Television and Limited Series	Thomas Kail (for "Nowadays")	Nominated	
Directors Guild of America Awards	Outstanding Directing – Movies for Television and Limited Series	Minkie Spiro (for "All I Care About Is Love")	Nominated	
Directors Guild of America Awards	Outstanding Directing – Movies for Television and Limited Series	Jessica Yu (for "Glory")	Nominated	
Golden Globe Awards	Best Limited Series or Television Film	Fosse/Verdon	Nominated	
Golden Globe Awards	Best Actor – Limited Series or Television Film	Sam Rockwell	Nominated	
Golden Globe Awards	Best Actress – Limited Series or Television Film	Michelle Williams	Won	
Make-Up Artists and Hair Stylists Guilds	Television Series, Mini-Series or New Media – Best Period and/or Character Make-Up	Debbie Zoller, Dave Presto & Jackie Risotto	Won	
Make-Up Artists and Hair Stylists Guilds	Television Series, Mini-Series or New Media – Best Special Make-Up Effects	Debbie Zoller, Dave Presto & Jackie Risotto	Nominated	
Make-Up Artists and Hair Stylists Guilds	Television Series, Mini-Series or New Media – Best Period and/or Character Hair Styling	Christopher Fulton, Christen Edwards & Christine Cantrell	Won	
Primetime Emmy Awards	Outstanding Limited Series	Steven Levenson, Thomas Kail, Lin-Manuel Miranda, Joel Fields, George Stelzner, Sam Rockwell, Michelle Williams, Nicole Fosse, Charlotte Stoudt, Tracey Scott Wilson, Kate Sullivan, Brad Carpenter & Erica Kay	Nominated	
Primetime Emmy Awards	Outstanding Lead Actor in a Limited Series or Movie	Sam Rockwell	Nominated	
Primetime Emmy Awards	Outstanding Lead Actress in a Limited Series or Movie	Michelle Williams	Won	
Primetime Emmy Awards	Outstanding Supporting Actress in a Limited Series or Movie	Margaret Qualley	Nominated	
Primetime Emmy Awards	Outstanding Directing for a Limited Series, Movie, or Dramatic Special	Thomas Kail (for "Who's Got the Pain")	Nominated	
Primetime Emmy Awards	Outstanding Directing for a Limited Series, Movie, or Dramatic Special	Jessica Yu (for "Glory")	Nominated	
Primetime Emmy Awards	Outstanding Writing for a Limited Series, Movie, or Dramatic Special	Joel Fields & Steven Levenson (for "Providence")	Nominated	
Primetime Creative Arts Emmy Awards	Outstanding Casting for a Limited Series, Movie, or Special	Tiffany Little Canfield & Bernie Telsey	Nominated	
Primetime Creative Arts Emmy Awards	Outstanding Period Costumes	Joseph La Corte, Melissa Toth, Catherine Crabtree, Kristin Isola, Isabelle Simone & Virginia Patton (for "Life is a Cabaret")	Nominated	
Primetime Creative Arts Emmy Awards	Outstanding Hairstyling for a Limited Series or Movie	Christopher Fulton, Christen Edwards, Nicole Bridgeford, Christine Cantrell & Charlene Belmond	Won	
Primetime Creative Arts Emmy Awards	Outstanding Make-up for a Limited Series or Movie (Non-Prosthetic)	Debbie Zoller, Blair Aycock, Dave Presto, Sherri Laurence, Nicky Pattison Illum & Jackie Risotto	Won	
Primetime Creative Arts Emmy Awards	Outstanding Prosthetic Makeup for a Series, Limited Series, Movie or Special	Debbie Zoller, Dave Presto, Jackie Risotto, Yoichi Art Sakamoto & Vincent Van Dyke	Nominated	
Primetime Creative Arts Emmy Awards	Outstanding Music Direction	Alex Lacamoire (for "Life Is a Cabaret")	Won	
Primetime Creative Arts Emmy Awards	Outstanding Music Supervision	Steven Gizicki (for "Life Is a Cabaret")	Nominated	
Primetime Creative Arts Emmy Awards	Outstanding Single-Camera Picture Editing for a Limited Series or Movie	Tim Streeto (for "Life Is a Cabaret")	Nominated	
Primetime Creative Arts Emmy Awards	Outstanding Production Design for a Narrative Period or Fantasy Program (One Hour or More)	Alex DiGerlando, Anu Schwartz & Lydia Marks	Nominated	
Primetime Creative Arts Emmy Awards	Outstanding Sound Mixing for a Limited Series or Movie	Tony Volante, Joseph White Jr., Robert Johanson & Derik Lee (for "All I Care About is Love")	Nominated	
Producers Guild of America Awards	Outstanding Producer of Limited Series Television	Thomas Kail, Steven Levenson, Lin-Manuel Miranda, Joel Fields, George Stelzner, Sam Rockwell, Michelle Williams, Tracey Scott Wilson, Charlotte Stoudt, Nicole Fosse, Erica Kay, Kate Sullivan & Brad Carpenter	Nominated	
Satellite Awards	Best Miniseries	Fosse/Verdon	Nominated	
Satellite Awards	Best Actor in a Miniseries or TV Film	Sam Rockwell	Nominated	
Satellite Awards	Best Actress in a Miniseries or TV Film	Michelle Williams	Won	
Screen Actors Guild Awards	Outstanding Performance by a Male Actor in a Miniseries or Television Movie	Sam Rockwell	Won	
Screen Actors Guild Awards	Outstanding Performance by a Female Actor in a Miniseries or Television Movie	Michelle Williams	Won	
TCA Awards	Outstanding Achievement in Movies, Miniseries and Specials	Fosse/Verdon	Nominated	
TCA Awards	Individual Achievement in Drama	Michelle Williams	Won	
Writers Guild of America Awards	Long Form – Adapted	Debora Cahn, Joel Fields, Ike Holter, Thomas Kail, Steven Levenson, Charlotte Stoudt & Tracey Scott Wilson; Based on the book Fosse by Sam Wasson	Won	
