= Wayne Cilento =

American director and choreographer

- Born: Wayne Louis Cilento; August 28, 1949 (age 76); New York City, New York, USA
- Occupations: Director, Choreographer, actor, dancer

Wayne Louis Cilento (born August 28, 1949) is an American director, choreographer, actor and dancer. He is best known for originating the role of Mike in the Broadway show A Chorus Line, and later becoming one of Broadway's most prolific choreographers.

== Biography ==
=== Early life ===
Cilento was born in the Bronx, New York City, and later moved to suburban Westchester County. Though he attended one dance class when he was seven or eight, the teacher zeroed in on him; he panicked and didn't return. When he was in high school, he saw the original production of Cabaret and was so taken with the show, he decided "I really could do that." He auditioned for his high school musicals, got the dance leads, and started taking dance class twice a week. He continued to study dance at SUNY College at Brockport '72 where he met his mentor Bill Glassman of the American Ballet Theatre. "He was short and straight--someone I could use as a role model."

Not long after he married high school sweetheart Cathy Colety, Cilento made his Broadway musical debut in the chorus of Seesaw. This marked his first exposure to working with Michael Bennett as choreographer. He worked on the infamous Rachael Lily Rosenbloom and Don't You Ever Forget It, where he met many of his future A Chorus Line co-stars, and Irene when he was invited to attend Bennett's workshop sessions of A Chorus Line in 1974–5.

=== Career ===
==== A Chorus Line and Broadway ====
As a member of the original cast, the role of Mike, the short, athletic and aggressive dancer, was based on Cilento's own personality. He introduced the song "I Can Do That", although the specific story was actually that of another performer, Sammy Williams. One of the larger roles in the show, he was a standout and received much attention at the time. During the development of the show, the creators also toyed with Cilento having a second solo titled "Joanne" about his first crush on a girl (done in a Gene Kelly-style dance), and appearing as a backup dancer for Cassie's nightclub act, which was later cut. Along with the rest of the cast, he is featured on the iconic marketing materials for the show, and he won the Theater World Award for ensemble in 1976.

His next project was The Act with Liza Minnelli, followed by a stunning turn in Bob Fosse's dance revue, Dancin'. This intensive dance concert-style show earned Cilento his first Tony nomination for Best Featured Actor in a Musical. "In A Chorus Line”, Cilento enthused, “people were standing around talking about dancing, here we were actually dancing!" He appeared in Fosse's next project Big Deal, as well as the Frank Loesser revue Perfectly Frank, and the lead in the tour of the Jack Cole musical Jack. He also had a small role in the film Annie with Ann Reinking and Pamela Blair.

In this period, he was featured in more than 100 national commercials, including spots for VISA, Dr Pepper, Burger King, McDonald's, Kmart, and Dairy Queen.

==== Direction and choreographic career ====
In the early 1980s, Cilento started building a career as a director and choreographer. Concert stage and television include Alicia Keys, Liza Minnelli, Chita Rivera, Donna Summer, Jonas Brothers and Pete Townshend. Music videos for Billy Joel's "Keeping the Faith" and Barry Manilow's "Read 'em and Weep" followed with a PBS special called Spirit - A Journey in Dance, Drums and Song and dozens of commercials, for which he has won two Clio Awards.

He turned to full-scale musicals with the Jerry Herman revue, Jerry's Girls (with Chita Rivera) and Baby, for which he earned his second Tony nomination. His choreography profile increased again when he won both a Tony Award and a Drama Desk Award for the musical The Who's Tommy in 1993. He repeated the success in London in 1996 with a Laurence Olivier Award nomination. He recreated Fosse's style in the How to Succeed in Business Without Really Trying revival in 1995 and Sweet Charity and has staged two new musicals, Aida and Wicked, two of the biggest hits of the 2000s. Cilento staged the hip-hop musical Holler If Ya Hear Me featuring the music of Tupac Shakur and directed the American Dance Machine 2015–16 season at The Joyce Theater. In 2023, he directed and staged the first revival of Dancin' on Broadway, which received positive reviews and 7 Chita Rivera Award nominations in recognition of its dancers.

=== Personal life ===
Cilento resides in Mamaroneck, New York with his wife Cathy. They have three sons, Brian, Keith, and Doug.

== Stage work ==
- Dancin' (2023)
- American Dance Machine (2015)
- Holler If Ya Hear Me (2014)
- Sweet Charity (2005 revival)
- Wicked (2003)
- Aida (2000)
- Dream (1997)
- How to Succeed in Business Without Really Trying (1995 revival)
- The Who's Tommy (1993)
- Jerry's Girls (1985)
- Baby (1983)
- Joseph and the Amazing Technicolor Dreamcoat (1982)
- Big Deal (1986)
- Dancin' (1978)
- The Act (1977)
- A Chorus Line (1975)
- Irene (1974)
- Rachael Lily Rosenbloom (And Don't You Ever Forget It) (1973)
- Seesaw (1973)

== Awards and nominations ==
Awards

- 1976 Theatre World Award for Ensemble Performance – A Chorus Line
- 1993 Drama Desk Award for Outstanding Choreography – The Who's Tommy
- 1993 Tony Award for Best Choreography – The Who's Tommy

Nominations

- 1978 Tony Award for Best Featured Actor in a Musical – Dancin'
- 1984 Tony Award for Best Choreography – Baby
- 1995 Tony Award for Best Choreography – How to Succeed in Business Without Really Trying
- 1997 Laurence Olivier Award for Best Theatre Choreographer of 1996 – The Who's Tommy
- 1997 Tony Award for Best Choreography – Dream
- 2004 Tony Award for Best Choreography – Wicked
- 2005 Tony Award for Best Choreography – Sweet Charity

== Sources ==
- Dance Magazine, "Wayne Cilento: The Saga of a Broadway Dance Man", August 1982
- Flinn, Denny Martin, What They Did for Love: The Untold Story Behind the making of A Chorus Line, Bantam, 1989. ISBN 0-553-34593-1
- Viagas, Robert, Baayork Lee, and Thommie Walsh, On the Line: The Creation of A Chorus Line, Morrow, 1990.
