= Jennifer Nairn-Smith =

Australian dancer, actress, and choreographer

Jennifer Nairn-Smith is an Australian-born dancer, actress and choreographer. She was a member of the New York city Ballet from 1963 to 1968, at Lincoln Center, NYC. She trained at choreographer's School of American Ballet before being accepted into the NYCB. Her teachers there were Madame Felia Dubrovska, Muriel Stewart, Madame Danilova, Pierre Vladimirov, Stanley Williams. George Ballanchine.

== Career ==
=== Stage ===
Nairn-Smith appeared in the original Broadway productions of Follies and Pippin.

=== Film and television ===
Her film and TV appearances include the Bob Fosse autobiographical musical All That Jazz (1979), The Best Little Whorehouse in Texas (1982) and Return to Eden (1983).

=== Music Videos ===
Nairn-Smith is the protagonist in the music video for the single "Wandering Star" by the band of Poliça.
