= Dancin' =

1978 musical by Bob Fosse

- Original Broadway Production Poster
- Music: Various
- Lyrics: Various
- Productions: 1978 Broadway; 2023 Broadway

Dancin' is a musical revue created, directed, and choreographed by Bob Fosse and originally produced on Broadway in 1978. The plotless, dance-driven revue is a tribute to the art of dance, matched with a wide variety of music styles, from classical to jazz to American pop songs. The original production received seven 1978 Tony Award nominations, with Fosse winning for best choreography.

Original cast member Wayne Cilento helmed the first Broadway revival in 2023.

== Concept and development ==
In summer 1977, with the development of his film All That Jazz on hold, Fosse decided to eschew collaborators and create a new musical without a story or script, constructed entirely from pre-existing songs, using his choreography as the "words". Fosse witnessed Michael Bennett's tremendous success with the dance-focused musical A Chorus Line, but observed that it actually featured very little dancing in proportion to its talking and singing. For many years Fosse had been working toward choreographing a full ballet, first for the Harkness Ballet in New York, and later, for the Joffrey Ballet, most likely out of a desire to achieve the same status as ballet-turned-Broadway choreographers Jerome Robbins and Agnes DeMille, thinking a ballet would "legitimize" him because it was considered a "serious art form" compared to musical theatre dance. However, despite negotiating for a decade with Robert Joffrey, Fosse's ballet never moved beyond the idea stage.

Instead, Fosse's concept for this new show was to use classical and show music, popular music, rock and roll, Mozart, Bach, George M. Cohan, and contemporary music by Neil Diamond and Melissa Manchester, anything except a new score written by a collaborator. He stated publicly that the project would free him from the burden of an artistic partnership: "When you have collaborators, you have all those midnight meetings. I'm tired of those... So I just decided to meet myself at midnight." In a contemporaneous interview, Fosse told the Bulletin: "With a heart attack behind me, I just didn't feel I could spend time on a book musical ... that kind of show takes about three years to do. I didn't have those years to sit with a composer and to evolve a book. So I went with music that was already published and forgot about story." Later, on the opening night of Dancin', famed librettist Alan Jay Lerner sent Fosse a telegram that said: "You finally did it. You got rid of the author".

Fosse started working on the show in August 1977; intimidated by the idea of having to choreograph two hours worth of material, he asked dancer and choreographer Graciela Daniele to contribute a few numbers to the show, but she declined, saying: "When you are out of ideas, call me. I have the feeling that once you get into it, you're going to want to do it all." He didn't call, eventually devising choreography for the entire show, except for the finale, "Yankee Doodle Disco", which was choreographed by cast member Christopher Chadman. That month, Variety reported that Fosse's all new dance revue would be called Dancers– the title eventually changed to Dancin', with the subtitle "A New Musical Entertainment". For his cast, Fosse saw over 1,000 dancers during auditions, settling on 16, including his muse, Ann Reinking; Charles Ward, a principal dancer with the American Ballet Theatre; Edward Love, who had danced with Alvin Ailey; Fosse stalwarts Christopher Chadman, John Mineo, and Richard Korthaze; and new members of the Fosse family like Wayne Cilento.

Three months of rehearsal (instead of the usual eight weeks) began at the end of 1977: on the first day, Fosse told the assembled cast: "This is a show about dancing. You have to love to dance, or you should not be in this show. If you do not love it, get out, please. It's going to be hard work for the next three months. You're going to be exhausted, but that's what this show is about."

Despite the lack of creative partners, Fosse still had to negotiate with his co-producer Bernard Jacobs, the president of The Shubert Organization. While the show was out of town in Boston, Jacobs objected to the old-fashioned, literal minded Broadway-style ballet "Big City Mime", which depicted a tourist in Time Square coming in contact with prostitutes, massage parlors, and dance halls. Jacobs also objected to "The Dream Barre", another more risqué number featuring Ann Reinking and Charles Ward. Fosse bowed to Jacobs on "Big City Mime", cutting the number, but stood his ground on "The Dream Barre", which would remain in the show until being cut years later on tour. The rest of the show's numbers impressed audiences, and because Fosse co-produced the show, it became his biggest financial success in the theatre.

== Original Broadway production ==
Following its out of town tryout in Boston, Dancin' opened on Broadway at the Broadhurst Theatre on March 27, 1978. It later transferred to the Ambassador Theatre, and closed on June 27, 1982, after 1,774 performances (including previews). Dancin' was a milestone musical for dancers, both artistically and financially; for the first time ever, the entire company of a Broadway show was given principal contracts under Equity, which meant higher salaries. It was a very strenuous show; injuries were common, and the dancers were asked to do more than had ever been asked of dancers on Broadway before or since.

Dancin' was nominated for seven and won two Tony Awards. Fosse won for his choreography, and Jules Fisher won for his lighting design. Fisher said that sound designer Abe Jacob should have won a Tony Award, but there was no category for sound design until three decades later.

Dancin' received two national tours, the first from April 16, 1979 to May 18, 1980, and the second from July 29, 1980 to October 9, 1983. Dancin' also ran for a limited season in 1983 at Theatre Royal, Drury Lane in Westminster, London. Previews began on November 11, 1983, with the official opening on 14 November 1983, and closing on 28 January 1984. The revue was once again directed by Fosse. At the time of his death in 1987, Fosse was said to be working on Dancin' Too, his proposed followup to Dancin'.

Following Broadway, national tours, and London, the show was not performed or revived because the choreography is so demanding. However, several numbers from Dancin' were recreated for the 1999 dance review Fosse, including: "Crunchy Granola Suite", "I Wanna Be a Dancin' Man", "Percussion V", "Mr. Bojangles", and "Sing Sing Sing". A revival of Dancin' was scheduled to be produced by the Roundabout Theatre Company at Studio 54 for 2009, but it was postponed until the 2009–10 season, and then postponed indefinitely.

== 2023 Broadway revival ==
It was announced on November 11, 2022, that a revival of the show, styled as Bob Fosse's Dancin' and directed by original cast member Wayne Cilento and produced by Joey Parnes by special arrangement with Nicole Fosse, would play at the Music Box Theatre on Broadway, with opening night on March 19, 2023.

The new staging played a pre-Broadway try-out run at San Diego's Old Globe Theatre in the summer of 2022, and featured new material, including songs from Fosse's final Broadway musical Big Deal (1986) and restoration of the "Big City Mime" sequence that had been cut from the original production out of town in Boston.

The new production also makes a nod to the film universe of Fosse, with a set design featuring scaffolding reminiscent of his film All That Jazz, and the inclusion of short dances from Fosse's early career in Hollywood, like "From This Moment On" from the film of Kiss Me, Kate (Fosse's first on-film choreography), and the "Alley Dance" from the film My Sister Eileen (originally danced by Fosse himself).

In May 2023, it was announced that the production would close on May 14, 2023 due to declining sales and being completely shut out of the 2023 Tony Awards.

== Song list ==
=== Act 1 ===
Opening

- Prologue (Hot August Night) - Music and Lyrics by Neil Diamond, as adapted by Lee Holdridge
- Crunchy Granola Suite - Music and Lyrics by Neil Diamond

Recollections of an Old Dancer

- Mr. Bojangles - Music and Lyrics by Jerry Jeff Walker

The Dream Barre

- Chaconne - Music by Johann Sebastian Bach

Percussion

- Part I
- Part II
- Part III
- Part IV - Ionisation - Music by Edgard Varèse

=== Act 2 ===
Dancin' Man

- I Wanna Be a Dancin' Man (from the film The Belle of New York - Music by Johnny Mercer, Music by Harry Warren

Three In One

- Big Noise from Winnetka - Music by Bob Haggart, Ray Bauduc, Gil Rodin, and Bob Crosby

Joint Endeavor

- If It Feels Good, Let It Ride - Music and Lyrics by Carole Bayer Sager and Melissa Manchester
- Easy - Music and Lyrics by Carole Bayer Sager and Melissa Manchester

A Manic Depressive's Lament

- I've Got Them Feelin' Too Good Today Blues - Music and Lyrics by Jerry Leiber and Mike Stoller

Fourteen Feet

- Was Dog a Doughnut - Music by Cat Stevens and an uncredited Bruce Lynch and Jean Rouselle

=== Act 3 ===
Benny's Number

- Sing Sing Sing - Music by Louis Prima

The Female Star Spot

- Here You Come Again - Music and Lyrics by Barry Mann and Cynthia Weil

America

- Gary Owen
- Yankee Doodle Dandy - Music and Lyrics by George M. Cohan
- Stout Hearted Men (from The New Moon) - Lyrics by Oscar Hammerstein II, Music by Sigmund Romberg
- Under the Double Eagle
- Dixie
- When Johnny Comes Marching Home
- Rally Round the Flag
- Pack Up Your Troubles in Your Old Kit Bag and Smile, Smile, Smile - Lyrics by George Asaf, Music by Felix Powell
- The Stars and Stripes Forever - Music by John Philip Sousa
- Yankee Doodle Disco

Improvisation

- Dancin' - Music by Ralph Burns

=== Act 1 ===
Opening

- Prologue
- Crunchy Granola Suite

Recollections of an Old Dancer

- Mr. Bojangles

Percussion

- Part I
- Part II
- Part III
- Part IV ("Ionisation")

Three In One

- Big Noise from Winnetka

Big City Mime

- Introduction to the Big City/Big City Mime Theme
- Big Spender
- I Gotcha
- The Bookstore
- Backstreet Rivalry
- Pompeii Club
- Massage Parlor
- Snake Dance
- Let Me Entertain You
- Spring Chicken
- Epilogue

Dancin' Man

=== Act 2 ===
Benny's Number

- Sing Sing Sing

The Female Star Spot

- Here You Come Again

Romantic Fantasy

Joint Endeavors

- If It Feels Good (Let It Ride)
- Easy

America

- Rally Round the Flag
- Yankee Doodle Dandy
- When Johnny Comes Marching Home
- Gary Owen
- The Stars and Stripes Forever
- America Finale

No Good Reason At All

Intro to Big Deal

Big Deal

- Life is Just a Bowl of Cherries
- Ain't We Got Fun
- Beat Me Daddy, Eight to the Bar
- Epilogue
- Coda

== Broadway cast members ==
=== 1978 original Broadway cast ===
- Gail Benedict
- Sandahl Bergman
- Karen G. Burke
- René Ceballos
- Christopher Chadman
- Wayne Cilento
- Christine Colby
- Jill Cook
- Gregory B. Drotar
- Vicki Frederick
- Linda Haberman
- Richard Korthaze
- Edward Love
- John Mineo
- Ann Reinking
- Blane Savage
- Charles Ward
- William Whitener

=== 2023 Broadway revival cast ===
- Ioana Alfonso
- Yeman Brown
- Peter John Chursin
- Dylis Croman
- Jovan Dansberry
- Karli Dinardo
- Tony d'Alelio
- Aydin Eyikan
- Pedro Garza
- Jacob Guzman
- Manuel Herrera
- Afra Hines
- Gabriel Hyman
- Kolton Krouse
- Mattie Love
- Krystal Mackie
- Yani Marin
- Nando Morland
- Khori Michelle Petinaud
- Ida Saki
- Ron Todorowski
- Neka Zang

== Critical reception ==
In his The New York Times review, Richard Eder writes the show is designed to be a musical show — there is no story line. He states that Ann Reinking is clearly the star and she is at her best in the high point of the evening, "Benny's Number", which recreates Benny Goodman and his band using "Sing, Sing, Sing". He also mentions several other dances, such as "Dancin' Man", with the entire cast dressed in "ice-cream" suits and lavender shirts; and "Fourteen Feet", where the shoes are nailed to the floor, and the dancers proceed to move within those confines. He sums up by writing "precision and style mark the evening at its best", but they serve very little.

Clive Barnes, newly moved to the New York Post, told Fosse that he thought the show was "tremendous" and "fantastic".

The 2022 pre-Broadway production was praised in The San Diego Union-Tribune, which called it "a spectacular production of sight and sound. And most of all, dancin'." On March 19, 2023, an overall favorable review of the revived musical was reported in The New York Times stating (in alignment with Fosse's dance style), that in this newly updated musical, "A wiggle is worth a thousand words".

== Awards and nominations ==
=== Original Broadway production ===
Year	Award	Category	Nominee	Result
1978	Tony Award	Best Musical		Nominated
1978	Tony Award	Best Performance by a Featured Actor in a Musical	Wayne Cilento	Nominated
1978	Tony Award	Best Performance by a Featured Actress in a Musical	Ann Reinking	Nominated
1978	Tony Award	Best Direction of a Musical	Bob Fosse	Nominated
1978	Tony Award	Best Choreography	Bob Fosse	Won
1978	Tony Award	Best Costume Design	Willa Kim	Nominated
1978	Tony Award	Best Lighting Design	Jules Fisher	Won
1978	Drama Desk Award	Outstanding Musical		Nominated
1978	Drama Desk Award	Outstanding Featured Actor in a Musical	Charles Ward	Nominated
1978	Drama Desk Award	Outstanding Choreography	Bob Fosse	Won
1978	Drama Desk Award	Outstanding Lighting Design	Jules Fisher	Won

=== 2023 Broadway revival ===
Year	Award	Category	Nominee	Result
2023	Drama League Awards	Outstanding Revival of a Musical		Nominated
2023	Drama Desk Awards	Outstanding Lighting Design of a Musical	David Grill	Nominated
2023	Chita Rivera Awards	Outstanding Dancer in a Broadway Show	Peter John Chursin	Nominated
2023	Chita Rivera Awards	Outstanding Dancer in a Broadway Show	Dylis Croman	Nominated
2023	Chita Rivera Awards	Outstanding Dancer in a Broadway Show	Jacob Guzman	Nominated
2023	Chita Rivera Awards	Outstanding Dancer in a Broadway Show	Kolton Krouse	Nominated
2023	Chita Rivera Awards	Outstanding Dancer in a Broadway Show	Mattie Love	Won
2023	Chita Rivera Awards	Outstanding Dancer in a Broadway Show	Khori Michelle Petinaud	Nominated
2023	Chita Rivera Awards	Outstanding Ensemble in a Broadway Show		Won
