= Phil Friedman =

American stage manager (1921–1988)

Phil Friedman (born Philburn Friedman; October 31, 1921 – March 21, 1988) was an American stage manager and production manager who worked on Broadway for over 40 years. His career included the original productions of How to Succeed in Business Without Really Trying, Pippin, and Chicago.

== Early life ==
Philburn Friedman was born on Halloween, October 31, 1921, in Tacoma, Washington to Harry and Dorothy Friedman.

== Career ==
Phil Friedman began his career on Broadway as a production assistant in 1947 for The Story of Mary Surrat. He continued working and made his debut as a stage manager on Three Wishes for Jamie in 1952. His first popular musical was 1953's Kismet.

In 1961, he worked as the original production stage manager of How to Succeed in Business Without Really Trying, eventually becoming the production supervisor. He stage managed a total of 25 shows on Broadway.

Friedman worked on 11 shows with Bob Fosse. These included the revival of Pippin, Dancin', and Sweet Charity. He also starred in Fosse's film All That Jazz as the stage manager.

== Legacy ==
In 1986, Friedman was awarded the inaugural Del Hughes' Award for Excellence in Stage Management.

Phil Friedman's extensive production files are available at The Museum of the City of New York's theatre collection. Other examples of his files are available at the New York Public Library for Performing Arts. The files include scripts, prompt books, ground plans, and personal correspondence with many stars including Liza Minnelli, Michael Kidd, and Gwen Verdon.

His sister, Annette Trubowitsch, wrote his biography entitled Back Stages with the Production Manager: The Biography of Philburn Friedman. The book is currently out of print.

He taught stage management at Rutgers University.

== Death ==
Phil Friedman died at his home on March 21, 1988, of an apparent heart attack at 66 years old.
