= Broadway Theatre Project =

Training program in musical theatre in the campus of the University of South Florida

The Broadway Theatre Project (BTP), or the Broadway Theater Project, is a training program in musical theatre for high school and college-aged students held on the campus of the University of South Florida, in Tampa, Florida, U.S.. It was founded by the Tony Award-winner Ann Reinking, under the name The Musical Theatre Project of Tampa.

== History and about ==
Students accepted into the program are referred to as "apprentices" and are divided into groups reflecting their dance experience, vocal/acting experience and age for more individualized training. Programs offered include acting, voice, and dance.

Classes are taken every day of the project, typically from 8:30am to 5:00pm with an hour lunch break, and block rehearsals for numbers within the final showcase are from 6:00pm to 10:00pm. Students not in block rehearsal continue with group classes for that time period.

Throughout the project, guest artists often visit to have a question-and-answer session with apprentices and usually give a master class during the day to share their knowledge of the industry. Guest artists have included Terrence Mann, Ashley Brown (former apprentice), Charlotte d'Amboise, Ben Vereen, Gregory Hines, Savion Glover, Julie Andrews, Patrick Wilson (former apprentice), Phylicia Rashad, Stanley Donen, Frank Wildhorn, Neil Patrick Harris, Jonathan Groff and Tommy Tune.

Students are housed in suite-style dormitories for the length of the project and are not permitted to leave. The project concludes with a Broadway-themed revue at The Tampa Bay Performing Arts Center. The performances are notorious for being presented minimalistically, as students dress completely in black and perform on a bare stage with a cyclorama.
