= Susan Browning =

American actress

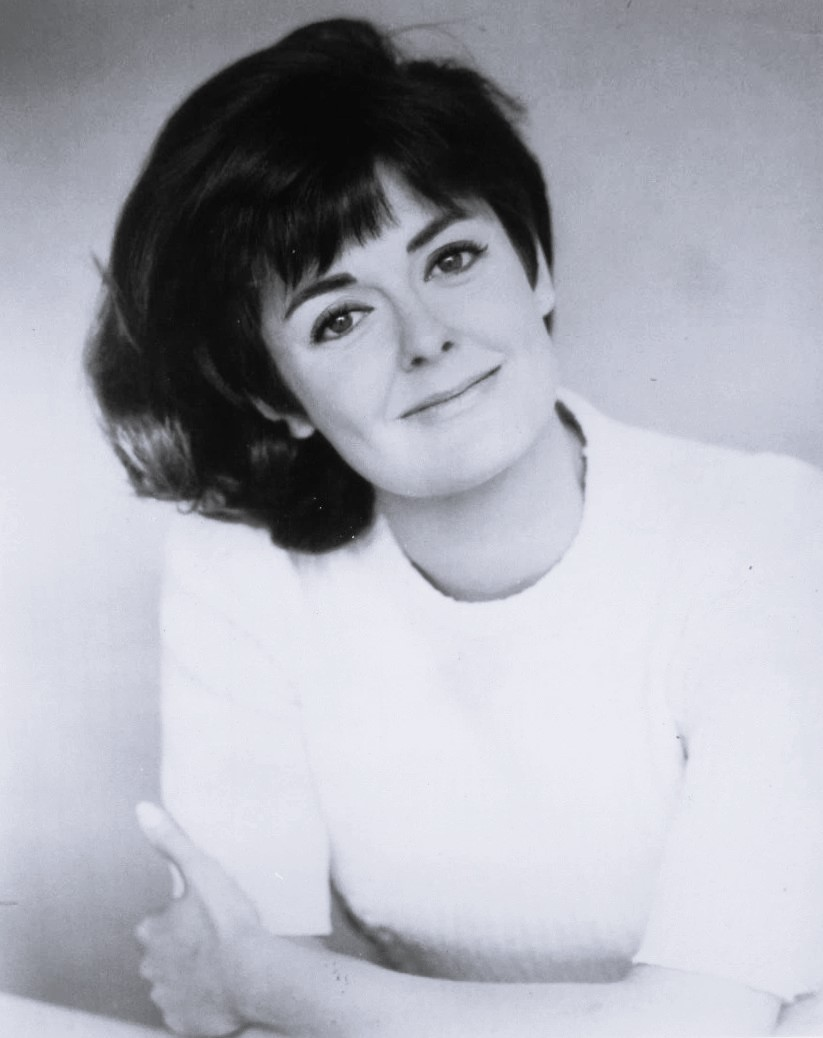
- Browning as Faye Medwick in Chapter Two (1979)
- Born: Susan Brown; February 25, 1941; Baldwin, New York, U.S.
- Died: April 23, 2006 (aged 65); New York City, U.S.
- Education: Penn State University
- Occupation: Actress
- Years active: 1963–1995

Susan Browning (born Susan Brown; February 25, 1941 – April 23, 2006) was an American actress and singer, known for performing in the Broadway musicals Shelter, Company, Big River, and Goodtime Charley.

== Early years ==
Browning was born Susan Brown in Baldwin, New York, and graduated from Baldwin High School in 1958. She attended Penn State University where she was a member of Kappa Alpha Theta and graduated with a bachelor's degree in theater arts in 1962. She changed her last name to differentiate herself from another actress named Susan Brown.

== Career ==
After Browning finished college, she acted with the Equity Library Theatre. Impresario Julius Monk saw her in a musical production there and signed her for a revue, Dime a Dozen, at Plaza 9. She was in that show for a year and left to make her debut on Broadway in Love and Kisses.

Browning was nominated for two Tony Awards: for Best Actress in a Musical for Company in 1971 and for Best Featured Actress in a Musical for Goodtime Charley in 1975. She was also featured on Broadway in the musicals Big River and Shelter, as well as several plays.

Browning played one of the nuns in the 1992 movie Sister Act, as well as its 1993 sequel Sister Act 2: Back in the Habit. Her television work included appearances on Love Is a Many Splendored Thing, Law & Order, All My Children, Mary Hartman, Mary Hartman, The Monkees, The Girl From U.N.C.L.E., and The Wild Wild West.

== Death ==
Browning died on April 23, 2006, in New York City after a brief illness, according to friends in the theatre community. She was 65 years old.

== Filmography ==
Year	Title	Role	Notes
1966	Texas Across the River	Bridesmaid	Uncredited
1982	The World According to Garp	Midge Percy	
1986	The Money Pit	Samantha	
1992	Sister Act	Choir Nun #8	
1993	Sister Act 2: Back in the Habit	Choir Nun #8	
1995	Sabrina	Secretary	(final film role)

== Television ==
Year	Title	Role	Notes
1967	The Monkees	Ellen	S1:E28, "Monkees on the Line"
