= Gary J. Brink =

American set decorator

- Other name: Gary Brink
- Occupation: Set decorator
- Years active: 1977 - 1999

Gary J. Brink is an American set decorator. He won an Oscar in the category Best Art Direction for the film All That Jazz.

== Selected filmography ==
- All That Jazz (1979)
