= The Big Goodbye: Chinatown and the Last Years of Hollywood =

- Author: Sam Wasson
- Language: English
- Genre: Nonfiction
- Published: 2020
- Publisher: Faber & Faber
- Publication place: United States
- ISBN: 0571347630

The Big Goodbye: Chinatown and the Last Years of Hollywood is a 2020 nonfiction book written by Sam Wasson.

== Synopsis ==
The true story of the making of the film Chinatown.

== Critical reception ==
The Los Angeles Times wrote "Sam Wasson's fascinating and page-turning description of the talent and ideas behind 'Chinatown' is more than a mere biography of a landmark movie; it aims to flesh out the wild and woolly era that incubated it, roughly the late 1960s to the late 1970s, and in this it mostly succeeds."

PopMatters said "The Big Goodbye is a graceful and worthwhile elegy to a time dear to those who are lucky enough to remember it."
