= Rouben Ter-Arutunian =

Georgian-born Armenian-American stage designer (1920–1992)

- Ռուբէն Տէր-Յարութիւնեան
- Born: July 24, 1920; Tiflis, Georgian SSR
- Died: October 17, 1992 (aged 72); New York City, U.S.
- Education: Reimann School, 1939–1940; Humboldt University of Berlin, 1941–1943; Berlin University of the Arts, 1941–1943; University of Vienna, 1943–1944
- Occupations: Costume designer; set designer
- Years active: 1940–1980
- Awards: Tony Award for Best Costume Design, 1959

Rouben Ter-Arutunian (Armenian: Ռուբէն Տէր-Յարութիւնեան; July 24, 1920 – October 17, 1992) was a Georgian-born Armenian-American costume and set designer, known for his association with the New York City Ballet.

== Early life and education ==
Rouben Ter-Arutunian was born in Tiflis, Georgian SSR (present-day Tbilisi, Georgia) to an Armenian family. Sometime in the 1920s the Ter-Arutunian family moved to Paris, before later moving to Berlin in 1927.

Ter-Arutunian studied art and design at the Reimann School from 1939–1941. Ter-Arutunian studied at Humboldt University of Berlin and the Berlin University of the Arts during 1941–1943, before continuing his music studies at the University of Vienna during 1943–1944.

== Career ==
Ter-Arutunian first designed costumes for dancers of the Berlin Staatsoper in 1940, going on to design for the Dresden Opera and the Vienna State Opera.

In 1947, Ter-Arutunian moved to Paris.

=== New York ===
He moved to New York in 1951, which started his twenty-five year association with George Balanchine and New York City Ballet. In 1964 he designed the sets for the New York City Ballet production of The Nutcracker. He worked with the New York City Opera company, Hamburg State Opera, La Scala in Milan, the Opera-Comique in Paris and the Spoleto Festival in Italy.

He designed either costumes or sets, sometimes both, for 24 Broadway productions. His first production on Broadway was Measure for Measure in 1957, and his last was Goodbye Fidel in 1980.

== Awards and legacy ==
He won the 1959 Tony Award for Best Costume Design for the musical Redhead, and was nominated for the Tony Award three times for Scenic Design and one other Tony for Costume Design.

The Rouben Ter-Arutunian Design Portfolios and the Rouben Ter-Arutunian Papers are held by the New York Public Library for the Performing Arts.

== Broadway work (selected) ==
- Measure for Measure (1957)
- Redhead (1959) — Tony Award for Best Costume Design
- Advise and Consent (1961) — Tony Award Best Scenic Design (Dramatic) (nominee)
- A Passage to India (1962) — Tony Award Best Scenic Design (nominee)
- The Resistible Rise of Arturo Ui (1964) — Tony Award Best Costume Design (nominee)
- Goodtime Charley (1975) — Tony Award Best Scenic Design (nominee)
- Goodbye Fidel (1980)
