= Goodtime Charley =

Musical

- Original Recording
- Music: Larry Grossman
- Lyrics: Hal Hackady
- Book: Sidney Michaels
- Basis: Historical events surrounding the Dauphin of France
- Productions: 1975 Broadway; 2008 Off-Broadway concert

Goodtime Charley is a musical with a book by Sidney Michaels, music by Larry Grossman, and lyrics by Hal Hackady.

A humorous take on actual historical events, it focuses on the Dauphin of France, who evolves from a hedonistic young man enamored of women in general (and Joan of Arc in particular) into a regal king while Joan follows her voices to her tragic fate.

== Background ==
The show was originally announced under the title "Charley and Joan", with Al Pacino and Barbara Harris as the intended leads. It underwent extensive changes throughout its development stage, especially when Joel Grey expressed interest in playing the lead. The script and score were rewritten significantly in order to tailor the piece to his personality and talents. The producers were so keen on casting Ann Reinking as Joan they put everything on hold while she recovered from a back injury she had sustained while performing in Over Here!. The delay would prove to be damaging, since Grey had been signed for the film Buffalo Bill and the Indians and had limited time to commit to the stage project.

== Synopsis ==
Set in 15th Century France, the main character is Charles the Dauphin, the bastard son of Queen Isabella and a dissolute ne'er-do-well. This so-called "Goodtime Charley" meets his match in the Maid of Orleans, Joan of Arc. With her prodding and inspiration, "Goodtime Charley" grows from a fun-loving woman-chaser into Charles the VII, King of France, while Joan follows her voices to a greater fate as martyr and saint.

== Original cast and characters ==
Character	Broadway (1975)
Dauphin of France	Joel Grey
Joan of Arc	Ann Reinking
Agnès Sorel	Susan Browning
The General	Louis Zorich
Minguet	Richard B. Shull
The Archbishop	Jay Garner
Isabeau of Bavaria	Grace Keagy
Yolande	Peggy Cooper
Charles VI of France	Hal Norman

== Song list ==
Act I

- History
- Goodtime Charley
- Voices & Visions
- Bits and Pieces
- To Make the Boy a Man
- Why Can't We All Be Nice?
- Born Lover
- I Am Going to Love
- Castles of the Loire
- Coronation

Act II

- You Still Have a Long Way to Go
- Merci, Bon Dieu
- Confessional
- One Little Year
- I Leave the World

An original cast recording was released by RCA.

== Productions ==
The out-of-town tryout in Boston resulted in major cuts in order to trim the running time from three-and-a-half hours to a more reasonable ninety minutes before the show continued to Philadelphia, where the reviews were now "raves", and finally New York City.

The musical opened on Broadway on March 3, 1975 at the Palace Theatre, where it ran for only 104 performances and twelve previews, closing on May 31 when the producers were unable to find a name star to replace the departing Grey. The director was Peter H. Hunt, original choreography and staging concepts, Dennis Nahat (who brought in designers Willa Kim and Rouben Ter-Arutunian), replaced after Philadelphia by choreographer Onna White, with scenic design by Rouben Ter-Arutunian, costume design by Willa Kim, lighting design by Feder and orchestrations by Jonathan Tunick.

42nd Street Moon, San Francisco, California, presented a staged concert version in its "Lost Musicals" series from June 5 to 23, 1996. This version, in consultation with Grossman and Hackady, restored three songs that were cut prior to the Broadway premiere: "All She Can Do is Say No", "Tomorrow's Good Old Days", and "There Goes the Country" and returned the show to its original concept.

A New York City revival, starring Daniel Reichard, was presented at the Arclight Theatre in September 2001.

The York Theatre Company (New York) "Musicals in Mufti" series presented the musical as a staged concert from June 27, 2008 to June 29, featuring Jenn Colella (Joan) and Matt McGrath (Charley). The Beautiful Soup Theatre Collective in New York presented it as a benefit reading in March 2012.

== Awards and nominations ==
=== Original Broadway production ===
Year	Award	Category	Nominee	Result
1975	Tony Award	Best Performance by a Leading Actor in a Musical	Joel Grey	Nominated
1975	Tony Award	Best Performance by a Leading Actress in a Musical	Ann Reinking	Nominated
1975	Tony Award	Best Performance by a Featured Actor in a Musical	Richard B. Shull	Nominated
1975	Tony Award	Best Performance by a Featured Actress in a Musical	Susan Browning	Nominated
1975	Tony Award	Best Scenic Design	Rouben Ter-Arutunian	Nominated
1975	Tony Award	Best Costume Design	Willa Kim	Nominated
1975	Tony Award	Best Lighting Design	Abe Feder	Nominated
1975	Drama Desk Award	Outstanding Musical		Nominated
1975	Drama Desk Award	Outstanding Actor in a Musical	Joel Grey	Nominated
1975	Drama Desk Award	Outstanding Actress in a Musical	Ann Reinking	Nominated
1975	Drama Desk Award	Outstanding Featured Actor in a Musical	Richard B. Shull	Nominated
1975	Drama Desk Award	Outstanding Director of a Musical	Peter H. Hunt	Nominated
1975	Drama Desk Award	Outstanding Costume Design	Willa Kim	Nominated
1975	Drama Desk Award	Outstanding Lighting Design	Abe Feder	Nominated
