= Redhead (original Broadway cast recording) =

Cast recording by various artists
- Released: 1959
- Recorded: 1959
- Genre: Show tunes
- Label: RCA Victor

Redhead, subtitled An Original Cast Recording, is an album containing a recording of the 1959 Broadway musical Redhead made by its original cast. The album was released by RCA Victor on February 13, 1959, eight days after the Broadway premiere.

== Critical reception ==
Professional ratings
Review scores
Source	Rating
Billboard	(positive)
AllMusic	2/5 stars

Billboard chose the album as one of its "Spotlight winners of the week" for the issue dated February 23, 1959. The reviewer started off by noting that the musical "received smash reviews from the critics and has settled down for what promises to be a long run" and concluded: "This should be a big one."

In his retrospective review for AllMusic, William Ruhlmann gave the album 2 stars out of 5, writing: "Redhead is [...] a show that was a success when it opened in 1959, but has been largely forgotten since. [...] The cast album reveals that, despite the singers' determination, it simply does not have a memorable score, and the attempted British accents don't help, either."

== Chart performance ==
The monophotic version of the album debuted at number 47 on the mono half of Billboard's Top LPs chart for the week ending May 31, 1959.

== Track listing ==
LP – RCA Victor LOC-1048 (mono), LSO-1048 (stereo)

All lyrics are written by Dorothy Fields; all music is composed by Albert Hague.

Side 1
No.	Title	Artist(s)	Length
1.	"Overture"	Orchestra
2.	"The Simpson Sisters' Door"	Patrons
3.	"The Right Finger of My Left Hand"	Gwen Verdon
4.	"Just for Once"	Gwen Verdon, Richard Kiley, Leonard Stone
5.	"Merely Marvelous"	Gwen Verdon
6.	"The Uncle Sam Rag"	Leonard Stone, singers and dancers
7.	"Erbie Fitch's Twitch"	Gwen Verdon
8.	"She's Just Not Enough Woman for Me"	Richard Kiley, Leonard Stone
9.	"Behave Yourself"	Gwen Verdon, Cynthia Latham, Doris Rich

Side 2
No.	Title	Artist(s)	Length
1.	"Look Who's in Love"	Gwen Verdon, Richard Kiley
2.	"My Girl Is Just Enough Woman for Me"	Richard Kiley and passersby
3.	"Essie's Vision"	Orchestra
4.	"Two Faces in the Dark"	Bob Dixon and singers
5.	"I'm Back in Circulation"	Richard Kiley
6.	"We Loves Ya, Jimey"	Joy Nichols, Pat Ferrier
7.	"Pick-Pocket Tango"	Orchestra
8.	"I'll Try"	Gwen Verdon, Richard Kiley, clientele of the Green Dragon
9.	"Chase and Finale"	Entire company

- Orchestra directed by Jay Blackton

== Awards ==
Year	Award type	Categories	Results	Ref.
1960	Grammy Awards	Best Broadway Show Album	Won	
