= Sam Wasson =

American film historian (born 1981)

- Born: 1981 (age 44–45); Los Angeles, California, United States
- Occupations: Author, publisher
- Writing career
- Notable works: Fosse; Improv Nation; The Big Goodbye; Hollywood: The Oral History
- Website: www.samwasson.com

Sam Wasson (born 1981) is an American author and publisher, who often writes about the history of cinema in Hollywood. His works include the biography Fosse, the history books Improv Nation: How We Made a Great American Art and The Big Goodbye: Chinatown and the Last Years of Hollywood and the co-authored Hollywood: The Oral History.

== Early life and education ==
Wasson was born in Los Angeles. His maternal grandfather was former Variety executive Hal "Lew" Scott. Wasson attended Wesleyan University, and USC School of Cinematic Arts.

== Career ==
During the writing of his Bob Fosse biography, Wasson and researcher Jane Klein unearthed lost footage of Fosse's 1961 ABC television show Seasons of Youth. In 2014, Fosse was one of six books shortlisted for the $10,000 Marfield Prize, and received the Special Jury Prize at the George Freedley Memorial Award. Production rights for a limited television series based on the book were purchased by television channel FX in 2018.

In 2020, Wasson published a book about the making of the 1974 movie Chinatown, titled The Big Goodbye: Chinatown and the Last Years of Hollywood. Later that year, a film adaptation of The Big Goodbye was announced, with Lorne Michaels attached as producer and Ben Affleck as director. Also in 2020, Wasson co-founded a publishing house with producer Brandon Millan.

Wasson was a visiting professor at Wesleyan University and Emerson College.

In 2021, Wasson and William Rempel filed a lawsuit to unseal a 2010 deposition transcript of Roger Gunson, a former deputy district attorney, in relation to the Roman Polanski sexual abuse case. In July 2022, the court ruled for the transcripts to be unsealed.

In 2022, Wasson and Jeanine Basinger wrote an oral history book titled Hollywood: The Oral History.

Wasson published a biography of Frank Capra in 2026.

== Bibliography ==
=== Books ===
- A Splurch in the Kisser: The Movies of Blake Edwards. Wesleyan University Press. 2006. ISBN 978-0-8195-6977-6.
- Fifth Avenue, 5 A.M.: Audrey Hepburn, Breakfast at Tiffany's, and the Dawn of the Modern Woman. HarperCollins. 2010. ISBN 978-0-0620-0013-2.
- Paul on Mazursky. Wesleyan University Press. 2011. ISBN 978-0-8195-7144-1.
- Fosse. Houghton Mifflin Harcourt. 2013. ISBN 978-0-5475-5329-0.
- Improv Nation: How We Made a Great American Art. Houghton Mifflin Harcourt. 2017. ISBN 978-0-5445-5720-8.
- The Big Goodbye: Chinatown and the Last Years of Hollywood. Flatiron Books. 2019. ISBN 978-1-2502-6629-3.
- with Janine Basinger (2022). Hollywood: The Oral History. HarperCollins. ISBN 978-0-0630-5696-1.
- Frank Capra: A Life. Harper. 2026. ISBN 978-0063291133.
