= Redhead (musical) =

- Logo
- Music: Albert Hague
- Lyrics: Dorothy Fields
- Book: Dorothy Fields; Herbert Fields; Sidney Sheldon; David Shaw
- Productions: 1959 Broadway
- Awards: Tony Award for Best Musical

Redhead is a musical with music composed by Albert Hague and lyrics by Dorothy Fields, who with her brother, Herbert, along with Sidney Sheldon and David Shaw wrote the book/libretto. Set in London in the 1880s, around the time of Jack the Ripper, the musical is a murder mystery in the setting of a wax museum.

== Background ==
Herbert and Dorothy Fields wrote the musical, then titled The Works for Beatrice Lillie. When Sidney Sheldon joined the writing team, it was rewritten for Gwen Verdon, who just had two smash hits on Broadway (Damn Yankees and New Girl in Town). Verdon took the lead on the condition that Bob Fosse would be the director as well as choreographer, making this his debut as a director. According to Stanley Green, Verdon was at the time contracted with producers Robert Fryer and Lawrence Carr to appear in a musical written by David Shaw. The producers resolved this conflict by producing Redhead and bringing Shaw in as one of the writers.

Redhead opened on Broadway at the 46th Street Theatre (now the Richard Rodgers Theatre) on February 5, 1959, and closed on March 19, 1960, after 452 performances. Bob Fosse directed and choreographed. Production design was by Rouben Ter-Arutunian and lighting design was by Jean Rosenthal. Orchestrations were by Philip J. Lang and Robert Russell Bennett under the musical direction of Jay Blackton.

The cast starred Verdon and Richard Kiley. The show won the Tony Award for Best Musical. The musical ran in a brief US tour after closing on Broadway, starring Verdon and Kiley. The tour started at the Shubert Theatre, Chicago in March 1960 and ended at the Curran Theatre, San Francisco, California, in June 1960.

== Synopsis ==
In Victorian London, the plain Essie Whimple works in the Simpson Sisters Wax Museum, run by her two aunts, Aunt Sarah and Aunt Maude. They show the murder of Ruth LaRue, an American chorus girl, at the museum. They are visited by the murdered women's co-workers and by Inspector White of Scotland Yard. Notable among them is Tom Baxter, a "Strong Man." Essie, attracted to Tom, makes up a story about knowing who the killer is, and fakes an attempt on her life. She hides in Tom's show, and is turned into a "Redhead."

== Original cast and characters ==
Character	Broadway (1959)	First National Tour (1960)
Essie Whimple	Gwen Verdon	Gwen Verdon
Tom Baxter	Richard Kiley	Richard Kiley
George Poppett	Leonard Stone	Leonard Stone
Sarah Simpson	Doris Rich	Doris Rich
Maude Simpson	Cynthia Latham	Cynthia Latham
Howard Cavanaugh	William LeMassena	William LeMassena
Inspector White	Ralph Sumpter	Ralph Sumpter
Charles Willingham	Patrick Horgan	Michael Sinclair
The Jailer	Buzz Miller	Bill Guske
Ruth La Rue / Tilly	Pat Ferrier	Pat Ferrier
May	Joy Nichols	Joy Nichols

== Songs ==
Act 1

- The Simpson Sisters – Singers and Dancers
- The Right Finger of My Left Hand – Essie Whimple
- Just for Once – Essie Whimple, Tom Baxter and George Poppett
- Merely Marvelous – Essie Whimple
- The Uncle Sam Rag – George Poppett, Singers and Dancers
- Erbie Fitch's Twitch – Essie Whimple
- She's Not Enough Woman for Me – Tom Baxter and George Poppett
- Behave Yourself – Essie Whimple, Maude Simpson, Sarah Simpson and Tom Baxter
- Look Who's in Love – Essie Whimple and Tom Baxter
- My Girl Is Just Enough Woman for Me – Tom Baxter and Passersby
- Essie's Vision – Essie Whimple and her Dream People
- Two Faces in the Dark – Essie Whimple, The Tenor, Singers and Dancers

Act II

- I'm Back in Circulation – Tom Baxter
- We Loves Ya, Jimey – Essie Whimple, May, Tilly and Clientele of the Green Dragon
- Pick-Pocket Tango – Essie Whimple and Jailer
- Look Who's in Love (Reprise) – Tom Baxter
- I'll Try – Essie Whimple and Tom Baxter
- Finale – Essie Whimple, Tom Baxter and Company

== Production history ==
One year after the Broadway premiere, a Spanish language adaptation was produced in Mexico City. La pelirroja was starred by the actress Vilma González and the actor Armando Calvo, featuring a young Plácido Domingo. The production opened in the Teatro de los Insurgentes on February 11, 1960.

The Costa Mesa Playhouse in Costa Mesa, California known for mounting lesser-known, unique, and obscure musicals, presented Redhead in June 1981. The musical revival group 42nd Street Moon in San Francisco, presented a staged concert of Redhead from September 2 to 20, 1998. The Goodspeed Opera House, Connecticut, presented the musical from September to December 1998. Directed by Christopher Ashley, the cast featured Valerie Wright as Essie, Timothy Warmen (Tom), Marilyn Cooper (Aunt Maude), and Carol Morley (Aunt Sarah).

In late January and early February 2015, "Theatre West" in Hollywood, California presented benefit concert performances of Redhead, featuring Lee Meriwether.

== Awards and nominations ==
=== Original Broadway production ===
Year	Award	Category	Nominee	Result
1959	Tony Awards	Best Musical		Won
1959	Tony Awards	Best Performance by a Leading Actor in a Musical	Richard Kiley	Won
1959	Tony Awards	Best Performance by a Leading Actress in a Musical	Gwen Verdon	Won
1959	Tony Awards	Best Performance by a Featured Actor in a Musical	Leonard Stone	Won
1959	Tony Awards	Best Choreography	Bob Fosse	Won
1959	Tony Awards	Best Conductor and Musical Director	Jay Blackton	Nominated
1959	Tony Awards	Best Costume Design	Rouben Ter-Arutunian	Won

The original cast album also tied with that of Gypsy: A Musical Fable for Best Broadway Show Album at the Grammy Awards for 1959 releases.

== Recordings ==
- Redhead: An Original Cast Recording (1959)
