= Jazz hands =

Hand position in performance dance

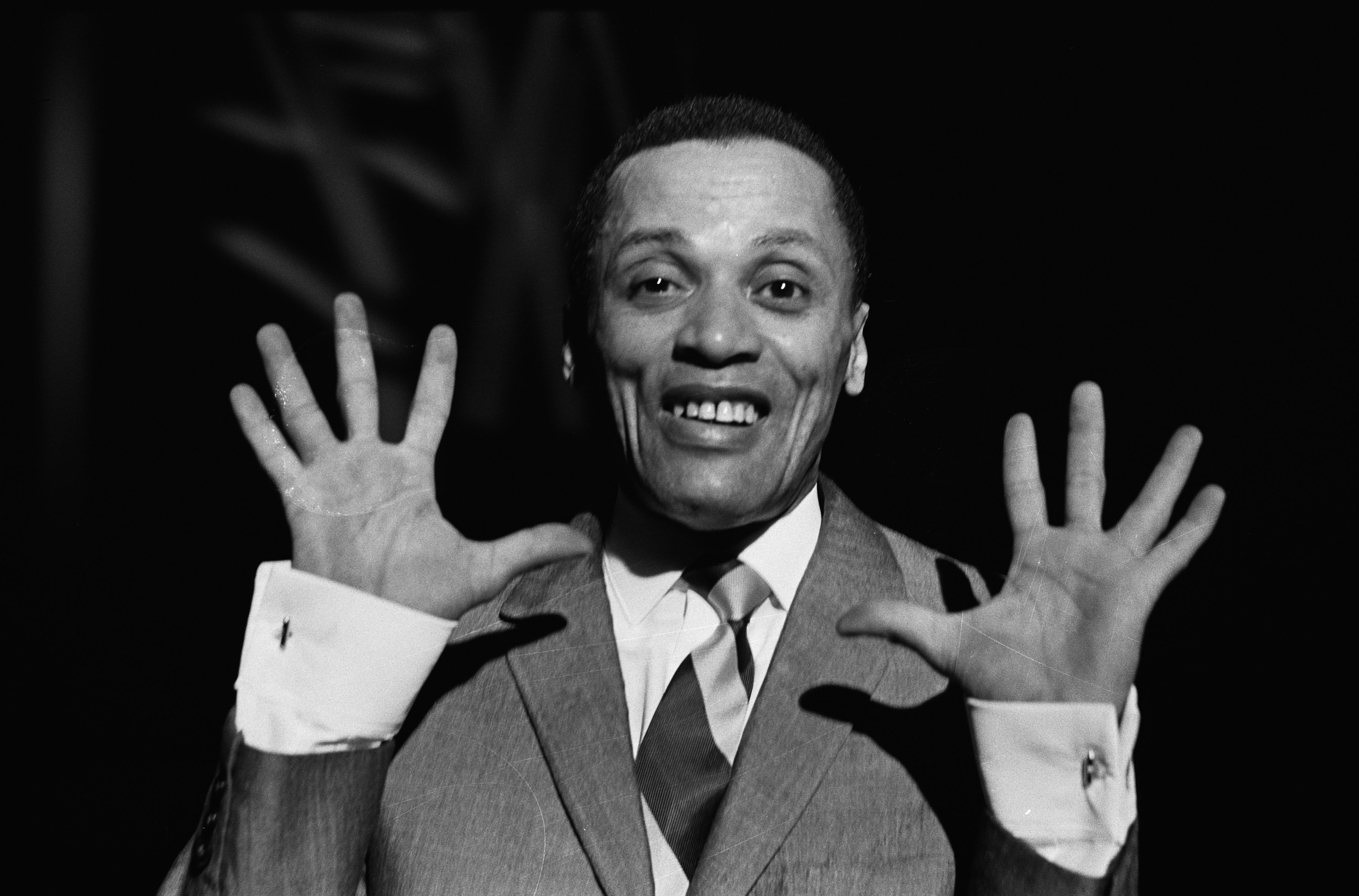
Dancer George Holmes performing jazz hands, 1963

Jazz hands in performance dance is the extension of a performer's hands with palms toward the audience and fingers splayed. This position is also referred to as webbing. It is commonly associated with especially exuberant types of performance such as musicals, cheerleading, show choir, revue, and especially jazz dance shows. In cheerleading, the position with arms outstretched and fingers wiggling up and down is sometimes referred to as spirit fingers or jazz fingers. Depending on the performance venue, both gestures can be associated with campiness.

One of the biggest proponents of jazz hands was Bob Fosse, who incorporated them in nearly all of his Broadway and film musical choreography. The best example of this is the opening musical number of Pippin, "Magic to Do", in which still, illuminated jazz hands are the first thing the audience sees.

== Description ==
In the basic jazz hands position, the hands are open, the palms face forward, and the fingers are splayed; in addition, sometimes the hands are shaken and the fingers are moving. The arm is often straight. Gus Giordano describes the position as the "palm of the hand facing forward with fingers stretched". Frank Hatchett instructs dancers to "spread fingers (jazz hands); face palms front".

Neither Gus Giordano nor Frank Hatchett include shaking the hands in their description of jazz hands, but a choreographer may specify that the hands are to be shaken; the motion is rapid and fluttering, as if jingling a tambourine.

== Sports ==
Cronulla-Sutherland Sharks fans became widely known for the 'Spirit Fingers', when someone has a place kick.
