= Big Deal (musical) =

- Playbill cover
- Music: various
- Lyrics: various
- Book: Bob Fosse
- Basis: Big Deal on Madonna Street
- Productions: 1986 Broadway

Big Deal is a musical with a book by Bob Fosse using songs from various composers such as Ray Henderson, Eubie Blake, and Jerome Kern. It was based on the 1958 film Big Deal on Madonna Street by Mario Monicelli. The musical received five Tony Award nominations, with Fosse winning for Choreography. The production was Fosse's final work, as he died the next year.

== Production and background ==
After shopping the project around to various composers (including Stephen Sondheim and Peter Allen), Fosse eventually settled on using popular songs of the 1920s and 30s. Fosse said that by using existing songs: "I can pick the perfect songs that will say the right things, and they're known. We'll have the greatest score in the world because they're all hit songs." Fosse said of the main character, Charley: "That's my part! A swaggering bumbler who thinks he's a ladies' man, and he's not."

Big Deal opened on Broadway at the Broadway Theatre on April 10, 1986, and closed on June 8, 1986, after 69 performances and six previews. Directed and choreographed by Fosse, with Christopher Chadman as associate choreographer, the musical featured Cleavant Derricks as Charley, Loretta Devine as Lilly, Alan Weeks as Willie, Wayne Cilento, Cady Huffman, Valarie Pettiford, and Stephanie Pope.

== Songs ==
Act 1

- "Life Is Just a Bowl of Cherries" – Lilly
  (Music and lyrics by Lew Brown and Ray Henderson)
- "For No Good Reason At All" – Narrators
  (Music and lyrics by Samuel M. Lewis, Abel Baer and Joseph Young)
- "Charley, My Boy" – Charley
  (Music and lyrics by Ted Fiorito and Gus Kahn)
- "I've Got a Feelin' You're Foolin'" – Kokomo, Charley, Judge and Narrators
  (Music and lyrics by Nacio Herb Brown and Arthur Freed)
- "Ain't We Got Fun?" – Prisoners
  (Lyrics by Kahn and Raymond B. Egan; music by Richard A. Whiting)
- "For No Good Reason At All" (Reprise) – Narrators and Dancers
  (Music and lyrics by Lewis, Baer and Young)
- "Chicago" – Narrators (Music and lyrics by Fred Fisher)
- "Pick Yourself Up" – Charley, Willie, Slick, Sunnyboy and Otis
  (Lyrics By Dorothy Fields; music By Jerome Kern)
- "I'm Just Wild About Harry" – Lilly
  (Music and lyrics by Eubie Blake and Noble Sissle)
- "Beat Me Daddy, Eight to the Bar" – Bandleader, Band and Dancers
  (Music and lyrics by Don Raye, Hughie Prince and Eleanor Sheehy)
- "The Music Goes 'Round and 'Round" – Bandleader and Band
  (Music and lyrics by Edward Farley, Red Hodgson and Michael Riley)
- "Life Is Just a Bowl of Cherries" (Reprise) – Lilly

Act II

- "Now's the Time to Fall in Love" – Narrators and Dancers
  (Music and lyrics by Al Sherman and Al Lewis)
- "Ain't She Sweet" – Sunnyboy, Phoebe, Narrators and Dancers
  (Lyrics by Jack Yellen; music by Milton Ager)
- "Everybody Loves My Baby" – Willie and Narrators
  (Music and lyrics by Jack Palmer and Spencer Williams)
- "Me and My Shadow" – Dancin' Dan and Shadows
  (Lyrics by Billy Rose, music by Al Jolson and Dave Dreyer)
- "Love Is Just Around the Corner" – Narrators
  (Lyrics by Leo Robin; music by Lewis E. Gensler))
- "Just a Gigolo" – Bandleader and Charley
  (Julius Brammer and English lyrics by Irving Caesar; music by Lionello Casucci)
- "Who's Your Little Who-zis?" – Bandleader and Band Singer
  (Lyrics by Walter Hirsch; music by Hal Goering and Ben Bernie)
- "Yes Sir, That's My Baby" – Charley
  (Lyrics by Kahn; music By Walter Donaldson)
- "Button Up Your Overcoat" – Lilly
  (Music and lyrics by Henderson, Brown and Bud G. DeSylva)
- "Daddy, You've Been a Mother to Me" – Willie and Little Willie
  (Music and lyrics by Fred Fisher)
- Hold Tight, Hold Tight" – Otis and Ladies (Music and lyrics by Leonard Ware, Willie Spottswood, Edward Robinson, Ben Smith and Sidney Bechet)
- "Happy Days Are Here Again" – Slick, Phoebe, Sunnyboy and Company
  (Lyrics by Jack Yellen; music by Milton Ager)
- "I'm Sitting On Top of the World" – Charley and Company
  (Music and lyrics by Henderson, Young and Samuel M. Lewis)
- "Life Is Just a Bowl of Cherries" (Reprise) – Lilly
  (Music and lyrics by Brown and Henderson)

== Synopsis ==
In Chicago in the 1930s a group of small-time unemployed African-American men plan to rob a pawn shop. Their leader, Charlie, is a former boxer. But the hapless would-be thieves run into many obstacles along the way.

== Critical reception ==
Frank Rich in his review for The New York Times wrote: "Big Deal, the new Fosse musical at the Broadway, contains exactly one of those show stoppers, and attention must be paid. If only for 10 minutes or so just before the end of Act I, Mr. Fosse makes an audience remember what is (and has been) missing from virtually every other musical in town. The number is set to the old song Beat Me Daddy Eight to the Bar, and it unfolds in a Chicago ballroom of the 1930s called (need I tell you?) Paradise...The disappointment of Big Deal is that even Mr. Fosse, one of the form's last magicians, can conjure up that joy so rarely. There are some other pleasurable passages in this musical - period songs (or snatches of them) agreeably sung or danced by talented performers - but this is a mostly lackluster effort that often seems to be lumbering clumsily about."

== Awards and nominations ==
=== Original Broadway production ===
Year	Award	Category	Nominee	Result
1986	Tony Award	Best Musical		Nominated
1986	Tony Award	Best Book of a Musical	Bob Fosse	Nominated
1986	Tony Award	Best Performance by a Leading Actor in a Musical	Cleavant Derricks	Nominated
1986	Tony Award	Best Direction of a Musical	Bob Fosse	Nominated
1986	Tony Award	Best Choreography	Bob Fosse	Won
1986	Drama Desk Award	Outstanding Musical		Nominated
1986	Drama Desk Award	Outstanding Actor in a Musical	Cleavant Derricks	Nominated
1986	Drama Desk Award	Outstanding Director of a Musical	Bob Fosse	Nominated
1986	Drama Desk Award	Outstanding Choreography	Bob Fosse	Won
