= Bob Fosse =

American choreographer, dancer, and director (1927–1987)

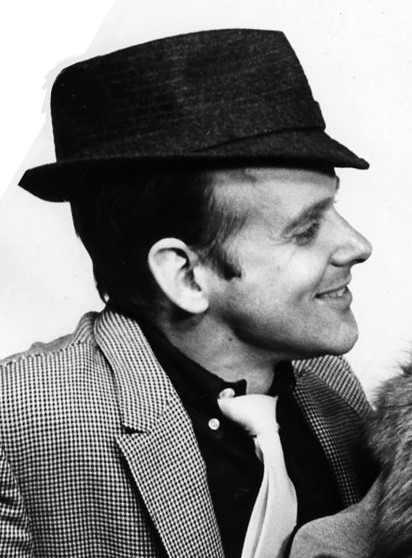
- Fosse in Pal Joey (1963)
- Born: Robert Louis Fosse; June 23, 1927; Chicago, Illinois, U.S.
- Died: September 23, 1987 (aged 60); Washington, D.C., U.S.
- Occupations: Choreographer; dancer; director; filmmaker; actor
- Years active: 1947–1987
- Spouses: Mary Ann Niles (m. 1947; div. 1951) Joan McCracken (m. 1952; div. 1959) Gwen Verdon (m. 1960)
- Partner: Ann Reinking (1972–1978)
- Children: Nicole Fosse

Robert Louis Fosse (/ˈfɒsi/; June 23, 1927 – September 23, 1987) was an American choreographer, dancer, actor, filmmaker, and stage director. He is known for his work on stage and screen, and was arguably the most influential figure in the field of jazz dance in the twentieth century. He received numerous accolades including an Academy Award, a BAFTA Award, three Primetime Emmy Awards, nine Tony Awards, and the Palme d'Or.

His career began as an actor in the musical productions Call Me Mister (1947), Billion Dollar Baby (1951), and Pal Joey (1952). He transitioned into directing and choreographing musical works, winning Tony Awards for choreographing The Pajama Game (1954), Damn Yankees (1955), Redhead (1959), Little Me (1963), Sweet Charity (1966), Pippin (1972), Dancin' (1978), and Big Deal (1986), and for directing Pippin. He worked on Bells Are Ringing (1956), New Girl in Town (1958), How to Succeed in Business Without Really Trying (1961), and Chicago (1975).

In film, he played Hortensio in the MGM musical Kiss Me Kate (1953) and his directorial debut was in the musical Sweet Charity (1969). He won the Academy Award for Best Director for the musical drama Cabaret (1972). He was Oscar-nominated for directing the dramas Lenny (1974) and All That Jazz (1979), the latter of which won the Palme d'Or at the Cannes Film Festival. He directed the concert film Liza with a Z (1972), which earned him the Primetime Emmy Award for Outstanding Directing for a Variety Special, and his final film is Star 80 (1983).

Fosse forged an uncompromising modern style, characterized by finger-snapping, tilted bowler hats, fishnet stockings, splayed gloved fingers, turned-in knees and toes, shoulder rolls, and jazz hands. His third wife was the actor–dancer Gwen Verdon, with whom he collaborated on several theater and film projects.

== Early life ==
Robert Louis Fosse was born in Uptown, Chicago, Illinois, on June 23, 1927, to Norwegian-American father Cyril Kingsley Fosse - a traveling salesman for Hershey - and Irish-American mother Sarah Alice "Sadie" (née Stanton) Fosse. He was the fifth of six children. He was named after the Scottish novelist Robert Louis Stevenson.

He was drawn to dance, and his parents supported his interest, enrolling him in formal dance lessons at the age of eight at the Chicago Academy of Theatre Arts, where he trained under Marguerite Comerford. When he was 13 years old, Fosse performed professionally in Chicago with Charles Grass as "The Riff Brothers". They toured vaudeville and movie houses in Chicago, as well as USO theaters and Eagles Clubs.

Many of these performances included shows at burlesque clubs such as the Silver Cloud and Cave of Winds. Fosse is quoted with saying, "I was sixteen years old, and I played the whole burlesque wheel." Much of the erotica he saw inspired his future work. In 1943, at the age of 15, Fosse choreographed his first dance number and earned his first full credit as a choreographer in a film, Hold Evry'thing! A Streamlined Extravaganza in Two Parts, which featured showgirls wearing strapless dresses and performing a fan dance, inspired by his time in burlesque houses.

After graduating from Amundsen High School in 1945, Fosse was recruited into the U.S. Navy toward the end of World War II at Naval Station Great Lakes, where he was sent to be prepared for combat. Fosse petitioned his manager, Frederick Weaver, to advocate on his behalf to his superiors after his own failed attempts to be placed in the Special Services Entertainment Division. Fosse was soon placed in the variety show Tough Situation, which toured military and naval bases in the Pacific Ocean.

== Career ==
=== 1947–1953: Contract with MGM ===
After his discharge, Fosse moved to New York City in 1947 with the ambition of being the new Fred Astaire. He began to study acting at the American Theatre Wing, where he met his first wife and dance partner, Mary Ann Niles (1923–1987). His first stage role was in Call Me Mister, along with Niles. In 1948 Tony Charmoli danced in Make Mine Manhattan but gave the part to Fosse when the show toured nationally. Charmoli also found Fosse work as a dancer on the TV shows he was working on when Fosse returned from the tour.

Fosse and Niles were regular performers on Your Hit Parade in its 1950–1951 season. Dean Martin and Jerry Lewis saw their act in New York's Pierre Hotel and scheduled the couple to appear on The Colgate Comedy Hour in 1951.

Fosse was signed to an MGM contract in 1953. His early screen appearances as a dancer included Give a Girl a Break, The Affairs of Dobie Gillis, and Kiss Me Kate, all released in 1953. Fosse's choreography of a short dance sequence during From This Moment On in Kiss Me Kate and his dance with Carol Haney brought him to the attention of Broadway producers. In Kiss Me Kate, Fosse starred alongside Howard Keel, Kathryn Grayson, and Ann Miller. Fosse played Hortensio within The Taming of the Shrew dance sequences.

=== 1954–1968: Choreographer ===
During the late 1940s and early 1950s, Fosse transitioned from film to theatre. Fosse told an interviewer, "Jerry [Jerome Robbins] started me doing choreography. He gave me my first job as a choreographer [Pajama Game] and I'm grateful for that."

In 1954, Fosse choreographed his first stage musical, The Pajama Game, followed by My Sister Eileen and George Abbott's Damn Yankees in 1955. It was during Damn Yankees when he first met rising star Gwen Verdon, whom he married in 1960. For her work in Damn Yankees in 1956 Verdon won her first Tony Award for Best Actress in a Musical. She had previously won a Tony for Best Performance by a Featured Actress in a Musical for Can-Can (1954). In 1957 Fosse choreographed New Girl in Town, also directed by Abbott, and Verdon won her second Tony Award for Best Actress in a Musical in 1958.

Also in 1957, Fosse choreographed the film version of The Pajama Game, starring Doris Day. The next year, Fosse appeared in and choreographed the film version of Damn Yankees, in which Verdon reprised her stage triumph as the character Lola. Fosse and Verdon were partners in the mambo number "Who's Got the Pain".

In 1959, Fosse directed and choreographed the stage musical Redhead. For his work on Redhead Fosse won the Tony Award for Best Choreography, while Verdon won her third Tony Award for Best Actress in a Musical. Redhead also won the Tony Award for Best Musical. Fosse's next feature was supposed to be the musical The Conquering Hero, based on a book by Larry Gelbart, but he was replaced as director/choreographer.

In 1961, Fosse choreographed the satirical Broadway musical How to Succeed in Business Without Really Trying, starring Robert Morse. The story revolves around an ambitious man, J. Pierrepont Finch (Morse), who, with the help of the book How to Succeed in Business Without Really Trying, rises from window washer to chairman of the board of the World Wide Wicket Company. The musical was an instant hit. In 1963 Fosse was nominated for two Tony Awards, Best Choreography and Best Direction of a Musical for Little Me, winning the former. He choreographed and directed Verdon in Sweet Charity in 1966.

=== 1969–1979: Film director ===
Fosse directed five feature films. His first, Sweet Charity (1969), starring Shirley MacLaine, is an adaptation of the Broadway musical he had directed and choreographed. In 1972, Fosse directed his second theatrical film, Cabaret, starring Liza Minnelli, Michael York, and Joel Grey. The film is based on the 1966 musical of the same name. In the traditional manner of musical theater, called an "integrated musical", every significant character in the stage version sings to express his or her own emotion and to advance the plot.

In the film version, the musical numbers are entirely diegetic. The film focuses on a romance between Sally Bowles (Minnelli), who performs at the Kit Kat Klub, and a young British idealist, Brian Roberts, played by York, set during the final days of Weimar Germany. It was an immediate success among audiences and critics alike, winning eight Academy Awards, including Best Director. Liza Minnelli and Joel Grey both won Oscars for their roles. In 1972, Fosse and Minnelli collaborated on the concert film Liza with a Z, earning Fosse an Emmy Award for both direction and choreography.

In 1973, Fosse's work on Pippin won him the Tony Award for Best Direction of a Musical. He was director and choreographer of Chicago in 1975, which starred Verdon. In 1974 Fosse directed Lenny, a biographical film about the controversial standup comedian Lenny Bruce, portrayed by Dustin Hoffman. Fosse was again nominated for Best Director; Hoffman also received a nomination for Best Actor. Fosse performed a number in Stanley Donen's 1974 film version of The Little Prince. According to AllMusic, "Bob Fosse stops the show with a slithery dance routine." In 1977 Fosse had a small role in the romantic comedy Thieves.

In 1979, Fosse co-wrote and directed a semi-autobiographical film, All That Jazz (1979), starring Roy Scheider, which portrayed the life of a womanizing, drug-addicted choreographer and director in the midst of triumph and failure. Ann Reinking appears in the film as the protagonist's lover, protégée, and domestic partner. All That Jazz won four Academy Awards, earning Fosse his third Oscar nomination for Best Director. It also won the Palme d'Or at the 1980 Cannes Film Festival. Vincent Canby of The New York Times described the film as "Mr. Fosse's answer to 8½ in which Federico Fellini wittily examined his own life at a point when he feared his creativity was at an end".

Writing for The New Yorker in 1974, Pauline Kael was fond of Fosse, mentioning that she didn't know of "any other director who entered moviemaking so late in life and developed such technical proficiency", going on to say that she found Fosse "a true prodigy."

=== 1980–1986: Final works ===
In 1983, Fosse's final film, Star 80, is a biographical movie, based on a Pulitzer Prize-winning article, about Dorothy Stratten, a Playboy Playmate who was murdered. The film was screened out of competition at the 34th Berlin International Film Festival. Critic Roger Ebert in his four-star review of the film wrote, "Although his Broadway musicals have been upbeat entertainments, he seems to see the movie camera as a device for peering into our shames and secrets...This is an important movie. Devastating, violent, hopeless, and important, because it holds a mirror up to a part of the world we live in and helps us see it more clearly."

In 1986, Fosse wrote, choreographed, and directed the Broadway production of Big Deal, which was nominated for five Tony awards, winning for Best Choreography, as well as five more for the revival of Sweet Charity at the nearby Minskoff Theater, winning a Tony Award for Best Revival. Fosse began work on a film about gossip columnist Walter Winchell that would have starred Robert De Niro. The Winchell script was written by Michael Herr. Fosse died before starting the project.

== Innovations ==
Distinctions of Fosse's style include the use of turned-in knees, the "Fosse Amoeba", sideways shuffling, rolled shoulders, and jazz hands. With Astaire as an influence, Fosse used props such as bowler hats, canes, and chairs. His trademark use of hats was also influenced by his own self-consciousness, according to Martin Gottfried in his biography of Fosse: "His baldness was the reason that he wore hats, and was doubtless why he put hats on his dancers." Fosse used gloves in his performances because he did not like his hands. Some of his most popular numbers include "Steam Heat" (The Pajama Game) and "Big Spender" (Sweet Charity). The "Rich Man's Frug" scene in Sweet Charity is another example of his signature style.

For Damn Yankees, Fosse was inspired by the "father of theatrical jazz dance", Jack Cole. In 1957 Verdon and Fosse studied with Sanford Meisner to develop a better acting technique. According to Michael Joosten, Fosse once said: "The time to sing is when your emotional level is too high to just speak anymore, and the time to dance is when your emotions are just too strong to only sing about how you 'feel.'"

In Redhead, Fosse used one of the first ballet sequences in a show that contained five different styles of dance: Fosse's jazz, a cancan, a gypsy dance, a march, and an old-fashioned English music hall number. During Pippin, Fosse made the first television commercial for a Broadway show.

== Personal life ==
=== Relationships ===
Fosse married dance partner Mary Ann Niles (1923–1987) on May 3, 1947, in Detroit. In 1952, a year after he divorced Niles, he married dancer Joan McCracken in New York City; they divorced in 1959.

His third wife was dancer and actress Gwen Verdon, whom he met choreographing Damn Yankees, in which she starred. In 1963 they had a daughter, Nicole Fosse, who later became a dancer and actress. Fosse's extramarital affairs put a strain on the marriage and by 1971 they were separated, although they remained legally married until his death in 1987. Verdon never remarried. During their joint career, Fosse would continually take blame from critics while Gwen Verdon would get praise, no matter how much influence Verdon had on a production. However, Verdon always looked out for him and the Fosse family image, hosting grandiose cast parties and being Fosse's personal press secretary throughout their marriage.

Fosse met dancer Ann Reinking during the run of Pippin in 1972. According to Reinking, their romantic relationship ended "toward the end of the run of Dancin'" (1978). Reinking acted in his musical drama film All That Jazz, which was loosely based on Fosse's life.

Fosse also dated actresses Jessica Lange and Dyan Cannon.

=== Illness and substance abuse ===
In 1961 Fosse's epilepsy was revealed when he had a seizure onstage during rehearsals for The Conquering Hero. Fosse's time outside of the rehearsal studio or theater was seldom spent alone. As stated in the biography Fosse by Sam Wasson, "nights alone were murder on Fosse". To alleviate loneliness and insomnia brought on by his prescribed amphetamines, Fosse would often contact dancers he would work with and try to date them, making it hard for many to refuse his advances, but also giving him the affirmation of success he sought.

=== Death ===
Fosse died of a heart attack on September 23, 1987, at George Washington University Hospital while the revival of Sweet Charity was opening at the nearby National Theatre. He had collapsed in Verdon's arms near the Willard Hotel. As he had requested, Verdon and Nicole Fosse scattered his ashes in the Atlantic Ocean off Quogue, Long Island, where Fosse had been living with his girlfriend of four years. A month after his death, Verdon fulfilled Fosse's request for his friends to "go out and have dinner on me" by hosting a star-studded, celebrity-filled evening at Tavern on the Green with Verdon, Reinking, Jessica Lange, Roy Scheider, Ben Vereen, and E. L. Doctorow attending.

== Stage credits ==
Year	Title	Functioned as			Role	Venue	Notes	Ref.
Year	Title	Director	Choreographer	Performer	Role	Venue	Notes	Ref.
1947	Call Me Mister	No	No	Yes	Chorus member	U.S. tour		
1948	Make Mine Manhattan	No	No	Yes	Ensemble member	U.S. tour		
1950	Dance Me a Song	No	No	Yes	Dancer	Royale Theatre, Broadway		
1951	Billion Dollar Baby	No	No	Yes	Champ Watson	Alvin Theatre, Broadway		
1952	Pal Joey	No	No	Yes	Joey Evans	Broadhurst Theatre, Broadway	Understudy	
1954	The Pajama Game	No	Yes	No	—N/a	Broadhurst Theatre, Broadway		
1955	Damn Yankees	No	Yes	No	—N/a	Adelphi Theatre, Broadway		
1956	Bells Are Ringing	No	Yes	No	—N/a	Alvin Theatre, Broadway		
1958	New Girl in Town	No	Yes	No	—N/a	46th Street Theatre, Broadway		
1959	Redhead	Yes	Yes	No	—N/a	46th Street Theatre, Broadway		
1961	The Conquering Hero	No	Yes	No	—N/a	ANTA Theatre, Broadway	Uncredited	
1961	How to Succeed in Business Without Really Trying	No	Yes	No	—N/a	46th Street Theatre, Broadway		
1962	Little Me	Yes	Yes	No	—N/a	Lunt-Fontanne Theatre, Broadway		
1963	Pal Joey	No	No	Yes	Joey Evans	New York City Center, Broadway		
1965	Pleasures and Palaces	Yes	Yes	No	—N/a	Fisher Theatre, Detroit		
1966	Sweet Charity	Yes	Yes	No	—N/a	Palace Theatre, Broadway		
1972	Pippin	Yes	Yes	No	—N/a	Imperial Theatre, Broadway	Also book writer	
1972	Liza	Yes	Yes	No	—N/a	Winter Garden Theatre, Broadway		
1975	Chicago	Yes	Yes	No	—N/a	46th Street Theatre, Broadway	Also book writer	
1978	Dancin'	Yes	Yes	No	—N/a	Ambassador Theatre, Broadway		
1986	Big Deal	Yes	Yes	No	—N/a	Broadway Theatre, Broadway		
1986	Sweet Charity	Yes	Yes	No	—N/a	Minskoff Theatre, Broadway		

== Works ==
=== Film ===
Year	Title	Functioned as				Role	Notes	Ref.
Year	Title	Director	Writer	Choreographer	Actor	Role	Notes	Ref.
1953	The Affairs of Dobie Gillis	No	No	No	Yes	Charlie Trask		
1953	Kiss Me Kate	No	No	No	Yes	Hortensio		
1953	Give a Girl a Break	No	No	No	Yes	Bob Dowdy		
1955	My Sister Eileen	No	No	Yes	Yes	Frank Lippincott		
1957	The Pajama Game	No	No	Yes	No	—N/a		
1958	Damn Yankees	No	No	Yes	Yes	Mambo Dancer	Uncredited	
1969	Sweet Charity	Yes	No	Yes	No	—N/a	Directorial Debut	
1972	Cabaret	Yes	No	Yes	No	—N/a		
1974	The Little Prince	No	No	Yes	Yes	The Snake		
1974	Lenny	Yes	No	No	Yes	The Interviewer		
1977	Thieves	No	No	No	Yes	Mr. Day		
1979	All That Jazz	Yes	Yes	Yes	No	—N/a		
1983	Star 80	Yes	Yes	No	Yes	The Interviewer		

=== Television ===
Year	Title	Functioned as			Role	Notes	Ref.
Year	Title	Director	Choreographer	Actor	Role	Notes	Ref.
1949-50	54th Street Revue	No	No	Yes	Dancer		
1950	The George Burns and Gracie Allen Show	No	No	Yes	Himself	Episode: "Gracie the Artist"	
1951	The Colgate Comedy Hour	No	Yes	No	—N/a	Episodes S1E22 & S1E37	
1959	The Dinah Shore Chevy Show	No	Yes	No	—N/a	Episode S4E1	
1959	Startime	Yes	Yes	No	—N/a	Episode: "The Wonderful World of Entertainment"	
1961	The Seasons of Youth	No	Yes	No	—N/a	Television special	
1970	The Ed Sullivan Show	No	Yes	No	—N/a	Episode S23E19	
1972	Liza with a Z	Yes	No	No	—N/a	Television special	
1982	Pippin: His Life and Times	No	Yes	No	—N/a	Television film	

== Awards, honors, and legacy ==
At the 1973 Academy Awards, Fosse won the Academy Award for Best Director for Cabaret. That same year he won Tony Awards for directing and choreographing Pippin and Primetime Emmy Awards for producing, choreographing and directing Liza Minnelli's television special Liza with a Z. Fosse was the only person to win all three major industry awards in the same year.

Fosse was inducted into the National Museum of Dance in Saratoga Springs, New York, on April 27, 2007. The Los Angeles Dance Awards, founded in 1994, were called the "Fosse Awards", and are now called the American Choreography Awards. The Bob Fosse–Gwen Verdon Fellowship was established by their daughter, Nicole Fosse, in 2003 at the Alvin Ailey American Dance Theater.

Reinking and Verdon kept Fosse's unique choreography alive after his death. Reinking played the role of Roxie Hart in the New York revival of Chicago, which opened in 1996. She choreographed the dances in Fosse style for that revival. In 1999, Verdon served as artistic consultant on a Broadway musical designed to showcase examples of classic Fosse choreography. Called simply Fosse, the three-act musical revue was conceived and choreographed by Chet Walker, directed and co-conceived by Richard Maltby Jr., and co-directed, co-choreographed by co-conceived by Ann Reinking. Verdon and Fosse's daughter, Nicole, received a special thanks credit. The show won a Tony for best musical.

Fosse/Verdon is an eight-part American miniseries starring Sam Rockwell as Fosse and Michelle Williams as Verdon. The series, which tells the story of the couple's troubled personal and professional relationship, is based on the biography Fosse by Sam Wasson. It premiered in eight parts on April 9, 2019, on FX. At the 71st Primetime Emmy Awards, Fosse/Verdon received seventeen nominations, including Outstanding Limited Series and acting nominations for Rockwell, Williams, and Qualley. Williams won the Emmy for Outstanding Actress in a Limited Series.

== See also ==
- List of Tony Award records
