= All That Jazz (film) =

1979 musical film by Bob Fosse

- Theatrical release poster
- Directed by: Bob Fosse
- Written by: Robert Alan Aurthur; Bob Fosse
- Produced by: Robert Alan Aurthur
- Starring: Roy Scheider; Jessica Lange; Ann Reinking; Leland Palmer; Cliff Gorman; Ben Vereen
- Cinematography: Giuseppe Rotunno
- Edited by: Alan Heim
- Music by: Ralph Burns
- Production companies: 20th Century-Fox; Columbia Pictures
- Distributed by: 20th Century-Fox (United States and Canada); Columbia Pictures (International)
- Release date: December 20, 1979
- Running time: 123 minutes
- Country: United States
- Language: English
- Budget: $12 million
- Box office: $37.8 million

All That Jazz is a 1979 American musical drama film directed by Bob Fosse and starring Roy Scheider as an obsessive film and stage director. It is a semi-autobiographical fantasy based on aspects of Fosse's life and career as a dancer, choreographer and filmmaker. It was also the final work of its producer Robert Alan Aurthur, who wrote the screenplay with Fosse and died a year before its release.

The story draws from Fosse's experience editing his 1974 film Lenny while simultaneously staging the Broadway musical Chicago, which he directed, choreographed and co-wrote. Like Fosse, Scheider's character attempts to stage an ambitious Broadway musical while supervising the editing of a film he directed and which, like Lenny, centers on a stand-up comedian. Jessica Lange, Ann Reinking, Leland Palmer, Cliff Gorman and Ben Vereen co-star in supporting roles. The film borrows its title from the song of the same name from Chicago.

All That Jazz was released on December 20, 1979 by 20th Century-Fox in the United States and Canada and by Columbia Pictures in other territories, to commercial and critical success, being praised by critics for its creativity, ambition, choreography, and Scheider's performance, although it was labelled by some as pretentious or "egomaniacal", in particular in regard to its autobiographical nature. It jointly won the Palme d'Or at the 1980 Cannes Film Festival together with Akira Kurosawa's Kagemusha and received a leading nine nominations at the 52nd Academy Awards, including for Best Picture, Best Director, Best Original Screenplay and Best Actor for Scheider, winning four: Best Original Score, Best Art Direction, Best Costume Design, and Best Film Editing. Following its release, Stanley Kubrick called it "[the] best film I think I have ever seen", and in 2001 it was deemed "culturally, historically, or aesthetically significant" by the Library of Congress and selected for preservation in the United States National Film Registry.

== Plot ==
Joe Gideon is a theater director and choreographer attempting to balance staging his latest Broadway musical, NY/LA, while editing a Hollywood film he has directed, The Stand-Up. He is an alcoholic, a driven workaholic who chain-smokes cigarettes, and a womanizer constantly flirting and engaging in sexual encounters with a stream of women. Each morning, he begins his day by playing a tape of Vivaldi while taking doses of Visine, Alka-Seltzer, and Dexedrine, always concluding by looking at himself in the mirror and saying, "It's showtime, folks!" Joe's ex-wife, Audrey Paris, is involved with the production of the show but disapproves of his womanizing ways. Meanwhile, his girlfriend Katie Jagger and daughter Michelle keep him company. In his imagination, he flirts with an angel of death named Angelique in a nightclub setting, discussing his life with her.

As Joe continues to be dissatisfied with his editing job, repeatedly making minor changes to a single monologue, he vents his anger on the dancers and in his choreography. This leads to a highly sexualized number of topless women during a rehearsal, frustrating the show's penny-pinching backers. One of the few moments of joy in his life occurs when Katie and Michelle perform a Fosse-style number for Joe as an homage to the upcoming release of The Stand-Up, moving him to tears. During a table-read of NY/LA, Joe experiences severe chest pains and is admitted to the hospital with severe angina.

Joe brushes off his symptoms, attempting to leave for rehearsal, but he collapses in the doctor's office and is ordered to stay in the hospital for several weeks to rest his heart and recover from exhaustion. NY/LA is postponed, but Gideon continues his antics from the hospital bed, smoking and drinking while hosting endless streams of women in his room. As he does, his condition continues to deteriorate, despite Audrey and Katie remaining by his side for support. A negative review for The Stand-Up, released during Joe's hospitalization, comes in despite the film's financial success, and Gideon has a massive coronary event.

While Joe undergoes coronary artery bypass surgery, the producers of NY/LA realize that the best way to recoup their money and make a profit is to bet on Gideon's death: the insurance proceeds would result in a profit of over half a million dollars. As Gideon goes on life support, he directs extravagant musical dream sequences in his head starring his daughter, wife, and girlfriend, all berating him for his behavior. He realizes he cannot avoid his death and has another heart attack.

As the doctors try to save him, Joe runs away from his hospital bed behind their backs, exploring the basement of the hospital and the autopsy ward before allowing himself to be taken back. He goes through the five stages of grief—anger, denial, bargaining, depression, and acceptance—featured in the stand-up routine he had been editing. As he gets closer to death, his dream sequences become more and more hallucinatory. As the doctors try one more time to save him, Joe imagines a monumental variety show featuring everyone from his past where he takes center stage in an extensive musical number ("Bye Bye Life", a whimsical parody of "Bye Bye Love"). In his dying dream, Joe can thank his family and acquaintances, as he cannot from his hospital bed, and his performance receives a massive standing ovation. Joe finally dreams of himself traveling down a hallway to meet Angelique at the end. His corpse is zipped up in a body bag.

== Cast ==
- Roy Scheider as Joe Gideon
  - Keith Gordon as Young Joe Gideon
- Jessica Lange as Angelique, the Angel of Death
- Ann Reinking as Katie Jagger, Joe's current girlfriend
- Leland Palmer as Audrey Paris, Joe's ex-wife
- Cliff Gorman as Davis Newman, the "Stand-Up"
- Ben Vereen as O'Connor Flood
- Erzsebet Foldi as Michelle Gideon, Joe's daughter
- Michael Tolan as Dr. Ballinger
- Max Wright as Joshua Penn
- William LeMassena as Jonesy Hecht
- Deborah Geffner as Victoria Porter
- Anthony Holland as Paul Dann
- David Margulies as Larry Goldie
- John Lithgow as Lucas Sergeant
- Sandahl Bergman, Eileen Casey, Bruce Davis, Gary Flannery, Jennifer Nairn-Smith, Danny Ruvolo, Leland Schwantes, John Sowinski, Candace Tovar, and Rima Vetter as Principal Dancers
- P. J. Mann as Fan Dancer / Menage Partner #2
- Robert Levine as Dr. Hyman
- Robert Hitt as Ted Christopher
- Phil Friedman as Murray Nathan, the stage manager
- Susan Brooks as Stacy (as Sue Paul)
- Alan Heim as Eddie
- Chris Chase as Leslie Perry, film critic
- Jules Fisher as Himself
- Ben Masters as Dr. Garry
- Joanna Merlin as Nurse Pierce
- C. C. H. Pounder as Nurse Blake
- Tito Goya as Attendant
- Tiger Haynes as Porter
- Vicki Frederick as Menage Partner #1
- Frankie Man as Comic
- Wallace Shawn as Assistant Insurance man
- Eugene Troobnick as Insurance Doctor
- I.M. Hobson, Mary McCarty, Theresa Merritt, Sammy Smith, and Steve Elmore as Cast of NY / LA
- Terry Alexander as Hospital Orderly (uncredited)
- Michael Hinton as Band Drummer (uncredited)

== Music ==
=== Soundtrack ===
- "On Broadway" – George Benson
- "Perfect Day" – Harry Nilsson
- "There's No Business Like Show Business" – Ethel Merman
- "Concerto alla rustica (Vivaldi Concerto in G)" – Antonio Vivaldi. This theme recurs throughout the film during Joe's morning regimens.
- "South Mt. Sinai Parade" – Ralph Burns

=== Numbers ===
- "Take Off with Us" – Paul
- "Take Off with Us (Airotica)" – Sandahl Bergman and Dancers
- "Everything Old Is New Again" – danced by Michelle and Kate (to recording of Peter Allen)
- "Hospital Hop" – Paul
- "After You've Gone" – Audrey with Kate and Michelle (Leland Palmer, Ann Reinking and Erzsébet Földi)
- "There'll Be Some Changes Made" – Kate with Audrey and Michelle
- "Who's Sorry Now?" – Female Ensemble with Kate, Audrey and Michelle
- "Some of These Days" – Michelle with Kate and Audrey
- "Bye Bye Life" (from the Everly Brothers' "Bye Bye Love") – O'Connor and Joe with Ensemble

=== Charts ===
Chart performance for All That Jazz
Chart (1980)	Peak position
Australian Albums (Kent Music Report)	64
Canada Top Albums/CDs (RPM)	26
Swedish Albums (Sverigetopplistan)	25
US Billboard 200	36

== Production ==
While trying to edit Lenny and choreograph Chicago in 1974, Fosse suffered a massive heart attack and underwent open heart surgery. After recovering, Fosse became interested in the subject of life and death and hospital behavior. Alongside his friend Robert Alan Aurthur, they set out to make a film adaption of Ending by Hilma Wolitzer which had similar themes of death and marital problems. However, after completing the screenplay, Fosse decided against making it a film as he found the material too depressing and felt he wasn't strong enough to stick with it for over a year. Still wanting to stick with the subject matter of death and wanting to use what he felt were his best tools of song and dance, he instead decided to make a film based on his own experiences with making Lenny and Chicago. The story's structure closely mirrors Fosse's own health issues at the time and is often compared to Federico Fellini's 8½, another thinly veiled autobiographical film with fantastical elements.

The part of Audrey Paris—Joe's ex-wife and continuing muse, played by Leland Palmer—closely reflects that of Fosse's wife, the dancer and actress Gwen Verdon, who continued to work with him on projects including Chicago and All That Jazz itself.

Gideon's rough handling of chorus girl Victoria Porter closely resembles Bob Fosse's own treatment of Jennifer Nairn-Smith during rehearsals for Pippin. Nairn-Smith herself appears in the film as Jennifer, one of the NY/LA dancers.

Ann Reinking auditioned for and received the role of Katie Jagger, a role loosely based on herself.

Cliff Gorman was cast in the titular role of The Stand-Up—the film-within-a-film version of Lenny—after having played the role of Lenny Bruce in the original theatrical production of the show (for which he won a Tony Award), but was passed over for Fosse's film version of the production in favor of Dustin Hoffman.

The part of Joe Gideon was offered to Paul Newman, who turned it down as he didn't feel the character was redeemable and also didn't take Fosse into consideration. Newman would later call it a "dumb mistake".

With increasing production costs and a loss of enthusiasm for the film, Columbia brought in Fox to finance completion, and the latter studio acquired domestic distribution rights in return.

== Critical reception ==
On the review aggregator website Rotten Tomatoes, 88% of 48 critics' reviews are positive, with an average rating of 8.1/10. The website's consensus reads: "Director Bob Fosse and star Roy Scheider are at the top of their games in this dazzling, self-aware stage drama about a death-obsessed director-choreographer." Metacritic, which uses a weighted average, assigned the film a score of 72 out of 100, based on 13 critics, indicating "generally favorable" reviews.

In his review in The New York Times, Vincent Canby called the film "an uproarious display of brilliance, nerve, dance, maudlin confessions, inside jokes and, especially, ego" and "an essentially funny movie that seeks to operate on too many levels at the same time... some of it makes you wince, but a lot of it is great fun... A key to the success of the production is the performance of Roy Scheider as Joe Gideon... With an actor of less weight and intensity, All That Jazz might have evaporated as we watched it. Mr. Scheider's is a presence to reckon with."

Variety described it as "a self-important, egomaniacal, wonderfully choreographed, often compelling film" and added, "Roy Scheider gives a superb performance as Gideon, creating a character filled with nervous energy... The film's major flaw lies in its lack of real explanation of what, beyond ego, really motivates [him]."

Gene Siskel praised the film on Sneak Previews, finding it fresh and entertaining describing it as "an obituary of a creative man who's afraid his work just might be trivial." His colleague Roger Ebert gave the film a mixed review, praising Fosse's choreography though criticizing the story, finding it discombobulated and self-indulgent. He also found it inferior to 8½, stating, "I think it's kind of ironic Bob Fosse makes a film about his own life and it turns out to be Fellini's life." In 2003, Ebert said he had changed his opinion, and praised the film stating that he was "wrong" about it at the time and felt it was unfair of him to compare it to Fellini.

Stanley Kauffmann of The New Republic wrote 'Except for one brief flashback, it's a latter-day self destructive agon in which the protagonist is beginning a complex Broadway show,'.

TV Guide said, "The dancing is frenzied, the dialogue piercing, the photography superb, and the acting first-rate, with non-showman Scheider an illustrious example of casting against type . . . All That Jazz is great-looking but not easy to watch. Fosse's indulgent vision at times approaches sour self-loathing."

Leonard Maltin gave the film two-and-a-half stars (out of four) in his 2009 movie guide; he said that the film was "self-indulgent and largely negative," and that "great show biz moments and wonderful dancing are eventually buried in pretensions"; he also called the ending "an interminable finale which leaves a bad taste for the whole film."

Time Out London states, "As translated onto screen, [Fosse's] story is wretched: the jokes are relentlessly crass and objectionable; the song 'n' dance routines have been created in the cutting-room and have lost any sense of fun; Fellini-esque moments add little but pretension; and scenes of a real open-heart operation, alternating with footage of a symbolic Angel of Death in veil and white gloves, fail even in terms of the surreal."

Upon release in 1979, director Stanley Kubrick, who is mentioned in the movie, reportedly called it "[the] best film I think I have ever seen". In 2001, All That Jazz was deemed "culturally, historically, or aesthetically significant" by the Library of Congress and selected for preservation in the National Film Registry. It was also preserved by the Academy Film Archive in the same year. In 2006, the film was ranked #14 by the American Film Institute on its list of the Greatest Movie Musicals.

The film would be the last musical nominated for the Academy Award for Best Picture until Disney's Beauty and the Beast was nominated in 1992, and was the last live-action musical to compete in the category until Baz Luhrmann's Moulin Rouge! was nominated in 2002.

== Accolades ==
Year	Award	Category	Nominee(s)	Result
1979	Academy Awards	Best Picture	Robert Alan Aurthur	Nominated
1979	Academy Awards	Best Director	Bob Fosse	Nominated
1979	Academy Awards	Best Actor	Roy Scheider	Nominated
1979	Academy Awards	Best Screenplay – Written Directly for the Screen	Robert Alan Aurthur and Bob Fosse	Nominated
1979	Academy Awards	Best Art Direction	Art Direction: Philip Rosenberg and Tony Walton; Set Decoration: Edward Stewart and Gary Brink	Won
1979	Academy Awards	Best Cinematography	Giuseppe Rotunno	Nominated
1979	Academy Awards	Best Costume Design	Albert Wolsky	Won
1979	Academy Awards	Best Film Editing	Alan Heim	Won
1979	Academy Awards	Best Original Song Score and Its Adaptation or Adaptation Score	Ralph Burns	Won
1979	American Cinema Editors Awards	Best Edited Feature Film	Alan Heim	Won
1979	Bodil Awards	Best Non-European Film	Bob Fosse	Won
1980	British Academy Film Awards	Best Actor in a Leading Role	Roy Scheider	Nominated
1980	British Academy Film Awards	Best Cinematography	Giuseppe Rotunno	Won
1980	British Academy Film Awards	Best Costume Design	Albert Wolsky	Nominated
1980	British Academy Film Awards	Best Editing	Alan Heim	Won
1980	British Academy Film Awards	Best Production Design	Philip Rosenberg	Nominated
1980	British Academy Film Awards	Best Sound	Maurice Schell, Dick Vorisek, and Christopher Newman	Nominated
1980	Cannes Film Festival	Palme d'Or	Bob Fosse	Won
1980	Golden Globe Awards	Best Actor in a Motion Picture – Musical or Comedy	Roy Scheider	Nominated
1979	Japan Academy Prize	Outstanding Foreign Language Film	Bob Fosse	Nominated
1979	National Society of Film Critics Awards	Best Actor	Roy Scheider	5th Place
1980	New York Film Critics Circle Awards	Best Director	Bob Fosse	3rd Place

=== Honors ===
- In 2001, it was listed as one of the films under the National Film Preservation Board
- AFI's Greatest Movie Musicals — #14
- AFI's 100 Years... 100 Movie Quotes
  - "It's showtime!" (nominated)
- In 2012, the Motion Picture Editors Guild listed the film as the fourth best edited film of all time based on a survey of its membership.
- In 2025, IndieWire named All That Jazz as the greatest film of the 1970s.

== Home media ==
VHS 1988 1991 1995 The DVD issued in 2003 features scene-specific commentary by Roy Scheider and interviews with Scheider and Fosse. 20th Century Fox Home Entertainment released a "Special Music Edition" DVD in 2007, with an audio commentary by the film's Oscar-winning editor, Alan Heim. Blu-ray and DVD editions were released in August 2014 with all the old special features, as well as new supplements through The Criterion Collection brand.

== Legacy ==
The final dance sequence of All That Jazz is depicted in FX's Fosse/Verdon starring Sam Rockwell as Bob Fosse. The series' executive producer and Broadway star Lin-Manuel Miranda played the dual role of Joe Gideon/Roy Scheider. The "Get Happy" dream sequence musical number in the season 7 House episode "Bombshells" was also inspired by this dance sequence.

The film is referenced in the Better Call Saul first-season episode, "Mijo". During the episode, there is a montage, set to the same Vivaldi concerto as used in the movie, depicting the daily routine of protagonist Jimmy McGill, which includes looking at himself in the mirror and saying "It's showtime, folks!", mirroring the words and gesture part of All That Jazz protagonist Joe Gideon's own routine; McGill acknowledges that the words are "from a movie" when a bystander sees him do the routine.

Season 3 Episode 5 of GLOW, "Freaky Tuesday", opens with the same Vivaldi concerto music while the character Tammé is shown struggling, with the help of pills and wine and hot showers, to wake up every morning and tamp down her back pain while continuing to perform as a wrestler each night.

Season 3 Episode 10 of Get a Life, "Zoo Animals on Wheels", features a rehearsal montage set to "On Broadway". During this sequence, Chris Peterson (Chris Elliott) mimics Joe Gideon's cigarette smoking and use of Visine before saying, "It's showtime, folks!" to himself in his dressing room mirror. Elliott would again reference the film in the finale of the Adult Swim series Eagleheart, which concludes with a recreation of the "Bye Bye Life" sequence, with his character Chris Monsanto as Joe Gideon.

The David Fincher–directed music video for Paula Abdul's song "Cold Hearted" is inspired by the "Take Off With Us" dance sequence in All That Jazz.

The 2006 film Marie Antoinette written and directed by Sofia Coppola reuses the Vivaldi concerto in a montage depicting the daily routine of Marie's life with her husband.
