= Ann Reinking =

American actress, dancer, and choreographer (1949–2020)

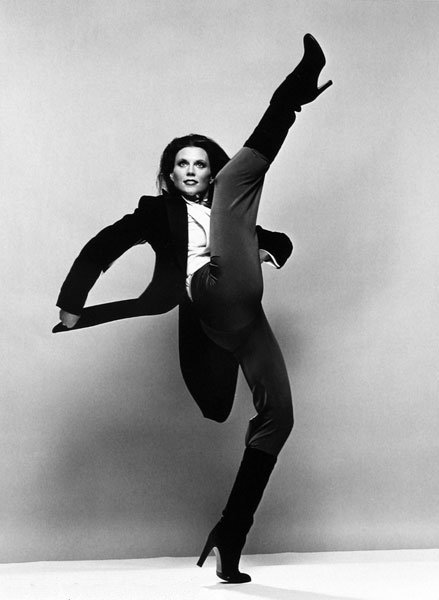
- Reinking photographed by Jack Mitchell in 1981
- Born: November 10, 1949; Seattle, Washington, U.S.
- Died: December 12, 2020 (aged 71); Seattle, Washington, U.S.
- Resting place: Paradise Memorial Gardens
- Occupations: Actress; singer; dancer; choreographer
- Years active: 1962–2017
- Spouses: Larry Small (m. 1970, divorced) Herbert Allen Jr. (m. 1982; div. 1989) James Stuart (m. 1989; div. 1991) Peter Talbert (m. 1994)
- Partner: Bob Fosse (1972–1978)
- Children: 1

Ann Reinking (November 10, 1949 – December 12, 2020) was an American dancer, actress, choreographer, and singer. As a star of Broadway musicals, her credits include Over Here! (1974), Goodtime Charley (1975), Chicago (1977), Dancin' (1978), and Sweet Charity (1986). On screen, her films include All That Jazz (1979), Annie (1982), and Micki & Maude (1984).

Reinking won the Tony Award for Best Choreography for her work in the 1996 revival of Chicago, which she choreographed while reprising the role of Roxie Hart. For the 2000 West End production of Fosse, she won the Olivier Award for Best Theatre Choreographer.

== Early life ==
Ann Reinking was born on November 10, 1949, in Seattle, the daughter of Frances (née Harrison), a homemaker, and Walter Floyd Reinking, a hydraulic engineer. She grew up in Bellevue. As a child, Reinking began ballet lessons, studying with former Ballets Russes dancers Marian and Illaria Ladre in Seattle.

Reinking made her professional performing debut at the age of 12 in a production of Giselle with The Royal Ballet in the United Kingdom. While attending middle school and high school, she studied at the San Francisco Ballet during the summers as a part of a scholarship. After graduating from Bellevue High School, she took summer classes offered by the Joffrey Ballet at Pacific Lutheran University in Tacoma, Washington.

== Career ==
Reinking moved to New York City at age 18, and danced as a member of the corps de ballet at the Radio City Music Hall, performed in the ensemble of the second national tour of Fiddler on the Roof, and at the age of 19 made her Broadway debut in the musical Cabaret. She was a chorus dancer in Coco (1969), Wild and Wonderful (1971), and Pippin (1972). During Pippin, she came to the attention of the show's director and choreographer Bob Fosse. Reinking became Fosse's protégée and romantic partner, even as Fosse was still legally married to (though separated from) Gwen Verdon at the time.

In 1974, Reinking came to critical notice in the role of Maggie in Over Here!, winning a Theatre World Award. She starred as Joan of Arc in Goodtime Charley in 1975, receiving Tony Award and Drama Desk nominations for Best Actress in a Musical. In 1976, she replaced Donna McKechnie as Cassie in A Chorus Line; in 1977, she replaced Verdon in the starring role of Roxie Hart in Chicago, a show directed and choreographed by Fosse. In 1978, she appeared in Fosse's revue Dancin', and received another Tony nomination. In that year, Reinking and Fosse ended their romance and separated when Fosse began dating Julie Hagerty. However, they continued to have a professional, creative collaboration. Fosse's influence on Reinking's work as a choreographer could be seen in her retention of his "dark, jazzlike, fluid body movements." In 1979, Reinking appeared in Fosse's semi-autobiographical film All That Jazz as Katie Jagger, a role loosely based on her own life and relationship with Fosse. Reinking appeared in two more feature films, as Grace Farrell in Annie (1982) and as Micki Salinger in Micki & Maude (1984). In a 2019 mini-series aired on FX, Fosse/Verdon, Margaret Qualley portrayed Reinking and her relationship with Fosse.

In March 1985, Reinking appeared at the 57th Academy Awards to give a mostly lip-synced vocal performance accompanied by a dance routine of the Academy Award-nominated Phil Collins single "Against All Odds (Take a Look at Me Now)". The routine was poorly received by critics from the Los Angeles Times and People, as well as by Collins himself in a Rolling Stone interview. In 1986, she returned to Broadway, replacing Debbie Allen in a successful revival of Fosse's production of Sweet Charity. In 1991, she appeared in her first theater production following the birth of her son, the Broadway National Tour of Bye Bye Birdie, costarring Tommy Tune. Also in 1991, she founded the Broadway Theatre Project, a Florida training program connecting students with seasoned theater professionals including Gwen Verdon, Julie Andrews, Gregory Hines, Ben Vereen, Jeff Goldblum, Terrence Mann, James Naughton, Patrick Wilson and Desmond Richardson. In 1992, she contributed choreography to Tommy Tune Tonite!, a three-man revue featuring Tune. In 1994, In 1995, she choreographed the ABC television movie version of Bye Bye Birdie.

Reinking had retired from performing by this time. In 1996, she was asked to create the choreography "in the style of Bob Fosse" for an all-star four-night-only concert staging of Chicago for City Center's annual Encores! Concert Series. When the producers could not obtain a suitable actress for the role of Roxie Hart, Reinking agreed to reprise the role after almost 20 years. This concert staging of Chicago was a hit, and a few months later the production (in its concert staging presentation) was produced on Broadway, with the Encores! cast: Reinking, Bebe Neuwirth, Joel Grey, James Naughton, and Marcia Lewis. In November 2016, the revival celebrated its 20th year, and as of March 2020, when theaters temporarily closed due to the COVID-19 pandemic, it was the longest-running American musical on Broadway. The revival of Chicago won numerous Tony Awards, and Reinking won the Tony Award for Best Choreography. She recreated her choreography for the 1997 London transfer of Chicago, which starred Ute Lemper and Ruthie Henshall.

In 1998, she co-created, co-directed and co-choreographed the revue Fosse, receiving a Tony Award co-nomination for Best Direction of a Musical. For her work on the West End production of Fosse, Reinking (along with the late Bob Fosse himself) won the 2001 Olivier Award for Best Theatre Choreographer.

In 2001, she received an honorary doctorate from Florida State University for her contribution to the arts. Reinking served as a judge of annual New York City public school dance competitions for inner-city youth, and appeared in Mad Hot Ballroom, the 2005 documentary film about the competition. In 2011, Reinking collaborated with composer Bruce Wolosoff and Thodos Dance Chicago to create the ballet The Devil in the White City, based on the novel of the same name by Erik Larsen; the Chicago Sun-Times named it "Best Dance of 2011." Reinking again collaborated with Wolosoff in 2013 to create A Light in the Dark, a ballet inspired by the lives of Helen Keller and Ann Sullivan, which was nominated for a Chicago/Midwest Emmy Award in Outstanding Achievement for Arts/Entertainment Programming. In 2012, she contributed choreography for the Broadway production of An Evening with Patti LuPone and Mandy Patinkin. She served as a member of the advising committee for the American Theatre Wing.

== Personal life ==
Reinking married four times. She was first married on March 19, 1972, to Broadway actor Larry Small, whom she divorced the same year. Reinking was married to investment banker Herbert Allen Jr. from 1982 to 1989. In 1989, she married businessman James Stuart, with whom she had a son, Christopher, before their divorce in 1991. Reinking married sportswriter Peter Talbert in 1994.

Reinking retired in 2017 and lived in Paradise Valley, Arizona.

Reinking's son has Marfan syndrome, and Reinking worked with the Marfan Foundation, which is dedicated to raising awareness of the disease. She produced the 2009 documentary In My Hands: A Story of Marfan Syndrome.

== Death ==
Reinking died in her sleep at a hotel in Seattle, Washington, on December 12, 2020, at the age of 71, while on a visit to her family in the area. She is interred at the Paradise Memorial Gardens in Scottsdale, Arizona.

Upon her death, the lobby of the Ambassador Theatre, home of the current revival of Chicago, installed an "In Memoriam" poster of her in costume as Roxie Hart from the 1996 opening cast.

Following her death, students of Reinking's Broadway Theatre Project produced a documentary in her honor called The Joy is in the Work.

== Credits ==
Filmography
| Year | Title | Role | Notes | Ref. |
|---|---|---|---|---|
| 1976 | Ellery Queen | Lorelie Farnsworth | Episode: "The Adventure of the Eccentric Engineer" | |
| 1977 | The Andros Targets | Laura Harper | Episode: "The Surrender" | |
| 1978 | Movie Movie | Troubles Moran | | |
| 1979 | All That Jazz | Kate Jagger | | |
| 1982 | Annie | Grace Farrell | | |
| 1984 | Micki & Maude | Micki Salinger | | |
| 1987 | The Cosby Show | Jill Kelly | Episode: "Bald and Beautiful" | |

Broadway Theater
| Year | Title | Role | Notes | Ref. |
|---|---|---|---|---|
| 1969 | Cabaret | Ensemble | | |
| 1969 | Coco | Ensemble | | |
| 1971 | Wild and Wonderful | Ensemble | | |
| 1972 | Pippin | Ensemble, Catherine understudy | | |
| 1974 | Over Here! | Maggie | | |
| 1975 | Goodtime Charley | Joan of Arc | | |
| 1976 | A Chorus Line | Cassie Ferguson (replacement) | | |
| 1977 | Chicago | Roxie Hart (replacement) | | |
| 1978 | Dancin' | Ensemble | | |
| 1986 | Sweet Charity | Charity Hope Valentine (replacement) | | |
| 1992 | Tommy Tune Tonite! | | "Choreographic contributions by Ann Reinking" | |
| 1996 | Chicago | Roxie Hart | "Choreographed in the style of Bob Fosse by Ann Reinking" | |
| 2001 | Fosse | Ensemble (replacement) | "Conceived, co-directed and co-choreographed by Ann Reinking" | |
| 2003 | The Look of Love | | "Conceived and co-choreographed by Ann Reinking" | |
| 2011 | An Evening with Patti LuPone and Mandy Patinkin | | "Choreographed by Ann Reinking" | |

Other Theater
| Year | Title | Role | Notes | Ref. |
|---|---|---|---|---|
| 1965 | Bye Bye Birdie | Ensemble | Seattle Opera House | |
| 1968 | Fiddler on the Roof | Ensemble | Broadway National Tour | |
| 1975 | Girl Crazy | Molly Gray | The Muny | |
| 1976 | A Chorus Line | Cassie Ferguson | Broadway National Tour | |
| 1982 | The Unsinkable Molly Brown | Molly Brown | The Muny | |
| 1988 | Pal Joey | Melba Snyder | Goodman Theatre | |
| 1991 | Bye Bye Birdie | Rose Alvarez | Broadway National Tour; also choreographer | |
| 1996 | Applause | | Broadway National Tour; "Choreographed by Ann Reinking" | |
| 1999 | Chicago | Roxie Hart (replacement) | Broadway National Tour; "Choreographed in the style of Bob Fosse by Ann Reinking" | |
| 1999 | Fosse | | Broadway National Tour; "Conceived, co-directed and co-choreographed by Ann Reinking" | |
| 2001 | The Visit | | Goodman Theatre; "Choreographed by Ann Reinking" | |
| 2003 | No Strings | | New York City Center; "Choreographed by Ann Reinking" | |
| 2004 | Here Lies Jenny | | Zipper Theatre; "Choreographed by Ann Reinking" | |
| 2008 | The Visit | | Signature Theatre; "Choreography by Ann Reinking" | |
| 2008 | Chicago | | Broadway National Tour; "Choreographed in the style of Bob Fosse by Ann Reinking" | |
| 2013 | Chicago | | Broadway National Tour; "Choreographed in the style of Bob Fosse by Ann Reinking" | |
| 2018 | Chicago | | Théâtre Mogador; "Choreographed in the style of Bob Fosse by Ann Reinking" | |

== Awards ==
List of awards and nominations
| Year | Award | Category | Result | Title | Ref. |
|---|---|---|---|---|---|
| 1974 | Theatre World Award | Theatre World Award | Won | Over Here! | |
| 1974 | Clarence Derwent Award | Most Promising Female Performer | Won | Over Here! | |
| 1974 | Outer Critics Circle Award | Outstanding Actress in a Musical | Won | Over Here! | |
| 1975 | Tony Award | Best Actress in a Musical | Nominated | Goodtime Charley | |
| 1975 | Drama Desk Award | Outstanding Actress in a Musical | Nominated | Goodtime Charley | |
| 1978 | Tony Award | Best Featured Actress in a Musical | Nominated | Dancin' | |
| 1997 | Tony Award | Best Choreography | Won | Chicago | |
| 1997 | Outer Critics Circle Award | Outstanding Choreography | Won | Chicago | |
| 1997 | Drama Desk Award | Outstanding Choreography | Won | Chicago | |
| 1997 | Astaire Award | Best Female Dancer | Won | Chicago | |
| 1997 | Astaire Award | Best Choreographer | Won | Chicago | |
| 1998 | Laurence Olivier Award | Best Choreography | Nominated | Chicago | |
| 1999 | Tony Award | Best Director | Nominated | Fosse | |
| 1999 | Outer Critics Circle Award | Outstanding Choreography | Nominated | Fosse | |
| 1999 | Outer Critics Circle Award | Outstanding Director of a Musical | Nominated | Fosse | |
| 1999 | Drama Desk Award | Outstanding Director of a Musical | Nominated | Fosse | |
| 2001 | Laurence Olivier Award | Best Choreography | Won | Fosse | |
| 2001 | Helpmann Award | Best Choreography | Won | Chicago | |
