= Enfin Réunis =

Compilation album by Les Cowboys Fringants
- Released: 2001
- Recorded: studio Economik
- Genre: Alternative rock(néo-trad)
- Label: La Tribu
- Producer: Les Cowboys Fringants

Les Cowboys Fringants chronology
| Motel Capri (2000) | Enfin Réunis (2001) | Break syndical (2002) |

Enfin Réunis (Finally Reunited) is the name of the fifth album by Québécois néo-trad band Les Cowboys Fringants. It's a double album (2 CD). This album is actually the first two albums by Les Cowboys Fringants 12 grandes chansons and Sur mon canapé. It was created due to high demand as the two first albums were desirable object to hard core fans[...]despite the musical errors, simple songs, and the "cheapo" side of recordings.

The CD cover show pictures of both albums with their respective title with the note: Enfin Reunis les deux premiers disques broche a foin - finally united the sloppy first two albums The first album 12 grandes chansons picture looks like a bad black and white photocopy and has the format of a cassette tape, since it was originally released on tape cassette only. We decided to record a tape so our friends would have a souvenir.

The inside booklet goes on for 13 pages on the history of the band and the two albums. Interesting note the recording of the first album was done for about $800. A quote from Karl Tremblay stating: In those days it didn't take long to create a song. We did not bother too much, even if it did not rime we didn't care. On Sur mon canapé J-F Pauzé states We did not practice the songs enough before getting in the studio. It gave a special album with numerous errors and a "botched" aspect. The songs were good but it sounded sloppy'.

== Track listing ==
=== 12 grandes chansons ===
1. Les routes du bonheur - 3:36
2. Awikatchikaën - 2:50
3. Evangéline - 3:40
4. Cass de pouelle - 3:20
5. L'agacepésie - 3:16
6. Dieudonné Rastapopoulos - 3:52
7. Platsburg - 3:39
8. Willie Jos Hachey - 2:34
9. Gaétane - 4:38
10. Repentigny-by-the-sea - 2:39
11. Le hurlot - 3:21
12. Impala blues - 4:46

=== Sur mon canapé ===
1. Marcel Galarneau (Tremblay, Pauzé) - 2:43
2. Le plombier (Pauzé, Tremblay, Lebeau) - 3:06
3. Spécial #6 (Tremblay, Pauzé) - 3:51
4. Maurice au bistro (Pauzé, Lépine) - 3:48
5. Goldie (Lebeau) - 3:30
6. Denise Martinez (Pauzé, Lebeau) - 3:07
7. Mon pays (reel des Aristocrates) (Pauzé, Lépine) - 4:49
8. Le quai de Berthier (Lebeau, Pauzé, Tremblay) - 4:57
9. Grosse femme (Pauzé, Caza) - 3:15
10. La gosse à Comeau (Pauzé) - 5:19
11. La culbute (Pauzé, Lebeau) - 2:39
12. Banlieue (Pauzé) - 4:42

== Band members ==
- Karl Tremblay - Lead vocals, wrong notes, and animal noises
- J-F Pauzé - guitars, vocals
- Marie-Annick Lépine - Violin, Accordion, Mandolin, vocals
- Jérome Dupras - bass, vocals
- Dominique Lebeau - drums, "Blue thing", and dance

== Additional credits ==
=== Enfin Réunis ===
- Sing, played, more or less arranged, produced by Les Cowboys Fringants
- Official "Guest Star": Vincent Caza (acoustic guitar on "Grosse Femme")
- Les productions Louboy International
- Distribution Exclusive: DEP

=== 12 grandes chansons ===
- Sound and mixing: Marc-André Lepage (studio Economik), July 1997
- Album cover infographics: Alex Bex for Démodisk
- Lyrics: Karl Tremblay and J-F Pauzé
- Music: J-F Pauzé

=== Sur mon canapé ===
- Sound and mixing: Dominic Despins (studio Economik), November 1998
- Photos: J-F Pauzé and Jessica Violette
- Infographics: Bob Fish
