= En concert au Zénith de Paris =

Live album by Les Cowboys Fringants
- Released: 2010
- Genre: Alternative rock (néo-trad)
- Length: 58:17
- Label: La Tribu
- Producer: La Compagnie Larivée-Cabot-Champagne for Les Disque De La Tribu

Les Cowboys Fringants chronology
| Sur un air de déjà vu (2008) | En concert au Zénith de Paris (2010) | Que du vent (2011) |

En concert au Zénith de Paris is a live album recorded in Paris, France, which was released in 2010 by the Québécois néo-trad band Les Cowboys Fringants. This album mainly features songs from their 2008 studio album L'expédition. The group wanted their fans to have access to other songs recorded on the night they made the live album, so each week since the release of the album, a bonus song was released on their official website.

== Track listing ==
1. "Droit devant" – 4:46
2. "La reine" – 3:15
3. "La manifestation" – 3:23
4. "Entre deux taxis" – 3:28
5. "Histoire de pêche" – 3:52
6. "La Catherine" – 3:32
7. "Monsieur" – 3:59
8. "La tête haute" – 4:43
9. "Une autre journée qui se lève" – 5:16
10. "8 secondes" – 5:26
11. "Plus rien" – 7:01
12. "Tant qu'on aura de l'amour" – 3:32
13. "Les étoiles filantes" – 6:04

== Charts ==
Chart performance for En concert au Zénith de Paris
| Chart (2010) | Peak position |
|---|---|
| French Albums (SNEP) | 66 |
