= 46th Félix Awards =

2024 Canadian music award ceremony

- Date: November 3, 2024
- Hosted by: Pierre-Yves Roy-Desmarais

Television/radio coverage
- Network: SRC

The 46th Félix Awards were held on November 3, 2024, to honour achievements in Quebec music. The ceremony was hosted by comedian Pierre-Yves Roy-Desmarais.

The advance gala, presenting the awards in lower-profile and industry categories, was held on October 30.

== Nominees and winners ==
| Male Artist of the Year | Female Artist of the Year |
|---|---|
| Daniel Bélanger; Ludovick Bourgeois; FouKi; Bruno Pelletier; Souldia | Alexandra Stréliski; Isabelle Boulay; Roxane Bruneau; Sara Dufour; Ingrid St-Pierre |
| Group of the Year | Revelation of the Year |
| Les Cowboys Fringants; 2Frères; Bleu Jeans Bleu; Salebarbes; Les Trois Accords | Barnev; Émile Bourgault; Sophie Grenier; Rau Ze; Arielle Soucy |
| Song of the Year | Songwriter of the Year |
| Les Cowboys Fringants, "La Fin du show"; Roxane Bruneau, "J'te retiens pas"; Charlotte Cardin, "Confetti"; comment debord, "Blood Pareil"; Andréanne A. Malette, "Le Reste du temps"; Ariane Moffatt, "Nuit magique"; Rau Ze, "L'Habitude"; Salebarbes, "Tite Gomme"; Aliocha Schneider, "Ensemble"; Les Trois Accords, "Vol à l'étalage" | Les Cowboys Fringants, Pub Royal; Karkwa, Dans la seconde; Alexandre Poulin, La somme des êtres aimés; Aliocha Schneider, Aliocha Schneider; Souldia, Non conventionnel |
| Indigenous Artist of the Year | Adult Contemporary Album of the Year |
| Elisapie; Jeremy Dutcher; Natasha Kanapé; Soleil Launière; Florent Vollant | Beyries, Du feu dans les lilas; Viviane Audet, Les nuits avancent comme des camions blindés sur les filles; Ian Kelly, Les nuages; Andréanne A. Malette, Les jardins dérangés; Marilou, Traits d'union |
| Alternative Album of the Year | Anglophone Album of the Year |
| Les Cowboys Fringants, Pub Royal; Bibi Club, Feu de garde; Laurence-Anne, Oniromancie; P'tit Belliveau, P'tit Belliveau; VioleTT PI, Baloney suicide | Charlotte Cardin, 99 Nights; Bobby Bazini, Pearl; Half Moon Run, Salt; Shaina Hayes, Kindergarten Heart; Elliot Maginot, I Need to Stay Here |
| Bestselling Album of the Year | Bilingual or Other Language Album of the Year |
| Alexandra Stréliski, Néo-romance; 2Frères, 2Frères à l'Anglicane; Daniel Bélanger, Mercure en mai; Roxane Bruneau, Submergé; Les Cowboys Fringants, Pub Royal; Sara Dufour, On va-tu prendre une marche?; Lost, Héritage; Salebarbes, À boire deboutte; Nathalie Simard, Mon Noël; Souldia, Non conventionnel | Jeremy Dutcher, Motewolonuwok; Myriam Gendron, Mayday; Moonshine, Noir Fever présente Moonshine & la Fédération Internationale du bruit; Or Bleu, Beaucoup; TEKE::TEKE, Hagata |
| Classical Album of the Year | Country Album of the Year |
| Angèle Dubeau, Signature : Philip Glass; Buzz Cuivres, Héritage; Mathieu Gaudet, Schubert : Architect — Intégrale des sonates et œuvres majeures pour piano, volume 8; Charles Richard-Hamelin, Les Violons du Roy and Jonathan Cohen, Mozart : piano concertos Nos. 20 & 23; Montreal Symphony Orchestra, Strauss : Ein Heldenleben / Mahler : Rückert-Lieder | Salebarbes, À boire deboutte; Alex Burger, Ça s’invente pas; Grande Ourse, Grande ourse; Hauterive, Hauterive; Léa Jarry, Comme avant |
| Critic's Choice Album of the Year | Electronic Album of the Year |
| Les Cowboys Fringants, Pub Royal; Bibi Club, Feu de garde; comment debord, Monde autour; Karkwa, Dans la seconde; Population II, Électrons libres du Québec; Arielle Soucy, Il n’y a rien que je ne suis pas | CRi, Miracles; Leeman, Healing; Peter Peter, Éther; Super Plage, Magie à minuit; Totalement Sublime, Albédo / Parhélie |
| Folk Album of the Year | Indigenous Language Album of the Year |
| Sara Dufour, On va-tu prendre une marche?; Émile Bilodeau, Au bar des espoirs; Kaïn, El grande torpedo; Alexandre Poulin, La somme des êtres aimés; Arielle Soucy, Il n’y a rien que je ne suis pas | Florent Vollant, Tshitatau; Juurini, Aqqutinni; Soleil Launière, Taueu; Various Artists, Weckatc Nikamowin |
| Instrumental Album of the Year | Interpretive Album of the Year |
| Flore Laurentienne, 8 Tableaux Gagnant; Grégory Charles, Piano renaissance — Appassionato; Mélissa Fortin, Prismacolore; Sef Lemelin, Contemplation; Simon Leoza, Acte III | Elisapie, Inuktitut; 2Frères, 2Frères à l’Anglicane; Ariane Roy, Thierry Larose and Lou-Adriane Cassidy, Le Roy, La Rose et Le Lou[p]; Michel Rivard, Le tour du bloc – l’album du spectacle; Nathalie Simard, Mon Noël |
| Jazz Album of the Year | Rap Album of the Year |
| Dominique Fils-Aimé, Our Roots Run Deep; Philippe Côté and François Bourassa, Confluence; Carl Mayotte, Carnaval; Jacques Kuba Séguin, Parfum No. 2 (avec l’Orchestre National de Jazz de Montréal); Marianne Trudel, Time Poem : La joie de l’éphémère | Souldia, Non conventionnel; Alaclair Ensemble, Lait paternel; FouKi, Rap club; Fredz, Demain il fera beau; Lost, Héritage |
| R&B/Soul Album of the Year | Pop Album of the Year |
| Rau Ze, Virer nos vies; Barnev, Qui je suis; David Campana, Anyways, c’est pas de la pop; Dee Joyce, Un grand A; Jules, Pour tout vous dire | Roxane Bruneau, Submergé; Evelyne Brochu, Le Danger; comment debord, Monde autour; Aliocha Schneider, Aliocha Schneider; Valence, La nuit s'achève |
| Rock Album of the Year | Traditional Album of the Year |
| Karkwa, Dans la seconde; Corridor, Mimi; Galaxie, À demain peut-être; Éric Lapointe, Je marche dans ma vie; Population II, Électrons libres du Québec | La Bottine Souriante, Domino!; Nicolas Boulerice, Olivier Demers, and Robert Deveaux, Art populaire; Yves Lambert, Romance paradis; Nicolas Pellerin et les grands hurleurs, Layon; Les Rats d’Swompe, Pause Gorgée! Vol. 1 |
| World Music Album of the Year | Youth Album or DVD of the Year |
| Mônica Freire, Ilhada; Bel and Quinn, Donte sann yo; Boogat, Del horizonte; Masmoudi Quartette, Villes éternelles; Mikha.Elles, Camino de mujeres | Les Petites Tounes, Faut toujours faire comme les grands; Arthur l'Aventurier, Arthur l’Aventurier : les trésors du Maroc; Bon Débarras, J’m’en viens chez vous; Jérôme Charlebois, Petits mots pour grands enfants; Nicolas Noël, Le cristal du temps |
| Anglophone Concert of the Year | Comedy Concert of the Year |
| Charlotte Cardin, 99 Nights; Dominique Fils-Aimé, Roots; The Franklin Electric, Oh Brother; Matt Holubowski, Like Flowers on a Molten Lawn; Elliot Maginot, Easy Night | Adib Alkhalidey, Des putes et des voleurs; Marthe Laverdière, Marthe Laverdière fait son show!; Daniel Lemire, Daniel Lemire; Laurent Paquin, Crocodile distrait; Mathieu Pepper, En attendant la fête au village |
| Francophone Concert of the Year | Variety or Reinterpretation Concert of the Year |
| Salebarbes, À boire deboutte; Daniel Bélanger, Mercure en mai; Philippe Brach, Les gens qu'on aime; Pierre Flynn, Sur ma route; Karkwa, Dans la seconde; Pierre Lapointe, Chansons hivernales; Daniel Lavoie, Tension attention 40 ans; Bruno Pelletier, Miserere 25e anniversaire; Souldia, Non conventionnel; Alexandra Stréliski, Néo-Romance | Ariane Roy, Thierry Larose and Lou-Adriane Cassidy. Le Roy, La Rose et Le Lou[p]; The 7 Fingers, Pub Royal; Ludovick Bourgeois, Les BB par Ludovick Bourgeois; La famille Addams; Le Bodyguard |
| Most Successful Artist Outside Quebec | Video of the Year |
| Charlotte Cardin; Elisapie; Moonshine; Aliocha Schneider; Alexandra Stréliski | Les Cowboys Fringants, "La Fin du show"; Choses Sauvages, "Pression"; Corridor, "Jump Cut"; Karkwa, "Nouvelle vague"; Les Louanges,"Facile" |
