= Que du vent =

Studio album by Les Cowboys Fringants
- Released: 2011
- Genre: Alternative rock (néo-trad)
- Length: 41:09
- Label: La Tribu
- Producer: La Compagnie Larivée Cabot Champagne for Les Disques De La Tribu

Les Cowboys Fringants chronology
En concert au Zénith de Paris (2010)	Que du vent (2011)	Octobre (2015)

Que du vent is a studio album released in 2011 by Québécois néo-trad band Les Cowboys Fringants. It reached number 1 in Quebec music charts during the week of November 14–20, 2011, and peaked at number 60 on the charts in France for the week of November 21–27, 2011.

== Track listing ==
1. "Télé" – 3:59
2. "Paris-Montréal" – 3:11
3. "Marilou s'en fout" – 3:45
4. "L'horloge" – 3:58
5. "Que du vent" – 2:57
6. "Classe moyenne (avec anchois)" – 3:52
7. "Comme Joe Dassin" – 4:08
8. "Hasbeen" – 4:33
9. "Party!" – 2:43
10. "Shooters" – 4:38
11. "On tient l'coup" – 3:25

== Charts ==
Chart performance for Que du vent
Chart (2011)	Peak position
Belgian Albums (Ultratop Wallonia)	46
Canadian Albums (Billboard)	5
French Albums (SNEP)	60
Swiss Albums (Schweizer Hitparade)	58
