= Octobre (album) =

Studio album by Les Cowboys Fringants
- Released: 2015
- Genre: Alternative rock (néo-trad)
- Length: 50:54
- Label: La Tribu
- Producer: La Compagnie Larivée Cabot Champagne for Les Disques De La Tribu

Les Cowboys Fringants chronology
Que du vent (2011)	Octobre (2015)	Les antipodes (2019)

Octobre is a studio album released in 2015 by Québécois néo-trad band Les Cowboys Fringants. It reached number 1 in Quebec music charts during the week of October 23–29, 2015, and peaked at number 107 on the charts in France.

== Track listing ==
1. "Octobre" – 3:36
2. "Bye Bye Lou" – 3:41
3. "La la la" – 2:41
4. "Les vers de terre" – 4:17
5. "Pizza Galaxie" – 4:25
6. "Les feuilles mortes" – 3:59
7. "So So" – 3:08
8. "La cave" – 3:02
9. "Marine marchande" – 4:25
10. "Oktoberfest" – 1:02
11. "La dévisse" – 4:21
12. "Mon grand-père" – 4:16
13. "Louis Hébert" – 4:19
14. "Pub royal" – 3:42

== Charts ==
Chart performance for Octobre
Chart (2015)	Peak position
Belgian Albums (Ultratop Wallonia)	35
Canadian Albums (Billboard)	5
French Albums (SNEP)	107
Swiss Albums (Schweizer Hitparade)	20
