= Attache ta tuque! =

Live album by Les Cowboys Fringants
- Released: 2003
- Recorded: Montreal Dec. 2002
- Genre: Alternative rock (néo-trad)
- Label: La Tribu
- Producer: La Compagnie Larivée Cabot Champagne for Disques La Tribu

Les Cowboys Fringants chronology
Break syndical (2002)	Attache ta tuque! (2003)	La Grand-Messe (2004)

Attache ta tuque! is a 2003 double live album by Québécois néo-trad band Les Cowboys Fringants. This album also included a bonus video DVD with music videos and some shots from the live show.

== Track listing ==
=== Disc one ===
1. Heavy Metal
2. Québécois de souche
3. Le pouceux
4. Mon chum Rémi
5. Salut mon Ron!
6. Le temps perdu
7. Le gars d'la compagnie
8. Léopold
9. Le shack à Hector
10. Le plombier
11. Toune d'automne
12. Mon pays
13. Le reel des aristocrates
14. La tête à Papineau
15. Ruelle Laurier

=== Disc two ===
1. La manifestation
2. Maurice au bistro
3. Banlieue
4. La sainte paix
5. Robert Bob Bourgouin
6. Su' mon Big Wheel (C'tait l'fun)
7. Awikatchikaën
8. Le roi Katshé (1^{re} partie)
9. Joyeux calvaire
10. Le roi Katshé (2^{e} partie)
11. Impala Blues
12. En berne
13. L'hiver approche
14. Le toune cachée
15. Un p'tit tour
