= L'expédition =

Studio album by Les Cowboys Fringants
- Released: 23 September 2008
- Studio: Studio Victor, Studio Wild, and in L'Assomption
- Genre: Alternative rock (néo-trad)
- Length: 50:41
- Label: La Tribu
- Producer: La Compagnie Larivée Cabot Champagne for La Tribu records

Les Cowboys Fringants chronology
La Grand-Messe (2004)	L'expédition (2008)	Sur un air de déjà vu (2008)

L'expédition (French for 'the expedition') is an album by Les Cowboys Fringants. It was released in 2008 and reached the number one spot on the Quebec music charts.

== Background ==
L'expédition is the sixth album of Les Cowboys Fringants, and the first where the group only has four members, after the departure of Dominique Lebeau.

The album was released on September 23, 2008, and includes 14 tracks. All the tracks share the motif of the passing of time, with the album title itself symbolizing the journey of life. Compared to previous albums, the album is seen as more calm and melancholic.

Three singles from the album occupied first place on their release in the top 100 of Quebec radios: "Entre deux taxis" (for 9 weeks), "Tant qu'on aura de l'amour" (for 5 weeks), and "La Tête haute" (for 5 weeks).

== Track listing ==
All of the songs are written and composed by Jean-François Pauzé, except for the intro of "Les Hirondelles", which are by Marie-Annick Lépine.

No.	Title	Length
1.	"Droit devant"	4:45
2.	"Chêne et roseau"	2:12
3.	"Entre deux taxis"	3:32
4.	"La Catherine"	3:03
5.	"Histoire de pêche"	3:09
6.	"Bobo"	3:37
7.	"Rue des souvenirs"	2:50
8.	"Monsieur"	3:54
9.	"La tête haute"	4:32
10.	"Les hirondelles"	4:33
11.	"Tant qu'on aura de l'amour"	2:45
12.	"La bonne pomme"	3:29
13.	"Train de vie"	2:47
14.	"Une autre journée qui se lève"	5:33
Total length:		50:41

== Personnel ==
Les Cowboys Fringants

- Karl Tremblay – vocals
- Jean-François Pauzé – electric guitar, acoustic guitar, classic guitar, vocals
- Marie-Annick Lépine – violin, mandolin, accordion, piano, flute, viola, keyboard, cello, melodica, Gusli, vocals
- Jérôme Dupras – bass guitar, drums, electric guitar, banjo, vocals

Invited musicians

- Steve Gagné – percussion, drums (on song 1, 2, 3, 5, 7, and 14)
- Daniel Lacoste – electric guitar (on "Droit devant")

== Charts ==
Chart performance for L'expédition
Chart (2008)	Peak position
Belgian Albums (Ultratop Wallonia)	67
Canadian Albums (Billboard)	2
French Albums (SNEP)	32
Swiss Albums (Schweizer Hitparade)	79
