= Mon Pays (disambiguation) =

"Mon Pays" is a 1964 song by Gilles Vigneault.

Mon Pays may also refer to:

- "Mon Pays" (Faudel song), 2006
- Mon Pays, a boat of French-Canadian solo sailor Hubert Marcoux
- "Mon pays", track on 2000 album Motel Capri by Les Cowboys Fringants

== See also ==
- Mon pays le Québec, a Canadian political party
