= Pub Royal =

Studio album by Les Cowboys Fringants
- Released: April 25, 2024
- Genres: Country rock; folk rock
- Length: 42:44
- Label: La Tribu
- Producers: Daniel Lacoste; Gus van Go

Les Cowboys Fringants chronology
| En concert avec l'Orchestre symphonique de Montréal (sous la direction du chef Simon Leclerc) (2023) | Pub Royal (2024) |

Pub Royal is the 12th album by Canadian folk rock band Les Cowboys Fringants, released April 25, 2024, on La Tribu. The album includes the last six songs recorded by founding member and lead vocalist Karl Tremblay before his death in November 2023, as well as both vocal and instrumental songs recorded by the remaining band members to complete the album in February 2024.

The album shares its title with Pub Royal, a jukebox musical of the band's music staged by The 7 Fingers theatre company, which toured Quebec in 2023 and 2024.

== Chart performance ==
The album debuted at number 3 on the Canadian Albums Chart.

== Awards ==
The band and album won six Félix Awards at the 46th Félix Awards in November 2024, including Group of the Year, Songwriter of the Year, Alternative Album of the Year, Critic's Choice Album of the Year, and both Song of the Year and Video of the Year for "La Fin du show".

== Track listing ==
All songs written by Jean-François Pauzé, except "Les cheveux blancs" by Marie-Annick Lépine.

Pub Royal track listing
| No. | Title | Length |
|---|---|---|
| 1. | "Des espoirs de cause" | 1:03 |
| 2. | "Bienvenue chez nous" | 4:16 |
| 3. | "Loulou vs Loulou" | 5:14 |
| 4. | "Y'est 3 heures on ferme!" | 3:39 |
| 5. | "La Fin du show" | 7:16 |
| 6. | "On fait quoi maintenant?" | 1:20 |
| 7. | "Questions sans réponses" | 2:34 |
| 8. | "Vie et mort de Gina Pinard" | 4:23 |
| 9. | "Loulou (partie II)" | 1:04 |
| 10. | "(re)Bienvenue chez vous" | 2:24 |
| 11. | "Les cheveux blancs" | 3:44 |
| 12. | "Merci ben!" | 4:01 |
| 13. | "Les bonnes continuations" | 1:39 |
| Total length: | | 42:44 |
