= Sur un air de déjà vu =

Studio album by Les Cowboys Fringants
- Released: 2008
- Genre: Alternative rock (néo-trad)
- Length: 40:55
- Label: La Tribu
- Producer: La Compagnie Larivée-Cabot-Champagne for Les Disque De La Tribu

Les Cowboys Fringants chronology
L'expédition (2008)	Sur un air de déjà vu (2008)	En concert au Zénith de Paris (2010)

Sur un air de déjà vu is a studio album released in 2008 by Québécois néo-trad band Les Cowboys Fringants. This album mainly features songs with a lighter tone compared to the band's first few albums.

== Track listing ==
1. "Chanteur pop" – 4:27
2. "Beau-frère" – 3:05
3. "La ballade de Jipi Labrosse" – 1:31
4. "Sur un air de déjà vu" – 1:40
5. "Par chez nous" – 3:23
6. "Sans tambour ni trompette" – 0:26
7. "Normal Tremblay" – 2:26
8. "1994" – 3:45
9. "Pittoresque !" – 2:15
10. "Vacances 31" – 2:48
11. "Le blues d'la vie" – 1:26
12. "Titi Tancrède / Le reel d'la fesse" – 4:27
13. "Rentre à pied" – 2:44
14. "Quand tu pars" – 1:26
15. "Au pays des sapins géants" – 3:52
16. "Döner au suivant" – 1:14

== Charts ==
Chart performance for Sur un air de déjà vu
Chart (2009)	Peak position
Canadian Albums (Billboard)	8
French Albums (SNEP)	86
