= Disques Victoire =

Disques Victoire is a Canadian independent record label established in 1990 by Serge Brouillette in St-Césaire, Quebec specializing in recording and promoting French language artists.

== Notable artists ==
- Mes Aïeux
- Sylvain Cossette
- Luc De Larochellière
- Julie Masse
- Marie Denise Pelletier

== See also ==
- List of record labels
- List of Quebec record labels
- List of Quebec musicians
- Music of Quebec
- Culture of Quebec
