= Plus Rien =

Plus Rien may refer to:

- Plus Rien, a 2003 EP by Vanessa and the O's
- "Plus Rien", a song by Les Cowboys Fringants from the 2004 album La Grand-Messe
