= 1994 (disambiguation) =

1994 was a common year starting on Saturday of the Gregorian calendar.

1994 may also refer to:

- 1994 (number)
- 1994 (Merle Haggard album), 1994
- 1994 (Nathan Evans album), 2024
- 1994, a 2019 album by Skambankt
- "1994" (song), a 2013 song recorded by Jason Aldean
- "1994", a 2008 song by les Cowboys Frigants from Sur un air de déjà vu
- "1994", a 2018 song by Alec Benjamin from Narrated for You
- Nineteen Ninety-Four, a BBC Radio 4 comedy series
- Nineteen Ninety-Four (album), a 1994 album by Alvin Lee
- 1994 (Italian TV series), a 2019 Sky Atlantic TV series
- 1994 (Mexican TV series), a 2019 Netflix TV series
- 1994 a documentary about 1994 in Mexico including Colosio's assassination
- 1994 (magazine), a Warren comic book series
