= The 7 Fingers =

Canadian artist collective

The 7 Fingers (Les 7 Doigts)
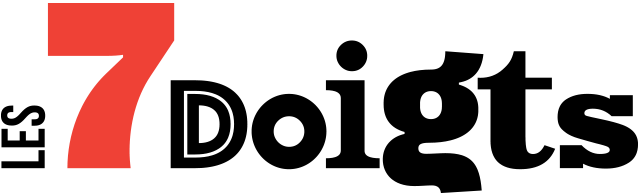
- Formation: 2002
- Founder: Shana Carroll, Isabelle Chassé, Patrick Léonard, Faon Shane, Gypsy Snider, Sébastien Soldevila, Samuel Tétreault
- Founded at: Montreal
- Purpose: Creation, production and touring of shows
- Headquarters: 2111 Boul. St Laurent. Montreal, Quebec, Canada
- Products: 2019 & 2025 “Passengers” 2024 "Duel Reality"; 2018 Temporel; 2017 Vice & Vertu; 2016 Réversible; 2016 Bosch Dreams; 2016 Princesse de Cirque; 2015 Triptyque; 2014 Cuisine & Confessions; 2014 Intersection; 2013 Le Murmure du coquelicot 2012 Séquence 8; 2012 Amuse; 2011 Patinoire; 2009 Psy; 2007 La Vie; 2007 Projet Fibonacci; 2006 Traces; 2002 Loft
- Website: 7fingers.com

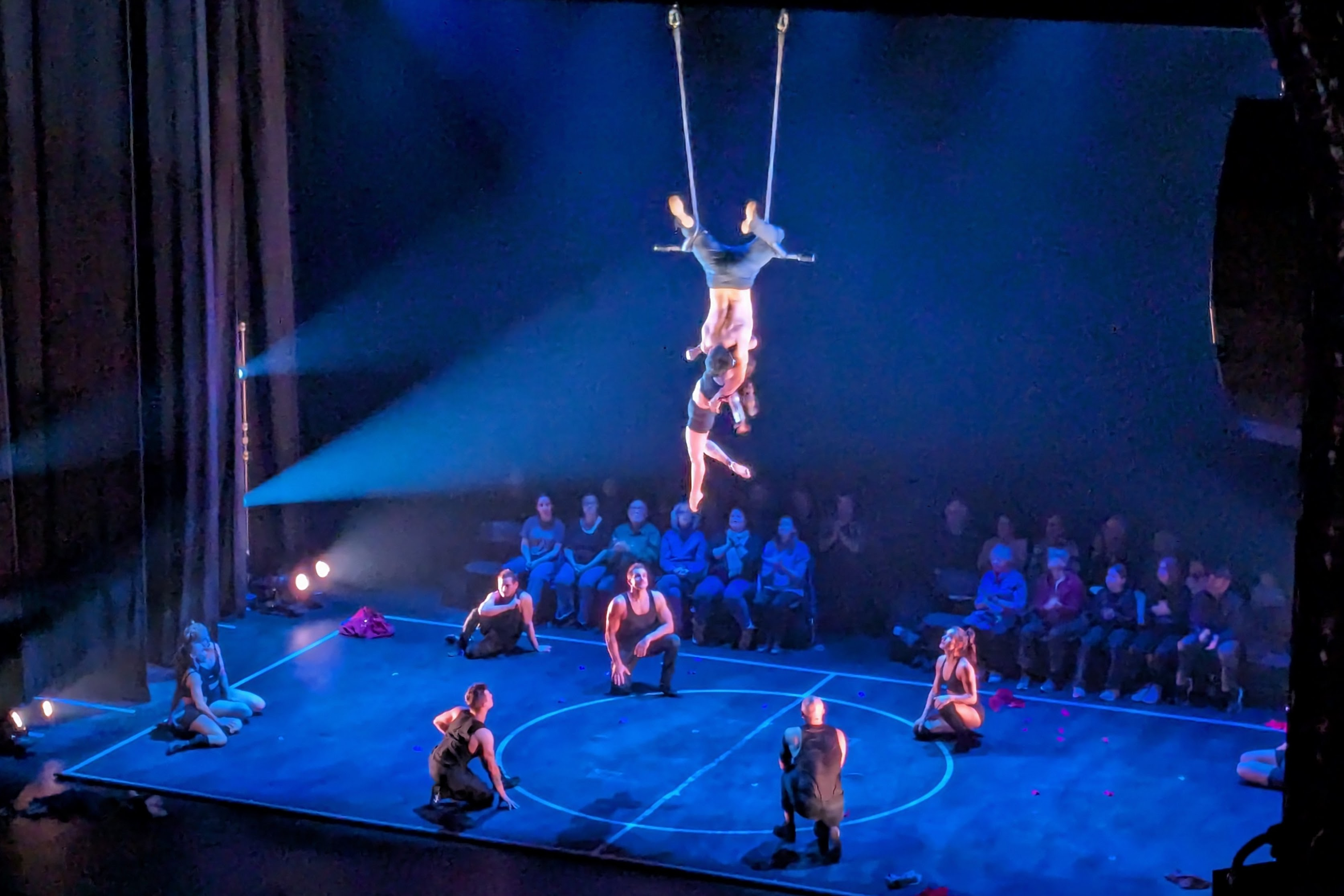
The 7 Fingers circus troupe performing an acrobatic act in the show "Duel Reality" in Boston, February 2024

The 7 Fingers is an artist collective based in Montreal, Quebec, Canada. The group is also known by its French name "Les 7 doigts de la main", which is sometimes shortened to "Les 7 Doigts".

== History ==
The 7 Fingers is a collective founded in 2002 by seven circus artists: Isabelle Chassé, Shana Carroll, Patrick Léonard, Faon Shane, Gypsy Snider, Sébastien Soldevila, and Samuel Tétreault.

Since 2003, the collective has been led by Nassib El-Husseini, a political scientist, author, and former advisor to numerous governmental and non-governmental organizations both in Canada and abroad.

On July 14, 2016, the collective created The 7 Fingers Foundation.

Until the end of 2017, the collective's headquarters were on 225 Roy East St. in Montreal. After 18 months of renovation work, The 7 Fingers moved to their new centre of creation and production, on 2111 Saint-Laurent boulevard, in the quartier des spectacles.

== Original and Touring shows ==
=== The Attic: Things I’ve Seen While Lying On My Back (2026) ===
The Attic received its world premiere at the Goodman Theatre in Chicago on September 5, 2026. Written and directed by Shana Carroll, the show is a memoir, that explores "the dreamlike quality of memory. . . .Accompanying the literal narrative is physical, visual and acrobatic language, rich with metaphor, aiming to tell a fuller story from all its visceral angles than any one of those forms could on its own." It is performed by "an international company of 11 circus artists, specialists in silks, trapeze, acrobatics, juggling, stilt-walking and more."

=== Passagers (2018) / Passengers (2025) ===
Passagers / Passengers is a show celebrating the Human and a reflection on the importance and the beauty of interpersonal relationships, mixing dance, physical expression, acrobatics, and projections, gathering six artists from all around the world, and accompanied by original musical compositions. The creation is directed by Shana Carroll, assisted by Isabelle Chassé. The world premiere of this work took place at the Tohu, in Montréal, on November 14, 2018. The show played at the American Repertory Theater in Cambridge, MA, under the name Passengers in 2025. The 2018 soundtrack was updated in 2021 and made available on Bandcamp.

=== Duel Reality (2024) ===
Duel Reality reframes Romeo & Juliette as an acrobatic competition between the Red House and the Blue House. Audience members are given a colored band at their seats so they can cheer for the appropriate House.

=== Patinoire (2011) ===
The company's first solo show, Patinoire, features The 7 Fingers' co-founder Patrick Léonard. It is directed by Patrick Léonard himself and assisted by Nicolas Cantin. The show was most recently shown for a month at the Festival d'Avignon in 2014.

In July 2008, Montreal artists from The 7 Fingers, and some Mexican artists from Cirko de Mente, went to the Canadian great north to meet with Inuit artists from Artcirq, in order to associate their arts and their talents. After two weeks of creation, the artists gave several shows in Nunavut.

A third stopover happened in Montreal in 2008 with the Mexican, inuit and Montrealer artists. The show continued on mutating.

In 2010, Barcelona hosts the residency of The Fibonacci Project for three weeks. The show is composed of seven Catalan artists and seven Quebecois artists.

In April 2016, The Project set camp in Marrakesh for two weeks. The show is composed of three Quebecois artists, seven Moroccan artists and three Guinean artists.

== Past original productions ==
=== Temporel (2018) ===
Temporel is a multidisciplinary show combining the universe of The 7 Fingers and the company Lemieux Pilon 4D Art, conceived and directed by Patrick Léonard, Isabelle Chassé, Michel Lemieux et Victor Pilon, and its choreography was created by Shana Carroll. Its world premiere took place at the Place des Arts(Montréal) on January 11, 2018.

=== Vice & Vertu (2017) ===
Directed by three of the collective's co-founders – Isabelle Chassé, Patrick Léonard, and Samuel Tétreault – Vice & Vertu was performed from July 10 to August 6, 2017, at the Société des Arts Technologiques (SAT) in Montreal as part of the city's 375th Anniversary Celebrations. Vice & Vertu was an immersive, three-hour, promenade-style performance for audiences 18 years and over. The production was a work of fiction heavily inspired by historic figures from 1920s to 1940s Montreal.

=== Bosch Dreams (2016) ===
Bosch Dreams pays tribute to the painter Jheronimus Bosch. The show was directed by Samuel Tétreault and coproduced by Theatre Republique (Denmark) upon an invitation from the festival Circolo (Netherland) with the support of Wilhelm Hansen Fonden and the Jheronimus Bosch 500 Foundation. The show was created for the 500 year-anniversary of the painter's death. The show premiered in September 2016 in Copenhagen. The show performed in France for the first time in November 2017 during the festival "Québec à La Villette" before touring there and abroad.

=== Réversible (2016) ===
Directed Gypsy Snider, Reversible was coproduced with the Théâtre du Gymnase-Bernardines (Marseille), Thomas Lightburn (Vancouver), and the Tohu (Montreal).

=== Triptyque (2015) ===
Under the artistic direction of Samuel Tétreault, The 7 Fingers partnered with three choreographers to create a performance composed of three acts:

- Anne & Samuel: a duo choreographed by Marie Chouinard.
- Variations 9.81: a handstand quintet staged by Victor Quijada (Groupe RUBBERBANDance).
- Nocturnes: a piece by Marcos Morau (La Véronal).

The show was coproduced by Sadler's Wells Theatre (London), Thomas Lightburn (Vancouver), the Tohu, la Cité des arts du cirque (Montreal), Albourne (Norwalk), and Danse-Cité (Montreal). The show's official premiere was at the TOHU on October 14, 2015.

=== Traces (2006–present) ===
The show had its world premiere in Montreal in January 2006, shortly before performing at the Commonwealth Games in Melbourne, Australia. With ten years and nearly 1900 shows to its name, Traces is considered one of the collective's biggest successes. In 2011, the show played for one year at Union Square Theatre in New York.

== Artistic collaborations ==
=== Peter Pan 360 (2015–2016) ===
In 2015, The 7 Fingers led the choreography and movement direction of Peter Pan 360 in the United States. Presented in the Threesixty Theatre, a 360-degree stage within a 100-foot high structure, Peter Pan was directed by Thom Sutherland with original music by Benjamin Wallfisch.

=== Pippin (2013–2017) ===
The choreography and integration of circus into the Broadway revival of the musical Pippin was entrusted to The 7 Fingers. In 2014, the show was performed 420 times at the Music Box Theatre in New York. Pippin also toured the US.

=== Pub Royal (2023–2024) ===
A jukebox musical based around the music of popular Quebec rock band Les Cowboys Fringants, launched around the time of the death of founding member Karl Tremblay. The band concurrently released the album Pub Royal in April 2024.

== Special events ==
- Olympic Games: Sochi 2014, Vancouver 2010, and Turin 2006
- Bench/ The Naked Truth (Manilla, 2014)

== Awards and recognitions ==
- January 2012: Gold medal at the Festival Mondial du Cirque de Demain in Paris for a Chinese pole number (an excerpt from the show PSY) performed by Héloïse Bourgeois and William Underwood.
