= Drama Desk Award for Outstanding Choreography =

American theatre award

- Awarded for: Outstanding Choreography
- Location: New York City
- Country: United States
- Presented by: Drama Desk
- First award: 1969
- Currently held by: Christopher Gattelli, Schmigadoon! & Omari Wiles and Arturo Lyons, Cats: The Jellicle Ball (2026)

The Drama Desk Award for Outstanding Choreography is an annual award presented by Drama Desk in recognition of achievements in the theatre across collective Broadway, off-Broadway and off-off-Broadway productions in New York City.

Kathleen Marshall, Susan Stroman and Tommy Tune have won the most awards in the category, with four wins each, followed closely by Michael Bennett and Bob Fosse, with three wins each. Susan Stroman also holds the record for most nominations in the category, with twelve, followed by Warren Carlyle with eight.

== Winners and nominees ==
Key

and bold indicates the winner.

=== 1960s ===
Year	Choreographer	Production	Ref.
1969
1969	**Grover Dale**	**Billy**	

=== 1970s ===
Year	Choreographer	Production	Ref.
1970
1970	**Ron Field**	**Applause**	
1971
1971	**Michael Bennett**	**Follies**	
1971	**Donald Saddler**	**No, No, Nanette**	
1972
1972	**Patricia Birch**	**Grease**	
1972	**Jean Erdman**	**Two Gentlemen of Verona**	
1973
1973	**Bob Fosse**	**Pippin**	
1974
1974	**Patricia Birch**	**Candide**	
1975
1975	**George Faison**	**The Wiz**	
1975	Dennis Denehy	The Lieutenant	
1975	Roger Morgan	Saturday, Sun, Moon	
1975	Donald Saddler	Good News	
1975	Margo Sappington	Where's Charley?	
1976
1976	**Michael Bennett**	**A Chorus Line**	
1976	Patricia Birch	Pacific Overtures	
1976	Donald Saddler	The Robber Bridegroom	
1976	Billy Wilson	Bubbling Brown Sugar	
1977
1977	**Peter Gennaro**	**Annie**	
1977	Patricia Birch	Music Is	
1977	Dan Siretta	Going Up	
1978
1978	**Bob Fosse**	**Dancin'**	
1978	Arthur Faria	Ain't Misbehavin'	
1978	Geoffrey Holder	Timbuktu!	
1978	Tommy Tune	The Best Little Whorehouse in Texas	
1979
1979	**Bob Avian and Michael Bennett**	**Ballroom**	
1979	Larry Fuller	Sweeney Todd: The Demon Barber of Fleet Street	
1979	Henry LeTang and Billy Wilson	Eubie!	
1979	Dan Siretta	Tip-Toes	

=== 1980s ===
Year	Choreographer	Production	Ref.
1980
1980	**Tommy Tune and Thommie Walsh**	**A Day in Hollywood / A Night in the Ukraine**	
1980	Larry Fuller	Evita	
1980	Mary Kyte	Tintypes	
1980	Joe Layton	Barnum	
1981
1981	**Gower Champion**	**42nd Street**	
1981	Graciela Daniele	The Pirates of Penzance	
1982	—N/a		
1983
1983	**Tommy Tune and Thommie Walsh**	**My One and Only**	
1983	Peter Martins and Donald Saddler	On Your Toes	
1984, 1985	—N/a		
1986
1986	**Bob Fosse**	**Big Deal**	
1986	Gene Kelly and Twyla Tharp	Singin' in the Rain	
1986	Peter Martins	Song and Dance	
1987	—N/a		
1988
1988	**Michael Smuin**	**Anything Goes**	
1988	Grover Dale	Mail	
1988	Gillian Lynne	The Phantom of the Opera	
1989	—N/a		

=== 1990s ===
Year	Choreographer	Production	Ref.
1990
1990	**Tommy Tune**	**Grand Hotel**	
1991
1991	**Tommy Tune**	**The Will Rogers Follies**	
1991	Michael Lichtefeld	The Secret Garden	
1991	Dan Siretta	Oh, Kay!	
1991	Susan Stroman	And the World Goes 'Round	
1992
1992	**Susan Stroman**	**Crazy for You**	
1992	Hope Clarke, Gregory Hines and Ted L. Levy	Jelly's Last Jam	
1992	Christopher Chadman	Guys and Dolls	
1993
1993	**Wayne Cilento**	**The Who's Tommy**	
1993	Michael Leeds	Hello Muddah, Hello Faddah!	
1993	Niarupama Nityanandan, Catherine Schaub and Simon Abkarian	Les Atrides	
1993	Luis Stazo	Tango Pasion	
1994
1994	**Jane Elliott and Kenneth MacMillan**	**Carousel**	
1994	Jeff Calhoun	Grease	
1994	Graciela Daniele	Hello Again	
1994	Rob Marshall	She Loves Me	
1994	Matt West	Beauty and the Beast	
1995	—N/a		
1996
1996	**Savion Glover**	**Bring in 'da Noise, Bring in 'da Funk**	
1996	Graciela Daniele	Chronicle of a Death Foretold	
1996	Ghettoriginal Productions	Jam on the Groove	
1996	Kathleen Marshall	Swinging on a Star	
1996	Susan Stroman	Big: the musical	
1997
1997	**Ann Reinking**	**Chicago**	
1997	Dein Perry	Tap Dogs	
1997	Susan Stroman	Steel Pier	
1998
1998	**Garth Fagan**	**The Lion King**	
1998	Graciela Daniele	Ragtime	
1998	The Forever Tango Dancers	Luis Bravo's Forever Tango	
1998	Rob Marshall	Cabaret	
1999
1999	**Matthew Bourne**	**Matthew Bourne's Swan Lake**	
1999	Patricia Birch	Parade	
1999	Rob Marshall	Little Me	

=== 2000s ===
Year	Choreographer	Production	Ref.
2000
2000	**Susan Stroman**	**Contact**	
2000	Jody Abrahams and Loukmaan Adams	Kat and the Kings	
2000	Mark Dendy	The Wild Party	
2000	Kathleen Marshall	Kiss Me, Kate	
2000	Susan Stroman	The Music Man	
2000	Lynne Taylor-Corbett	Swing!	
2001
2001	**Susan Stroman**	**The Producers**	
2001	John Carrafa	Urinetown	
2001	Jerry Mitchell	The Full Monty	
2001	Jerry Mitchell	The Rocky Horror Show	
2001	Randy Skinner	42nd Street	
2002
2002	**Susan Stroman**	**Oklahoma!**	
2002	Rob Ashford	Thoroughly Modern Millie	
2002	Christopher Wheeldon	Sweet Smell of Success	
2003
2003	**Twyla Tharp**	**Movin' Out**	
2003	Jerry Mitchell	Hairspray	
2003	Ken Roberson	Harlem Song	
2003	Tommy Tune	Tommy Tune: White Tie and Tails	
2004
2004	**Kathleen Marshall**	**Wonderful Town**	
2004	Stephen Hues	Ramayana 2K3	
2004	Jerry Mitchell	Never Gonna Dance	
2004	Anthony Van Laast and Farah Khan	Bombay Dreams	
2005
2005	**Jerry Mitchell**	**La Cage aux Folles**	
2005	Matthew Bourne	Play Without Words	
2005	Christopher Gattelli	Altar Boyz	
2005	Barry McNabb	Sailor's Song	
2005	Jerry Mitchell	Dirty Rotten Scoundrels	
2005	Casey Nicholaw	Monty Python's Spamalot	
2006
2006	**Kathleen Marshall**	**The Pajama Game**	
2006	Rob Ashford	The Wedding Singer	
2006	Angela Chang	Golden Dragon Acrobats	
2006	Graciela Daniele	Bernarda Alba	
2006	Casey Nicholaw	The Drowsy Chaperone	
2006	Sergio Trujillo	Jersey Boys	
2007
2007	**Andy Blankenbuehler**	**In the Heights**	
2007	Patricia Birch	LoveMusik	
2007	Matthew Bourne	Edward Scissorhands	
2007	Matthew Bourne and Stephen Mear	Mary Poppins	
2007	Bill T. Jones	Spring Awakening	
2007	Jerry Mitchell	Legally Blonde	
2008
2008	**Rob Ashford**	**Cry-Baby**	
2008	Karole Armitage	Passing Strange	
2008	Shana Carroll and Gypsy Snider	Traces	
2008	Dan Knechtges	Xanadu	
2008	Peter Pucci	Queens Boulevard: The Musical	
2008	Susan Stroman	Young Frankenstein	
2009
2009	**Peter Darling**	**Billy Elliot the Musical**	
2009	Karole Armitage	Hair	
2009	Andy Blankenbuehler	9 to 5	
2009	Bill T. Jones	Fela!	
2009	Randy Skinner	Irving Berlin's White Christmas	
2009	Lynne Taylor-Corbett and Shonn Wiley	My Vaudeville Man!	

=== 2010s ===
Year	Choreographer	Production	Ref.
2010
2010	**Twyla Tharp**	**Come Fly Away**	
2010	Warren Carlyle	Finian's Rainbow	
2010	Marcia Milgrom Dodge	Ragtime	
2010	Lynne Page	La Cage aux Folles	
2010	Susan Stroman	The Scottsboro Boys	
2010	Sergio Trujillo	Memphis	
2011
2011	**Kathleen Marshall**	**Anything Goes**	
2011	Rob Ashford	How to Succeed in Business Without Really Trying	
2011	Scott Graham and Steven Hoggett	Beautiful Burnout	
2011	Steven Hoggett	Peter and the Starcatchers	
2011	Casey Nicholaw	The Book of Mormon	
2011	Siudy	Between Worlds	
2012
2012	**Christopher Gattelli**	**Newsies**	
2012	Rob Ashford	Evita	
2012	Warren Carlyle	Follies	
2012	Breandan de Gallal	Noctu	
2012	Kathleen Marshall	Nice Work If You Can Get It	
2012	Sergio Trujillo	Leap of Faith	
2013
2013	**Chet Walker and Gypsy Snider**	**Pippin**	
2013	Andy Blankenbuehler	Bring It On: The Musical	
2013	Warren Carlyle	A Christmas Story: The Musical	
2013	Peter Darling	Matilda the Musical	
2013	Josh Rhodes	Rodgers + Hammerstein's Cinderella	
2013	Sergio Trujillo	Hands on a Hardbody	
2014
2014	**Warren Carlyle**	**After Midnight**	
2014	Steven Hoggett and Kelly Devine	Rocky the Musical	
2014	Danny Mefford	Love's Labour's Lost	
2014	Casey Nicholaw	Aladdin	
2014	Susan Stroman	Bullets Over Broadway	
2014	Sonya Tayeh	Kung Fu	
2015
2015	**Christopher Wheeldon**	**An American in Paris**	
2015	Joshua Bergasse	On the Town	
2015	Warren Carlyle	On the Twentieth Century	
2015	Steven Hoggett	The Last Ship	
2015	Austin McCormick	Rococo Rouge	
2015	Casey Nicholaw	Something Rotten!	
2016
2016	**Savion Glover**	**Shuffle Along**	
2016	Joshua Bergasse	Cagney	
2016	Spencer Liff	Spring Awakening	
2016	Lynne Page	American Psycho	
2016	Randy Skinner	Dames at Sea	
2017
2017	**Andy Blankenbuehler**	**Bandstand**	
2017	Warren Carlyle	Hello, Dolly!	
2017	Aletta Collins	The Hairy Ape	
2017	Kelly Devine	Come from Away	
2017	Denis Jones	Holiday Inn	
2018
2018	**Justin Peck**	**Carousel**	
2018	Camille A. Brown	Once on This Island	
2018	Christopher Gattelli	SpongeBob SquarePants	
2018	Casey Nicholaw	Mean Girls	
2018	Nejla Y. Yatkin	The Boy Who Danced on Air	
2019
2019	**Warren Carlyle**	**Kiss Me, Kate**	
2019	Camille A. Brown	Choir Boy	
2019	Denis Jones	Tootsie	
2019	Lorin Latarro	Twelfth Night	
2019	Rick and Jeff Kuperman	Alice by Heart	
2019	David Neumann	Hadestown	

=== 2020s ===
Year	Choreographer	Production	Ref.
2020
2020	**Sonya Tayeh**	**Moulin Rouge!**	
2020	Camille A. Brown	for colored girls who have considered suicide/when the rainbow is enuf	
2020	Anne Teresa De Keersmaeker	West Side Story	
2020	Keone Madrid and Mari Madrid	Beyond Babel	
2020	Kathleen Marshall	The Unsinkable Molly Brown	
2020	Travis Wall	The Wrong Man	
2021	No awards: New York theatres shuttered, March 2020 to September 2021, due to the COVID-19 pandemic in New York City		
2022
2022	**Bill T. Jones, Garrett Coleman and Jason Oremus, Gelan Lambert and Chloe Davis**	**Paradise Square**	
2022	Ayodele Casel (tap choreography)	Funny Girl	
2022	Carrie-Anne Ingrouille	Six	
2022	Liam Steel	Company	
2022	Christopher Wheeldon, Michael Balderrama (associate), Rich + Tone Talauega (Michael Jackson movement)	MJ	
2023	**Casey Nicholaw**	**Some Like It Hot**	
2023	Andy Blankenbuehler	Only Gold	
2023	Tislarm Bouie	the bandaged place	
2023	Edgar Godineaux	The Harder They Come	
2023	Susan Stroman	New York, New York	
2023	Jenifer Weber	KPOP	
2024	**Justin Peck**	**Illinoise**	
2024	Camille A. Brown	Hell's Kitchen	
2024	Graciela Daniele and Alex Sanchez	The Gardens of Anuncia	
2024	Jeff Kuperman and Rick Kuperman	The Outsiders	
2024	Lorin Latarro	The Heart of Rock and Roll	
2024	Jesse Robb and Shana Carroll	Water for Elephants	
2025
2025	**Jerry Mitchell**	Boop! The Musical	
2025	Camille A. Brown	Gypsy	
2025	Warren Carlyle	Pirates! The Penzance Musical	
2025	Jacob Karr	Ain't Done Bad	
2025	Arturo Lyons and Omari Wiles	Cats: The Jellicle Ball	
2025	Sergio Trujillo	Real Women Have Curves	
2026 (tie)
2026 (tie)	**Christopher Gattelli**	**Schmigadoon!**	
2026 (tie)	**Omari Wiles and Arturo Lyons**	**Cats: The Jellicle Ball**	
2026 (tie)	Edgar Godineaux and Jared Grimes	Lights Out: Nat “King” Cole	
2026 (tie)	Natalie Malotke, Jonathan Platero and Oksana Platero	Blood/Love	
2026 (tie)	Toran X. Moore	Try/Step/Trip	
2026 (tie)	Lauren Yalango-Grant and Christopher Cree Grant	The Lost Boys	

== Statistics ==
=== Multiple wins ===
4 wins

- Kathleen Marshall
- Susan Stroman
- Tommy Tune

3 wins

- Michael Bennett
- Bob Fosse

2 wins

- Patricia Birch
- Andy Blankenbuehler
- Warren Carlyle
- Savion Glover
- Justin Peck
- Twyla Tharp
- Thommie Walsh
- Jerry Mitchell

=== Multiple nominations ===
12 nominations

Susan Stroman

8 nominations

- Warren Carlyle

7 nominations

- Kathleen Marshall
- Jerry Mitchell
- Casey Nicholaw

6 nominations

- Tommy Tune
- Patricia Birch
- Graciela Daniele

5 nominations

- Andy Blankenbuehler
- Rob Ashford
- Sergio Trujillo
- Camille A. Brown

4 nominations

- Steven Hoggett
- Donald Saddler
- Matthew Bourne
- Christopher Gattelli

3 nominations

- Michael Bennett
- Bob Fosse
- Twyla Tharp
- Rob Marshall
- Christopher Wheeldon
- Randy Skinner
- Dan Siretta

2 nominations

- Savion Glover
- Justin Peck
- Thommie Walsh
- Peter Darling
- Lorin Latarro
- Kelly Devine
- Sonya Tayeh
- Karole Armitage
- Grover Dale
- Peter Martins
- Lynne Taylor-Corbett

== See also ==
- Laurence Olivier Award for Best Theatre Choreographer
- Tony Award for Best Choreography
- Outer Critics Circle Award for Outstanding Choreography
- Lucille Lortel Award for Outstanding Choreographer
