= Break syndical =

Studio album by Les Cowboys Fringants
- Released: 2002
- Recorded: Studio 270
- Genre: Alternative rock (néo-trad)
- Label: La Tribu
- Producer: La Compagnie Larivée Cabot Champagne for La Tribu records

Les Cowboys Fringants chronology
Motel Capri (2000)	Break syndical (2002)	La Grand-Messe (2004)

Break syndical is the fourth album by Québécois néo-trad band Les Cowboys Fringants.

== Track listing ==
1. En berne (Pauzé) – 4:08
2. La tête à Papineau (Pauzé, Lépine) – 4:30
3. Toune d'automne (Pauzé, Lepine) – 3:34
4. Heavy metal (Pauzé, Lepine) – 3:40
5. La manifestation (Pauzé) – 3:21
6. Break syndical (Lebeau, Lepine) – 2:45
7. L'hiver approche (Pauzé, Lepine) – 5:23
8. À' polyvalente (Pauzé) – 1:12
9. La Noce – 3:56
10. Quand je r'garde (Lepine) – 1:52
11. Mon chum Rémi (Pauzé) – 4:00
12. Salut mon Ron (Pauzé) – 4:05
13. Joyeux calvaire ! (Pauzé, Lepine) – 3:17
14. Ruelle laurier (Tremblay) – 4:47

Hidden track: La toune cachée (Lebeau)

== Credits ==
=== Members ===
- Karl Tremblay: Lead Singer
- Jean-François "J-F" Pauzé: vocals, guitars, harmonica
- Marie-Annick Lépine: violin, cello, mandolin, accordion, piano, Keyboard/Synthesizer, vocal
- Jérôme Dupras bass guitar, vocal
- Dominique Lebeau: drums, ocarina, xylophone

=== Guest musicians ===
- Vincent Gagnon: Trombone (L'hiver approche, La noce), Euphonium (Mon chum rémi)
- Jacynthe Lepon: Trumpet (L'hiver approche, La noce)
- Steve Bergeron: Guitar solo on Heavy Metal

=== Additional Credits (Booklet) ===
- Recorded between August 2001 and January 2002 at Studio 270 (Outremont)
- Realization: Les Cowboys Fringants and Robert Langlois
- Musical Arrangement: Each cowboys makes their own arrangements
- Sound: Robert Langlois
- Mixing: Robert Langlois assisted by Claude Larivée
- Mastering: Jim Rabchuck, Audiobec
- Graphics: Jo-Anne Bolduc

==== Special Thanks ====
- Etienne St-Cyr-Proulx for its guitar and amplifier
- Luc Cabana for his mandolin
- Marc Desjarding for his availability and devotion
- Michel Girard and his wife Marie-Claude

Follows a special note about 'Motel Capri' that helped Les Cowboys Fringants in numerous projects since 1997, noting that Motel Capri, a small business from their native region is not afraid to invest time and money into Quebec culture.

== Songfacts ==
=== En Berne ===
A denunciation anthem that proved to be one of the group's biggest hits. It attacks the Québécois political apathy of the present, (regarding the environment and Quebec independence), State gambling and the cynicism of the government regarding poverty. If this is modern Quebec, well I put my flag at half mast, and the clowns that govern us can all get bent; If you're happy with this country (Quebec), well my man that's your opinion, you must be the CEO of some company! (listen)

=== Toune d'automne ===
A piece where the singer speaks fondly to a sister that has come back from a trip to English Canada. Singer Karl Tremblay famously likes to make a humorous political statement on stage by replacing the verse Promise me that this time, you're staying home for good by Promise me that you didn't turn into a federalist, little dammit! (listen)

=== La Manifestation ===
It comically chronicles a public protest, led by a guy that thought he was Castro, that ends up being a major disappointment and disillusionment. (listen)

=== L'Hiver Approche ===
A nice song about a guy saying that winter is coming, and will be hard this year. He's referring to the tough winters we experience in Quebec. Notice he also complains about an overconsumption society during almost the whole song saying Santa Claus has just arrived, We're not even in mid-November and other arguments against capitalist society.

=== Quand je r'garde ===
A romantic but upbeat song, the only one on this album to have been sung (as main, not backing vocals) by female member Marie-Annick Lépine.

== Year-end charts ==
Year-end chart performance for Break syndical
Chart (2002)	Position
Canadian Albums (Nielsen SoundScan)	97
