= List of Quebec record labels =

This is a list of notable record labels from Quebec.

- Alien8 Recordings
- Ambiances Magnétiques
- Audiogram
- Arbutus Records
- Bonsound Records
- Constellation Records
- Dare to Care Records
- Distribution Select
- Disques Victoire
- High Life Music
- Justin Time Records
- Kannibalen Records
- La Tribu
- Mille Pattes Records
- Og Music
- P572
- Relentless Records
- Secret City Records
- Stomp Records
- Zéro Musique

== See also ==
- List of Quebec musicians
- Music of Quebec
- Culture of Quebec
