= Pippin (musical) =

Musical with music and lyrics by Stephen Schwartz

- Original Cast Recording
- Music: Stephen Schwartz
- Lyrics: Stephen Schwartz
- Book: Roger O. Hirson; Bob Fosse (additional material)
- Basis: Fictitious life of Pippin the Hunchback, son of Charlemagne
- Productions: 1972 Broadway; 1973 West End; 1974 First US Tour; 1977 Second US Tour; 2006 Third US Tour; 2013 Broadway revival 2014 Fourth US tour
- Awards: Tony Award for Best Revival of a Musical

Pippin is a 1972 musical with music and lyrics by Stephen Schwartz and book by Roger O. Hirson. Bob Fosse, who directed the original Broadway production, also contributed to the libretto. The musical uses the premise of a mysterious performance troupe, led by the Leading Player, to tell the story of Pippin, a young prince on his search for meaning and significance. The fourth wall is broken numerous times during most traditional productions.

The protagonist, Pippin, and his father, Charlemagne, are characters derived from two historical figures of the early Middle Ages, though the plot is fictional and presents no historical accuracy regarding either. Much of the plot is an allegory for the Vietnam War and the counterculture that defined American society at the time of the show's development. The show was partially financed by Motown Records. As of December 2025, the original run of Pippin is the 40th longest-running Broadway show.

Ben Vereen and Patina Miller won Tony Awards for their portrayals of the Leading Player in the original Broadway production and the 2013 revival, respectively, making them the first actors to win Tonys for Best Leading Actor and Best Leading Actress in a Musical, for the same role.

== Background ==
Pippin was originally conceived as a student musical, Pippin, Pippin, performed by Carnegie Mellon University's Scotch'n'Soda theatre troupe. Stephen Schwartz collaborated with Ron Strauss, but when Schwartz decided to develop the show further, Strauss left the project. Schwartz has said that not a single line or note from Carnegie Mellon's Pippin made it into the final version.

== Synopsis ==
=== Act 1 ===
A traveling performance troupe of Players led by a Leading Player invites the audience to witness their show, promising a spectacular experience ("Magic to Do"). They begin telling the story of Pippin (his actor is described as a new Player making his stage debut), the first son of Frankish King Charlemagne. After a brief overview of his life from birth to young adulthood, Pippin, a recent university graduate, sings of his search for his purpose in life ("Corner of the Sky"). Pippin returns home to his father's castle and estate, where Charlemagne and Pippin's reunion is constantly interrupted by nobles, soldiers, and courtiers vying for Charlemagne's attention ("Welcome Home"). Pippin also meets with his ambitious stepmother Fastrada, and her strong but dim-witted son Lewis. Charlemagne and Lewis are going to battle against the Visigoths soon, and Pippin begs his father to take him along as a soldier to prove himself. Charlemagne reluctantly agrees and explains the battle plan to his men ("War is a Science"), interrupted repeatedly by an over-enthusiastic Pippin.

The Players express the battle through song and dance, with the Leading Player and two lead dancers in the middle (performing Bob Fosse's famous "Manson Trio") and the actual violence in the background ("Glory"). Charlemagne declares victory and leads his army off to the next battle. A disillusioned Pippin has a cynical discussion with an enemy soldier's severed head, recognizing the futility of war. He flees to the countryside as the Leading Player sings of the pleasures of a free and easy life ("Simple Joys"), then meets with Berthe, his paternal grandmother, exiled by Fastrada. She tells Pippin to stop worrying about his future and enjoy the pleasures and comforts of the present ("No Time at All"). Pippin takes this advice to heart and searches for more lighthearted pastimes. He enjoys many sexual encounters but soon becomes overwhelmed by their meaninglessness and forces all the women away ("With You").

The Leading Player suggests to Pippin that fulfillment can be found in fighting against Charlemagne's tyrannical ways, and Pippin plots a revolution against his father. Fastrada learns of Pippin's plan and devises one of her own: if Pippin either successfully kills Charlemagne, or fails and is arrested for treason, Lewis will be next in line for the throne either way. She manipulates Charlemagne into going to his annual prayer early, and she tells Pippin that he will be at the chapel unarmed ("Spread a Little Sunshine"). At the royal chapel at Arles, Pippin confronts his father, who justifies his cruelty and tyranny as necessary to achieve peace and prosperity for the realm. He then resigns to his fate, and after Pippin assassinates him, the people rejoice and bow to their new king ("Morning Glow"). The Leading Player informs the audience that the actors will break for now, but assures them they will enjoy the finale. (Note: The original Broadway production was performed in one act, without an intermission. Subsequent productions ended the first act after Charlemagne came back to life before "On the Right Track" until the Broadway revival. The original ending showed the Players attempting to perform the finale before Pippin unexpectedly exits the stage. The Leading Player then angrily reassures the audience that the performance will continue.)

=== Act 2 ===
As king, Pippin brings peace to the land by giving to the poor, eradicating taxes, ending the military, and peacefully settling foreign disputes. However, this soon falls apart, as Pippin is forced to go back on many of his promises, reverting to Charlemagne's ways. At Pippin's request, the Leading Player revives Charlemagne, who takes the throne back, and Pippin is left discouraged, as his life is still unfulfilled. The Leading Player counsels him to keep going down his life's path ("On the Right Track"), but after experimenting with art and religion, Pippin falls into monumental despair and collapses on the floor.

Widowed farm-owner Catherine finds him on the street, and is genuinely attracted to him ("And There He Was"), to the Leading Player's concern. Introducing herself ("Kind of Woman"), she has Pippin help as a farmhand on her estate. Pippin thinks himself above such things ("Extraordinary"), but after comforting her son, Theo, on the sickness and eventual death of his pet duck ("Prayer for a Duck"), he falls in love with Catherine ("Love Song"). As time goes by, Pippin grows too comfortable in monotony and leaves the estate to continue searching for his true purpose. Catherine is heartbroken and reflects on him, spontaneously beginning a song that was not initially in the script, to the Leading Player's anger and surprise ("I Guess I'll Miss the Man").

The Leading Player and the troupe find Pippin alone and tell him that the only fulfilling thing is their planned finale, in which Pippin will commit suicide by lighting himself on fire for one burst of glory. At the last moment, he realizes that there must be something more to life and chooses not to follow through. Catherine and Theo enter, defying the script, and stand beside Pippin. He realizes that his purpose was never to achieve greatness or glory, but rather to live an ordinary life ("Finale"/"Magic Shows and Miracles"). The furious Leading Player calls off the show and tells the rest of the Players and the orchestra to pack up, abandoning Pippin, Catherine, and Theo on a truly empty stage. Pippin is left devoid of anything extraordinary but finally feels fulfilled.

=== Extended ending ===
The "Theo ending" was originally conceived in 1998 by Mitch Sebastian, and is included in all newer productions of Pippin, including the 2013 Broadway revival. After the Players shun Pippin for not performing the grand finale, and he avers his contentment with a simple life with Catherine, Theo remains alone on stage and sings a verse of "Corner of the Sky", after which the Leading Player and the Players return, backed by the "Magic to Do" melody, implying that the existential crisis at the heart of the play is part of a cycle and will now continue, but with Theo as the Players' replacement for Pippin. Current productions vary between the two possible endings, though Schwartz himself has expressed his preference for the newer ending. This is also the ending used in most licensed versions of the musical.

== Musical numbers ==
Though Pippin is written to be performed in one act and its single-arc structure does not easily accommodate an intermission, many performances are broken into two acts. In the two-act version currently licensed by Musical Theatre International, the intermission comes after "Morning Glow", with an Act I finale – an abridged version of "Magic to Do" – inserted after Charles' murder. As with the new ending, the intermission can be added at the director's discretion without additional permission required. The 2013 Broadway revival is performed with an intermission.

=== Original Broadway production ===
- "Magic to Do" – Leading Player and The Players
- "Corner of the Sky" – Pippin
- "Welcome Home" – Charlemagne and Pippin
- "War Is a Science" – Charlemagne, Pippin, and Soldiers
- "Glory" – Leading Player and Soldiers
- "Simple Joys" – Leading Player
- "No Time at All" – Berthe and The Gang
- "With You" – Pippin
- "Spread a Little Sunshine" – Fastrada
- "Morning Glow" – Pippin and The Players
- "On the Right Track" – Leading Player and Pippin
- "Kind of Woman" – Catherine and The Players
- "Extraordinary" – Pippin
- "Prayer for a Duck" – Pippin
- "Love Song" – Pippin and Catherine
- "I Guess I'll Miss the Man" – Catherine
- "Finale" – Leading Player, Fastrada, Pippin, and The Players

=== 2013 Broadway revival ===
Act I

- "Magic to Do" – Leading Player, Players
- "Corner of the Sky" – Pippin
- "War Is a Science" – Charlemagne, Pippin, Soldiers
- "Glory" – Leading Player, Soldiers
- "Simple Joys" – Leading Player
- "No Time at All" – Berthe, Players
- "With You" – Pippin
- "Spread a Little Sunshine" – Fastrada
- "Morning Glow" – Pippin, Leading Player, Players

Act II

- "Entr'acte" – Players
- "On the Right Track" – Leading Player, Pippin
- "And There He Was" – Catherine
- "Kind of Woman" – Catherine, Ensemble
- "Extraordinary" – Pippin
- "Prayer for a Duck" – Pippin, Theo †
- "Love Song" – Pippin, Catherine
- "I Guess I'll Miss the Man" – Catherine
- "Finale/Magic Shows and Miracles" – Leading Player, Lewis, Pippin, and Ensemble
- "Corner of the Sky (Reprise)" – Theo €

Notes

€ - Included as part of the "Finale" track on the Cast Recording † - Not included in the Cast Recording

=== Licensed version ===
Act I

- "Magic to Do" – Leading Player, Fastrada, Berthe, Lewis, Charlemagne, and Ensemble
- "Corner of the Sky" – Pippin
- "War Is a Science" – Charlemagne, Pippin, and Soldiers
- "Glory" – Leading Player and Soldiers
- "Simple Joys" – Leading Player
- "No Time at All" – Berthe and Ensemble
- "With You" – Pippin
- "Spread a Little Sunshine" – Fastrada, Lewis, Ensemble
- "Morning Glow" – Pippin, Leading Player and Ensemble

Act II

- "Entr'acte" – Ensemble
- "On the Right Track" – Leading Player and Pippin
- "There He Was" – Catherine
- "Kind of Woman" – Catherine and Ensemble
- "Extraordinary" – Pippin
- "Prayer for a Duck" – Pippin, Theo, and Catherine
- "Love Song" – Pippin and Catherine
- "I Guess I'll Miss the Man" – Catherine
- "Finale" – Leading Player, Lewis, Pippin, and Ensemble
- "Theo's Corner"§ – Theo and Ensemble

In the original 1972 production, Fosse planned to use Stephen Schwartz's songs "Marking Time" and "Just Between the Two of Us", but before the show opened on Broadway the songs were replaced with "Extraordinary" and "Love Song" respectively. The songs "Spread a Little Sunshine" and "On the Right Track" were added to the show during its rehearsal period at the request of Bob Fosse. "And There He Was" was cut from the show before it made it to Broadway, but was incorporated into all future revisions.

== Notable casts ==
Character	Broadway	West End	US National Tour	Broadway Revival	US National Tour 2017 National Tour
Character	1972	1973	1977	2013	2014
Pippin	John Rubinstein	Paul Jones	Michael Rupert	Matthew James Thomas	Matthew James Thomas
Leading Player	Ben Vereen	Northern Calloway	Larry Riley	Patina Miller	Sasha Allen
Berthe	Irene Ryan (Note: Ryan played the role of Berthe until her stroke in March 1973, dying six weeks later in Santa Monica.)	Elisabeth Welch	Thelma Carpenter	Andrea Martin	Lucie Arnaz
Catherine	Jill Clayburgh	Patricia Hodge	Alexandra Borrie	Rachel Bay Jones	Kristine Reese
Charlemagne	Eric Berry	John Turner	Eric Berry	Terrence Mann	John Rubinstein
Fastrada	Leland Palmer	Diane Langton	Antonia Ellis	Charlotte d'Amboise	Sabrina Harper
Theo	Shane Nickerson	Nicky Cheesman; Peter Hall	Shamus Barnes	Andrew Cekala	Andrew Cekala
Lewis	Christopher Chadman	Bobby Bannerman	Jerry Colker	Erik Altemus	Erik Altemus

Original Broadway Replacements:

- Pippin: Walter Willison, Michael Rupert, Dean Pitchford
- Leading Player: Samuel E. Wright, Northern J. Calloway, Ben Harney, Larry Riley
- Berthe: Dorothy Stickney
- Catherine: Betty Buckley, Joy Franz
- Fastrada: Priscilla Lopez, Patti Karr

Broadway Revival:

- Pippin: Kyle Dean Massey, Josh Kaufman
- Leading Player: Ciara Renée, Carly Hughes, Ariana DeBose
- Berthe: Tovah Feldshuh, Annie Potts, Priscilla Lopez
- Charlemagne: John Rubinstein, Christopher Sieber, John Dossett

== Productions ==
=== Original Broadway production ===
The show premiered at the Imperial Theater on October 23, 1972, and ran for 1,944 performances before closing on June 12, 1977. It was directed and choreographed by Bob Fosse. The original cast was led by Ben Vereen as Leading Player, John Rubinstein as Pippin, Eric Berry as Charlemagne, Leland Palmer as Fastrada, Christopher Chadman as Lewis, Irene Ryan as Berthe, Jill Clayburgh as Catherine, and Shane Nickerson as Theo. On March 10, 1973 Irene Ryan suffered an apparent stroke on stage while singing "No Time at All" - she passed away a few weeks later.

Clive Barnes commented for The New York Times, "It is a commonplace set to rock music, and I must say I found most of the music somewhat characterless....It is nevertheless consistently tuneful and contains a few rock ballads that could prove memorable." Advertising for the Broadway production broke new ground with the first TV commercial that actually showed scenes from a Broadway show. The 60-second commercial showed Ben Vereen and two chorus dancers, Candy Brown and Pamela Sousa, in the instrumental dance sequence from "Glory". The commercial ended with the tagline, "You can see the other 119 minutes of Pippin live at the Imperial Theatre, without commercial interruption."

Musical theatre scholar Scott Miller said in his 1996 book, From Assassins to West Side Story, "Pippin is a largely under-appreciated musical with a great deal more substance to it than many people realize....Because of its 1970s pop style score and a somewhat emasculated licensed version for amateur productions, which is very different from the original Broadway production, the show now has a reputation for being merely cute and harmlessly naughty; but if done the way director Bob Fosse envisioned it, the show is surreal and disturbing." Fosse introduced "quasi-Brechtian elements" to empower audiences. Brecht's 'distancing effect' breaks the illusion of reality to encourage analysis of the play's meaning. The ambiguity of Pippin's "trapped, but happy" line forces spectators to confront the frustrations of ordinary life as well as the fruitlessness of Pippin's attempt at revolution. Distancing empowers the spectator to think, and moreover to decide for themselves.

=== Original West End production ===
The show opened in the West End at Her Majesty's Theatre on October 30, 1973, and ran for 85 performances. Louise Quick, Fosse's personal assistant, and Gene Foote, an original cast member, co-directed this production with Fosse's original staging and choreography. The cast included Northern Calloway as the Leading Player, Paul Jones as Pippin, John Turner as Charlemagne, Diane Langton as Fastrada, Elisabeth Welch as Berthe, and Patricia Hodge as Catherine.

=== National tours ===
The first US tour opened on September 20, 1974, at the Scranton Cultural Center. The production starred Irving Lee as the Leading Player, Barry Williams as Pippin, I. M. Hobson as Charlemagne, Louisa Flanigan as Fastrada, Adam Grammis as Lewis, Dortha Duckworth as Berthe, Carol Fox Prescott as Catherine, and Eric Brown as Theo. The production closed at The Playhouse on Rodney Square in Wilmington, Delaware, on April 5, 1975.

A second tour starring Michael Rupert as Pippin, Larry Riley as the Leading Player, Eric Berry as Charles (reprising his role from the original Broadway cast), and Thelma Carpenter as Berthe opened at the Los Angeles Civic Light Opera on August 2, 1977. The tour closed at the Dorothy Chandler Pavilion back in Los Angeles on August 26, 1978.

A third tour began opened on October 7, 2006, at the Eisenhower Hall Theatre in West Point, New York. The cast was led by Andre Ward as the Leading Player, Joshua Park as Pippin, Micky Dolenz as Charlemagne, Shannon Lewis as Fastrada, James Royce Edwards as Lewis, Teal Wicks as Catherine, and Jason Blaines as Theo. The production ended its run on January 15, 2007, at the Forrest Theatre in Philadelphia, Pennsylvania.

The fourth US tour (the 2013 Broadway revival version) launched in September 2014, at the Buell Theatre in Denver, Colorado, with Sasha Allen as Leading Player, Kyle Selig as Pippin, John Rubinstein as Charles, Sabrina Harper as Fastrada, Kristine Reese as Catherine, and Lucie Arnaz as Berthe. Selig was placed on vocal rest just one week before the tour was scheduled to open and was replaced by Matthew James Thomas. Despite being said to be on a medical leave of absence, Selig never rejoined the touring company; but instead, when Thomas left the production, he was replaced by Kyle Dean Massey. Andrea Martin reprised her role as Berthe for the last two weeks of the San Francisco engagement and the entire Los Angeles engagement of the tour. In Dallas in summer of 2015 the role of Berthe was played by Adrienne Barbeau and Pippin by Sam Lips. Gabrielle McClinton (who performed the role on Broadway as Tony Award Winner Patina Miller's understudy) replaced Sasha Allen as Leading Player on July 29, 2015, in Chicago, and Brian Flores replaced Sam Lips as Pippin.

=== Broadway revival ===
A new production was developed for the American Repertory Theater in Cambridge, Massachusetts. The production was directed by Diane Paulus, with choreography by Chet Walker, scenic design by Scott Pask, costume design by Dominique Lemieux, lighting design by Kenneth Posner, sound design by Clive Goodwin, orchestrations by Larry Hochman, music supervision by Nadia DiGiallonardo, and music direction by Charlie Alterman. This production integrates illusions by Paul Kieve and circus acts created by Gypsy Snider and performed by the Montreal-based troupe The 7 Fingers. The cast was led by Matthew James Thomas as the title prince, Patina Miller as Leading Player, Andrea Martin as Berthe, Rachel Bay Jones as Catherine, Erik Altemus as Lewis, Terrence Mann as King Charles, Charlotte d'Amboise as Fastrada and Andrew Cekala as Theo. The players were Gregory Arsenal, Lolita Costet, Colin Cunliffe, Andrew Fitch, Orion Griffiths, Viktoria Grimmy, Olga Karmansky, Bethany Moore, Stephanie Pope, Philip Rosenberg, Yannick Thomas, Molly Tynes, and Anthony Wayne. Miller was nervous to take on the role of the Leading Player, re-creating a character originated by the highly acclaimed Vereen. However, the challenge presented by such a role, and the representational power of the gender-blind casting, outweighed the apprehension. "I know there are people who wonder why the Leading Player has to be a woman this time, but one of the great things about revivals is to be able to do things in a new and exciting way", Miller said. Composer Stephen Schwartz was present to oversee the sitzprobe. The production omits the first act number "Welcome Home". The A.R.T. production opened on December 5, 2012, and ran through January 20, 2013.

The production transferred to Broadway beginning with previews on March 23, 2013, at the Music Box Theatre, followed by an opening on April 25. The same cast that performed at the A.R.T. transferred to the Broadway production. Diane Paulus again directed, with circus choreography and acrobatics by Chet Walker and Gypsy Snider. This revival won four categories at the 67th Tony Awards out of 10 nominations, including Best Revival, Best Leading Actress for Miller, Best Featured Actress for Martin, and Best Direction for Paulus. On April 1, 2014, the roles of Pippin and Leading Player were taken over by Kyle Dean Massey and Ciara Renée, respectively. The role of Berthe was taken over by Tovah Feldshuh, Annie Potts, and then Priscilla Lopez. On June 19, 2014 John Rubinstein, the original Pippin in 1972, replaced Terrence Mann in the role of Charles. From September 2, 2014, through September 21, 2014, the role of Berthe was played again by Andrea Martin, who won the Tony for her portrayal of Berthe in 2013. In September 2014, Carly Hughes replaced Ciara Renee as the Leading Player. In November, Josh Kaufman, winner of the sixth season of U.S. television series The Voice, took over the role of Pippin from Kyle Dean Massey.

The Broadway revival closed on January 4, 2015.

=== Other productions ===
The original Australian production (a replica of the Broadway production) opened in February 1974 at Her Majesty's Theatre in Melbourne. It starred John Farnham as Pippin, with Ronne Arnold as the Leading Player, Colleen Hewett as Catherine, Nancye Hayes as Fastrada, David Ravenswood as Charles and Jenny Howard as Berthe. The production transferred to Her Majesty's Theatre in Sydney in August 1974. A cast album was released and it reached 60th on the Australian charts according to the Kent Music Report.

Following an 8-month suspension of theatrical performances due to the global coronavirus pandemic, Pippin was the first major musical to open in Australia, produced by the Gordon Frost Organisation at the Lyric Theatre in Sydney. Previews began 24 November with an official opening on 3 December 2020, and a planned closing on January 31, 2021. The production reproduces the 2014 Broadway revival and is directed by Diane Paulus. It stars Ainsley Melham as the title character and Gabrielle McClinton, reprising her Broadway role as Leading Player. The cast also includes: Simon Burke as Charlemagne, Lucy Maunder as Catherine, Leslie Bell as Fastrada, Euan Doidge as Lewis and Kerri-Anne Kennerley as Berthe. Theo is alternated between Ryan Yates, George Halahan-Cantwell, Andrew Alexander and William Wheeler. The production was criticized for failing to cast a local woman of colour as the Leading Player.

In 1974, Pippin made its Spanish-language debut at Teatro de los Insurgentes in Mexico City. It was produced by Mexican pop singer Julissa, who also played Catherine. Also in the cast were Burt Rodríguez as Leading Player, Héctor Ortiz as Pippin, Guillermo Rivas as Charles, Anita Blanch as Berthe, and Jacqueline Voltaire as Fastrada. A cast album was released by Discos Gas.

On June 10, 1975, the musical made its African debut at His Majesty's Theatre in Johannesburg, South Africa. It was produced by musical duo Des and Dawn Lindberg and starred Sammy Brown as Leading Player, Hal Watters as Pippin, Robin Dolton as Charles, Andre Haddingh as Catherine, Jo-Ann Pezarro as Fastrada, and Bess Finney as Berthe. A cast recording was released by Satbel later in 1975.

In 1986, a production of Pippin toured throughout the US, directed by Ben Vereen. Vereen also reprised his original role of the Leading Player. The production was choreographed by Kathryn Doby, who was also in the original production. The cast featured: Sam Scalamoni (Pippin), Betty Ann Grove (Berthe), Ginger Prince (Fastrada), Rae Norman (Catherine), and Ed Dixon (Charles).

In June 2000, the Paper Mill Playhouse in Milburn, New Jersey, staged a revival with director Robert Johanson, choreography by Rob Ashford, set design by Michael Anania, costume design by Gene Meyer and Gregg Barnes, lighting design by Kirk Bookman, and orchestrations by David Siegel. The cast starred Jim Newman (Lead Player), Ed Dixon (Charlemagne), Jack Noseworthy (Pippin), Natascia Diaz (Catherine), Sara Gettelfinger (Fastrada), Davis Kirby (Lewis), and Charlotte Rae (Berthe).

In 2004, the first major New York revisitation of the show was featured as the second annual World AIDS Day Concert presented by Jamie McGonnigal. It featured Michael Arden as Pippin, Laura Benanti as Catherine, Julia Murney as Fastrada, Terrence Mann as Charlemagne, Charles Busch as Berthe, and the role of the Leading Player was split up among five actors including Rosie O'Donnell, Darius de Haas, Billy Porter, Kate Shindle and a surprise guest appearance by Ben Vereen, making his first New York stage appearance in over a decade.

In 2005, the Bay Street Theatre in Sag Harbor, New York, staged a production starring BD Wong (Leading Player), Stephanie Pope (Fastrada), Anastasia Barzee (Catherine) and James Stanek (Pippin). The production ran from August 9, 2005, through September 4, 2005.

East West Players (EWP) produced a diverse and inclusive version of the musical featuring a cast with all artists of color as a part of their 42nd season under the artistic direction of Tim Dang. At the time, Pippin was the highest grossing production ever produced by EWP in their 50-year history (later surpassed by Allegiance in 2018). Stephen Schwartz had reached out to Tim Dang on multiple occasions prior to the show's run, playfully noting that EWP had a penchant for hosting the works of Stephen Sondheim while "never [doing Schwartz's] work -- the other SS." From this interaction, a new version of the musical was conceived.

As with other interpretations of this musical, the music and aesthetics of EWP's iteration were a vast departure from the original. Both aspects of the production were heavily inspired by the animated works of Shinichirō Watanabe, who is most well known for his work on the Japanese anime series Cowboy Bebop and Samurai Champloo; as such, the production incorporated aesthetic aspects of both anime and hip-hop. The set, designed by Alan Muraoka, was constructed in the image of a dance club with characters sporting vibrantly colored costumes and slicked neon hairstyles. Dang saw this blend of cultural elements as a reflection of the youth at the time:

A lot of the younger audiences, the younger performers, don't want to be defined by race anymore. They're not necessarily Asian anymore, or African American or Latino. They're this urban, metropolitan, cosmopolitan kind of generation.

The show was produced in Los Angeles at the Mark Taper Forum, from January 15, 2009, through March 15, 2009, in a radically different form. The play's setting was changed to reflect a modern tone and was subtly modified to include deaf actors using American Sign Language. The production was choreographed and directed by Jeff Calhoun for actors from both the Deaf West Theatre Company and the Center Theatre Group. The title character was played by Tyrone Giordano and was voiced by actor Michael Arden. The Leading Player was played by Ty Taylor. The rest of the cast included Troy Kotsur as Charles (who was voiced by Dan Callaway), Sara Gettelfinger as Fastrada, Harriet Harris as Berthe, and Melissa van der Schyff as Catherine. Nicolas Conway and José F. Lopez Jr. alternated as the role of Theo (and they were voiced by Bryan Terrell Clark). The New York Times noted that the duality was required by the situation, but effectively showcased the character's "lack of a fixed self" in an exciting new fashion.

The Menier Chocolate Factory opened a revival of Pippin on November 22, 2011. The cast was made up of Frances Ruffelle, Ian Kelsey, Matt Rawle, Carly Bawden, Ben Bunce, Louise Gold, Bob Harms, Harry Hepple, Holly James, Anabel Kutay, David McMullan, Stuart Neal, David Page, and Kate Tydman. The creative team was led by director/choreographer Mitch Sebastian.

The Kansas City Repertory Theatre produced and performed a version of Pippin that opened on September 14, 2012, and closed on October 7, 2012. The score was adapted to reflect a punk-rock style by Curtis Moore. The cast included Wallace Smith as the Leading Player, Claybourne Elder as Pippin, John Hickok as Charles, Katie Kalahurka as Fastrada/Ensemble, Sam Cordes as Lewis, Mary Testa as Berthe, Katie Gilchrist as Catherine/Ensemble, and Utah Boggs as Theo. The ensemble was made up of Jennie Greenberry and Gil Perez-Abraham Jr.

The creative team was headed by Director Eric Rosen, Production Stage Manager Samantha Greene, Music Director/Orchestrator/Arranger Curtis Moore, Choreography Chase Brock, Scenic Design Jack Magaw, Costumes Alison Heryer, Lighting Design Jason Lyons, and Sound Design Zachary Williamson.

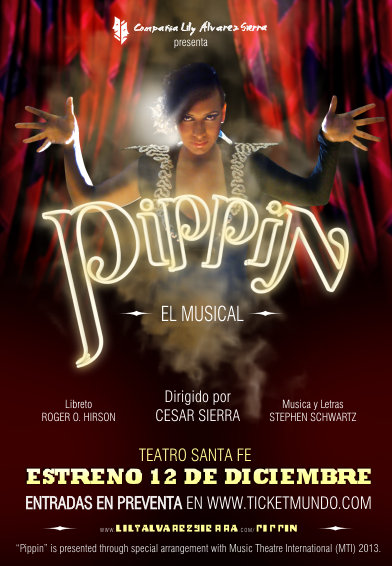
Pippin, Venezuela, 2013

A Spanish-language version of Pippin, produced by the Lily Alvarez Sierra Company in Caracas, Venezuela, directed by César Sierra, opened on December 12, 2013. The cast featured Ruthsy Fuentes as the Leading Player, Wilfredo Parra as Pippin, Anthony LoRusso as Charlemagne, Marielena González as Fastrada, Orlando Alfonzo and Gerardo Lugo shared the role of Lewis, Violeta Alemán as Berthe, and Rebeca Herrera Martinez as Catherine.

In August 2017, a scaled down production opened at the Hope Mill Theatre in Manchester. It featured a ten-person cast and a scaled down set to focus more on the story. This production transferred in late February 2018 to the Southwark Playhouse in London for a limited run. The production starred Jonathan Carlton as Pippin and Genevieve Nicole as Leading Player.

A Japanese-language version of Pippin, produced by Fuji-Television, Kyodo-Tokyo and Watanabe-Entertainment in Tokyo, directed by Diane Paulus, opened on June 10, 2019. It then commenced a tour in July in Nagaoya, Osaka and Shizuoka. The cast featured Yu Shirota as Pippin, Crystal Kay as the Leading Player, Kiyotaka Imai as Charlemagne, Hiromu Kiriya as Fastrada, Ryosuke Okada as Lewis, Mie Nakao and Beverly Maeda shared the role of Berthe, Emma Miyazawa as Catherine, and Jian Kawai & Seishiro Higurashi shared the role of Theo.

== Film adaptations and recordings ==
=== Cast recordings ===
In 1972, a cast recording of the original Broadway production was released on LP by Motown Records. It was the label's first musical cast recording and featured the entire original cast. In 2000, it was remastered and released on CD by Decca Broadway. This version featured the Supremes' cover of "I Guess I'll Miss the Man", the Jackson 5's cover of "Corner of the Sky", and Michael Jackson's cover of "Morning Glow" as bonus tracks.

A cast recording was made for the Australian premiere, starring John Farnham and Colleen Hewett in 1973. It was released on LP and later CD by EMI.

The first non-English cast album was made for the 1974 Mexico City production produced by and starring Julissa. Also featured were Hector Ortiz as Pippin, Burt Rodríguez as Leading Player, Guillermo Rivas as Charles, Jacqueline Voltaire as Fastrada, and Anita Blanch as Berthe. The recording was released by Discos Gas on LP in 1974.

A 2013 revival cast recording was released on CD by Ghostlight Records on April 29, 2013. This version included four karaoke tracks as bonus tracks. A competition was held to find 700 fans of the show to sing the section of "No Time at All" where Berthe invites the audience to sing along with her.

Additional cast albums were released for the 1975 Johannesburg production and the 2014 Poznań production. Los Angeles Harbor College also recorded and released a cast album of their production in 1980.

=== 1981 filmed production ===
In 1981, a stage production of Pippin was videotaped for Canadian television network CTV. Kathryn Doby, Bob Fosse's dance captain for the original Broadway production, directed the production itself, and David Sheehan directed the video. Ben Vereen and Christopher Chadman returned as the Leading Player and Lewis, respectively, for the first time since the original Broadway production, while William Katt starred as Pippin. However, this version was a truncated adaptation, and several musical numbers were cut short. Additionally, "I Guess I'll Miss the Man" was omitted entirely from the production.

The cast included:

- Ben Vereen as the Leading Player
- William Katt as Pippin
- Leslie Denniston as Catherine
- Benjamin Rayson as Charlemagne
- Martha Raye as Berthe
- Chita Rivera as Fastrada
- Christopher Chadman as Lewis

=== Proposed feature film ===
In 2003, Miramax acquired the feature film rights for Pippin, following the success of the film adaptation of the musical Chicago.

It was announced in April 2013 that The Weinstein Company has set director/screenwriter James Ponsoldt to pen and adapt the film. In December 2014, Craig Zadan announced that his next project with coproducer Neil Meron would be Pippin, to be produced for The Weinstein Company. In April 2018, the film rights reverted to Schwartz following The Weinstein Company's bankruptcy filing with the project being shopped to other studios.

== Awards and nominations ==
=== Original Broadway production ===
Year	Award	Category	Nominee	Result
1973	Tony Award	Best Musical		Nominated
1973	Tony Award	Best Book of a Musical	Roger O. Hirson	Nominated
1973	Tony Award	Best Performance by a Leading Actor in a Musical	Ben Vereen	Won
1973	Tony Award	Best Performance by a Leading Actress in a Musical	Leland Palmer	Nominated
1973	Tony Award	Best Performance by a Featured Actress in a Musical	Irene Ryan	Nominated
1973	Tony Award	Best Original Score	Stephen Schwartz	Nominated
1973	Tony Award	Best Direction of a Musical	Bob Fosse	Won
1973	Tony Award	Best Choreography	Bob Fosse	Won
1973	Tony Award	Best Scenic Design	Tony Walton	Won
1973	Tony Award	Best Costume Design	Patricia Zipprodt	Nominated
1973	Tony Award	Best Lighting Design	Jules Fisher	Won
1973	Drama Desk Award	Outstanding Director	Bob Fosse	Won
1973	Drama Desk Award	Outstanding Choreography	Bob Fosse	Won
1973	Drama Desk Award	Outstanding Set Design	Tony Walton	Won
1973	Drama Desk Award	Outstanding Costume Design	Patricia Zipprodt	Won
1973	New York Drama Critics' Circle Award	Best Musical	Stephen Schwartz, Bob Fosse and Roger O. Hirson	Runner-up

=== 2013 Broadway revival ===
Year	Award	Category	Nominee	Result
2013	Tony Award	Best Revival of a Musical		Won
2013	Tony Award	Best Actress in a Musical	Patina Miller	Won
2013	Tony Award	Best Featured Actor in a Musical	Terrence Mann	Nominated
2013	Tony Award	Best Featured Actress in a Musical	Andrea Martin	Won
2013	Tony Award	Best Direction of a Musical	Diane Paulus	Won
2013	Tony Award	Best Choreography	Chet Walker	Nominated
2013	Tony Award	Best Scenic Design of a Musical	Scott Pask	Nominated
2013	Tony Award	Best Costume Design of a Musical	Dominique Lemieux	Nominated
2013	Tony Award	Best Lighting Design of a Musical	Kenneth Posner	Nominated
2013	Tony Award	Best Sound Design of a Musical	Jonathan Deans and Garth Helm	Nominated
2013	Drama League Awards	Outstanding Revival of a Broadway or Off-Broadway Musical		Won
2013	Drama League Awards	Distinguished Performance Award	Andrea Martin	Nominated
2013	Drama League Awards	Distinguished Performance Award	Patina Miller	Nominated
2013	Drama Desk Award	Outstanding Revival of a Musical		Won
2013	Drama Desk Award	Outstanding Director of a Musical	Diane Paulus	Won
2013	Drama Desk Award	Outstanding Featured Actress in a Musical	Andrea Martin	Won
2013	Drama Desk Award	Outstanding Choreography	Chet Walker and Gypsy Snider	Won
2013	Drama Desk Award	Outstanding Costume Design	Dominique Lemieux	Nominated
2013	Drama Desk Award	Outstanding Lighting Design	Kenneth Posner	Nominated
2013	Outer Critics Circle Awards	Outstanding Revival of a Musical		Won
2013	Outer Critics Circle Awards	Outstanding Actor in a Musical	Matthew James Thomas	Nominated
2013	Outer Critics Circle Awards	Outstanding Actress in a Musical	Patina Miller	Won
2013	Outer Critics Circle Awards	Outstanding Featured Actor in a Musical	Terrence Mann	Won
2013	Outer Critics Circle Awards	Outstanding Featured Actress in a Musical	Andrea Martin	Won
2013	Outer Critics Circle Awards	Outstanding Featured Actress in a Musical	Charlotte d'Amboise	Nominated
2013	Outer Critics Circle Awards	Outstanding Director of a Musical	Diane Paulus	Won
2013	Outer Critics Circle Awards	Outstanding Choreographer	Chet Walker	Won
2013	Outer Critics Circle Awards	Outstanding Set Design	Scott Pask	Nominated
2013	Outer Critics Circle Awards	Outstanding Costume Design	Dominique Lemieux	Nominated
2013	Outer Critics Circle Awards	Outstanding Lighting Design	Kenneth Posner	Won
2013	Fred & Adele Astaire Awards	Outstanding Female Dancer in a Broadway Show	Charlotte d'Amboise	Won
2013	Fred & Adele Astaire Awards	Outstanding Female Dancer in a Broadway Show	Patina Miller	Nominated
2013	Fred & Adele Astaire Awards	Outstanding Female Dancer in a Broadway Show	Andrea Martin	Nominated
2013	Fred & Adele Astaire Awards	Outstanding Female Dancer in a Broadway Show	Stephanie Pope	Nominated
2013	Fred & Adele Astaire Awards	Outstanding Choreographer of a Broadway Show	Chet Walker	Won
