= Gypsy Snider =

Canadian choreographer

- Born: 1970 (age 55–56) (Note: In 2014, Snider was reported to be 44); San Francisco, US
- Occupations: acrobat and choreographer
- Known for: The 7 Fingers and Pippin

Gypsy Snider (born 1970) is a Canadian–American director, choreographer, and former acrobat. She co-founded The 7 Fingers, an artist collective, and choreographed Pippin in 2013.

== Early life and education ==
Snider's mother Peggy and stepfather Larry Pisoni co-founded the Pickle Family Circus, which her brother Lorenzo Pisoni also performed in as a clown and actor. She made her Pickle Family Circus debut at the age of four as a circus performer. Snider attended The Urban School of San Francisco with fellow acrobats Ayin and Miriam de Sela and later the Scuola Teatro Dimitri physical-theater school in Switzerland.

== Career ==
In 2002, Snider co-founded The 7 Fingers, an artist collective, with Shana Carroll, who apprenticed with her family's circus. Together with their husbands and three colleagues, The 7 Fingers first performed at the Just for Laughs Festival in Montreal. She also co-directed and choreographed "Traces" with The 7 Fingers which earned an Outstanding Choreography, New York Drama Desk Award nomination. The title was derived from the idea that every person leaves behind a legacy or "traces" in their wake. The show was described by critics as "unpretentious entertainment by performers who get a kick out of showing off their mad skills."

In 2008, Snider divorced her husband Patrick Léonard and was diagnosed with colon cancer. Once her cancer was in remission, she worked with Diane Paulus and Chet Walker to choreograph a revitalized Pippin on Broadway. She also created, directed and choreographed Réversible with The 7 Fingers, which was described as “a riveting mix of theatre, circus, dance, music and acrobatics, dedicated to a generation who forged the world that we live in today.”

== Credits ==
=== Directing credits ===
- Ships in the Night (Virgin Voyages, 2020)
- Sisters (The 7 Fingers, 2018)
- Under the Stars, Bench 2017
- Reversible (The 7 Fingers, 2016)
- Traces (The 7 Fingers, 2006)
- Typo (Cirque Eloize 2005)
- Loft (The 7 Fingers, 2002)
- Circumstance (Pickle Family Circus, 2002)

=== Acrobatic design and choreography ===
- UEFA Euro 2020 draw ceremony (Romania, 2019)
- Pippin, The Musical (Broadway, 2013)
- Peter Pan 360 (ThreeSixty Entertainment, 2015)
