= Great Antonio =

Croatian-Canadian strongman, photomontage artist and wrestler

Antonio Barichievich
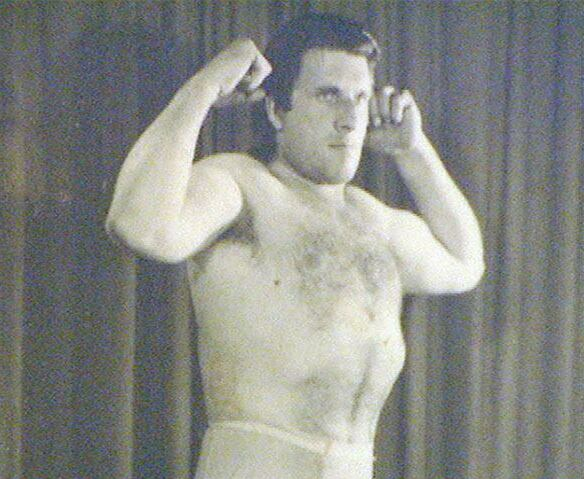
- Antonio at 21 years old (c. 1946)
- Born: Anton Baričević; October 10, 1925; Zagreb, Kingdom of Serbs, Croats and Slovenes
- Died: September 7, 2003 (aged 77); Montreal, Quebec, Canada
- Occupations: Strongman, professional wrestler
- Years active: Late 1940s – 2003
- Height: 6 ft 4 in (193 cm)

Antonio Barichievich (October 10, 1925 – September 7, 2003), born Anton Barichevich and better known as The Great Antonio, was a Croatian-Canadian strongman, professional wrestler, and a Montreal eccentric artist. Barichievich was born in Zagreb, Kingdom of Serbs, Croats and Slovenes. Nothing is known about his early life and family aside that according to biographers, he started to do menial work by the age of six and could uproot trees by age 12. During World War II, he spent time at a concentration camp in the Independent State of Croatia. There is mention of Bagnoli displaced persons camp. He arrived as a refugee in Canada in 1945 and established himself in Montreal, Quebec. In the late 1940s, Barichievich made a name for himself with demonstrations of strength, and in 1952, he pulled a 433-tonne train 19.8 meters, a feat featured in the Guinness Book of World Records.

Moving forward, Barichievich would tour making demonstrations of strength and wrestled professionally. In 1960, he appeared for the second time in Guinness Book of World Records by pulling four city buses loaded with passengers. Barichievich wrestled until the late 1970s and demonstrated strength until the 1980s.

Until he died in 2003, Barichievich became a Montreal eccentric roaming the streets selling photomontage postcards of his past exploits. At the end of his life, his photomontages started to gain artistic recognition and are currently featured in museum exhibits.

== Early life ==
Barichievich was born Anton Baričević in Zagreb, Kingdom of Serbs, Croats and Slovenes. Biographers have written that he went to work with a pick and shovel at the age of six and was able to uproot trees with a cable around his neck by age 12. Antonio was at the Bagnoli displaced persons camp during World War II. In 1945, he arrived by refugee ship in Halifax, Nova Scotia, Canada. He never discussed his experiences during World War II, but writers speculate that he was psychologically affected by whatever he saw and experienced.

== Career ==
=== Strongman competitions ===
Beginning in the late 1940s, Barichievich began appearing as a strongman in Montreal. He first made it into the Guinness Book of World Records in 1952 by pulling a 433-tonne train 19.8 metres.

In 1960, he made it again into Guinness by pulling four city buses loaded with passengers. He weighed 465 pounds (211 kg) and stood about 6 foot 4 inches (1.93 m). His suits were size 90 and his shoes size 28. He could eat 25 chickens or 10 steaks at one sitting.

During the 1970s he toured the world as a strongman and performer, appearing in world capitals and on popular TV variety shows.

Despite his imposing stature, Barichievich is said to have sung with a soft, beautiful voice, and at one time wanted to tour with Tiny Tim. Throughout the 1970s and 1980s, he made increasingly eccentric demands: he said he would pull a Boeing 747 down the tarmac provided Boeing gave him a jet for his own personal use, and he approached Don King saying that he would do a fight film for one million dollars.

=== Professional wrestling ===
In addition to strongman exhibitions, he participated in professional wrestling matches. As a younger wrestler he performed under the names Narcissus or Sweet Narcissus but by the late 1950s he had developed the Great Antonio persona. Barichievich purportedly almost won the Stampede North American Heavyweight Championship in wrestling in Calgary in 1971, but fans nearly rioted at the idea that Antonio, wrestling as a heel at the time, could appear and beat their hometown favorite. He was managed by Deepak Singh. His wrestling career continued into New Japan Pro-Wrestling through the 1970s without much success. On December 8, 1977, he lost a notorious match against Antonio Inoki during which Barichievich inexplicably began no-selling Inoki's attacks and then stiffing Inoki; Inoki responded by shooting on Barichievich, knocking him down with palm strikes and kicks, and then stomping him into a bloody mess as he lay on the mat.

=== Film and television ===
Barichievich appeared in several movies, including Quest for Fire (1982), A 20th Century Chocolate Cake (1983), and Abominable Snowman (1996). In addition, he made appearances on several television shows, including The Ed Sullivan Show and Johnny Carson's The Tonight Show.

=== Later life ===
As Barichievich grew older, he became a noted eccentric figure in his adopted home town of Montreal. He changed the story of his background on at least two occasions. In one instance, he claimed that, rather than being of Croatian descent, he was Italian. In his later years, he claimed that he was an extraterrestrial. Destitute, he frequented doughnut shops in Rosemont as well as Berri–UQAM metro station, where he sold postcards of himself and brochures outlining his life story. He carried "every scrap of paper that had been written about him over the years, news clippings from all over the world, in garbage bags." According to Elliott Augustine of Erudit, Barichievich started making photomontage of his past exploits to turned them into postcards in 1972. He describes Barichievich's work as well crafted, humorous, and "works of art in their own rights".

Prior to his death in September 2003, Barichievich was working with Quartier Éphémère, to present his photomontage works in an exhibit about outsiders artists. the event took place between October and December of that year.

=== 2003 to present day: tributes and posthumous success ===
After his death, discovered among the clippings was a letter from the office of Bill Clinton, and old photos of Barichievich with people including Pierre Trudeau, Liza Minnelli, Lee Majors, Sophia Loren and Johnny Carson.

In 2008, the Quebecois group Mes Aïeux recorded a song in homage to Barichievich on their album La ligne orange, as well as a recording of a song sung by the strongman himself.

In 2014, Élise Gravel wrote and illustrated a children's book about Barichievich.

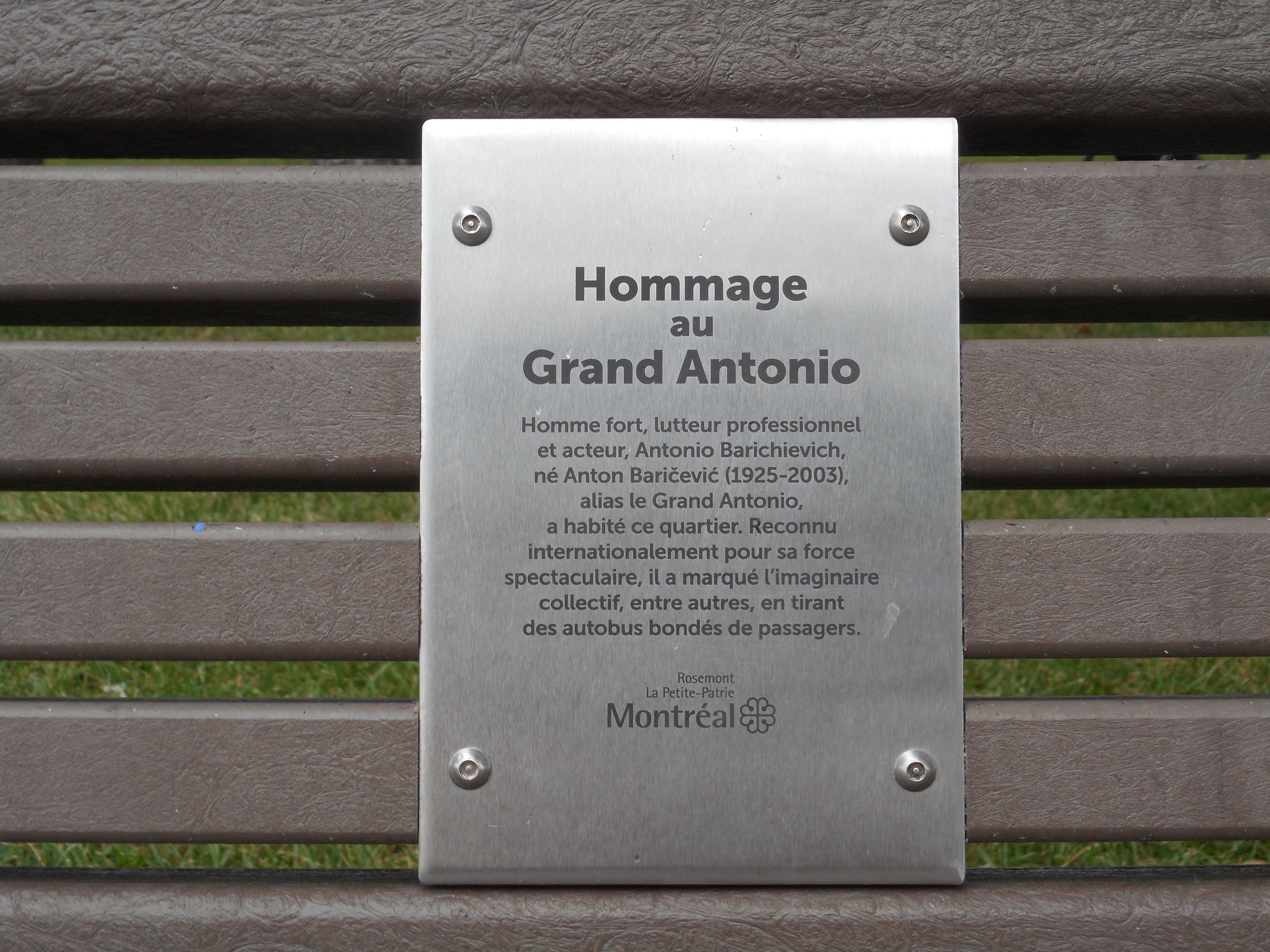
Plaque on bench, dedicated to The Great Antonio

In 2015, a plaque and bench were dedicated to him in the Rosemont–La Petite-Patrie borough of Montreal, where he had lived the last 20 years of his life in a small apartment.

Also that year, the American Folk Art Museum presented Barichievich's "first institutional presentation of his works."

In 2017, The Barr Brothers reference Barichievich in their track "Song That I Heard" from the album Queens of the Breakers.

Also that year, Barichievich personal papers went into the archives of McCord Stewart Museum.

== Death ==
Barichievich died in 2003 at the age of 77 of a heart attack while in a grocery store in Montreal.

== Personal life ==
He is believed to have been married at least twice, once in Europe and once in Canada, but he left behind no known descendants on either side.

== Accolades ==
- 1952 - Guinness World Records - by pulling a 433-tonne train 19.8 metres
- 1960 - Guinness World Records - by pulling four city buses loaded with passengers
- 1994 - The Mirror's Best Great Montrealer
