= Motel Capri =

Studio album by Les Cowboys Fringants
- Released: 2000
- Recorded: Studio 9e ciel
- Genre: Alternative rock(néo-trad)
- Length: 54:48
- Label: La Tribu
- Producer: Les Productions Louboy International

Les Cowboys Fringants chronology
Sur Mon Canapé (1998)	Motel Capri (2000)	Break syndical (2002)

Motel Capri is the third album by Québécois néo-trad band Les Cowboys Fringants.

== Track listing ==
1. Su' mon big Wheel (c'tait le fun) (Pauzé) – 0:11
2. Le plombier (Pauzé) – 3:03
3. Québécois de souche (Lebeau) – 2:04
4. Awikatchikaën (Tremblay, Pauzé) – 2:37
5. Maurice au bistro (Pauzé, Lépine) – 3:29
6. M'a vivre avec toi (Lebeau) – 5:10
7. Le Shack à Hector (Pauzé) – 4:41
8. Marcel Galarneau (Tremblay, Pauzé) – 2:38
9. Mon pays - Reel des Aristocrates (Pauzé, Lépine) – 4:14
10. Rue Chapdelaine (Pauzé) – 4:25
11. Banlieue (Pauzé) – 4:45
12. Voyou (Pauzé) – 2:53
13. Léopold - Le Temps Perdu (Lebeau - Prévert, Pauzé) – 4:12
14. Le Gars d'la Compagnie (Pauzé, Lépine) – 3:16
15. Le Pouceux (Pauzé, Dom) – 3:11
16. Un p'tit tour (Pauzé, Lebau) – 3:09

== Personnel ==
- Karl Tremblay – lead vocals, "3.00$ instrument"
- Dominique Lebeau – drums
- Marie-Annick Lépine – violin, accordion, violoncello, mandolin and female vocals
- J-F Pauzé – guitar, vocals
- Jérome Dupras – bass, backing vocals

== Production ==
In a humorous fashion, production credits are indicated in terms of 'Motel employees' title.

- Shareholders and Producers: Les Production Louboy International
- Reception and Phone: La Compagnie Larivée Cabot Champagne
- Motel Manager: Claude Larivé
- Room Service: La Tribu
- Handy-Man (part-time): Marc Talbot
- Room Decoration and musical arrangements: Les Cowboys Fringants with the touch of Louis-simon Hétu
- Photography: Anick Desjardins

=== Additional credits ===
- Sound take, mixing, creation: Louis-Simon Hétu (track 1, 2, 4 and 8 sound take Michel Tellier (Presqu'Ile studio) and track 1 mixed by Claude champagne (Studio champagne)
- Leaflet design: BBF Design
- engraving Jean-Francois Chicoine SNB

== Notable songs ==
=== Su'mon Big Wheel (C'tait l'fun) ===
One of their ultimate naïve art-esque songs. A silly 10 second piece with the title constituting the entire lyrics (On my Big Wheel, 'twas fun!). (A Big Wheel is a child's plastic tricycle toy). (listen)

=== Le Plombier ===
A thoroughly farcical song about a grotesque plumber sharing the name of ice hockey great Guy Lafleur, speaking fanatically about wrestling not being fake. The song grew out of a bet made to J-F Pauzé by singer Karl Tremblay to manage writing a song with bizarre, random expressions like Jaromir Jagr haircut, butt crack and Velveeta. And since that time, when I see the real Guy Lafleur on TV; I always have a little thought for a fat badly raised plumber! (listen)

=== Québécois de souche ===
A complete critical comical mocking of the anglicisms of the popular language of some Quebecers, and their corny lifestyles. I am an old-stock Québécois... My Bill 101, don't you dare touch it; It's not that I don't know how to speak well... but I'm an englished colon (in the sense of colonist)... (listen)

=== Mon Pays ===
Mon Pays, suivi du Reel des Aristocrates is a very amusing song which ends in a long reel and laying down the ludicrous theory that much of the Quebec independence-related defeats of the Quebec people throughout its history (the Battle of the Plains of Abraham, the Lower Canada Rebellion and the October Crisis) are caused by an almost endemic tradition of drunkenness. The Patriotes rebelled, the English regime will have to fall, they got out their ceintures fléchées! The Patriotes all agreed: to achieve victory, we will have to stop drinking! (listen live)

=== Le Gars d'la compagnie ===
It's about Trois-Rivières workers and the Quebec forest, as well as aboriginals, being exploited by American businessmen before the Quiet Revolution. This might be one of the few songs with little irony (although some lyrical passages are indeed ironic). And the guy from the company was laughing secretly; Who's the idiot that says that money doesn't grow on trees! (listen live)
