= Mes Aïeux =

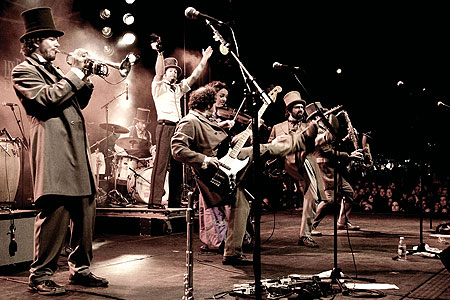

Background information
- Origin: Quebec, Canada
- Genres: Contemporary folk, Néo-trad
- Years active: 1996–present
- Website: mesaieux.qc.ca

Mes Aïeux (English: My Ancestors) is a neo-traditional Quebec folk music group founded in 1996.

== Style ==
Although a leader of the Quebec "neo-traditional" scene, the band takes a modern slant on that style, borrowing stories and characters from French Canadian folklore (the devil, the chasse-galerie, the shepherdess, the coureur des bois, drinking songs, etc.) to write about modern themes with a touch of humor. These themes include globalization (Qui nous mène?), politics (Ça va mal), criticism and mockery of the Quiet Revolution (Dégénérations/Le reel du fossé), over-medicating (Remède miracle), the frenetic pace of modern life (Train de vie/le surcheval, Continuer pareil), recent Québécois history (2096 (chanson à boire)), etc. Some of their songs involve personalities from Quebec history such as "La Corriveau" (La Corrida de la Corriveau), "The Great Antonio" (Antonio) and "Alexis le Trotteur" (Train de vie/le surcheval). The band also has written humorous songs about Québécois cultural phenomena, such as poutine (Hommage en grain).

== History ==
In November 2005, their album En famille went platinum (100,000 copies sold) and their two earlier albums, Ça parle au diable and Entre les branches both went gold (50,000 copies sold). In December 2006, En famille was certified double platinum (200,000 copies sold) and their album Tire-toi une bûche went gold after three weeks.

In 2005, Mes Aïeux was honoured with a Félix Award for the category of Best Contemporary Folk Album for En famille, in addition to being nominated for Group of the Year.

In 2007, Mes Aïeux won 3 Félix Awards for the Group of the year, Best Selling Album, and Song of the Year.

== Line-up ==
As of May 10, 2018.

=== Current members ===
- Marie-Hélène Fortin - violin, percussion, vocals (1996–present)
- Stéphane Archambault - vocals, melodica (1996–present)
- Frédéric Giroux - guitars, bass, harmonica, glockenspiel, vocals (1996–present)
- Marc-André Paquet - drums, percussions, bass, vocals (1996–present)
- Benoît Archambault - piano, trumpet, accordion, percussions, vocals (1996–present)
- Luc Lemire - saxophone, glockenspiel, percussions (1996–present)

=== Former members ===
- Éric Desranleau - vocals, guitars, bass, piano (1996–2011)

== Discography ==
Since their founding, the group has released six albums:

- Ça parle au diable (2000)
- Entre les branches (2001)
- En famille (2004)
- Tire-toi une bûche (Live) (2006)
- La ligne orange (2008)
- À l'aube du printemps (2012) #5 CAN
