= Christopher Chadman =

American dancer and choreographer

Christopher Chadman (August 31, 1948 – April 30, 1995) was an American dancer and choreographer who was nominated for Tony, Drama Desk, and Outer Critics Circle Awards and was the winner of the Fred Astaire Award for his choreography for the 1992 revival of Guys and Dolls.

Born in the Bronx, Chadman studied at the High School of Performing Arts and made his Broadway debut in 1968 in the ensemble of Darling of the Day, then went on to perform in Applause, The Rothschilds, Pippin, A Chorus Line, and Rockabye Hamlet. He was elevated to star billing when he played the title role in the 1976 revival of Pal Joey. Much of the role of "Greg" in A Chorus Line was based on his life experiences.

Chadman collaborated with Bob Fosse on Chicago, Dancin', and Big Deal. On his own he choreographed Merlin, a nightclub act for Chita Rivera, Peter Allen and The Rockettes at Radio City Music Hall, and a New York City Center concert version of Fiorello!, conceived and staged three concerts for Michael Feinstein, and created dance sequences for The Sisters Rosensweig.

Chadman's film credits include The Flamingo Kid, The Muppets Take Manhattan, and Scenes from a Mall.

Chadman died of complications from AIDS in New York City.
