= Karl Tremblay =

Canadian singer (1976–2023)

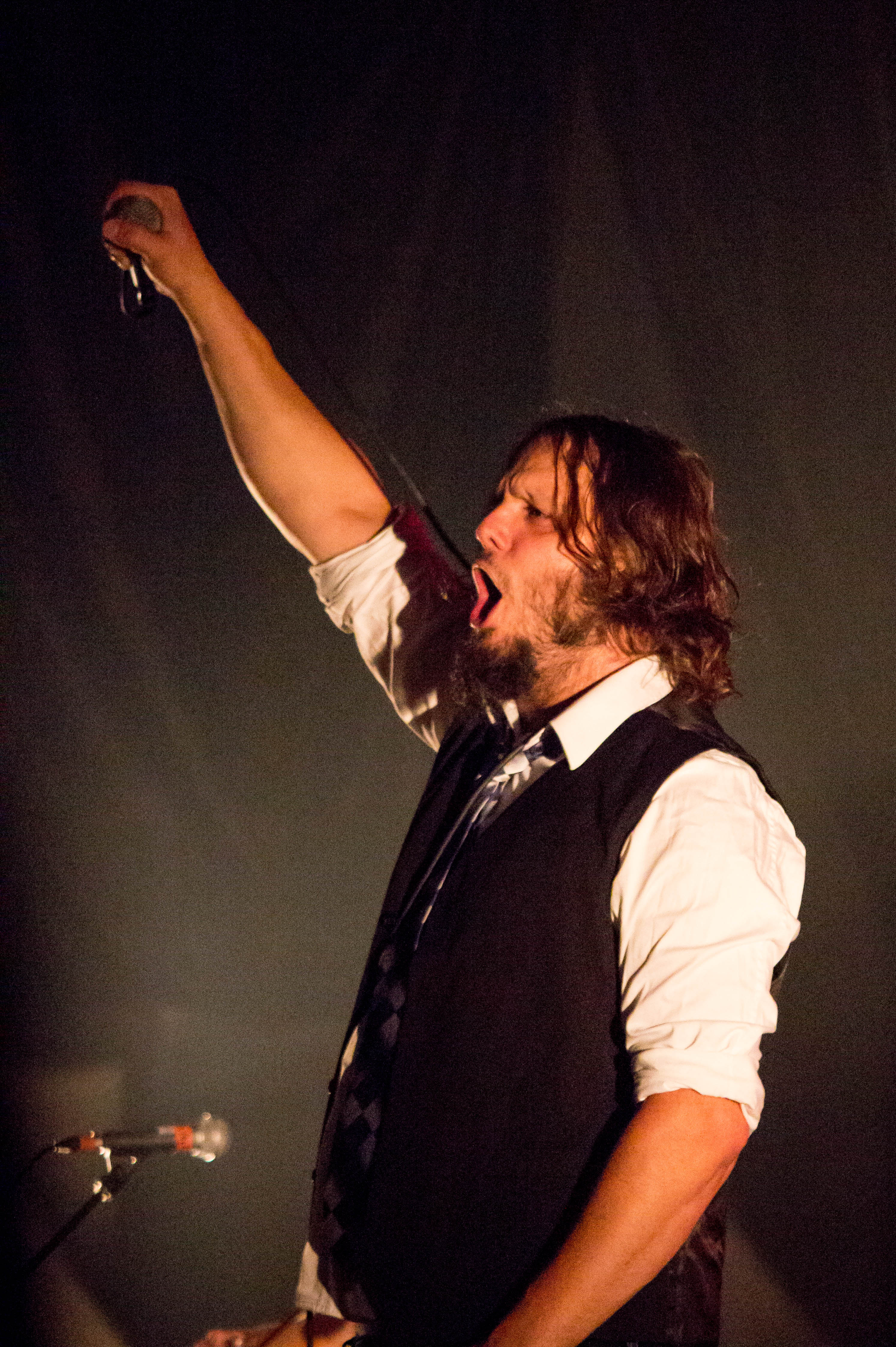
- Tremblay performing in 2013
- Born: 28 October 1976; Montreal, Quebec, Canada
- Died: 15 November 2023 (aged 47); Quebec, Canada
- Occupation: Singer
- Years active: 1994–2023
- Known for: Lead singer of Les Cowboys Fringants
- Notable work: Pub Royal, “La fin du show”
- Children: 2

Karl Tremblay (28 October 1976 – 15 November 2023) was a Canadian singer. He was the lead singer of Les Cowboys Fringants, a group he founded in 1994 with Jean-François Pauzé.

== Biography ==
Tremblay was born in Montreal on 28 October 1976. Tremblay and Pauzé founded a music group together and released their first song, "Les routes du bonheur". They then released their first album, titled 12 grandes chansons. Previously a full-time student, Tremblay abandoned his studies to devote himself to Les Cowboys Fringants, which became famous in Quebec in 1999. A true crowd leader, he gained favor with the Quebec public due to his lyricism and charisma. Les Cowboys Fringants sold more than 1,300,000 albums in the French-speaking world in total.

In addition to his career with the band, Tremblay appeared on the TV show M.Net, broadcast on MusiquePlus, in which he reviewed video games. In 2016, he participated in the launch of the company Triple Boris Inc., an independent studio for developing video games and mobile apps, for which he was creative director. With the band, he took part in many amateur festivals early in his career, such as Francouvertes.

== La fin du show ==
La fin du show (the end of the show) is a song by Les Cowboys Fringants, written by Jean-François Pauzé for the musical Pub Royal (2024). It is sung by Karl Tremblay. Although initially conceived as a pastiche of 1970s rock, the song developed into a more somber work depicting the final moments of an aging rock star, drawing parallels with Tremblay’s illness.

Because of his declining health, Tremblay recorded his vocals in a home studio. His performance, noted for its fragility, was assembled from several takes completed approximately one month before his death.

Following its release, the song received significant radio airplay despite its length (7:17), and was awarded song of the year at the Gala de l'ADISQ in November 2024. It is widely regarded as one of the most significant songs in the band’s repertoire.

== Personal life and death ==
Tremblay was married to Marie-Annick Lépine, one of the instrumentalists for Les Cowboys Fringants. On 19 July 2022, he announced that he had been suffering from prostate cancer since January 2020. Due to his illness, the group cancelled several shows to accommodate his treatment schedule, and his occasional appearances reflected the challenges he was facing.

He died from prostate cancer on 15 November 2023, at the age of 47. He was honoured with a Quebec national funeral at the Bell Centre in Montreal.
