= Population II (band) =

Canadian psychedelic rock band

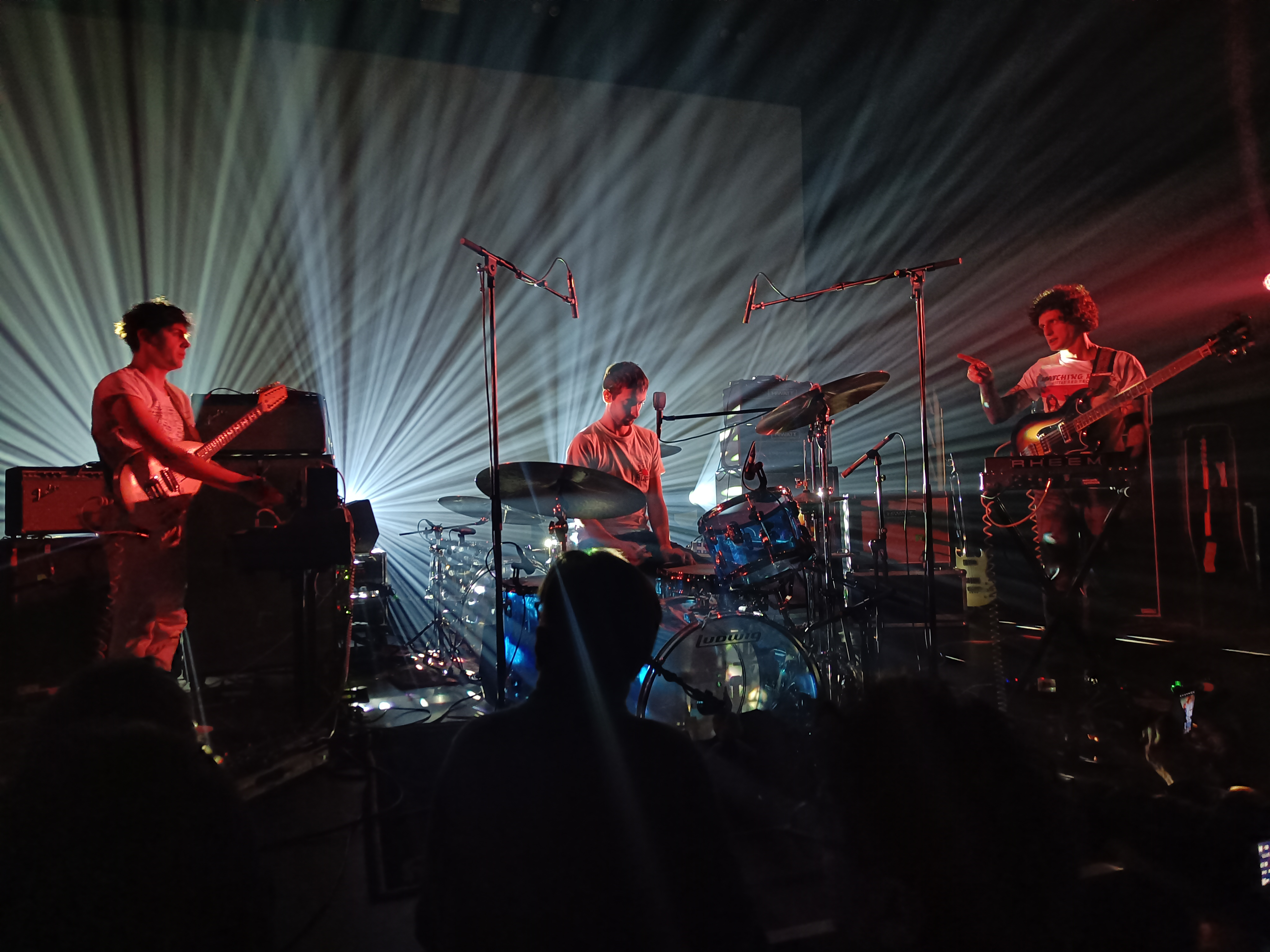
- Population II on stage in 2025

Background information
- Origin: Montreal, Quebec, Canada
- Genres: Psychedelic rock; Progressive rock
- Years active: 2015–present

Population II is a Canadian psychedelic rock band from Montreal, Quebec, whose 2023 album Électrons libre du Québec was a longlisted nominee for the 2024 Polaris Music Prize.

The band consists of singer and drummer Pierre-Luc Gratton, guitarist and keyboardist Tristan Lacombe, and bassist Sébastien Provençal. After releasing several two-song singles in the late 2010s, they released their full-length debut album À la Ô Terre on Castle Face Records in 2020.

Their 2025 album Maintenant Jamais was shortlisted for the 2025 Polaris Music Prize.
