= La Grand-Messe =

Studio album by Les Cowboys Fringants
- Released: 2004
- Recorded: Studio 270
- Genre: Néo-trad
- Label: La Tribu
- Producer: La Compagnie Larivée-Cabot-Champagne for Les Disque De La Tribu

Les Cowboys Fringants chronology
Attache ta tuque!	La Grand-Messe	Au Grand Théâtre de Québec

La Grand-Messe is the sixth studio album by the French Canadian néo-trad band Les Cowboys Fringants. It was released in 2004.

== Track listing ==
No.	Title	Length
1.	"Intro" (Lépine)	1:05
2.	"Les Étoiles Filantes" (Pauzé)	4:25
3.	"Ti-Cul" (Pauzé)	3:08
4.	"8 Secondes" (Pauzé)	4:05
5.	"Plus Rien" (Pauzé)	3:37
6.	"Hannah" (Pauzé, Lépine, Dupras)	5:24
7.	"Symphonie Pour Caza" (Pauzé)	5:36
8.	"La Reine" (Pauzé)	2:50
9.	"En Attendant/Le Reel De Nos Gens" (Pauzé, Lépine)	4:49
10.	"Lettre À Lévesque" (Pauzé)	3:46
11.	"Ces Temps-Ci" (Pauzé)	3:59
12.	"Ma Belle Sophie" (Lépine)	3:31
13.	"Shish Taouk" (Les Cowboys Fringants)	1:42
14.	"Camping Ste-Germaine" (Pauzé)	3:35
15.	"Si La Vie Vous Intéresse" (Pauzé, Lépine)	5:55
16.	"Épilogue: Si Tu Penses Un Peu Comme Ça" (Pauzé, Lebeau)	4:52
Total length:		67:19

== Booklet ==
=== Guest musician ===
- Ivanhoe Jolicoeur: trumpet, flügelhorn

=== Additional credits ===
- String arrangement: Marie-Annick Lépine
- Brass section arrangement: J-F Pauzé1, D. Jespersen, I. Jolicoeur
- Musical arrangement: Each band member does their own arrangements
- Realization: Les Cowboys Fringants and Robert Langlois
- Sound: Robert Langlois
- Mixing: Robert Langlois
- Mastering: Jim Rabchuck, Audiobec
- Cover concept: Colette Beaudin and Valérie Dupras
- Graphics: Jo-Anne Bolduc
- Guest star: Vincent Caza

=== Special notes ===
- Album composed at L'Assomption between January and August 2004
- Arranged between Saint-Charles-de-Mandeville and Montreal, 2004
- Recorded between June and October 2004, Studio 270, in Outremont
