= Les Cowboys Fringants =

Folk band from Quebec

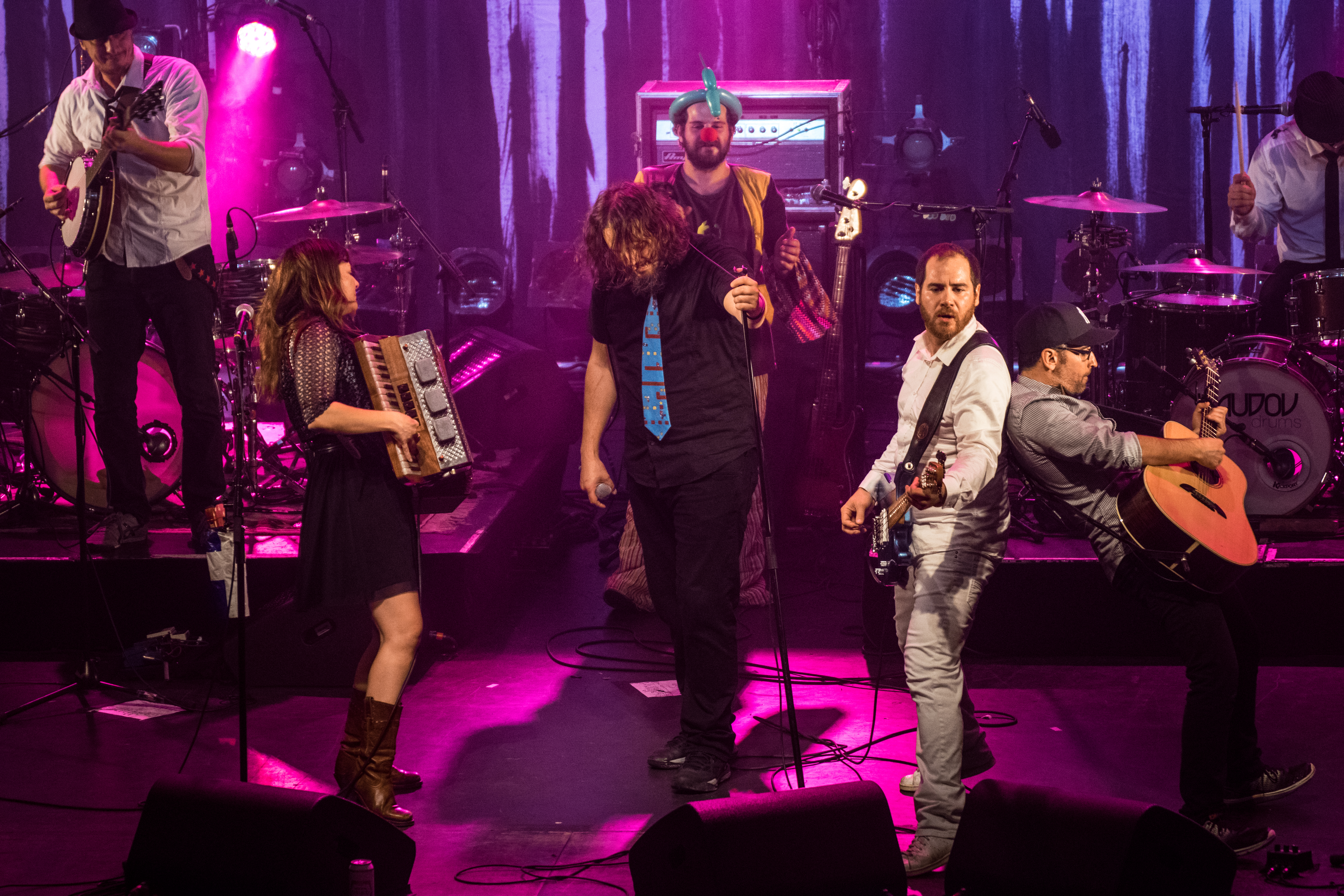
- The band in concert in 2016

Background information
- Origin: Repentigny, Quebec, Canada
- Genres: Néo-trad, alternative rock, folk punk, folk rock
- Years active: 1995–present
- Members: Jean-François Pauzé; Marie-Annick Lépine; Jérôme Dupras
- Past members: Dominique Lebeau; Karl Tremblay†
- Website: cowboysfringants.com

Les Cowboys Fringants (French pronunciation: [le kawbɔj fʁɛ̃ɡɑ̃]) are a Canadian folk rock band formed in 1995 in Repentigny, Quebec. The French word fringant can be translated as "dashing", or "frisky".

They perform Quebecker néo-trad music (modernized Quebec folk music with a rock flavour) and draw on country music. They have an international underground following, especially in France, French-speaking Belgium and Switzerland. Band members hail from the Montreal suburbs of Repentigny and L'Assomption. The entire band collaborates on the lyrics, although guitarist Jean-François Pauzé often contributes more than the others. The band are known for their live performances, captured on the Attache ta tuque! live album and the Centre Bell 30 décembre 2003 DVD.

The band has won 17 Félix Awards, including five at the 2020 edition of the ceremony. The group are five-time Juno Award nominees, winning one in 2024 for Francophone Album of the Year.

== Overview ==
Les Cowboys represent an important part of modern Québécois music. They are part of the néo-trad movement that appeared in Quebec around the turn of the 21st century, and they embody a resurgence of political songwriting. As the néo-trad movement adapts Quebec folklore into contemporary crafts, the political message of the band is a re-occurrence of 1970s chansonnier activist messages of left-wing solidarity and, recently, sovereignism. They also sometimes adopt a minimalist and dadaesque style, a trend of the Quebec music scene of the 2000s – a decade of voluntary simple yet nonetheless quite intelligent and joual lyrics, therefore subversive and akin to a sort of lyrical naïve art.

The group's songs cover environmentalism, and poverty, as well as the denouncing of consumerism, exploitation, state-controlled gambling, and political apathy. While some of those subjects are serious in appearance, they are often treated in a light manner, sometimes even in a fun or ironic way. The band also deals with themes of Quebec history, Quebec independence, suburban life, childhood and adolescence, kitsch, relationships and sports. Their songwriting is renowned for having woven an elaborate tapestry of fictional characters with interpersonal relationships, and sometimes a number of these characters appear in more than one song. Much like their writing, the clothes of the male members of the band are quite unique, sometimes purposely normal or kitsch and something of a postmodern, second degree artistic statement.

The band themselves are noted fans of Passe-Partout composer Pierre F. Brault and have performed shows in his honour. They have also been influenced by French singer Renaud, and his songs with political messages and local popular language.

The band went on tour in summer of 2011, visiting cities in Quebec, France and Switzerland.

In 2021, the band released a concert film, L'Amérique pleure, featuring songs performed in wild locations in Quebec, directed by Louis-Philippe Eno. It was released as an on-demand digital film.

In 2022, the group's lead singer, Karl Tremblay, announced that he had been diagnosed with prostate cancer. They paused most recording and touring activity as he pursued treatment, except for a performance at the Festival d'été de Québec in July 2023. Tremblay's death was announced on November 15, 2023.

Their 2023 album En concert avec l’Orchestre symphonique de Montréal (sous la direction du chef Simon Leclerc), recorded with the Montreal Symphony Orchestra, won the Juno Award for Francophone Album of the Year at the Juno Awards of 2024.

In 2024 they released Pub Royal, an album including the last songs Tremblay completed before his death. A jukebox musical of the same name, featuring the band's songs performed by musical theatre actors, also launched the same year. Also in 2024, the band, including Tremblay, were inducted into the Ordre des arts et des lettres du Québec.

In 2025, Pauzé released Les amours de seconde main, his debut solo album. The album debuted at #10 in the Canadian Albums Chart in October 2025, and received a Juno Award nomination for Francophone Album of the Year at the Juno Awards of 2026. The lead single "Ballon-sonde", written as a letter to the late Tremblay, reached the top of the Quebec music charts.

== Members ==
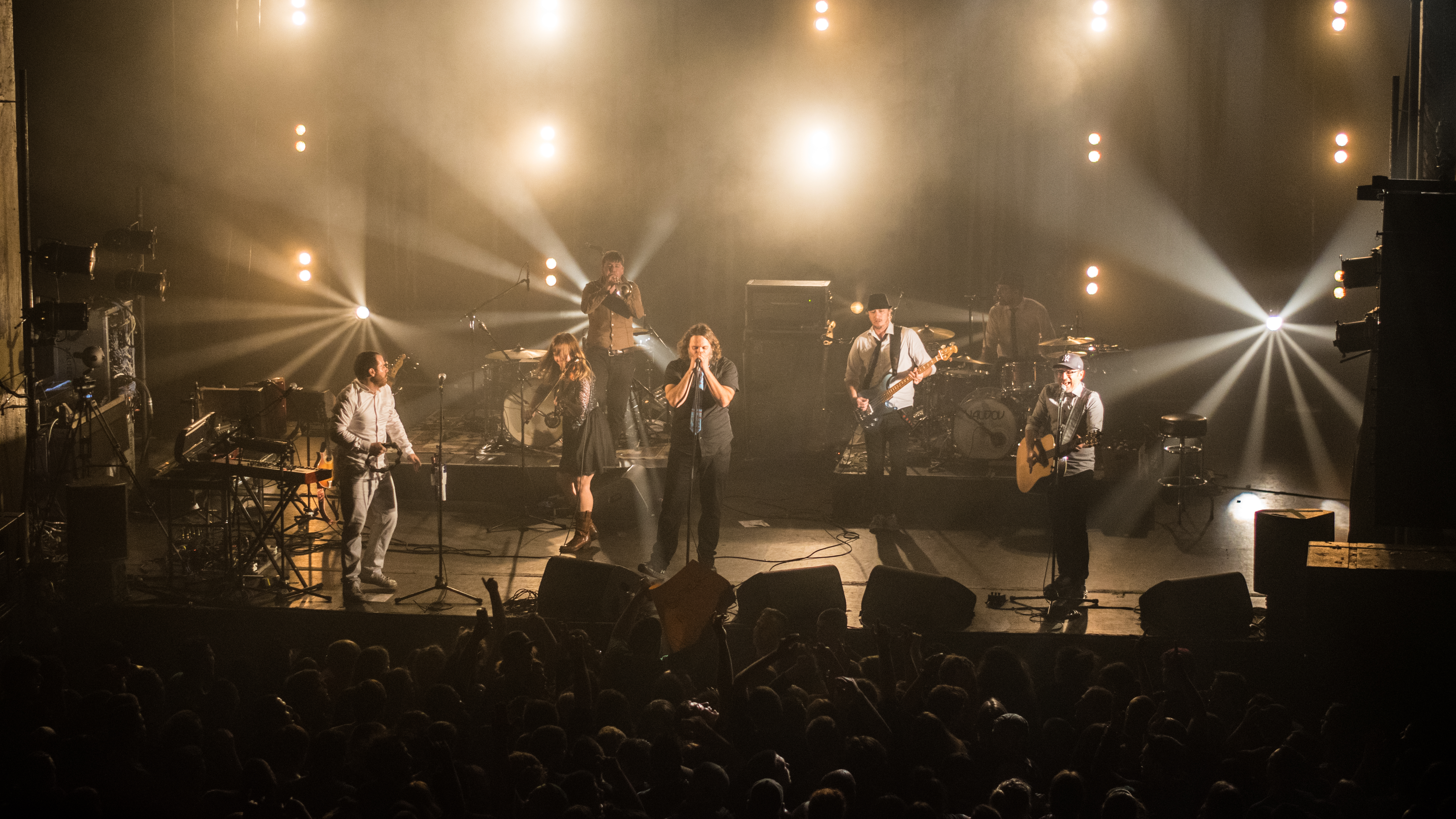
Les Cowboys Fringants at the Métropolis in Montreal, Quebec in 2016

Current members

- Jean-François "J-F" Pauzé – rhythm guitar
- Marie-Annick Lépine – violin, mandolin, accordion, piano, banjo
- Jérôme Dupras – bass guitar, double bass

Previous members

- Karl Tremblay – vocals; died on November 15, 2023
- Dominique "Domlebo" Lebeau – drums; left in 2007, citing personal reasons

== Discography ==
Studio albums

- 12 Grandes chansons (1997)
- Sur mon canapé (1998)
- Motel Capri (4 April 2000)
- Break syndical (5 March 2002)
- La Grand-Messe (23 November 2004)
- L'expédition (23 September 2008)
- Sur un air de déjà vu (14 October 2008)
- Que du vent (14 November 2011)
- Octobre (23 October 2015)
- Les antipodes (4 October 2019)
- Les nuits de Repentigny (12 March 2021)
- Pub Royal (25 April 2024)

Compilations

- Enfin Réunis (12 grandes chansons + Sur Mon Canapé) (20 November 2001)

Live albums

- Attache ta tuque! (13 May 2003)
- Au Grand Théâtre de Québec (2007)
- En concert au Zénith de Paris (2010)
- En concert avec l’Orchestre symphonique de Montréal (sous la direction du chef Simon Leclerc) - 2023

Recorded concerts

- Centre Bell 30 décembre 2003 – (13 April 2004)

== See also ==
- Néo-trad
- List of bands from Canada
- Music of Canada
- Music of Quebec
