= La Tribu =

Canadian independent record label

La Tribu is a Canadian independent record label founded in 1999 in Quebec.

== Noted artists ==
- Dorothée Berryman
- Robert Charlebois
- Les Cowboys Fringants
- Dee
- Dumas
- Louise Forestier
- Fred Fortin/Gros Mené
- Jorane
- Juste Robert (fr)
- Kate & Anna McGarrigle
- Jérôme Minière
- La Volée d'Castors
- WD-40

== See also ==
- Music of Quebec
- List of Quebec record labels
- List of record labels
