= Néo-trad =

Music genre

Néo-trad is a musical style from Quebec that arose around the turn of the 21st century. It can be considered a subgenre of Québécois folk music. The term combines the Greek prefix neo, meaning new, and the contraction of the word traditionnelle, as in traditional music.

== History ==
It basically constitutes modernized Quebec folklore music, usually mixed with rock and/or electronica. Some notable néo-trad artists are Mes Aïeux, and Les Cowboys Fringants. Okoumé can also be considered a néo-trad precursor.

The expression can also encompass all Trad groups, modern bands playing Québécois folklore (in a traditional way) like La Bottine Souriante, Les Charbonniers de l'enfer, La Volée d'Castors and Les Batinses. Inversely, the term Trad can encompass néo-trad groups.

== See also ==
- List of Quebec musicians
- Music of Quebec
- Culture of Quebec
- List of musical styles
- Folklore
