= Damn Yankees! (1967 film) =

- Genre: Comedy; Musical; Sport
- Written by: George Abbott; Douglass Wallop
- Directed by: Kirk Browning
- Starring: Phil Silvers; Lee Remick; Jerry Lanning
- Country of origin: United States
- Original language: English

Production
- Executive producer: Alvin Cooperman
- Production location: NBC Brooklyn Studios
- Editor: Jack Shultis
- Running time: 100 minutes
- Production company: NBC

Original release
- Network: NBC
- Release: April 8, 1967

Damn Yankees! is a 1967 American TV adaptation directed by Kirk Browning of the 1955 baseball musical Damn Yankees, itself based on Douglass Wallop's 1954 novel The Year the Yankees Lost the Pennant.

Longtime sportscaster and NBC host Joe Garagiola supplied an on-camera setup to the background for the story's premise of envy of the successful New York Yankees team.

The pop-art production design and staging featured collage animation and early examples of color Chroma key compositing to achieve traveling mattes for TV. The principal cast supplied their own vocals for the soundtrack.

Recorded at NBC's Brooklyn Studios, it was "colorcast" on April 8, 1967 as a special production of General Electric Theater.

== Cast ==
- Lee Remick as Lola
- Phil Silvers as Applegate
- Jim Backus as Benny Van Buren
- Fran Allison as Mrs. Meg Boyd
- Jerry Lanning as Joe Hardy
- Ray Middleton as Joe Boyd
- Linda Lavin as Gloria Thorpe
- Bob Dishy as Rocky
