= Russ Brown (actor) =

American actor (1892–1964)

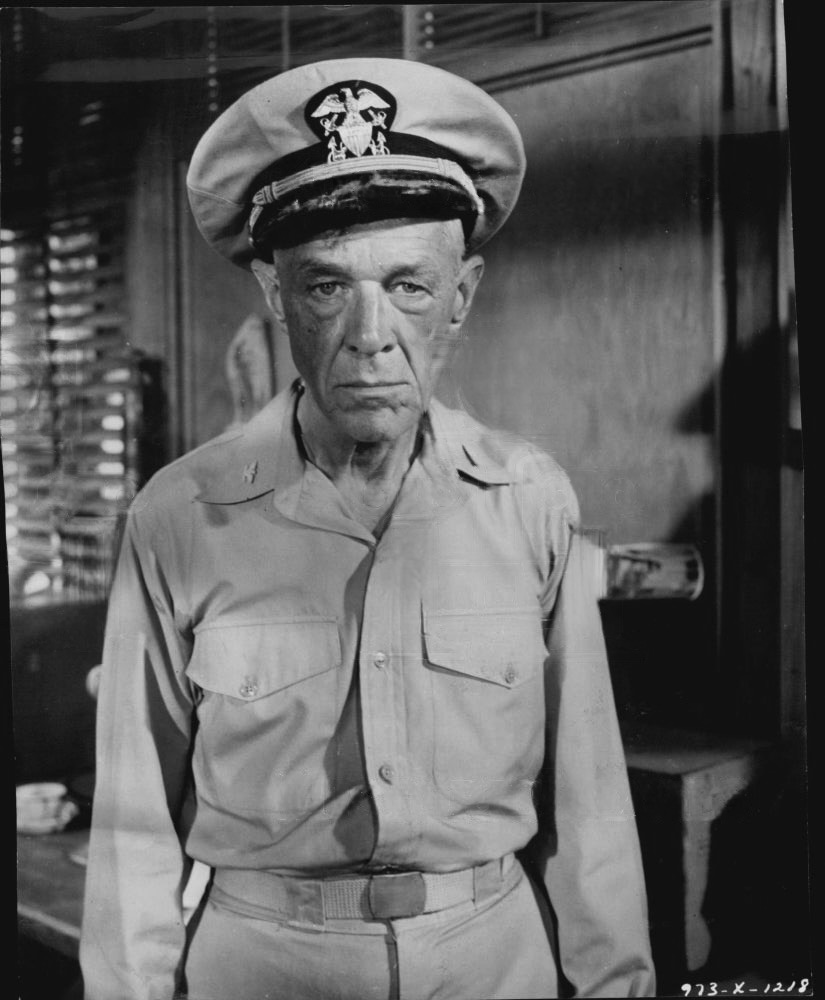
- Brown in 1958
- Born: Russell Brown; May 30, 1892; Philadelphia, Pennsylvania, U.S.
- Died: October 19, 1964 (aged 72); Englewood, New Jersey, U.S.
- Resting place: Kensico Cemetery, Valhalla, New York
- Occupation: Actor
- Years active: 1912–1964

Russ Brown (May 30, 1892 – October 19, 1964) was an American actor of stage, television, and screen. He is best known for his Tony Award-winning role of baseball manager Benny Van Buren in the 1955 Broadway musical Damn Yankees!, a role he reprised on film in 1958.

== Early life and career ==
Born Russell Brown in Philadelphia, Pennsylvania, he grew up in South Philadelphia. In his youth he sang as a boy soprano in his church's choir. He made his Broadway debut as a member of the chorus in the original production of The Firefly in 1912-1913. After this he toured the United States and Canada performing in vaudeville; getting stranded twice on tour, once in Fall River and once in Toronto.

Brown and Whitaker in a Vitaphone Varieties short from 1928

Brown returned to Philadelphia where he worked as a reporter for several Philadelphia newspapers. Eventually he returned to the stage performing in vaudeville in an act with Bert Wheeler. He married the actress Gertrude Whitaker during World War I, and the two performed in a vaudeville act together. It differed from the usual boy-and-girl act where the male partner played straight to the female partner's silly jokes; "Brown and Whitaker" had Brown as the wisecracking comedian and Whitaker as the solemn straight woman. They married in 1924 and divorced in 1930.

== Broadway ==
Brown's first leading role on Broadway was as Jimmy Ridgeway in Lewis E. Gensler's 1928 musical Ups-a Daisy. This was followed by the role of Sport in the 1930 musical Flying High in which he had particular success performing in the duet "Good for You, Bad for Me". He next starred on Broadway in two plays: Robert Carlyle in One Good Year (1935) and Pat Dunn in Louis Pelletier and Robert Sloane's Howdy Stranger (1937). In 1940-1941 he starred as Dinky in the Yip Harburg and Burton Lane musical Hold On to Your Hats; a character reused by the musical book's writing team, Guy Bolton and Eddie Davis, in several of their later musicals.

In 1941 Brown starred in the title role of the Broadway musical Viva O'Brien; a creation of the composer María Grever. It was an awful flop, running only 16 days. He returned to Broadway with better success as the press agent Bob Becket in George S. Kaufman's Hollywood Pinafore in 1945. In 1947 he starred as Timothy Moore in the revival of Herbert and Dorothy Fields Up in Central Park. This was followed by appearances in the plays The Biggest Thief in Town (1949, as Horton Paige) and Clutterbuck (1949–1950). In 1950 he starred in the title role of a national tour of Finian's Rainbow; a role which was reportedly the favorite of his career.

From 1955–1957, Brown starred as Benny Van Buren, the good-natured manager of the struggling Washington Senators baseball team, in the Richard Adler and Jerry Ross musical Damn Yankees! He scored a hit with the song "Ya Gotta Have Heart". For his stage performance in "Damn Yankees!", he earned the Tony Award for Best Featured Actor in a Musical in 1956; with his stage partners Ray Walston and Gwen Verdon along with choreographer Bob Fosse all winning Tony Awards for the same production. In 1959 Brown gave his final performance on Broadway portraying New York City mayor Fiorello La Guardia in the Jerry Bock and Sheldon Harnick musical Fiorello!

== Film and television ==
Brown made his screen debut in a short film for Radio Pictures, Russ Brown in "The Palooka Flying School" (1930). One of the early films to experiment with sound, it was deemed a "novelty chatter routine that's too smart for the average picture audience." This was followed by performances in the Broadway Brevities short film Footlights in December 1931, and the 1933 Vitaphone Varieties comic short film Pie a la Mode which features a baking contest that devolves into a pie-throwing fight.

Brown's first appearance in a feature film was as Joe in the 1934 Sidney Lanfield musical Moulin Rouge. This was followed by supporting roles in the feature films Let's Talk It Over (1934), The Love Captive (1934), and Sweet Surrender (1935); all for Universal Pictures.

Russ Brown returned to New York, where he was signed by Educational Pictures, a short-subject studio. There he appeared with one of Educational's star comedians, Bert Lahr, in three shorts, and the singing team of Niela Goodelle and Lee Sullivan in a fourth.

In 1940 Brown went back to Hollywood for the Joe Penner feature Millionaire Playboy. He did not appear in any more films for nearly two decades; until 1958 when made the two musical films he is best known for: Benny Van Buren in Damn Yankees and Captain Brackett in South Pacific. This was followed by significant supporting roles in two films in 1959: Uncle Otis in It Happened to Jane and George Lemon in the seminal film Anatomy of a Murder. His final film role was as Dr. Heller in The Cardinal (1963).

== Television ==
In 1951 Russ Brown made his television debut on the anthology series Pulitzer Prize Playhouse in the episode "Portrait of a President"; a tele-play about Andrew Jackson's presidential election based on the Pulitzer Prize winning biography by Marquis James. From 1960-1962 he portrayed the recurring character of Thomas Jones on the legal drama The Law and Mr. Jones. In 1963 he appeared on The Dick Powell Theatre opposite Lee Marvin in the tele-play "The Loosers".

== Death ==
Brown died on October 19, 1964, in Englewood, New Jersey. He is interred in Kensico Cemetery in Valhalla, New York.

== Filmography ==
Year	Title	Role	Notes
1934	Moulin Rouge	Joe	
1934	Let's Talk It Over	Bill	
1934	The Love Captive	Larry Chapman	
1935	Sweet Surrender	Jerry Burke	
1940	Millionaire Playboy	Mr. Bob Norman	
1958	South Pacific	Capt. Brackett, USN	
1958	Damn Yankees	Benny Van Buren	
1959	It Happened to Jane	Uncle Otis	
1959	Anatomy of a Murder	George Lemon	
1962	Advise & Consent	Night Watchman (Mike)	
1963	The Cardinal	Dr. Heller	
