= The Year the Yankees Lost the Pennant =

Book by Douglass Wallop

- First edition cover
- Author: Douglass Wallop
- Language: English
- Publisher: W. W. Norton & Co.
- Publication date: September 9, 1954
- Publication place: United States
- Media type: Print
- Pages: 250

The Year the Yankees Lost the Pennant is a 1954 novel by Douglass Wallop. It adapts the Faust theme of a deal with the Devil to the world of American baseball in the 1950s.

== Plot summary ==
The novel's protagonist, mild-mannered, middle-aged Joe Boyd, is depicted as a lifelong fan of the hapless Washington Senators. As the novel begins, the Senators are losing ground in the American League to their longtime nemesis, the New York Yankees.

The discouraged Boyd runs into an unexpected offer from a fast-talking confidence man, who introduces himself as "Mr. Applegate." "Applegate" offers to transform Joe Boyd into Joe Hardy, a young baseball superstar, and facilitate his signing with the Senators' front office so that Hardy can help salvage the Senators' lost season. Boyd, suspicious, negotiates with "Applegate" and extracts a promise that the transformation will only be temporary and, after helping the Senators win a suitable number of games, Hardy will be able to re-transfer himself back to his Joe Boyd personality.

The transformation takes place, Hardy joins the Senators, and all begins to develop as "Applegate" had predicted. However, the new baseball superstar begins to realize that his deal with "Applegate" may not be so temporary and he may have let himself in for more than he had expected. As Hardy's doubts grow over his predicament, "Applegate" presents Hardy with love interest Lola, depicted as a glamorous temptress in the style of the 1950s.

== Adaptations ==
The novel was adapted into the 1955 musical Damn Yankees. The musical's book was written by George Abbott and Douglass Wallop; its music and lyrics were written by Richard Adler and Jerry Ross. The musical starred Ray Walston as Applegate, Stephen Douglass as Joe Hardy and Gwen Verdon as Lola.

The 1958 film adaptation featured Tab Hunter as Joe. Hunter was the sole actor who had not been in the stage play.

Ray Middleton played Joe in the 1967 television film adaptation.

== Reception ==
Anthony Boucher dismissed the novel as "just another Pact-with-the-Devil story, somewhat brightened by its Major League baseball setting."

== See also ==
- Deal with the Devil
- Deals with the Devil in popular culture
