= Hurricane Smith =

Hurricane Smith may refer to:

- Norman Smith (record producer) (1923–2008), English recording engineer and producer who worked with the Beatles, aka Hurricane Smith
- Hurricane Smith (1941 film), American western
- Hurricane Smith (1952 film), American action/adventure feature
- Hurricane Smith (1992 film), Australian-American action/adventure feature
