= New Girl in Town =

- Music: Bob Merrill
- Lyrics: Bob Merrill
- Book: George Abbott
- Basis: Eugene O'Neill's play Anna Christie
- Productions: 1957 Broadway

New Girl in Town is a 1957 musical with a book by George Abbott and music and lyrics by Bob Merrill based on Eugene O'Neill's 1921 play Anna Christie, about a prostitute who tries to live down her past. New Girl, unlike O'Neill's play, focuses on the jealousy of the character Marthy and on love's ability to conquer all. The musical ends far more hopefully than the play.

== Background ==
The Broadway production opened on May 4, 1957 at the 46th Street Theatre, where it ran for 431 performances. The show was written as a star vehicle for Gwen Verdon, who had just had a hit with Damn Yankees and won raves for her portrayal of Lola, a role that showed off her acting, singing and dancing abilities to maximum effect. Composer Bob Merrill was at the beginning of a string of 1960s successes. New Girl in Town, produced by Frederick Brisson, Robert E. Griffith and Hal Prince, was well received by both critics and audiences. Verdon and co-star Thelma Ritter shared the Tony Award for Best Actress in a Musical, and the show received three other Tony nominations, including the Best Musical and best choreography for Bob Fosse. Verdon, somewhat unusually, had three standbys: one each for acting, singing and dancing.

== Synopsis ==
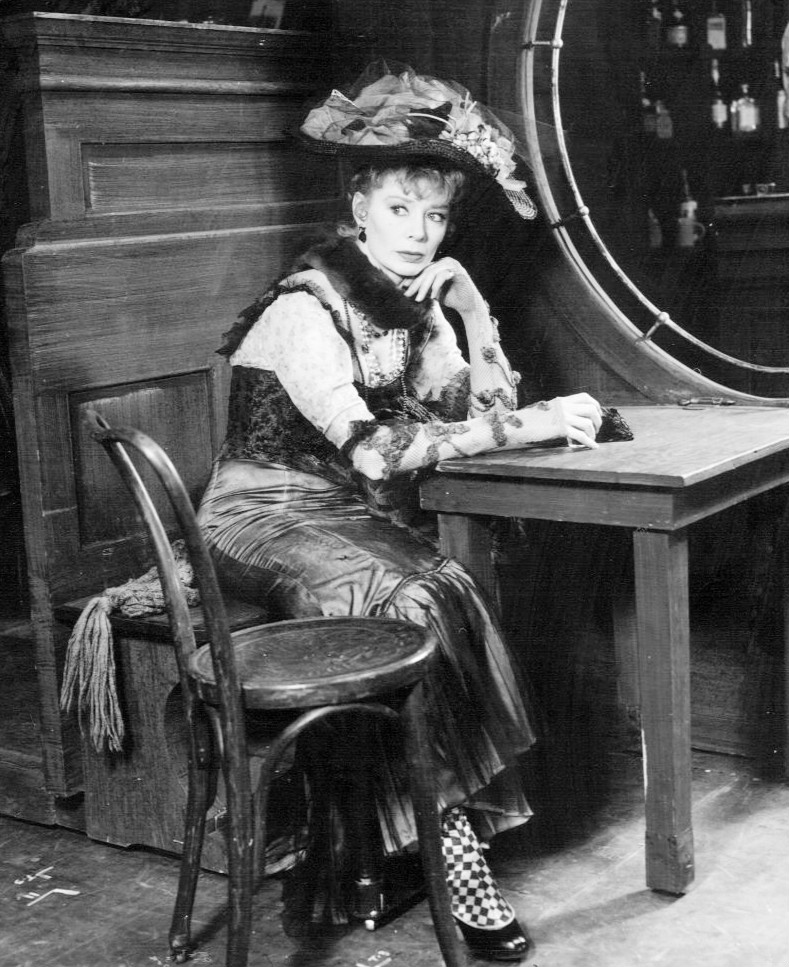
Gwen Verdon as Anna, 1957

Anna, a former streetwalker recovering from tuberculosis, returns home to live with her aging father, ex-sailor Chris Christopherson, in turn-of-the-20th century New York City after plying her trade in St. Paul, Minnesota for 15 years. Unaware of her sordid past, and remembering Anna as an innocent young girl, Chris joyfully welcomes his daughter home ("Anna Lilla"). Anna initially is welcomed by Chris's friends and seems to be finding happiness. She becomes romantically involved with a sailor, Mat Burke, but hides the relationship from her father. Chris is furious when Marthy, his jealous common-law wife, drunkenly reveals the truth about Anna's past. Anna's sailor leaves on the next ship, and her hopes of leading a normal life seem dashed, but Anna picks up the pieces of her life, becoming a farmer in Staten Island. When Mat finally returns to port, Chris tries to keep the two lovers apart, but their reunification is inevitable – time heals all wounds, and the lovers kiss and make up.

== Production notes ==
Choreographer Bob Fosse was eager to showcase the talents of star Gwen Verdon, for whom the show had been fashioned, but the material didn't lend itself to big song-and-dance routines. During rehearsals he devised a second act dream sequence that depicted life in a brothel through seductive and suggestive movement, and during its tryout run in New Haven, Connecticut, local police closed the show. Fosse restaged the number at director Abbott's request, but restored the original version soon after the New York City opening.

For Merrill, at the time best known for the 1952 novelty tune "(How Much Is) That Doggie in the Window?" popularized by Patti Page, this was a first attempt at a musical score. Only six songs were related directly to plot or character; the remainder were filler closely resembling typical musical comedy numbers, although New Girl is not a musical comedy in what was then the traditional sense.

The Broadway production opened on May 4, 1957 at the 46th Street Theatre, where it ran for 431 performances. The cast included Gwen Verdon as Anna, Cameron Prud'homme as Chris, Thelma Ritter as Marthy, and George Wallace as Mat.

== Song list ==
Act I

- Roll Yer Socks Up - Chorus
- Anna Lilla - Chris
- Sunshine Girl - Oscar, Pete, Bartender
- On the Farm - Anna
- Flings - Marthy, Lily, Pearl
- It's Good to Be Alive - Anna
- Look at 'Er - Mat
- It's Good to Be Alive (Reprise) - Mat
- Yer My Friend, Aintcha? - Marthy, Chris
- Did You Close Your Eyes? - Anna, Mat
- At the Check Apron Ball - Chorus
- There Ain't No Flies on Me - Anna and Company

Act II

- Ven I Valse - Anna, Chris, Chorus
- Sunshine Girl (Reprise) - Chorus
- If That Was Love - Anna
- Chess and Checkers - Marthy, Chorus
- Look at 'Er (Reprise) - Mat

A "Cathouse Ballet" was cut when the show tried out in Boston, possibly because it made Anna's former life as a prostitute appear far more appealing than her present circumstances. The producers went so far as to burn the scenery, in the alley behind the theatre, to prevent the sequence from being restored.

An original cast recording was released by RCA Victor, and both Carol Burnett and Martha Raye recorded "Flings."

== Principal characters ==
- Anna — Chris's long lost daughter
- Chris Christopherson — Anna's father; an old whiskey-drinking Swedish sailor
- Marthy — Chris's common-law wife; a jealous drunk
- Mat Burke — A simple-minded sailor

== Original Broadway cast ==
| Character | Performer |
|---|---|
| Anna | Gwen Verdon |
| Marthy | Thelma Ritter |
| Mat | George Wallace |
| Chris | Cameron Prud'homme |
| Bartender | Mark Dawson |
| Lily | Lulu Bates |
| Pete | Eddie Phillips |
| Alderman | Michael Quinn |
| Oscar | Del Anderson |
| Seaman/Politician | H.F. Green |

== Awards and nominations ==
=== Original Broadway production ===
| Year | Award | Category | Nominee | Result |
|---|---|---|---|---|
| 1958 | Tony Award | Best Musical | | Nominated |
| 1958 | Tony Award | Best Performance by a Leading Actress in a Musical | Gwen Verdon | Won |
| 1958 | Tony Award | Best Performance by a Leading Actress in a Musical | Thelma Ritter | Won |
| 1958 | Tony Award | Best Performance by a Featured Actor in a Musical | Cameron Prud'Homme | Nominated |
| 1958 | Tony Award | Best Choreography | Bob Fosse | Nominated |
