= The Day the Bookies Wept =

1939 film by Leslie Goodwins

- Theatrical release poster
- Directed by: Leslie Goodwins
- Screenplay by: Bert Granet; George Jeske
- Based on: Crazy Over Pigeons in 1939 Collier's by Daniel Fuchs
- Produced by: Robert Sisk
- Starring: Joe Penner; Betty Grable; Richard Lane; Tom Kennedy; Thurston Hall
- Cinematography: Jack MacKenzie
- Edited by: Desmond Marquette
- Music by: Arthur Morton
- Production company: RKO Pictures
- Distributed by: RKO Pictures
- Release date: September 15, 1939
- Running time: 64 minutes
- Country: United States
- Language: English

The Day the Bookies Wept is a 1939 American comedy film directed by Leslie Goodwins and written by Bert Granet and George Jeske. The film stars Joe Penner, Betty Grable, Richard Lane, Tom Kennedy and Thurston Hall. The film was released on September 15, 1939, by RKO Pictures.

== Plot ==
Pooling their resources, New York City taxi drivers–who are tired of losing money at the racetrack–designate Ernie Ambrose to go to Kentucky and buy them a racehorse. Ernie leaves behind his sweetheart Ina and spends all their money on a horse, relying on advice from a fake "colonel" by buying a nag called Hiccup.

The horse is useless until Ina discovers via the colonel that Hiccup has a taste for beer. At long odds, she bets $2,000 on the drunken horse to win, which it does, bankrupting bookies all over town.

== Cast ==
- Joe Penner as Ernest 'Ernie' Ambrose
- Betty Grable as Ina Firpo
- Richard Lane as Ramsey Firpo
- Tom Kennedy as Pinky Brophy
- Thurston Hall as Colonel March
- Bernadene Hayes as Margie
- Carol Hughes as Patsy
- Vinton Hayworth as Harry
- Emory Parnell as Motor Cop

== See also ==
- List of films about horse racing
