= Millionaire Playboy =

1940 film directed by Leslie Goodwins

- Directed by: Leslie Goodwins; Doran Cox (assistant)
- Screenplay by: Bert Granet; Charles E. Roberts
- Story by: Bert Granet
- Produced by: Robert Sisk
- Starring: Joe Penner; Linda Hayes; Russ Brown
- Cinematography: Jack MacKenzie
- Edited by: Desmond Marquette
- Music by: Paul Sawtell
- Production company: RKO Radio Pictures
- Distributed by: RKO Radio Pictures
- Release date: March 15, 1940 (US)
- Running time: 64 minutes
- Country: United States
- Language: English

Millionaire Playboy originally entitled Playboy No. 2 is a 1940 American comedy film directed by Leslie Goodwins from a screenplay by Bert Granet and Charles E. Roberts, based upon Granet's story. Produced and distributed by RKO Radio Pictures, it was released on March 15, 1940, and stars Joe Penner, Linda Hayes, and Russ Brown. It was Joe Penner's last film before he died in 1941.

== Plot ==
Joe Zany (Joe Penner) a hapless young socialite attempts to overcome an embarrassing romantic problem. It seems every time he kisses a girl, he gets a horrible case of hiccups. Anxious to cure him, his father spends a small fortune to take his son to a special psychologist who in turn sends Joe to a beautiful spa, owned by Lois Marlowe (Linda Hayes), filled with gorgeous young women.

== Cast ==
- Joe Penner as Joe Zany, aka Mr. Joe Potter
- Linda Hayes as Lois Marlowe
- Russ Brown as Mr. Bob Norman
- Fritz Feld as 'G.G.' Gorta
- Tom Kennedy as Tom Murphy
- Granville Bates as Stafford
- Arthur Q. Bryan as J.B. Zany
- Pamela Blake as Eleanor (as Adele Pearce)
- Diane Hunter as Hattie
- Mary Milford as Bertha
- Mantan Moreland as Bellhop
