= Go Chase Yourself =

1938 film by Edward F. Cline

- Theatrical release poster
- Directed by: Edward F. Cline
- Screenplay by: Paul Yawitz; Bert Granet
- Story by: Walter O'Keefe
- Produced by: Robert Sisk
- Starring: Joe Penner; Lucille Ball; Richard Lane; June Travis; Fritz Feld; Tom Kennedy
- Cinematography: Jack MacKenzie
- Edited by: Desmond Marquette
- Music by: Roy Webb
- Production company: RKO Pictures
- Distributed by: RKO Pictures
- Release date: April 22, 1938
- Running time: 70 minutes
- Country: United States
- Language: English

Go Chase Yourself is a 1938 American comedy film directed by Edward F. Cline and written by Paul Yawitz and Bert Granet. The film stars Joe Penner, Lucille Ball, Richard Lane, June Travis, Fritz Feld and Tom Kennedy. The film was released on April 22, 1938, by RKO Pictures.

== Plot ==
A milquetoast bank clerk finds himself stuck in a speeding trailer towed by gangsters after a bank robbery goes awry. Unfortunately for him, the police and even his own domineering wife believe that he is the robber and so head off in hot pursuit, precipitating a fast-paced merry chase.

== Cast ==
- Joe Penner as Wilbur Meeley
- Lucille Ball as Carol Meeley
- Richard Lane as Nails
- June Travis as Judy Daniels
- Fritz Feld as Count Pierre Fountaine de Louis-Louis
- Tom Kennedy as Icebox
- Granville Bates as Halliday
- Bradley Page as Frank
- George Irving as Mr. Daniels
- Arthur Stone as Warden
- Jack Carson as Warren Miles
- Frank M. Thomas as Police Chief

== Critical reception ==
Lionel Collier, writing for the British magazine, Picturegoer, commented that audiences who "like Joe Penner’s robust type of fooling" would "find this quick action farce very entertaining," adding, "it’s all very ingenuous but there are very good slapstick situations." He wrote that Joe Penner "is at his best and has good gags to put over", and that Lucille Ball "is spirited as his wife."
