= Rae Allen =

American actress (1926–2022)

- Allen in On a Clear Day You Can See Forever, 1965
- Born: Rae Julia Theresa Abruzzo; July 3, 1926; Brooklyn, New York, U.S.
- Died: April 6, 2022 (aged 95); Woodland Hills, California, U.S.
- Education: HB Studio; American Academy of Dramatic Arts; New York University (MFA)
- Occupation: Actress
- Years active: 1941–2011
- Spouses: John M. Allen (divorced) Herbert Harris (divorced)

Rae Julia Theresa Abruzzo (July 3, 1926 – April 6, 2022), professionally known as Rae Allen, was an American actress of stage, film and television. Her career spanned some seventy years and eight decades.

Allen started her career in theatre in 1941 in a production of Gilbert and Sullivan and made her debut on Broadway in 1948, moving to television and film roles in 1958, making her screen debut in Damn Yankees. She appeared in numerous guest roles in TV shows and was best known for recurring parts in sitcom All in the Family (1972–1973) and mob drama The Sopranos (2004). Her film roles included A League of Their Own (1992) and Stargate (1994).

== Biography ==
Allen was born Rae Julia Theresa Abruzzo in Brooklyn, New York City, on July 3, 1926, to Julia (née Riccio), a seamstress and hairdresser and Joseph Abruzzo, an opera singer and chauffeur, whose brothers acted in vaudeville.

At 15, Allen played Buttercup in H.M.S. Pinafore. She trained at the HB Studio in New York City's Greenwich Village. She graduated from the American Academy of Dramatic Arts in 1947. She first married and divorced John M. Allen then later married and divorced Herbert Harris.

== Theatre ==
Allen was nominated for the Tony Award three times: for Best Featured Actress in a Musical for Damn Yankees in 1956, and for Best Featured Actress in a Play for Traveller Without Luggage in 1965 and And Miss Reardon Drinks a Little in 1971, winning for the latter. In 1958, she recreated her role as nosy reporter Gloria in the first Damn Yankees film adaptation.

== Film and television ==
Allen appeared in such films as Reign Over Me, A League of Their Own, Stargate, and Where's Poppa? On television, she appeared in two episodes of Seinfeld as unemployment counselor Lenore Sokol, who must deal with George Costanza, who tries to get her to approve an extension of his benefits by dating her homely daughter, who ends up rejecting him. She also made appearances on television shows such as The Patty Duke Show, Hill Street Blues, All in the Family, Car 54 Where Are You, Head of the Class, Remington Steele, The Sopranos, and Grey's Anatomy.

== Death ==
Allen died in her sleep on April 6, 2022, at the age of 95, at the Motion Picture & Television Fund retirement community in Woodland Hills, California.

== Broadway theatre ==
=== Selected roles ===
- Damn Yankees (1954–1955)
- The Pajama Game (1954–1956)
- Oliver! (1963–1964)
- On a Clear Day You Can See Forever (1965)
- Fiddler on the Roof
- And Miss Reardon Drinks a Little (for which she won the 1971 Tony Award for Supporting Actress)
- Dude (1972)

== Filmography ==
=== Film and television ===
Title	Year	Role
Damn Yankees (film)	1958	Gloria Thorpe
The Untouchables (TV series)	1962	Sarro's Daughter (guest role) episode: The Economist
Car 54, Where Are You? (TV series)	1963	Miss Thelma Eisenberg (uncredited) guest role in Episode: Joan Crawford Didn't Didn't Say No
Profiles in Courage (TV series)	1964	Miss Darvon (guest role, episode: Mary S. McDowell
The Patty Duke Show (TV series)	1964	Miss McClintock (guest, episode: Can Do Patty)
The Tiger Makes Out (film)	1967	Beverly
Where's Poppa? (film)	1970	Gladys Hocheiser
Taking Off (film)	1971	Mrs. Divito
All in the Family (TV series)	1972–1973	Amelia/Amelia DeKuyper
Acts of Love and Other Comedies (TV film)	1973	Jeffreys' Wife
Madigan (TV series)	1973	Verna Bennerman
Medical Center (TV series)	1973	Rose
CBS Daytime 90 (TV series)	1974	Dommy (episode: Legacy of Fear)
Ace (TV movie)	1976	Gloria Ross
Phyl & Mikhy (TV series)	1980	Gwyn
Soap (TV series)	1980	Judge Betty Small
The Greatest American Hero (TV series)	1981	Edith Morabito
Lou Grant (TV series)	1982	Helen Paterson
Remington Steele (TV series)	1982	Kay Letrell (episode: Steele Water Run Deep)
Hill Street Blues	1982	Gloria Currie episode: Little Boil Blue
Scarecrow and Mrs. King (TV series)	1984	Sergeant Magovich
Faerie Tale Theatre (TV series)	1986	Aladdin's Mother
Moving (film)	1988	Dr. Phyllis Ames
Far Out Man (film)	1990	Holly
Equal Justice (TV series)	1990	Judge Cythia Russell
Head of the Class (TV series)	1990	Sofia
She Said No (TV film)	1990	Judge Gordon
Keeping Secrets (TV film)	1991	unknown
Face of A Stranger (TV film)	1991	Ruthie
Seinfeld (TV series)	1992	Mrs. Sokol
A League of Their Own (film)	1992	Ma Kellor
Brooklyn Bridge (TV series)	1993	Cousin Ruth
Calendar Girl (film)	1993	Mrs. McDonald
Angie (film)	1994	Aunt Violetta
Menendez: A Killing in Beverly Hills (TV film)	1994	Female Judge
Stargate (film)	1994	Barbara Shore, PhD
Hudson Street (TV series)	1995	Fran Canetti
L.A. Doctors (TV Series)	1998	Mildred Cattano
The Fearing Mind (TV series)	2000–2001	Lucy Fearing
Providence (TV series)	2002	Dr. Hallstrom
Borderline (TV film)	2002	Dr. Alma Burke
The 4th Tenor (film)	2002	Italian Lady
The Sopranos (TV series)	2004	Aunt Quintina Blundetto
Joan of Arcadia (TV series)	2004	Fortune Teller God
NYPD Blue (TV series)	2004	Bertha Kunitz
Love for Rent (film)	2005	Gwen
Grey's Anatomy (TV series)	2006	Ruth
The Hard Easy (film)	2006	Freddie
Reign Over Me (film)	2007	Adell Modell
The Meant to Be's (TV film)	2008	Eleanor Roosevelt
How to Be a Better American (TV film)	2010	Ruth
Vampire Mob (TV series)	2011	Carlina Grigiono
