= Gangs of Chicago =

1940 film

- Directed by: Arthur Lubin
- Written by: Karl Brown
- Produced by: Robert North (associate producer)
- Starring: Lloyd Nolan; Barton MacLane; Lola Lane
- Cinematography: Elwood Bredell
- Production company: Republic Pictures
- Distributed by: Republic Pictures
- Release date: June 1940
- Running time: 66 minutes
- Country: United States
- Language: English

For Gangs based in Chicago see Gangs in Chicago

Gangs of Chicago is a 1940 crime film, starring Lloyd Nolan, Barton MacLane, Lola Lane, Ray Middleton, Astrid Allwyn, and Horace McMahon. Alan Ladd has a small uncredited role.

== Plot ==
After the death of his corrupt father, young Matty Burns enrolls in law school, not to seek justice but to learn how to represent criminal organizations while remaining within the law. He graduates with roommate Bill Whitaker, a judge's son, and is invited to come live at the Whitaker farm, where June Whitaker finds herself attracted to her brother Bill's friend.

With a federal agent named Evans keeping a close eye on his activities, Matty becomes the legal mouthpiece of Jim Ramsey, a racketeer. Bill is beseeched by agent Evans to spy on his friend, which he does reluctantly at the urging of his law-abiding dad.

Ramsey and his moll, Virginia Brandt, don't trust Bill and spring a trap, catching him red-handed seeking evidence. Bill is seriously wounded by thug Pinky's gunshot and rushed to a doctor by Matty, his friend. Both later hide out at the family farm, where Ramsey and his men come to finish the job. They are vanquished, but Matty must now do time behind bars.

== Cast ==
- Lloyd Nolan as Matty Burns
- Barton MacLane as Jim Ramsey
- Lola Lane as June Whitaker
- Ray Middleton as Bill Whitaker
- Astrid Allwyn as Virginia
- Addison Richards as Evans
- Howard Hickman as Judge Whitaker
- Horace McMahon as Cry-Baby
- Dwight Frye as Pinky

== Production ==
The film was announced in March 1940 with Nolan and Lubin attached. Lubin had just finished directing Black Friday. Filming started in late March 1940. It was shot at Grand National Studios.

It was one of the last appearances of Dwight Frye.

== Reception ==
The Los Angeles Times said Nolan and Middleton are "very good, but it is really Lola Lane... who rings bells." The New York Times called it "a stock cops and robbers melodrama... the only surprise in the picture is the sincere performance turned in by Ray Middleton."

The film was banned in Chicago by the censors. However they allowed the film to be released there after Republic changed the title to Gangs of a City.

Diabolique called it "a classy B".
