= Moulin Rouge (1934 film) =

1934 film by Sidney Lanfield

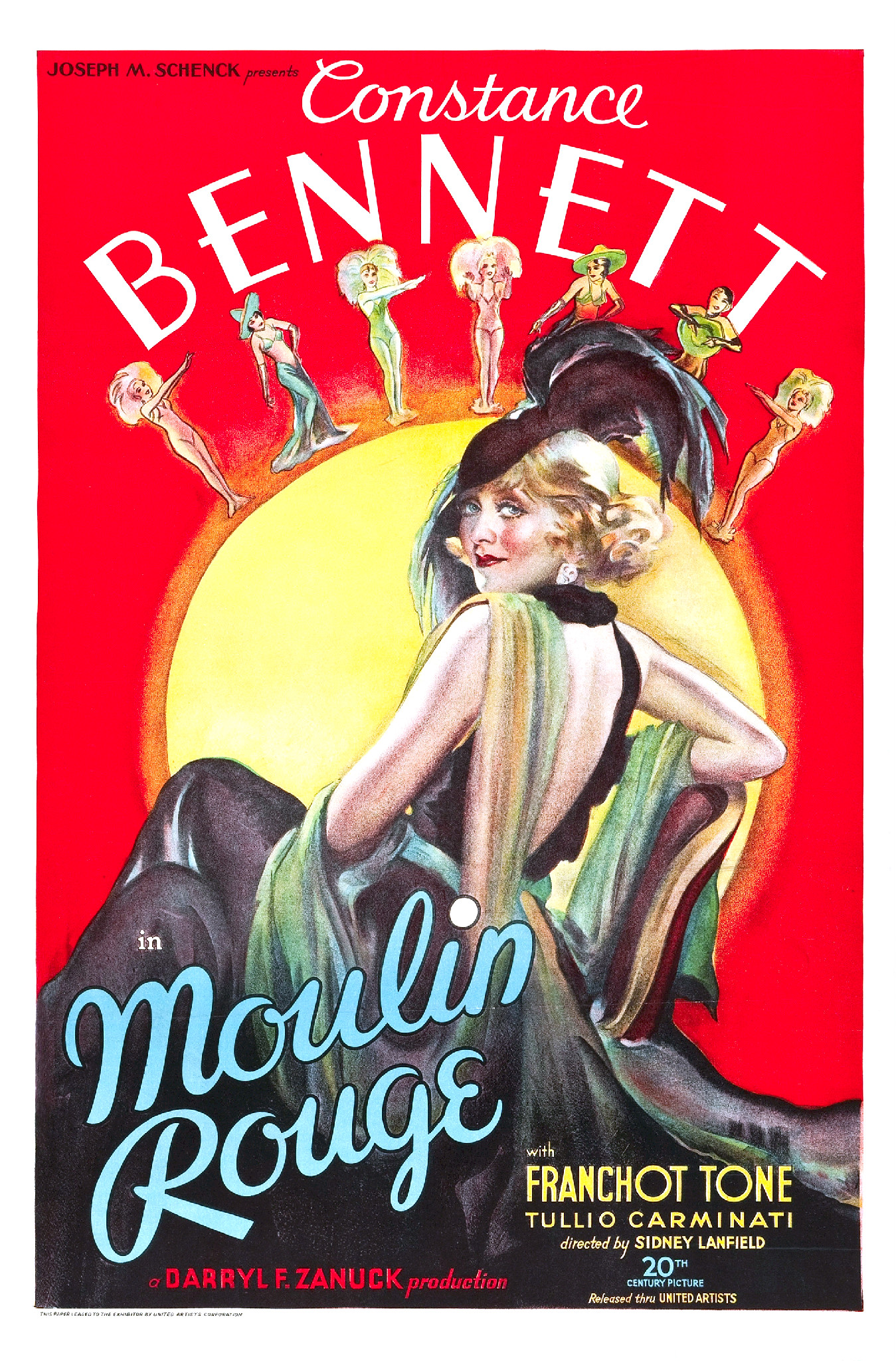
- Film poster
- Directed by: Sidney Lanfield
- Written by: Hans Kraly; Gregory La Cava; Sam Mintz
- Screenplay by: Nunnally Johnson; Henry Lehrman
- Produced by: William Goetz; Raymond Griffith; Darryl F. Zanuck
- Starring: Constance Bennett; Franchot Tone
- Cinematography: Charles Rosher
- Edited by: Lloyd Nibley; Lloyd Nosler
- Music by: Alfred Newman
- Production company: Twentieth Century Pictures
- Distributed by: United Artists
- Release date: January 19, 1934
- Running time: 70 minutes
- Country: United States
- Language: English

Moulin Rouge is an American pre-Code musical film released on January 19, 1934, by United Artists, starring Constance Bennett and Franchot Tone. It contained the songs "Coffee in the Morning and Kisses in the Night", and "Boulevard of Broken Dreams" with music by Harry Warren and lyrics by Al Dubin. Lucille Ball appears in an uncredited role as a show girl in the film. It has no relation to any other films of the same name. The cast also includes Tullio Carminati, Helen Westley, Russ Brown, Hobart Cavanaugh and Georges Renavent.

The film was Twentieth Century Pictures' fourth most popular movie of the year.

== Plot ==
A singer marries a famous composer, and after a while she gets the itch to go back on the stage. However, her husband will not let her do so. When she hears that a popular French singer named "Raquel" is coming to New York, she decides to go to Raquel with a plan—unbeknownst to her husband, "Raquel" is actually her old stage partner who happens to look EXACTLY like her, and her plan is for them to switch places so she can fulfill her dream of going back on the stage. However, things do not go quite as planned.

== Cast ==
- Constance Bennett as Helen Hall
- Franchot Tone as Douglas Hall
- Tullio Carminati as Le Maire
- Helen Westley as Mrs. Morris
- Russ Columbo as himself
- The Boswell Sisters as Themselves

== Soundtrack ==
- "The Boulevard of Broken Dreams"

Music by Harry Warren
Lyrics by Al Dubin
Performed by Constance Bennett in rehearsal
Reprised by Constance Bennett and chorus in the show finale

- "Coffee in the Morning and Kisses in the Night"

Music by Harry Warren
Lyrics by Al Dubin
Sung by Constance Bennett at audition
Reprised by Constance Bennett with Russ Columbo and also The Boswell Sisters in the show finale

- "Song of Surrender"

Music by Harry Warren
Lyrics by Al Dubin
Sung by Tullio Carminati while playing the piano
