= Alysha Umphress =

American actress and vocalist

- Umphress in 2026
- Born: March 9, 1982 (age 44); Concord, California, U.S.
- Spouse: Cody Williams

Alysha Umphress is an American actor and vocalist best known for her work in Broadway musicals. Notable roles include Hildy in On The Town, Patti in Smokey Joe's Cafe, Shirley in Priscilla Queen of the Desert, and Paula in On a Clear Day You Can See Forever.

== Career ==
Umphress graduated from the San Francisco School of the Arts and received a Bachelor of Fine Arts from Boston Conservatory before moving to New York City in 2004.

Umphress made her Broadway debut in 2010 as an ensemble member of American Idiot and has performed in venues around the country. She has performed in concerts and cabarets at such venues as 54 Below, Green Room 42, Williamstown Theatre Festival, Classic Stage Company, and more. Her recordings include On the Town, American Idiot, Bring it On!, Fugitive Songs, Alysha Umphress Live at the Laurie Beechman, and I've Been Played: Alysha Umphress Swings Jeff Blumenkrantz.

In 2015, Umphress was nominated for the Outstanding Lead Actress in a Musical (HAYES Production) Helen Hayes Award for her performance in Beaches at Signature Theatre. In 2019, she was nominated for a Lucille Lortel Award for Outstanding Featured Actress in a Musical for her performance in Smokey Joe's Cafe at Stage 42. In 2023, Umphress was the grand prize winner of the American Traditions Vocal Collection Competition. She has been announced as a vocalist on the upcoming concept album of the new musical The Fitzgeralds of St. Paul.

In 2018, New York Times critic Laura Collins-Hughes mentioned Alysha's body size in her review of Smokey Joe's Cafe, which many described as body-shaming. Collins-Hughes received pushback from the theatre community for her review. Alysha responded on Twitter by calling Collins-Hughes' writing "full on mean girl" and calling for a celebration of diversity in the arts.

Umphress met Cody Williams while working on a workshop of On The Town and they started dating in 2013. They were married in November 2017.

== Theatrical credits ==
Broadway
Production	Role	Year(s)
American Idiot	Ensemble	2010–2011
On a Clear Day You Can See Forever	Paula (understudy for Muriel Bunson, Melinda Wells)	2011–2012
Priscilla Queen of the Desert	Shirley	2012
Bring It On: The Musical	"Legendary" Soloist	2012
On The Town	Hildy	2014–2015

Off-Broadway/National Tour /Regional
Production	Role	Year(s)	Theatre
Bring It On: The Musical	"Legendary" Soloist	2011–2012	National tour
Beaches	Cecilia Carol "C.C." Bloom	2014	Signature Theatre
Pump Boys and Dinettes	Rhetta	2016	Paper Mill Playhouse
Hood: The Robin Hood Musical Adventure	Meg	2017	Dallas Theatre Center
Smokey Joe's Cafe	Ensemble	2018	Stage 42
Scotland, PA	Jessie	2019	Roundabout Theatre Company
Mr. Saturday Night	Susan	2021	Barrington Stage Company
The Bedwetter	Mrs. Dembo	2025	Arena Stage
Damn Yankees	Gloria Thorpe	2025	Arena Stage
