= The Love Captive =

1934 film by Max Marcin

- Directed by: Max Marcin
- Screenplay by: Karen DeWolf
- Based on: The Humbug; 1929 play by Max Marcin
- Produced by: Carl Laemmle, Jr.
- Starring: Gloria Stuart; Nils Asther; Paul Kelly; Alan Dinehart; Renee Gadd; Russ Brown
- Cinematography: Gilbert Warrenton
- Edited by: Ted J. Kent
- Production company: Universal Pictures
- Distributed by: Universal Pictures
- Release date: June 7, 1934
- Running time: 63 minutes
- Country: United States
- Language: English

The Love Captive is a 1934 American pre-Code drama film directed by Max Marcin and written by Karen DeWolf, adapted from Marcin's 1929 play The Humbug. The film stars Gloria Stuart, Nils Asther, Paul Kelly, Alan Dinehart, Renee Gadd, and Russ Brown. The film was released on June 7, 1934, by Universal Pictures.

== Plot ==
A diabolical hypnotist huckster is accused of casting spells on the minds of his female patients. Eventually a woman and her fiancé exact their revenge on him.

== Cast ==
- Gloria Stuart as Alice Trask
- Nils Asther as Dr. Alexis Collender
- Paul Kelly as Dr. Norman Ware
- Alan Dinehart as Roger Loft
- Renee Gadd as Valerie Loft
- Russ Brown as Larry Chapman
- Virginia Kami as Mary Williams
- John Wray as Jules Glass
- Ellalee Ruby as Annie Noland
- Addison Richards as Dr. Collins
- Robert Greig as First Butler
