= Whatever Lola Wants =

Song from the musical Damn Yankees

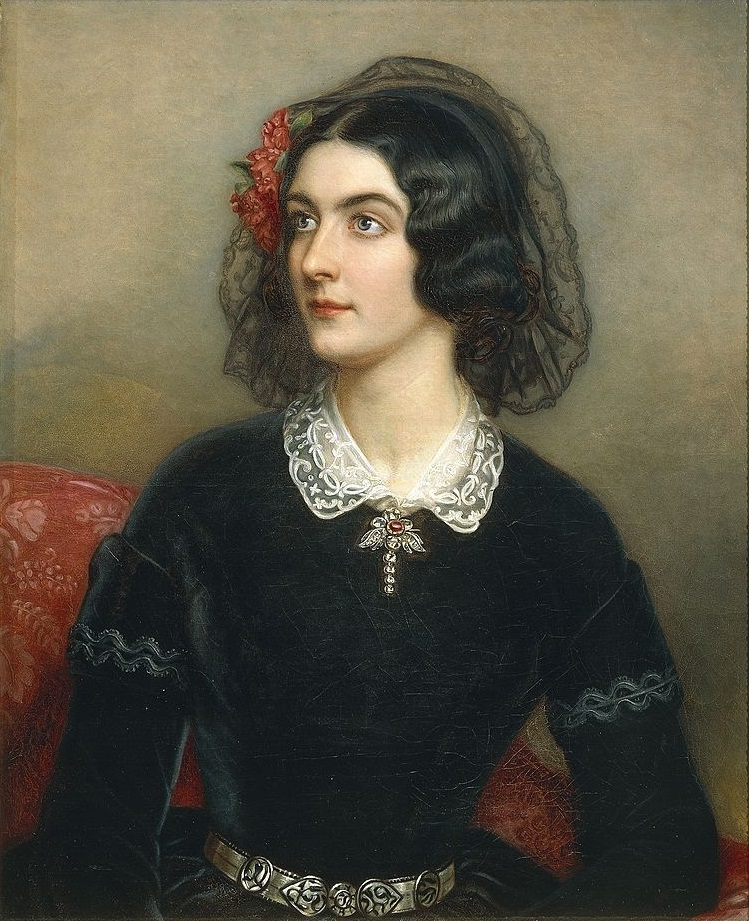
Portrait of Lola Montez by Joseph Karl Stieler, 1847.

"Whatever Lola Wants" is a popular song, sometimes rendered as "Whatever Lola Wants, Lola Gets". The music and words were written by Richard Adler and Jerry Ross for the 1955 musical play Damn Yankees. The song is sung to Joe Hardy by Lola, the Devil's assistant, a part originated by Gwen Verdon, who reprised the role in the film. The saying was inspired by Lola Montez, an Irish-born "Spanish dancer" and mistress of King Ludwig I of Bavaria, who later became a San Francisco gold rush vamp.

== Other recording artists ==
- Natacha Atlas
- Les Baxter
- Tony Bennett (1955)
- Ran Blake
- Lola Blanc
- Bob & Ray
- Les Brown
- Reeve Carney Live at Molly Malone's (2006)
- Petula Clark
- Alma Cogan (1957)
- Annie Cordy – French version Tout ce que veut Lola (1957)
- Xavier Cugat
- Carla Boni
- Chiwetel Ejiofor
- Gracie Fields
- Ella Fitzgerald (1963)
- Gotan Project
- The Hi-Lo's – A Musical Thrill (2006)
- Molly Johnson
- Louis Jordan
- Stan Kenton – The Stage Door Swings (1958)
- Eartha Kitt (1962)
- Abbe Lane (with Tito Puente and His Orchestra (1957)
- Marinella (1992, album I Marinella Tragouda Megales Kyries)
- Carmen McRae (1955)
- Amanda Lear: On album With Love (2006)
- Sophie Milman (2007, Live at Winter Garden Theatre)
- Bebe Neuwirth
- Caroline O'Connor
- Patti Page (1960)
- Perez Prado and His Orchestra (1955)
- Julius Pringles (2001)
- Della Reese on her Della Della Cha-Cha-Cha album (1961)
- Aldemaro Romero
- Dinah Shore (1955)
- Bria Skonberg (2017)
- Dee Snider for the Dee Does Broadway album (2012)
- Ruby Stewart
- Anthony Strong
- Mel Tormé for the album Mel Tormé Swings Shubert Alley (1960)
- Sarah Vaughan (1955)
- Gwen Verdon
- Baby Face Willette
- John Williams (Johnny Williams And His Orchestra, Rhythm In Motion, 1961)
- Kate McGarry, on Mercy Streets, 2025

== Other instances ==
"Whatever Lola Wants" is the title of an episode of the 2005 television series Hot Properties and the title of an episode of ABC-TV's 1965 crime drama Honey West.

The 2007 French-Canadian romantic drama film Whatever Lola Wants, directed by Nabil Ayouch and starring Laura Ramsey as Lola, premiered at the Dubai International Film Festival and was scheduled for release in France on 16 April 2008.

The Lola Car company is reportedly named after this song when company founder Eric Broadley heard the line "What Lola wants, Lola gets" in 1959.

Norman Bailey played the song as a trumpet solo on the first live television broadcast of The Lawrence Welk Show on July 2, 1955.

Chiwetel Ejiofor sang the song for the 2005 film Kinky Boots.

Mario Lopez and his partner Karina Smirnoff used the song in season 3 of Dancing with the Stars. Their tango to it was voted the best celebrity dance ever by the judges of Dancing with the Stars on their 100th episode. Several seasons later, Joanna Krupa and her temporary partner Maksim Chmerkovskiy performed an Argentine tango to the song in season 9.

The song was featured in the 2006 French film Hors de Prix (English title: Priceless) starring Gad Elmaleh and Audrey Tatou.

The song appeared in a 2011 Diet Pepsi commercial featuring Sofia Vergara and David Beckham, and in a 2014 Magnum Italian commercial, celebrating the 25th anniversary of the ice cream brand owned by the British/Dutch Unilever.

In the Pen15 episode "Bat Mitzvah", Becca (Sami Rappoport) sings "Whatever Lola Wants" as she enters her bat mitzvah reception.
