= Thelma Ritter =

American actress (1902–1969)

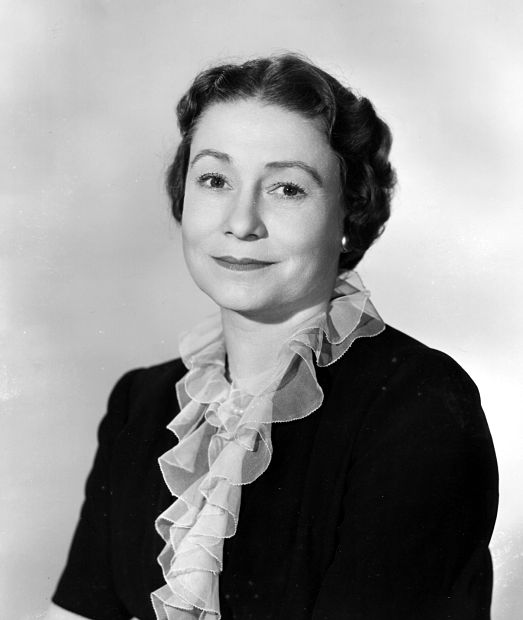
- Ritter in All About Eve (1950)
- Born: February 14, 1902; New York City, U.S.
- Died: February 5, 1969 (aged 66); New York City, U.S.
- Occupation: Actress
- Years active: 1913–1968
- Spouse: Joseph Moran (m. 1927)
- Children: 2

Thelma Ritter (February 14, 1902 – February 5, 1969) was an American character actress known for her strong New York City accent, diminutive size, and plain look; she favored working-class roles and earned a Tony Award and six Academy Award nominations for Best Supporting Actress, more than any other actress in the category.

These nominations were for her performances in All About Eve (1950), The Mating Season (1951), With a Song in My Heart (1952), Pickup on South Street (1953), Pillow Talk (1959), and Birdman of Alcatraz (1962). Her other film roles include those in Miracle on 34th Street (1947), Rear Window (1954), The Misfits (1961), and How the West Was Won (1962).

Ritter shared the 1958 Tony Award for Best Actress in a Musical for performance in the musical New Girl in Town with her co-star Gwen Verdon. She received a Primetime Emmy Award for Outstanding Supporting Actress in a Drama Series nomination for Goodyear Television Playhouse in 1956.

== Early and personal life ==
Thelma Ritter was born on February 14, 1902, in Brooklyn, New York, the first child of Charles and Lucy Ritter. Her father was a bookkeeper, later an office manager.

At age 11, Ritter played Puck in a semiprofessional dramatic society's production of A Midsummer Night's Dream. As a teenager, she appeared in high-school plays and stock companies. After initially being rebuffed, she received formal training at the American Academy of Dramatic Arts upon her graduation from Manual Training High School in Park Slope, Brooklyn.

Although she subsequently struggled to establish a stage career, Ritter decided to take a hiatus from acting to raise her two children, Monica and Joe. Their father, her husband, Joseph Moran, was also an actor. In the mid-1930s, he changed professions, becoming an actors' agent and then an advertising executive.

== Career ==
Ritter's first professional experience came with stock theater companies in New York and New England. Her Broadway credits include UTBU (1965), New Girl in Town (1956), In Times Square (1931), and The Shelf (1926).

Ritter's first movie role was in Miracle on 34th Street (1947). She made a memorable impression in a brief uncredited part, as a frustrated mother unable to find the toy that Kris Kringle has promised her son. Her third role, in writer-director Joseph L. Mankiewicz's A Letter to Three Wives (1949), left a mark, although Ritter was again uncredited. Mankiewicz kept Ritter in mind and cast her as Birdie Coonan in All About Eve (1950), which earned her an Oscar nomination. A second nomination followed for her work in the Mitch Leisen ensemble screwball comedy The Mating Season (1951) starring Gene Tierney and John Lund. Shortly before the film's release, syndicated columnist Bob Thomas called her Hollywood's "most talked-about new starlet". She enjoyed steady film work into the late 1960s.

She appeared in many of the episodic drama TV series of the 1950s and 1960s, such as Alfred Hitchcock Presents, General Electric Theater, and The United States Steel Hour Her other film roles were as James Stewart's nurse in Rear Window (1954) and Doris Day's housekeeper, Alma, in Pillow Talk (1959). Although best known for comedy roles, she played the occasional dramatic role, most notably in With a Song in My Heart (1952), Pickup on South Street (1953), Titanic (1953), The Misfits (1961), and Birdman of Alcatraz (1962), for which she received her final Oscar nomination. Her last work was an appearance on The Jerry Lewis Show on January 23, 1968.

== Death ==
On January 27, 1969, Ritter suffered a heart attack at her residence in Queens, New York City. She died from a second heart attack on February 5, in New York City, at age 66.

== Legacy ==
In 2019, Ritter was listed in an Evening Standard list of 10 women who changed the face of film forever.

== Work ==
=== Film ===
Year	Title	Role	Director	Notes
1947	Miracle on 34th Street	Peter's Mother	George Seaton	Uncredited
1948	Call Northside 777	Receptionist	Henry Hathaway	Uncredited
1949	A Letter to Three Wives	Sadie Dugan	Joseph L. Mankiewicz	Uncredited
1949	City Across the River	Mrs. Katie Cusack	Maxwell Shane	
1949	Father Was a Fullback	Geraldine	John M. Stahl	
1950	Perfect Strangers	Lena Fassler	Bretaigne Windust	
1950	I'll Get By	Miss Murphy	Richard Sale	
1950	All About Eve	Birdie Coonan	Joseph L. Mankiewicz	
1951	The Mating Season	Ellen McNulty	Mitchell Leisen	
1951	As Young as You Feel	Della Hodges	Harmon Jones	
1951	The Model and the Marriage Broker	Mae Swasey	George Cukor	
1952	With a Song in My Heart	Clancy	Walter Lang	
1953	Titanic	Maude Young	Jean Negulesco	
1953	Pickup on South Street	Moe Williams	Samuel Fuller	
1953	The Farmer Takes a Wife	Lucy Cashdollar	Henry Levin	
1954	Rear Window	Stella	Alfred Hitchcock	
1955	Daddy Long Legs	Alicia Pritchard	Jean Negulesco	
1955	Lucy Gallant	Molly Basserman	Robert Parrish	
1956	The Proud and Profane	Kate Connors	George Seaton	
1959	A Hole in the Head	Sophie Manetta	Frank Capra	
1959	Pillow Talk	Alma	Michael Gordon	
1961	The Misfits	Isabelle Steers	John Huston	
1961	The Second Time Around	Aggie Gates	Vincent Sherman	
1962	Birdman of Alcatraz	Elizabeth Stroud	John Frankenheimer	
1962	How the West Was Won	Agatha Clegg	John Ford; Henry Hathaway; George Marshall	
1963	For Love or Money	Chloe Brasher	Michael Gordon	
1963	Move Over, Darling	Grace Arden	Michael Gordon	
1963	A New Kind of Love	Leena	Melville Shavelson	
1965	Boeing Boeing	Bertha	John Rich	
1967	The Incident	Bertha Beckerman	Larry Peerce	
1968	What's So Bad About Feeling Good?	Mrs. Schwartz	George Seaton	final film role

=== Television ===
Year	Title	Role	Notes
1954	Lux Video Theatre	Lux Video Theatre Guest	Episode: Christmas in July
1955	The Best of Broadway	Mrs. Fisher	Episode: The Show-Off
1955	The 20th Century Fox Hour	Abby	Episode: Christopher Bean
1955	Goodyear Television Playhouse	Aggie Hurley	Episode: The Catered Affair
1956	Alfred Hitchcock Presents	Lottie Slocum	Season 1 Episode 32: The Baby Sitter
1957	Telephone Time	Mary Devlin	Episode: Plot to Save a Boy
1957	The United States Steel Hour	Ma Garfield	Episode: The Human Pattern
1960	GE True Theatre	Doris Green	Episode: Sarah's Laughter
1960	Startime	Mrs. Gillis	Episode: The Man
1961	Frontier Circus	Bertha Marie Beecher	Episode: Journey from Hannibal
1962	Wagon Train	Madame Sagittarius	Episode: The Madame Sagittarius Story

=== Theatre ===
Year	Title	Role	Notes
1926	The Shelf	Miss Batterson	Morosco Theatre, Broadway
1931	In Times Square	Sally Stewart	Longacre Theatre, Broadway
1957	New Girl in Town	Marthy	46th Street Theatre, Broadway
1966	UTBU	Shirley Amber	Hayes Theatre, Broadway

=== Radio ===
Year	Program	Notes	Ref.
1953	Theatre Guild on the Air	Episode: A Square Peg	

== Awards and nominations ==
Ritter received six Academy Award nominations during her career, without a win. This ties her with Deborah Kerr and Amy Adams with the second most such nominations among actresses, behind Glenn Close’s eight. Peter O'Toole also has eight without a win among men. Only Kerr, O’Toole and Close have received honorary awards from the Academy.

In 1955 Ritter co-hosted the Oscar ceremony, notably trading wisecracks with Bob Hope.

Association	Year	Category	Performance	Result	Ref.
Academy Awards	1950	Best Supporting Actress	All About Eve	Nominated	
Academy Awards	1951	Best Supporting Actress	The Mating Season	Nominated	
Academy Awards	1952	Best Supporting Actress	With a Song in My Heart	Nominated	
Academy Awards	1953	Best Supporting Actress	Pickup on South Street	Nominated	
Academy Awards	1959	Best Supporting Actress	Pillow Talk	Nominated	
Academy Awards	1962	Best Supporting Actress	Birdman of Alcatraz	Nominated	
Golden Globe Awards	1950	Best Supporting Actress - Motion Picture	All About Eve	Nominated	
Golden Globe Awards	1951	Best Supporting Actress - Motion Picture	The Mating Season	Nominated	
Golden Globe Awards	1965	Best Supporting Actress - Motion Picture	Boeing Boeing	Nominated	
Primetime Emmy Awards	1956	Best Actress in a Supporting Role	Goodyear Television Playhouse	Nominated	
Tony Awards	1958	Best Actress in a Musical	New Girl in Town	Won	
