= Damn Yankees (1958 film) =

1958 film by George Abbott and Stanley Donen

- Theatrical release poster
- Directed by: George Abbott; Stanley Donen
- Screenplay by: George Abbott
- Based on: Damn Yankees by; George Abbott; Douglass Wallop; Richard Adler; Jerry Ross; The Year the Yankees Lost the Pennant by Douglass Wallop
- Produced by: George Abbott; Stanley Donen
- Starring: Tab Hunter; Gwen Verdon; Ray Walston
- Cinematography: Harold Lipstein
- Edited by: Frank Bracht
- Music by: Richard Adler; Jerry Ross
- Distributed by: Warner Bros. Pictures
- Release date: September 19, 1958
- Running time: 111 minutes
- Country: United States
- Language: English
- Box office: $2.6 million

Damn Yankees is a 1958 American musical supernatural sports romantic comedy film. It was directed by George Abbott and Stanley Donen from a screenplay by Abbott, adapted from his and Douglass Wallop's book of the 1955 musical of the same title with music and lyrics by Richard Adler and Jerry Ross, itself based on the 1954 novel The Year the Yankees Lost the Pennant by Wallop. The story line is a take on the Faust legend and centers on the New York Yankees and Washington Senators baseball teams. With the exception of Tab Hunter in the role of Joe Hardy (replacing Stephen Douglass), the Broadway principals reprise their stage roles, including Gwen Verdon as Lola.

A notable difference between the film and stage versions was Gwen Verdon's performance of the song "A Little Brains". Verdon's suggestive hip movements (as choreographed by Bob Fosse and performed on stage) were considered too risqué for a mainstream 1958 American audience, and so she simply pauses at these points in the film. The title was unacceptable in the United Kingdom, where "damn" was a vulgarism and "yankees" was a derogatory term for Americans. The British branch of Warner Bros. Pictures changed the title to What Lola Wants.

== Plot ==
Joe Boyd (Robert Shafer) is a middle-aged fan of the unsuccessful Washington Senators baseball team. His obsession with baseball is driving a wedge between him and his wife, Meg—a problem shared by many other wives of Senators supporters. Meg leads them in lamenting their husbands' fixation with the sport ("Six Months Out of Every Year"). Joe is furious that his team has lost again. Meg, realizing that her husband isn't even listening to her, retires for the night, leaving Joe alone.

Joe rashly declares that he would sell his soul to the Devil to see his team beat the New York Yankees. No sooner has he spoken than the Devil appears before him in the guise of a suave con man, Mr. Applegate. Applegate claims he can improve on Joe's wish—he can restore Joe's youth, making him the player who wins the pennant for Washington. Joe agrees but insists that Applegate must give him an escape clause. Applegate declares that Joe can back out, but only the day before the last game of the season—afterward, his soul belongs to the Devil. Joe bids an emotional farewell to a sleeping Meg ("Goodbye Old Girl"), after which Applegate transforms him into a dashing young man, now called Joe Hardy.

The next day, the Senators' practice is a fiasco. Their manager, Benny Van Buren, gives the team a rousing pep talk ("Heart"). Applegate arrives and, introducing himself as a scout, presents his new discovery—Joe Hardy from Hannibal, Missouri. Joe promptly hits baseball after baseball out of the park in an impromptu batting practice. As he is signed to a Senators contract, sportswriter Gloria Thorpe plans to quickly get Joe into the public eye ("Shoeless Joe from Hannibal, Mo.").

With tremendous home runs and game-saving catches, Joe leads the Senators on a long winning streak into pennant contention and becomes a national hero. Joe misses Meg dreadfully, however, and keeps sneaking back to his old neighborhood for a glimpse of her ("There's Something about an Empty Chair"). Applegate, realizing this could ruin his plans, summons his demonic right-hand girl, Lola, a seductress who was once known as "the ugliest woman in Providence, Rhode Island," but sold her soul to Applegate in exchange for eternal youth and beauty. She is ordered to make Joe forget his wife, a task Lola is confident she can carry out ("A Little Brains, A Little Talent").

Joe succeeds in getting close to Meg by renting a room in his old house; Meg is unaware of his baseball stardom. Applegate and Lola corner Joe in the team's locker room, where Lola confidently tries to seduce Joe ("Whatever Lola Wants"). But she has her first failure—Joe dearly loves Meg and does not fall for Lola's charms. Applegate angrily banishes Lola. He fondly recalls his other evil misdeeds throughout history ("Those Were the Good Old Days").

By the end of the season, the Senators are on the verge of overtaking the Yankees, so the Washington fans hold a lavish tribute ("Who's Got the Pain?"). Applegate, however, plans for the Senators to lose the pennant on the last day of the season, resulting in thousands of heart attacks, nervous breakdowns and suicides of Yankee-haters across the country. Gloria, having discovered that no residents of Hannibal, Missouri, remember any "Joe Hardy," confronts Applegate about the player's true identity. Applegate implies that Joe is actually Shifty McCoy, a corrupt minor leaguer playing under a pseudonym. By the end of the tribute, newspapers arrive accusing Joe of being Shifty. He must meet with the baseball commissioner for a hearing or else be thrown out of baseball—on the day he plans to switch back to being Joe Boyd.

Applegate will claim Joe's soul at midnight. As the hearing approaches the deadline, Meg and her friends arrive as material witnesses, attesting to Joe's honesty and falsely claiming he grew up with them in Hannibal. The commissioner acquits Joe, but as everyone celebrates, midnight strikes and Joe realizes he is doomed.

After the hearing, Lola lets Joe know she has drugged Applegate so that he will sleep through the last game. They commiserate over their condemned situation at a nightclub ("Two Lost Souls"). Late the next afternoon, Applegate awakens to find the Senators/Yankees game well underway. Realizing Lola has tricked him—and worse, that Lola has actually fallen in love with Joe—he turns her back into an ugly hag.

The duo arrive at the ballpark by the ninth inning, the Senators up by a run. With two outs and a runner on base, Yankees slugger Mickey Mantle hits a long drive to centerfield. As Joe backs up to make the catch, Applegate impulsively switches him back into Joe Boyd in full view of the stadium. Now paunchy and middle-aged, Joe makes a final lunge at the ball and catches it, winning the pennant for Washington. As his teammates celebrate and fans storm the field, an unrecognized Joe runs through the clubhouse door in centerfield, retrieving his street clothes and escaping from the ballpark.

Late that night, as the public wonders why Joe Hardy has disappeared, Joe Boyd meekly returns to his house. A tearful Meg hugs him and they sing to each other ("There's Something about an Empty Chair", reprise). Applegate materializes once again and offers Joe the chance to resume being Joe Hardy in time for the World Series; he also makes Lola young and beautiful again to tempt Joe. Joe ignores him, and a tantrum-throwing Applegate vanishes for good.

== Cast ==
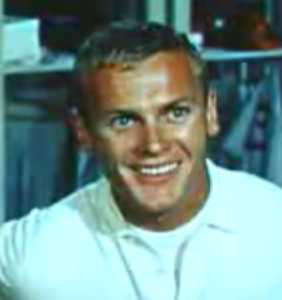
Hunter as Joe Hardy

- Tab Hunter as Joe Hardy, a younger version of Joe Boyd
- Gwen Verdon as Lola, Applegate's demonic servant
- Ray Walston as Applegate, the Devil in disguise
- Russ Brown as Benny Van Buren, the Washington Senators manager
- Shannon Bolin as Mrs. Meg Boyd, Joe Boyd's wife
- Robert Shafer as Joe Boyd, a fan of the Washington Senators
- Rae Allen as Gloria Thorpe, reporter
- Nathaniel Frey as Smokey, Senators player (short and stocky)
- James Komack as Rocky, Senators player (young and dumb)
- Albert Linville as Vernon, Senators player (tall and balding)
- Jean Stapleton as Sister Miller, Meg's friend
- Elizabeth Howell as Doris Miller, Meg's friend
- Bob Fosse as Mambo Dancer (uncredited)
- Phil Arnold as Newsstand Owner
- Harry Wilson as Spectator (uncredited)

Uncredited in archive footage are Yogi Berra, Mickey Mantle, Bill Skowron, and other New York Yankees baseball players, plus Art Passarella (umpire)

== Production ==
The film followed the same template as The Pajama Game in that basically the entire Broadway cast was imported apart from one role given to an established star. In Pajama Game it had been Doris Day, in Damn Yankees it was Tab Hunter, who had become a pop star in addition to being an actor.

Hunter said George Abbott insisted on specific line readings, which the actor found difficult. Also, according to Hunter's memoir, when he suggested a creative change in a particular scene, Abbott refused to consider it. When Hunter asked why, Abbott said "Because that's not how we did it in the stage version." Hunter then wondered why Abbott was considered such a highly revered visionary.

== Song list ==
- "Overture" — Orchestra
- "Six Months Out of Every Year" — Joe Boyd, Meg Boyd, and chorus
- "Goodbye Old Girl" — Joe Boyd/Joe Hardy
- "(You've Got to Have) Heart" — Benny, Smokey, Rocky, Vernon
- "Shoeless Joe from Hannibal, Mo." — Gloria and the team (as a Hoedown)
- "There's Something About an Empty Chair" — Meg Boyd
- "Whatever Lola Wants" — Orchestra
- "A Little Brains, a Little Talent" — Lola
- "Whatever Lola Wants" — Lola
- "Those Were the Good Old Days" — Mr. Applegate
- "Who's Got the Pain" — Lola and Mambo dancer (Bob Fosse)
- "Two Lost Souls" — Lola and Joe Hardy
- "There's Something About an Empty Chair (reprise)" — Joe Boyd and Meg Boyd

The "Overture" and "Two Lost Souls" are noticeably different from the Broadway production in orchestration, and many of the lines in "Six Months Out of Every Year" were cut from the film. "A Little Brains, a Little Talent" has a few lyrical differences.

Some songs appear in different order than the original Broadway and subsequent versions, and some songs ("Near to You", "The Game", "A Man Doesn't Know", and "Heart (Reprise)") were cut entirely, which left Tab Hunter with very few songs. (An instrumental of the chorus of "The Game" appears in the overture and at various points in the film.) "There's Something About an Empty Chair" was not in the original stage version or in any stage versions since. While Bob Fosse is not credited for the Mambo number, Tab Hunter thanks him by name ("That was terrific, Bobby!") as the dancer goes backstage.

== Reception ==
Gwen Verdon later said "I don't think it looks like a movie... I think it looks like a stage show, which is not good. And I'm sure Stanley, who had done great movies, did not want to shoot it that way, but he did it out of deference to George."

Reviews from critics were generally positive. Bosley Crowther of The New York Times wrote that Verdon's performance was "one of the hottest and heartiest we've seen years ... Miss Verdon has the sort of fine, fresh talent that the screen badly needs these days. But lest she seem to be the whole show, let us hasten to proclaim that there's a great deal more to Damn Yankees than this wonderful red-headed dame. Like the George Abbott stage show before it, it has class, imagination, verve, and a good many of the same performers who did so charmingly by it on Broadway".

Variety wrote: "That 10 of the top 11 players, plus creators from writer to costume designer, have been transferred en masse from Broadway just about insures a film that is as least as good as its stage counterpart. What stands out like an inside-the-park home run is the skill and inventiveness with which the film is coated, thus making Damn Yankees a funny picture",

Trade publisher Pete Harrison of Harrison's Reports called the film "a generally entertaining show even though it does not rate a rave notice. In treatment and presentation it is, for the most part, very much like a photographed stage play, in spite of the fact that the camera allowed for a wider range of activity".

Richard L. Coe of The Washington Post wrote of the play's transition to the screen, "It could be argued that perhaps it follows too closely, that this is too clearly a photographed stage musical. That I didn't mind in the least, because Damn Yankees is a swell musical comedy and I'm a sucker for musical comedy".

John McCarten of The New Yorker found Walston and Verdon "just as delightful" on the screen as they were in the stage version, adding, "Although expository dialogue occasionally hobbles the proceedings, Damn Yankees is for the most part commendably brisk, and the music and lyrics, by Richard Adler and Jerry Ross, are uniformly lively".

A somewhat mixed review in The Monthly Film Bulletin praised Verdon as bringing "great presence and a neatly sardonic humor" to the film while describing the score as "pleasant but unmemorable", and summarized the picture as "a musical made with a great deal of verve and some wit, but without much natural gaiety".

On the film review site Rotten Tomatoes, Damn Yankees has a score of 76% out of 21 reviews. The film opened in Denver at the Centre Theatre and grossed $17,000 in its opening week (equivalent to $203,810 in 2025) . After expanding it became number two at the U.S. box office in the last week of September before moving to number one a week later during the World Series between the New York Yankees and the Milwaukee Braves, displacing Cat on a Hot Tin Roof.

== Accolades ==
Award	Category	Nominee(s)	Result	Ref.
Academy Awards	Best Scoring of a Musical Picture	Ray Heindorf	Nominated	
British Academy Film Awards	Most Promising Newcomer to Film	Gwen Verdon	Nominated	
Directors Guild of America Awards	Outstanding Directorial Achievement in Motion Pictures	George Abbott and Stanley Donen	Nominated	
Golden Globe Awards	Best Motion Picture – Musical		Nominated	
Laurel Awards	Top Musical		Nominated	
Laurel Awards	Top Male Musical Performance	Tab Hunter	4th Place	
Laurel Awards	Top Female Musical Performance	Gwen Verdon	Nominated	
Writers Guild of America Awards	Best Written American Musical	George Abbott	Nominated	

=== Other honors ===
The film is recognized by American Film Institute in these lists:

- 2004: AFI's 100 Years...100 Songs:
  - "Whatever Lola Wants" – Nominated
- 2006: AFI's Greatest Movie Musicals – Nominated
- 2008: AFI's 10 Top 10:
  - Nominated Sports Film

== Locations ==
Most of the baseball action specific to the movie was filmed at Los Angeles' Wrigley Field, a site often used in the 1950s for Hollywood films about baseball. With the minor league Angels no longer operating, the ballpark was available. Filming was done in the spring of 1958.[Los Angeles Times, May 27, 1958, p. 63]

The film also contains stock footage of action at Griffith Stadium in Washington (the actual home of the Senators)—including the high green wall that protruded into the centerfield area marked 408 feet—which gave author Douglas Wallop the plot device that allowed Joe to escape from the ballpark after the final out. However, Joe's actual escape from the field was filmed in deep center at Wrigley, with its 412 sign visible above the door, and ivy covering the walls which did not exist at Griffith.

The Griffith stock footage includes a couple of clips of Senators slugger Roy Sievers, wearing uniform number 2, which was the number assigned to the fictional Joe Hardy. The filming at Griffith was done in early July, 1957.[Washington Daily News, July 6, 1957, p. 15] The Yankees swept the Senators in that three-game weekend series. The dissimilarities between Wrigley and Griffith were pointed out by a Washington writer reviewing the film.[Washington Daily News, September 25, 1958, p. 52]

== Remake ==
In 2009, Craig Zadan and Neil Meron attempted to produce a remake for New Line Cinema, with Jim Carrey as the Devil and Jake Gyllenhaal as Joe Boyd. Lola was never cast, and the project has been postponed indefinitely.

== See also ==
- List of American films of 1958
- List of baseball films

== Bibliography ==
- Silverman, Stephen M (1996). Dancing on the ceiling : Stanley Donen and his movies. Knopf. ISBN 9780679414124.
