= Ray Middleton (actor) =

American actor (1907–1984)

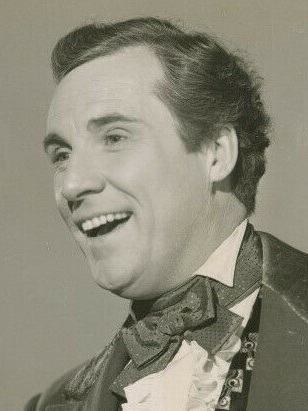
- Middleton in 1952
- Born: February 8, 1907; Chicago, Illinois, U.S.
- Died: April 10, 1984 (aged 77); Panorama City, California, U.S.
- Years active: 1933–1984
- Spouse: Caroline Maye

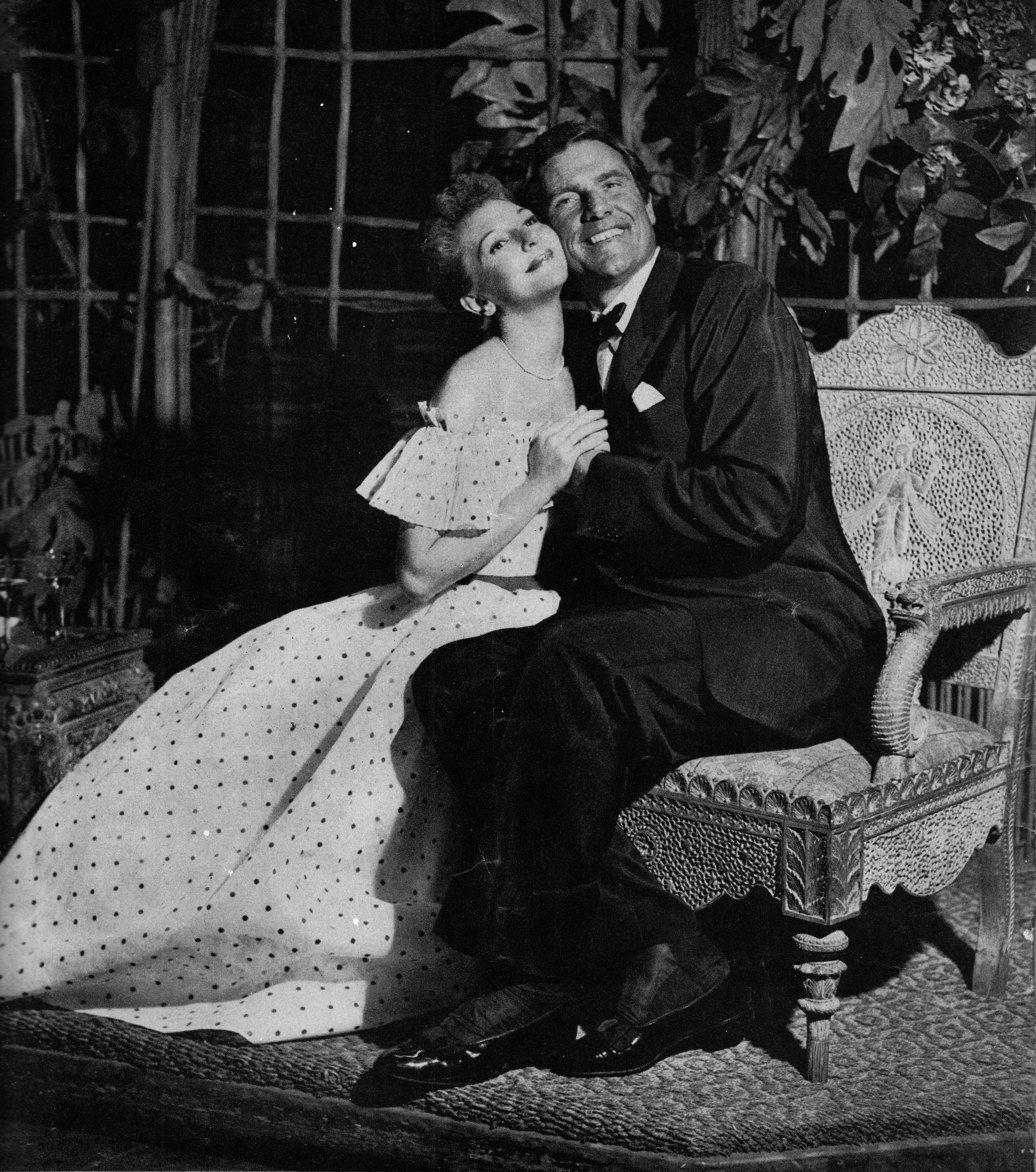
Ray Middleton and Mary Martin in South Pacific (1950)

Raymond Earl Middleton (February 8, 1907 – April 10, 1984) was an American singer and stage, TV and movie actor.

== Early years ==
Middleton was born in Chicago, Illinois, and attended the University of Illinois.

== Career ==
Soon after he graduated from college, Middleton sang with the Detroit Civic Opera Company, after which he sang with the St. Louis Opera Company and the Chicago Civic Opera. He declined to join the Metropolitan Opera Company, preferring a career in film.

In 1933, Middleton appeared in the Broadway play Roberta. Later in 1938, he appeared in the musical Knickerbocker Holiday. During the early 1940s, he appeared in the movies Gangs of Chicago, the original Hurricane Smith (playing the title role), and Lady for a Night, which starred Joan Blondell and John Wayne.

At the New York World's Fair, July 3, 1940 was declared "Superman Day" and Superman was featured at the World of Tomorrow exhibit as the "Man of Tomorrow." At the event, Middleton became the first actor to portray Superman in public.

He served in the U.S. Army Air Forces in World War II, appearing in the Air Forces show Winged Victory.

In 1946, he co-starred with Ethel Merman in the Broadway production of Annie Get Your Gun. In 1948, he starred in Love Life with Nanette Fabray.

In 1950, he co-starred with Mary Martin in South Pacific, succeeding Ezio Pinza. In 1965, he played the innkeeper in Man of La Mancha.

In television, Middleton's appearances included The Ed Sullivan Show, once as a guest host; the Colgate Comedy Hour; and Chrysler's Shower of Stars in the 1950s. He co-starred with Phil Silvers and Lee Remick in a 1967 TV adaptation of Damn Yankees!

During the 1970s, Middleton appeared in the TV movie Hec Ramsey as a judge, in the musical movie 1776, as Colonel Thomas McKean, and in the first TV adaptation of Helter Skelter as ranch-owner George Spahn. He also voiced the character Pepperino in the cartoon Tubby the Tuba.

Middleton's last appearances were as Cardinal Reardon in an episode of M*A*S*H entitled "Blood Brothers," featuring Patrick Swayze; and as grandfather Huey Rush in the comedy Too Close for Comfort.

== Filmography ==
=== Film ===
Year	Title	Role	Notes
1938	You and Me	Salesman	Uncredited
1940	Gangs of Chicago	Bill Whitaker	
1941	Lady from Louisiana	Blackburn 'Blackie' Williams	
1941	Hurricane Smith	'Hurricane' Smith	
1941	Mercy Island	Warren Ramsey	
1942	Lady for a Night	Alan Alderson	
1942	The Girl from Alaska	Steve Bently	
1952	I Dream of Jeanie	Edwin P. Christy	
1953	Sweethearts On Parade	Cameron "Cam" Ellerby	
1954	Jubilee Trail	Charles Hale	
1955	I Cover the Underworld	Police Chief Corbett	
1955	The Road to Denver	John Sutton	
1972	1776	Col. Thomas McKean	
1975	Tubby the Tuba	The Great Pepperino	Voice

=== Television ===
Year	Title	Role	Notes
1954	The Jackie Gleason Show	J.J. Marshall	2 episodes, uncredited
1954	The Colgate Comedy Hour	Carlos, the Miller	adaptation of Revenge with Music
1954	The Best of Broadway	Nick Bullett	adaptation of Cole Porter's Panama Hattie
1955	Shower of Stars	Fred/Ghost of Christmas Present	2 adaptations of A Christmas Carol
1967	Damn Yankees!	Joe Boyd	TV movie
1967	Coronet Blue	Chief Loomis	episode "The Rebels"
1972	Hec Ramsey	Judge Leroy Tate	pilot episode
1972	Ironside	Judge	episode "Buddy, Can You Spare a Life?"
1975	S.W.A.T.	Gregory Kenyon	episode "Strike Force"
1976	Helter Skelter	George Spahn	TV movie
1977	Charlie's Angels	Hal Jardine	episode "I Will Be Remembered"
1981	M*A*S*H	Cardinal James Reardon	episode "Blood Brothers"
1981	Border Pals	Old John	TV movie
1984	Too Close for Comfort	Huey Rush	4 episodes
