= Douglass Wallop =

American writer (1920–1985)

- Born: John Douglass Wallop III; March 8, 1920; Washington, D.C., U.S.
- Died: April 1, 1985 (aged 65); Washington, D.C., U.S.
- Education: University of Notre Dame, University of Maryland, College Park
- Occupation: Writer
- Spouse: Lucille Fletcher (m. 1949)
- Children: 2
- Writing career
- Notable work: The Year the Yankees Lost the Pennant

John Douglass Wallop III (March 8, 1920 – April 1, 1985) was an American novelist and playwright, best known for The Year the Yankees Lost the Pennant (1954), which was adapted into the Tony Award-winning musical Damn Yankees.

== Early life ==
John Douglass Wallop III was born on March 8, 1920, in Washington, D.C., to Marjorie (née Ellis) and John Douglass Wallop Jr., an insurance executive. He attended the University of Notre Dame and graduated from the University of Maryland, College Park, in 1942.

== Career ==
During World War II, Wallop worked for UPI in Washington, D.C. Skilled in stenography and shorthand, he worked in 1948 as a secretary for Dwight D. Eisenhower while Eisenhower wrote Crusade in Europe. He moved to New York City, where he worked for the Associated Press and NBC's radio network.

His first novel, 1953's Night Light, concerns a father's search into the background of his child's murderer. Anne Brooks of the New York Herald Tribune Book Review wrote that he "created characters who are both real and colorful, and he has delved into a maniac's mind with considerable understanding." R.G. Peck's review for the Chicago Sunday Tribune observed that it was a "first novel that's well constructed, carefully written, and free of painful mannerisms." Al Hine of the Saturday Review described it as a "novel that is moving and tautly interesting from the first page to last. Mr. Wallop writes fluently and without affectation, even when he is exploring the subcellars of bop."

Wallop's most famous book, The Year the Yankees Lost the Pennant, the story of a long-suffering Washington Senators fan who sells his soul to the Devil in return for an American League championship for the Senators, came out the next year. The idea came to Wallop as a brainstorm and only required three months to write, as opposed to the four years he had spent on Night Light.

The novel was widely praised: the New York Times described it as "the best use of the legend of the man who sold his soul to the devil since Thomas Mann, and the best baseball story since Ring Lardner." It was adapted by Wallop and George Abbott into an even more popular Tony Award-winning musical Damn Yankees that ran for 1,019 performances on Broadway before being made into a film in 1958.

For Wallop this success was a mixed blessing: he had always wanted to be a "serious writer," but now he was a celebrity invited to deliver insights as an after-dinner speaker at baseball banquets and asked when he was going to write another book like The Year the Yankees Lost the Pennant. According to Wallop, his wife, also a successful author, began to suspect that he had also sold his soul to the Devil; Wallop confessed that "I began to think that I was hearing [his] voice. 'In a couple of weeks or so,' he'd say, 'you can go back to the life of a writer, but it's such a humdrum, boring life that I personally don't see how you can stand it.'"

Wallop went on to write 12 other works, including The Good Life, which was the basis for a television show starring Larry Hagman and Donna Mills, and Baseball, An Informal History, described by one reviewer as "the most underrated baseball book of all time."

== Awards ==
- 1956 Tony Award Damn Yankees
- Book of the Month Club
  - The Year the Yankees Lost the Pennant
  - The Good Life
- Reader's Digest Condensed Books
  - The Year the Yankees Lost the Pennant
  - So This Is What Happened to Charlie Moe

== Personal life ==
Wallop was, like Joe Boyd of The Year the Yankees Lost the Pennant, a lifelong fan of the Washington Senators. He may have modeled Joe Boyd's and Joe Hardy's characters on Joe Judge, a star of the Senators from more than twenty years earlier, whose daughter Wallop dated in the 1940s.

Wallop married author Lucille Fletcher, who had written Sorry, Wrong Number, in 1949. He had two daughters, Dorothy Louise and Wendy Elizabeth. He and Lucille lived in Arlington, Virginia for a time, then moved to Oxford, Maryland on the Eastern Shore in 1963.

Wallop died on April 2, 1985, aged 65, at a hospital in Washington, D.C.

== Bibliography ==
=== Novels ===
- Night Light (1953)
- The Year the Yankees Lost the Pennant (also published as Damn Yankees) (1954)
- The Sunken Garden (also published as The Dangerous Years) (1956)
- What Has Four Wheels and Flies? A Tale (1959)
- Ocean Front (1963)
- So This Is What Happened to Charlie Moe (1965)
- The Mermaid in the Swimming Pool (1968)
- The Good Life (1969)
- Baseball, An Informal History (1969)
- Stone (1971)
- Howard's Bag (1973)
- Mixed Singles (1977)
- Regatta (1981)
- The Other Side of the River (1984)

=== Plays ===
- Damn Yankees (musical, with George Abbott) (1955)

=== Nonfiction ===
- Baseball: An Informal History (1969)
