= Damn Yankees =

Musical play

- 1955 original cast recording
- Music: Richard Adler & Jerry Ross
- Lyrics: Richard Adler & Jerry Ross
- Book: George Abbott; Douglass Wallop
- Basis: The Year the Yankees Lost the Pennant by Douglass Wallop
- Productions: 1955 Broadway; 1957 West End; 1958 film 1967 U.S. television 1994 Broadway revival 1997 West End revival 2008 Encores! Summer Stars; 2017 Off-Broadway; 2025 Washington, D.C.
- Awards: Tony Award for Best Musical

Damn Yankees is a 1955 musical comedy with a book by George Abbott and Douglass Wallop, and music and lyrics by Richard Adler and Jerry Ross. The story is a modern retelling of the Faust legend set during the 1950s in Washington, D.C., during a time when the New York Yankees dominated Major League Baseball. It is based on Wallop's 1954 novel The Year the Yankees Lost the Pennant.

The show ran for 1,019 performances in its original Broadway production. Adler and Ross's success with it and The Pajama Game seemed to point to a bright future for them, but Ross suddenly died of chronic bronchiectasis at age 29, several months after Damn Yankees opened.

== Plot ==
Note: The synopsis for the 1994 Broadway revival differed from the original 1955 production. The plot of the 1958 film adaptation is closer to the original stage version.

Middle-aged real estate agent Joe Boyd is a long-suffering fan of the pathetic Washington Senators baseball team. His wife Meg laments this ("Six Months Out Of Every Year"). After she has gone to bed, he sits up late, grumbling that if the Senators just had a "long ball hitter" they could beat "those damn Yankees". Suddenly, the smooth-talking, subtly demonic Mr. Applegate appears. He offers Joe the chance to become "Joe Hardy", the young slugger the Senators need. He accepts, even though he must leave Meg ("Goodbye Old Girl"). However, his business sense makes him insist on an escape clause. The Senators' last game is on September 25, and if he plays in it, he is to stay as Joe Hardy forever. If not, he has until 9:00 the night before to walk away from the deal and return to his normal life.

At the ballpark, the hapless Senators vow to play their best despite their failings ("Heart"). Then Joe Hardy is suddenly discovered and joins the team. Gloria Thorpe, a sports reporter, praises him ("Shoeless Joe from Hannibal, Mo"). His hitting prowess enables the team to move up in the standings.

Though Joe is increasingly successful, he truly misses Meg and moves into her house as a boarder in his Joe Hardy persona. They begin to bond, especially over her "lost" husband ("A Man Doesn't Know"). Fearful of losing his deal, Applegate calls Lola, "the best homewrecker on [his] staff", to seduce Joe and ensure he loses the bet. She promises to deliver ("A Little Brains, A Little Talent"), and Applegate introduces her as a sultry South American dancer named "Señorita Lolita Banana". She sings a seductive song ("Whatever Lola Wants"), but Joe's devotion to Meg proves too strong, even for her. Applegate punishes her by firing her, where she performs with other past workers for Applegate ("Who's Got the Pain").

Applegate decides to switch tactics to ensure Joe's failure. He releases false information about Joe's true identity being "Shifty McCoy", an escaped criminal and con artist. When Gloria discovers this information, she presses charges, and he is forced into court.

The Senators prepare for the final game against the Yankees for the pennant and worry about Joe, but they vow to think of nothing but winning ("The Game"). Meanwhile, angry fans are seeking him out, so he decides to leave home. As he does so, he hints to Meg that her old husband is nearby ("Near to You"). Meanwhile, Applegate is exhausted by the work he has put into winning one bet and recalls the "simpler" times in his long history ("Those Were the Good Old Days").

Joe's trial is held on September 24, the last day he can back out of his deal. As he technically does not exist, he cannot produce any kind of identification. The owner of the Senators, their coach, and even Lola (disguised as "Señora McCoy") testify, but their opinions carry no weight. Gloria suggests that Applegate take the stand, but he is unable to take the oath since it requires him to tell the truth. Joe realizes that Applegate is simply stalling to keep him from meeting his 9:00 deadline. Applegate claims that Joe "just needs time to think" and sends him to where Lola is, where history's most famous lovers wait. Lola meets him there and realizes that he truly loves Meg. She helps him by sending him into the final game and delays Applegate by coercing him into a duet ("Two Lost Souls").

When Applegate finally arrives at the game, it is 8:55, and Joe is at bat. As time runs out, Meg, her friends, and even Lola begin cheering for him. Applegate uses his powers to give Joe two strikes. The clock strikes nine, and Applegate claims victory, but at the last second, Joe cries, "Let me go!" The deal is broken, and he reverts to his old self but is still able to hit a home run, winning the pennant for the Senators.

Back at home, Joe rushes into Meg's arms. Applegate appears on the scene, claiming that Joe owes him his prize. Joe begs Meg to hold him and not let go, and she begins to sing ("Finale (A Man Doesn't Know)"). Applegate promises to make him young again and even ensure a World Series victory. But his powers are useless against their true love, as Lola points out. Applegate and Lola return to where they came from, defeated, with Joe and Meg reunited.

=== 2025 Revisions ===
The 2025 Arena Stage production introduces a revised book from Will Power and Doug Wright. The update changes the setting and team from the Senators to the 2000 Baltimore Orioles, and there are several references to the culture of Baltimore. Additionally, Joe's motivations are expanded by his father having been a player in the Negro leagues. The plot point of Joe being framed as a con artist is changed to him being implicated by Applegate in a doping scandal, and the trial is replaced by a meeting with the commissioner of baseball, where it is revealed that Joe has passed a test for performance-enhancing drugs. Joe is tricked by Applegate into missing the deadline, but he prevails nonetheless through the power of his love for his wife.

== Characters ==
- Joe Boyd — A middle-aged, overweight married man who is in love with baseball, especially the Senators [the "older" Joe Hardy]
- Joe Hardy — The 22-year-old, home-run-hitting transformation of Joe Boyd
- Meg Boyd — Joe's loyal, traditional wife
- Lola — The Devil's seductress assistant
- Mr. Applegate — The Devil in disguise as a slick salesman
- Van Buren — The hard working manager of the Senators with great heart but no luck
- Gloria Thorpe — A probing reporter
- Rocky — A baseball player for the Senators
- Smokey — A "dim bulb" catcher for the Senators
- Cherry — A friend of Meg
- Doris — A friend of Meg
- Sister — A friend of Meg
- Mr. Welch — The owner of the Senators
- Others: Bouley (also called Ibsen in some productions), Vernon, Henry, Linville, Sohovik, Lowe, Mickey, Del, Miss Weston, Postmaster and The Commissioner
- Baseball players and batboys; Baseball fans' wives

(The original Broadway version also had a children's chorus who sang the reprise of "Heart")

== Productions ==
=== Original Broadway production ===
The producers Frederick Brisson, Robert E. Griffith and Harold S. Prince had decided that the lead actress for the part of "Lola" had to be a dancer. They offered the role to both the movie actress Mitzi Gaynor and ballet dancer Zizi Jeanmaire, each of whom turned down the role. Although Gwen Verdon had sung just one song in her previous show (Can-Can), the producers were willing to take a chance on her. She initially refused, preferring to assist another choreographer, but finally agreed. Choreographer Bob Fosse insisted on meeting her before working with her, and after meeting and working for a brief time, they each agreed to the arrangement. This was the start of an artistic and personal partnership between Fosse and Verdon, who married in 1960.

The show opened on Broadway at the 46th Street Theatre on May 5, 1955, transferred to the Adelphi Theatre on May 17, 1957, and ran for a total of 1,019 performances. It was directed by George Abbott, with scenery and costumes by William and Jean Eckart, dances and musical numbers staged by Fosse, musical direction by Hal Hastings, orchestrations by Don Walker, and dance music arrangements by Roger Adams.

The show starred Ray Walston (Applegate), Verdon (Lola), Shannon Bolin (Meg), Robert Shafer (Joe Boyd), Elizabeth Howell (Doris), Stephen Douglass (Joe Hardy), Al Lanti (Henry), Eddie Phillips (Sohovik), Nathaniel Frey (Smokey), Albert Linville (Vernon, Postmaster), Russ Brown (Van Buren), Jimmy Komack (Rocky), Rae Allen (Gloria), Cherry Davis (Teenager), Del Horstmann (Lynch, Commissioner), Richard Bishop (Welch), Janie Janvier (Miss Weston), and Jean Stapleton (Sister).

=== Original West End production ===
A West End production played at the London Coliseum beginning on March 28, 1957, where it played for 258 performances. It starred Olympic skater Belita (aka Gladys Lyne Jepson-Turner) as Lola, but the Fosse choreography was alien to her style, and she was replaced by Elizabeth Seal. It also starred Bill Kerr as Applegate, and Ivor Emmanuel as Joe Hardy.

In the mid-1970s, Vincent Price starred as Applegate in summer stock productions of the show. In the late 1970s and early 1980s film actor Van Johnson did so in productions throughout the U.S.A. In July, 1981, a production was performed at the Jones Beach Marine Theater in Wantagh, New York. It was notable due to former New York Jets quarterback Joe Namath being cast in the role of Joe Boyd.

=== Broadway revival ===
A Broadway revival opened at the Marquis Theatre on March 3, 1994 and ran for 519 performances and 33 previews. Featured were Jarrod Emick as Joe Hardy, winner of the 1994 Tony Award for Best Featured Actor in a Musical, Bebe Neuwirth as Lola and Victor Garber as Applegate. Garber was succeeded by Jerry Lewis, making his Broadway debut, on March 12, 1995, who then starred in a national tour and also played the role in a London production. Jack O'Brien directed, with choreography by Rob Marshall, assisted by his sister, Kathleen. O'Brien is also credited with revisions to the book.

=== West End revival ===
The 1994 revival production opened in the West End at the Adelphi Theatre on June 4, 1997 (previews started May 29) and closed on August 9, 1997. Jerry Lewis reprised his role as Applegate and April Nixon played Lola.

=== North Shore Music Theatre ===
In 2006, North Shore Music Theatre in Beverly, Massachusetts, presented a revised production with the Washington Senators replaced with the Yankees' traditional rivals, the Boston Red Sox. The revised book was written, with permission, by Joe DiPietro.

=== Reprise! Broadway's Best ===
In 2007, Reprise! Broadway's Best produced a revival. Jason Alexander directed, resetting the show to 1981 Los Angeles and making changes to accommodate a largely African-American and Hispanic cast. It opened November 7, 2007 and ran through November 25.

=== Encores! ===
A revival was produced by the City Center Encores! Summer Stars series from July 5 to July 27, 2008. It starred Jane Krakowski as Lola, Sean Hayes as Applegate, Randy Graff as Meg, Megan Lawrence as Gloria Thorpe (replacing an injured Ana Gasteyer during rehearsal), P. J. Benjamin as Joe Boyd, and Cheyenne Jackson as Joe Hardy. John Rando directed and the original Fosse choreography was reproduced by Mary MacLeod. Given the substantial changes in the 1994 revival, this is considered by some the first authentic revival of the original production.

=== Off-Broadway benefit performance ===
A one-night-only off-Broadway benefit performance was staged by Roundabout Theatre Company. The benefit, which was directed by Kathleen Marshall, occurred on December 11, 2017. It starred Stephen Bogardus as Joe Boyd, Matthew Morrison as Joe Hardy, Victoria Clark as Meg, Maggie Gyllenhaal as Lola, Whoopi Goldberg as a gender-bent Applegate, Danny Burstein as Van Buren, and Adrienne Warren as Gloria. It was produced by Scott Landis, Jerry Frankel, and Jay and Cindy Gutterman.

=== Arena Stage production ===
From 9 September to 9 November 2025, Arena Stage presented a revised production of the show with a new book by Will Power and Doug Wright, and new additional lyrics by Lynn Ahrens. Sergio Trujillo directed and choreographed the production in the round in Arena's Fichandler Theater. The cast was led by Rob McClure as Applegate and Jordan Donica as Joe Hardy, with Ana Villafañe as Lola, Quentin Earl Darrington as Joe Boyd, Bryonha Marie as Meg Boyd, Alysha Umphress as Gloria Thorpe, Nehal Joshi as Van Buren, Keenan McCarter as Welch, Rayanne Gonzales as Sister, and Sarah Anne Sillers as Doris.

The revised production, set during the New York Yankees 2000 championship run, is being helmed by lead producer Haley Swindal, the granddaughter of former Yankees owner George Steinbrenner.

=== Planned 2027 Broadway revival ===
The Arena Stage production will transfer to Broadway and is scheduled to begin previews at the Marquis Theatre on March 24, 2027, with an official opening night on April 20, 2027. The cast for the production is set to include Neil Patrick Harris as Applegate, Julianne Hough as Lola, and Austin Scott as Joe Hardy.

== Musical numbers ==
Based on hand engraved materials originally available from Music Theatre International derived from the 1955 production

Act One

- Overture — Orchestra
- Curtain Act 1 — Orchestra
- Six Months — Meg Boyd, Joe Boyd, Men, and Girls
- Devil Music — Orchestra
- Goodbye Old Girl — Joe Boyd and Joe Hardy
- Heart — Van Buren, Smoky, Rocky, Vernon
- Heart Encore — Van Buren, Smoky, Rocky, Vernon
- Shoeless Joe from Hannibal, Mo. — Gloria Thorpe, Boys, Senators
- Shoeless Joe Dance — Orchestra
- A Man Doesn't Know — Joe Hardy
- Lola — Orchestra
- A Little Talent — Lola
- Goodbye (Reprise) — Orchestra
- A Man Doesn't Know (Reprise) — Joe Hardy, Meg
- Whatever Lola Wants (with Dance Break) — Lola
- Not Meg — Orchestra
- Heart (Reprise) — Men
- Chairs Fanfare — Orchestra
- Who's Got The Pain? (with Double Dance Breaks) — Lola & Men (Street Band)
- Act 1 Finale (New Shoeless Joe Finale) — Orchestra

Act Two

- Entr'Acte — Orchestra
- Opening Act 2 — Orchestra
- The Game — Senators
- Near to You — Joe Hardy and Meg Boyd
- Good Old Days — Applegate
- Days Encore — Applegate
- Courtroom Blackout — Orchestra
- Two Lost Souls (with Dance) — Lola and Joe Hardy
- Devil Music — Orchestra
- Shoeless Joe (Reprise) — Orchestra
- Back Home — Orchestra
- Finale (A Man Doesn't Know) — Meg and Joe Boyd
- Bows (Heart) — Orchestra
- Exit March — Orchestra

Based on 1994 revival

Act One

- Overture
- Six Months Out Of Every Year — Meg Boyd, Joe Boyd, Sister, Gloria Thorpe, Husbands, and Wives
- Goodbye Old Girl — Joe Boyd and Joe Hardy
- Blooper Ballet — The Senators
- Heart — Van Buren, Smokey, Rocky, Linville
- Shoeless Joe from Hannibal, Mo. — Gloria Thorpe, Senators
- Shoeless Joe (Reprise) — Gloria Thorpe, Joe Hardy, and Ensemble (1994 revival only, used elements of the song in the style of retro-1950s commercials)
- A Little Brains, a Little Talent — Lola
- A Man Doesn't Know — Joe Hardy and Meg Boyd
- Whatever Lola Wants — Lola

Act Two

- Who's Got the Pain? — Lola and Senators (Originally, this came at the end of Act One, as "The Game" started Act Two)
- The Game — Rocky, Smokey, and Senators
- Near to You — Joe Hardy and Meg Boyd (1994 IBDB shows the addition of Joe Boyd)
- Those Were the Good Old Days — Applegate
- Two Lost Souls — Lola and Applegate (1994 IBDB shows Applegate, 1955 IBDB shows Hardy)
- A Man Doesn't Know (Reprise) — Meg and Joe Boyd

== Notable casts and characters ==
Character	Original Broadway 1955	Original West End 1957	Toronto 1988	Broadway Revival 1994	West End Revival 1997	Encores! 2008	Broadway Concert 2017	Washington, D.C. 2025
Joe Boyd	Robert Shafer	Phil Vickers	James Hobson	Dennis Kelly	Dennis Kelly	P. J. Benjamin	Stephen Bogardus	Quentin Earl Darrington
Joe Hardy	Stephen Douglass	Ivor Emmanuel	Davis Gaines	Jarrod Emick	John-Michael Flate	Cheyenne Jackson	Matthew Morrison	Jordan Donica
Meg Boyd	Shannon Bolin	Betty Paul	Maida Rogerson	Linda Stephens	Joy Franz	Randy Graff	Victoria Clark	Bryonha Marie
Lola	Gwen Verdon	Belita (Note: She was replaced by Elizabeth Seal because Fosse's choreography was too new of a style to her)	Moira Walley-Beckett	Bebe Neuwirth	April Nixon	Jane Krakowski	Maggie Gyllenhaal	Ana Villafañe
Mr. Applegate	Ray Walston	Bill Kerr	Avery Saltzman	Victor Garber	Jerry Lewis	Sean Hayes	Whoopi Goldberg	Rob McClure
Van Buren	Russ Brown	Donald Stewart	Michael Fawkes	Dick Latessa	Richie Mastascusa	Michael Mulheren	Danny Burstein	Nehal Joshi
Gloria Thorpe	Rae Allen	Judy Bruce	Pamela Gerrand	Vicki Lewis	Ellen Grosso	Megan Lawrence	Adrienne Warren	Alysha Umphress

=== Original Broadway replacements ===
- Meg Boyd: Charlotte Fairchild
- Lola: Sheila Bond, Gretchen Wyler, Devra Korwin
- Applegate: Howard Caine
- Gloria: Sally Brown

=== Original West End replacements ===
- Applegate: Vincent Price, Van Johnson

=== Broadway revival replacements ===
- Joe Hardy: Eric Kunze, Jason Workman
- Lola: Charlotte d'Amboise
- Applegate: Jerry Lewis
- Gloria: Liz Larsen

== Recordings, film, and television ==
The original Broadway cast recording on RCA Victor was recorded at New York's Webster Hall on May 8, 1955. The original mono LP was pressed and available for retail sale in NYC the following afternoon—perhaps a still-standing record. RCA released an electronic-stereo LP in 1965, and subsequently had a CD release in 1988. RCA Victor also released a mono version of the film soundtrack in 1958, with the 1989 CD marking the first release of the stereo soundtrack recording. The Broadway revival cast recording by Mercury (now the Decca Broadway label) was first released May 17, 1994.

The 1958 film adaptation directed by George Abbott and Stanley Donen largely featured the Broadway principals in their stage roles, with the exception of Tab Hunter as Joe Hardy (replacing Stephen Douglass).

A made-for-TV movie was broadcast April 8, 1967, on NBC, with Phil Silvers as Applegate, Lee Remick as Lola, and Ray Middleton as Joe Boyd.

Ray Walston expressed interest recreating Applegate in Raisin' Cane, a 1980 musical by Ted Kopulos, where Applegate's ploy ages a young girl, lands her the lead in a Broadway show, scheming to change her back and bankrupt all the investors.

A contemporary film adaptation of the musical was announced in 2009, with Jim Carrey as Applegate and Jake Gyllenhaal as Joe Hardy, though the project failed to develop.

== Awards and nominations ==
=== Original Broadway production ===
Year	Award	Category	Nominee	Result
1956	Tony Award	Best Musical		Won
1956	Tony Award	Best Performance By a Leading Actor in a Musical	Ray Walston	Won
1956	Tony Award	Best Performance By a Leading Actor in a Musical	Stephen Douglass	Nominated
1956	Tony Award	Best Performance by a Leading Actress in a Musical	Gwen Verdon	Won
1956	Tony Award	Best Performance by a Featured Actor in a Musical	Russ Brown	Won
1956	Tony Award	Best Performance by a Featured Actress in a Musical	Rae Allen	Nominated
1956	Tony Award	Best Conductor and Musical Director	Hal Hastings	Won
1956	Tony Award	Best Choreography	Bob Fosse	Won
1956	Tony Award	Best Stage Technician	Harry Green	Won

=== 1994 Broadway revival ===
Year	Award	Category	Nominee	Result
1994	Tony Award	Best Revival of a Musical		Nominated
1994	Tony Award	Best Performance by a Leading Actor in a Musical	Victor Garber	Nominated
1994	Tony Award	Best Performance by a Featured Actor in a Musical	Jarrod Emick	Won
1994	Tony Award	Best Choreography	Rob Marshall	Nominated
1994	Drama Desk Award	Outstanding Revival of a Musical		Nominated
1994	Drama Desk Award	Outstanding Featured Actor in a Musical	Jarrod Emick	Won
1994	Drama Desk Award	Outstanding Orchestrations	Douglas Besterman	Nominated
1994	Theatre World Award		Jarrod Emick	Won

=== 1997 London revival ===
Year	Award	Category	Nominee	Result
1998	Laurence Olivier Award	Laurence Olivier Award for Outstanding Musical Production		Nominated
1998	Laurence Olivier Award	Best Performance in a Supporting Role in a Musical	April Nixon	Nominated
1998	Laurence Olivier Award	Best Theatre Choreographer	Rob Marshall	Nominated
