= Gwen Verdon =

American actress and dancer (1925–2000)

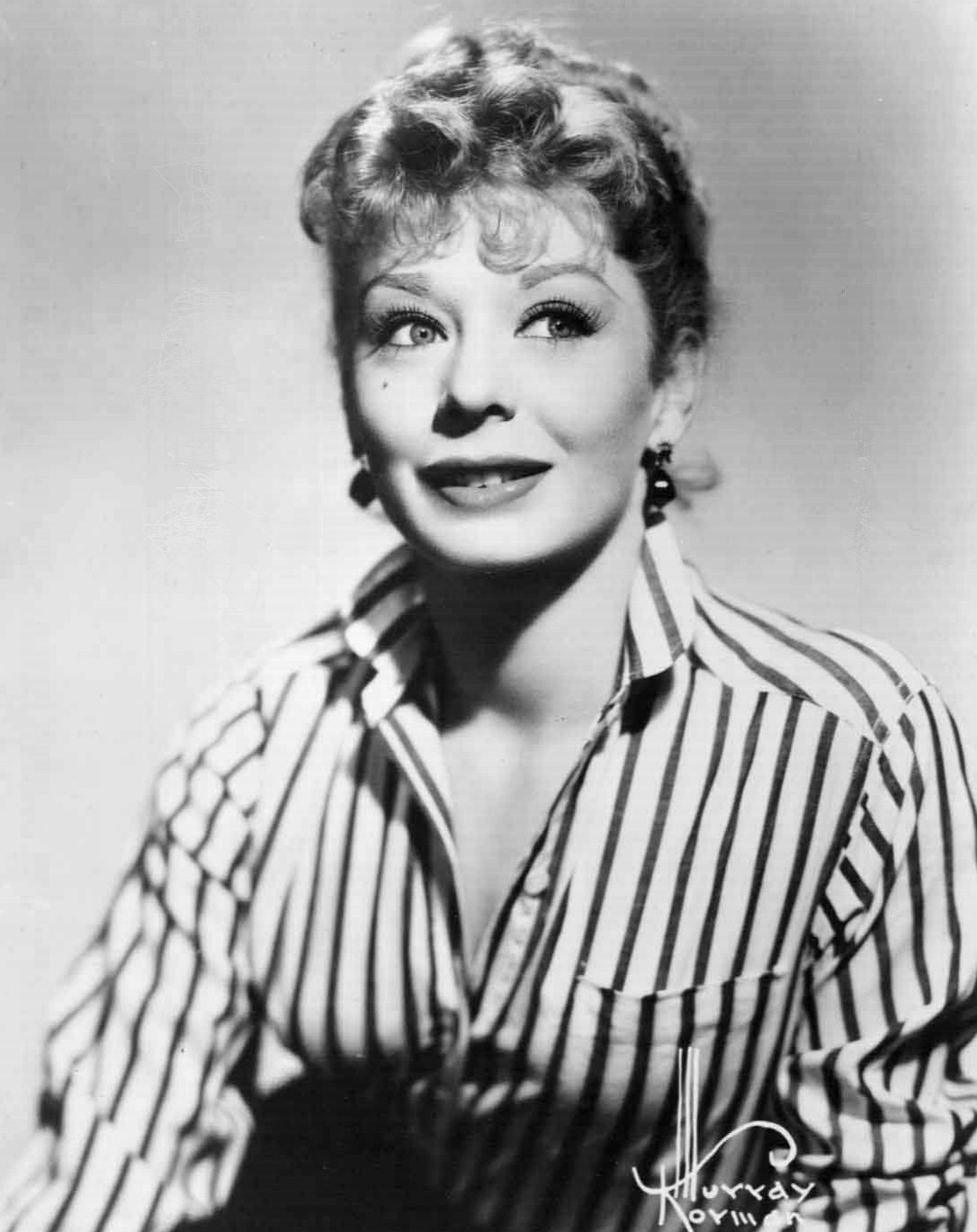
- Verdon in 1954
- Born: Gwyneth Evelyn Verdon; January 13, 1925; Culver City, California, U.S.
- Died: October 18, 2000 (aged 75); Woodstock, Vermont, U.S.
- Occupations: Actress, dancer, choreographer
- Years active: 1936–2000
- Spouses: James Henaghan (m. 1942; div. 1947); Bob Fosse (m. 1960; died 1987)
- Children: 2, including Nicole Fosse

Gwyneth Evelyn "Gwen" Verdon (January 13, 1925 – October 18, 2000) was an American actress and dancer. She won four Tony Awards for her musical comedy performances, and she served as an uncredited choreographer's assistant and specialty dance coach for theater and film. Verdon was a critically acclaimed performer on Broadway in the 1950s, 1960s, and 1970s, having originated many roles in musicals, including Lola in Damn Yankees, the title character in Sweet Charity, and Roxie Hart in Chicago.

Her second husband was director-choreographer Bob Fosse, with whom she worked on a number of theater and film projects. After Fosse's death, she worked to preserve his legacy.

== Early life ==
Verdon was born in Culver City, California, the second child of Gertrude Lilian (née Standring) and Joseph William Verdon, who were both English immigrants to the United States by way of Canada. Her brother was William Farrell Verdon, her father was an electrician at MGM Studios, and her mother was a former vaudevillian of the Denishawn dance troupe, as well as a dance teacher.

As a toddler, she suffered from rickets, which led to her being called "Gimpy" by other children and spent her early years in orthopedic boots and rigid leg braces. At age three, her mother enrolled her in dance classes. Further ballet training strengthened her legs and improved her carriage.

By age six, she was dancing on stage. She went on to study multiple dance forms, ranging from tap, jazz, ballroom and flamenco to Balinese. She also studied juggling. At age 11, she appeared as a solo ballerina in the musical romance film The King Steps Out (1936), directed by Josef von Sternberg and starring Grace Moore and Franchot Tone. She attended Hamilton High School in Los Angeles and studied under ballet enthusiast Ernest Belcher. While in high school, she was cast in a revival of Show Boat.

In 1942, Verdon's parents asked her to marry family friend and tabloid reporter James Henaghan after he got her pregnant at 17 years old, and she quit dancing to raise their child. In 1945, she appeared as a dancer in the movie musical Blonde From Brooklyn. After her divorce, she entrusted her son Jimmy to the care of her parents.

== Career ==
Early on, Verdon found a job as assistant to choreographer Jack Cole, whose work was respected by both Broadway and Hollywood movie studios. During her five-year employment with Cole, she took small roles in movie musicals as a "specialty dancer". She also taught dance to stars such as Jane Russell, Fernando Lamas, Lana Turner, Rita Hayworth, Betty Grable, and Marilyn Monroe.

Verdon started out on Broadway going from one chorus line to another. Her breakthrough role finally came when choreographer Michael Kidd cast her as the second female lead in Cole Porter's musical Can-Can (1953), starring French prima donna Lilo. Out-of-town reviewers hailed Verdon's interpretation of Eve in the Garden of Eden ballet as a performance that upstaged the show's star, who reputedly demanded Verdon's role be cut to only two featured dance numbers. With her role reduced to little more than an ensemble part, Verdon formally announced her intention to quit by the time the show premiered on Broadway. But her opening-night Garden of Eden performance was so well-received that the audience screamed her name until the startled actress was brought from her dressing room in a towel to take a curtain call. Verdon received a pay increase and her first Tony Award for her performance.

Verdon's biggest critical and commercial success was her following show, George Abbott's Damn Yankees (1955), based on the novel The Year the Yankees Lost the Pennant. The musical ran for 1,019 performances. Verdon won another Tony and went to Hollywood to repeat her role in the 1958 movie version Damn Yankees, singing "Whatever Lola Wants". Fosse can be seen partnered with her in the original mambo duet "Who's Got the Pain".

Verdon won another Tony for her performance in the musical New Girl in Town as a hard-luck girl fleeing from her past as a prostitute. She won her fourth Tony for the murder-mystery musical Redhead, Fosse's Broadway debut as a director/choreographer. In 1960, Fosse and Verdon wed.

In 1966, Verdon returned to the stage in the role of Charity in Sweet Charity, which, like many of her earlier Broadway triumphs, was choreographed and directed by husband Fosse. The show is loosely based on Federico Fellini's screenplay for Nights of Cabiria. It was followed by a movie version starring Shirley MacLaine as Charity, featuring Ricardo Montalbán, Sammy Davis Jr. and Chita Rivera, with Fosse at the helm of his first film as director and choreographer. Verdon helped with the choreography. The numbers include the famed "Big Spender", "Rhythm of Life", "If My Friends Could See Me Now", and "I'm a Brass Band". Verdon also traveled to Berlin to help Fosse with Cabaret, the musical film for which he won an Oscar for Best Director.

Although estranged as a couple, Verdon continued to collaborate with Fosse as a performer and a choreographer. In the 1975 Broadway production of the Fosse-directed musical Chicago, Verdon originated the role of murderess Roxie Hart opposite Chita Rivera's Velma Kelly. Although the musical was almost universally panned by critics, who compared it unfavorably to Cabaret, Gwen Verdon was singled out for praise: her performance was "delectable" wrote the NY Times theater critic. Verdon also helped out with Fosse's paean to Broadway dancing in the musical Dancin' (1978), as well as Fosse's autobiographical film All That Jazz (1979). The helpmate/peer played by Leland Palmer in that film is based on the role Verdon played in Fosse's real life. She also developed a close working relationship with Fosse's romantic partner of six years, Broadway dancer Ann Reinking, working as an instructor for Reinking's musical theatre classes.

After the 1975 stage version of Chicago Verdon focused on film acting, playing character roles in movies such as The Cotton Club (1984), Cocoon (1985), and Cocoon: The Return (1988). She collected several Emmy nominations in her guest performances on television shows, including nominations for appearances on Magnum, P.I. (1988), Dream On (1993) and Homicide: Life on the Street (1993). Her screen roles continued in prestigious films, such as the mother of Mia Farrow's title character in the Woody Allen movie Alice (1990) and the eccentric Aunt Ruth (a turn which earned her a Screen Actors Guild Award nomination) in Marvin's Room (1996), co-starring Meryl Streep, Diane Keaton, and Leonardo DiCaprio. Other film roles include Alora in Walking Across Egypt (1999) and Bruno (2000).

Verdon served as artistic consultant to the 1999 Broadway musical Fosse, reprising classic Fosse choreography without any formal narrative; the revue was conceived and co-directed by Richard Maltby Jr. and Ann Reinking. (Verdon's daughter with Fosse, performer Nicole Fosse received a "special thanks" credit.) With glowing reviews, Fosse ran for 1000 performances on Broadway and collected four Tonys, including the Tony Award for Best Musical.

== Personal life ==
Verdon was married twice and had two children. She married tabloid reporter James Archibald Henaghan in 1942. They had a son, Jim, the following year and divorced in 1947. In 1960, Verdon married choreographer Bob Fosse. They had a daughter, Nicole, in 1963. Fosse's extramarital affairs put a strain on their marriage, and by 1971, Verdon and Fosse were separated, but never divorced. She was involved in relationships with actor Scott Brady and actor Jerry Lanning, son of Roberta Sherwood. Verdon was with Fosse when he suffered a fatal heart attack at the Willard Hotel in Washington, D.C., in September 1987.

Verdon was a cat fancier, having up to six cats at one time, with the pets carrying names such as "Feets Fosse", "Junie Moon", and "Tidbits Tumbler Fosse".

Verdon was a mental health-care advocate; later in life, she openly spoke about the positive effects of mental-health counseling. Along with teaching dance as a form of therapy, she sat on the board of directors for the New York Postgraduate Center for Mental Health, and actively raised funds to support mental health-care research.

She was also stated to be a big fan of baseball, and went to day games with her scout son.

== Death and legacy ==
Verdon died from a heart attack on October 18, 2000, aged 75, at her daughter's home in Woodstock, Vermont. Later that night, at 8 pm, all marquee lights on Broadway were dimmed in a tribute to Verdon.

== Popular culture ==
Fosse/Verdon is an 8-part American miniseries starring Sam Rockwell as Fosse and Michelle Williams as Verdon. The series, which tells the story of the couple's troubled personal and professional relationship, is based on the biography Fosse by Sam Wasson. It premiered in eight parts on April 9, 2019, on FX. At the 71st Primetime Emmy Awards, Fosse/Verdon received seventeen nominations, including Outstanding Limited Series and acting nominations for Rockwell, Williams, and Margaret Qualley (as Ann Reinking). Williams won the Primetime Emmy Award for Outstanding Lead Actress in a Limited Series or Movie.

== Work ==
=== Stage ===
| Year | Title | Role | Notes |
|---|---|---|---|
| 1950 | Alive and Kicking | Herself | Musical revue |
| 1953 | Can-Can | Claudine/Eve | Grammy Award for Best Broadway Show Album; Tony Award for Distinguished Supporting or Featured Musical Actress |
| 1955 | Damn Yankees | Lola | Tony Award for Best Leading Actress in a Musical |
| 1957 | New Girl in Town | Anna | Tony Award for Best Leading Actress in a Musical |
| 1959 | Redhead | Essie Whimple | Tony Award for Best Leading Actress in a Musical |
| 1966 | Sweet Charity | Charity Hope Valentine | Nominated–Tony Award for Best Leading Actress in a Musical |
| 1972 | Children! Children! | Helen Giles | Only played one performance (13 previews) |
| 1975 | Chicago | Roxie Hart | Nominated–Tony Award for Best Leading Actress in a Musical |

=== Film ===
| Year | Title | Role | Notes |
|---|---|---|---|
| 1936 | The King Steps Out | Specialty Ballerina | Uncredited |
| 1941 | The Girl After My Heart | Specialty Ballerina | Credited as "Gwen Verdun" [sic] a Soundie by Roy Mack |
| 1943 | Hoosier Holiday | Cheerleader | Uncredited |
| 1945 | Blonde from Brooklyn | Girl in Nightclub | Uncredited |
| 1951 | On the Riviera | Specialty Dancer | Uncredited |
| 1951 | David and Bathsheba | Specialty Dancer | Uncredited |
| 1951 | Meet Me After the Show | Sappho and Co-lead dancer in the show finale, a street kid | Uncredited prominent dancer in "No Talent Joe" Credited in a program title card in "I Feel Like Dancing" |
| 1952 | Dreamboat | Girl in perfume commercial | Uncredited |
| 1952 | The Merry Widow | Specialty Can-Can Dancer | Uncredited |
| 1953 | The I Don't Care Girl | Specialty Dancer | Uncredited |
| 1953 | The Mississippi Gambler | Voodoo Dancer | Uncredited |
| 1953 | The Farmer Takes a Wife | Abigail | Uncredited |
| 1955 | Gentlemen Marry Brunettes | Specialty Dancer | Uncredited |
| 1958 | Damn Yankees | Lola | Nominated—BAFTA Award for Most Promising Newcomer to Film |
| 1978 | Sgt. Pepper's Lonely Hearts Club Band | Our Guests at Heartland | |
| 1982 | Creepshow | Voice of Lenora Castonmeyer | Uncredited |
| 1984 | The Cotton Club | Tish Dwyer | |
| 1985 | Cocoon | Bess McCarthy | Nominated—Saturn Award for Best Supporting Actress |
| 1987 | Nadine | Vera | |
| 1988 | Cocoon: The Return | Bess McCarthy Selwyn | |
| 1990 | Alice | Alice's mother | |
| 1994 | Oldest Living Confederate Widow Tells All | Etta Pell, Nursing Home Resident | |
| 1996 | Marvin's Room | Ruth Wakefield | Nominated—Screen Actors Guild Award for Outstanding Performance by a Female Actor in a Supporting Role; Nominated—Screen Actors Guild Award for Outstanding Performance by a Cast in a Motion Picture |
| 1999 | Walking Across Egypt | Alora | |
| 2000 | Bruno | Mrs. Drago | |

=== Television ===
| Year | Title | Role | Notes |
|---|---|---|---|
| 1954 | Goodyear Playhouse | Shirley Kochendorfer | Episode: "Native Dancer" |
| 1972 | Love, American Style | Estelle Mayberry | Segment: "Love and the New Act" |
| 1973 | The $10,000 Pyramid | Celebrity Guest | Week of October 22–26, playing against Godfrey Cambridge |
| 1981 | M*A*S*H | Brandy Doyle (USO performer) | Episodes: "That's Show Biz" (two episodes, Parts 1 and 2) |
| 1982 | Fame | Melinda MacNeil | Episode: "Come One, Come All" |
| 1982 | All My Children | Judith Kingsley Sawyer | Unknown episodes |
| 1983 | Legs | Maureen Comly | Television movie |
| 1984 | The Jerk, Too | Bag Lady | Television movie; uncredited |
| 1984 | Gimme a Break! | Lily | Episode: "The Center" |
| 1985 | Trapper John, M.D. | Ms. Taylor | Episode: "All the King's Horses" |
| 1985 | Kids Incorporated | Ruth | Episode: "Grandma, Won't You Dance with Me" |
| 1985–1988 | Magnum, P.I. | Katherine Peterson | 5 episodes Nominated—Primetime Emmy Award for Outstanding Guest Performer in a Drama Series (1988) |
| 1986 | The Equalizer | Kelly Sterling | Episode: "Unnatural Causes" |
| 1986 | All Is Forgiven | Bonita Harrell | Episode: "I Can't Say No" |
| 1986–1988 | Webster | Aunt Charlotte | 3 episodes |
| 1987 | Hotel | Iris Lloyd | Episode: "Second Thoughts" |
| 1989 | Dear John | Yvonne | Episode: "The Second Time Around" |
| 1990 | Paris is Burning | Herself | Uncredited |
| 1992 | Dream On | Kitty Brewer | Episode: "For Peter's Sake"; Nominated—Primetime Emmy Award for Outstanding Guest Actress in a Comedy Series (1993) |
| 1993 | Homicide: Life on the Street | Jessie Doohen | Episode: "Ghost of a Chance"; Nominated—Primetime Emmy Award for Outstanding Guest Actress in a Drama Series (1993) |
| 1993 | Key West | Sister Grace | Episode: "Gimme Shelter" |
| 1994 | The Cosby Mysteries | Yolanda | 2 episodes |
| 1996 | In Cold Blood | Sadie Truitt | 2 episodes |
| 1997 | Touched by an Angel | Lorraine McCully | Episode: "Missing in Action" |
| 1997–1999 | Walker, Texas Ranger | Maisie Whitman | 2 episodes |
| 1998 | Promised Land | Karen Hatcher | Episode: "Undercover Granny" |

=== Music ===
- In 1956, Verdon released an album titled The Girl I Left Home For. The album includes her covers of popular jazz standards of the time.

== Awards and nominations ==
| Year | Award | Category | Nominated work | Result | Ref. |
|---|---|---|---|---|---|
| 1981 | American Theater Hall of Fame | —N/a | —N/a | Inducted | |
| 1958 | British Academy Film Awards | Most Promising Newcomer to Film | Damn Yankees | Nominated | |
| 1959 | Grammy Awards | Best Broadway Show Album | Redhead | Won (Note: Tied with Ethel Merman for Gypsy.) | |
| 1958 | Laurel Awards | Top Female Musical Performance | Damn Yankees | Nominated | |
| 1958 | Laurel Awards | Top Female New Personality | —N/a | 4th Place | |
| 1979 | Los Angeles Drama Critics Circle Awards | Choreography | Dancin' (Note: Shared with Bob Fosse.) | Won | |
| 1998 | National Medal of Arts | —N/a | Actress & Dancer | Honored | |
| 1966 | Outer Critics Circle Awards | Best Performance | Sweet Charity | Won | |
| 1988 | Primetime Emmy Awards | Outstanding Guest Performer in a Drama Series | Magnum, P.I. (Episode: "Infinity and Jelly Doughnuts") | Nominated | |
| 1993 | Primetime Emmy Awards | Outstanding Guest Actress in a Comedy Series | Dream On (Episode: "For Peter's Sake") | Nominated | |
| 1993 | Primetime Emmy Awards | Outstanding Guest Actress in a Drama Series | Homicide: Life on the Street (Episode: "Ghost of a Chance") | Nominated | |
| 1985 | Saturn Awards | Best Supporting Actress | Cocoon | Nominated | |
| 1996 | Screen Actors Guild Awards | Outstanding Performance by a Female Actor in a Supporting Role | Marvin's Room | Nominated | |
| 1996 | Screen Actors Guild Awards | Outstanding Performance by a Cast in a Motion Picture | Marvin's Room | Nominated | |
| 1953 | Theatre World Awards | —N/a | Can-Can | Won | |
| 1954 | Tony Awards | Distinguished Supporting or Featured Musical Actress | Can-Can | Won | |
| 1956 | Tony Awards | Best Leading Actress in a Musical | Damn Yankees | Won | |
| 1958 | Tony Awards | Best Leading Actress in a Musical | New Girl in Town | Won (Note: Tied with Thelma Ritter for New Girl in Town.) | |
| 1959 | Tony Awards | Best Leading Actress in a Musical | Redhead | Won | |
| 1966 | Tony Awards | Best Leading Actress in a Musical | Sweet Charity | Nominated | |
| 1976 | Tony Awards | Best Leading Actress in a Musical | Chicago | Nominated | |
