= Hurricane Smith (1941 film) =

1941 film by Bernard Vorhaus

- Theatrical release poster
- Directed by: Bernard Vorhaus
- Screenplay by: Robert Presnell Sr.
- Story by: Charles G. Booth
- Produced by: Robert North
- Starring: Ray Middleton; Jane Wyatt; Harry Davenport; J. Edward Bromberg; Henry Brandon; Casey Johnson
- Cinematography: Ernest Miller
- Edited by: Edward Mann
- Music by: Mort Glickman; Marlin Skiles
- Production company: Republic Pictures
- Distributed by: Republic Pictures
- Release date: July 20, 1941
- Running time: 68 minutes
- Country: United States
- Language: English

Hurricane Smith is a 1941 American action film directed by Bernard Vorhaus and written by Robert Presnell Sr.. The film stars Ray Middleton, Jane Wyatt, Harry Davenport, J. Edward Bromberg, Henry Brandon and Casey Johnson. The film was released on July 20, 1941, by Republic Pictures.

== Plot ==
Hurricane Smith is a rodeo rider, who is wrongly convicted of murder and robbery, but escapes and creates a new start for himself. However one of the real criminals shows up too, since he believes that Smith has some of his loot.

== Cast ==
- Ray Middleton as 'Hurricane' Smith
- Jane Wyatt as Joan Bradley
- Harry Davenport as Robert Ingersoll Reed
- J. Edward Bromberg as 'Eggs' Bonelli
- Henry Brandon as Sam Carson
- Casey Johnson as Johnny Smith
- Frank Darien as 'Pop' Wessell
- Charles Trowbridge as Mark Harris
- Howard Hickman as Sen. Bradley
- Emmett Vogan as Prosecuting Attorney
