= Joe Penner =

American actor (1904–1941)

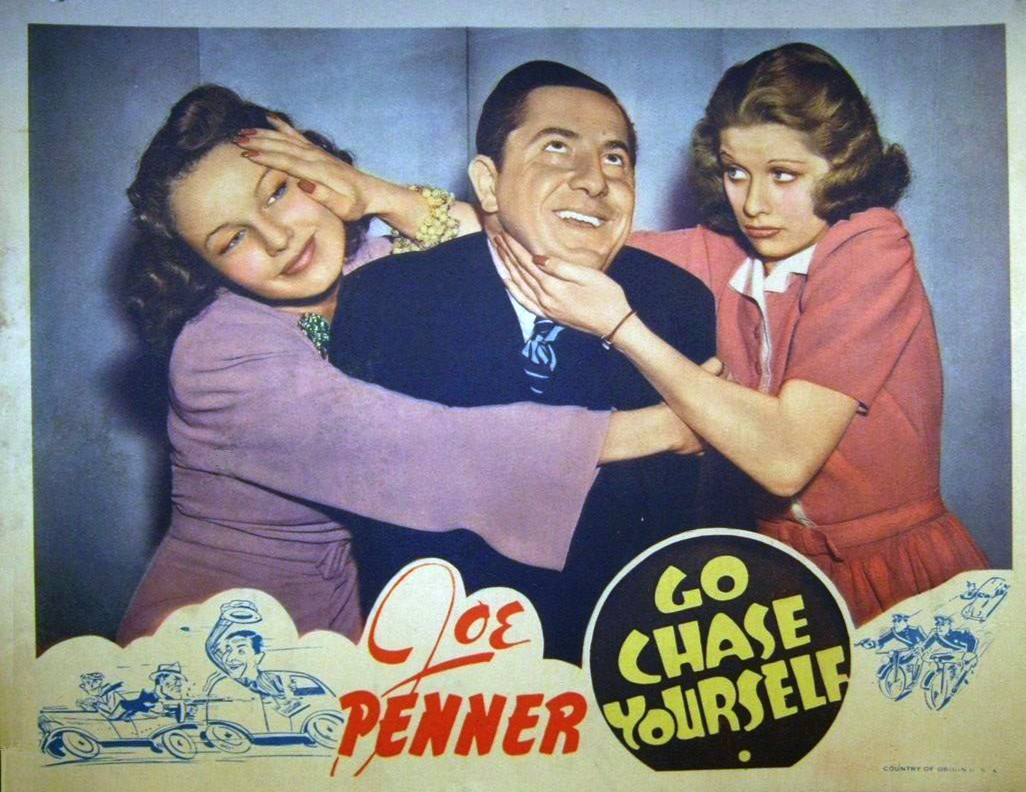
- Lobby card from Go Chase Yourself (1938) with June Travis, Joe Penner, and Lucille Ball
- Born: József Pintér; November 11, 1904; Nagybecskerek, Austria-Hungary (now Zrenjanin, Serbia)
- Died: January 10, 1941 (aged 36); Philadelphia, Pennsylvania, U.S.
- Occupations: Radio & film comedian
- Years active: 1931–1940
- Spouse: Eleanor May Vogt (m. 1928)

Joe Penner (born József Pintér; November 11, 1904 – January 10, 1941) was an American vaudeville, radio, and film comedian.

== Vaudeville and burlesque ==
In 1917, Penner's acts in which he dressed as Charlie Chaplin earned him 38 cents per week. Thanks to his clowning and "Wanna Buy a Duck?" routine, he was soon in small-time burlesque and vaudeville. A high point came when he performed in the Greenwich Village Follies in Chicago in 1926. After this break, he toured in mainstream vaudeville until its gradual demise around 1932.. He developed his catch phrases in burlesque. In 1932 he toured in a vaudeville revue with Eddie Tamblyn.

== Radio ==
NBC brought together (l to r) Bob Burns, Tommy Riggs, Charlie McCarthy, Edgar Bergen, Rudy Vallée and Joe Penner.

.

Penner was launched on his successful radio career by Rudy Vallée, appearances which led to his own Sunday evening half-hour, The Baker's Broadcast, which began on NBC's Blue Network on October 8, 1933. Penner was a zany comic, noted for his famed catchphrase, "Wanna buy a duck?", and his low hyuck-hyuck laugh.

He was voted radio's top comedian in 1934, but a 1935 dispute with the ad agency over the show's format resulted in Penner quitting The Baker's Broadcast on June 30, 1935. Vox Pop began as a summer replacement series for Penner in 1935. A year later, he returned with the situation comedy The Park Avenue Penners, which began airing October 4, 1936 on CBS, sponsored by Cocomalt, with Harry Conn as his new head writer. That program aired until June 26, 1938, after which Penner headlined The Joe Penner Show on CBS from October 6, 1938, to March 30, 1939, and returned to NBC for The Tip Top Show from October 5, 1939, to April 25, 1940.

== Film ==
Penner's first film appearances were in Vitaphone shorts "Service Stripes" (1930) and "Moving In" (1931).

Penner's full-length films include College Rhythm (1934) and New Faces of 1937.

He was caricatured by Tex Avery and Friz Freleng in the musical cartoon, My Green Fedora, the Popeye the Sailor cartoon Can You Take It?, several pictures starring the bumbling stooge Egghead, and the Disney cartoon Mother Goose Goes Hollywood in which he says "Wanna buy a duck?" with Donald Duck on a plate.

After covering the 1932–34 rise of Jack Pearl, Elizabeth McLeod summed up Penner's popularity:

The ultimate Depression-era zany was Joe Penner. A forgotten performer today to most, and little more than a footnote to the average OTR [old-time radio] fan, Penner was a national craze in 1933–34. There is no deep social meaning in his comedy, no shades of subtlety — just utter slapstick foolishness, delivered in an endearingly simpering style that's the closest thing the 1930s had to Pee-wee Herman. An added attraction was Penner's in-character singing each week of a whimsical novelty song, specially written to suit his style. Like [Jack] Pearl, however, Penner was doomed to early decline by the sheer repetitiveness of his format, even though he remained very popular with children right up to the end of his radio career.

== Personal life ==
In 1928, he married showgirl Eleanor May Vogt.

Penner died from a heart attack in his sleep in Philadelphia, Pennsylvania on January 10, 1941, aged 36. His funeral in Los Angeles was attended by more than 2,000 people.

== Filmography ==
- The Life of the Party (1937)
- Mr. Doodle Kicks Off (1938)
- Go Chase Yourself (1938)
- The Day the Bookies Wept (1939)
- Millionaire Playboy (1940)
- The Boys from Syracuse (1940)

== Listen to ==
- Joe Penner and Rudy Vallee on The Fleishmann's Yeast Hour July 13, 1933
