= JC Studios =

Former film and television studio

Coordinates: 40.61834°N 73.96107°W

JC Studios was a film and television studio located at 1268 East 14th Street in the Midwood section of Brooklyn, New York. The land on which the studio buildings were situated can trace its motion picture history back to around 1903, when it served as a studio and backlot for Vitagraph and Florence Turner, its first Vitagraph girl. Vitagraph's main Brooklyn facility was located across East 14th Street on property occupied by the Shulamith School for Girls until 2010. In 2017 the site became an eight-story, 300-unit apartment building. Warner Bros built the main studio, bordering on Locust Avenue, in 1936 for use as a short-subject production facility.

NBC bought the site in 1951 from Warner Brothers and converted the studio into a state-of-the-art color broadcasting facility. Betty Hutton was the star of the first NBC show from what was dubbed Brooklyn Studio I, Satins and Spurs on 12 September 1954. Notable television shows originating at JC Studios while under NBC ownership include Peter Pan with Mary Martin, the Kraft Music Hall, Sing Along with Mitch starring Mitch Miller, A Night to Remember, Hullabaloo, The Sammy Davis Jr. Show, Tic Tac Dough and three 1976 episodes of Saturday Night Live.

In 1956, NBC produced its famous “The Esther Williams Aqua Spectacle” here. The swimming pool constructed for the show was hidden under the floor of Studio I.

JC Studios played host to a number of popular and long-lasting television shows, The Cosby Show, Another World, and As the World Turns which was canceled by CBS in December 2009. The final episode was taped on 23 June 2010 and aired on 17 September 2010.

In 2014 JC Studios closed. Today OHEL Children's Home and Family Services is in the former Brooklyn Studio I. In 2019 Brooklyn Studio II, opened by NBC on November 29, 1956, was converted to a self-storage facility.

== See also ==
- NBC Studios
- Vitagraph Studios
