= Bert Granet =

American writer & television producer (1910-2002)

Bert Granet (July 10, 1910 – November 15, 2002) was an American writer and television producer whose credits included The Locket (1946) for RKO Radio Pictures.

Granet worked with Desilu Productions and was instrumental in getting Rod Serling's The Twilight Zone on the air in the late 1950s when he produced his successful pilot pitch The Time Element for Westinghouse Desilu Playhouse. Granet served as the show's producer during its fourth and fifth seasons. He also produced the series The Untouchables.

Granet died of injuries from a fall in 2002 at age 92.
