= Guys and Dolls (original Broadway cast recording) =

Guys & Dolls: A Musical Fable of Broadway
- CD cover

Cast recording by the original cast
- Released: January 8, 1951
- Genre: Show tunes
- Label: Decca

Professional ratings
Review scores
Source	Rating
AllMusic	5/5 stars

Guys and Dolls, subtitled A Musical Fable of Broadway, is the album containing the original Broadway cast recording of the 1950 musical Guys and Dolls. It was released by Decca Records early in the next year.

The album topped US Billboard's best-selling 33⅓ rpm records chart for the week of March 17, 1951.

The album has been reissued in 2000 by MCA as part of its "Broadway Gold" series, with the Show Music magazine noting that it "sounds much better on CD".

== Legacy ==
The album was added to the National Recording Registry as being "culturally or historically significant".

== Track listing ==
12" LP (Decca DL 8036)

Side 1
No.	Title	Artist(s)	Length
1.	"Runyonland Music" – "Fugue for Tinhorns" – "Follow the Fold"	Stubby Kaye – Johnny Silver – Douglas Deane – Isabel Bigley and the Mission Group
2.	"The Oldest Established"	Sam Levene – Stubby Kaye – Johnny Silver and male chorus
3.	"I'll Know"	Robert Alda – Isabel Bigley
4.	"A Bushel and a Peck"	Vivian Blaine and the Hot Box Girls
5.	"Adelaide's Lament"	Vivian Blaine
6.	"Guys and Dolls"	Stubby Kaye – Johnny Silver
7.	"If I Were a Bell"	Isabel Bigley
8.	"My Time of Day"	Robert Alda

Side 2
No.	Title	Artist(s)	Length
1.	"I've Never Been in Love Before"	Robert Alda – Isabel Bigley
2.	"Take Back Your Mink"	Vivian Blaine and the Hot Box Girls
3.	"More I Cannot Wish You"	Pat Rooney, Sr.
4.	"Luck Be a Lady"	Robert Alda and the guys
5.	"Sue Me"	Vivian Blaine – Sam Levene
6.	"Sit Down, You're Rockin' the Boat"	Stubby Kaye with chorus
7.	"Marry the Man Today" – Reprise: "Guys and Dolls"	Vivian Blaine – Isabel Bigley with Chorus

== Charts ==
Chart (1951)	Peak position
US Billboard Best Selling Pop Albums – Best Selling 33⅓ R.P.M.	1
