= Sue Me (Loesser song) =

1950 popular music song

Song
- Published: 1950
- Songwriter: Frank Loesser

"Sue Me" is a show tune written by Frank Loesser for the 1950 musical Guys and Dolls. In the musical it is performed as a comic duet between longtime fiancés Nathan Detroit and Miss Adelaide, originated on Broadway by Sam Levene and Vivian Blaine, respectively. The song was written to accommodate Levene, an actor with limited singing ability, and became Nathan's only featured song in the original stage production.

The song notably contrasts Adelaide's rapid accusations with Nathan's comparatively simple, pleading responses. Music theorists describe this as an "argumentative" or "antiphonal" duet, in which the two characters principally alternate rather than singing together. In the 1955 film adaptation, the song is performed by Frank Sinatra and Vivian Blaine as Nathan and Adelaide.

== History ==
=== Composition ===
The song was introduced in the Broadway musical Guys and Dolls, which opened at the 46th Street Theater on November 24, 1950.

Composer and lyricist Frank Loesser specifically wrote "Sue Me" for Sam Levene, and structured the song so he and Vivian Blaine never sang their showstopping duet together. The son of a cantor, Sam Levene was fluent in Yiddish: "Alright, already, I'm just a no-goodnick; alright, already, it's true, so nu? So sue me". Frank Loesser felt "Nathan Detroit should be played as a brassy Broadway tough guy who sang with more grits than gravy. Sam Levene sang "Sue Me" with such a wonderful Runyonesque flavor that his singing had been easy to forgive, in fact it had been quite charming in its ineptitude." "Musically, Sam Levene may have been tone-deaf, but he inhabited Frank Loesser's world as a character more than a caricature", says Levene, not an accomplished singer, was still considered particularly well suited to play Nathan Detroit, and Loesser accommodated his vocal limitations in writing the role. "Sue Me" was Nathan's only major musical number.

=== Recordings and performances ===
Levene and Blaine recorded "Sue Me" for the original Broadway cast album in December 1950, for release in 1951, and Levene's unconventional delivery became closely associated with the number. A retrospective review of the recording notes that although later performers playing Nathan were generally stronger singers, Levene's barely on-pitch performance was particularly effective dramatically, making his performance with Blaine a model of the comedy duet.

Bandleader Al Goodman considered "Sue Me" the Guys and Dolls song that "best catches the Damon Runyon atmosphere", also praising Don Cornell for recording a cover that approached it more as a ballad. Goodman predicted that the song would follow the show's "A Bushel and a Peck" into the hit category. Morey Amsterdam also recorded a solo version with the Al Goodman Orchestra in New York in late 1950.

Nathan Lane and Faith Prince performed the number as Nathan and Adelaide in the acclaimed 1992 Broadway revival. A review of the revival's cast recording for AllMusic said that Lane's performances in "The Oldest Established" and "Sue Me" demonstrated his "comic genius". Playbill later called their rendition a "definitive" performance of the song, and a 1992 Los Angeles Times review of the television documentary on the recording of the revival album deemed Lane and Prince's rendition as a highlight.

== Context ==
"Sue Me" occurs late in the second act. Nightclub singer Adelaide has been established as having been engaged to Nathan Detroit, who runs an illegal floating craps game, for fourteen years. Adelaide is prepared to elope with Nathan, but when she finds him and tries to convince him to elope, he says he has to go to a prayer meeting. Adelaide becomes angry, believing Nathan is lying to her. Nathan finally professes his love for her ("Sue Me") and leaves.

Music theorist Michael Buchler identifies "Sue Me" as an example of what he terms Loesser's "argumentative duet", a form in which characters exchange, interrupt, or overlap one another's lines rather than following more conventional patterns of separately singing verses before eventually joining together. Buchler identifies the technique as one of Loesser's contributions to musical theater and observes that Loesser employed it in both of the second-act duets "Sue Me" and "Marry the Man Today". Adelaide delivers her complaints in fast, agitated passages, while Nathan answers with slower and simpler pleas. Their contrasting musical material dramatizes the inability of the two characters to communicate. Buchler has elsewhere described the number as an "antiphonal duet": the characters alternate, sometimes interrupting each other, and sing essentially different melodies. Unlike many of Loesser's Broadway songs, "Sue Me" remains in the same key throughout.

The contrasting musical characterization continues through the accompaniment and meter. Adelaide's sections are dominated by rapid rhythmic movement expressing her mounting frustration, while Nathan's responses take on a waltz-like quality as he repeatedly attempts to placate her. The vocal lines seldom overlap, reinforcing the sense that the duet is a musical argument rather than a conventional love duet. A retrospective review in The Guardian stated that "the duets, Sue Me and I'll Know, are proper conversations – bust-ups in fact – not the standard one-verse-for-him, one-verse-for-her".
