= Guys and Dolls (disambiguation) =

Guys and Dolls is a 1950 stage musical.

Guys and Dolls may also refer to:

- Guys and Dolls (original Broadway cast recording), a 1951 album
- Guys and Dolls, a 1932 book of short stories by Damon Runyon, on some of whose tales the 1950 musical is based
- Guys and Dolls (film), a 1955 adaptation of the musical
- "Guys and Dolls" (Married... with Children), an episode of the TV series Married... with Children
- Guys 'n' Dolls, a 1970s UK pop group
- "Guys and Dolls", an episode of the TV series My Babysitter's A Vampire
- Guys and Dolls (greyhounds), a UK greyhound racing competition
