= James Randolph =

James Randolph may refer to:

- Jimmy Randolph (born 1934), New York singer and performer
- James Henry Randolph (1825–1900), US congressman from Tennessee
- James F. Randolph, U.S. Representative from New Jersey
- James Innes Randolph (1837–1887), Confederate army officer and poet
