= Jitterbugs =

1943 film by Malcolm St. Clair

- Theatrical poster
- Directed by: Malcolm St. Clair
- Written by: Scott Darling
- Produced by: Sol M. Wurtzel
- Starring: Stan Laurel; Oliver Hardy; Vivian Blaine; Robert Bailey; Douglas Fowley; Noel Madison; Lee Patrick; Robert Emmett Keane
- Cinematography: Lucien N. Andriot
- Edited by: Norman Colbert
- Music by: Lew Pollack; Leigh Harline
- Distributed by: 20th Century Fox
- Release date: June 25, 1943
- Running time: 74 minutes
- Country: United States
- Language: English

Jitterbugs is an American 1943 Laurel and Hardy feature-length musical comedy film produced by Sol M. Wurtzel and directed by Mal St.Clair.

== Plot ==
Stan and Ollie are musicians traveling across the U.S. as "The Original Zoot Suit Band". During their journey, they encounter Chester Wright who purports to possess a revolutionary pill capable of converting water into fuel. In reality, Chester is a swindler who substitutes water canisters with gasoline unnoticed by Stan and Ollie.

The trio devises a scheme to exploit Stan and Ollie's musical performance to attract a crowd, enabling Chester to peddle his fraudulent product. Despite initial success, their ruse unravels when a customer experiences a disastrous accident due to the pill's ineffectiveness. To evade retaliation, Chester masquerades as a police officer, feigning arrest of Stan and Ollie. Subsequently, Susan, a choir singer acquainted with the trio, seeks their assistance in reclaiming her mother's swindled funds. Adopting aliases, they infiltrate a hotel where the con men responsible for the scam are lodged. Ollie fabricates an ostentatious display of wealth, enticing the gang's leader, Corcoran.

Disguised as a woman, Stan unwittingly complicates their plans, while Ollie orchestrates a confrontation with Corcoran, coercing him into returning the stolen funds. The group concocts a new scheme involving Susan's employment at Bennett's club, aiming to retrieve the remaining funds. Amidst subterfuge and double-crosses, the trio manages to secure Bennett's funds, but their deception is uncovered, leading to their capture by the gang. Trapped aboard Bennett's vessel, they engineer a daring escape, culminating in the gang's apprehension by the authorities.

Chester redeems himself by demonstrating his genuine intentions to return the money to Susan's mother. Stan and Ollie bid farewell to Susan and Chester, opting for a hasty departure to evade the remaining gangsters.

== Cast ==
- Stan Laurel as Stan
- Oliver Hardy as Ollie
- Vivian Blaine as Susan Cowan
- Bob Bailey as Chester Wright
- Douglas Fowley as Malcolm Bennett
- Noel Madison as Tony Queen
- Lee Patrick as Dorcas
- Robert Emmett Keane as Henry Corcoran
- Gladys Blake as Dice-game operator
- James Bush as Jimmy O'Grady
- Anthony Caruso as Mike
- Chick Collins as Joe Taylor
- Jimmy Conlin as Barker for Bearded Lady
- Francis Ford as Skeptical Old-Timer
- Jack Green as Policeman
- Harrison Greene as Angry Carnival Patron
- Charles Halton as Samuel L. Cass
- Bud Lawler as Intern
- Carl M. Leviness as Hotel Clerk's Assistant
- George Magrill as Riverboat Passenger
- Bert Moorhouse as Henchman
- Tom Quinn as Riverboat Passenger
- Syd Saylor as Carnival Barker for Fatima

== Production ==
During the early 1940s, 20th Century Fox executives determined that low-budget "B” serve as the second feature on double bills. As such, these comedies were limited to a length of approximately 70 minutes ``irrespective of any artistic considerations.”

Much of the film, scripted by Scott Darling and St. Clair, was improvised by Laurel and Hardy or reworked from earlier films they made with director Hal Roach.

== Reception ==
Film critic Bosley Crowther in the New York Times provides a mixed review, describing the gag routines as largely recycled from the Laurel and Hardy repertoire. Crowther allows that the film is “funny…neither the worst nor the best of the boys' films. Why do they call it ‘Jitterbugs’? Say, who let that radical in?”

== Retrospective appraisal ==
The film is notable for its dance sequences and the interaction between the duo with Vivian Blaine and Lee Patrick. Blaine, who later starred in the Broadway production of Guys and Dolls, was among those who honored Laurel and Hardy during their December 1954 appearance on NBC's This Is Your Life.

Jitterbugs is considered to be the best Laurel and Hardy film made under 20th Century Fox. Film historian Ruth Anne Dwyer writes:

Jitterbugs demonstrates superior production values and a good cast. Stan Laurel is particularly funny during a segment in which he dresses as a spinster aunt, a part he appears to enjoy greatly. The film has a delightful conclusion on a cruise ship which slips its moorings.
