= Willie Dynamite =

1973 film by Gilbert Moses

- Theatrical release poster.
- Directed by: Gilbert Moses
- Written by: Ron Cutler; Joe Keyes, Jr.
- Produced by: David Brown; Richard D. Zanuck
- Starring: Roscoe Orman; Diana Sands; Thalmus Rasulala; Joyce Walker
- Cinematography: Frank Stanley
- Edited by: Aaron Stell
- Music by: J. J. Johnson
- Production company: The Zanuck/Brown Company
- Distributed by: Universal Pictures
- Release date: December 19, 1973 (Chicago)
- Running time: 102 minutes
- Country: United States
- Language: English

Willie Dynamite is a 1973 American blaxploitation film directed by Gilbert Moses and starring Roscoe Orman, Diana Sands, Thalmus Rasulala, Joyce Walker, and was released by Universal Pictures. The eponymous Willie Dynamite is a pimp in New York City, who strives to be number one in the city. As he is trying to do so, a social worker named Cora, is trying to change his ways – as well as those of the women who work for him – for the better. It was the first film produced by the Zanuck-Brown Company.

== Plot ==
Willie Dynamite appears as the film's opening credits begin, with Martha Reeves singing the title song, 'Willie Dynamite.' Willie is driving his 'pimped-out' purple Cadillac on the streets of midtown Manhattan. The front license plate reading the first part of his nickname - 'Willie,' and the back license plate reading the second part - 'Dynamite.' Willie's destination is a midtown hotel, to collect payment from his women - who work the midtown hotels, attracting the many businessmen, conventioneers, who are looking for sex.

Willie's 'stable' of seven women are of all ethnicities, dressed in vibrant outfits. Their entrance into the Business International Association convention - by entering as an ensemble through the hotel's main doors in-sync with the title song's description of them - has all the men in the room ogling them. Many conventioneers - including even a pair of police officers - take the women to their hotel rooms. Pashen is the newest hooker working for Willie, and she is last in line to hand in her payments. Willie gets mad at her for producing less than expected. Willie compares his business with those of a production line: "Seven girls out there. Every ten minutes, one comes off the production line, like that. This is a business, baby, a production line, and just like GM, Ford, Chrysler, Willie's comin' through." Willie tells of his dreams of being the number one, top-pimp in New York City.

Bell, currently the number one pimp, holds a 'pimp council,' and tells the gathered pimps of the police cracking down on prostitution activities across the city. Bell makes a business proposal, wherein each pimp will get his own area to run, instead of the pimps competing for territory. Everyone agrees, except Willie. He argues the idea would hurt his business. Willie says his women are akin to 'animals of the jungle,' having the need to 'roam free,' and 'conquer all that can be controlled.'

Soon after the meeting ends, Willie learns Pashen has been arrested. Cora is a social worker, who tries to get the prostitutes in jail to get out of the business and turn their lives around. Cora meets Pashen, and tries to educate her on the dangers of being a prostitute. Cora encourages Pashen to change her life, and, as she's so young and pretty, to become a model and get paid for it. Being naïve, Pashen dismisses the idea, believing she can make more money as a hooker for Willie. Willie comes to post bail and gets Pashen out of jail. While Willie is out of his apartment, Cora makes an unexpected visit, and tells the women they are being ripped off by Willie. They ponder what Cora said as she leaves the apartment. When Willie comes back, he learns Pashen has been arrested again and the other women are reluctant to work. Willie threatens them if they decide to not work.

Cora visits the jail and tries again to persuade Pashen to get out of prostitution. Pashen still insists prostitution - and being part of Willie's 'stable' - is okay, as she's making a lot of money, and she likes the men's attention while working, because she feels like someone 'important,' wanted & beautiful. Cora tells Pashen that she, too, was once a prostitute, on the streets. Cora sneaks into Willie's apartment to find records of Willie's bank accounts, which could provide evidence of his illegal activity, but, the materials she takes would not be able to stand up in court. After this second arrest, Pashen finally decides to take Cora's advice about pursuing modeling, and does a photo-shoot for which she gets paid. She tries to tell Willie she wants out, but, he tells her of his dreams and hopes for her (and for himself), which she's not able to refuse.

Willie goes to the hotel convention, and finds his territory has been invaded and his lead hooker, Honey, has been killed after a territorial battle. Willie's life is spiraling downward, as he finds all his bank accounts have been frozen, and he's under investigation by the Internal Revenue Service. Two detectives chase Willie through New York. Willie's seven hookers are arrested after the hotel fight, but Willie can't post bail, and the women are sent to the women's detention center for holding. While in the detention center, Pashen's face gets cut, and she's traumatized by her loss of beauty.

When Willie returns home, he is met by Bell and his men, who tells Willie to quit the business, and a fight ensues. Later, Willie is caught by the same two detectives, for possession of drugs. They have to free Willie, as the evidence obtained was done so without a warrant. In the end, Willie thinks back on past events, and after hearing news of his mother's dying, leaves his car - and by inference, pimping - for good. The film ends with Willie walking happily down the streets.

== Cast ==
- Roscoe Orman as William Andrew "Willie Dynamite" Short, an ambitious pimp in New York City wanting to become the top, always shown with a vibrant sense of fashion
- Diana Sands as Cora Williams, a social worker who was once a prostitute on the streets, trying to reform Willie Dynamite in his ways
- Thalmus Rasulala as Robert Daniels, Cora's lover who is a district attorney, also fighting to put Willie Dynamite in jail
- Joyce Walker as Pashen, the newest prostitute of Willie, who strives to make good money after being rescued from Willie
- Norma Donaldson as "Honey", Willie's head hooker, whose job is to make sure the other hookers are working, and who dies after a fight with hookers from another pimp
- Roger Robinson as Bell, the top pimp of the city, fighting with Willie and his hookers to maintain control of his top status
- Albert Hall as Pointer, the black detective chasing Willie, an orthodox man
- George Murdock as Celli, the white detective who would do anything for a shortcut and to get paid

== Production ==
Willie Dynamite is always shown with a bright colored outfit, stereotypical outfit for the pimp. He is always wearing a hat that matches the rest of his outfit. He is first seen wearing a bright candy red suit with a white-striped red jacket and matching white-striped red hat. The second outfit that he is seen in is a clover green suit with a red scarf. With this, he is also wearing a large fur coat and hat. When he is detained by the police for the first time, he is wearing a white fur-striped brown lamb coat, which he loudly announces, "Brown coat? This is lamb! I paid over a grand for it!" after he is under suspicion for armed robbery for wearing a "brown coat." The next outfit he is dressed in is shiny and gold.

== Blaxploitation theme ==
The film produces many of the qualities seen in blaxploitation films, popular in the 1970s. Blaxploitation films would present a black character, usually shown in the ghetto, characterized by poverty, drugs, and violence. These black characters would be seen pitted against white characters of power, usually the police, as seen in this film.

In one scene, Willie is aggressively detained by the police while driving. The charge is suspicion of armed robbery, fitting a description of wearing a brown coat. Willie is shouting that he is unlawfully charged and that it's unconstitutional, while the police are laughing about the detainment. This is an example of blaxploitation where white police are committing corrupt acts against black people. Willie is later let go after the police lineup proves his innocence. As he exits the station, a police officer tells Willie that his car was parked, by the police from the detainment, in a tow-away zone. With trouble as it is, he then finds two detectives unlawfully searching his car without a warrant. They tell him a black female overdosed and believed it was Willie's fault. The black detective tells Willie he should care, "Yeah Willie, she's my sister. She's your sister too."

When the two detectives are chasing Willie Dynamite through New York City, the white detective is seen on a rooftop telling the black detective what to do. This is a reflection of the 1970s, where white men had higher power in society, as blacks were a minority. The two detectives represent the blaxploitation images in film, the black detective as a hard working man going by the books, and the white detective looking anywhere for a shortcut. In another scene, the two detectives are talking to each other before their performance review on the police force. Celli, the white detective, reads the newspaper and tells Pointer that he may have to leave the force for his religion. Celli complains that Pointer is too orthodox in his ways, another example of white police looking for a shortcut to make money.

Inside the courtroom, when Willie is detained for possession, he announces that the police have obtained evidence without a warrant. This is a recurring example in blaxploitation films, where corrupt police use unorthodox ways to catch black criminals. However, the film has an unusually low body count for a blaxploitation film: a mere two, and one of them is an elderly woman who succumbs to a heart attack. This might be cited as an example of the filmmakers' desire to position it as a more serious example of the genre, the idea being that life has more value than is generally displayed in such films. Additionally, the idea of a Black Muslim cop lecturing Willie about what he is doing to "our people" was another unique touch.

== Release ==
Willie Dynamite premiered at the Woods Theatre in Chicago on December 19, 1973 and grossed $54,585 in its first week. It was released in New York City on January 24, 1974, and Los Angeles on March 27, 1974.

=== Home media ===
The film was released on DVD on January 11, 2005.

== Soundtrack ==
Martha Reeves sang the title song on the soundtrack album. J. J. Johnson composed and produced the original soundtrack.
