= Isabel Bigley =

American actress (1926–2006)

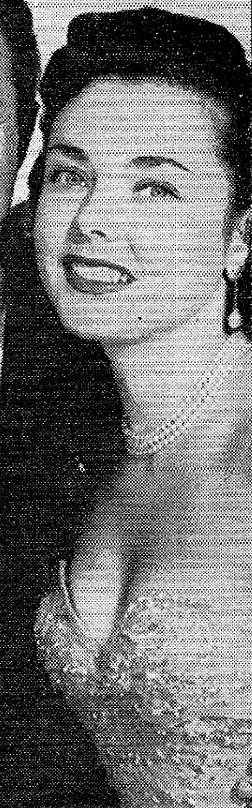
- Born: February 23, 1926; Bronx, New York, U.S.
- Died: September 30, 2006 (aged 80); Los Angeles, California, U.S.
- Resting place: Westwood Memorial Park, Los Angeles, California
- Occupations: Actress, singer
- Spouse: Lawrence Barnett (m. 1953)
- Children: 6

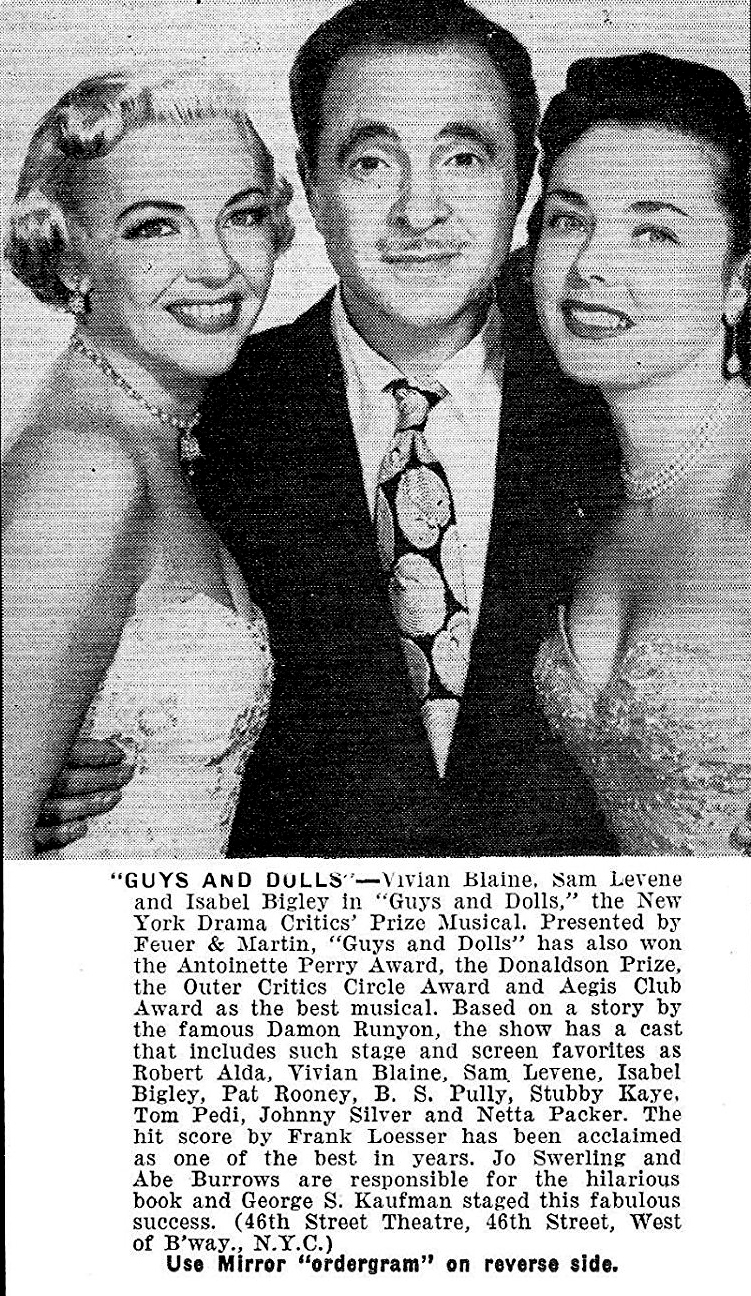
Vivian Blaine, Sam Levene and Bigley on the ordergram to purchase tickets to the 1950 original Broadway production of Guys and Dolls

Isabel Bigley (February 23, 1926 – September 30, 2006) was an American actress. She originated the part of Sarah Brown in Frank Loesser's Guys and Dolls.

== Biography ==
=== Early years ===
The Bronx-born Bigley's mother, a concert singer, guided her early interest in music, and her high school music teacher arranged for her to audition for a scholarship to the Juilliard School of Music in Manhattan, which she received. She studied singing with Metropolitan Opera contralto Merle Alcock. She attended Walton High School in the Bronx in addition to her summer vocal lessons at Juilliard. Her high school studies included stenography, which she put to use working for several firms on Wall Street.

=== Career ===
Taking an extended lunch break, Bigley auditioned to be a member of the chorus of Oklahoma! She was hired to understudy Laurey, but a few weeks later was starring in that role in the show's London production. That was her status in 1950 when she was offered the role of Sarah Brown, the "mission doll", in the original Broadway production of Guys and Dolls. For her performance, she received the Tony Award for Best Featured Actress in a Musical. She left Guys and Dolls in 1953 to star as Jeanie, the chorus girl, in the Rodgers and Hammerstein show Me and Juliet, a role created especially for her.

She performed frequently in the early days of television in such shows as The Ed Sullivan Show and The Colgate Comedy Hour. On June 25, 1951, she appeared with other entertainers in a one-hour program on CBS that was the start of nationally broadcast color television.

=== Personal life ===
In 1953, she married Lawrence R. Barnett, then president of the Music Corporation of America. She retired in 1958 to raise their four sons and two daughters. She died in 2006, aged 80, from pulmonary disease at Cedars-Sinai Medical Center in Los Angeles. Her widower died on June 11, 2012, aged 98.

Barnett and Bigley made many charitable contributions to arts education, including establishing a graduate program in arts policy and administration at Ohio State University.

Bigley lived in both Los Angeles and Rancho Mirage and in 2005 she was named chairwoman of the board of the McCallum Theatre in Palm Desert.
