= Adelaide's Lament =

Song from the 1950 musical Guys and Dolls

"Adelaide's Lament" is a show tune from the Broadway musical Guys and Dolls, written by Frank Loesser, which opened at the 46th Street Theatre on November 24, 1950. It was performed on stage by Vivian Blaine, who later reprised her role as Miss Adelaide in the 1955 film version of the play; in its biography of Blaine, the Encyclopædia Britannica describes her as "best remembered for her showstopping rendition of 'Adelaide's Lament' in both the Broadway and film productions of Guys and Dolls.

In the song, Adelaide alternates between reading sentences aloud from a pop psychology book and commenting on what she is reading. The textbook discusses psychosomatic illness, and the singer posits that her constant common cold may actually be a manifestation of her resentment over her fiancé's constant assurances of imminent marriage, which he never fulfills.

In a 50th-anniversary NPR retrospective on the making of the original Broadway production, Blaine recalled the creation of Miss Adelaide specifically to fit Blaine into the musical after the creators decided she was ill-suited to play the buttoned-up Sarah. In the same retrospective, host Scott Simon observed that "Adelaide's Lament" is "often considered a perfect comic song" and offered a clip of lyricist Fred Ebb's analysis of its appeal:

Here's a girl who's got a cold all through the play and she says she has a cold 'cause somebody isn't going to marry her. That's a very rich comic notion. And she's got these hilarious punch lines. You know, "if she's getting a kind of name for herself and the name ain't his; if she's tired of gettin' the fish eye from the hotel clerk." Every line in it is worth something. It means something; has impact. It has vitality. It has humor and charm and appropriateness. And I don't know how you can get much better than that.

— Lyricist Fred Ebb

In his book on Loesser, Thomas L. Riis wrote that "the number is filled with verbal dexterity, alliterative and assonantal rhymes at every possible point, and unexpected pollysyllabic insertions ('psychosomatic' and 'streptococci')." Riis compared the song's rhythmic pattern with "a blues plaint's emotional honesty. Audiences don't just laugh at Adelaide, they cheer her tenacity and passion".

== Recorded versions ==
- Vivian Blaine (1950, 1955)
- Norma Donaldson (1976), Broadway revival cast album (all-Black cast)
- Julia McKenzie (year unknown), 1980s London revival
- Barbra Streisand (1985), The Broadway Album
- Faith Prince (1992), 1992 Broadway revival cast album and Broadway: My Favorite Leading Ladies live recording
- Mandy Moore (2002), Broadway's Best on Bravo television special
- Debbie Reynolds (1963), Sinatra's Reprise Musical Repertory Theatre

=== Notable live performances ===
- Imelda Staunton, 1996 London Revival
- Jane Krakowski, 2005 London revival cast
- On the 25th annual Tony Awards in 1971, Vivian Blaine appeared as a guest performer and sang it, providing a visual recording of her performance for posterity.
