= Guys and Dolls (film) =

1955 film by Joseph L. Mankiewicz

- Theatrical release poster
- Directed by: Joseph L. Mankiewicz
- Screenplay by: Joseph L. Mankiewicz
- Based on: Guys and Dolls by Abe Burrows, Jo Swerling, Frank Loesser, Damon Runyon
- Produced by: Samuel Goldwyn
- Starring: Marlon Brando; Jean Simmons; Frank Sinatra; Vivian Blaine; Stubby Kaye; Johnny Silver; Robert Keith; B.S. Pully
- Cinematography: Harry Stradling
- Edited by: Daniel Mandell
- Music by: Frank Loesser
- Production company: Samuel Goldwyn Productions
- Distributed by: Metro-Goldwyn-Mayer
- Release date: November 3, 1955
- Running time: 150 minutes
- Country: United States
- Language: English
- Budget: $5.5 million
- Box office: $6.8 million (US/Canada rentals)

Guys and Dolls is a 1955 American musical film starring Marlon Brando, Jean Simmons, Frank Sinatra, and Vivian Blaine. The picture was made by Samuel Goldwyn Productions and released by MGM. It was directed by Joseph L. Mankiewicz, who also wrote the screenplay. The film is based on the 1950 Broadway musical by composer and lyricist Frank Loesser, with a book by Jo Swerling and Abe Burrows, which, in turn, was loosely based on "The Idyll of Miss Sarah Brown" (1933) and "Blood Pressure", two short stories by Damon Runyon. Dances were choreographed by Michael Kidd, who had staged the dances for the Broadway production.

The film opened on November 3, 1955, at the Capitol Theatre in New York City to critical and commercial success. As of September 2024, a remake of the film, directed, co-produced and co-written by Rob Marshall, was in pre-production.

== Plot ==
Gambler Nathan Detroit seeks to organize an unlicensed craps game, but the police, led by Lieutenant Brannigan, are "putting on the heat." Nathan's usual locations are turning him away due to Brannigan's intimidating pressure. The Biltmore garage will allow Nathan to hold a game, but the owner requires a $1,000 security deposit, which Nathan does not have. Adding to his problems, Nathan's fiancée, Miss Adelaide, a nightclub singer, wants to get married after being engaged for fourteen years. She also wants him to go straight, but his only talent is organizing illegal gambling.

Nathan spots an old acquaintance, Sky Masterson, a gambler willing to bet on virtually anything and for high amounts. To win the $1,000 security deposit, Nathan bets Sky that he cannot take a girl of Nathan's choosing to dinner in Havana, Cuba. Nathan then nominates Sergeant Sarah Brown, a sister at the Save a Soul Mission, which opposes gambling.

Sky pretends to be a repentant gambler to meet Sarah. Sky proposes a bargain: He will recruit a dozen sinners into the Mission for her Thursday-night meeting if she will have dinner with him in Havana. With General Matilda Cartwright threatening to close the Mission's Broadway branch due to low attendance, Sarah agrees to the date.

Meanwhile, confident that he will win the bet, Nathan gathers all the gamblers, including a visitor that Harry the Horse has invited: Big Jule, a mobster. When Lieutenant Brannigan appears, Benny Southstreet claims they are celebrating Nathan marrying Adelaide. Nathan is shocked, but is forced to play along. Later, he realizes he has lost his bet and must marry Adelaide.

Over the course of their stay in Cuba, Sky and Sarah begin to fall in love. They return to Broadway at dawn and meet the Save a Soul Mission band, which has been parading all night on Sky's advice. Police sirens are heard, and the gamblers, led by Nathan Detroit, flee out through the back room of the empty Mission where they were holding a craps game.

The police arrive too late to make any arrests, but Lieutenant Brannigan finds Sarah and the other Save a Soul members being absent unlikely to be a coincidence and suspects Sky. Sarah is equally suspicious that Sky had something to do with the crap game at the Mission, and takes her leave of him, refusing to accept his denials.

Sky still has to make good on his arrangement with Sarah to provide sinners to the Mission. Sarah would rather forget the whole thing, but Uncle Arvide Abernathy warns Sky that "If you don't make that marker good, I'm going to buzz it all over town you're a welcher."

Nathan has continued the crap game in a sewer. With his revolver visible in its shoulder holster, Big Jule, who has lost all his money, forces Nathan to play against him while he cheats, cleaning Nathan out. Sky enters, knocks Big Jule down, and removes his pistol. Sky, who has been stung and devastated by Sarah's rejection, lies to Nathan that he lost the bet about taking her to Havana and pays Nathan the $1,000. Nathan tells Big Jule he now has money to play him again, but Harry the Horse says that Big Jule cannot play without cheating because "he cannot make a pass to save his soul." Sky overhears this, and the phrasing inspires him to make a bet: He will roll the dice, and if he loses, he will give all the other gamblers $1,000 each; if he wins, they are all to attend a prayer meeting at the Mission.

The Mission is near closing when the gamblers arrive, filling the room; Sky won the bet. They confess their sins, though with little repentance. Nicely-Nicely Johnson however, recalling a dream he had the night before, seems to have an authentic connection to the Mission's aim, and this satisfies everyone.

When Nathan tells Sarah that Sky lost the Cuba bet, which she knows he won, she hurries off to make up with him. There is eventually a double wedding in Times Square, with Sky marrying Sarah, and Nathan marrying Adelaide, while Nicely plays bass drum in the Mission's marching band.

== Cast ==
- Marlon Brando as Sky Masterson
- Jean Simmons as Sister Sarah Brown
- Frank Sinatra as Nathan Detroit
- Vivian Blaine as Miss Adelaide
- Stubby Kaye as Nicely-Nicely Johnson
- Johnny Silver as Benny Southstreet
- B.S. Pully as Big Jule
- Robert Keith as Lieutenant Brannigan
- Sheldon Leonard as Harry the Horse
- Danny Dayton as Rusty Charlie
- Regis Toomey as Arvide Abernathy
- Kathryn Givney as General Matilda Cartwright
- George E. Stone as Society Max
- Veda Ann Borg as Laverne
- Kay E. Kuter as Calvin
- Renee Renor as Cuban Singer
- The Goldwyn Girls as the Hot Box Girls, including June Kirby, Pat Sheehan and Larri Thomas.
- Larri Thomas plays the seductive woman who dances with Marlon Brando in the Cuba sequence in addition to her role as the lead dancer at the Hot Box
- Matt Mattox is the uncredited, perpetually bent-over dancer in the Cuba sequence who Jean Simmons grabs for her partner

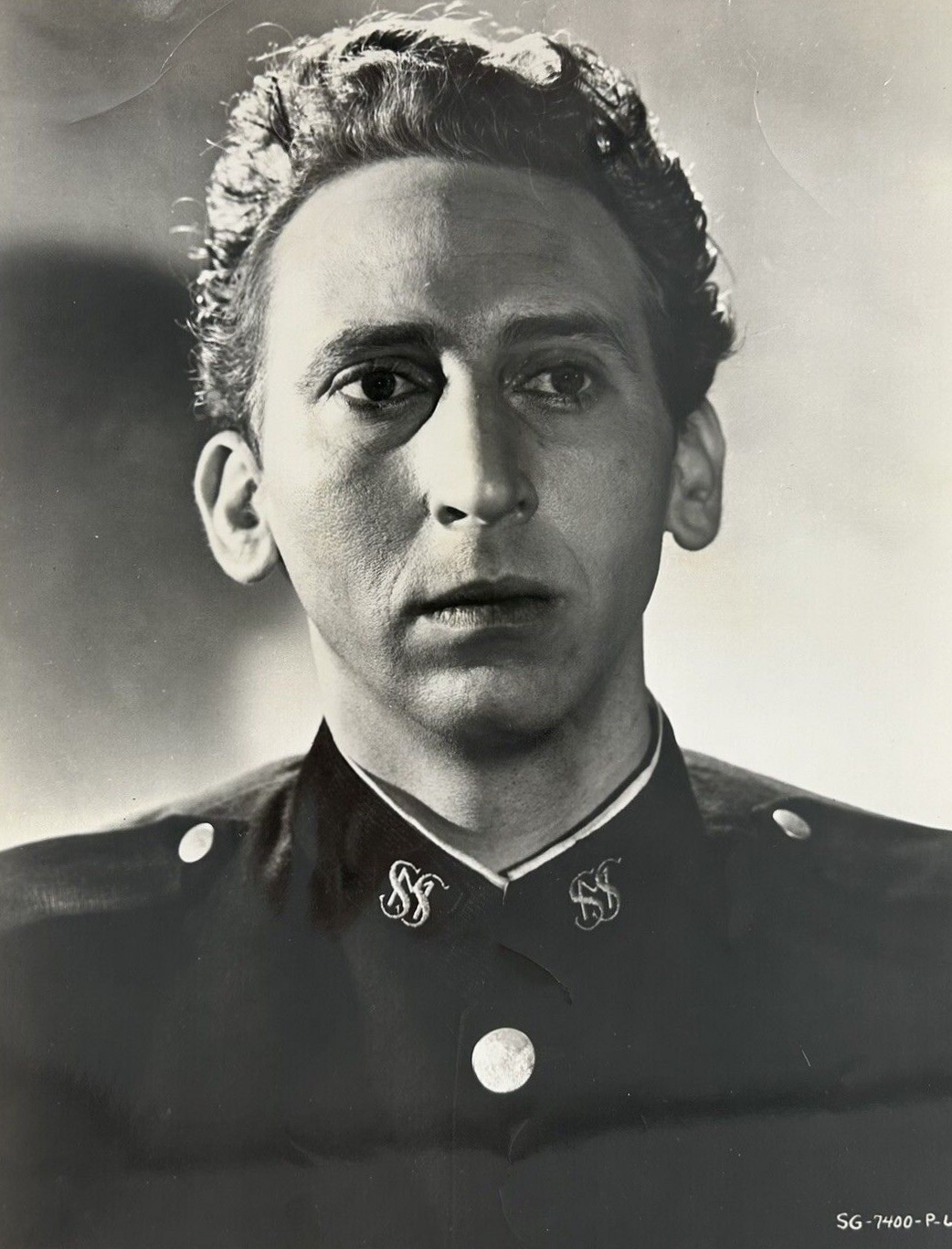
Press photo of Kay E. Kuter for the film

Robert Alda had originated the role of Sky Masterson on Broadway in 1950. For the movie, Gene Kelly at first seemed a serious candidate for the part. Ultimately, it went to Marlon Brando, partly because Metro-Goldwyn-Mayer would not loan Kelly for the production, but also because Goldwyn wanted to cast Brando, the world's biggest box office draw by a wide margin at that time. Ironically, the film ended up being distributed by MGM, Kelly's home studio. Frank Sinatra had coveted the role of Sky Masterson and his relations with Brando were strained. Hollywood critic James Bacon quotes Sinatra telling Mankiewicz, "When Mumbles is through rehearsing, I'll come out." Sinatra had been considered for the role of Terry Malloy in On the Waterfront; both roles went to Brando.

Initially, Betty Grable was considered to play the role of Miss Adelaide. However, Grable was not available, which led Goldwyn to cast Vivian Blaine, who had originated the role on stage. Marilyn Monroe had wanted the part of Adelaide, but a telephone request from her did not influence Mankiewicz, who wanted Blaine from the original production. In addition to Blaine, Stubby Kaye, B.S. Pully, and Johnny Silver all repeated their Broadway roles in the film.

Goldwyn wanted Grace Kelly for Sarah Brown, the Save-a-Soul sister. When she turned the part down because of other commitments, Goldwyn contacted Deborah Kerr, who was unavailable. The third choice was Jean Simmons, who had played opposite Brando in Désirée. Goldwyn was surprised by Simmons's sweet voice and strong acting and ultimately believed the love story worked better in the film than on stage. "I'm so happy," he said after seeing the rushes one day, "that I couldn't get Grace Kelly." Mankiewicz later called Simmons "the dream...a fantastically talented and enormously underestimated girl. In terms of talent, Jean Simmons is so many heads and shoulders above most of her contemporaries, one wonders why she didn't become the great star she could have been."

== Production ==
Vivian Blane reprised her role as Miss Adelaide which she previously played on Broadway. Sam Levene, who played the role of Nathan Detroit in the Broadway musical, lost the film role to Sinatra, even though Mankiewicz wanted Levene. "You can't have a Jew playing a Jew, it wouldn't work on screen," Goldwyn argued. Frank Loesser felt Sinatra played the part like a "dapper Italian swinger." Mankiewicz said "if there could be one person in the world more miscast as Nathan Detroit than Frank Sinatra that would be Laurence Olivier and I am one of his greatest fans; the role had been written for Sam Levene who was divine in it." Sinatra did his best to give Nathan Detroit a few stereotyped Jewish gestures and inflections, but Frank Loesser hated "how Sinatra turned the rumpled Nathan Detroit into a smoothie. Sam Levene's husky untrained voice added to the song's charm, not to mention its believability." Loesser died in 1969, still refusing to watch the film.

Brando and Sinatra reportedly did not get along when filming. Sinatra was reportedly upset that Brando was given the role of Sky over him. Stefan Kanfer observed: "The two men were diametrical opposites: Marlon required multiple takes; Frank detested repeating himself." Upon their first meeting Sinatra reportedly scoffed, "Don't give me any of that Actors Studio shit." Brando later quipped, "Frank is the kind of guy, when he dies, he's going to heaven and give God a hard time for making him bald." Frank Sinatra called Brando "the world's most overrated actor", and referred to him as "mumbles".

== Musical numbers ==
1. "Overture"
2. "Fugue for Tinhorns" - Nicely-Nicely, Benny, Rusty
3. "Follow the Fold" - Sarah
4. "The Oldest Established Floating Crap Game in New York" - Nathan, Benny, Nicely-Nicely
5. "I'll Know" - Sarah and Sky
6. "Pet Me Poppa" - Adelaide
7. "Adelaide's Lament" - Adelaide
8. "Guys and Dolls" - Nathan, Benny, Nicely-Nicely
9. "Adelaide" - Nathan
10. "If I Were a Bell" - Sarah and Sky
11. "A Woman In Love" - Sarah and Sky
12. "Take Back Your Mink" - Adelaide
13. "Luck Be a Lady" - Sky
14. "Sue Me" - Nathan and Adelaide
15. "Sit Down, You're Rockin' the Boat" - Nicely-Nicely
16. "Finale"

Numbers from the original musical include "Fugue for Tinhorns", "Luck Be a Lady", "Adelaide's Lament", "If I Were a Bell", and "Sit Down, You're Rockin' the Boat".

At Samuel Goldwyn and Mankiewicz's request, Frank Loesser wrote three new songs for the film: "Pet Me Poppa", "(Your Eyes Are the Eyes of) A Woman in Love", and "Adelaide", the last written specifically for Sinatra. Five songs from the stage show were not included in the movie: "A Bushel and a Peck," "I've Never Been in Love Before," "My Time of Day" (although portions of these three songs are heard instrumentally as background music), "Marry the Man Today," and "More I Cannot Wish You". Critic Peter Filichia wrote, "Those who only know musicals from movies have missed out on some great songs from the Broadway scores." He cited "A Bushel and a Peck" as an example, replaced in the film with the song "Pet Me, Poppa". Goldwyn did not like "A Bushel and a Peck" and said, "I just wanted a new song in the picture." Another song, "I've Never Been in Love Before," was replaced with "A Woman in Love". "Adelaide," sung by Sinatra, was added for the movie.

The musical numbers performed by Jean Simmons and Marlon Brando were sung by the actors themselves, without dubbing by professional singers.

== Reception ==
Guys and Dolls opened on November 3, 1955, at the Capitol Theatre in New York City to mostly positive reviews. Rotten Tomatoes reports that 91% out of 33 critics have given the film a positive review, with a rating average of 7.7/10 and the consensus: "An escapist and inventive cinemascope delight, Guys and Dolls glistens thanks to the charm of its ensemble." Casting Marlon Brando has long been somewhat controversial, although Variety wrote "The casting is good all the way." This was the only Samuel Goldwyn film released through MGM since he left Goldwyn Pictures in 1922. Its estimated budget was over $5 million. It grossed $155,000 at the Capitol in its first week. It expanded to Boston, Chicago and Philadelphia the following week and became the number one film in the US with a gross of $342,000. It remained at number one the following week and stayed at or near the top spot for a month moving back to the top for Christmas week where it stayed for five weeks. It went on to earn over $6.8 million in theatrical rentals from the United States and Canada and Variety ranked it as the number 1 moneymaking film of 1956.

According to MGM records, the film earned $2,262,000 in other markets, resulting in a total rental of $9,063,000.

Around the time of the film's release, American composer and lyricist Stephen Sondheim wrote film reviews for Films in Review. Sondheim (then aged 25) reviewed the film version of Guys and Dolls, and observed: "Sinatra ambles through his role as Nathan Detroit as though he were about to laugh at the jokes in the script. He has none of the sob in the voice, and the incipient ulcer in the stomach, that the part requires and Sam Levene supplied so hilariously on the stage. Sinatra sings on pitch, but colorlessly; Levene sang off pitch, but acted while he sang. Sinatra's lackadaisical performance, his careless and left handed attempt at characterization not only harm the picture immeasurably but indicate an alarming lack of professionality."

== Awards and nominations ==
Award	Category	Nominee(s)	Result	Ref.
Academy Awards	Best Art Direction – Color	Art Direction: Oliver Smith and Joseph C. Wright; Set Decoration: Howard Bristol	Nominated	
Academy Awards	Best Cinematography – Color	Harry Stradling	Nominated	
Academy Awards	Best Costume Design – Color	Irene Sharaff	Nominated	
Academy Awards	Best Scoring of a Musical Picture	Jay Blackton and Cyril J. Mockridge	Nominated	
British Academy Film Awards	Best Film from any Source		Nominated	
British Academy Film Awards	Best Foreign Actress	Jean Simmons	Nominated	
Golden Globe Awards	Best Motion Picture – Musical or Comedy		Won	
Golden Globe Awards	Best Actress in a Motion Picture – Musical or Comedy	Jean Simmons	Won	
Writers Guild of America Awards	Best Written American Musical	Joseph L. Mankiewicz	Nominated	

- In 2004, the AFI ranked the song "Luck Be a Lady" at No. 42 on their list of the 100 greatest film songs, AFI's 100 Years...100 Songs. In 2006 Guys and Dolls ranked No. 23 on the American Film Institute's list of best musicals.

== Planned remake ==
20th Century Fox acquired the film rights to the musical in early 2013 and was planning a remake. In March 2019, TriStar Pictures acquired the remake rights, with Bill Condon hired as director in July 2021. In September 2024, Rob Marshall replaced Condon as the new director, and co-wrote a new screenplay with his partner John DeLuca, along with John Requa and Glenn Ficarra. Serving as producers are Marshall, DeLuca, John Goldwyn, Marc Toberoff and Marc Platt.

== See also ==
- List of American films of 1955
