= A Bushel and a Peck =

1950 popular music song

Song
- Published: 1950
- Songwriter: Frank Loesser

"A Bushel and a Peck" is a popular song from the musical Guys and Dolls. It was written by Frank Loesser and published in 1950. Both bushel and peck are measurements for agricultural products; a peck is equivalent to eight dry quarts, while a bushel is four pecks. The terms appear at the start of each verse ("I love you a bushel and a peck") to mean greatly.

== History ==
The song was introduced in the Broadway musical Guys and Dolls, which opened at the 46th Street Theater on November 24, 1950. It was performed on stage by Vivian Blaine and a women's chorus as a nightclub act at the Hot Box. It is the first of two nightclub performances in the musical. Blaine later reprised her role as Miss Adelaide in the 1955 film version of the play, in which "A Bushel and a Peck" was omitted and replaced by a new song, "Pet Me, Poppa."

In the musical, the number can be performed either as "Miss Adelaide and her Chick Chick Chickadees", with the women dressed in yellow feathers, or as "Miss Adelaide and the Hot Box Farmerettes", where skimpy farmer outfits are worn (often jean cutoffs and checkered racing shirts or short gingham sundresses). The script calls the dancers the Farmerettes and describes the costume as "abbreviated Farmerette costumes with large hats and carrying rakes, hoes and pitchforks". During the original production, the dancers wore large Daisy barrettes, with loose petals behind permanent ones. When they sang "He loves me, he loves me not", they would throw the loose petals into the audience.

The second line of Loesser's song, "A bushel and a peck and a hug around the neck", can be found in a comedy-drama play The Miller's Daughter, or Bound in Honor mentioned as early as 1898 in The Scammon Miner of Scammon, Kansas. Numerous uses of that phrase can be found in letters to Santa as published in newspapers of the early 20th century.

== Recordings ==
A number of popular singers released recordings of "A Bushel and a Peck" while the musical was still in rehearsals.

The most popular recording was by Perry Como and Betty Hutton, made on September 12, 1950, and released by RCA Victor. It reached the Billboard chart on October 21, 1950, and lasted 18 weeks, where it peaked at number 3.

Another popular contemporary recording, made the day after the Como-Hutton one, was by Margaret Whiting and Jimmy Wakely recorded on September 13, 1950, and released by Capitol Records as Capitol 1042. The record reached the Billboard chart a week after the Como-Hutton version, on October 28, 1950, and lasted 15 weeks on the chart, peaking at number 6.

Doris Day's recording—also made on September 13, 1950, and released by Columbia Records as 78 rpm catalog number 39008 and 45 rpm catalog number 45-838—made the chart on November 4, 1950, for 8 weeks, peaking at number 16. Day's rendition of the song enjoyed a surge in popularity due to its usage in a television advertisement by State Farm Insurance in 2017.

Other 1950 recordings that charted were by The Andrews Sisters, (Decca 27252) charting on December 9, charting for four weeks, peaking at number 22, and Johnny Desmond, (MGM 10800) charting the same day for one week at number 29.

On December 9, all four recordings were on the Billboard chart.

On Cash Box's Best-Selling Record charts, where all versions of the song are combined, the song reached number 5 on December 2, 1950.

The song gained so much popularity before the musical actually opened that it was moved from its original spot at the start of the second act into the first act.

== Recorded versions ==
- The Andrews Sisters (1950)
- Perry Como and Betty Hutton (1950)
- Doris Day (1950)
- Johnny Desmond (1950)
- Connie Haines (1950)
- Margaret Whiting and Jimmy Wakely (1950)
- Vivian Blaine (1953)
- Frankie Laine and Jo Stafford (1953)
- Diahann Carroll "A" You're Adorable: Love Songs for Children (1965)
- Sharon, Lois & Bram: From In The Schoolyard (1981) TV recording (1987)
- Dan Zanes & Friends: Rocket Ship Beach (1990)
- Faith Prince Guys and Dolls Broadway revival cast recording (1992)
- VeggieTales Junior's Bedtime Songs (2002)
