= The Idyll of Miss Sarah Brown =

1933 short story by Damon Runyon

- Short story by Damon Runyon
- Country: United States
- Language: English

Publication
- Published in: Collier's Weekly
- Publication date: 1933

"The Idyll of Miss Sarah Brown" is a short story by Damon Runyon telling of the improbable—but eventually triumphant—love between an inveterate gambler (Sky Masterson) and a missionary girl (the Miss Sarah Brown of the title). It was the basis for the musical Guys and Dolls, with a similar plot, but with many twists added before the lovers are reunited and live happily ever after. It was first published in Collier's Weekly in 1933. In 1949, it was dramatized on radio as part of a program titled Damon Runyon Theatre.
