= Jimmy Randolph =

American singer (1934–2013)

James Randolph (February 21, 1934 – July 29, 2013) was an American singer of the 1960s. In 1976–1977, he took played the role of Sky Masterson in the Broadway revival of Guys and Dolls.

He made his Broadway debut in the New York City Opera company production of Carmen Jones playing the role of Huskie Miller. He next played Crown in the Vienna Volksoper production of Porgy and Bess, and since played the role more than 500 times in the United States and Europe. He starred in Ballad for Bimshire, and his other Broadway shows were To Broadway with Love, Free and Easy, and Jump for Joy. His television appearance included The Tonight Show, Merv Griffin, Jackie Gleason, Taxi, and Mary Tyler Moore Shows.

As a nightclub performer, he starred in his own show at the Riviera and Start Dust Hotels in Las Vegas and appeared at many other leading clubs and hotels in the United States, Europe, the Caribbean, Australia, and Africa.

For his 1981 album, Sophisticated Funk, he reinvented himself as a funk singer "Sir James", a reference to having been awarded Knight Commander of Liberia in 1958.

He died in Englewood, New Jersey, on July 29, 2013 at the age of 88.

== Discography ==
As "Sir James" Sophisticated Funk 1981

1. "Pure Love"
2. "Been Converted"
3. "Softly, Silently"
4. "Give Love To Get Love"
5. "Sho' Is Good"
6. "Pretty Face"
7. "Too Young"
8. "Burning On Down"
