= More I Cannot Wish You =

1950 song written by Frank Loesser

Song by Pat Rooney

from the album Guys and Dolls (Original Broadway Cast Recording)
- Released: 1950
- Recorded: 1950
- Genre: show tunes
- Length: 2:27
- Label: Decca
- Songwriter: Frank Loesser

"More I Cannot Wish You" is a song written and composed by Frank Loesser and first performed by Pat Rooney in 1950. The song was featured in the musical Guys and Dolls. The sentimental lyrics relate the feelings of the oldest character in the play, missionary Arvide Abernathy, who sings it tenderly to his granddaughter, Sarah Brown.

== Development ==
Loesser originally wrote the song for the 1949 movie Roseanna McCoy. In a scene in which the title character sat next to her elder brother in a wagon seat, her brother was to sing the song to her, "wishing her good fortune in the heart." When the song was cut from the movie, because producer Samuel Goldwyn "neither liked nor understood the song," Loesser added the song to Guys and Dolls.

To devise some of the singular lyrics, Loesser derived "with a sheep's eye" from "making sheep's eyes at" to describe "the imagined lover's almost pitiable adoration of the girl." For "lickerish tooth," Loesser consulted a thesaurus to find synonyms for "covetous" and found "lecherous," which was "appalling in sound to the modern ear," after which he consulted Oxford English Dictionary and saw "two archaic spellings"—"licorice" and "lickerish"—and "[i]n the exemplary material ... found 'lickerish tooth.'"

== Reception ==
Reviewing the original Broadway production of Guys and Dolls, Wolcott Gibbs wrote in The New Yorker that "More I Cannot Wish You" is "one of the pleasantest things in the show." The New York Daily News review said that "More I Cannot Wish You" "is worthy of Rooney's old, sure charm."

In his 1972 study of American popular songs, Alec Wilder described "More I Cannot Wish You" as "a very special song, shining with tenderness, as natural as if it simply happened," and called its lyrics "most distinguished and truly poetic."

== Notable recordings ==
- Paul McCartney recorded the song as a track on his album "Kisses on the Bottom" in 2012. McCartney’s version changes the lyrics slightly from "With a sheep’s eye / And a lickerish tooth" to "With a sheepish eye, / And a look of the truth." Describing his interpretation of the song, McCartney said, "It's a father talking to his daughter.... quite moving, very moving."
- Bing Crosby recorded the song as a single in 1951, and his recording appears on his album "Through the Years - Volume Two 1951." Crosby recorded another version with Jud Conlon’s Choir and John Scott Trotter And His Orchestra in 1953.
- Loudon Wainwright III recorded the song with Vince Giordano and the Nighthawks for his 2020 album "I'd Rather Lead a Band."
- Ed Ames recorded the song as the title track of an album in 1966.

== In popular culture ==
- The song appears in The Flash television series episode "Duet", performed by Jesse Martin featuring Victor Garber and John Barrowman.
- The song was omitted from the Guys and Dolls (1955) film adaptation, produced by Goldwyn, who had previously rejected the song for Roseanna McCoy.
