= Norma Donaldson =

American actress and singer from Harlem, New York

- Donaldson in Willie Dynamite, 1973
- Born: Norma C. Donaldson; August 18, 1928; New York City, U.S.
- Died: November 22, 1994 (aged 66); Los Angeles, California, U.S.
- Resting place: Inglewood Park Cemetery (Los Angeles, California)
- Education: Boys and Girls High School
- Occupations: Actress; singer
- Years active: 1956–1994

Norma Donaldson (August 18, 1928 – November 22, 1994) was an American actress and singer. She gained broad notoriety for her portrayal of Miss Adelaide in the 1976 Broadway revival of Guys and Dolls. Among her other credits, Donaldson had a recurring role on the CBS television soap opera The Young and the Restless as Lillie Belle Barber from 1990 to 1994.

== Early life ==
Born Norma C. Donaldson in the Harlem neighborhood of New York City, her parents were Laura, a housekeeper, and Fredrick Donaldson (b. 1906; d. 1955). The first of two children, Donaldson attended Boys and Girls High School (known at the time as Girls' High School), studying there until her junior year.

== Career ==
At age 21, Donaldson launched her career as a nightclub singer in 1949, booking gigs throughout New York City. During her nightclub stint, Donaldson began touring with Harry Belafonte and later Lena Horne.

Donaldson started her screen acting career in the late 1960s, first appearing in the March 8, 1969 episode of Callback!, with Barry Manilow as the show's music director. She also appeared in 1970s Blaxploitation films, most notably portraying Gloria Roberts in Across 110th Street (1972) and Honey in Willie Dynamite (1973).

Appearing on Broadway stages since 1957, Donaldson was most acclaimed for portraying the loveless chorus line dancer Miss Adelaide, opposite Robert Guillaume, in an all-black 1976 revival of Frank Loesser's Guys and Dolls. Donaldson later co-starred alongside Guillaume again in Purlie and No Place to be Somebody.

Prior to her lengthy recurring role on The Young and the Restless, she had played Dr. Pauline Ravelle on General Hospital between 1988 and 1990, who strove to prevent her daughter Simone from marrying the white Dr. Tom Hardy.

== Personal life and death ==
Donaldson never married nor had children. Donaldson died of cancer at Cedars Sinai Hospital in Los Angeles, California, on November 22, 1994, at 66 years old. She was buried at Inglewood Park Cemetery in Los Angeles, California.

== Filmography ==
=== Film ===
Year	Title	Role	Notes
1972	Across 110th Street	Gloria Roberts	
1973	Willie Dynamite	Honey	
1980	9 to 5	Betty	
1983	Staying Alive	Fatima	
1988	The Unholy	Abby	
1990	House Party	Mildred	
1991	The Five Heartbeats	Mrs. Sawyer	
1993	Poetic Justice	Aunt May	

=== Television ===
Year	Title	Role	Notes
1975	Good Times	Mrs. Baker	Episode: "Michael's Big Fall"
1975	The Jeffersons	Dale Parker	Episode: "George and the Manager"
1977	All in the Family	Ms. Watson	Episode: "Archie Gets the Business"
1978	What's Happening!!	Mrs. Miller	Episode: "No Clothes Make the Man"
1978	Watch Your Mouth	Mrs. Littlejohn	Episode: "Handsomest Boy"
1979	Archie Bunker's Place	Ms. Watson	Episodes: "Archie's New Partner: Parts 1 & 2", "The Cook"
1980	Willow B: Women in Prison	Mrs. McCallister	TV film
1981	Inmates: A Love Story	Lila	TV film
1982	CHiPs	Mrs. Schoonover	Episode: "Overload"
1982	Farrell for the People	Mrs. Grey	TV film
1983	Intimate Agony	Dr. Bryce	TV film
1988–1990	General Hospital	Dr. Pauline Ravelle	TV series
1989	Thirtysomething	Bernice	Episode: "No Promises"
1989	Matlock	Shirley Taylor	Episode: "The Good Boy"
1990–1994	The Young and the Restless	Lillie Belle Barber	Recurring role

== Theater ==
Year	Title	Role	Notes
1957	The Happiest Girl in the World	Martha	Broadway
1976	Guys and Dolls	Miss Adelaide	Broadway
