= Fugue for Tinhorns =

1950 song written by Frank Loesser

Song by Stubby Kaye, Johnny Silver, Douglas Deane

from the album Guys and Dolls (Original Broadway Cast Recording)
- Released: 1950
- Recorded: 1950
- Genre: show tunes
- Length: 1:43
- Label: Decca
- Songwriter: Frank Loesser

"Fugue for Tinhorns" is a song written and composed by Frank Loesser and first performed by Stubby Kaye, Johnny Silver, and Douglas Deane in 1950. The song was featured in the Broadway musical Guys and Dolls.

== Development ==
Twelve years before writing "Fugue for Tinhorns," Loesser was taken to a racetrack by Jule Styne, who said Loesser "was crazy about the racing form and the phrase 'can do' after a horse's name", which Styne said was Loesser's inspiration for the song.

Loesser originally called the song "Three Cornered Tune," and it was to be sung in Guys and Dolls by the characters Sarah Brown, Nathan Detroit, and Sky Masterson. As the play took shape, the characters singing the song were changed to Nicely-Nicely Johnson, Benny Southstreet, and Rusty Charlie, and the song was placed at the beginning of the show to establish context and tone.

The song also mentions Equipoise (1928–1938), a real-life Thoroughbred racehorse and stakes race champion of his time. While the racehorse "Epitaph" mentioned in the song's lyrics is fictional, the American Quarter Horse stallion and racehorse Go Man Go (1953–1983) was a great-grandson of Equipoise. Go Man Go was the World Champion Quarter Running Horse from 1955 to 1957, around the same time as the 1955 First Las Vegas and 1955 New York City Center revival productions of Guys and Dolls.

== Notable recordings ==
- The Andrews Sisters recorded the song as a single in 1953.
- Frank Sinatra, Bing Crosby, and Dean Martin recorded the song as a single in 1963.
- Herschel Bernardi recorded the song as a track on his 1970 album "Show Stopper."
- Barry Manilow recorded the song as part of a Guys and Dolls medley on his 1991 album "Showstoppers."
- Big Scoob sampled the song for his recording, "Can Du", in 2000.

== In popular culture ==
Film

- The song was included in the 1955 Guys and Dolls film adaptation.
- The song is sung several times in the 1984 film Oh, God! You Devil.
- The song plays over the opening and closing credits of the 1989 film Let It Ride.

Theatre

- The song is mentioned by Detective Cioffi in Act II, Scene 4 of Curtains, comparing its overlapping verses to the completed version of "In The Same Boat".
