= Thomas L. Riis =

- Born: October 6, 1950 (age 75); Boulder, Colorado
- Occupation: Musicologist
- Employer: University of Colorado Boulder

Thomas Laurence Riis (born October 6, 1950), better known as Thomas L. Riis, is an American musicologist and professor. His current position is the Joseph Negler Professor of Musicology and Director of the American Music Research Center at the College of Music, at the University of Colorado Boulder.

He received his bachelor's degree at Oberlin College and his master's degree and his doctorate from the University of Michigan. He has been on the faculty of the University of Colorado Boulder since 1992. He retired from teaching in 2018. In addition to his academic activities, Riis is active as a conductor, choral singer, viola player, and cellist.

His book Just Before Jazz, devoted to African-American Broadway shows, received an ASCAP-Deems Taylor Award in 1995.

== Books ==
- Just Before Jazz : Black musical theater in New York, 1890-1915 (Washington: Smithsonian Institution Press, 1989) ISBN 9780874747881
- More Than Just Minstrel Shows: the Rise of Black Musical Theatre at the Turn of the Century (New York: Institute for Studies in American Music, Conservatory of Music, Brooklyn College of the City University of New York, 1992) ISBN 9780914678366
- Frank Loesser (New Haven: Yale University Press, 2008) ISBN 9780300110517
