= Guys and Dolls =

1950 musical by Frank Loesser, Jo Swerling, and Abe Burrows

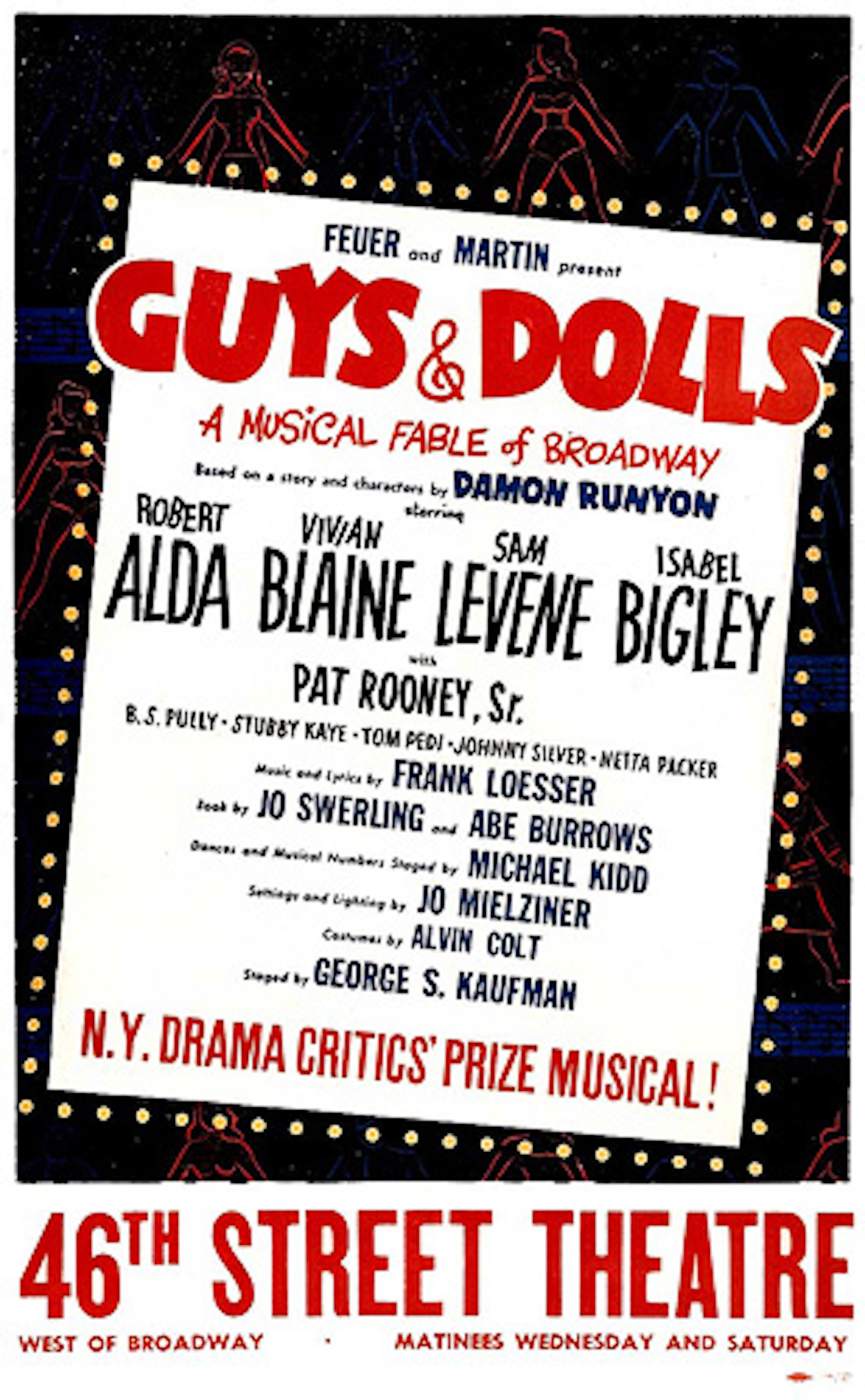
- Guys and Dolls window card starring Vivian Blaine, Robert Alda and Sam Levene from original 1950 Broadway production at the 46th Street Theatre
- Music: Frank Loesser
- Lyrics: Frank Loesser
- Book: Jo Swerling; Abe Burrows
- Basis: "The Idyll of Miss Sarah Brown" by Damon Runyon "Blood Pressure" by Damon Runyon
- Productions: 1950 Broadway; 1953 West End; 1976 Broadway revival; 1982 London; 1984 West End revival; 1992 Broadway revival; 2005 West End revival; 2009 Broadway revival; 2015 West End revival; 2023 London revival
- Awards: Tony Award for Best Musical; Tony Award for Best Book (1982) Olivier for Outstanding Musical; Tony Award for Best Revival; Drama Desk Outstanding Revival (2005) Olivier for Outstanding Musical

Guys and Dolls is a musical with music and lyrics by Frank Loesser and book by Jo Swerling and Abe Burrows. It is based on "The Idyll of Miss Sarah Brown" (1933) and "Blood Pressure", which are two short stories by Damon Runyon, and also borrows characters and plot elements from other Runyon stories, such as "Pick the Winner".

The show premiered on Broadway on November 24, 1950, where it ran for 1,200 performances and won the Tony Award for Best Musical. The musical has had several revivals on both Broadway and the West End, as well as a 1955 film adaptation starring Frank Sinatra, Marlon Brando, Jean Simmons, and Vivian Blaine, who reprised her role of Adelaide from Broadway.

Guys and Dolls is considered one of the greatest Broadway musicals. In 1998, Vivian Blaine, Sam Levene, Robert Alda and Isabel Bigley, along with the original Broadway cast of the 1950 Decca cast album, were inducted into the Grammy Hall of Fame.

== Background ==
Guys and Dolls was conceived by producers Cy Feuer and Ernest Martin as an adaptation of Damon Runyon's short stories. These stories, written in the 1920s and 1930s, concerned gangsters, gamblers, and other characters of the New York underworld. Runyon was known for the unique comic dialect he employed in his stories; mixing highly formal language, without contractions, and colorful slang. Frank Loesser, who had spent most of his career as a lyricist for movie musicals, was hired as composer and lyricist. George S. Kaufman was hired as director. When the first version of the show's book, or dialogue, written by Jo Swerling was deemed unusable, Feuer and Martin asked radio comedy writer Abe Burrows to rewrite it.

Loesser had already written much of the score to correspond with the first version of the book. Burrows later recalled:

Frank Loesser's fourteen songs were all great, and the [new book] had to be written so that the story would lead into each of them. Later on, the critics spoke of the show as 'integrated'. The word integration usually means that the composer has written songs that follow the story line gracefully. Well, we accomplished that but we did it in reverse.

Abe Burrows specifically crafted the role of Nathan Detroit around Sam Levene who signed for the project long before Burrows wrote a single word of dialogue, a similar break Burrows said he had when he later wrote Cactus Flower for Lauren Bacall. In "Honest, Abe: Is There Really No Business Like Show Business?", Burrows recalls "I had the sound of their voices in my head. I knew the rhythm of their speech and it helped make the dialogue sharper and more real". Although Broadway and movie veteran Sam Levene was not a singer, it was agreed he was otherwise perfect as Nathan Detroit; indeed, Levene was one of Runyon's favorite actors. Frank Loesser agreed it was easier adjusting the music to Levene's limitations than substituting a better singer who couldn't act. Levene's lack of singing ability is the reason the lead role of Nathan Detroit only has one song, the duet "Sue Me".

Composer and lyricist Frank Loesser specifically wrote "Sue Me" for Sam Levene, and structured the song so he and Vivian Blaine never sang their showstopping duet together. The son of a cantor, Sam Levene was fluent in Yiddish: "Alright, already, I'm just a no-goodnick; alright, already, it's true, so nu? So sue me." Frank Loesser felt "Nathan Detroit should be played as a brassy Broadway tough guy who sang with more grits than gravy. Sam Levene sang "Sue Me" with such a wonderful Runyonesque flavor that his singing had been easy to forgive, in fact it had been quite charming in its ineptitude." "Musically, Sam Levene may have been tone-deaf, but he inhabited Frank Loesser's world as a character more than a caricature", says Larry Stempel, a music professor at Fordham University and the author of Showtime: A History of the Broadway Musical Theater.

The character of Miss Adelaide was created specifically to fit Vivian Blaine into the musical, after Loesser decided she was ill-suited to play the conservative Sarah. When Loesser suggested reprising some songs in the second act, Kaufman warned: "If you reprise the songs, we'll reprise the jokes."

== Characters ==
- Sky Masterson
- Sarah Brown
- Nathan Detroit
- Miss Adelaide
- Nicely Nicely Johnson
- Benny Southstreet
- Arvide Abernathy
- Rusty Charlie
- General Cartwright
- Lieutenant Brannigan
- Harry The Horse
- Big Jule
- Angie The Ox
- Master of Ceremonies
- Mimi
- Agatha
- Calvin
- Martha
- Liver Lips Louie
- Ensemble

== Synopsis ==
=== Act I ===
A pantomime of never-ceasing activities depicts the hustle and bustle of New York City ("Runyonland"). Three small-time gamblers, Nicely-Nicely Johnson, Benny Southstreet, and Rusty Charlie, argue over which horse will win a big race ("Fugue for Tinhorns"). The band members of the Save-a-Soul Mission, led by the pious and beautiful Sergeant Sarah Brown, call for sinners to "Follow the Fold" and repent ("Follow the Fold"). Nicely and Benny's employer, Nathan Detroit, runs an illegal floating craps game. Due to local policeman Lt. Brannigan's strong-armed presence, he has found only one likely spot to hold the game: the "Biltmore garage". Its owner, Joey Biltmore requires a $1,000 security deposit, and Nathan is broke ("The Oldest Established"). Nathan hopes to win a $1,000 bet against Sky Masterson, a notoriously lucky gambler willing to bet on virtually anything. Nathan proposes a bet he believes he cannot lose: Sky must take a woman of Nathan's choice to dinner in Havana, Cuba. Sky agrees, and Nathan chooses Sarah Brown.

At the mission, Sky attempts to make a deal with Sarah; offering her "one dozen genuine sinners" in exchange for the date in Havana. Sarah refuses, and they argue over whom they will fall in love with ("I'll Know"). Sky kisses Sarah, and she slaps him. Nathan goes to watch his fiancée of 14 years, Adelaide, perform her nightclub act ("A Bushel and a Peck"). After her show, she asks him to marry her once again, telling him that she has been sending her mother letters for twelve years claiming that they have been married with five children. She finds out that Nathan is still running the craps game. After kicking him out, she reads a medical book telling her that her long-running cold may be due to Nathan's refusal to marry her ("Adelaide's Lament").

The next day, Nicely and Benny watch as Sky pursues Sarah, and Nathan tries to win back Adelaide's favor. They declare that guys will do anything for the women they love ("Guys and Dolls"). General Cartwright, the leader of Save-a-Soul, visits the mission and explains that she will be forced to close the branch unless they succeed in bringing some sinners to the upcoming revival meeting. Sarah, desperate to save the mission, promises the General "one dozen genuine sinners", implicitly accepting Sky's deal. Brannigan discovers a group of gamblers waiting for Nathan's craps game, and to convince him of their innocence, they tell Brannigan their gathering is Nathan's "surprise bachelor party". This satisfies Brannigan, and Nathan resigns himself to eloping with Adelaide. Adelaide goes home to pack, promising to meet him after her show the next afternoon. The Save-A-Soul Mission band passes by, and Nathan sees that Sarah is not in it; he realizes that he lost the bet and faints.

In a Havana nightclub, Sky buys a "Cuban milkshake" for himself and Sarah, which contains Bacardi rum. After a long dance sequence ("Havana"), a fight breaks out in the nightclub, and they flee. Outside, a drunk Sarah kisses Sky ("If I Were a Bell"). Sky realizes that he genuinely cares for Sarah, and he takes her back to New York. They return at around 4:00 a.m., and Sky tells Sarah how much he loves the early morning ("My Time of Day"). They both spontaneously admit that they're in love ("I've Never Been in Love Before"). A siren sounds and gamblers run out of the Mission, where Nathan has been holding the craps game. Sarah assumes that Sky took her to Havana so Nathan could run the game in the mission, and she walks out on him.

=== Act II ===
The next evening, Adelaide performs her act ("Take Back Your Mink"). Afterwards, Nicely and Sky inform her that Nathan once again will not be making an appearance. Adelaide and Sky argue about their respective relationships and their outlooks on life. He leaves, and she sadly reflects on Nathan standing her up again ("Adelaide's Second Lament").

Back in the Mission, Sarah admits to Arvide and Martha that she does love Sky, but she will not see him again. Arvide, her grandfather and fellow mission worker, expresses his faith in Sky's inherent goodness and urges Sarah to follow her heart ("More I Cannot Wish You"). Sky arrives and tells Sarah he intends to deliver the dozen genuine sinners for the revival, but she rebukes him and walks off. Arvide subtly encourages Sky, who leaves and finds Nicely. Nicely shows Sky to the craps game, which has now moved to the sewers to hide ("The Crapshooters' Dance"). After playing for twenty-four hours, most of the gamblers are tired, but Big Jule, a gambler from Chicago, has lost a large sum of money and refuses to end the game until he earns it back.

Sky arrives and fails to convince the crapshooters to come to the mission. He gives Nathan $1,000 and claims that he lost the bet. After a comment made by one of the gamblers inspires him, Sky formulates a last-minute bet to get the sinners: if he loses, everyone gets $1,000, but if he wins, they visit to the mission one time. He wins the bet ("Luck Be a Lady"). On the way to the Mission, Nathan runs into Adelaide. She tries to convince him to elope, but when he says he has to go to a prayer meeting, Adelaide becomes angry, believing Nathan is lying to her. Nathan finally professes his love for her ("Sue Me") and leaves.

Sarah is shocked to see that Sky carried through on his promise. The General asks the gamblers to confess their sins, and while some offer sarcastic confessions, one of them admits that Sky's bet is the only reason why the gamblers came to the meeting. The General is thrilled that good can come from evil. Attempting to appear contrite during his confession, Nicely invents a dream that encouraged him to repent, and the gamblers join in with revivalist fervor ("Sit Down, You're Rockin' the Boat"). Brannigan arrives and threatens to arrest everyone for the craps game in the Mission, but Sarah clears them, saying that none of the gamblers were at the mission the previous night. After Brannigan leaves, Nathan confesses that they held the craps game in the mission and apologizes. He also confesses to the bet he made with Sky about taking Sarah to Havana, adding that he won the bet, to Sarah's shock. She realizes that Sky wanted to protect her reputation and must genuinely care about her. Afterwards, Sarah and Adelaide run into each other and commiserate. After Sarah mentions Nathan was at the prayer meeting, Adelaide realizes Nathan was telling the truth. The two women eventually decide they want to marry their men as soon as possible and reform their negative qualities afterward ("Marry the Man Today").

A few weeks later, Nathan owns a newsstand and has officially closed the craps game at Adelaide's behest. Sky, who is now married to Sarah, works in the Mission band and has also stopped gambling. The characters celebrate as Nathan and Adelaide are married ("Guys and Dolls (Finale/Reprise)").

== Musical numbers ==
Act I

- "Runyonland" – Orchestra
- "Fugue for Tinhorns" – Nicely-Nicely Johnson, Benny Southstreet, Rusty Charlie
- "Follow the Fold" – Sarah Brown, Mission Band
- "The Oldest Established" – Nathan Detroit, Nicely, Benny, Guys
- "I'll Know" – Sarah, Sky Masterson
- "A Bushel and a Peck" – Miss Adelaide, Hot Box Girls
- "Adelaide's Lament" – Adelaide
- "Guys and Dolls" – Nicely, Benny
- "Havana" – Orchestra
- "If I Were a Bell" – Sarah
- "My Time of Day/I've Never Been in Love Before" – Sky, Sarah

Act II

- "Take Back Your Mink" – Adelaide, Hot Box Girls
- "Adelaide's Second Lament" – Adelaide
- "More I Cannot Wish You" – Arvide Abernathy
- "The Crapshooters' Dance" – Orchestra
- "Luck Be a Lady" – Sky, Guys
- "Sue Me" – Adelaide, Nathan
- "Sit Down, You're Rockin' the Boat" – Nicely, Company
- "Marry the Man Today" – Adelaide, Sarah
- "Guys and Dolls (Reprise)" – Company

== Productions ==
=== Original 1950 Broadway production ===
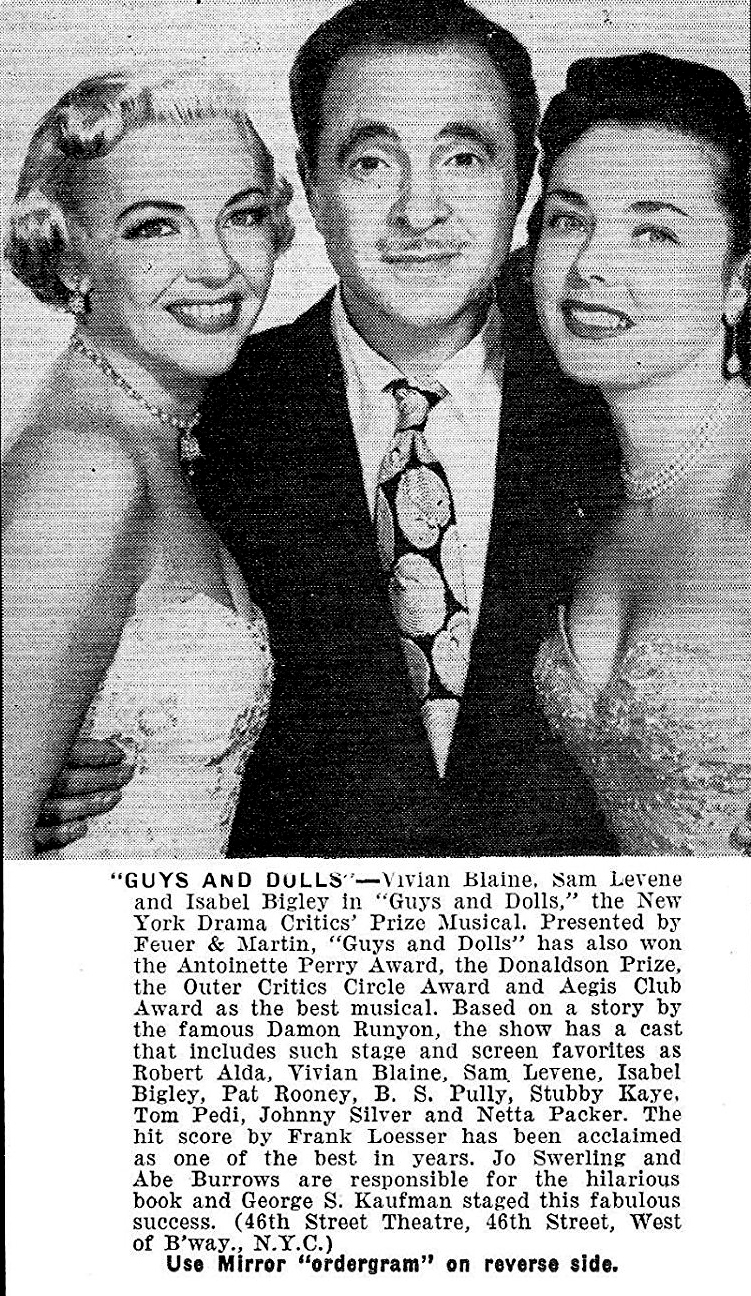
New York Mirror "Theatre-Ticket Ordergram" featuring original Broadway stars Vivian Blaine, Sam Levene and Isabel Bigley in 1950 Broadway production Guys and Dolls at 46th Street Theatre

The show had its pre-Broadway try-out at the Shubert Theater in Philadelphia, opening Saturday, October 14, 1950. The musical premiered on Broadway at the 46th Street Theatre (now Richard Rodgers Theatre) on November 24, 1950. It was directed by George S. Kaufman, with dances and musical numbers by Michael Kidd, scenic and lighting design by Jo Mielziner, costumes by Alvin Colt, and orchestrations by George Bassman and Ted Royal, with vocal arrangements by Herbert Greene. It starred Robert Alda (Sky Masterson), Sam Levene (Nathan Detroit), Isabel Bigley (Sarah) and Vivian Blaine (Miss Adelaide). Iva Withers was a replacement as Miss Adelaide. The musical ran for 1,200 performances, winning five 1951 Tony Awards, including the award for Best Musical. Decca Records issued the original cast recording on 78 rpm records, which was later expanded and re-issued on LP, and then transferred to CD in the 1980s.

=== 1953: First UK production ===
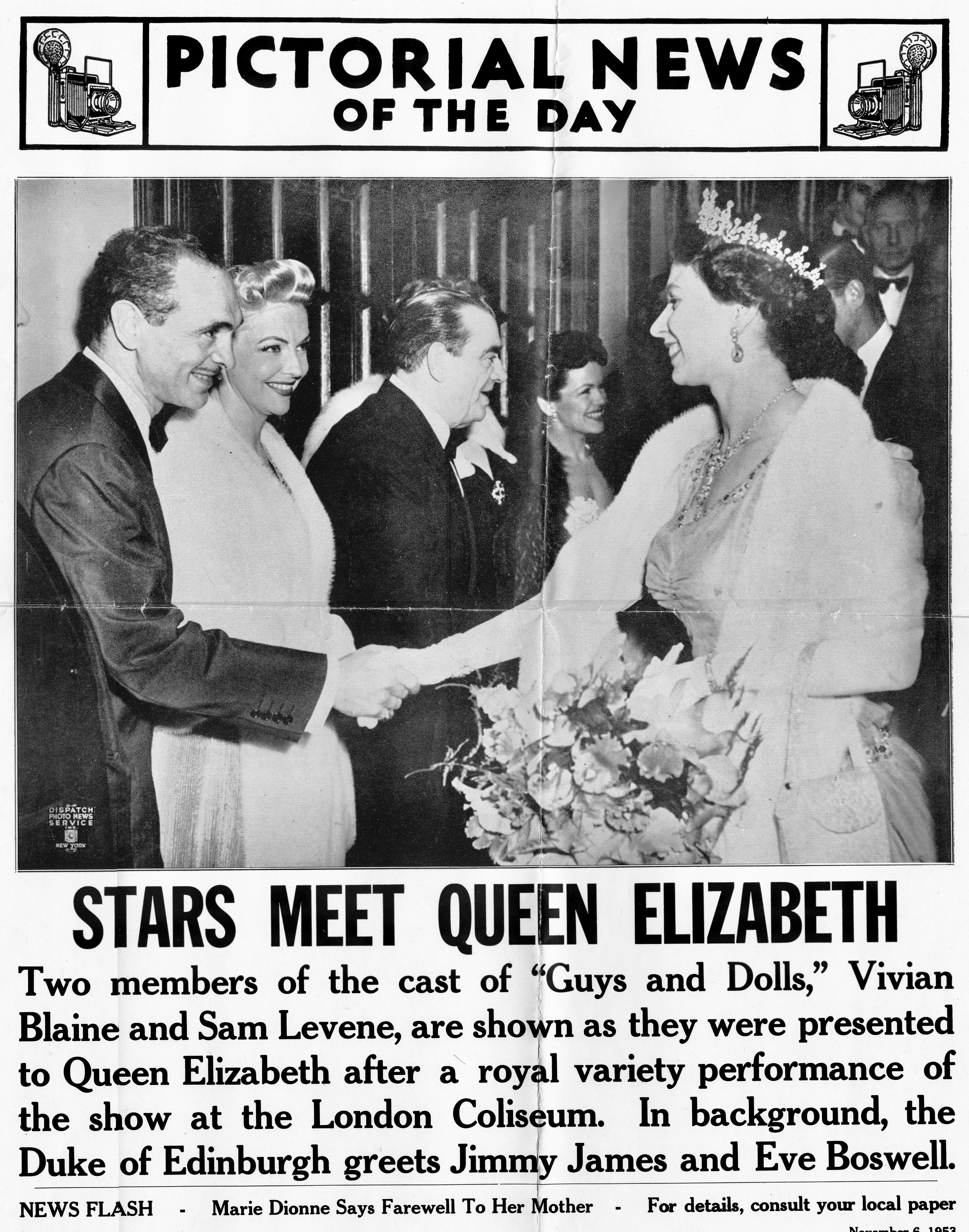
Vivian Blaine and Sam Levene meet Queen Elizabeth after a Royal Command Variety Performance of Guys and Dolls on November 2, 1953

The premiere West End production of Guys and Dolls opened at the London Coliseum on May 28, 1953, a few days before the 1953 Coronation and ran for 555 performances, including a Royal Command Variety Performance for Queen Elizabeth on November 2, 1953. Credited with above-the-title-billing the London cast co-starred Vivian Blaine as Miss Adelaide and Sam Levene as Nathan Detroit, each reprising their original Broadway performances; Jerry Wayne performed the role of Sky Masterson since Robert Alda did not reprise his Broadway role in the first UK production which co-starred Lizbeth Webb as Sarah Brown. Before opening at the Coliseum, Guys and Dolls had an eight performance run at the Bristol Hippodrome, where the show opened on May 19, 1953, and closed on May 25, 1953. Lizbeth Webb was the only major principal who was British and was chosen to play the part of Sarah Brown by Frank Loesser. The show has had numerous revivals and tours and has become a popular choice for school and community theatre productions.

=== 1955 First Las Vegas production ===
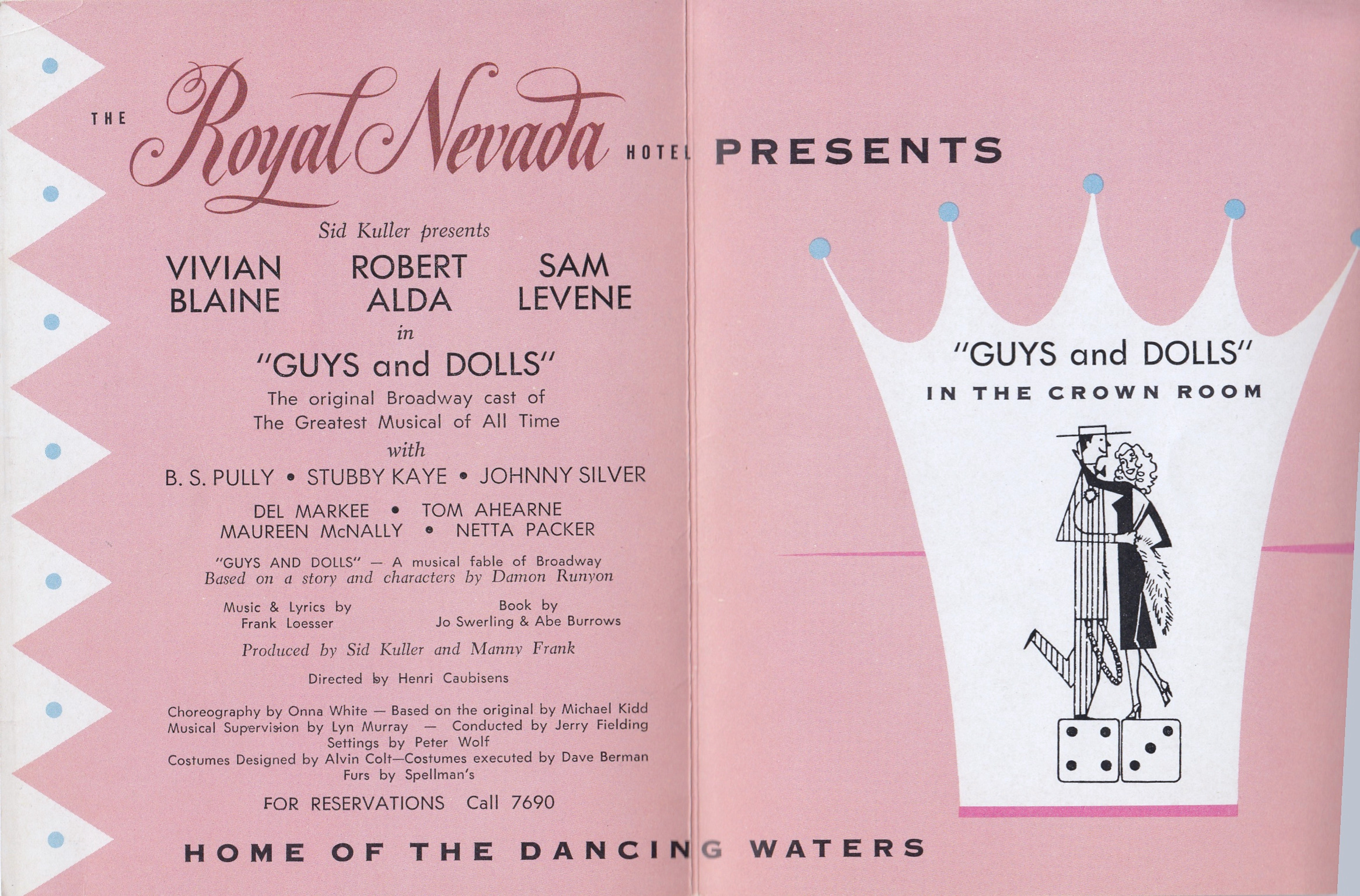
Guys and Dolls program from 1st Las Vegas production which opened September 7, 1955, at the Royal Nevada, performed twice daily starring Vivian Blaine, Robert Alda and Sam Levene, each reprising their original Broadway performances

Vivian Blaine as Miss Adelaide, Sam Levene as Nathan Detroit and Robert Alda as Sky Masterson recreated their original Broadway performances twice daily in a slightly reduced version of Guys and Dolls when the first Las Vegas production opened a six-month run at the Royal Nevada, September 7, 1955, the first time a Broadway musical was performed on the Las Vegas Strip.

=== 1965 Fifteenth Anniversary production ===
In 1965 Vivian Blaine and Sam Levene reprised their original Broadway roles as Miss Adelaide and Nathan Detroit in a 15th anniversary revival of Guys and Dolls at the Mineola Theatre, Mineola, New York and Paramus Playhouse, New Jersey. Blaine and Levene performed the fifteenth anniversary production of Guys and Dolls for a limited run of 24 performances at each theatre.

=== NYC Center 1955, 1965-66 revivals ===
New York City Center mounted short runs of the musical in 1955, 1965 and 1966. A production starring Walter Matthau as Nathan Detroit, Helen Gallagher as Adelaide, Ray Shaw as Sky and Leila Martin as Sarah had 31 performances, running from April 20 to May 1, and May 31 to June 12, 1955.

Another presentation at City Center, with Alan King as Nathan Detroit, Sheila MacRae as Adelaide, Jerry Orbach as Sky and Anita Gillette as Sarah, ran for 15 performances from April 28 to May 9, 1965. A 1966 production, starring Jan Murray as Nathan Detroit, Vivian Blaine reprising her role as Adelaide, Hugh O'Brian as Sky, and Barbara Meister as Sarah, ran for 23 performances, from June 8 to June 26, 1966.

=== 1976 Broadway revival ===
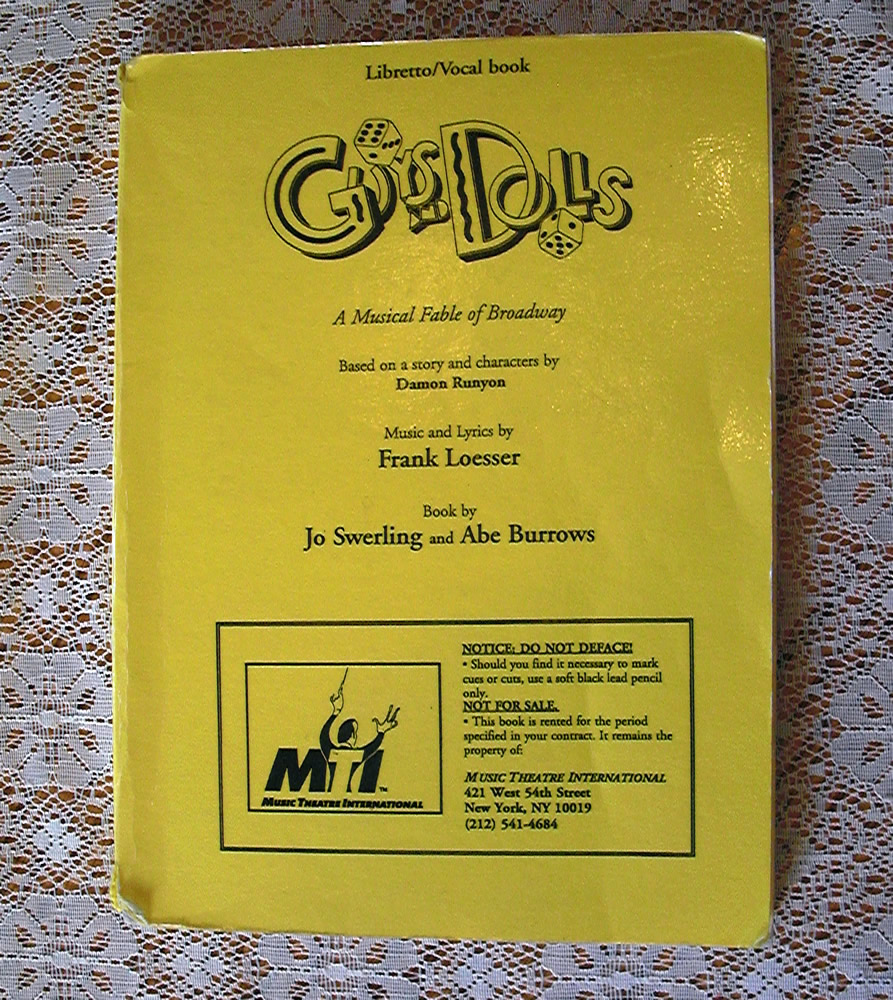
Libretto and vocal book, Music Theatre International (1978), rented out to actors

An all-black cast staged the first Broadway revival of Guys and Dolls opened on July 10, 1976, in previews, officially on July 21, at The Broadway Theatre. It starred Robert Guillaume as Nathan Detroit, Norma Donaldson as Miss Adelaide, Jimmy Randolph as Sky, Ernestine Jackson as Sarah Brown, and Ken Page as Nicely-Nicely Johnson. Guillaume and Jackson were nominated for Tony and Drama Desk Awards, and Page won a Theatre World Award.

This production featured Motown-style musical arrangements by Danny Holgate and Horace Ott, and it was directed and choreographed by Billy Wilson. The entire production was under the supervision of Abe Burrows, and musical direction and choral arrangements were by Howard Roberts.

The show closed on February 13, 1977, after 12 previews and 239 performances. A cast recording was released subsequent to the show's opening.

=== 1982 London; 1984 West End revival ===
Laurence Olivier wanted to play Nathan Detroit, and began rehearsals for a planned 1971 London revival of Guys and Dolls for the National Theatre Company then based at the Old Vic. However, due to poor health he had to stop, and his revival never happened.

In 1982, Richard Eyre directed a major revival at London's National Theatre. Eyre called it a "re-thinking" of the musical, and his production featured a neon-lit set design inspired by Rudi Stern's 1979 book Let There Be Neon, and brassier orchestrations with vintage yet innovative harmonies. The show's choreography by David Toguri included a large-scale tap dance in the finale, performed by the principals and entire cast. The revival opened March 9, 1982, and was an overnight sensation, running for nearly four years and breaking box office records. The original cast featured Bob Hoskins as Nathan Detroit, Julia McKenzie as Adelaide, Ian Charleson as Sky and Julie Covington as Sarah. The production won five Olivier Awards, including Best Musical.

Replacements in the cast included Trevor Peacock as Nathan, Paul Jones as Sky, Belinda Sinclair and Fiona Hendley as Sarah, and Imelda Staunton as Adelaide. The production closed in late 1983. Eyre's production returned to the National from April through September 1984, this time starring Lulu, Norman Rossington, Clarke Peters and Betsy Brantley. After a nationwide tour, the production transferred to the West End at the Prince of Wales Theatre, where it ran from June 1985 to April 1986. Following Ian Charleson's death from AIDS in 1990 two reunion performances of Guys and Dolls, with almost all of the original 1982 cast and musicians, were given at the National Theatre as a tribute to him. The tickets sold out immediately, and the dress rehearsal was also packed. The proceeds were donated to the Ian Charleson Day Centre HIV clinic at the Royal Free Hospital, and to scholarships in Charleson's name at LAMDA.

=== 1992 Broadway revival ===
DVD cover of the 1992 cast-album recording documentary, Guys and Dolls: Off the Record, starring Peter Gallagher, Josie de Guzman, Nathan Lane, and Faith Prince

The 1992 Broadway revival was the most successful American remounting of the show since the original Broadway production which ran for 1,200 performances. Directed by Jerry Zaks, it starred Nathan Lane as Nathan Detroit (from whom Lane had taken his stage name), Peter Gallagher as Sky, Faith Prince as Adelaide and Josie de Guzman as Sarah. This production played at the Martin Beck Theatre from April 14, 1992, to January 8, 1995, with 1,143 performances.

The production received a rave review from Frank Rich in The New York Times, stating "It's hard to know which genius, and I do mean genius, to celebrate first while cheering the entertainment at the Martin Beck." It received eight Tony Award nominations, and won four, including Best Revival, and the show also won the Drama Desk Award for Outstanding Revival. This revival featured various revisions to the show's score, including brand new music for the "Runyonland", "A Bushel and a Peck", "Take Back Your Mink" and "Havana". The orchestrations were redesigned by Michael Starobin, and there were new dance arrangements added to "A Bushel and a Peck" and "Take Back Your Mink".

A one-hour documentary film captured the recording sessions of the production's original cast album. Titled Guys and Dolls: Off the Record, the film aired on PBS's Great Performances series in December 1992, and was released on DVD in 2007. Complete takes of most of the show's songs are featured, as well as coaching from director Zaks, and commentary sessions by stars Gallagher, de Guzman, Lane and Prince on the production and their characters.

Lorna Luft auditioned for the role of Adelaide in this production. Faith Prince ultimately played the role, and Luft later played the role in the 1992 National Tour.

=== 1996 London revival ===
Richard Eyre repeated his 1982 success with another National Theatre revival of the show, this time in a limited run. It starred Henry Goodman as Nathan Detroit, Imelda Staunton returning as Adelaide, Clarke Peters returning as Sky and Joanna Riding as Sarah. Clive Rowe played Nicely-Nicely Johnson, and David Toguri returned as choreographer. The production ran from December 17, 1996, through March 29, 1997 and from July 2, 1997, to November 22, 1997. It received three Olivier Award nominations, winning one: Best Supporting Performance in a Musical went to Clive Rowe. Richard Eyre won the Critics' Circle Theatre Award for Best Director, and the production won Best Musical.

=== 2005 West End revival ===
The 2005 West End revival opened at London's Piccadilly Theatre in June 2005 and closed in April 2007. This revival, directed by Michael Grandage, starred Ewan McGregor as Sky, Jenna Russell as Sarah, Jane Krakowski as Adelaide, and Douglas Hodge as Nathan Detroit. During the run, Nigel Harman, Adam Cooper, Norman Bowman and Ben Richards took over as Sky; Kelly Price, Amy Nuttall and Lisa Stokke took over as Sarah; Sarah Lancashire, Sally Ann Triplett, Claire Sweeney, Lynsey Britton and Samantha Janus took over as Adelaide; and Nigel Lindsay, Neil Morrissey, Patrick Swayze, Alex Ferns and Don Johnson took over as Nathan Detroit. This production added the song "Adelaide" that Frank Loesser wrote for the 1955 film adaptation. According to a September 2007 article in Playbill, this West End production was scheduled to begin previews for a transfer to Broadway in February 2008, but this plan was dropped.

=== 2009 Broadway revival ===
A Broadway revival of the show opened on March 1, 2009, at the Nederlander Theatre. The cast included Oliver Platt as Nathan Detroit, Lauren Graham, in her Broadway debut, as Adelaide, Craig Bierko as Sky and Kate Jennings Grant as Sarah. Des McAnuff was the director, and the choreographer was Sergio Trujillo. This version of the show moved the setting from the 1950s to the 1940s and added Damon Runyon himself as a non-speaking character. The show opened to generally negative reviews. The New York Times called it "static" and "uninspired", the New York Post said, "How can something so zippy be so tedious?" and Time Out New York wrote, "Few things are more enervating than watching good material deflate." However, the show received a highly favorable review from The New Yorker, and the producers decided to keep the show open in hopes of positive audience response. The New York Post reported on March 4 that producer Howard Panter "[said] he'll give Guys and Dolls at least seven weeks to find an audience". The revival closed on June 14, 2009, after 28 previews and 113 performances.

=== 2015 London revival ===
A new production directed by Gordon Greenberg was originally presented at Chichester Festival Theatre in Summer 2014 before moving the Savoy Theatre on December 10, 2015, for previews with a full opening on January 6, 2016, running until March 12, 2016 (following preview runs at the Palace Theatre, Manchester and Alexandra Theatre, Birmingham in November 2015). The production starred David Haig as Nathan, Sophie Thompson as Adelaide, Jamie Parker as Sky, Siubhan Harrison as Sarah and Gavin Spokes as Nicely. The production then transferred to the Phoenix Theatre, with Oliver Tompsett as Sky, Samantha Spiro as Adelaide, Billy Boyle as Arvide, and Richard Kind as Nathan. On June 28, 2016, the role of Miss Adelaide was taken over by Rebel Wilson, and Nathan Detroit was played by Simon Lipkin. The production also toured around UK cities and Dublin starring Maxwell Caulfield as Nathan, Louise Dearman as Miss Adelaide, Richard Fleeshman as Sky and Anna O'Byrne as Sarah.

=== 2017 UK all-black production ===
Talawa Theatre Company and Manchester's Royal Exchange Theatre produced the UK's first all-black Guys and Dolls in 2017. The production opened on December 2, 2017, and following an extension ran to February 27, 2018, at the Royal Exchange in Manchester. The cast included Ray Fearon as Nathan Detroit, Ashley Zhangazha as Sky Masterson, Abiona Omonua as Sarah Brown, and Lucy Vandi as Miss Adelaide.

In this production, the musical was relocated to Harlem, 1939, with the music referencing jazz, and gospel. Director Michael Buffong said, "Pre-war Harlem was all about the hustle. The creativity of that era was born from a unique collision of talent and circumstance as people escaped the agricultural and oppressive south via the 'underground railroad' into the highly urbanised and industrialised north. Much of our popular culture, from dance to music, has its roots in that period. Our Guys and Dolls brings all of this to the fore."

Reviews particularly praised the music, relocation to Harlem, and sense of spectacle. Lyn Gardner in The Guardian wrote that "the gamblers ... are a bunch of sharp-suited peacocks clad in rainbow hues." Ann Treneman in The Times commented, "Whoever had the idea of moving this classic musical from one part of New York to another bit, just up the road, needs to be congratulated. This version of Frank Loesser's musical, which swirls around the lives of the petty gangsters and their 'dolls' who inhabit New York's underbelly, moves the action to Harlem at its prewar height in 1939. It is a Talawa production with an all-black cast and it is terrific from the get-go." Clare Brennan in The Observer stated, "Relocated to Harlem, this fine new production of Frank Loesser's classic musical retains a threat of violence under a cartoon-bright exterior."

=== 2023 London revival ===
A new revival directed by Nicholas Hytner, choreographed by Arlene Phillips and James Cousins and designed by Bunny Christie began previews at the Bridge Theatre in London on March 3, 2023, with an opening night on March 14. Similar to Hytner's productions of Julius Caesar and A Midsummer Night's Dream at the Bridge, the production had an immersive in-the-round staging where audience members in the pit stood and the stage platforms would rise around them involving audience participation. The cast included Daniel Mays as Nathan Detroit, Celinde Schoenmaker as Sarah Brown, Marisha Wallace as Miss Adelaide, Andrew Richardson as Sky Masterson and Cedric Neal as Nicely Nicely Johnson.

A new cast recording was released digitally on September 29, 2023, and was physically released on October 27, 2023, by Broadway Records. This album features several bonus tracks including a pop remix of "Luck Be A Lady", sung by Marisha Wallace, which is played after the curtain call and the Hi-Hi Boys' (Cedric Neal with Simon Anthony, Jordan Castle, Ryan Pidgen) versions of "I'll Know", "I've Never Been in Love Before" and "If I Were A Bell" which is performed during the interval.

Owain Arthur took over from Mays as Nathan Detroit from July 17 to October 14, 2023 while Mays undertook filming commitments before returning to the role on October 16 with George Ioannides replacing Richardson as Sky Masterson. From February 28, 2024, a new cast took over including Arthur returning as Nathan Detroit, Timmika Ramsay as Miss Adelaide, Jonathan Andrew Hume as Nicely Nicely Johnson with Schoenmaker and Ioannides remaining as Sarah Brown and Sky Masterson. Gina Beck took over from Schoenmaker as Sarah Brown from 2 September 2024. Following numerous extensions due to popular demand, the production closed at the Bridge Theatre on January 4, 2025.

=== Other productions ===
- In 1984, the first Japanese production by all-female theatre troupe Takarazuka Revue opened in December 9 and ran to March 31 in both Tokyo and Takarazuka Grand Theater; it featured Moon Troupe's Mao Daichi and Hitomi Kuroki. It was performed again in 2002 (featuring Moon Troupe's Jun Shibuki and Kurara Emi) and in 2015 (featuring Star Troupe's Kairi Hokushou and Fuu Hinami).
- In 1985, an Australian production was staged, starring Anthony Warlow as Sky, Peter Adams as Nathan, and Angela Ayers as Sarah.
- In 1985, a production at the Seattle Repertory Theatre was staged, starring Davis Gaines as Sky Masterson, Faith Prince as Miss Adelaide, J. K. Simmons as Lieutenant Brannigan, and Chad Henry as Rusty Charlie.
- In 1995, a Las Vegas production, performed without intermission, starred Jack Jones, Maureen McGovern and Frank Gorshin.
- On December 30, 1999, a Washington's Arena Stage production was staged under the Charles Randolph-Wright direction, starring Maurice Hines (Nathan Detroit) and Alexandra Foucard (Adelaide), opening on December 30. The production received six Helen Hayes Award nominations. With support from Jo Sullivan Loesser, the production began a national tour in August 2001. The cast recording from this production, released in November 2001, was nominated for the Grammy Award for Best Musical Show Album.
- On April 5, 2008, an Australian remount of the Michael Grandage West End production of Guys and Dolls opened in Melbourne. The show starred Lisa McCune, Marina Prior, Garry McDonald, Ian Stenlake, Shane Jacobson, Wayne Scott Kermond, and Magda Szubanski, and ran at the Princess Theatre. The Melbourne season closed in August 2008 and transferred to Sydney from March 13, 2009, to May 31, 2009, at the Capitol Theatre, retaining the Melbourne cast.
- In October 2008, a concert version was performed at the Hilbert Circle Theatre. It starred Gary Beach as Nathan, Hugh Panaro as Sky, Ashley Brown as Sarah, Hal Linden as Arvide, Megan Lawrence as Adelaide, and Joe Cassidy as Nicely.
- In August 2009, a concert version ran at The Hollywood Bowl, Hollywood, California, starring Scott Bakula (Nathan Detroit), Brian Stokes Mitchell (Sky Masterson), Ellen Greene (Miss Adelaide), Ken Page (Nicely-Nicely Johnson), Jessica Biel (Sarah Brown) and Ruth Williamson (Matilda Cartwright).
- In February 2011, a co-production between Clwyd Theatr Cymru, the New Wolsey Theatre and the Salisbury Playhouse opened at Clwyd Theatr. Directed by Peter Rowe and with music direction by Greg Palmer and choreography by Francesca Jaynes, the show was performed by a cast of 22 actor-musicians, with all music played live on stage by the cast. The show also toured Cardiff, Swansea, and other Welsh cities as well as some English cities, receiving a positive review in The Guardian.
- In August 22–25, 2012 a concert performance ran at London's Cadogan Hall, featuring Dennis Waterman, Ruthie Henshall, Anna-Jane Casey, and Lance Ellington (Strictly Come Dancing), with musical director Richard Balcombe and the Royal Philharmonic Concert Orchestra and Choir.
- In April 2014, a one-night-only performance took place at Carnegie Hall, starring Nathan Lane as Detroit (reprising the role that made him a star), Megan Mullally as Adelaide, Patrick Wilson as Sky, Sierra Boggess as Sarah, Len Cariou as Arvide, Judy Kaye as Cartwright, Christopher Fitzgerald as Benny, John Treacy Egan as Nicely, Lee Wilkof as Harry, Steve Schirripa as Jule, John Bolton as Angie the Ox and Colman Domingo as Rusty. It was directed by Jack O'Brien and featured the Orchestra of St. Luke's playing the original orchestrations.
- In October 19 – 20, 2018 a semi-staged concert production at the Royal Albert Hall, London played three performances. Directed and choreographed by Stephen Mear, the cast included Stephen Mangan (narrator), Adrian Lester (Sky Masterson), Lara Pulver (Sarah Brown), Jason Manford (Nathan Detroit), Meow Meow (Miss Adelaide), Clive Rowe (reprising his Olivier Award-winning role as Nicely Nicely Johnson), Sharon D. Clarke (General Cartwright), Joe Stilgoe (Benny Southstreet), Cory English (Rusty Charlie), and Paul Nicholas (Arvide Abernathy). Musical Director James McKeon conducted the Royal Philharmonic Concert Orchestra. In Broadway World, Debbie Gilpin described the production as "one of the standout theatrical events of the year".
- In October 2022, the Kennedy Center in Washington, D.C. produced an all-star version of the production using Starobin's orchestrations from the 1992 revival. Among those in the cast included married couple Steven Pasquale as Sky and Phillipa Soo as Sarah Brown, James Monroe Iglehart as Nathan, and Jessie Mueller as Miss Adelaide. Also in the cast were Kevin Chamberlin as Nicely Nicely, Saturday Night Live stalwart Rachel Dratch crosscast as Big Jule, Fred Applegate as Arvide Abernathy, and an uncredited Harvey Fierstein doing the prerecorded voice of Joey Biltmore. The production was directed by Marc BrunI and choreographed by Denis Jones with musical direction by Kevin Stites.
- In May and June of 2026, Grandstreet Theatre did a production of the Jr. version of the show, being showed 8 times from May 29, 2026 until June 14, 2026. Directed by Liz Alder and choreographed by Molly Roby, the cast included Abby Calnan as Sara Brown, Will Swenson as Sky Masterson, Freya Elias, Emmet Morrison as Nathan Detroit, Robby Felber as Nicely-Nicely, Leslie Carr as Benny, Owen Jenkins as Rusty, Tommy Walker as Lt. Branigan, Ashlyn New house as Gen. Cartwright, Charlie Poole as Big Jule, Declan Van Wyk as Angie the Ox, William Eldridge as Harry the Horse, Grey Haladay as Liver Lips Louie, Micah Landgji as Society Max, and minor roles played by Jaxen Craig, Eli Allred, Devan Brien, Rueben Gundlach, and Jack Petersen as other gamblers, Gracie Petersen, Sadie Riggs, Haddie Dailey, Maddie Bender, Stella Hogg, Penny Calnan, and Stella Iverson as Hot Box Girls, Sophia Wisemiller, Amelia Diedrich, and Giuliana Strainer as Dolls, and Liv Dorrington, Bennet Hussey, Aurora McNay, Sal togue, Claire Eldridge, and Shannon Hussey as Mission Band.

== Reception ==
The original Broadway production of Guys and Dolls opened to unanimously positive reviews, one of only eight musicals opening on Broadway between 1943 and 1964 that did so. This was a relief to the cast as they had a 41-performance pre-Broadway tryout in Philadelphia where each performance was different. Critics praised the musical's faithfulness to Damon Runyon's style and characterizations. Richard Watts of the New York Post wrote "Guys and Dolls is just what it should be to celebrate the Runyon spirit...filled with the salty characters and richly original language sacred to the memory of the late Master". William Hawkins of the New York World-Telegram & Sun stated "It recaptures what [Runyon] knew about Broadway, that its wickedness is tinhorn, but its gallantry is as pure and young as Little Eva". Robert Coleman of the New York Daily Mirror wrote "We think Damon would have relished it as much as we did".

The book and score were greatly praised as well; John Chapman, then Chief Theatre Critic, of the New York Daily News wrote "The book is a work of easy and delightful humor. Its music and lyrics, by Frank Loesser, are so right for the show and so completely lacking in banality, that they amount to an artistic triumph". Coleman stated "Frank Loesser has written a score that will get a big play on the juke boxes, over the radio, and in bistros throughout the land. His lyrics are especially notable in that they help Burrows's topical gags to further the plot". In The New York Times, Brooks Atkinson wrote "Mr. Loesser's lyrics and songs have the same affectionate appreciation of the material as the book, which is funny without being self-conscious or mechanical".

Multiple critics asserted that the work was of great significance to musical theatre. John McClain of the New York Journal American proclaimed "it is the best and most exciting thing of its kind since Pal Joey. It is a triumph and a delight." Atkinson stated, "we might as well admit that Guys and Dolls is a work of art. It is spontaneous and has form, style, and spirit." Chapman asserted, "In all departments, Guys and Dolls is a perfect musical comedy".

== Film adaptations ==
=== 1955 film ===
On November 3, 1955, the film version of the musical was released, starring Marlon Brando as Sky, Frank Sinatra as Nathan Detroit, and Jean Simmons as Sarah, with Vivian Blaine reprising her role as Adelaide. The film was written and directed by Joseph L. Mankiewicz and produced by Samuel Goldwyn.

Levene lost the film role of Nathan Detroit to Sinatra even though Mankiewicz wanted Levene. "You can't have a Jew playing a Jew, it wouldn't work on screen," Goldwyn argued. Frank Loesser felt Sinatra played the part like a "dapper Italian swinger". Mankiewicz said "if there could be one person in the world more miscast as Nathan Detroit than Frank Sinatra that would be Laurence Olivier and I am one of his greatest fans; the role had been written for Sam Levene who was divine in it." Sinatra did his best to give Nathan Detroit a few stereotyped Jewish gestures and inflections, but Frank Loesser hated "how Sinatra turned the rumpled Nathan Detroit into a smoothie. Sam Levene's husky untrained voice added to the song's charm, not to mention its believability." Loesser died in 1969, still refusing to watch the film.

Around the time of the film's release, American composer and lyricist Stephen Sondheim wrote film reviews for Films in Review. Sondheim (then aged 25) reviewed the film version of Guys and Dolls, and observed: "Sinatra ambles through his role as Nathan Detroit as though he were about to laugh at the jokes in the script. He has none of the sob in the voice, and the incipient ulcer in the stomach, that the part requires and Sam Levene supplied so hilariously on the stage. Sinatra sings on pitch, but colorlessly; Levene sang off pitch, but acted while he sang. Sinatra's lackadaisical performance, his careless and left handed attempt at characterization not only harm the picture immeasurably but indicate an alarming lack of professionality."

Three new songs written by Loesser were added to the film: "Pet Me Poppa"; "A Woman in Love"; and "Adelaide", which was written specifically for Sinatra. Five songs from the stage musical were omitted from the movie: "A Bushel and a Peck", "My Time of Day", I've Never Been In Love Before", "More I Cannot Wish You" and "Marry the Man Today". "A Bushel and a Peck" was later restored to the video release version.

=== Planned new adaptation ===
20th Century Fox acquired the film rights to the musical in early 2013, and was said to be planning a remake. In March 2019, TriStar Pictures acquired the remake rights, with Bill Condon hired as director two years later. In September 2024, Rob Marshall replaced Condon as the new director and co-wrote a new screenplay with his partner John DeLuca, along with John Requa and Glenn Ficarra. Serving as producers are Marshall, DeLuca, John Goldwyn, Marc Toberoff and Marc Platt.

== Casts of major productions ==
The following table shows the principal casts of the major productions of Guys and Dolls:

Casts of major productions
Character	Broadway	London	Off-Broadway Revival	Broadway Revival	London Revival	Broadway Revival	London Revival	London Revival	Broadway Revival	London Revival	London Revival
Character	1950	1953	1965	1976	1982	1992	1996	2005	2009	2015	2023
Nathan Detroit	Sam Levene	Sam Levene	Alan King	Robert Guillaume	Bob Hoskins	Nathan Lane	Henry Goodman	Douglas Hodge	Oliver Platt	David Haig	Daniel Mays
Sky Masterson	Robert Alda	Jerry Wayne	Jerry Orbach	Jimmy Randolph	Ian Charleson	Peter Gallagher	Clarke Peters	Ewan McGregor	Craig Bierko	Jamie Parker	Andrew Richardson
Sister Sarah Brown	Isabel Bigley	Lizbeth Webb	Anita Gillette	Ernestine Jackson	Julie Covington	Josie de Guzman	Joanna Riding	Jenna Russell	Kate Jennings Grant	Siubhan Harrison	Celinde Schoenmaker
Miss Adelaide	Vivian Blaine	Vivian Blaine	Sheila MacRae	Norma Donaldson	Julia McKenzie	Faith Prince	Imelda Staunton	Jane Krakowski	Lauren Graham	Sophie Thompson	Marisha Wallace
Nicely-Nicely Johnson	Stubby Kaye	Stubby Kaye	Jack De Lon	Ken Page	David Healy	Walter Bobbie	Clive Rowe	Martyn Ellis	Tituss Burgess	Gavin Spokes	Cedric Neal
Benny Southstreet	Johnny Silver	Johnny Silver	Joey Faye	Christophe Pierre	Barrie Rutter	J.K. Simmons	Wayne Cater	Cory English	Steve Rosen	Ian Hughes	Mark Oxtoby
Arvide Abernathy	Pat Rooney	Ernest Butcher	Clarence Nordstrom	Emett "Babe" Wallace	John Normington	John Carpenter	John Normington	Niall Buggy	Jim Ortlieb	Neil McCaul	Anthony O'Donnell
Harry the Horse	Tom Pedi	Tom Pedi	Tom Pedi	John Russell	Bill Paterson	Ernie Sabella	Steven Speirs	Norman Bowman	Jim Walton	Cornelius Clarke	Jordan Castle
Big Jule	B.S. Pully	Lew Herbert	Jake LaMotta	Walter White	Jim Carter	Herschel Sparber	Stanley Townsend	Sevan Stephan	Glenn Fleshler	Nic Greenshields	Cameron Johnson
Rusty Charlie	Douglas Deane	Robert Arden	Ed Becker	Sterling McQueen	Kevin Williams	Timothy Shew	Connor Byrne	Andrew Playfoot	Spencer Moses	Carl Patrick	Ryan Pidgen
Lieutenant Brannigan	Paul Reed	Robert Cawdron	Frank Campanella	Clark Morgan	Harry Towb	Steve Ryan	Colin Stinton	Patrick Brennan	Adam LeFevre	William Oxborrow	Cornelius Clarke
General Matilda B. Cartwright	Netta Packer	Colleen Clifford	Claire Waring	Edye Byrde	Irlin Hall	Ruth Williamson	Sharon D. Clarke	Gaye Brown	Mary Testa	Lorna Gayle	Katy Secombe

=== Notable replacements ===
==== Broadway (1950–1953) ====
- Miss Adelaide: Iva Withers, Gretchen Wyler (U.S.)
- Nicely-Nicely Johnson: Jack Prince, Bern Hoffman (U.S.)
- Big Jule: Bern Hoffman (U.S.)

==== Off-Broadway revival (1965) ====
- Sarah Brown: Joy Franz (U.S.)

==== London revival (1982–1986 and 1996–1997) ====
- Miss Adelaide: Imelda Staunton, Lulu
- Nathan Detroit: Trevor Peacock, Norman Rossington,
- Sky Masterson: Paul Jones, Clarke Peters
- Sarah Brown: Belinda Sinclair, Fiona Hendley, Betsy Brantley
- Nicely-Nicely Johnson: David Ryall, David Healy, Clive Rowe
- Lieutenant Brannigan: Shane Rimmer

==== Broadway revival (1992–1995) ====
- Nathan Detroit: Adam Arkin, Jamie Farr, Jonathan Hadary, Steve Ryan (U.S.)
- Sky Masterson: Burke Moses, Martin Vidnovic, Tom Wopat, Jere Shea (U.S.), Wade Williams (U.S.)
- Sarah Brown: Kim Crosby, Carolyn Mignini
- Miss Adelaide: Victoria Clark (U.S.)
- Big Jule: Ron Holgate
- Rusty Charlie: Scott Wise

==== London revival (2005–2007) ====
- Nathan Detroit: Nigel Lindsay, Neil Morrissey, Patrick Swayze, Alex Ferns, Don Johnson
- Sky Masterson: Nigel Harman, Adam Cooper, Ben Richards
- Sarah Brown: Kelly Price, Amy Nuttall, Lisa Stokke
- Miss Adelaide: Sarah Lancashire, Sally Ann Triplett, Claire Sweeney, Samantha Janus

==== Broadway revival (2009) ====
- Nathan Detroit: Adam LeFevre (U.S.)
- Sarah Brown: Jessica Rush (U.S.)
- Miss Adelaide: Lorin Latarro (U.S.)
- Nicely-Nicely Johnson: Jim Walton (U.S.)
- Lieutenant Brannigan: Jim Walton (U.S.)

==== London revival (2015–2016) ====
- Nathan Detroit: Richard Kind, Nigel Lindsay, Simon Lipkin
- Sky Masterson: Oliver Tompsett
- Miss Adelaide: Samantha Spiro, Rebel Wilson
- Arvide: Billy Boyle

==== London revival (2023–2025) ====
- Nathan Detroit: Owain Arthur
- Sarah Brown: Gina Beck

== Awards and honors ==
=== Original Broadway production ===
Year	Award Ceremony	Category	Nominee	Result
1951	Tony Awards	Best Musical		Won
1951	Tony Awards	Best Actor in a Musical	Robert Alda	Won
1951	Tony Awards	Best Featured Actress in a Musical	Isabel Bigley	Won
1951	Tony Awards	Best Choreography	Michael Kidd	Won
1951	Tony Awards	Best Direction of a Musical	George S. Kaufman	Won
1951	New York Drama Critics' Circle Awards	Best Musical	Frank Loesser, Abe Burrows and Jo Swerling	Won

=== 1965 New York City Center production ===
Year	Award Ceremony	Category	Nominee	Result
1965	Tony Awards	Best Performance by a Featured Actor in a Musical	Jerry Orbach	Nominated

=== 1976 Broadway revival ===
Year	Award Ceremony	Category	Nominee	Result
1977	Tony Awards	Best Revival		Nominated
1977	Tony Awards	Best Actor in a Musical	Robert Guillaume	Nominated
1977	Tony Awards	Best Actress in a Musical	Ernestine Jackson	Nominated
1977	Drama Desk Awards	Outstanding Actor in a Musical	Robert Guillaume	Nominated
1977	Drama Desk Awards	Outstanding Featured Actress in a Musical	Ernestine Jackson	Nominated
1977	Theatre World Award		Ken Page	Won

=== 1982 London revival ===
Year	Award Ceremony	Category	Nominee	Result
1982	Critics' Circle Theatre Award	Best Actor	Bob Hoskins	Won
1982	Critics' Circle Theatre Award	Best Designer	John Gunter	Won
1982	Evening Standard Awards	Best Director	Richard Eyre	Won
1982	Laurence Olivier Awards	Best Musical of the Year		Won
1982	Laurence Olivier Awards	Best Actor in a Musical	Bob Hoskins	Nominated
1982	Laurence Olivier Awards	Best Actress in a Musical	Julia McKenzie	Won
1982	Laurence Olivier Awards	Best Performance in a Supporting Role in a Musical	David Healy	Won
1982	Laurence Olivier Awards	Best Director	Richard Eyre	Won
1982	Laurence Olivier Awards	Best Set Design	John Gunter	Won

=== 1992 Broadway revival ===
Year	Award Ceremony	Category	Nominee	Result
1992	Tony Awards	Best Revival		Won
1992	Tony Awards	Best Actor in a Musical	Nathan Lane	Nominated
1992	Tony Awards	Best Performance by a Leading Actress in a Musical	Faith Prince	Won
1992	Tony Awards	Best Performance by a Leading Actress in a Musical	Josie de Guzman	Nominated
1992	Tony Awards	Best Direction of a Musical	Jerry Zaks	Won
1992	Tony Awards	Best Choreography	Christopher Chadman	Nominated
1992	Tony Awards	Best Scenic Design	Tony Walton	Won
1992	Tony Awards	Best Lighting Design	Paul Gallo	Nominated
1992	Drama Desk Awards	Outstanding Revival		Won
1992	Drama Desk Awards	Outstanding Actor in a Musical	Nathan Lane	Won
1992	Drama Desk Awards	Outstanding Actor in a Musical	Peter Gallagher	Nominated
1992	Drama Desk Awards	Outstanding Actress in a Musical	Faith Prince	Won
1992	Drama Desk Awards	Outstanding Featured Actor in a Musical	Walter Bobbie	Nominated
1992	Drama Desk Awards	Outstanding Director of a Musical	Jerry Zaks	Won
1992	Drama Desk Awards	Outstanding Choreography	Christopher Chadman	Nominated
1992	Drama Desk Awards	Outstanding Set Design	Tony Walton	Won
1992	Drama Desk Awards	Outstanding Costume Design	William Ivey Long	Won
1992	Drama Desk Awards	Outstanding Lighting Design	Paul Gallo	Won

=== 1996 London revival ===
Year	Award Ceremony	Category	Nominee	Result
1996	Critics' Circle Theatre Award	Best Director	Richard Eyre	Won
1997	Laurence Olivier Awards	Best Actress in a Musical	Imelda Staunton	Nominated
1997	Laurence Olivier Awards	Best Actress in a Musical	Joanna Riding	Nominated
1997	Laurence Olivier Awards	Best Performance in a Supporting Role in a Musical	Clive Rowe	Won

=== 2005 London revival ===
Year	Award Ceremony	Category	Nominee	Result
2006	Laurence Olivier Awards	Outstanding Musical Production		Won
2006	Laurence Olivier Awards	Best Actor in a Musical	Douglas Hodge	Nominated
2006	Laurence Olivier Awards	Best Actor in a Musical	Ewan McGregor	Nominated
2006	Laurence Olivier Awards	Best Actress in a Musical	Jane Krakowski	Won
2006	Laurence Olivier Awards	Best Actress in a Musical	Jenna Russell	Nominated
2006	Laurence Olivier Awards	Best Theatre Choreographer	Rob Ashford	Nominated
2006	Laurence Olivier Awards	Best Sound Design	Terry Jardine and Chris Full	Nominated
2006	Laurence Olivier Awards	Best Lighting Design	Howard Harrison	Nominated

=== 2008 Australian production ===
Year	Award Ceremony	Category	Nominee	Result
2008	Helpmann Awards	Best Musical		Nominated
2008	Helpmann Awards	Best Actress in a Musical	Marina Prior	Nominated
2008	Helpmann Awards	Best Supporting Actor in a Musical	Shane Jacobson	Won
2008	Helpmann Awards	Best Direction in a Musical	Michael Grandage and Jamie Lloyd	Nominated
2008	Helpmann Awards	Best Choreography in a Musical	Rob Ashford	Nominated
2008	Helpmann Awards	Best Sound Design	Chris Full, John Scandrett and Nick Reich	Nominated

=== 2009 Broadway revival ===
Year	Award Ceremony	Category	Nominee	Result
2009	Tony Awards	Best Revival of a Musical		Nominated
2009	Tony Awards	Best Scenic Design	Robert Brill	Nominated

=== 2015 London revival ===
Year	Award Ceremony	Category	Nominee	Result
2015	Laurence Olivier Awards	Best Musical Revival		Nominated
2015	Laurence Olivier Awards	Best Actor in a Musical	David Haig	Nominated
2015	Laurence Olivier Awards	Best Actor in a Musical	Jamie Parker	Nominated
2015	Laurence Olivier Awards	Best Actress in a Musical	Sophie Thompson	Nominated
2015	Laurence Olivier Awards	Best Actor in a Supporting Role in a Musical	Gavin Spokes	Nominated
2015	Laurence Olivier Awards	Best Theatre Choreographer	Carlos Acosta & Andrew Wright	Nominated

=== 2022 Kennedy Center production ===
Year	Award Ceremony	Category	Nominee	Result
2023	Helen Hayes Award	Outstanding Performer in a Visiting Production	Kevin Chamberlin	Won
2023	Helen Hayes Award	Outstanding Performer in a Visiting Production	Steven Pasquale	Nominated
2023	Helen Hayes Award	Outstanding Performer in a Visiting Production	Phillipa Soo	Nominated
2023	Helen Hayes Award	Outstanding Visiting Production		Won

=== 2023 London revival ===
Year	Award Ceremony	Category	Nominee	Result
2023	Evening Standard Theatre Awards	Best Musical		Won
2023	Evening Standard Theatre Awards	Best Director	Nicholas Hytner	Nominated
2023	Evening Standard Theatre Awards	Best Musical Performance	Marisha Wallace	Nominated
2023	Evening Standard Theatre Awards	Emerging Talent	Andrew Richardson	Nominated
2023	Evening Standard Theatre Awards	Best Design	Bunny Christie	Nominated
2024	WhatsOnStage Awards	Best Musical Revival		Won
2024	WhatsOnStage Awards	Best Performer in a Musical	Marisha Wallace	Nominated
2024	WhatsOnStage Awards	Best Supporting Performer in a Musical	Cedric Neal	Nominated
2024	WhatsOnStage Awards	Best Professional Debut Performance	Andrew Richardson	Nominated
2024	WhatsOnStage Awards	Best Direction	Nicholas Hytner	Nominated
2024	WhatsOnStage Awards	Best Musical Direction/Supervision	Tom Brady	Nominated
2024	WhatsOnStage Awards	Best Choreography	Arlene Phillips & James Cousins	Nominated
2024	WhatsOnStage Awards	Best Costume Design	Bunny Christie & Deborah Andrews	Nominated
2024	WhatsOnStage Awards	Best Lighting Design	Paule Constable	Nominated
2024	WhatsOnStage Awards	Best Set Design	Bunny Christie	Won
2024	WhatsOnStage Awards	Best Sound Design	Paul Arditti	Nominated
2024	WhatsOnStage Awards	Best Graphic Design	Muse Creative	Won
2024	Laurence Olivier Awards	Best Musical Revival		Nominated
2024	Laurence Olivier Awards	Best Actor in a Musical	Daniel Mays	Nominated
2024	Laurence Olivier Awards	Best Actress in a Musical	Marisha Wallace	Nominated
2024	Laurence Olivier Awards	Best Supporting Actor in a Musical	Cedric Neal	Nominated
2024	Laurence Olivier Awards	Best Choreographer	Arlene Phillips, James Cousins	Won
2024	Laurence Olivier Awards	Best Costume Design	Bunny Christie, Deborah Andrews	Nominated
2024	Laurence Olivier Awards	Best Set Design	Bunny Christie	Nominated
2024	Laurence Olivier Awards	Best Lighting Design	Paule Constable	Nominated
2024	Laurence Olivier Awards	Outstanding Musical Contribution	Tom Brady (Musical Supervision & Arrangements), Charlie Rosen (Orchestrations)	Nominated

== Recordings ==
There are numerous recordings of the show's score. These include:

- Original 1950 Broadway Cast
- 1955 Film Soundtrack
- 1963 Reprise Musical Repertory Theatre studio recording (Bing Crosby, Frank Sinatra, Debbie Reynolds, Dean Martin, Jo Stafford, The McGuire Sisters, Dinah Shore, Sammy Davis Jr., Allan Sherman)
- 1976 Broadway Revival Cast
- 1982 London Revival Cast
- 1992 Broadway Revival Cast
- 1995 Complete Studio Recording (features the entire score for the first time on CD; with Gregg Edelman as Sky Masterson, Tim Flavin as Nathan Detroit, Frank Loesser's daughter Emily as Sarah Brown and conducted by John Owen Edwards)
- 2023 London Revival Cast
