= Vivian Blaine =

American actress and singer (1921–1995)

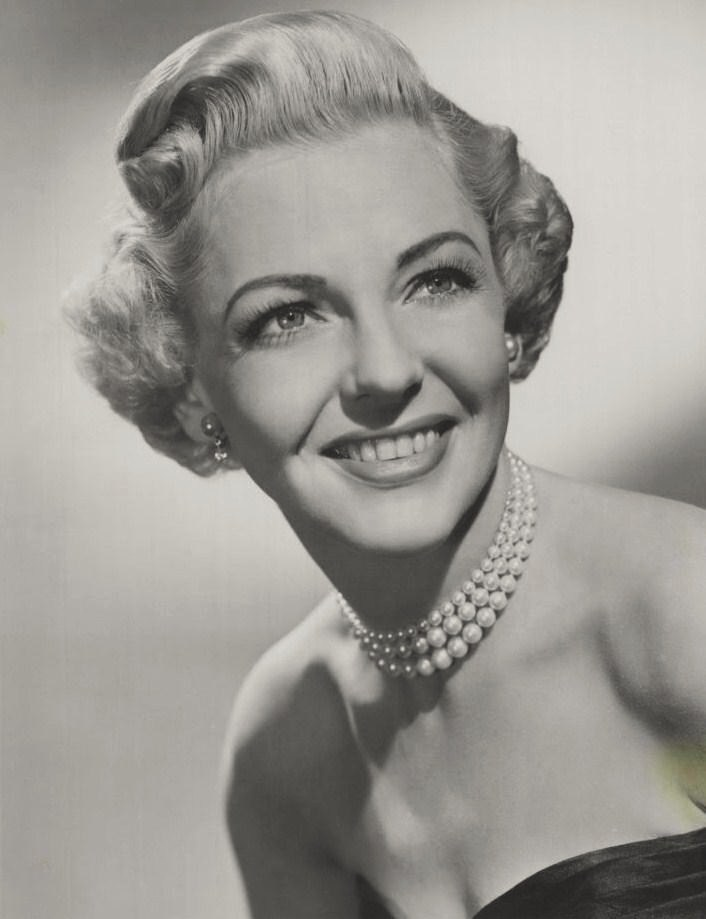
- Blaine in 1955
- Born: Vivian Stapleton; November 21, 1921; Newark, New Jersey, U.S.
- Died: December 9, 1995 (aged 74); New York City, U.S.
- Education: South Side High School
- Occupations: Actress; Singer
- Years active: 1934–1985
- Known for: Guys and Dolls; Something for the Boys; State Fair
- Spouses: Manny Franks (m. 1945; div. 1956) Milton Rackmil (m. 1959; div. 1961) Stuart Clark (m. 1973)

Vivian Blaine (born Vivian Stapleton; November 21, 1921 – December 9, 1995) was an American actress and singer, best known for originating the role of Miss Adelaide in the musical theater production of Guys and Dolls, as well as appearing in the subsequent film version, in which she co-starred with Marlon Brando, Jean Simmons and Frank Sinatra.

== Early life ==
Blaine was born in Newark, New Jersey, to Leo Stapleton, an insurance agent, and Wilhelmina Tepley. The cherry-blonde-haired Blaine appeared on local stages as early as 1934 and she started touring after graduating from South Side High School.

== Personal appearances ==
Blaine was a touring singer with dance bands starting in 1937.

At one point in the 1940s, she was the top-billed act at New York's Copacabana nightclub. In his book, Dean and Me: (A Love Story), Jerry Lewis wrote about appearing at the club when Blaine was on the same bill: "We [Lewis and Dean Martin, as the double act Martin and Lewis] weren't even the top-billed act. That honor went to a Broadway singing star named Vivian Blaine, who'd conquered Manhattan, gone out to Hollywood to make movies for 20th Century Fox, then returned to the Big Apple in triumph. Vivian was a lovely and very talented actress and singer ..."

== Film ==
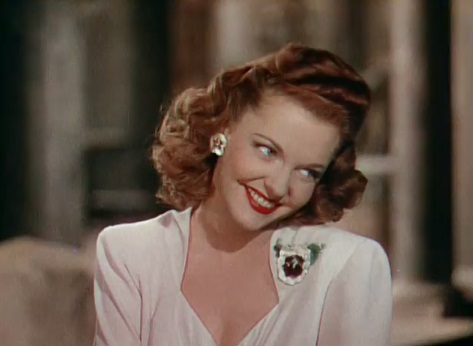
Vivian Blaine in Something for the Boys (1944)

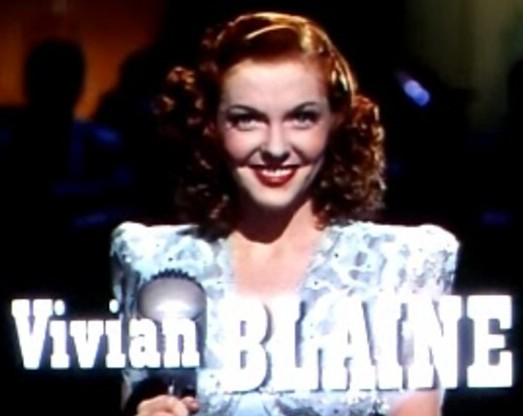
Screenshot of Vivian Blaine from the trailer for State Fair (1945)

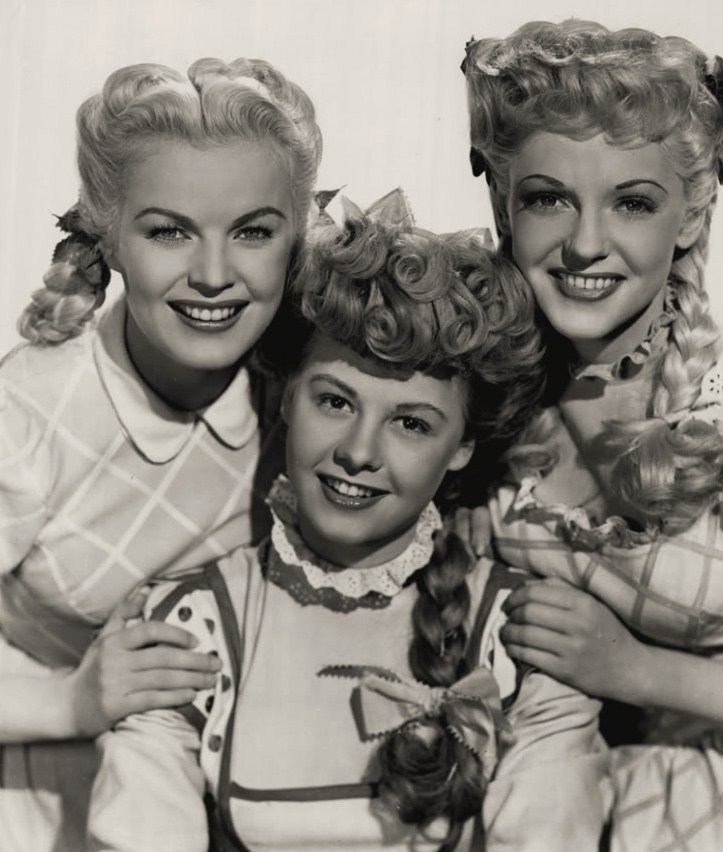
(L–R): June Haver, Vera-Ellen and Vivian Blaine in Three Little Girls in Blue (1946)

In 1942, Blaine's agent and soon-to-be husband Manny Franks signed her to a contract with Twentieth Century-Fox, and she moved to Hollywood, sharing top billing with Laurel and Hardy in Jitterbugs (1943) and starring in Greenwich Village (1944), Something for the Boys (1944), Nob Hill (1945), and State Fair (1945).

== Stage ==
Blaine appeared on Broadway in Guys and Dolls; A Hatful of Rain; Say, Darling; Enter Laughing; Company; and Zorba, as well as participating in the touring companies of plays such as Light Up the Sky; and musicals such as Gypsy.

== Television ==
Blaine was a special guest during the This is Your Life tribute episode to Laurel and Hardy, seen over NBC-TV on December 1, 1954. Blaine had worked with the duo in the film Jitterbugs and had fond memories of the experience.

On the 25th annual Tony Awards in 1971, she appeared as a guest performer and sang "Adelaide's Lament" from Guys and Dolls.

Later in her career, her television career took off, with guest appearances on shows like Fantasy Island, The Love Boat (S2 E9 1978), and a recurring role in the cult hit Mary Hartman, Mary Hartman.

Her final onscreen appearance was in "Broadway Malady", a Season 1 episode of Murder, She Wrote.

== Personal life ==
In 1983, Blaine became the first celebrity to make public service announcements for AIDS-related causes. She made numerous appearances in support of the then-fledgling AIDS Project Los Angeles (APLA) and in 1983 recorded her cabaret act for AEI Records, which donated its royalties to the new group; this included the last recordings of her songs from Guys and Dolls. Her prior albums for Mercury Records have all subsequently been reissued on CD.

== Death ==
Blaine died of congestive heart failure in Beth Israel Hospital North in New York City on December 9, 1995, aged 74.

== Filmography ==
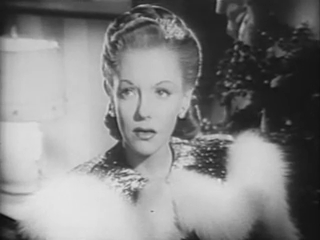
Vivian Blaine in 1946 film Doll Face

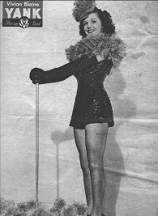
Pin-up photo of Vivian Blaine for the September 1, 1944 issue of Yank, the Army Weekly

=== Film ===
Year	Title	Role	Notes
1942	It Happened in Flatbush	Minor Role	
1942	Thru Different Eyes	Sue Boardman	
1942	Girl Trouble	Barbara	Alternate titles: Between You and Me / Man from Brazil
1943	He Hired the Boss	Sally Conway	
1943	Jitterbugs	Susan Cowan	
1944	Greenwich Village	Bonnie Watson	
1944	Something for the Boys	Blossom Hart	
1945	Nob Hill	Sally Templeton	
1945	State Fair	Emily Edwards	
1945	Doll Face	Mary Elizabeth 'Doll Face' Carroll	Alternate title: Come Back to Me
1946	If I'm Lucky	Linda Farrell	
1946	Three Little Girls in Blue	Liz Charters	
1952	Skirts Ahoy!	Una Yancy	
1953	Main Street to Broadway	Vivian Blaine	Uncredited
1955	Guys and Dolls	Miss Adelaide	
1957	Public Pigeon No. 1	Rita DeLacey	
1972	Richard	Washington Doctor	
1979	The Dark	Courtney Floyd	
1982	Parasite	Miss Elizabeth Daley	
1983	I'm Going to Be Famous	Laura Lowell	(final film role)

=== Television ===
Year	Title	Role	Notes
1953	The Philco Television Playhouse		Episode - "Double Jeopardy"
1954	Center Stage		Episode - "Heart of a Clown"
1954	The Colgate Comedy Hour	Winnie Potter	Episode - "Let's Face It"
1955	Damon Runyon Theater	Cutie Singleton	Episode - "Pick the Winner"
1955	Hallmark Hall of Fame	Georgina Allerton	Episode - "Dream Girl"
1955	What's My Line?	Mystery Guest	
1956	The Bob Hope Show	Toots Biswanger	Episode - "The Awful Truth"
1956	G.E. Summer Originals	Sunny	Episode - "It's Sunny Again"
1957	Lux Video Theatre	Coral	Episode - "The Undesirable"
1963	Route 66	Dixie Martin	Episode - "A Bunch of Lonely Pagliaccis"
1976	Mary Hartman, Mary Hartman	Betty McCullough	21 episodes
1978	Fantasy Island	Mrs. Deverse	Episode - "The Big Dipper/The Pirate"
1978	Katie: Portrait of a Centerfold	Marietta Cutler	TV movie
1978	The Love Boat	Barbara Sharp	Episode - "The Minister and the Stripper"
1979	Vega$	Lenora	Episode - "Everything I Touch"
1979	The Cracker Factory	Helen	TV movie
1979	Fast Friends	Sylvia	TV movie
1979	Sooner or Later	Make-up Artist	TV movie
1979	CHiPs	Herself	Episode - "Roller Disco: Part 2"
1983	Amanda's	Aunt Sonia	Episode - "Aunt Sonia"
1985	Murder, She Wrote	Rita Bristol	Episode - "Broadway Malady" (final television role)

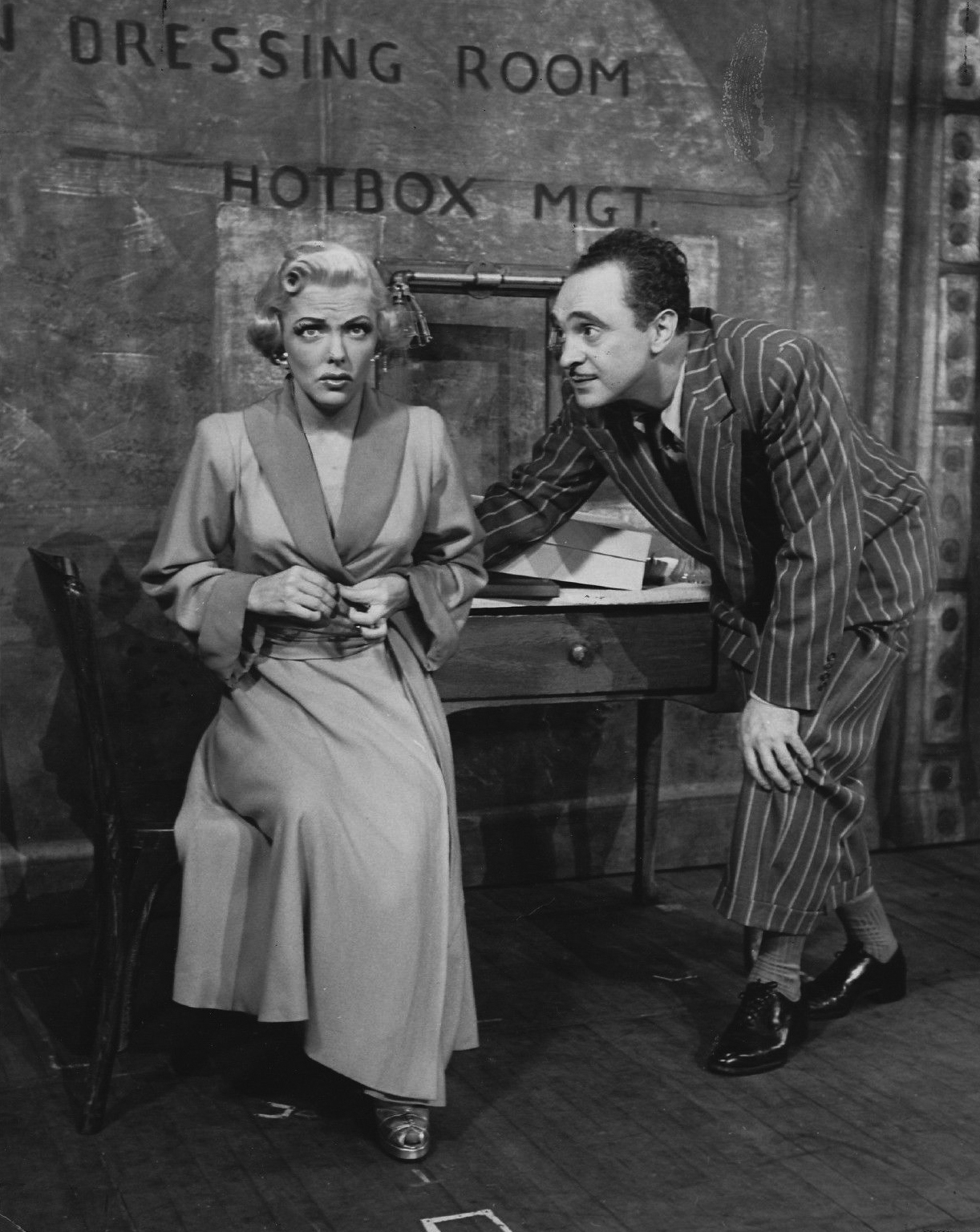
Vivian Blaine as Miss Adelaide and Sam Levene as Nathan Detroit in the original 1950 Broadway production of Guys and Dolls

== Stage work ==
- One Touch of Venus (1948)
- Bloomer Girl (1949)
- Light Up the Sky (1949)
- Guys and Dolls (1950–53)
- Panama Hattie (1955)
- A Hatful of Rain (1956–58)
- Rain (1957)
- Say, Darling (1958)
- Gypsy (1960)
- A Streetcar Named Desire (1961)
- Born Yesterday (1961)
- Gypsy (1962)
- Enter Laughing (1963)
- Mr. President (1964)
- Guys and Dolls (1964-1966)
- Never Too Late (1965)
- Cactus Flower (1966–67)
- Damn Yankees (1967)
- Any Wednesday (1968)
- Don't Drink the Water (1968–69)
- Take Me Along (1968)
- The Marriage-Go-Round (1970)
- Zorba (1970–71)
- Company (1971–73)
- Light Up the Sky (1971)
- The Glass Menagerie (1972)
- Follies (1973)
- I Do! I Do! (1973)
- Twigs (1973–74)
- Hello, Dolly! (1974)
- The Best of Everybody (1975)
- Brothers and Sisters (1975)
- Light Up the Sky (1975)
- Almost on a Runway (1976)
- How the Other Half Loves (1977)
- Last of the Red Hot Lovers (1977–79)
- The Boy Friend (1979)
- The Prisoner of Second Avenue (1979)
- Zorba (1984) (replacement for Lila Kedrova)
- Hello, Dolly! (1985)
