= List of Lucille Ball performances =

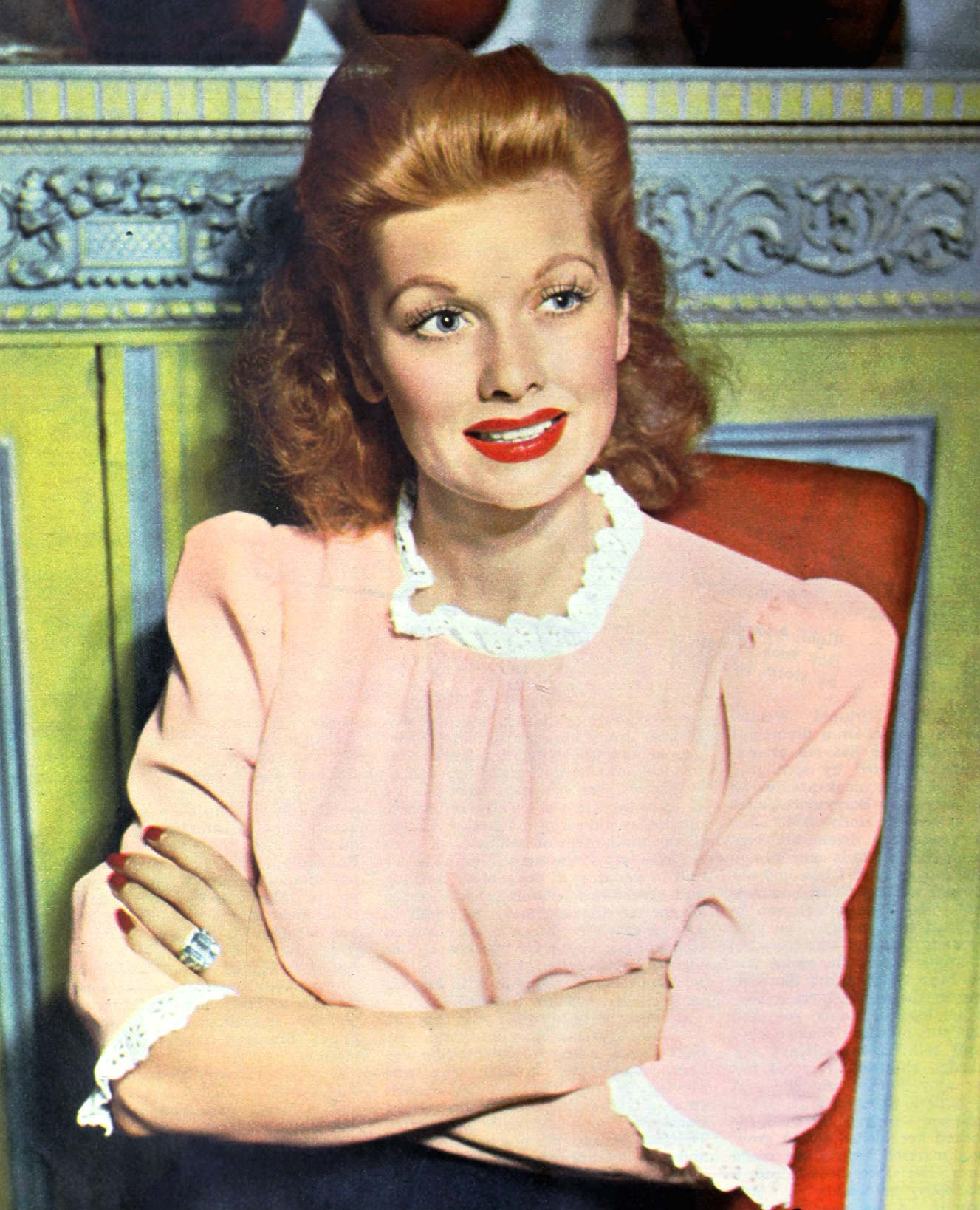
Ball in 1943

This article is the filmography of American actress Lucille Ball (August 6, 1911 – April 26, 1989). Ball appeared in movies and on television from 1927 until 1986.

== Film ==
Year	Title	Role	Notes	Ref(s)
1927	Tillie the Toiler	Extra	Claimed by Ball, but disputed	
1933	The Bowery	Blonde	20th Century Fox (uncredited)	
1933	Blood Money	Davy's girlfriend at racetrack	20th Century Fox (uncredited)	
1933	Broadway Through a Keyhole	Girl with Louie	20th Century Fox (uncredited)	
1933	Roman Scandals	Goldwyn Girl	Samuel Goldwyn Productions	
1934	Bottoms Up		20th Century Fox (uncredited)	
1934	Fugitive Lady	Beauty operator	Columbia Pictures (uncredited)	
1934	Kid Millions	Goldwyn Girl	Samuel Goldwyn Productions (uncredited)	
1934	Men of the Night	Peggy	Columbia Pictures	
1934	Broadway Bill	Switchboard operator	Columbia Pictures (uncredited)	
1934	Moulin Rouge	Show girl	20th Century Fox (uncredited)	
1934	Nana	Chorus girl	Samuel Goldwyn Productions (uncredited)	
1934	Hold That Girl	Girl	Fox Film Corporation (uncredited)	
1934	Murder at the Vanities	Earl Carroll Girl	Paramount Pictures	
1934	Bulldog Drummond Strikes Back	Girl	20th Century Fox (uncredited)	
1934	The Affairs of Cellini	Lady-in-Waiting	20th Century Fox (uncredited)	
1934	Jealousy	Extra	Columbia Pictures	
1934	Three Little Pigskins	Blonde Girl	Columbia Pictures	
1935	Top Hat	Flower shop clerk	RKO Radio Pictures (uncredited)	
1935	I Dream Too Much	Gwendolyn Dilley	RKO Radio Pictures	
1935	The Whole Town's Talking	Bank employee	Columbia Pictures (uncredited)	
1935	Roberta	Fashion Model	RKO Radio Pictures (uncredited)	
1935	Behind the Evidence	Secretary	Columbia Pictures (uncredited)	
1935	Carnival	Nurse	Columbia Pictures (uncredited)	
1935	The Three Musketeers	Lady in Waiting	RKO Radio Pictures (uncredited)	
1935	I'll Love You Always	Lucille	Columbia Pictures (uncredited)	
1935	Old Man Rhythm	College Girl	RKO Radio Pictures (uncredited)	
1936	Chatterbox	Lillian Temple	RKO Radio Pictures (uncredited)	
1936	Muss 'Em Up	Departing train passenger	RKO Radio Pictures (uncredited)	
1936	Follow the Fleet	Kitty Collins	RKO Radio Pictures	
1936	The Farmer in the Dell	Gloria Wilson	RKO Radio Pictures (uncredited)	
1936	Bunker Bean	Rosie Kelly	RKO Radio Pictures (uncredited)	
1936	Winterset	Girl	RKO Radio Pictures	
1936	That Girl from Paris	Claire 'Clair' Williams	RKO Radio Pictures (uncredited)	
1937	Don't Tell the Wife	Ann 'Annie' Howell	RKO Radio Pictures (uncredited)	
1937	Stage Door	Judith	RKO Radio Pictures	
1938	Go Chase Yourself	Carol Meeley	RKO Radio Pictures	
1938	Joy of Living	Salina Pine	RKO Radio Pictures	
1938	Having Wonderful Time	Miriam	RKO Radio Pictures	
1938	The Affairs of Annabel	Annabel Allison; Mary Mason	RKO Radio Pictures	
1938	Room Service	Christine	RKO Radio Pictures	
1938	Annabel Takes a Tour	Annabel Allison	RKO Radio Pictures	
1938	Next Time I Marry	Nancy Crocker Fleming	RKO Radio Pictures	
1939	Beauty for the Asking	Jean Russell	RKO Radio Pictures	
1939	Twelve Crowded Hours	Paula Sanders	RKO Radio Pictures	
1939	Panama Lady	Luc	RKO Radio Pictures	
1939	Five Came Back	Peggy Nolan	RKO Radio Pictures	
1939	That's Right – You're Wrong	Sandra Sand	RKO Radio Pictures	
1940	The Marines Fly High	Joan Grant	RKO Radio Pictures	
1940	You Can't Fool Your Wife	Clara Fields Hinklin / Mercedes Vasquez	RKO Radio Pictures	
1940	Dance, Girl, Dance	Bubbles	RKO Radio Pictures	
1940	Too Many Girls	Connie Casey	RKO Radio Pictures	
1941	A Girl, a Guy, and a Gob	Dorothy 'Dot' / 'Spindle' Duncan	RKO Radio Pictures	
1941	Look Who's Laughing	Julie Patterson	RKO Radio Pictures	
1942	Valley of the Sun	Christine Larson	RKO Radio Pictures	
1942	The Big Street	Gloria Lyons	RKO Radio Pictures	
1942	Seven Days' Leave	Terry Havalok-Allen	RKO Radio Pictures	
1943	Du Barry Was a Lady	May Daly / Madame Du Barry	MGM	
1943	Thousands Cheer	Herself	MGM	
1943	Best Foot Forward	Herself	MGM	
1944	Meet the People	Julie Hampton	MGM	
1945	Without Love	Kitty Trimble	MGM	
1945	Abbott and Costello in Hollywood	Herself	MGM	
1946	Ziegfeld Follies	Dancer in "Here's to the Girls"	MGM	
1946	The Dark Corner	Kathleen Stewart	20th Century Fox	
1946	Two Smart People	Ricki Woodner	MGM	
1946	Easy to Wed	Gladys Benton	MGM	
1946	Lover Come Back	Kay Williams	Fessier Pagani Productions	
1947	Lured	Sandra Carpenter	Oakmont Pictures, Inc.	
1947	Her Husband's Affairs	Margaret Weldon	Cornell Pictures, Inc.	
1949	Sorrowful Jones	Gladys O'Neill	Paramount Pictures	
1949	Miss Grant Takes Richmond	Ellen Grant	Columbia Pictures	
1949	Easy Living	Anne	RKO Radio Pictures	
1950	A Woman of Distinction	Herself	Columbia Pictures	
1950	Fancy Pants	Agatha Floud	Paramount Pictures	
1950	The Fuller Brush Girl	Sally Elliot	Columbia Pictures	
1951	The Magic Carpet	Princess Narah	Columbia Pictures	
1953	I Love Lucy: The Movie	Lucy Ricardo	Mislabeled in 1953, shelved and lost until 2001; Paramount Pictures	
1954	The Long, Long Trailer	Tacy Collini	MGM	
1956	Forever, Darling	Susan Vega	Zanra Productions, Inc. MGM	
1960	The Facts of Life	Kitty Weaver	United Artists	
1963	Critic's Choice	Angela Ballantine	Warner Bros.	
1967	A Guide for the Married Man	Mrs Joe X (cameo)	20th Century Fox	
1968	Yours, Mine and Ours	Helen Beardsley	Desilu Productions	
1974	Mame	Mame Dennis	Warner Bros.	

=== Short subjects ===
Selected list

- Perfectly Mismated (1934)
- Three Little Pigskins (1934)
- His Old Flame (1935)
- A Night at the Biltmore Bowl (1935)
- Foolish Hearts (1935)
- Dummy Ache (1936)
- Swing It (1936)
- So and Sew (1936)
- One Live Ghost (1936)
- Screen Snapshots Series 18, No. 1 (1938)
- Meet the Stars #6: Stars at Play (1941)
- All About People (1967)

== Television ==
Year	Title	Role	Notes	Ref(s)
1949	The Ed Wynn Show	Herself	Episode: "Lucille Ball and Desi Arnaz"	
1951–1957	I Love Lucy	Lucy Ricardo	180 episodes	
1957–1960	The Lucy–Desi Comedy Hour	Lucy Ricardo	13 episodes	
1958	Westinghouse Desilu Playhouse	Kitty Williams	Episode "K.O. Kitty"	
1959	The Phil Silvers Show	Fainting Fan	Episode: "Bilko's Ape Man"; uncredited	
1959	Make Room for Daddy	Lucy Ricardo	Episode: "Lucy Upsets the Williams Household"	
1959	The Ann Sothern Show	Lucy Ricardo	Episode: "The Lucy Story"	
1959	Sunday Showcase	Lucy Ricardo	Episode: "The Lucy-Desi Milton Berle Special"	
1962	The Good Years	Herself	CBS TV special	
1962	The Danny Kaye Show with Lucille Ball	Herself	TV special	
1962–1968	The Lucy Show	Lucy Carmichael	158 episodes	
1962	The Bob Hope Specials			
1963	The Greatest Show on Earth	Kate Reynolds	Episode: "Lady in Limbo"	
1964	Mr. and Mrs.			
1964	The Lucille Ball Comedy Hour	Bonnie Blakely	Television movie	
1966	Lucy in London	Lucy Carmichael	TV special	
1967	Carol + 2	Herself	TV special	
1967–1971	The Carol Burnett Show	Herself	4 episodes	
1968–1974	Here's Lucy	Lucy Carter	144 episodes	
1970	Sing Out, Sweet Land	Statue of Liberty	Voice; Television movie	
1971	The Flip Wilson Show	Herself	Episode #2.1	
1971	Make Room for Granddaddy	Lucy Carter	Episode: "Lucy and the Lecher"	
1974	Happy Anniversary and Goodbye	Norma Michaels	TV movie	
1975	Lucy Gets Lucky	Lucy Collins	TV movie	
1975	Three for Two	Rita / Sally / Pauline	TV movie	
1976	What Now, Catherine Curtis?	Catherine Curtis	TV movie	
1976	The Practice	Matilda Morrison	Episode: "The Dream"	
1976	CBS Salutes Lucy: The First 25 Years	Herself	TV special	
1977	Lucy Calls the President	Lucy Whittaker	TV movie	
1978	Lucy Comes to Nashville	Herself	TV special	
1979	The Mary Tyler Moore Hour	Herself	Episode #1.1	
1979	Cher... and Other Fantasies	Cleaning Lady	Television movie	
1980	Lucy Moves to NBC	Herself	TV movie	
1982	Three's Company	Herself	2 episodes	
1985	Stone Pillow	Florabelle	TV movie	
1986	Life with Lucy	Lucy Barker	13 episodes	

== Radio ==
Year	Program	Episode	Notes	Ref
1940	The Campbell Playhouse	"Dinner at Eight"	with Orson Welles, Marjorie Rambeau and Hedda Hopper	
1941	The Orson Welles Show	October 13, 1941		
1943	Mail Call	"The Wedding Night"	with Edgar Kennedy, Patsy Moran and Laurel and Hardy	
1944	The Orson Welles Almanac	2 episodes		
1944	Suspense	"Dime a Dance"		
1944	Suspense	"The Ten Grand"		
1944	Lux Radio Theatre	"Lucky Partners"		
1945	Suspense	"A Shroud for Sarah"		
1947	Suspense			
1947	Lux Radio Theatre	"The Dark Corner"		
1951	Screen Directors Playhouse	"Bachelor Mother"		
1948–1951	My Favorite Husband	124 episodes	(July 5, 1948 – March 31, 1951)	
1964–1965	Let's Talk to Lucy	255 episodes	(September 7, 1964 to August 27, 1965)	

== Stage ==
Year(s)	Title	Role	Notes
1937	Hey Diddle Diddle	Julie Tucker	
1947–1948	Dream Girl	Georgina Allerton	U.S. Tour
1960–1961	Wildcat	Wildcat Jackson	Broadway debut

== Bibliography ==
- Ball, Lucille (1996). Love, Lucy. Putnam. ISBN 978-0-399-14205-5.
- Dunning, John (1998). On the Air: The Encyclopedia of Old-Time Radio. New York: Oxford University Press. ISBN 978-0-19-507678-3.
- Karol, Michael (2004). Lucy A to Z. iUniverse. p. 122. ISBN 978-0-595-75213-3.
