= Hey, Look Me Over (song) =

Song from the musical Wildcat

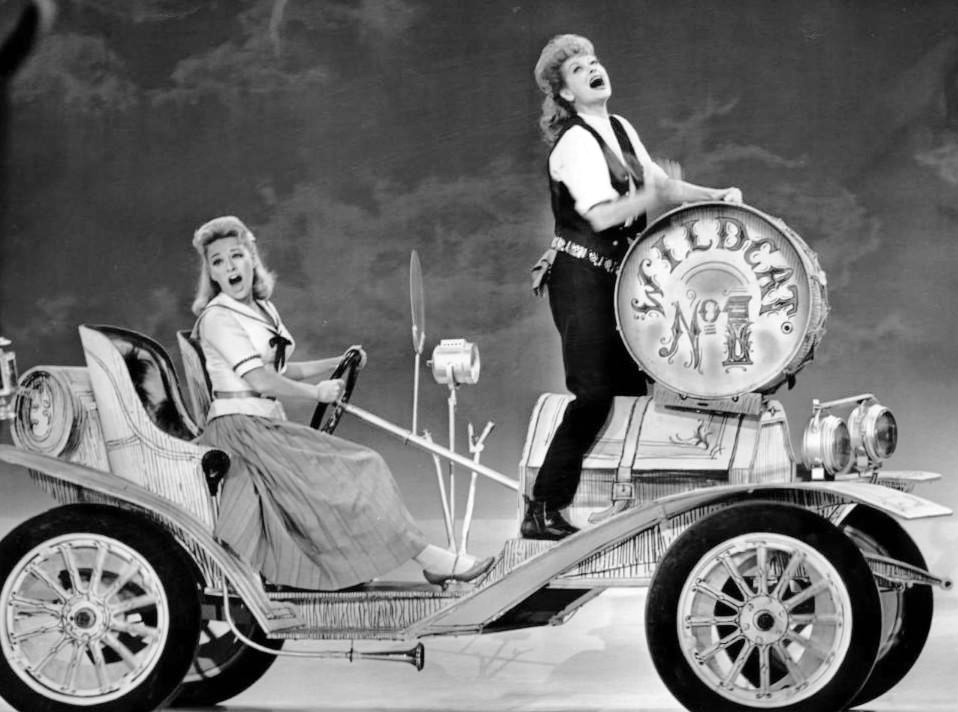
Paula Stewart and Lucille Ball performing the song in an excerpt from Wildcat on The Ed Sullivan Show (1961)

"Hey, Look Me Over" is a song from the 1960 Broadway musical Wildcat. In that show, it was introduced by Lucille Ball, in her only leading Broadway appearance.

Cy Coleman later described the problem facing the songwriting team (Coleman and Carolyn Leigh): "How to write for a woman who had five good notes. And not just any woman, but the biggest star in the world at the time. What is she going to sing when she steps out on that stage for the first time? She had to land big or else we were all dead." During a brainstorming session, Coleman played one of his ideas on piano, doubtful it would work as a star vehicle. Leigh surprised him by calling back a few days later with a funny (incomplete) lyric for his melody.

Ball and co-star Paula Stewart performed the song live on The Ed Sullivan Show, and it was subsequently recorded and/or performed by, among others, Louis Armstrong, Judy Garland, Rosemary Clooney, Bing Crosby, Peggy Lee, Johnny Mathis, Bobby Short, Gene Krupa, Mel Tormé, Jerry Vale, Julie Wilson, Lucie Arnaz, the Pete King Chorale, and British singer Ronnie Hilton. The melody of 'Hey Look Me Over' was used for the tune of a campaign song for Ted Kennedy's 1962 special election senate campaign, the singer of which is unknown but is highly believed to be Mitch Miller. The melody is also used in the song "Hey Fighting Tigers", a song for Louisiana State University.
