= Fay (TV series) =

American sitcom television series

- Genre: Sitcom
- Created by: Susan Harris
- Directed by: Alan Arkin; James Burrows
- Starring: Lee Grant; Joe Silver; Audra Lindley; Margaret Willock; Stewart Moss; Bill Gerber; Norman Alden; Lillian Lehman
- Opening theme: "Coming into My Own" performed by Jaye P. Morgan
- Composer: George Tipton
- Country of origin: United States
- Original language: English
- No. of seasons: 1
- No. of episodes: 10

Production
- Executive producer: Paul Junger Witt
- Producers: Jerry Mayer; Lee Grant
- Running time: 30 minutes
- Production companies: Danny Thomas Productions; Universal Television

Original release
- Network: NBC
- Release: September 4, 1975 – June 2, 1976

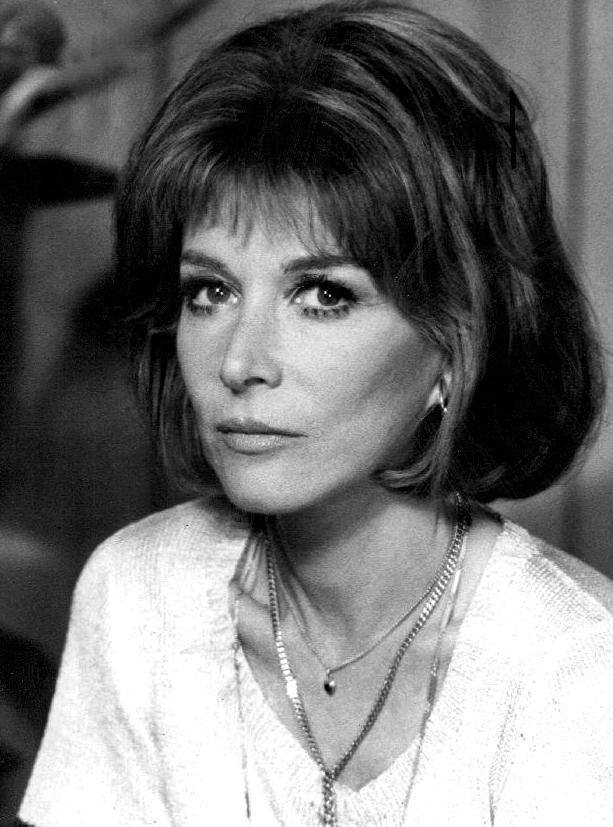
Lee Grant in Fay, 1975

Fay is an American sitcom starring Lee Grant as the title character, a divorced woman pursuing a swinging-singles lifestyle in San Francisco. The series aired on NBC from September 1975 to June 1976.

== Cast ==
- Lee Grant as Fay Stewart
- Audra Lindley as Lillian
- Joe Silver as Jack Stewart
- Margaret Willock as Linda Stewart Baines
- Stewart Moss as Dr. Elliot Baines
- Bill Gerber as Danny Messina
- Norman Alden as Al Cassidy
- Lillian Lehman as Letty Gilmore

== Plot ==
Fay Stewart is a 43-year-old woman in San Francisco who divorces her philandering husband, attorney Jack Stewart, after 25 years of marriage. She takes a job as a secretary in a law firm run by two eccentric attorneys, her boss Danny Messina and his partner Al Cassidy, where she befriends another secretary, Letty Gilmore. She then moves into her own apartment and begins dating, leading the life of a swinging single and getting involved in rather risqué situations. Jack keeps trying to win her back, and her conservative daughter Linda and stuffy son-in-law Elliot disapprove of her new lifestyle. In contrast, her tactless, unhappily married neighbor and friend Lillian lives vicariously through Fay's romantic adventures.

== Production ==
Susan Harris created Fay, Paul Junger Witt was its executive producer, and Jerry Mayer was it producer. Episode directors included Alan Arkin and James Burrows. The show was a production of Danny Thomas Productions and Universal Television.

Jaye P. Morgan performed the theme song, "Coming into My Own," composed by George Tipton.

Fay had a notably unsuccessful run. Harris criticized NBC for the show's failure, saying that it had been intended as a sophisticated adult comedy, but the network scheduled it to air at 8:30 p.m. in the middle of the "family viewing hour." The network then had ordered many changes to the show's characterization and dialogue to make it suitable for family viewing, weakening Fay′s intended import. The series is notable for Lee Grant's lashing out at NBC executives on The Tonight Show on October 30, 1975, for the network's poor scheduling and quick cancellation of Fay.

At the 28th Primetime Emmy Awards in 1976, Grant was nominated for an Emmy for Outstanding Lead Actress in a Comedy Series for Fay but lost out to Mary Tyler Moore for Moore's performance in The Mary Tyler Moore Show.

== Broadcast history ==
Fay first aired on September 4, 1975, and ran for eight episodes at 8:30 p.m. Eastern Time on Thursdays before it was pulled from NBC's lineup after the episode of October 23, 1975 (along with The Montefuscos, which aired in the time slot immediately before Fay). It returned for two more episodes on May 12 and June 2, 1976, both on Wednesday at 9:30 p.m. Eastern Time, for a total of ten episodes.

== Man Trouble ==
Four episodes of Fay ("Jack Remarries", "Mr. Wonderful", "Danny Falls In Love", and "Not Another Mother's Day") eventually were re-edited into an overseas theatrical feature, Man Trouble. Man Trouble later was included in a syndicated package of other MCA/Universal "movies" stitched together from episodes of various short-lived television series.

== Episodes ==
No.	Title	Directed by	Written by	Original release date
1	"Fay"	Alan Arkin	Susan Harris	September 4, 1975
Fay admits to having an affair.
2	"Jack Remarries"	Alan Arkin	Susan Harris	September 11, 1975
Fay's ex-husband Jack is marrying a young stewardess.
3	"Mom's Realization"	Richard Kinon	Gail Parent	September 18, 1975
Fay's mother wants to bring her and Jack back together.
4	"Mr. Wonderful"	Unknown	Dick Clair & Jenna McMahon	September 25, 1975
Fay's childhood friend (Renée Taylor) is getting married, but her intended begins making passes at Fay.
5	"Jack's Heart Attack"	Unknown	Susan Harris	October 2, 1975
Thinking he's dying of a heart attack, Jack confesses to Fay about his cheating ways.
6	"Not with My Husband You Don't"	James Burrows	S : Jerry Mayer; T : Susan Harris & Sybil Adelman and Jerry Mayer	October 9, 1975
Fay is ecstatic at the prospect of accompanying one of her firm's attorneys to Washington, D.C.
7	"Lillian's Separation"	James Burrows	S : Dennis Klein; T : Susan Harris & Sybil Adelman	October 16, 1975
Lillian walks out on her husband (Norman Fell) and moves into Fay's apartment, where she does some unwanted redecorating.
8	"Danny Falls in Love"	Unknown	S : Max Pisk; T : Susan Harris	October 23, 1975
Fay's lovelorn boss Danny (Bill Gerber) comes to her apartment for some motherly comfort.
9	"Fay and the Doctor"	Richard Kinon	Susan Harris	May 12, 1976
Fay falls in love with a doctor; the only problem is he is married with children.
10	"Not Another Mother's Day"	Joan Darling	Jerry Mayer	June 2, 1976
Linda wants to wait until she graduates from college to have a second child, but her husband doesn't want to wait that long.
