= Joe Silver =

American actor

- Publicity photo
- Born: Joseph Silver; September 28, 1922; Chicago, Illinois, U.S.
- Died: February 27, 1989 (aged 66); New York City, U.S.
- Education: University of Wisconsin
- Occupation: Actor
- Years active: 1942–1989
- Spouse: Chevi Colton (m. 1950)
- Children: 2

Joe Silver (September 28, 1922 – February 27, 1989) was an American stage, television, film and radio actor. His distinctive deep voice was once described as "the lowest voice in show business; so low that when he speaks, he unties your shoelaces."

== Biography ==
He was born on September 28, 1922, in Chicago, the son of Morris Silver (1887–1943) and Sonja Silver (1893–1976). He was raised in Green Bay, Wisconsin and attended Green Bay East High School and the University of Wisconsin.

Silver made his Broadway debut in 1942 in a revival of Tobacco Road. He was in the original production of Gypsy: A Musical Fable (1959) and was nominated for a Tony Award as a supporting actor for playing nine different roles in Lenny (1971).

In 1947, he made the first of more than 1,000 appearances on television, as a panelist on What's It Worth. Two years later, he became a member of the cast of the CBS educational children's television show Mr. I. Magination. In 1950, he appeared on the short-lived variety show Joey Faye's Frolics. In 1950 he also married Evelyn (Chevi) Colton.

He was featured on The Red Buttons Show in the 1950s, and was the second Captain Jet, host of the children's show Space Funnies in the late 1950s. He played the husband of star Lee Grant's character on Fay in the 1975-1976 season.

His film credits include Diary of a Bachelor (1964), Move (1970), Rhinoceros (1974), The Apprenticeship of Duddy Kravitz (1974), Shivers (1975), Rabid (1977), You Light Up My Life (1977), Crash (1978), Boardwalk (1979), Deathtrap (1982), Almost You (1985) and Switching Channels (1988). He also provided the voice of the ox in the 1970 Christmas special The Night the Animals Talked and as The Creep in the horror anthology film Creepshow 2 (1987). He also provided the speaking and singing voices of the Greedy in Raggedy Ann & Andy: A Musical Adventure (1977).

Silver's last performance was in the musical Legs Diamond.

While suffering from liver cancer, Silver died in Manhattan after suffering a heart attack at the age of 66 on February 27, 1989. He was survived by his actress wife Chevi Colton, their son Christopher, their daughter Jennifer, and three grandchildren.

== Filmography ==
=== Film ===
Joe Silver film credits
Year	Title	Role	Notes
1964	Diary of a Bachelor	Charlie Barrett	
1970	Move	Oscar	
1971	Klute	Dr. Spangler	Uncredited
1974	Rhinoceros	Norman	
1974	The Apprenticeship of Duddy Kravitz	Farber	
1975	Shivers	Rollo Linsky	
1977	Raggedy Ann & Andy: A Musical Adventure	The Greedy	Voice
1977	Rabid	Murray Cypher	
1977	You Light Up My Life	Si Robinson	
1979	Boardwalk	Leo Rosen	
1982	Deathtrap	Seymour Starger	
1985	Almost You	Uncle Stu	
1985	The Gig	Abe Mitgang	
1987	Creepshow 2	The Creep	Voice
1987	Magic Sticks	Pawnbroker	
1987	Mr. Nice Guy	Leser Tish	
1988	Switching Channels	Mordsini	

=== Television ===
Joe Silver television credits
Year	Title	Role	Notes
1950	Joey Faye's Frolics	(regular cast)	
1950	Mr. I. Magination	Servant	1 episode
1952-1955	The Red Buttons Show	(regular cast)	1 episode
1972	Gunsmoke	Beal Brown	Episode "The Brothers"
1975-1976	Fay	Jack Steward	8 episodes
1976	Kojak	Chief Wilson	Episode "An Unfair Trade"
1978	Crash	Alvin Jessop	TV movie
1980-1983	Sesame Street	Arnold Hooper	5 episodes
1985	The Equalizer	Felix Dzershinsky	Episode: "The Defector"
