= Paula Stewart =

American actress

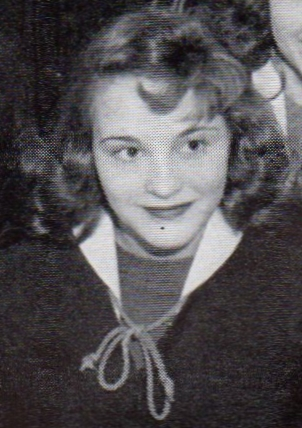
- Stewart at Shimer College in 1946
- Born: Dorothy Paula Zürndorfer; April 9, 1929 (age 97)
- Education: Shimer College, Northwestern University
- Occupation: Actress
- Years active: 1954–present
- Spouses: Burt Bacharach (m. 1953; div. 1958) Jack Carter (m. 1961; div. 1970)
- Children: Michael David Carter
- Website: Official Website

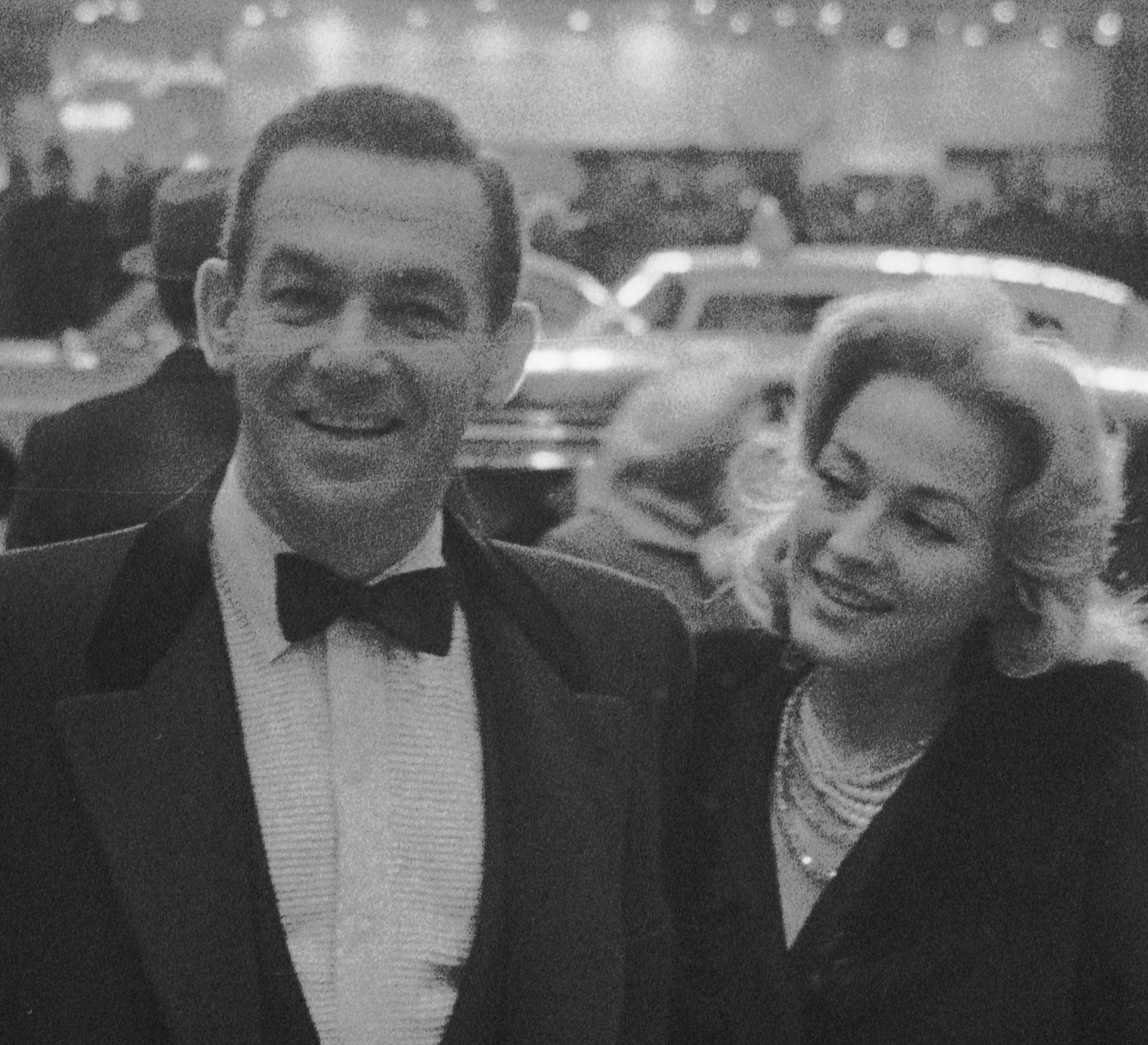
Jack Carter and Paula Stewart in 1959

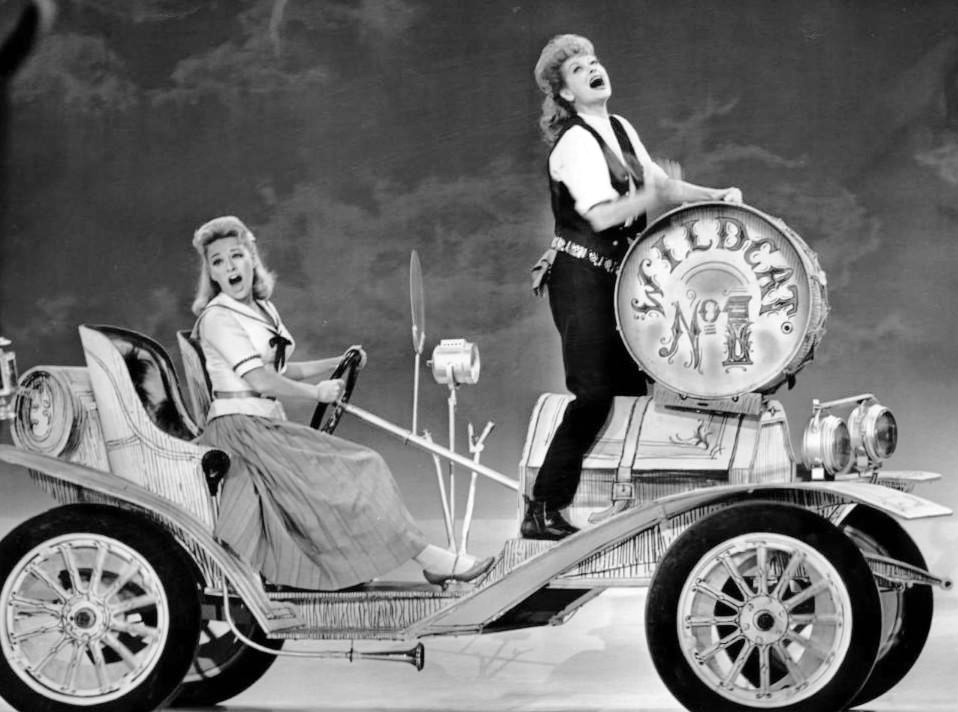
Paula Stewart and Lucille Ball singing "Hey, Look Me Over" from Broadway musical Wildcat (1961)

Paula Stewart (born Dorothy Paula Zürndorfer, April 9, 1929) is an American stage, film and television actress mostly known for performing in bit parts and supporting roles.

== Early years ==
Stewart's father was Dr. Walter Zürndorfer and her mother, Esther Morris, was an actress. She attended Shimer College in Mount Carroll, Illinois, then a women's junior college, and graduated in 1947. She continued her studies at Northwestern University, and later joined the national touring company of Brigadoon.

== Career ==
Stewart was signed as understudy to Anne Crowley in a production of Seventeen on Broadway in June 1951. She starred in the George White revue Nice to See You in 1953 at the Versailles Club, a dinner theatre. In September 1955, Stewart, a soprano, began a month-long engagement with Kismet at the Music circus in Lambertville, New Jersey. She co-starred with Donald O'Connor in Little Me, Gordon MacRae and Howard Keel in Carousel, and Jack Carter in Operation Mad Ball, Born Yesterday and Critics Choice from 1956 to 1957. She starred in the revival of The Most Happy Fella in 1959.

In 1960, she was a featured player in the revue, From A to Z, starring Hermione Gingold. Later that year she appeared opposite Lucille Ball as her sister in the musical, Wildcat (1960) at the Alvin Theater. In 1961 she was featured in the Broadway musical Let It Ride starring George Gobel and Sam Levene at the Eugene O'Neill Theatre. In 1965, she appeared in What Makes Sammy Run?.

Stewart and Jack Carter performed together in theatres and nightclubs around the country and overseas for the USO in Germany. In New York City they performed at the prestigious Number One Fifth Avenue, The Versailles Club, The Empire Room at the Waldorf Astoria, The Starlight Room at The Americana Hotel; in Las Vegas at The El Rancho Vegas and The Flamingo; in Lake Tahoe at the Harrah's Hotel; and The La Ronde Room at The Fountainbleu Hotel and The Deauville, both in Miami, Florida.

== Photo model ==
Stewart did a two-page lingerie layout as a model for Picture Week in May 1956. She also appeared in a number of print ads including an ad for Cashmere Bouquet as well as an ad for Heublein Liquor in which she appeared with her then husband Jack Carter.

== Television ==
She appeared on episodes of Route 66 (1963), The Joey Bishop Show (1964), Hogan's Heroes (1965), Perry Mason (1965), My Favorite Martian (1966), The Big Valley (1966), and Love, American Style (1969). She made a television movie, Without Her Consent, in 1990.

== Films ==
Her first motion picture credit is for the role of Carlotta Jones in Diary of a Bachelor (1964). The independent film about a wealthy woman who discovers the diary of her bachelor fiancé stars William Traylor and Dagne Crane. Other films in which she appeared, albeit in bit parts, include Kemek (1970) and Suppose They Gave a War and Nobody Came? (1970)

== Marriages ==
Stewart married Burt Bacharach in 1953 during her run in Nice to See You at the Versailles Club. He was her accompanist and scored arrangements for her night club act. They divorced amicably in 1958. Stewart married comedian Jack Carter in 1961; they divorced in 1970. They had a son, Michael David Carter.

== Film producer ==
In 1970, Stewart produced the movie Dinah East, which was directed by Gene Nash and starred unknown actors Jeremy Stockwell and Andy Davis, as well as counterculture diva Ultra Violet.
