= Diary of a Bachelor =

1964 film by Sandy Howard

- Directed by: Sandy Howard
- Written by: Freddie Francis (Credited as "Ken Barnett")
- Starring: Joe Silver; Dom DeLuise; Arlene Golonka; Paula Stewart; William Traylor
- Music by: Jack Pleis
- Distributed by: American International Pictures
- Release date: September 18, 1964
- Running time: 87 minutes
- Country: United States
- Language: English

Diary of a Bachelor is a 1964 American comedy film directed by Sandy Howard and starring William Traylor, Joe Silver and Dagne Crane.

== Plot ==
Joanne, a young bride-to-be, has found the diary of her intended, Skip O'Hara, a man notorious for being a playboy. Sure that she'll read about his various exploits, she flips through the diary but is shocked to find that he is not exactly the type of person whom everyone believes him to be. She discovers that he has been having affairs with numerous young women and leaves Skip.

An airline hostess whose name appears often in the diary, Nancy Feather, arrives at Skip's apartment. Joanne decides to return to Skip and apologize, but when she finds Nancy with him, she leaves for good.

A year later, Skip and Nancy are married and Skip has settled down, but Nancy continues to see old boyfriends.

== Cast ==
- William Traylor as Skip O'Hara
- Joe Silver as Charlie Barrett
- Dagne Crane as Joanne
- Denise Lor as Jane Woods
- Jan Crockett as Jennifer Watters
- Susan Dean as Barbara
- Eleni Kiamos as Angie Pisano
- Arlene Golonka as Lois
- Joan Holloway as Nancy Feather
- Mickey Deems as Barney Washburn
- Paula Stewart as Carlotta Jones
- Dom DeLuise as Marvin Rollins
- Jackie Kannon as Bob Haney

== Reception ==
Critical reception has been mixed. TV Guide panned the film and gave it one star, stating "Told in a series of redundant flashbacks, the clumsy hand of producer/director Howard fails to keep interest for long. An unsympathetic character's life told in an uncaptivating style doesn't leave much room for praise." Variety also criticized the film as a "tame tale" with the byline "lack of names and generally pallid comedy make it candidate for second billing."
