= Mr. I. Magination =

American TV children's series (1949–1952)

- Country of origin: United States

Original release
- Network: CBS
- Release: 1949 – 1952

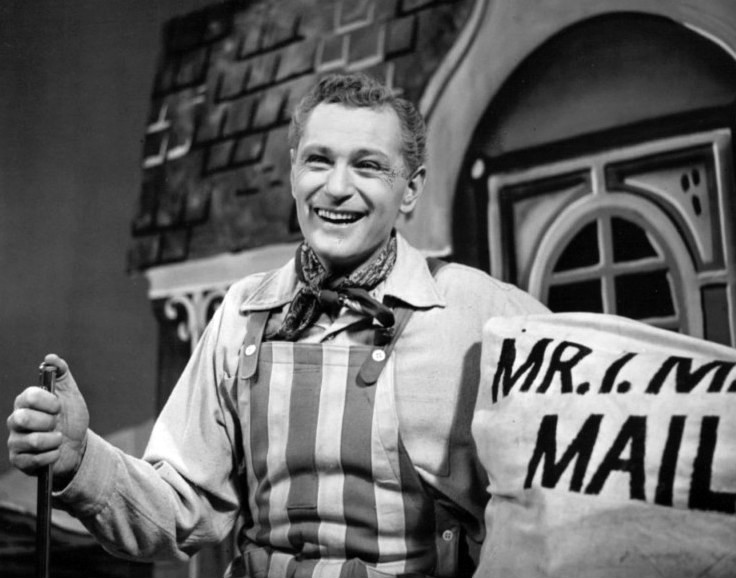
Paul Tripp as Mr. I. Magination

Mr. I. Magination is one of the earliest American television shows for children. It ran live as a half-hour weekly show on CBS from 1949 to 1952 and was broadcast from Grand Central Terminal in Manhattan. It debuted on May 29, 1949, and ended on June 38, 1952.

The host, Mr. I. Magination (Paul Tripp), dressed as a train engineer, gathered a group of children each week. The same child actors appeared on a rotating basis. Two would be selected to ask about a career, occupation, activity, and such. Tripp would then play a "magic" slide flute, then he and the children would board a train and travel to Imagination Land, where they would meet a professional from each of the two areas for that week's show.

Guests were as diverse as Damu, a lion tamer from Ringling Brothers Circus, and test pilot Scott Crossfield. Ruth Enders, Ted Tiller, and Joe Silver also acted in the show. The show was also a pioneer in using simple, early special effects, such as making it appear as if the opening train ride went through a tunnel to enter Imagination Land, emerging from the smoke from its engine.

Yul Brynner served as the director of the show at times, but did not appear as a performer. The show also featured performances by Walter Matthau, Richard Boone, Joe Silver, Ted Tiller, and Simon Oakland.

Mr. I. Magination also was featured on several RCA records for children, including Billy On A Bike and Mr. I. Magination Meets Rip Van Winkle; there are at least two versions on LP (long playing) record.

== Production ==
The producers were Worthington Miner, Irving Pincus, and Norman Pincus. Hugh Rogers was the director. Tripp and Ray Carter composed music for the show. The show was broadcast on Sundays in time slots that ranged from 6 - 6:30 p.m. Eastern Time to 7:30 - 8 p.m. E. T.

== Critical response ==
A review in The New York Times called the program "a thoroughly rewarding half hour for viewers, both young and old". The review said that Tripp's personality created an "infectious enthusiasm" on the show while avoiding "any trace of embarrassing precocity". It also described the overall production as being "of a high professional order".
