= Lillian Lehman =

American actress

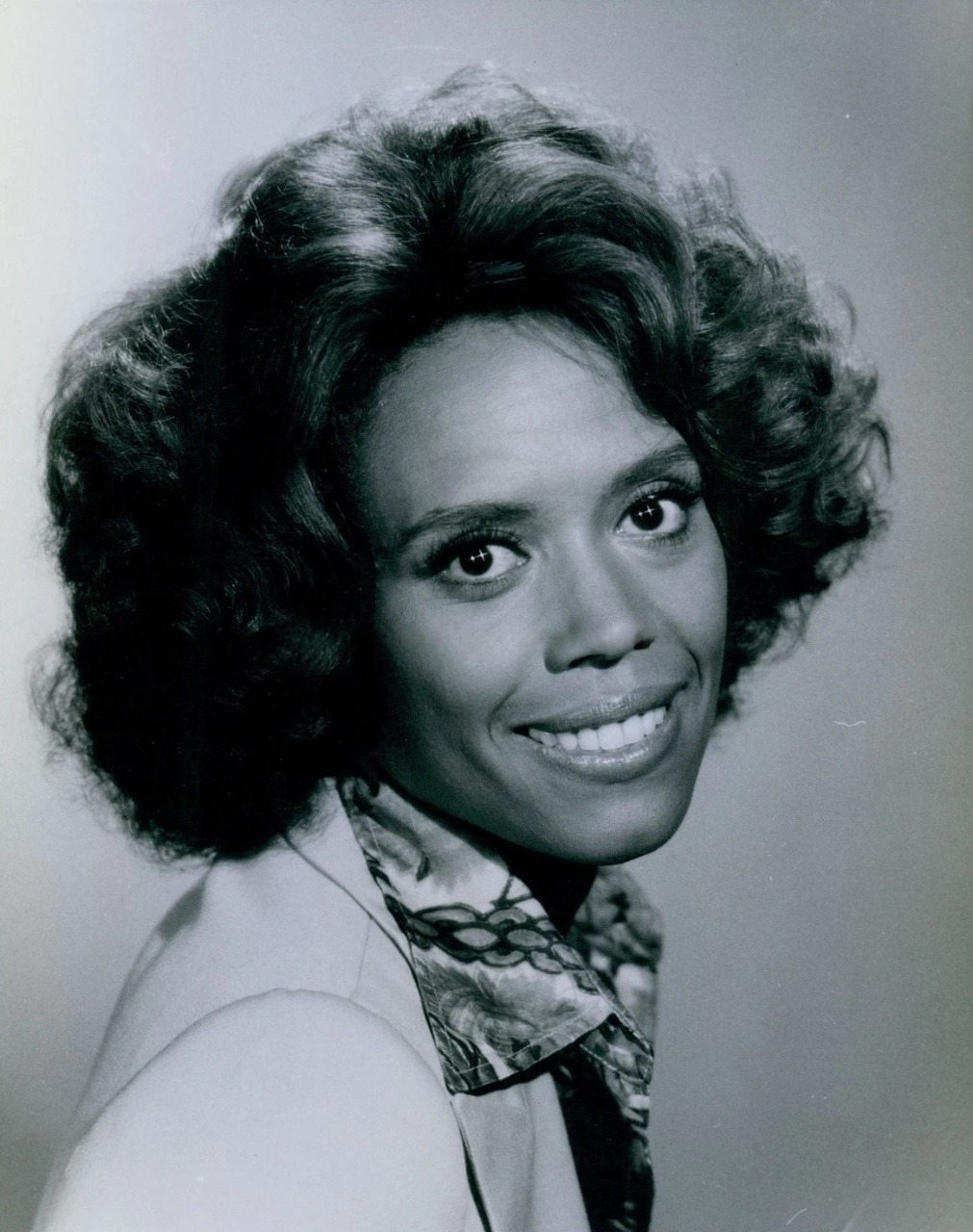
- Lehman in 1975
- Born: February 12, 1947 (age 79); Oak Hill, Alabama, U.S.
- Education: Kent State University
- Occupation: Actress
- Years active: 1968–present
- Spouse: John Amos (m. 1978; div. 1979)

Lillian Lehman (born February 12, 1947) is an American actress.

The daughter of a Lutheran minister, Lehman was born in Oak Hill, Alabama, but moved with her family to Buffalo, New York, when she was five years old. She was named actress of the year while she attended Kent State University.

Lehman played Lena Hart in NBC's soap opera Sunset Beach, nurse Carol Williams on Emergency!, Letty Gilmore on Fay, Ruth Tenafly on Tenafly, and Dr. Joyce Meadows on ABC's General Hospital. She has also been cast in various guest roles on TV.

Lehman is a professor emerita of theatre and graduate of California State University, Northridge, with a B.A. degree in theatre.

She has also acted in films, such as Defending Your Life and Evan Almighty. TV credits include Magnum P.I., General Hospital, ER, Cold Case, Seinfeld, Married... with Children, a recurring role as Judge Mary Harcourt on L.A. Law, a recurring role as Judge Tiano on The Closer and numerous other judge roles in The Division, Sparks, JAG, The Wayans Bros., Gabriel's Fire, Alfred Hitchcock Presents and others.

== Personal life ==
Lehman was married briefly to actor John Amos.
