= Wildcat (musical) =

1960 musical by Carolyn Leigh and Cy Coleman

- Original cast recording
- Music: Cy Coleman
- Lyrics: Carolyn Leigh
- Book: N. Richard Nash
- Productions: 1960 Broadway; 1963 Melbourne

Wildcat is a musical with a book by N. Richard Nash, lyrics by Carolyn Leigh, and music by Cy Coleman.

The original production opened on Broadway in 1960, starring a 49-year-old Lucille Ball in her only Broadway show.

The show introduced the song "Hey, Look Me Over", which was subsequently performed as a cover version by several musicians.

An original cast album was issued by RCA Victor.

== Background and production ==
Nash had envisioned the main character of Wildy as a woman in her late 20s, and was forced to rewrite the role when Lucille Ball expressed interest not only in playing it but financing the project as well. Desilu, the company owned by Ball and her soon-to-be ex-husband Desi Arnaz, ultimately invested $360,000 in the show in exchange for 36% of the net profits, the rights to the original cast recording (ultimately released by RCA Victor), and television rights for musical numbers to be included in a special titled Lucy Goes to Broadway, a project that eventually was scrapped. Ball also was permitted to choose her leading man. Kirk Douglas's salary demands and heavy film schedule eliminated him from the running, and Gordon MacRae, Jock Mahoney, and Gene Barry were considered before she selected Keith Andes. Michael Kidd, who co-produced with Nash, directed and choreographed, and he got songwriters Coleman and Leigh on board. It was Leigh's second Broadway production (following 1954's Peter Pan with Mary Martin) and Coleman's Broadway debut.

The Philadelphia tryout opened on October 29, 1960, to a glowing review from Variety, but local critics were less enthusiastic. The scheduled Broadway opening had to be postponed when trucks hauling the sets and costumes to New York were stranded on the New Jersey Turnpike for several days by a major blizzard. After two previews, the show opened on December 16 at the Alvin Theatre. The cast included Paula Stewart and Swen Swenson, with Valerie Harper among the chorus members. Vivian Vance, Ball's costar from I Love Lucy, was in the opening night audience and was photographed giving the star a congratulatory hug backstage after the show. Hampered by lukewarm reviews and Ball's lingering illness, it ran for only 171 performances.

Ball quickly realized audiences had come expecting to see her Lucy Ricardo persona and began mugging and ad-libbing to bring her characterization closer to that of the zany housewife she had portrayed in I Love Lucy. It was clearly Ball who was drawing the crowds, and when she fell ill and demands for refunds ran high, the producers announced plans to close the show for a week in late March 1961 to allow her to recover her strength. The closure came sooner than planned when Ball, suffering from a virus and chronic fatigue, departed for Florida on February 8. She returned two weeks later, but on April 22 she collapsed on stage. It was decided the show would close for nine weeks at the end of May and reopen once its star had recovered fully, but May 24 proved to be her final performance as the musicians' union insisted on members of the orchestra being paid during the shutdowns. This ultimately made it infeasible for the production to remain active, forcing it to close permanently on June 3, 1961.

Wildcat was Ball's only appearance in a Broadway production. She previously had been cast in the Bartlett Cormack play Hey Diddle Diddle, a comedy that premiered in Princeton, New Jersey on January 21, 1937. Ball played the part of Julie Tucker, "one of three roommates coping with neurotic directors, confused executives, and grasping stars who interfere with the girls' ability to get ahead." The play received good reviews, but there were problems, chiefly with its star Conway Tearle; the play was scheduled to open on Broadway at the Vanderbilt Theatre, but closed after one week in Washington, D.C., when Tearle suddenly became gravely ill.

The Australian production of Wildcat starring Toni Lamond opened at Princess Theatre, Melbourne on July 19, 1963. The production employed British actor Gordon Boyd and Canadian actress Norah Halliday to play Joe Dynamite and Janie, respectively, among a cast of 82 performers. The Australian production reinstated the cut song "Ain't It Sad, Ain't It Mean" as a duet for Wildcat and Sookie. The show closed September 14, 1963.

== Plot ==
Wildcat "Wildy" Jackson arrives in 1912 in Centavo City with dreams of striking oil but with neither capital nor know-how to help her accomplish her goal. Joe Dynamite, the most successful crew foreman in the territory, finds her ruggedness appealing and agrees to work with her if she can prove ownership to her claimed land and hire a crew. She finds 10 acres (40,000 m^{2}) owned by a hermit prospector, but Joe is certain the property is dry. Wildy attempts to lure him with her female charms, but when he still rejects her plans she has him falsely arrested, then released into her custody. A grateful Joe agrees to start work on the project but abandons it once he discovers it was Wildy who had him jailed. Left high and literally dry by her partner and crew, Wildy resorts to desperate measures to strike a Texas-sized gusher.

== Songs ==
Act I

- I Hear - Townspeople
- Hey, Look Me Over - Wildy and Jane
- Wildcat(*) - Wildy and Townspeople
- You've Come Home - Joe
- That's What I Want for Janie(*) - Wildy
- What Takes My Fancy - Wildy and Sookie
- You're a Liar - Wildy and Joe
- One Day We Dance - Hank and Jane
- Give a Little Whistle and I'll Be There - Wildy, Joe, The Crew and Townspeople
- Tall Hope - Tattoo, Oney, Sadie, Matt and Crew

(*) Song cut sometime after opening night.

Act II

- Tippy Tippy Toes - Wildy and Countess
- El Sombrero
- Corduroy Road
- You've Come Home (Reprise) - Joe

== Cast ==
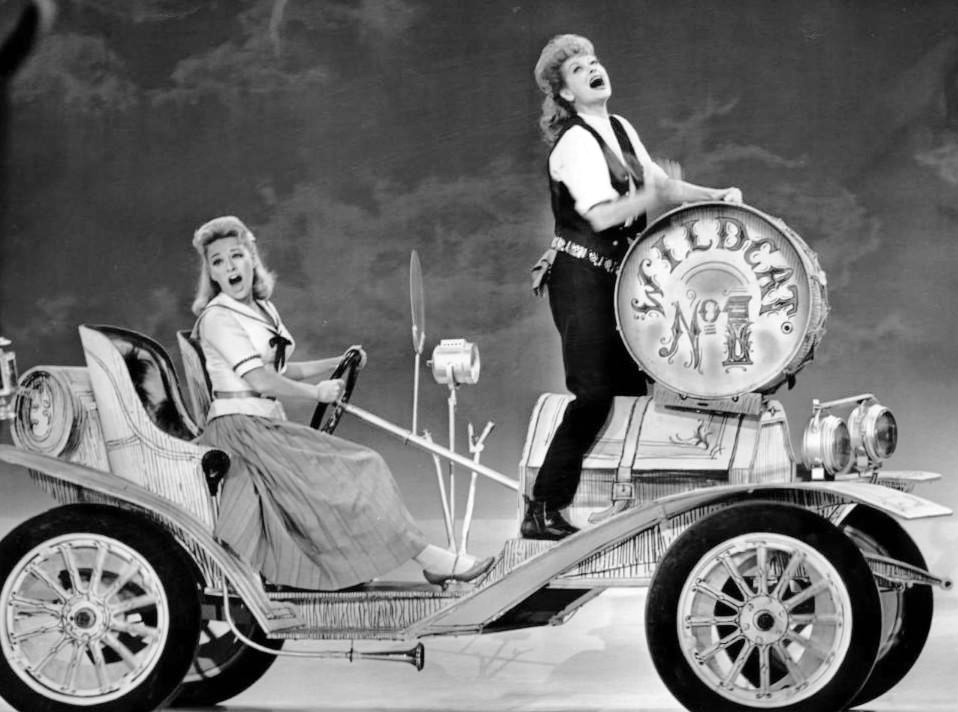
Lucille Ball and Paula Stewart singing "Hey, Look Me Over" on The Ed Sullivan Show, February 19, 1961

- Wildcat Jackson—Lucille Ball
- Jane Jackson—Paula Stewart
- Sheriff Sam Gore—Howard Fischer
- Barney—Ken Ayers
- Luke—Anthony Saverino
- Countess Emily O'Brien—Edith King
- Joe Dynamite—Keith Andes
- Hank—Clifford David
- Miguel—HF Green
- Sookie—Don Tomkins
- Matt—Charles Braswell
- Corky—Bill Linton
- Oney—Swen Swenson
- Sandy—Ray Mason
- Tattoo—Bill Walker
- Cisco—Al Lanti
- Postman—Bill Richards
- Inez—Marsha Wagner
- Blonde—Wendy Nickerson

== Bibliography ==
- Brady, Kathleen. "Lucille the Life of Lucille Ball" (2011) Open Road Integrated Media, ISBN 9781504023719
- Sanders, Coyne Steven and Gilbert, Tom. Desilu: The Story of Lucille Ball and Desi Arnaz (2003), William Morrow and Company, ISBN 0-688-13514-5, pp. 202–220
