= Lucille Ball =

American actress (1911–1989)

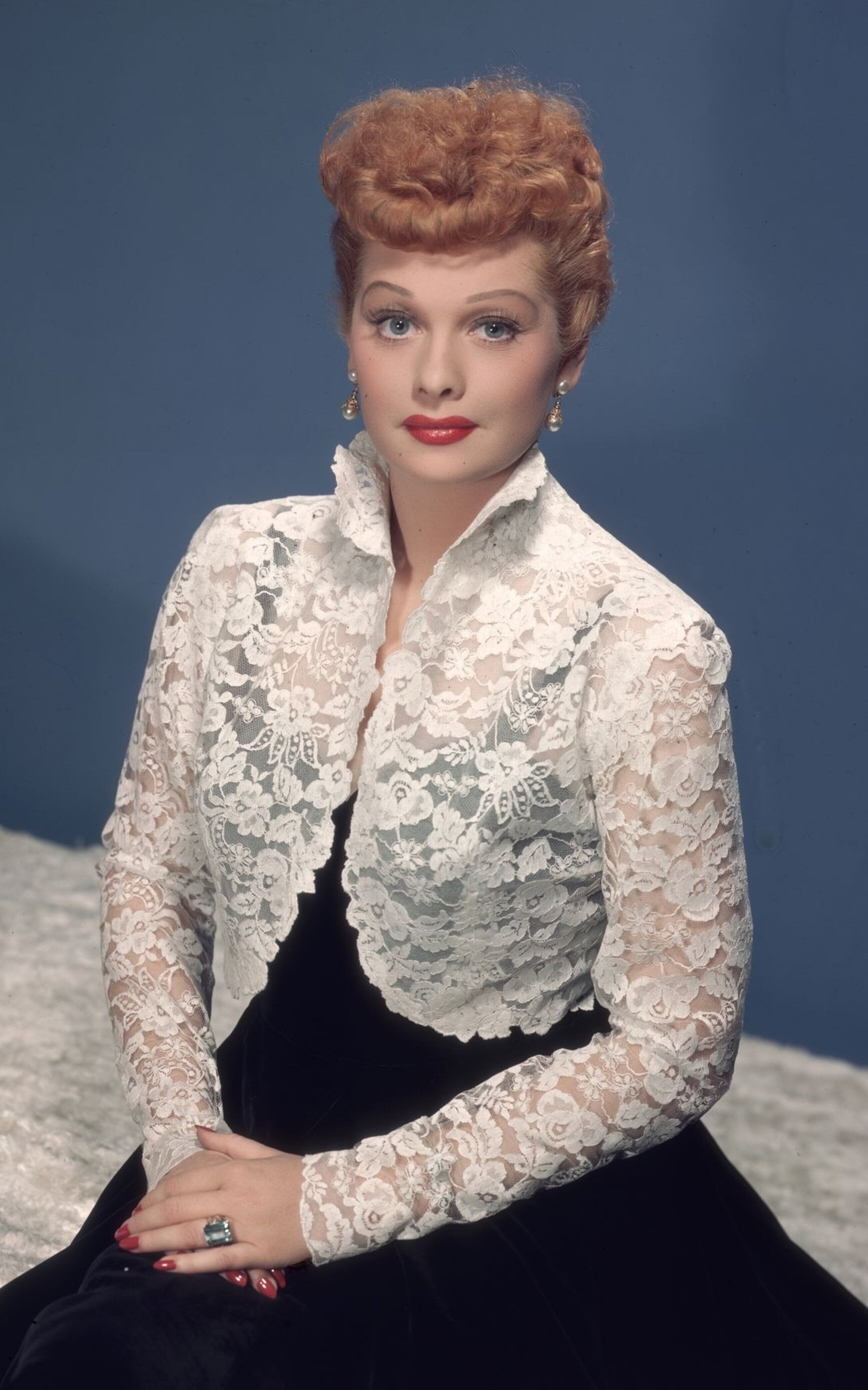
- Ball in 1955
- Born: Lucille Désirée Ball; August 6, 1911; Jamestown, New York, U.S.
- Died: April 26, 1989 (aged 77); Los Angeles, California, U.S.
- Burial place: Lake View Cemetery, Jamestown
- Occupations: Actress; comedian; producer; studio executive
- Years active: 1929–1989
- Works: Full list
- Spouses: Desi Arnaz (m. 1940; div. 1960); Gary Morton (m. 1961)
- Children: Lucie Arnaz; Desi Arnaz Jr.
- Relatives: Fred Ball (brother); Suzan Ball (cousin)

Lucille Désirée Ball (August 6, 1911 – April 26, 1989) was an American comedian, actress, producer, and studio executive. She was recognized by Time in 2020 as one of the most influential women of the 20th century for her work in all four of these areas. She was nominated for 13 Primetime Emmy Awards, winning five, and was the recipient of several other accolades, such as the Golden Globe Cecil B. DeMille Award and two stars on the Hollywood Walk of Fame. She earned many honors, including the Women in Film Crystal Award, an induction into the Television Hall of Fame, a Kennedy Center Honor, and the Governors Award from the Academy of Television Arts & Sciences. Additionally, she posthumously received the Presidential Medal of Freedom by President George H. W. Bush in 1989.

Ball's career began in 1929 when she landed work as a model. Shortly thereafter, she began her performing career on Broadway using the stage name Diane (or Dianne) Belmont. She later appeared in films in the 1930s and 1940s as a contract player for RKO Radio Pictures, being cast as a chorus girl or in similar roles, with lead roles in B-pictures and supporting roles in A-pictures.

During this time, she met Cuban bandleader Desi Arnaz, and they eloped in November 1940. In the 1950s, Ball ventured into television, where she and Arnaz created the sitcom I Love Lucy. She gave birth to their first child, Lucie, in 1951, followed by Desi Arnaz Jr. in 1953. They divorced in March 1960, and she married comedian Gary Morton in 1961.

Ball produced and starred in the Broadway musical Wildcat from 1960 to 1961. In 1962, she became the first woman to run a major television studio, Desilu Productions, which produced many popular television series, including Mission: Impossible and Star Trek. After Wildcat, she reunited with I Love Lucy co-star Vivian Vance for The Lucy Show, which Vance left in 1965. The show continued, with Ball's longtime friend and series regular Gale Gordon, until 1968. Ball immediately began appearing in a new series, Here's Lucy, with Gordon, frequent show guest Mary Jane Croft, and Lucie and Desi Jr.; this program ran until 1974.

Ball did not retire from acting completely, and in 1985 she took on a dramatic role in the television film Stone Pillow. The next year, she starred in Life with Lucy, which, unlike her other sitcoms, was not well-received; it was canceled after three months. She did not appear in film or television roles for the rest of her career and died in 1989, aged 77, from an abdominal aortic aneurysm brought about by arteriosclerotic heart disease. After her death, the American Comedy Awards were officially dubbed "The Lucy" after her.

== Early life ==
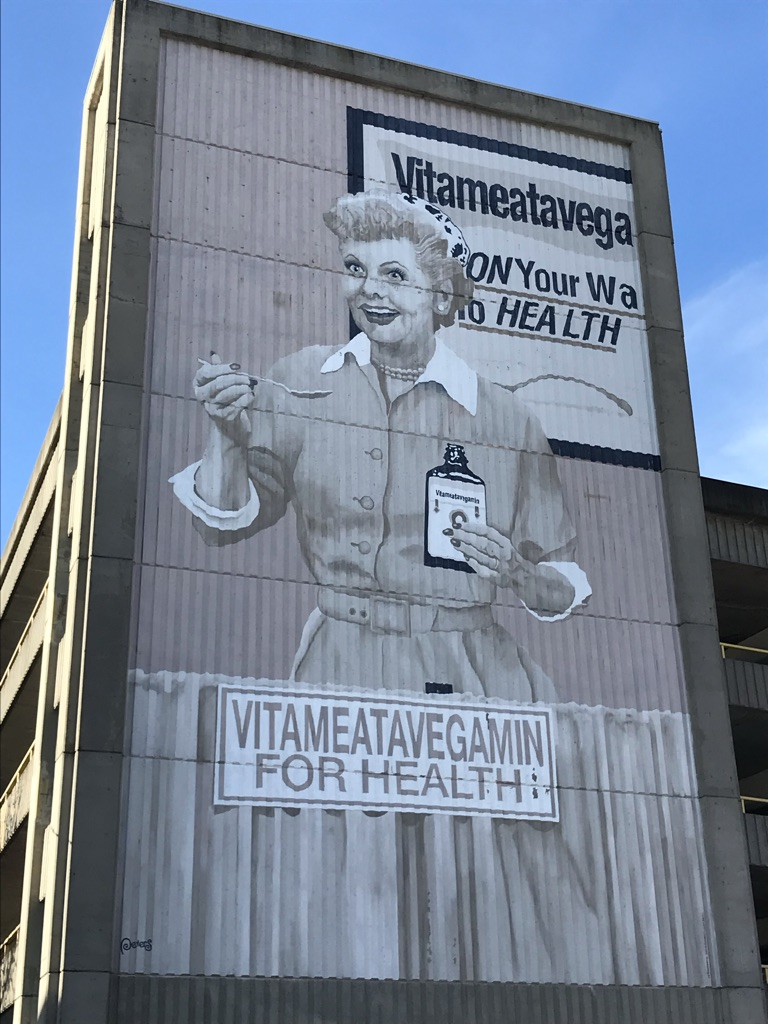
Painting of Lucille Ball on a downtown Jamestown parking garage, inspired by an I Love Lucy episode

Lucille Désirée Ball was born on Sunday, August 6, 1911, at 69 Stewart Avenue in Jamestown, New York, the first child and only daughter of Henry Durrell "Had" Ball, a lineman for Bell Telephone, and Désirée Evelyn "DeDe" (née Hunt) Ball. Her family belonged to the Baptist church. Her ancestors were mostly English, but a few were Scottish, French, and Irish. Some were among the earliest settlers in the Thirteen Colonies, including Elder John Crandall of Westerly, Rhode Island, and Edmund Rice, an early settler from England to the Massachusetts Bay Colony.

Her father's Bell Telephone career frequently required the family to move during Lucy's early childhood. The first was to Anaconda, Montana, and later to Trenton, New Jersey. On February 28, 1915, while living in Wyandotte, Michigan, Lucy's father died of typhoid fever aged 27, when Lucy was only three years old. At that time, DeDe was pregnant with her second child, Fred Ball (1915–2007). Lucille recalled little from the day her father died, except a bird getting trapped in the house, which caused her lifelong ornithophobia.

Ball's mother returned to New York, where maternal grandparents helped raise Lucy and her brother Fred in Celoron, a summer resort village on Chautauqua Lake. Their home was at 59 West 8th Street (later renamed Lucy Lane). Also living in the house were Ball's aunt and uncle, Lola and George Mandicos, and their daughter, Lucy's first cousin Cleo. Having grown up with Lucy, Cleo would later work as a producer on several of Lucy's radio and television programs, and Lucy also introduced Cleo to her second husband, the Los Angeles Times critic Cecil Smith.

Ball loved Celoron Park, a popular amusement area at the time. Its boardwalk had a ramp to the lake that served as a children's slide, the Pier Ballroom, a roller-coaster, a bandstand, and a stage where vaudeville concerts and plays were presented.

Four years after Henry Ball's death, DeDe married Edward Peterson. While they looked for work in another city, Peterson's parents cared for Lucy and Fred. Ball's step-grandparents were a puritanical Swedish couple who banished all mirrors from the house except one over the bathroom sink. When Lucy was caught admiring herself in it, she was severely chastised for being vain. She later said that this period of time affected her deeply, and it lasted seven or eight years.

When Lucy was 12, her stepfather encouraged her to audition for his Shriners organization that needed entertainers for the chorus line of its next show. While Ball was onstage, she realized that performing was a great way to gain praise. In 1927, her family was forced to move to a small apartment in Jamestown after their house and furnishings were sold to settle a legal judgment.

== Career ==
=== Early career ===
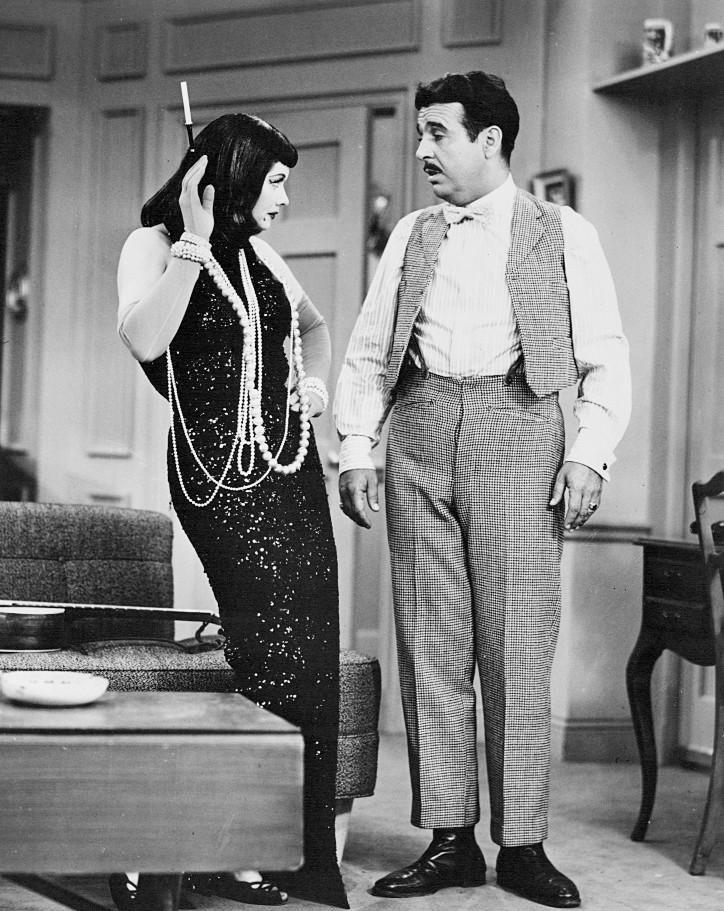
Ball with Tennessee Ernie Ford (1954)

In 1925, Ball, then only 14, started dating Johnny DeVita, a 21-year-old local hoodlum. Her mother was unhappy with the relationship, and hoped the romance, which she was unable to influence, would burn out. After about a year, her mother tried to separate them by exploiting Ball's desire to be in show business. Despite the family's meager finances, in 1926, she enrolled Ball in the John Murray Anderson School for the Dramatic Arts, in New York City, where Bette Davis was a fellow student. Ball later said about that time in her life, "All I learned in drama school was how to be frightened." Ball's instructors felt she would not be successful in the entertainment business, and were unafraid to directly state this to her.

In the face of this harsh criticism, Ball was determined to prove her teachers wrong and returned to New York City in 1928. That same year, she began working for Hattie Carnegie as an in-house model. Carnegie ordered Ball to bleach her brown hair blond, and she complied. Of this time in her life, Ball said: "Hattie taught me how to slouch properly in a $1,000 hand-sewn sequin dress and how to wear a $40,000 sable coat as casually as rabbit."

Her acting forays were stilled at an early stage when she became ill with rheumatic fever and was unable to work for two years.

=== 1930s ===
In 1932, she moved back to New York City to resume her pursuit of an acting career, where she supported herself by again working for Carnegie and as the Chesterfield cigarette girl. Using the name Diane (sometimes spelled Dianne) Belmont, she started getting chorus work on Broadway, but it did not last. Ball was hired — but then quickly fired — by theater impresario Earl Carroll from his Vanities, and by Florenz Ziegfeld Jr. from a touring company of Rio Rita.

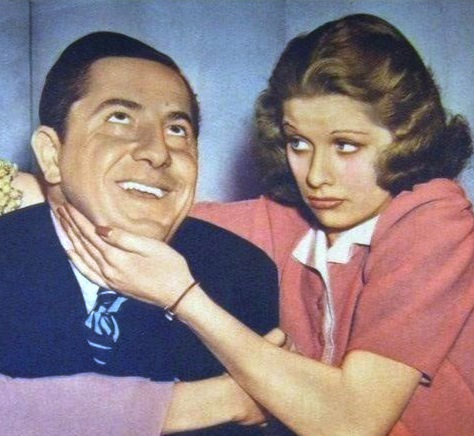
Ball with Joe Penner in Go Chase Yourself, a 1938 RKO film in which she played second lead to Penner

After an uncredited stint as a Goldwyn Girl in Roman Scandals (1933), starring Eddie Cantor and Gloria Stuart, Ball moved permanently to Hollywood to appear in films. She had many small movie roles in the 1930s as a contract player for RKO Radio Pictures, including a two-reel comedy short with The Three Stooges (Three Little Pigskins, 1934) and a movie with the Marx Brothers (Room Service, 1938). Her first credited role came in Chatterbox in 1936. She also appeared in several Fred Astaire and Ginger Rogers RKO musicals: as one of the featured models in Roberta (1935), as the flower shop clerk in Top Hat (1935), and in a brief supporting role at the beginning of Follow the Fleet (1936). Ball played a larger part as an aspiring actress alongside Ginger Rogers, who was a distant maternal cousin, and Katharine Hepburn in the film Stage Door (1937).

In 1936, she landed the role she hoped would lead her to Broadway, in the Bartlett Cormack play Hey Diddle Diddle, a comedy set in a duplex apartment in Hollywood. The play premiered in Princeton, New Jersey, on January 21, 1937, with Ball playing the part of Julie Tucker, "one of three roommates coping with neurotic directors, confused executives, and grasping stars, who interfere with the girls' ability to get ahead". The play received good reviews, but problems existed with star Conway Tearle, who was in poor health. Cormack wanted to replace him, but producer Anne Nichols said the fault lay with the character and insisted the part needed to be rewritten. Unable to agree on a solution, the play closed after one week in Washington, D.C., when Tearle became gravely ill.

Like many budding actresses, Ball picked up radio work to supplement her income and gain exposure. In 1937, she appeared regularly on The Phil Baker Show. When its run ended in 1938, Ball joined the cast of The Wonder Show starring Jack Haley. There began her 50-year professional relationship with the show's announcer, Gale Gordon. The Wonder Show lasted one season, with the final episode airing on April 7, 1939.

=== 1940s ===
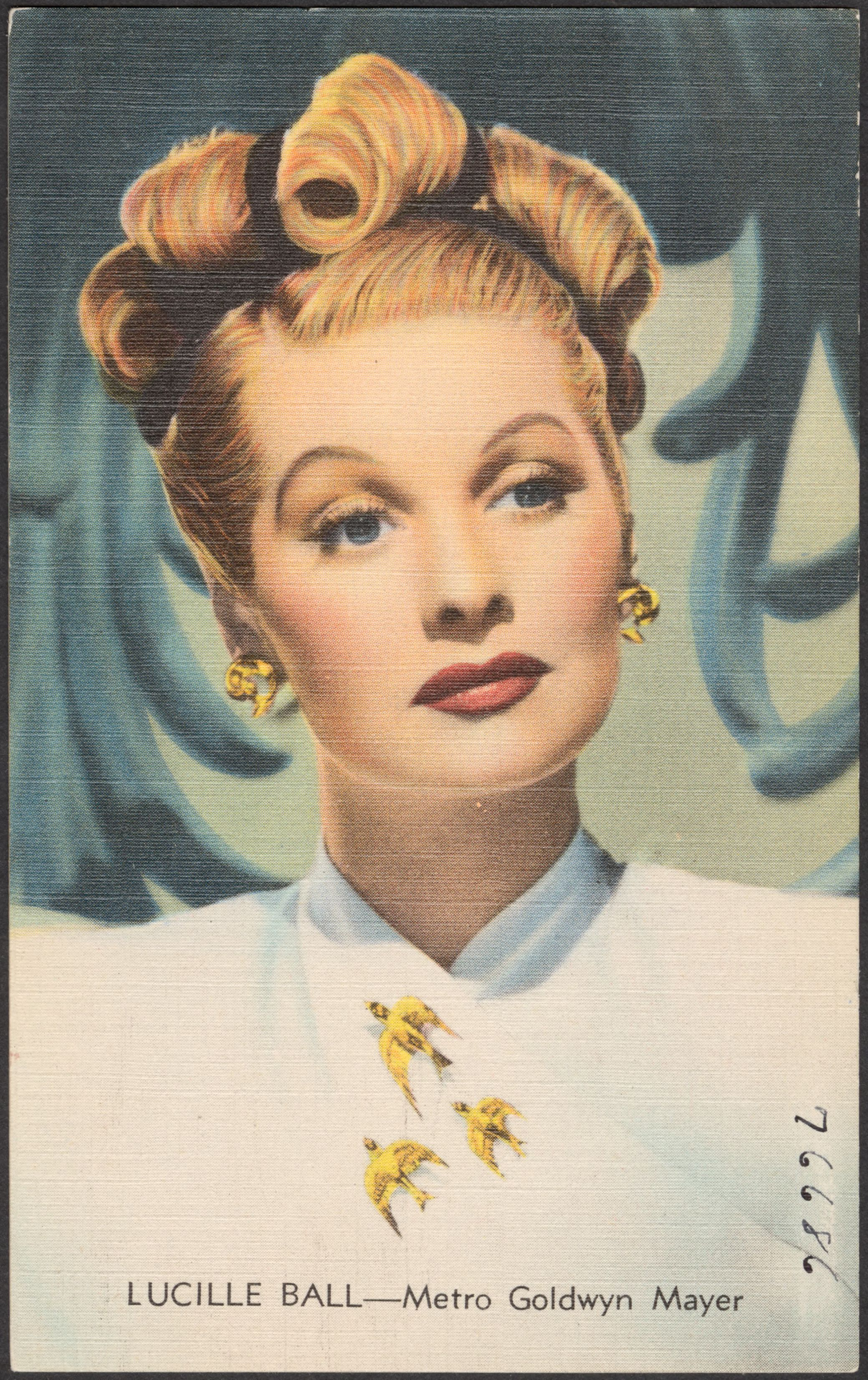
Metro-Goldwyn-Mayer postcard

During Ball's time at MGM in the 1940s, silent film star Buster Keaton and director Edward Sedgwick became her friends and comedic mentors, sharing their experiences with practical comedy and prop work. In 1940, Ball starred in Dance, Girl, Dance and appeared as the lead in the musical Too Many Girls, where she met and fell in love with Cuban bandleader Desi Arnaz, who played one of her character's four bodyguards in the movie. Ball signed with Metro-Goldwyn-Mayer in the 1940s, but never achieved major stardom there. She was known in Hollywood circles as "Queen of the Bs (B-movies)" – a title previously held by Fay Wray and later more closely associated with Ida Lupino and Marie Windsor – starring in a number of B-movies, such as Five Came Back (1939).

In 1942, Ball starred opposite Henry Fonda in The Big Street. MGM producer Arthur Freed purchased the Broadway hit musical play Du Barry Was a Lady (1943) especially for Ann Sothern, but when she turned down the part, that role went to Ball, Sothern's real-life best friend. In 1943, Ball portrayed herself in Best Foot Forward. In 1945, she appeared in a brief but prominent role in a dance sequence in Ziegfeld Follies. In 1946, Ball starred in Lover Come Back and the film noir The Dark Corner. In 1947, she appeared in the murder mystery Lured as Sandra Carpenter, a taxi dancer in London. In 1948, Ball was cast as Liz Cooper, a wacky wife in My Favorite Husband, a radio comedy for CBS Radio. (At first, the character's name was Liz Cugat; this was changed because of confusion with real-life bandleader Xavier Cugat, who sued.)

=== 1950s ===
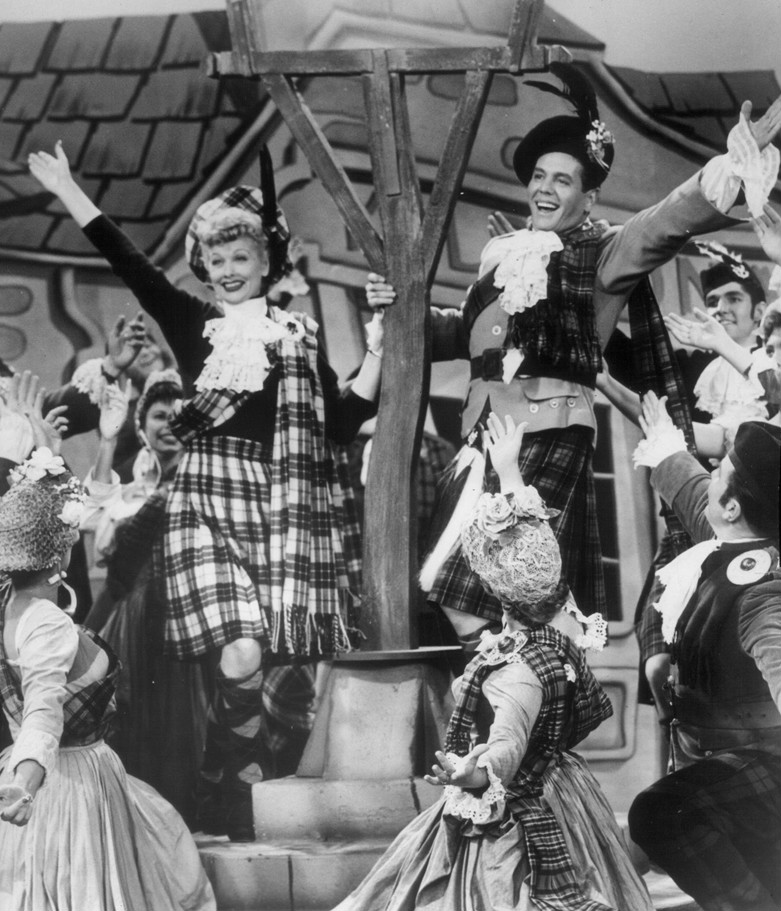
A scene from the I Love Lucy episode "Lucy Goes to Scotland", 1956

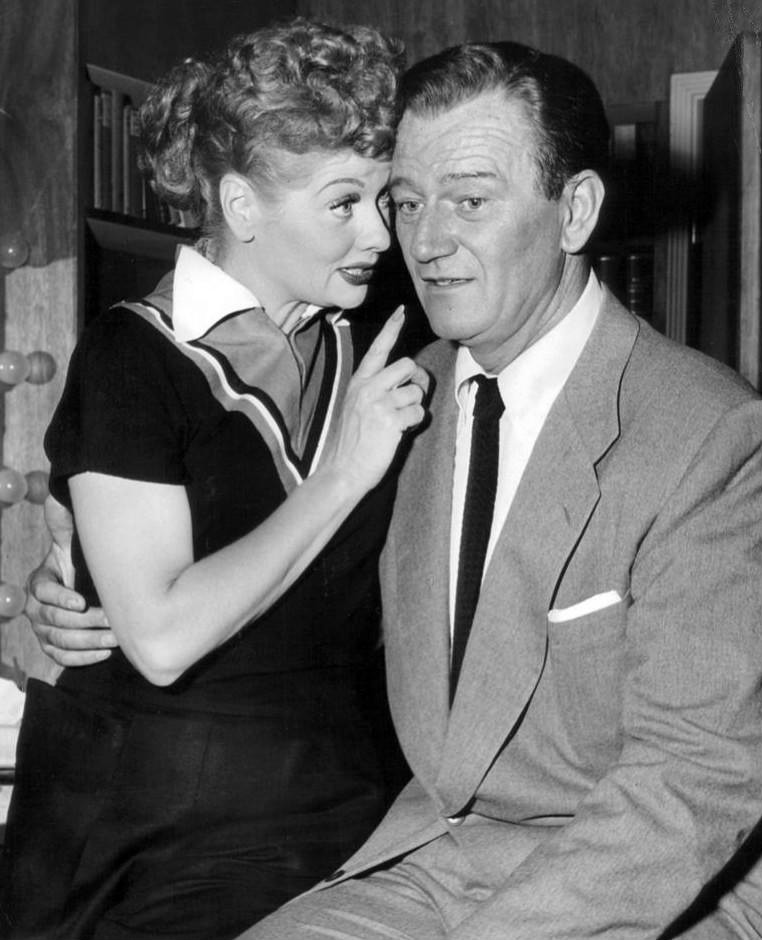
With John Wayne in I Love Lucy, 1955

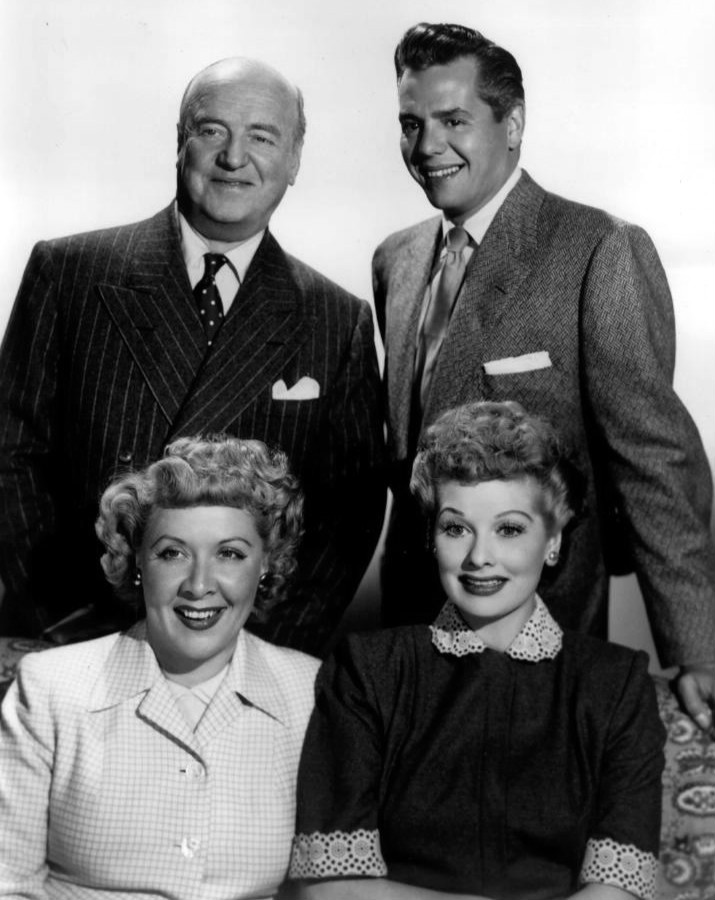
Cast of I Love Lucy with William Frawley, Desi Arnaz, and Vivian Vance

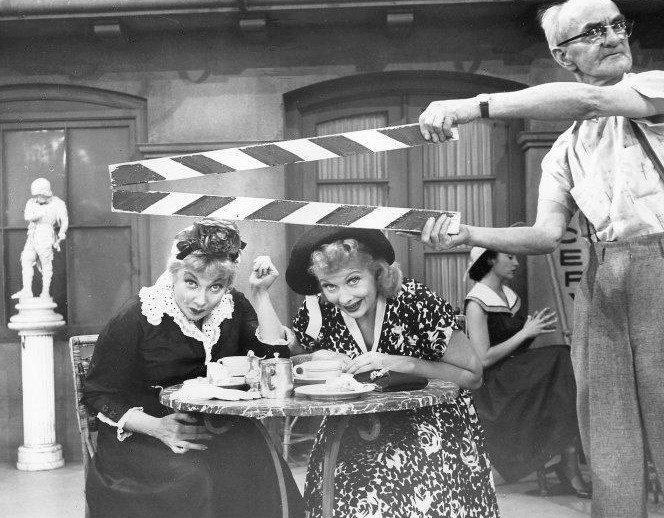
Ann Sothern and Ball during 1957

My Favorite Husband was successful, and CBS asked Ball to develop it for television. She agreed, but insisted on working with her real-life husband, Arnaz. CBS executives were reluctant, thinking the public would not accept an Anglo-American redhead and a Cuban as a couple. CBS was initially unimpressed with the pilot episode, produced by the couple's Desilu Productions company. The pair went on the road with a vaudeville act, in which Lucy played the zany housewife who wants to get into Cuban bandleader Arnaz's show. The tour was a hit, and CBS put I Love Lucy into their lineup. (My Favorite Husband was later adapted for TV, debuting on September 12, 1953, with Joan Caulfield in the role that Ball had on radio.)

I Love Lucy ran on CBS from October 15, 1951, to May 6, 1957, and was not only a star vehicle for Lucille Ball, but also a potential means for her to salvage her marriage to Arnaz. Their relationship had become badly strained, in part because of their hectic performing schedules, which often kept them apart, but mostly due to Desi's attraction to other women.

For the production of I Love Lucy, Ball and Arnaz wanted to remain in Los Angeles, but prime time in the western time zone was too late to air a major network series live in other time zones. Broadcasting live from California would also have meant giving most of the TV audience an inferior kinescope picture (the live program being filmed off a TV monitor), delayed by at least a day. Sponsor Philip Morris wanted the couple to relocate to New York, not wanting day-old kinescopes airing in major eastern markets, nor did they want to pay the extra costs that filming, processing, and editing would require.

Instead, Arnaz and Ball offered to take a pay cut to remain in Hollywood, and they would finance the filming themselves on better-quality 35 mm film, on the condition that Desilu would retain the rights of each episode after it aired. CBS agreed to relinquish the post-first-broadcast rights to Desilu, not realizing they were giving up a valuable and enduring asset; broadcast executives then expected a program to be aired only once, in the radio tradition, with no thought of rebroadcasts. (Network reruns did not come into being until the summer of 1952, when NBC aired repeats of Groucho Marx's You Bet Your Life in prime time.) Desi Arnaz correctly reasoned that the I Love Lucy episodes could be sold and resold as more TV stations sprang up across America. In 1957, CBS bought back the rights for $1,000,000 ($11.5 million in today's terms), financing Ball and Arnaz's down payment for the purchase of the former RKO Radio Pictures studios, which they turned into Desilu Studios.

I Love Lucy dominated U.S. ratings for most of its run. An attempt was made to adapt the show for radio using the "Breaking the Lease" episode (in which the Ricardos and Mertzes argue, and the Ricardos threaten to move, but find themselves stuck in a firm lease) as the pilot. The resulting radio audition disc has survived, but never aired.

A scene in which Lucy and Ricky practice the tango, in the episode "Lucy Does The Tango", evoked the longest recorded studio audience laugh in the history of the show — so long that the sound editor had to cut that section of the soundtrack in half. During the show's production breaks, Lucy and Desi starred together in two feature films: The Long, Long Trailer (1954) and Forever, Darling (1956). Many older feature films with Ball and/or Arnaz were also re-released in the mid-1950s to capitalize on the popularity of I Love Lucy.

After I Love Lucy ended its run in 1957, the main cast continued to appear in occasional hourlong specials under the title The Lucy–Desi Comedy Hour until 1960.

Along the way, Lucille Ball created a television dynasty and achieved several firsts. She was the first woman to head a TV production company, Desilu, which she had formed with Arnaz. After their divorce in 1960, she bought out his share and became a very actively engaged studio head. Desilu and I Love Lucy pioneered a number of methods still in use in TV production today, such as filming before a live studio audience with more than one camera, and distinct sets, adjacent to each other. During this time, Ball taught a 32-week comedy workshop at the Brandeis-Bardin Institute. She stated, "You cannot teach someone comedy; either they have it or they don't."

Desilu produced several other popular shows, such as The Untouchables, Star Trek, and Mission: Impossible. Ball sold her shares of the studio to Gulf+Western in 1967 for $17,000,000 ($164 million in today's dollars), and it was renamed Paramount Television.

=== 1960s and 1970s ===
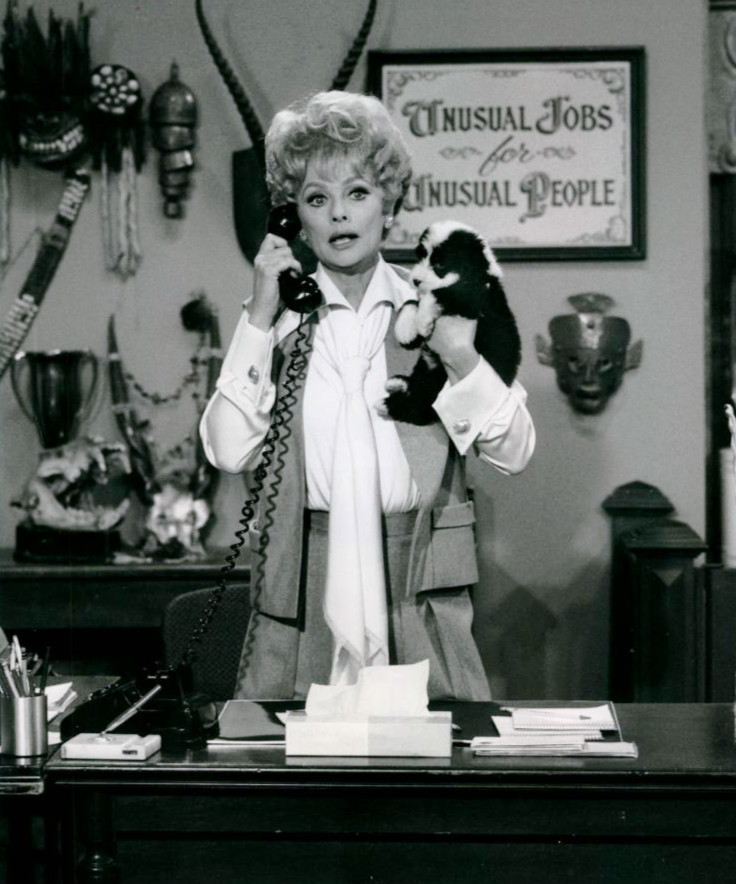
Here's Lucy, 1969

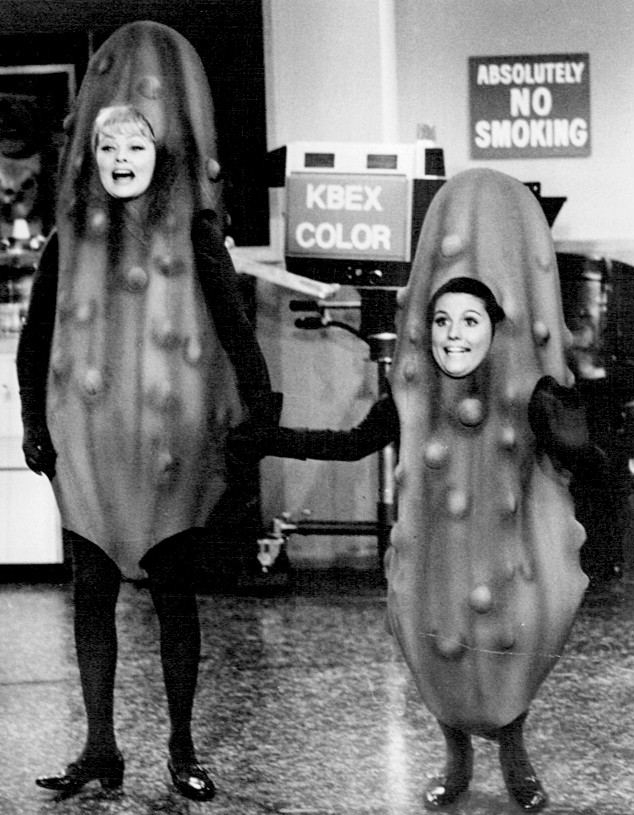
Here's Lucy, 1973

The 1960 Broadway musical Wildcat ended its run early when producer and star Ball could not recover from a virus and continue the show after several weeks of returned ticket sales. The show was the source of the song she made famous, "Hey, Look Me Over", which she performed with Paula Stewart on The Ed Sullivan Show.

In 1964 Lucille Ball announced her return to network radio: "The CBS people have persuaded me to take over Garry Moore's old radio spot. They want to call it Let's Talk to Lucy. Gary [Morton] will produce the series and I'll have my sister Cleo Smith on with me frequently. We'll be talking to Hollywood personalities or anyone we run into who seems interesting." She also welcomed the opportunity to appear before the public as herself, not in her comedy character. The 10-minute weekday show made its debut on Monday, September 7, 1964, with premiere-week guests Danny Kaye, Bob Hope, and Red Skelton. Ball gave up the show in August 1965, as reported by Kay Gardella in the New York Daily News: "Lucille Ball gives her CBS Radio series Let's Talk to Lucy the bounce after August 6. Her daily spot will be turned back to local stations." Ball had stockpiled enough recordings for the show to complete its run on August 27, 1965. CBS aired repeats of Let's Talk to Lucy through April 1967.

She also made a few more movies including Yours, Mine, and Ours (1968), and the musical Mame (1974), and two more successful long-running sitcoms for CBS: The Lucy Show (1962–68), which costarred Vivian Vance and Gale Gordon, and Here's Lucy (1968–74), which also featured Gordon, as well as Lucy's real-life children, Lucie Arnaz and Desi Arnaz, Jr. She appeared on the Dick Cavett show in 1974 and discussed her work on I Love Lucy, and reminisced about her family history, the friends she missed from show business, and how she learned to be happy while married. She also told a story about how she helped discover an underground Japanese radio signal after accidentally picking up the signal on the fillings in her teeth.

Ball's close friends in the business included perennial co-star Vivian Vance and film stars Judy Garland, Ann Sothern, and Ginger Rogers, and comedic television performers Jack Benny, Barbara Pepper, Ethel Merman, Mary Wickes, and Mary Jane Croft; all except Garland appeared at least once on her various series. Former Broadway co-stars Keith Andes and Paula Stewart also appeared at least once on her later sitcoms, as did Joan Blondell, Rich Little, and Ann-Margret. Ball mentored actress and singer Carole Cook, and befriended Barbara Eden, when Eden appeared on an episode of I Love Lucy. Ball was originally considered by Frank Sinatra for the role of Mrs. Iselin in the Cold War thriller The Manchurian Candidate. Director/producer John Frankenheimer, however, had worked with Angela Lansbury in a mother role in All Fall Down, and insisted on having her for the part.

In 1979, Ball signed a deal with NBC under Fred Silverman's watch after 28 years of working with CBS in order to deal with new comedy specials, but only one was aired as part of an agreement.

Ball was the lead actress in a number of comedy television specials to about 1980, including Lucy Calls the President, which featured Vivian Vance, Gale Gordon, and Mary Jane Croft, and Lucy Moves to NBC, a special depicting a fictionalization of her move to the NBC television network. In 1959, Ball became a friend and mentor to Carol Burnett. She guested on Burnett's highly successful CBS-TV special Carol + 2 and the younger performer reciprocated by appearing on The Lucy Show. Ball was rumored to have offered Burnett a chance to star on her own sitcom, but in truth, Burnett was offered (and declined) Here's Agnes by CBS executives. She instead chose to create her own variety show due to a stipulation that was on an existing contract she had with CBS. The two women remained close friends until Ball's death on April 26, 1989, which was Carol's birthday. Ball sent flowers every year on Burnett's birthday.

Aside from her acting career, Ball became an assistant professor at California State University, Northridge in 1979.

=== 1980s ===
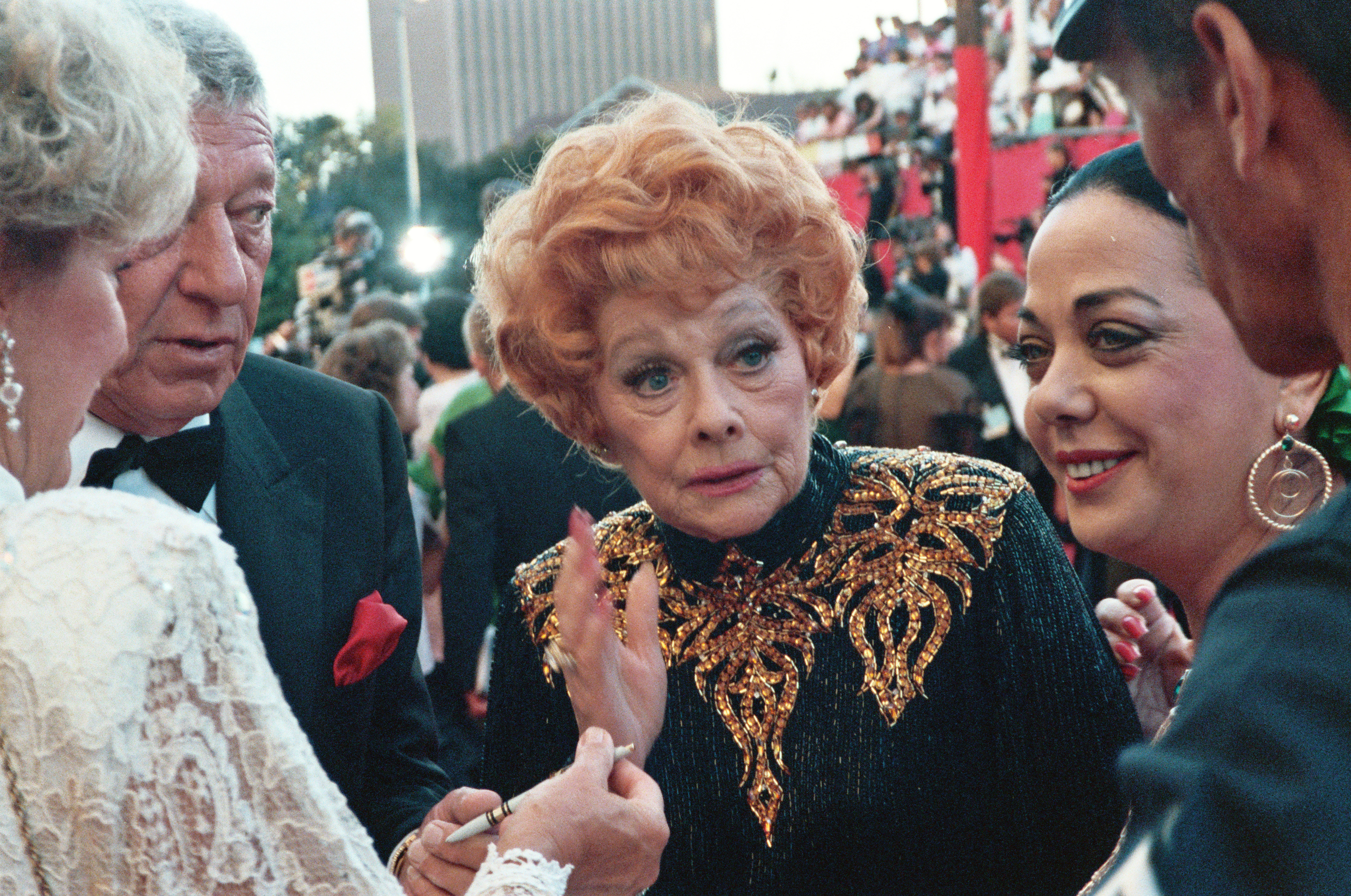
Ball in her last public appearance, at the 61st Academy Awards in 1989, four weeks before her death. Her husband, Gary Morton, is at left.

During the 1980s, Ball attempted to resurrect her television career. In 1982, she hosted a two-part Three's Company retrospective, showing clips from the show's first five seasons, summarizing memorable plotlines, and commenting on her love of the show.

In 1983, Lucille Ball and Gary Morton partnered to set up a film and television production house at 20th Century Fox that encompassed film and television productions as well as plans to produce plays.

Ball starred in a 1985 dramatic made-for-TV film about an elderly homeless woman, Stone Pillow, which received mixed reviews, but had strong viewership. Her 1986 sitcom comeback Life with Lucy, costarring her longtime foil Gale Gordon and co-produced by Ball, Gary Morton, and prolific producer Aaron Spelling, was canceled less than two months into its run by ABC. Ball was devastated by the failure of the show, and she never again attempted another series or feature film; her subsequent interviews and other TV appearances became infrequent. In February 1988, Ball was named the Hasty Pudding Woman of the Year.

In May 1988, Ball was hospitalized after suffering a mild heart attack. Her last public appearance, just one month before her death, was at the 1989 Academy Awards telecast, in which she and fellow presenter Bob Hope received a standing ovation.

== Personal life ==
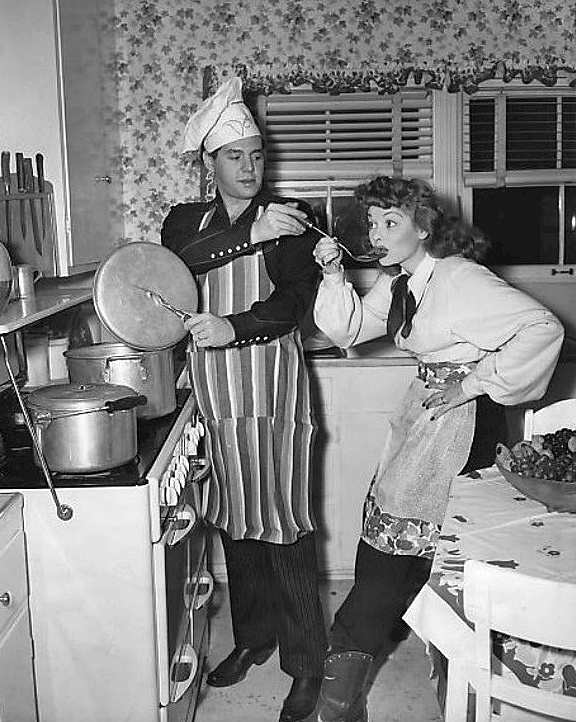
Desi Arnaz played Lucille Ball's husband in I Love Lucy

In 1940, Ball met Cuban-born bandleader Desi Arnaz while filming Too Many Girls. After months of dating, they eloped at the Byram River Beagle Club in Greenwich, Connecticut, on November 30, 1940. On the evening of their wedding, Arnaz was scheduled to perform two shows at the Roxy Theater in Manhattan. He missed the first show but made it back in time for the second.

In 1941, the couple purchased a five-acre ranch they called Desilu in Chatsworth, California, a suburban neighborhood in the San Fernando Valley. During the production of Valley of the Sun, Ball discovered she was pregnant but she suffered a miscarriage several weeks later in 1942.

Although Arnaz was drafted into the Army in 1943, he was classified for limited service due to a knee injury. He stayed in Los Angeles, and wound up as an instructor at an illiterate camp where he entertained the troops.

In 1944, Ball filed for divorce due to Arnaz's infidelity and drinking problems. She obtained an interlocutory decree; however, they reconciled, precluding the entry of a final decree.

Ball suffered a few more miscarriages before she gave birth to daughter Lucie Désirée Arnaz, a few weeks prior to her 40th birthday, on July 17, 1951. A year and a half later, she gave birth to Desiderio Alberto Arnaz IV, known as Desi Arnaz, Jr. Before he was born, I Love Lucy was a solid ratings hit, and Ball and Arnaz wrote the pregnancy into the show. Ball's necessary and planned caesarean section in real life was scheduled for the same date that her television character gave birth.

CBS insisted that a pregnant woman could not be shown on television, nor could the word "pregnant" be spoken on-air. After approval from several religious figures, the network allowed the pregnancy storyline, but insisted that the word "expecting" be used instead of "pregnant" (Arnaz garnered laughs when he deliberately mispronounced it as "spectin'"). The episode's official title is "Lucy Is Enceinte", borrowing the French word for pregnant; however, episode titles never appeared on-screen.

The episode aired on the evening of January 19, 1953, with 44 million viewers watching Lucy Ricardo welcome little Ricky, while in real life Ball delivered her second child, Desi Jr., that same day in Los Angeles. The birth made the cover of the first issue of TV Guide for the week of April 3–9, 1953.

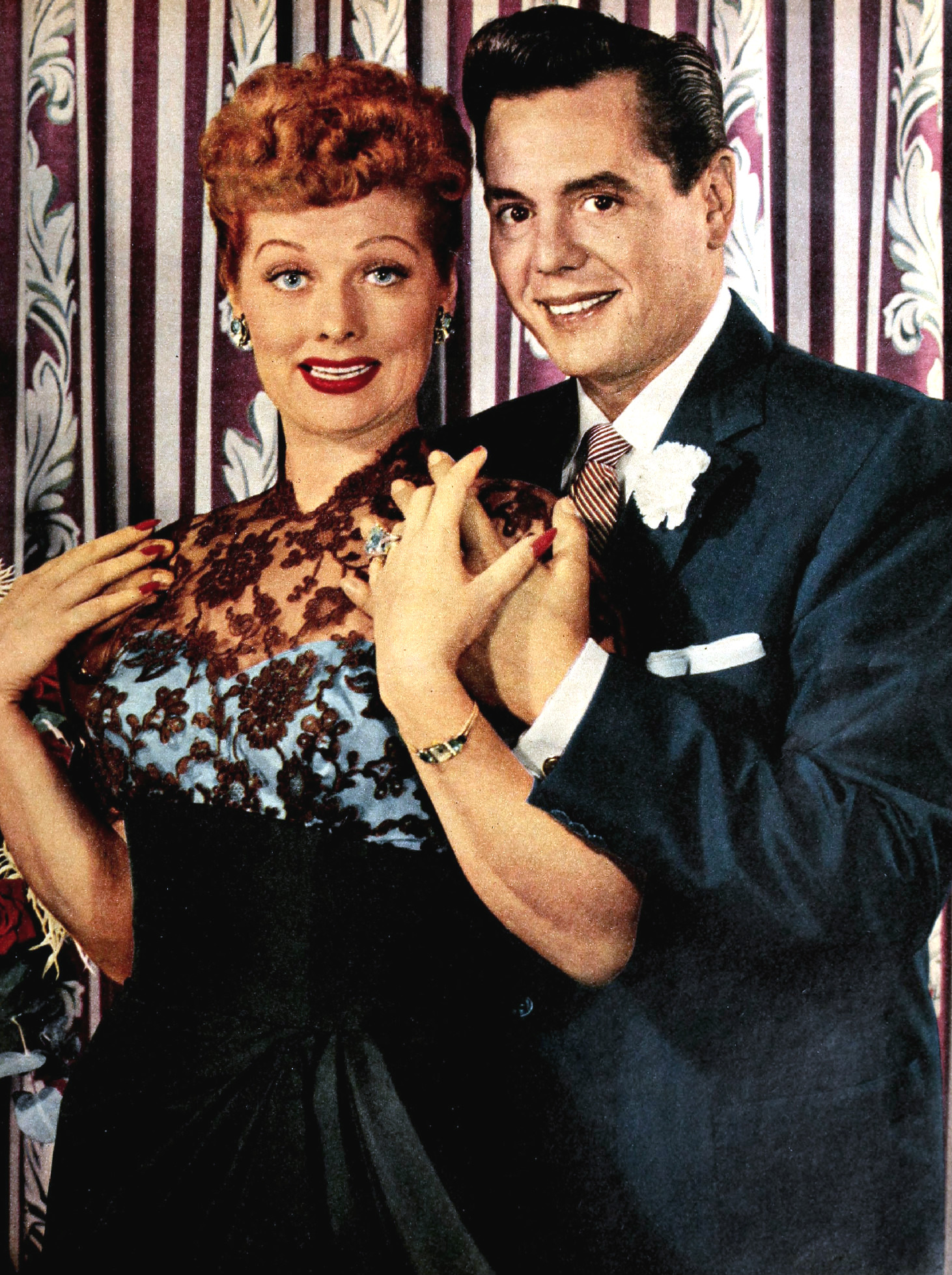
Ball with Desi Arnaz in the 1950s

In October 1956, Ball, Arnaz, Vance, and William Frawley all appeared on a Bob Hope special on NBC, including a spoof of I Love Lucy, the only time all four stars were together on a color telecast. By the end of the 1950s, Desilu had become a large company, causing a good deal of stress for both Ball and Arnaz.

On March 3, 1960, a day after Desi's 43rd birthday (and one day after filming the final episode of The Lucy-Desi Comedy Hour), Ball filed papers in Santa Monica Superior Court, claiming married life with Desi was "a nightmare" and nothing at all as it appeared on I Love Lucy. On May 4, 1960, they divorced; however, until his death in 1986, Arnaz and Ball remained friends and often spoke fondly of each other. Her real-life divorce indirectly found its way into her later television series, as she was always cast as an unmarried woman, each time a widow.

The following year, Ball starred in the Broadway musical Wildcat, co-starring Keith Andes and Paula Stewart. It marked the beginning of a 30-year friendship with Stewart, who introduced Ball to second husband Gary Morton, a Borscht Belt comic 13 years her junior. Morton and Ball married on November 19, 1961. According to Ball, Morton said he had never seen an episode of I Love Lucy due to his hectic work schedule. She immediately installed Morton in her production company, teaching him the television business and eventually promoting him to producer; he also played occasional bit parts on her various series. They had homes in Beverly Hills and Palm Springs, California, and in Snowmass Village, Colorado.

Letters regarding her marriage to Morton were published: "Boy, did I pick a winner!" Ball wrote to a friend in 1983 after she married Morton in 1961. "After 19 years with that Latin lover I never expected to marry again, but I'm glad I did!"

Ball was outspoken against the relationship her son had with actress Patty Duke. Later, commenting on when her son dated Liza Minnelli, she said: "I miss Liza, but you cannot domesticate Liza."

=== Communist affiliation ===
When Ball registered to vote in 1936, she listed her party affiliation as Communist, as did her brother and mother.

To sponsor the Communist Party's 1936 candidate for the California State Assembly's 57th District, Ball signed a certificate stating, "I am registered as affiliated with the Communist Party." The same year, the Communist Party of California appointed her to the state's Central Committee, according to records of the Secretary of State of California. In 1937, Hollywood writer Rena Vale, a self-identified Communist, attended a class at an address identified to her as Ball's home according to her testimony given before the United States House of Representatives' Special House Un-American Activities Committee (HUAC), on July 22, 1940. Two years later, Vale affirmed this testimony in a sworn deposition:

... within a few days after my third application to join the Communist Party was made, I received a notice to attend a meeting on North Ogden Drive, Hollywood; although it was a typed, unsigned note, merely requesting my presence at the address at 8 o'clock in the evening on a given day, I knew it was the long-awaited notice to attend Communist Party new members' classes ... on arrival at this address I found several others present; an elderly man informed us that we were the guests of the screen actress, Lucille Ball, and showed us various pictures, books, and other objects to establish that fact, and stated she was glad to loan her home for a Communist Party new members' class; ...

In a 1944 Pathé News newsreel titled "Fund Raising for Roosevelt", Ball was featured prominently among several stage and film stars at events in support of President Franklin D. Roosevelt's fundraising campaign for the March of Dimes. She stated that in the 1952 United States presidential election, she voted for Republican Dwight D. Eisenhower.

On September 4, 1953, Ball met voluntarily with HUAC investigator William A. Wheeler in Hollywood and gave him sealed testimony. She stated that she had registered to vote as a Communist "or intended to vote the Communist Party ticket" in 1936 at her socialist grandfather's insistence. She stated she "at no time intended to vote as a Communist". Her testimony was forwarded to J. Edgar Hoover in an FBI memorandum:

Ball stated she has never been a member of the Communist Party "to her knowledge" ... [She] did not know whether or not any meetings were ever held at her home at 1344 North Ogden Drive; stated ... [that if she had been appointed] as a delegate to the State Central Committee of the Communist Party of California in 1936 it was done without her knowledge or consent; [and stated that she] did not recall signing the document sponsoring EMIL FREED for the Communist Party nomination to the office of member of the assembly for the 57th District ... A review of the subject's file reflects no activity that would warrant her inclusion on the Security Index.

Immediately before the filming of episode 68 ("The Girls Go Into Business") of I Love Lucy, Desi Arnaz, instead of his usual audience warm-up, told the audience about Lucy and her grandfather. Reusing the line he had first given to Hedda Hopper in an interview, he quipped:

The only thing red about Lucy is her hair, and even that is not legitimate.

== Illness and death ==
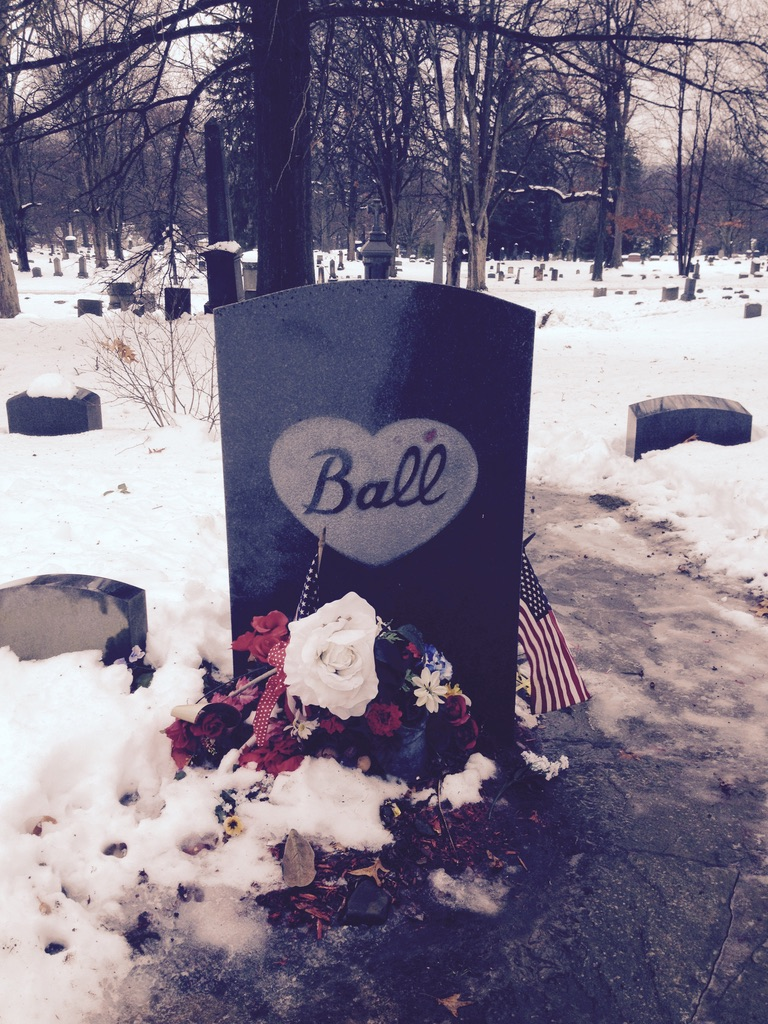
Lucille Ball's grave in Lake View Cemetery

On April 18, 1989, Ball was admitted to Cedars-Sinai Medical Center in Los Angeles after experiencing chest pains. She was diagnosed with a dissecting aortic aneurysm near her heart and underwent a 7-hour surgery to repair her aorta and successfully install an aortic valve replacement.

On Wednesday, April 26, while still in the hospital, Ball awoke with severe back pain, then lost consciousness and died at 5:47 a.m. PDT. Doctors determined that she had succumbed to a ruptured abdominal aortic aneurysm. They also learned the area of the aorta operated on the week prior had no bearing on the abdominal tear.

Three memorial services were held for Ball. She was cremated, and the ashes were originally interred at Forest Lawn – Hollywood Hills Cemetery in Los Angeles, where her mother was also buried. In 2002, Ball's and her mother's remains were re-interred at the Hunt family plot at Lake View Cemetery in Jamestown, New York, in accordance with Ball's wishes to be buried near her mother.

== Recognition and legacy ==
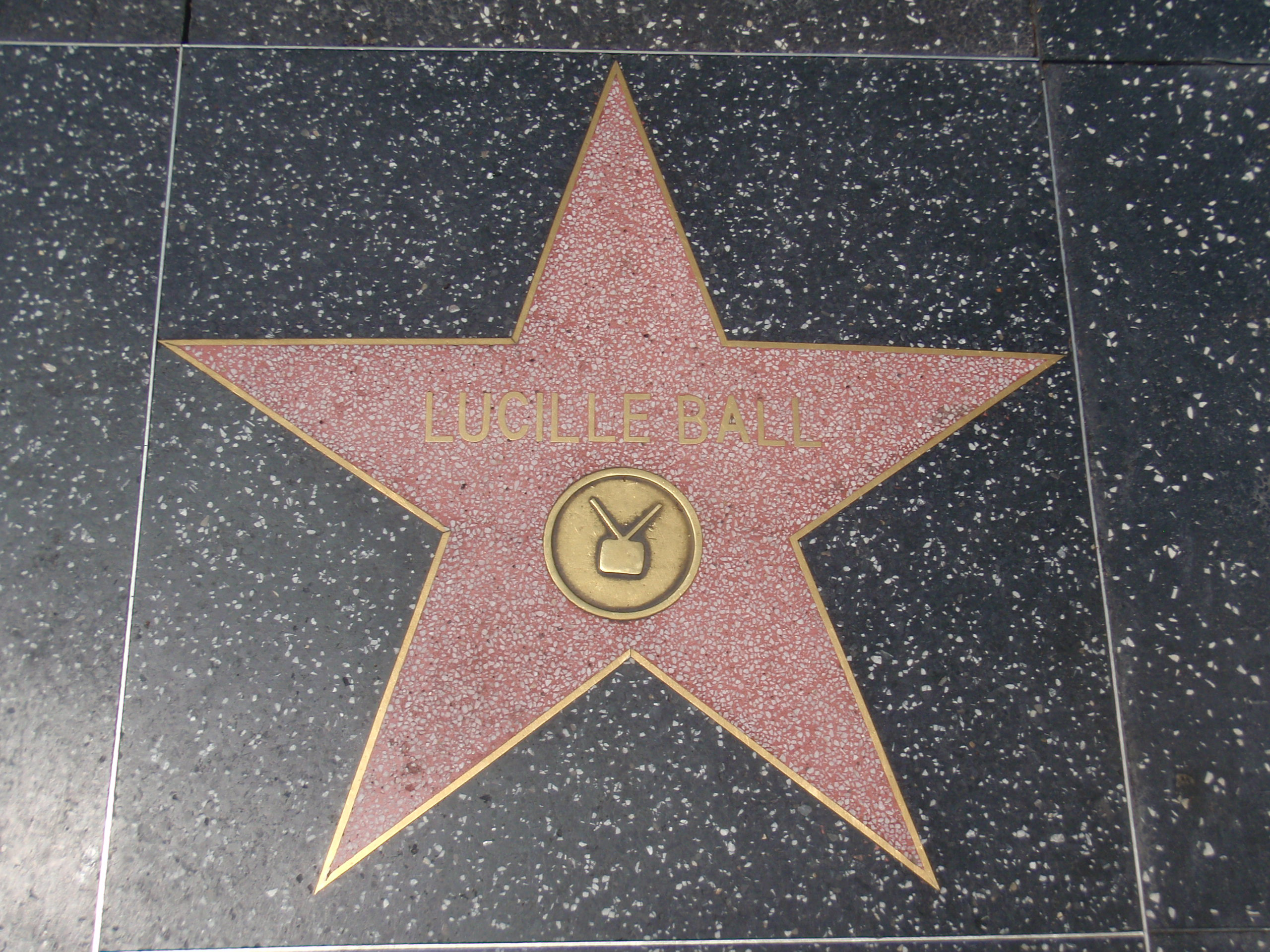
Ball's Hollywood Walk of Fame star for her television work

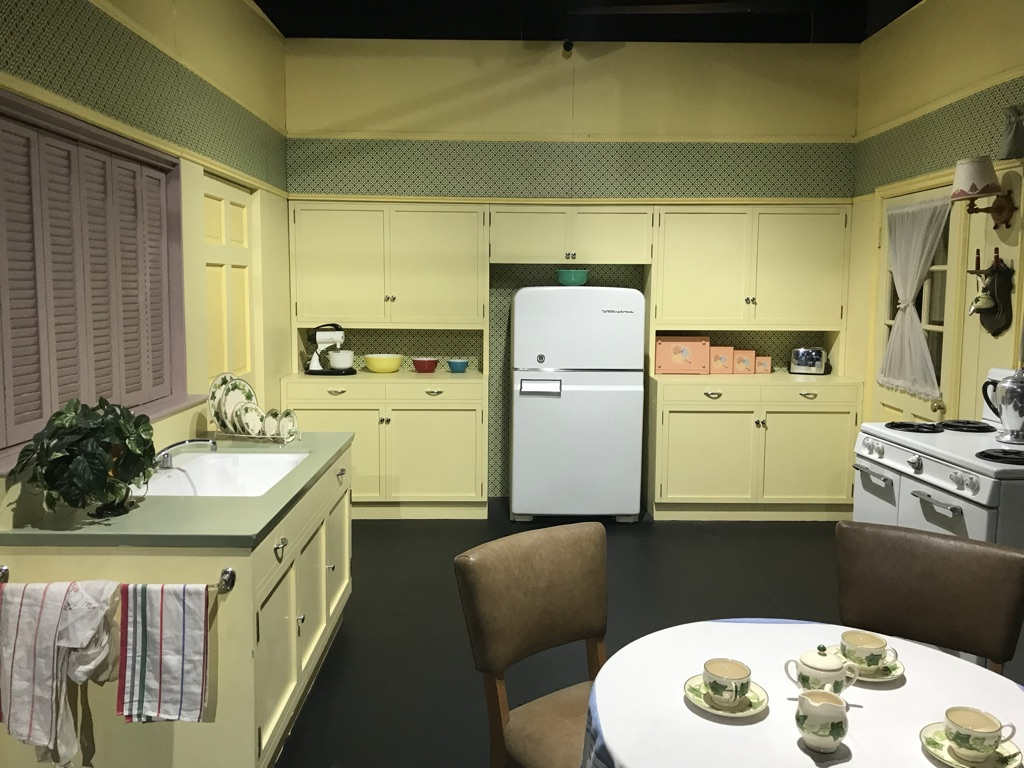
Lucille Ball Museum I Love Lucy set

Ball received many tributes, honors, and awards throughout her career and posthumously. On February 8, 1960, she was given two stars on the Hollywood Walk of Fame: at 6436 Hollywood Boulevard, for contributions to motion pictures; and at 6100 Hollywood Boulevard, for her contribution to the arts and sciences of television. In 1964, Ball and her second husband, Morton, attended "Lucy Day", a celebration in her honor held by the New York World's Fair.

Acting on advice given to her by Norman Vincent Peale in the early 1960s, Ball collaborated with Betty Hannah Hoffman on an autobiography that covered her life until 1964. Her former attorney found the manuscript, postmarked 1966, while going through old files. He sent it and the tapes of interviews, conducted by Hoffman and used to write the manuscript, to Lucie and Desi Jr., who had been put in charge of their mother's estate. It was subsequently published by Berkley Publishing Group in 1997. The book was released on audio through Audible on July 9, 2018, read by her daughter.

In 1976, CBS paid tribute to Ball with the two-hour special CBS Salutes Lucy: The First 25 Years. Both Ball and Arnaz appeared on the screen for the special, which is the first time they appeared together in 16 years since their divorce.

On December 7, 1986, Ball was recognized as a Kennedy Center Honors recipient. The part of the event focused on Ball was particularly poignant, as Desi Arnaz, who was to introduce Lucy at the event, had died from cancer just five days earlier. Friend and former Desilu star Robert Stack delivered the emotional introduction in Arnaz's place.

Posthumously, Ball received the Presidential Medal of Freedom from President George H. W. Bush on July 6, 1989, and The Women's International Center's Living Legacy Award.

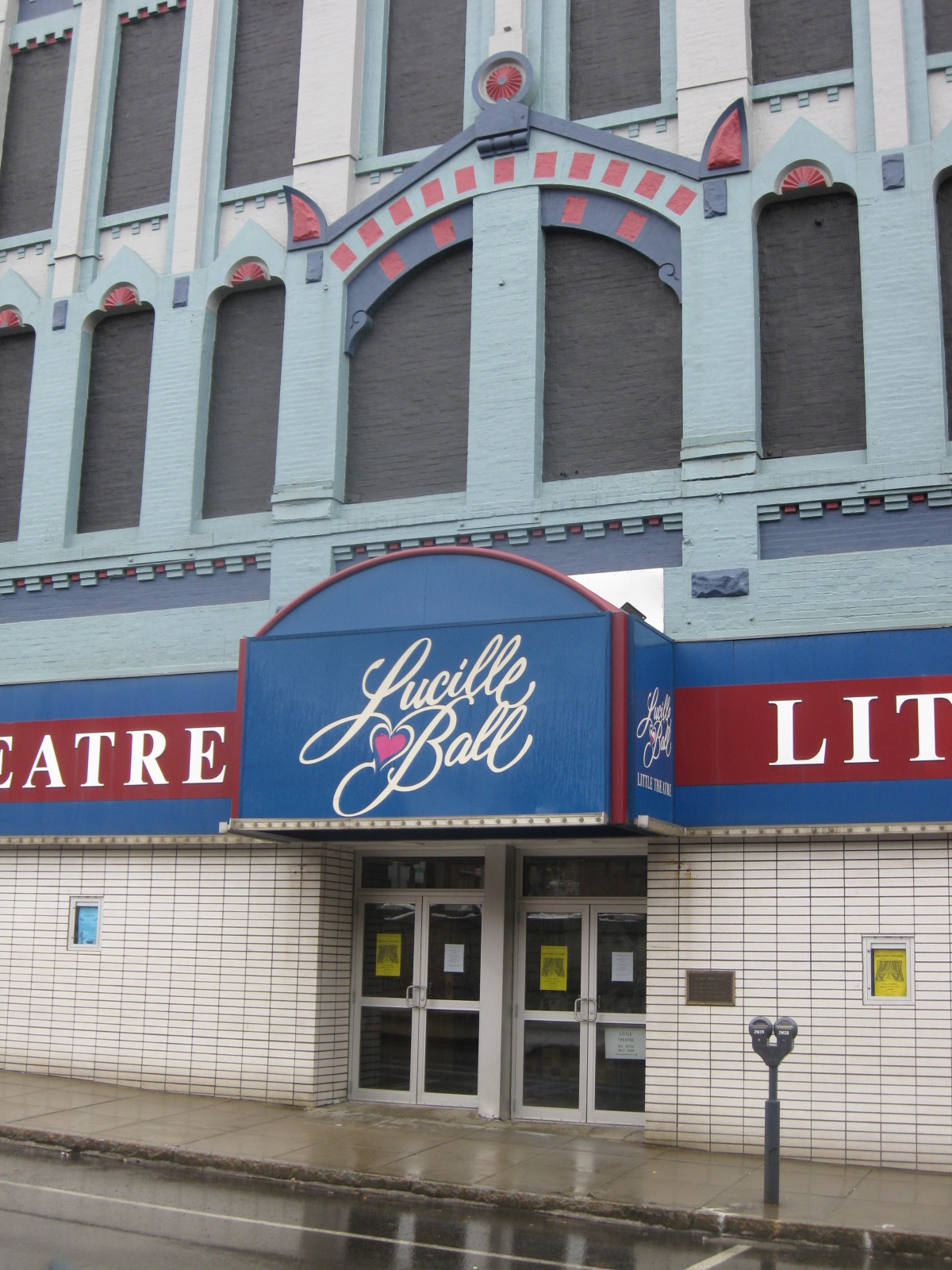
The Lucille Ball Little Theatre in Ball's hometown of Jamestown, New York

The Lucille Ball Desi Arnaz Museum & Center for Comedy is in Ball's hometown of Jamestown, New York. The Little Theatre was renamed the Lucille Ball Little Theatre in her honor. The street she was born on was renamed Lucy Lane.

Ball was among Time magazine's "100 Most Important People of the Century".

On June 7, 1990, Universal Studios Florida opened a walk-through attraction dedicated to Ball, Lucy – A Tribute. It featured clips of shows, facts about her life, displays of items she owned or that were associated with her, and an interactive quiz. It remained open until August 17, 2015.

On August 6, 2001, the United States Postal Service honored what would have been Ball's 90th birthday with a commemorative stamp as part of its Legends of Hollywood series.

Ball appeared on 39 covers of TV Guide, more than any other person, including its first cover in 1953 with her baby son, Desi Arnaz Jr. TV Guide voted her the "Greatest TV Star of All Time", and later commemorated the 50th anniversary of I Love Lucy with eight covers celebrating memorable scenes from the show. In 2008, it named I Love Lucy the second-best television program in American history, after Seinfeld.

For her contributions to the Women's Movement, Ball was inducted into the National Women's Hall of Fame in 2001.

The Friars Club named a room in its New York clubhouse the Lucille Ball Room. She was posthumously awarded the Legacy of Laughter Award at the fifth Annual TV Land Awards in 2007. In November 2007, she was chosen as number two on a list of the 50 Greatest TV Icons, behind Johnny Carson; however, a public poll chose her as number one.

On August 6, 2011, Google's homepage showed an interactive doodle of six classic moments from I Love Lucy to commemorate what would have been Ball's 100th birthday. On the same day, 915 Ball look-alikes converged on Jamestown to celebrate the birthday and set a new world record for such a gathering.

In 2019, Time created 89 new covers to celebrate women of the year starting from 1920; it chose Ball for 1951.

Since 2009, a statue of Ball has been on display in Celoron, New York, that residents deemed "scary" and not accurate, earning it the nickname "Scary Lucy". On August 1, 2016, it was announced that a new statue of Ball would replace it on August 6. However, the old statue had become a local tourist attraction after receiving media attention, and it was placed 75 yards (69 m) from its original location so visitors could view both statues.

Ball was a well-known gay-rights supporter, stating in a 1980 interview with People: "It's perfectly all right with me. Some of the most gifted people I've ever met or read about are homosexual. How can you knock it?"

=== Depictions and homages ===
Ball has been portrayed or referenced numerous times in other media. In 1991, CBS aired Lucy & Desi: Before the Laughter, starring Frances Fisher. Rachel York and Madeline Zima portrayed Ball in a biographical television film titled Lucy which was directed by Glenn Jordan and originally broadcast on CBS on May 4, 2003.

In 2015, it was announced that Ball would be played by Cate Blanchett in an untitled biographical film, to be written and directed by Aaron Sorkin. Subsequently, Nicole Kidman was hired to portray Ball when Sorkin's film entitled Being the Ricardos was produced in 2021. On February 8, 2022, Kidman received a nomination for the Academy Award for Best Actress for her portrayal of Ball. Kidman also won the Golden Globe Award for Best Actress in a Motion Picture – Drama for her performance.

A 2017 episode of Will & Grace paid homage to Ball by replicating the 1963 shower scene from the episode "Lucy and Viv Put in a Shower" from The Lucy Show. Three years later, an entire episode was dedicated to her by recreating four scenes from I Love Lucy. Separately in 2017, Ball's character Lucy Ricardo was portrayed by Gillian Anderson in the American Gods episode "The Secret of Spoons" (2017).

Ball was portrayed by Sarah Drew in the play I Love Lucy: A Funny Thing Happened on the Way to the Sitcom, a comedy about how Ball and her husband battled to get their sitcom on the air. It premiered in Los Angeles on July 12, 2018, co-starring Oscar Nuñez as Desi Arnaz, and Seamus Dever as I Love Lucy producer-head writer Jess Oppenheimer. The play was written by Oppenheimer's son, Gregg Oppenheimer.

BBC Radio 4 broadcast a 'Jarvis & Ayres' production of a serialized version of the play in the UK in August 2020, as Lucy loves Desi: A Funny Thing happened on the way to the Sitcom starring Anne Heche as Ball and Wilmer Valderrama as Arnaz, with Jared Harris, Stacy Keach, Mike McShane, and Alfred Molina, co-starring. In January 2023, L.A. Theatre Works mounted a 22-city U.S. national tour of the play (as Lucy loves Desi: A Funny Thing Happened on the Way to the Sitcom), starring Ellis Greer as Ball.

A Barbie doll based on Ball, designed by Bill Greening, was released in 2021.

== Works ==
- Hoffman, Betty Hannah, ed. (1996). Love, Lucy. New York: Putnam. ISBN 978-0-399-14205-5. OCLC 34788720. This autobiography covers Ball's life up to 1964. It was discovered by her children in 1989 ("Love, Lucy". WorldCat.) Hardcover
  - Hoffman, Betty Hannah, ed. (1997). Love, Lucy. New York: Berkley Books. ISBN 978-0-425-17731-0. OCLC 52255505. Paperback

== Accolades ==
Ball's awards and nominations references:

Association	Year	Category	Nominated work	Result
American Comedy Awards	1987	Lifetime Achievement Award in Comedy		Won
Golden Apple Awards	1963	Most Cooperative Actress		Nominated
Golden Apple Awards	1973	Female Star of the Year		Won
Golden Globes	1961	Best Actress — Motion Picture Comedy or Musical	The Facts of Life	Nominated
Golden Globes	1968	Best Actress – Television Series Musical or Comedy	The Lucy Show	Nominated
Golden Globes	1969	Best Actress — Motion Picture Comedy or Musical	Yours, Mine and Ours	Nominated
Golden Globes	1970	Best Actress – Television Series Musical or Comedy	Here's Lucy	Nominated
Golden Globes	1972	Best Actress – Television Series Musical or Comedy	Here's Lucy	Nominated
Golden Globes	1975	Best Actress — Motion Picture Comedy or Musical	Mame	Nominated
Golden Globes	1979	Cecil B. DeMille Award		Won
Hasty Pudding Theatricals	1988	Woman of the Year		Won
International Radio and Television Society	1971	International Radio and Television Society – Gold Medal		Won
Kennedy Center Honors	1986	Kennedy Center Honors		Won
Laurel Awards	1961	Top Female Comedy Performance	The Facts of Life	Nominated
Laurel Awards	1968	Female Comedy Performance	Yours, Mine and Ours	Won
Online Film & Television Association (OFTA) TV Awards	1997	Television Hall of Fame — Actors and Actresses		Won
Palm Springs International Film Festival	1990	Desert Palm Achievement Award		Won
Primetime Emmy Awards	1952	Lead Actress in a Comedy Series	I Love Lucy	Nominated
Primetime Emmy Awards	1953	Lead Actress in a Comedy Series	I Love Lucy	Won
Primetime Emmy Awards	1953	Lead Actress in a Comedy Series	I Love Lucy	Nominated
Primetime Emmy Awards	1954	Lead Actress in a Comedy Series	I Love Lucy	Nominated
Primetime Emmy Awards	1955	Lead Actress in a Comedy Series	I Love Lucy	Nominated
Primetime Emmy Awards	1956	Lead Actress in a Comedy Series	I Love Lucy	Nominated
Primetime Emmy Awards	1956	Lead Actress in a Comedy Series	I Love Lucy	Won
Primetime Emmy Awards	1957	Lead Actress in a Comedy Series	I Love Lucy	Nominated
Primetime Emmy Awards	1958	Lead Actress in a Comedy Series	I Love Lucy	Nominated
Primetime Emmy Awards	1963	Lead Actress in a Comedy Series	The Lucy Show	Nominated
Primetime Emmy Awards	1966	Lead Actress in a Comedy Series	The Lucy Show	Nominated
Primetime Emmy Awards	1967	Lead Actress in a Comedy Series	The Lucy Show	Won
Primetime Emmy Awards	1968	Lead Actress in a Comedy Series	The Lucy Show	Won
Primetime Emmy Awards	1989	Governor's Award		Won
TCA Awards	1989	Career Achievement Award		Won
TV Land Awards	2007	Legacy of Laughter Award		Won
Walk of Fame	1960	Television — 6100 Hollywood, Blvd.		Won
Walk of Fame	1960	Motion Picture — 6436 Hollywood, Blvd.		Won
Women in Film Crystal + Lucy Awards	1977	Crystal Award		Won
