= Three Little Pigskins =

1934 short film by Ray McCarey

- The Stooges were not professionally known as "The Three Stooges" when the film was released as they were billed by their individual names
- Directed by: Raymond McCarey
- Written by: Felix Adler and Griffin Jay
- Produced by: Jules White (uncredited)
- Starring: Moe Howard; Larry Fine; Jerry Howard; Lucille Ball
- Cinematography: Henry Freulich, A.S.C.
- Edited by: James Sweeney
- Distributed by: Columbia Pictures
- Release date: December 8, 1934 (U.S.)
- Running time: 18:25
- Country: United States
- Language: English

Three Little Pigskins is a 1934 short subject directed by Raymond McCarey and starring American slapstick comedy team The Three Stooges (Moe Howard, Larry Fine, and Jerry Howard). It is the fourth entry in the series released by Columbia Pictures starring the comedians, who released 190 short films for the studio between 1934 and 1959.

== Plot ==
The Stooges are hired by a college to promote the college football team by masquerading as football players. Meanwhile, the owner of a professional football team, Joe Stacks, is in need of three new players for the next game. Joe's girlfriend meets the Stooges and confuses them for the famed "The Three Horsemen" (a parody of the "Four Horsemen" of Notre Dame fame). The Stooges go back to her house and meet the girl's two friends.

After a chaotic sequence in which everybody is doused using seltzer bottles, they decide to play the game Blind man's buff. As the blindfolded Stooges pursue the girls, Joe and his two henchmen walk in. They physically assault the Stooges until one of the women explains that the three strangers are "The Three Famous Horsemen". Joe offers them money to play for him.

Pressed into service for Joe's team, the Stooges' ineptitude on the football field results in a calamitous debut. Convinced that the Stooges's poor play is deliberate sabotage, Joe and his associates resort to violent retribution, wielding firearms in pursuit of the hapless trio.

== Cast ==
=== Credited ===
- Moe Howard as Moe
- Larry Fine as Larry
- Curley Howard as Curley
- Lucille Ball as Daisy Simms
- Gertie Green as Lulu Banks
- Phyllis Crane as Molly Gray

=== Uncredited ===
- Walter Long as Joe Stacks
- Joseph Young as Pete
- Milton Douglas as Henchman
- Lynton Brent as first man panhandled by Moe
- Jimmy Phillips as second man panhandled by Moe
- Larry Wheat as third man panhandled by Moe
- Bobby Burns as man panhandled by Larry
- Johnny Kascier as man panhandled by Curly
- Harry Bowen as Boulder Dam publicity man
- Dutch Hendrian as Referee
- William J. Irving as first Photographer
- Charles Dorety as second Photographer

== Production ==
Three Little Pigskins was filmed on October 25–30, 1934. The title is a multiple pun, derived from The Three Little Pigs, and pigskin is a synonym for football. It is one of the earliest credited appearances for a then platinum blonde-haired Lucille Ball, who played a supporting role as one of the female recruiters and became famous years later for her own physical comedy. When reminiscing on this short, Ball (apparently referring to the seltzer squirting scene) remarked, "The only thing I learned from The Three Stooges was how to duck. I still got wet!"

The game is set at Gilmore Stadium. One shot includes a billboard for Gilmore Oil with its trademark lion symbol. Despite a football game being played, real-life baseball teams are listed on the scoreboard, the Detroit Tigers and the Chicago Cubs. The football team the Stooges played against was that of Loyola Marymount University.

A planned concluding scene had the Stooges, years later, telling the story to their sons. It is unknown if this scene was ever filmed, but publicity photos show the Stooges, each paired with a young son made to resemble his father.

=== Injuries ===
Moe Howard once called Three Little Pigskins "a humdinger of bangs and bruises", as it is the first time the Stooges flatly refused to perform a stunt. In the film, during the game the boys are stopped by photographers on the sideline to pose for a picture, when the football players then tackle them. The team consisted of genuine college football players, and the Stooges—with their small stature—were afraid of being hurt. Larry Fine, the slightest of the three, told director Raymond McCarey, "Look, we can't do this scene. We're not stuntmen and if one of those gorillas falls on us, we'll never be able to finish the picture. We've never used stunt doubles before but we certainly need them now." The fact that both Curly and Larry had been hurt a few days earlier filming this project, when Curly broke his leg riding down the dumbwaiter and Larry lost a tooth due to a mistimed punch, reinforced the trio's decision to opt out of the scene.

McCarey assured the Stooges that it was safe, saying "Listen, fellows, you know how to take falls. You've done enough of them. It'll take hours to find doubles for you. Besides, we can't afford them. Don't worry, you won't get hurt." Moe Howard dryly agreed with McCarey, saying, "You're darn right we won't get hurt. We're not doing the scene."

Less than an hour after the exchange, the studio found three stunt doubles made up to look like the Stooges. McCarey yelled "Action" and chaos ensued. Two of the doubles and both photographers were seriously injured with broken limbs. The only unhurt stuntman was Curly's, because of the padding that he wore to resemble the rotund Stooge. Moe Howard later said in his autobiography that "McCarey was speechless and sat in his director's chair with his head in his hands."

== See also ==
- List of American football films
