= Runyon =

Runyon is a surname based upon the French surname Rongnion, brought to North America by Vincent Rongnion. It can be also spelled Runyons, Runyan, Runyun, Runion, Rongnion, Runnion, and others. It may refer to:

== People ==
The following people have the family name Runyon:

- Brenda Vineyard Runyon, founder of the first U.S. bank managed and directed entirely by women
- Brent Runyon, writer born in 1977 who is best known for The Burn Journals
- Carter Runyon (born 2001), American football player
- Damon Runyon (born Alfred Damon Runyan), hall-of-fame sports writer and short story writer
- Jennifer Runyon (1960–2026), American TV actress
- Marie M. Runyon (1915-2018), New York political activist, state assembly member 1975–1976
- Marvin Travis Runyon, 20th-century American automotive executive and U.S. Postmaster 1992-1998
- Theodore Runyon, American Civil War general, diplomat, and mayor of Newark, New Jersey
- William Nelson Runyon, early 20th-century American politician from New Jersey

== Places ==
- Damon Runyon Cancer Research Foundation of New York City
- Fort Runyon, a U.S. Civil War fort built to defend Washington, D.C.
- Runyon Canyon Park in Los Angeles
- Runyon, Florida, an unincorporated community in the United States
- Runyon, New Jersey, an unincorporated community in the United States
- Runyon Heights, Yonkers, New York
- Runyon Lake

== Other ==
- Damon Runyon Stakes, a Thoroughbred turf race held annually in New York City
- Runyon classification, a system of classifying certain bacteria
- Runyon v. McCrary, a 1976 U.S. Supreme Court case

== See also ==
- Runyan (disambiguation)
