= Leo Lomski =

American boxer (c.1902–1975)

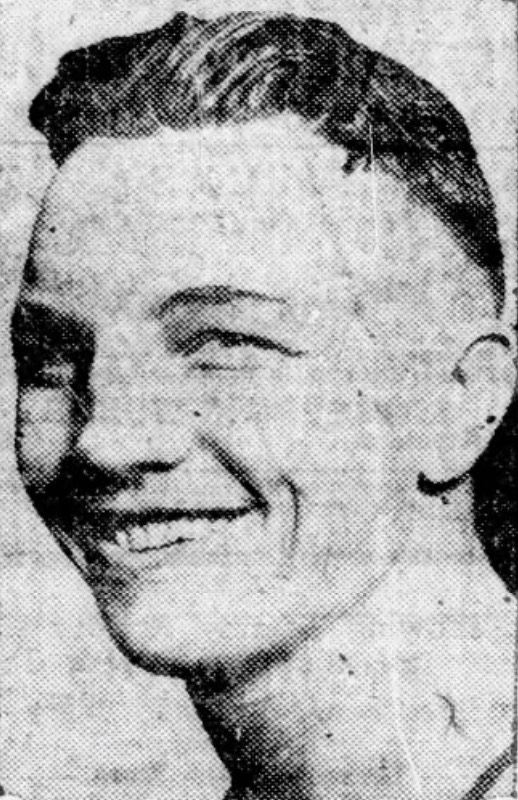
- Lomski in 1929

Personal information
- Born: Leo Joseph Lomski c. 1902 Davenport, Oklahoma, US
- Died: November 12, 1975 (aged 72) Grayland, Washington, US
- Weight: Welterweight; Middleweight; Light heavyweight

Boxing career

Boxing record
- Total fights: 275
- Wins: 257
- Win by KO: 85+
- Losses: 18

Leo Joseph Lomski (c. 1902 – November 12, 1975) was an American boxer. Nicknamed the "Aberdeen Assassin", he achieved a record of 257–18 over the course of his career, spanning from 1918 to 1933. A light heavyweight, he was in contention for the 1928 world championship, though lost to Tommy Loughran.

== Biography ==
=== 1900s–1924: early life and early career ===
Lomski was born c. 1902, in Davenport, Oklahoma. He had a sister. In 1918, at age 15, he lied about his age to join the United States Navy. He began his boxing career while in the Navy, participating in 75 matches, winning all of them by knockout. After being discharged, he moved to Mullan, Idaho, where he worked as a miner and fought in 50 matches, winning all by knockout.

=== 1924–1933: professional career ===
In 1924, Lomski moved to Aberdeen, Washington. He fought at the Lotus Arena, whose operator, Eddie Eicher, became his only manager. A regular attendee of the arena, Sam Barber, nicknamed him the "Aberdeen Assassin". He gained his strength by working as a lumberjack.

Lomski never had an amateur career. Early in his career, he was a welterweight, later growing to middleweight and light heavyweight. Damon Runyon described him as "stocky built". His boxing style was described as "aggressive", characterized by powerful punches aimed at the torso.

Lomski was trained by Ray Arcel and Bernie Dillon. He was briefly a third baseman for the Aberdeen Black Cats. On June 14, 1927, he participated in his first match on the East Coast of the United States. He fought Harold Mays, who previously sparred with Gene Tunney.

On June 21, 1927, Lomski fought Maxie Rosenbloom in a 12-round match. Fought at the Queensboro Stadium, the match was attended by 4,000 and was judged by C. W. Dingee and Charles F. Mathison. Lomski, who had been the instigator in the match's buildup and promotion, won.

Seventeen of Lomski's matches were fought in Madison Square Garden, including the 1928 light-heavyweight boxing world championship – viewed by 15,000, which he lost to Tommy Loughran due to one second of time downed. Lomski downed him twice in the first round, reaching the count of nine seconds, but Loughran regained himself and came back to win the championship.

Lomski defeated James J. Braddock twice. They fought a 10-round match on January 18, 1929, with Lomski having been the favored 7-to-5 as a result of his experience. On August 19, 1929, he fought Mickey Walker in a 10-round match. Walker won overall, winning six rounds, while Lomski won three and tied one. Fought at Philadelphia Municipal Stadium, 25,000 people were in attendance.

While fighting on the West Coast of the United States, Lomski bested boxers such as Tiger Flowers, Jock Malone, Eddie Roberts, and Quintin Romero Rojas, among others. He also bested boxers such as Bert Colima, Pete Latzo, and Mike McTigue. He lost to King Levinsky in Chicago, with his skull being fractured and receiving the only knockout against him. He challenged boxers such as Harry Greb, Ace Hudkins, and Max Schmeling to fights, all of who declined; he challenged Schmeling in his native language of German.

Over the course of his career, he participated in 275 matches, achieving a record of 257–18; he won at least 85 by knockout. In an interview, he stated he earned $275,000 from boxing.

=== Post-boxing life ===
From 1939 to 1964, Lomski was a member of the United States Merchant Marine. He served on a cargo ship during World War II, sailing in the Pacific War and being struck by a torpedo in the Mediterranean Sea. He was married to Mildred Lomski, and had three sons. He broke his right hand 31 times. He died on November 12, 1975, aged 72, in Grayland.
