= Runyan =

Runyan is a surname. Notable people with the surname include:

- Damon Runyon (born Alfred Damon Runyan; 1880–1946), American newspaperman and writer
- Damon Runyan (born 1976), actor
- Jon Runyan (born 1973), American politician
- Jon Runyan Jr. (born 1997), American football player & son of Jon
- Marla Runyan (born 1969), American athlete and runner
- Pablo Runyan (1925–2002), Panamanian painter
- Paul Runyan (1908–2002), American golfer
- Rachael Runyan (1979–1982), American murder victim
- Sean Runyan (born 1974), American baseball player
- Tygh Runyan (born 1976), American/Canadian actor and musician

== See also ==
- Runyon (disambiguation)
