= 19th-century National League teams =

The following is a list of United States Major League Baseball teams that played in the National League during the 19th century. None of these teams, other than Athletic and Mutual, had actual names during this period; sportswriters however often applied creative monickers which are still, mistakenly, used today as "team names" following a convention established in 1951.

== Surviving teams ==
=== Major league ===
- Boston: "Red Stockings, "Red Caps," "Beaneaters" 1876–1900 – now Atlanta Braves
- Brooklyn: "Grays," "Bridegrooms," "Grooms," "Superbas," "Robins," "Trolley Dodgers" 1890–1900 – transferred from the American Association; now Los Angeles Dodgers
- Chicago "White Stockings": 1876–1900 – now known as the Cubs
- Cincinnati: "Red Stockings" or "Reds" 1890–1900 – transferred from the American Association
- New York: occasionally "Gothams," more often "Giants" 1883–1900 – later the New York Giants and now San Francisco Giants
- Philadelphia 1883–1900 – very occasionally tagged "Quakers" 1883–1890, most often "Philadelphias" in the style of the day, shortened to "Phillies."
- Pittsburgh: 1887–1900 founded as Allegheny (a Pittsburgh suburb) and referred to in typical manner as "Alleghenys" 1883-1890, dubbed "Pirates" from 1891 – transferred from the American Association
- St. Louis "Brown Stockings or "Browns," later "Red Stockings" or "Reds" 1892–1900 – transferred from the American Association; now known as the Cardinals.

=== Minor league ===
- Buffalo Bisons 1879–1885 – moved to the minors in 1886 and played in Buffalo until 1970 before several moves. Suspended operations in 1973. A current minor league team bearing the "Buffalo Bisons" name, dating to 1979, claims this team as part of their official history.

== Defunct teams ==
- Baltimore Orioles 1892-1899 - transferred from the American Association
- Cincinnati Red Stockings 1876–1879
- Cleveland Blues 1879–1884
- Cincinnati Stars 1880
- Cleveland Spiders 1889–1899 – transferred from the American Association; the 1899 Cleveland Spiders hold the record for the worst winning percentage in the history of Major League Baseball
- Detroit Wolverines 1881–1888
- Hartford Dark Blues 1876–1877 – transferred from National Association; based in Brooklyn in 1877
- Indianapolis Blues 1878
- St. Louis Maroons/Black Diamonds/Indianapolis Hoosiers 1885–1889 – transferred from the Union Association in 1885; moved to Indianapolis where often called Hoosiers in 1887
- Kansas City Cowboys 1886
- Louisville Grays 1876–1877
- Louisville Colonels 1892–1899 – transferred from the American Association
- Milwaukee Grays (or Cream Citys) 1878
- Mutual of New York 1876 – transferred from National Association
- Athletic of Philadelphia 1876 – transferred from National Association
- Providence Grays 1878–1885
- St. Louis Brown Stockings 1876–1877 – transferred from National Association
- Syracuse Stars 1879
- Troy Trojans 1879–1882
- Washington Nationals (1886–1889)
- Washington Senators (1891–1899)
- Worcester Ruby Legs 1880–1882

== Franchises by Year ==
- 1876
  - Boston
  - Chicago
  - Cincinnati
  - Hartford
  - Louisville
  - Mutual
  - Athletic
  - St. Louis
- Between 1876 and 1877 seasons
  - Drop: Mutual and Athletic
- 1877
  - Boston
  - Chicago
  - Cincinnati
  - Hartford (played most games in Brooklyn)
  - Louisville
  - St. Louis
- Between 1877 and 1878 seasons
  - Drop: Hartford, Louisville and St. Louis
  - Add: Indianapolis, Milwaukee and Providence
- 1878
  - Boston
  - Chicago
  - Cincinnati
  - Indianapolis
  - Milwaukee
  - Providence
- Between 1878 and 1879 seasons
  - Drop: Indianapolis and Milwaukee
  - Add: Buffalo, Cleveland, Syracuse and Troy
- 1879
  - Boston
  - Chicago
  - Cincinnati
  - Providence
  - Buffalo
  - Cleveland
  - Syracuse
  - Troy
- Between 1879 and 1880 seasons
  - Drop: Syracuse
  - Add: Worcester
- 1880
  - Boston
  - Chicago
  - Cincinnati
  - Providence
  - Buffalo
  - Cleveland
  - Troy
  - Worcester
- Between 1880 and 1881 seasons
  - Drop: Cincinnati
  - Add: Detroit
- 1881
  - Boston
  - Chicago
  - Providence
  - Buffalo
  - Cleveland
  - Troy
  - Worcester
  - Detroit
- Between 1881 and 1882 seasons
  - Drop:none
  - Add: none
- 1882
  - Boston
  - Chicago
  - Providence
  - Buffalo
  - Cleveland
  - Troy
  - Worcester
  - Detroit
- Between 1882 and 1883 seasons
  - Drop: Troy and Worcester
  - Add: New York and Philadelphia
- 1883
  - Boston
  - Chicago
  - Providence
  - Buffalo
  - Cleveland
  - Detroit
  - New York
  - Philadelphia
- Between 1883 and 1884 seasons
  - Drop: none
  - Add: none
- 1884
  - Boston
  - Chicago
  - Providence
  - Buffalo
  - Cleveland
  - Detroit
  - New York
  - Philadelphia
- Between 1884 and 1885 seasons
  - Drop: Cleveland
  - Add: St. Louis from the Union Association
- 1885
  - Boston
  - Chicago
  - Providence
  - Buffalo
  - Detroit
  - New York
  - Philadelphia
  - St. Louis
- Between 1885 and 1886 seasons
  - Drop: Buffalo and Providence
  - Add: Kansas City and Washington
- 1886
  - Boston
  - Chicago
  - Detroit
  - New York
  - Philadelphia
  - St. Louis
  - Kansas City
  - Washington
- Between 1886 and 1887 seasons
  - Drop: Kansas City
  - Add: Pittsburgh (from the American Association)
  - Move: St. Louis to Indianapolis
- 1887
  - Boston
  - Chicago
  - Detroit
  - New York
  - Philadelphia
  - Washington
  - Indianapolis
  - Pittsburgh
- Between 1887 and 1888 seasons
  - Drop: none
- 1888
  - Boston
  - Chicago
  - Detroit
  - New York
  - Philadelphia
  - Washington
  - Indianapolis
  - Pittsburgh
- Between 1888 and 1889 seasons
  - Drop: Detroit
  - Add: Cleveland from the American Association
- 1889
  - Boston
  - Chicago
  - New York
  - Philadelphia
  - Washington
  - Indianapolis
  - Pittsburgh
  - Cleveland
- Between 1889 and 1890 seasons
  - Drop: Indianapolis and Washington
  - Add: Brooklyn and Cincinnati (both from the American Association)
- 1890
  - Boston
  - Chicago
  - New York
  - Philadelphia
  - Pittsburgh
  - Cleveland
  - Brooklyn
  - Cincinnati
- Between 1890 and 1891 seasons
  - Drop: none
  - Add: none
- 1891
  - Boston
  - Chicago
  - New York
  - Philadelphia
  - Pittsburgh
  - Cleveland
  - Brooklyn
  - Cincinnati
- Between 1891 and 1892 seasons
  - Drop: none
  - Add: Baltimore, Louisville, St. Louis and Washington (all from the American Association)
- 1892–1899
  - Boston
  - Chicago
  - New York
  - Philadelphia
  - Pittsburgh
  - Cleveland
  - Brooklyn
  - Cincinnati
  - Baltimore
  - Louisville
  - St. Louis
  - Washington

This lineup of teams remained the same from 1892 to the end of the 1899 season. After the 1899 season Baltimore, Cleveland, Louisville and Washington were dropped from the National League.

- 1900
  - Boston
  - Chicago
  - New York
  - Philadelphia
  - Pittsburgh
  - Brooklyn
  - Cincinnati
  - St. Louis

This lineup remained the same until Boston relocated to Milwaukee in 1953.

== See also ==
- List of National League pennant winners
- History of baseball team nicknames
