= History of baseball team nicknames =

This is a summary of the evolution of names of the current professional Major League Baseball teams in the National League (organized 1876) and subsequent rival American League (established 1901), and also of selected former major and minor league teams whose names were influential, long-lasting, or both. The sources of the names included club names, team colors, and city symbols. The names have sometimes been dubbed by the media, other times through conscious advertising marketing by the team, or sometimes a little of both.

Most sources today, including such authoritative references as The Official Encyclopedia of Baseball, The Baseball Encyclopedia, Total Baseball, baseballreference.com, the Library of Congress and even the Baseball Hall of Fame itself usually adhere to an artificial naming convention, dating from 1951, which conforms references to 19th-century teams to modern usage (City + Plural Nickname), and which is misleadingly anachronistic: few teams before 1900 had names, and adopting them only really caught on in the first decades of the 20th century. Team nicknames like the "Boston Beaneaters" and "Brooklyn Bridegrooms" were never official; they were the invention of inventive sportswriters. A few of these coinages actually did catch hold with the contemporary fan base, such as "Robins" and "Browns," and some remained popular long enough to be adopted officially, like "Giants" and "Pirates;" but many of the others were either ephemeral quips, like "Rustlers" and "Ruby Legs," or never existed at all, like "Pilgrims."

== Overview ==
Athletic teams have long used colors and nicknames as a form of team identity. This echoes the use of colors and nicknames in other activities such as heraldry, the military, and the flags of states, provinces and nations.

Baseball teams started using nicknames early in the sport's history, though not all felt the need for one. The purported first recorded game of baseball occurred in the mid-1840s between two teams named "New York" and "Knickerbocker." Both teams were actually based in New York City.

After the American Civil War (1861–1865), interest in highly skilled games of baseball resulted in many hundreds of local organized clubs springing up, many under the umbrella of the new National Association of Base Ball Players (NABBP) from 1857 to 1870, also sometimes referred to as "the amateur association". These were often with names that were the club's official name, now often erroneously retrofitted as the "nickname". However, all of these club names had the words "Base Ball Club" listed after them ("baseball" was usually spelled then as two words). Examples:

New York

- Knickerbocker B.B.C.
- Mutual B.B.C.

Brooklyn

- Atlantic B.B.C.
- Eckford B.B.C.

Philadelphia

- Athletic B.B.C.
- Olympic B.B.C.

Cleveland

- Forest City B.B.C.

Although many of the players on these clubs were de facto professionals, the first openly all-professional team was the Cincinnati "Red Stockings", an amateur team that turned professional and began a successful barnstorming tour in 1869. The fame of this team spelled the end of the high-level amateur version of the game. It was followed by a second "National Association", that of the National Association of Professional Base Ball Players (NAPBBP) during 1871–1875, with an increasing number of local clubs and for the first time, professional franchise teams. The Cincinnati Red Stockings team's newfangled uniform of knee-length "knickers" with bright colored high-topped socks or stockings also inspired the use of team colors serving a dual role as a team nickname for the sportswriters of the day, who could add variety to their prose by referring to, e.g., the Hartford club or "Hartfords" alternately as the "Dark Blues" based on their obvious characteristic clothing. None of these early 'color' nicknames were official or used by the teams themselves, however. According to the Association and then the League, the teams were simply e.g. the "Brooklyn B. B. C."

Examples:

- Boston: Red Stockings/Red Sox and Red Caps
- Chicago: White Stockings/White Sox
- Cincinnati: Red Stockings/Reds
- Hartford: Dark Blues/Blues
- Louisville: Grays
- Mutual: Green Stockings
- St. Louis: Brown Stockings/Browns and Red Stockings/Reds

Suggesting an awareness of the significance of colors, seven seasons after its 1876 founding, the following National League of Professional Base Ball Clubs (later known simply as the National League) in 1882 passed a rule requiring specific stocking colors for each team:

- Boston: Red
- Buffalo: Gray
- Chicago: White
- Cleveland: Navy blue
- Detroit: Old Gold
- Providence: Light Blue
- Troy: Green
- Worcester: Brown

While the 1882 rules prescribed stocking colors according to club, they also prescribed jersey and cap colors, but according to player position rather than according to club. Thus, on a single player's uniform, his cap and jersey would designate his position, and only his stockings would designate his club.

As the news and developing sports media (primarily newspapers) began covering games extensively and assigning specialists to write about them, the inventive scribes might use the established names, or they might invent some new ones. Initially, they often referred to a club in the plural form, either by its city name or by its club name. Examples:

- Athletics
- Bostons
- Chicagos
- Mutuals

As the writers and reporters became more inventive, they began to refer to teams by some characteristic that made the team or the city unique. Examples:

- Beaneaters (Boston)
- Colts (Chicago)
- Giants (New York)
- Spiders (Cleveland)
- Trolley Dodgers (Brooklyn)

When two or more major leagues existed simultaneously in one city, the writers often appended the league name, which occasionally had the chance of evolving also into a team nickname, especially in the then frequent cities of the Northeast with two teams, a representative in each league. (The Encyclopedia of Sports, p. 32) Examples:

- Baltimore Americans (later "Orioles" – also used by previous NL and AA franchises)
- Boston Nationals (later "Braves"), Boston Americans (later "Red Sox")
- New York Nationals (better known as "Giants"), New York Americans or "Highlanders" (evolved into "Yankees")

In some cases, such as the Cleveland Indians, the team actually solicited help from the media in inventing a new nickname.

Some of those nicknames changed over time or died with the team, while some are still in use today. All of the nicknames of the "classic 8" NL teams of 1900–1952 were originally unofficial. But once an unofficial nickname became popular enough, it might be adopted by the team and become official. This practice was already coming into vogue by 1901 and the formation of the American League; four of the upstart league's eight franchises had official team names right from the start. A couple of teams stuck with a name for several years and then changed it to something else, such as the Cleveland Napoleons > Indians, but most teams have never changed their names once officially adopted (other than teams which relocated to a new city). Some teams have had two popular nicknames simultaneously for many years. Examples:

- Brooklyn Dodgers/Robins
- Washington Senators/Nationals

In the modern era of sports franchise expansion, nicknames are no longer assigned in a haphazard way by the news media, but rather are chosen by the teams for marketing and advertising purposes. The names are chosen in order to establish a strong team identity, and to have an attractive logo to encourage sales of merchandise to fans, such as caps and shirts. Often the nickname will have some sort of historical, geographical, cultural or economic symbolic connection or representation of the city and more recently, the surrounding state.

Nonetheless, fans and media sportswriters may still apply informal tags in the old manner, such as the
"Redbirds" (St Louis Cardinals)
"Birds" or the "O's" (Baltimore Orioles)
"Bronx Bombers" (New York Yankees)
"Friars" (San Diego Padres)
"Halos" (Los Angeles Angels)
"Tribe" (Cleveland Indians).

== Atlanta ==
For years the minor league team in Atlanta was called the Crackers.

=== Atlanta Braves ===
The Braves nickname originated in Boston in 1912. (See the Boston, Massachusetts, entry below.) The Braves moved from Boston to Milwaukee before the 1953 season and were known as the Milwaukee Braves from 1953 to 1965. The team moved again to Atlanta before the 1966 season, and have been known as the Atlanta Braves since.

== Baltimore ==
=== Baltimore Orioles ===
Earliest official adoption: 1901

The team's nickname is taken from the Baltimore oriole (Icterus galbula), a small blackbird of the passerine family of fowl in the eastern United States. The bird received its name in about 1808 from the fact that the male's colors resembled those on the coat of arms of Sir George Calvert (1579–1632), the first Lord Baltimore, who was senior of the Calvert family that established the Province of Maryland colony in the 17th century. The Baltimore oriole is also the state bird symbol of modern Maryland.

Most of the professional baseball (and a few other sports) teams in Baltimore have been dubbed the "Orioles", with a few exceptions.

The earliest Baltimore clubs, in the early 1870s, were called "Lord Baltimore" and "Maryland" respectively. These clubs were short-lived. The "Lord Baltimore" team chose the unusual team color of yellow or a variation of gold, and was often called the Canaries or the Yellow Stockings. The Maryland club was simply called the "Marylands", in the pluralized style of the day. The names and colors were also used by other local jurisdictions and schools/colleges/universities.

The first club to be called the Baltimore Orioles was a charter member of the old American Association in 1882. When the AA league folded after the 1891 season, four of its teams were brought into the expanded National League (organized previously 1876), including Baltimore. This club became a dominant team in the older league during the 1890s under player-manager Ned Hanlon, in part because of their innovations and their tough, relentless play. The nickname "Orioles" first appears in the Spalding Guide in the 1895 edition which covered their first championship season, 1894; notably, the previous year's Guide never used the name at all. The term "Old Oriole" is sometimes used to describe a player whose aggressive style fits the legacy of those 1890s teams. The competitive famous team's fortunes took a downturn in 1899 when many of its stars were transferred to the Brooklyn Superbas/Dodgers, and Baltimore was one of the four teams contracted out of existence in 1900 when the NL reduced from 12 franchises to just 8, an arrangement lasting for over a half century.

The newly formed American League of 1901 wanted to compete directly with the National League's New York Giants, but the Giants used their political clout to block the American League from placing a club there. Instead, one of its 8 charter member franchise teams was placed in Baltimore in 1901. Their "Orioles" nickname was acknowledged in an unusual way that year, with an orange letter "O" on their uniform shirts, probably the only major league team ever to sport a symbol that looked like a "zero". The 1902 shirts substituted a more conventional block letter B. In 1903, after the American and National leagues settled their 2 year old "baseball war" dispute with a "peace pact", the National League allowed the American league to have a competing New York club in the nation's largest city and the Baltimore club, which was originally meant to have been located in New York from the beginning was bought by former player/manager, the legendary John McGraw and transferred to New York City abandoning the Orioles name and, since 1913, known as the New York Yankees.

A top-level minor league version of the Baltimore Orioles replaced the departed major league club, and it would be a force to be reckoned with in the "Triple AAA" high minors for 50 years, winning a number of International League championships and also providing a famed local boy, George Herman "Babe" Ruth to the major leagues in 1914.

Another Baltimore team was the rival third-party Federal League entry of 1914–1915, which called itself the Baltimore Terrapins, after the diamondback terrapin, the state reptile of Maryland now primarily associated with the University of Maryland, College Park Maryland Terrapins sports teams. The Federal League Terrapins opened Terrapin Park across the street from the IL minor league and previous AL club's own ballpark, which was acquired by the Orioles after the "Fed" folded. That began a chain of events which led to Baltimore's return to major league status, a story covered in more detail in the article on Memorial Stadium.

In 1954, the St. Louis Browns of the AL, another of the charter "original 8", moved to Baltimore, and the team adopted the city's old traditional baseball nickname.

Many fans, and the team itself, also refer to the team as the "O's" or the "Birds".

== Boston ==
"Neither team had a nickname [in 1901], nor would they for several more seasons. Both were simply called 'the Bostons,' although to differentiate between the two clubs, fans, sportswriters, and players commonly began referring to the NL entry as 'the Nationals,' and their American League counterparts as 'the Americans.' Other nicknames, such as the Pilgrims, Puritans, Plymouth Rocks, Somersets (so named after owner Charles Somers), or Collinsmen (after manager Collins) for the AL team and the Beaneaters, Triumvirs, or Seleemen (after manager Frank Selee) for the Nationals, were convenient inventions of the press. Their subsequent use by many historians is misleading. None of these nicknames was ever widely used by either fans or players."

=== Boston Braves ===
Earliest official adoption: 1912

Four players from the Cincinnati Red Stockings of 1869–1870 regrouped in Boston in 1871 (Robert Smith, Baseball in America, Holt, Rinehart & Winston, 1961, p. 36), which they would call home for the next 83 seasons. In the newly formed National Association of Professional Base Ball Players, the Boston Red Stockings would continue to dominate as they had in Cincinnati, winning 4 of the league's 5 pennants and joining the new National League in 1876.

Some sources (such as TSNBBG) say they were renamed the "Red Caps", presumably in deference to the revived Red Stockings entry in Cincinnati. Local newspapers referred to the club as both "Red Stockings" and "Red Caps". In any case, in the 1880s a few sportswriters (not in Boston) referred to them as the Beaneaters on a couple of occasions, a term used for Bostonians in general due to the prevalence of the staple dish baked beans. Boston itself is often called "Beantown," but generally not by residents. The media-invented nickname "Beaneaters" was still in occasional use in the early 1900s, and was even applied to the newly formed American League entry from time to time. The National Leaguers continued to include red trim in their uniforms until 1907, when they temporarily switched to an all-white uniform. The press promptly labeled them the Doves, reinforced by their owner being named Dovey. (Similarly, they were called the Rustlers in 1911 for new owner William Hepburn Russell.)

In 1908, the Americans adopted those colors and became the Red Sox. The Nationals reverted to their red trim and slowly looked for a name of their own. They found one when James Gaffney bought the club.

"The nickname of Braves was first given the club at the suggestion of John Montgomery Ward, when James E. Gaffney, from Tammany Hall, became club president in 1912. Previously, the club had been briefly nicknamed the Doves, a name bestowed on the team when George B. and John E. C. Dovey became its owners; and also the Red Caps and Beaneaters." (TSNBBG)

The Tammany Hall political organization was named after an American Indian chief and used an Indian image as its symbol, hence the "Braves". The 1912 team wore an Indian-head logo, and in 1915 the name "Braves." Over the years that name has stuck, despite occasional controversy about its stereotyping of Native Americans, and has followed the team through two moves — to Milwaukee in 1953, and to Atlanta in 1966.

While still in Boston, the Braves fell into severe doldrums in the 1930s, and were looking for ways to reinvent themselves.

"In 1936, when James A. Robert Quinn became president, the name of Bees was selected by a vote of scribes and fans. However, after a new syndicate, including Quinn, took charge in April, 1941, the stockholders re-adopted the nickname of Braves." (TSNBBG)

The name "Bees" did nothing to improve the team's fortunes, and was abandoned by the end of World War II. In 1935 the uniform shirts had read "BRAVES" and in 1936 they merely said "BOSTON" on the home as well as the road version. They switched to a block "B" on home shirts the next year, which remained the pattern most years until the block-letter "BRAVES" reappeared in 1945. At no point did they wear anything on their uniforms which suggested an actual bee other than the homonym of the letter "B". In 1946, the script version of "Braves", complete with tomahawk, made its first appearance and has been on most of the uniform shirts since then. (Okkonen)

The Washington Redskins of the NFL began in 1932 as the Boston Braves. They renamed themselves the Redskins the next year, having moved from Braves Field to the Red Sox' Fenway Park, serving the dual purpose of sounding similar to their new baseball co-tenants while allowing them to keep the Native American-logoed uniforms they had worn as the Braves, and in 1937 they moved to Washington, D.C., bringing the nickname with them.

=== Boston Red Sox ===
Earliest official adoption: 1912 (1908)

For years many sources have called the early Boston AL teams "Pilgrims" or "Puritans" or "Plymouth Rocks" or "Somersets" for owner Charles Somers or even the "Speed Boys". Research by SABR writer Bill Nowlin demonstrated that none of those names was used very often and that "Pilgrims", the most popular revisionist nickname today, was barely used at all.

In 1901, the American League, led by Ban Johnson, declared itself equal to the National League and established a competing club in Boston. For seven seasons, the AL team wore dark blue stockings and had no official nickname. They were simply "Boston" or "the Bostons"; or the "Americans" or "Boston Americans" as in "American Leaguers", Boston being a two-team city. Their 1901–1907 shirts, both home and road, simply read "Boston", except for 1902 when they sported large letters "B" and "A" denoting "Boston" and "American".

The temporary decision by the Boston National Leaguers to drop the color red from their uniforms led to a history-making decision:

"Red Stockings had been part of all Boston National League teams up to 1907, but Fred Tenney, manager in that year, told Peter F. Kelley, the Boston Journal's baseball writer, he would abandon the red stockings tradition in favor of white stockings, because of the danger that colored stockings might cause leg injuries to become infected. Kelley wrote a story condemning Tenney for parting with the Boston National League club's tradition. The next day, John Irving Taylor, Boston American League club president, told the Boston Journal writer, 'Here's a scoop for you. I am going to grab the name Red Sox, and the Boston American League club will wear red stockings." (TSNBBG)

The problem with part of that story is that the "Doves" went through the entire 1907 season wearing white (except for a red old-English "B" on their shirts) while the American Leaguers continued to wear their dark blue during the 1907 season. (Okkonen)

On December 18, 1907, owner Taylor announced that the club had officially adopted red as its new team color. The name Red Sox is non-standard English for "Red Socks", short for "Red Stockings". For the 1908 season, the AL team shirts featured a red stocking across the front labeled "BOSTON". They also wore red stockings, along with white caps. Meanwhile, for 1908, the NL team returned to wearing red stockings as well as red caps, while retaining the old-English "B". So the primary visual differences between the two teams' uniforms in 1908 were the caps and the shirt fronts.

The red stocking on the shirt front was a one-year innovation before returning to the plain "BOSTON". The familiar "RED SOX" first appeared in 1912, coincident with the opening of Fenway Park. Through the years, the Red Sox have continued to wear red somewhere in their uniforms. By the 1930s, the color blue was re-added to the mix. (Okkonen)

Headline writers often call the team "Bosox", to contrast with the Chicago White Sox or "Chisox". As with Chicago, when the team's fans are talking about their own team, they are apt to call them simply "The Sox".

== Brooklyn ==
Together with New York City across the East River, Brooklyn was the cradle of organized baseball, producing some of the strongest clubs of the amateur and early professional era; these included Atlantic, Eckford and Excelsior. Atlantic turned pro in 1869 and became nationally famous by ending the Cincinnati Red Stockings' winning streak in 1870.

=== Brooklyn Dodgers ===
Earliest official adoption: 1916

The Dodgers have had a number of nicknames through the years.

This team began as the Brooklyn Atlantics in the American Association of the 1880s, its name a reference to the storied amateur club of the 1860s. Reporters also tagged them the Grays, the typical uniform-color reference of the day. These however were very occasional; overwhelmingly newspaper writeups simply called them "Brooklyn" or, more often, "the Brooklyns."

In 1888, six members of the team were married during the season, and the press tagged the club as the Bridegrooms or just the Grooms. (TSNBBG)

In the early 1890s, the club had switched to the National League. The city of Brooklyn installed the transportation innovation called the trolley system. Its citizens thus became "trolley dodgers" to the newswriters. By association, the team itself acquired that nickname, as the honeymoon for the "Grooms" was over after several years. (TSNBBG) Officially, however, the team remained the Brooklyn Base Ball Association, sans nickname.

Brooklyn was a separate city from New York until 1898, and its teams retained the name "Brooklyn".

During the late 1890s, when Ned Hanlon was the manager and the Dodgers won the pennant (thanks in part to raiding the Baltimore Orioles roster), there happened to be a stage or circus act called "The Hanlons' Superba". The New York press, in their usual creative way, began calling Ned Hanlon's Dodgers the Superbas. (TSNBBG)

Around 1910, the club was briefly tagged as the Infants, from a remark by president Charles Ebbets, who had declared in a speech that "Baseball is in its infancy." In the words of TSNBBG, "The monicker clung until Thomas J. Lynch, then president of the National League, asked baseball writers to accept waivers on it."

Once Wilbert Robinson was well established and beloved as the Dodgers manager, the team was called the Robins as often as anything. The nickname "Dodgers" continued to be used also. After Robby retired, the team became just the "Dodgers" again. The club finally acknowledged its informal nickname in 1916, when the home World Series programs were boldly titled "Dodgers vs Red Sox;" and yet, that same season, the Brooklyn Eagle used "Superbas" in its box scores, years after Hanlon's retirement, and a cartoon on the record 26-inning game vs Boston that year used a robin to represent the team. In 1933, the team put the word "Dodgers" on their shirts for the first time, in block letters. The famous script "Dodgers" first appeared in 1938. (Okkonen)

When the club moved to the west coast in 1958, they brought their nickname with them, although it had no particular meaning in Los Angeles.

The "Bums" nickname arose due to the cartoons of Willard Mullin, characterizing the citizenry of Brooklyn in an unflattering but humorous way.

== Chicago ==
Chicago is unique in Major League Baseball in that both of its charter member clubs have remained in their original cities. Various other clubs had brief lifespans in the Windy City also.

The entry in the one-year wonder called the Union Association was called the Chicago Browns by some writers. The club lasted half a season and then transferred to Pittsburgh where, continuing their color scheme, they were called the Stogies.

The Players' League was a one-year rebellion by players. The entry in the Windy City, called the Chicago Pirates, were led by Charles Comiskey, who would return to the South Side nine years later, as an owner, and with a decidedly more conservative attitude toward player salaries.

When the Federal League began its two-year experiment, it placed a team in Chicago. Although the Fed was known for colorful nicknames, the best anyone could come up with for the Chicago Federals' first year, 1914, was the Chi-Feds. For the second and final Fed season, which proved to be a pennant winner for the Chi-Feds, the name Chicago Whales was used, despite the lack of any known whales in Lake Michigan. The uniforms featured a whale icon inside a large round "C", suggestive of the Cubs' logo of that time, a large round "C" encircling a bear cub. (Okkonen) The Chi-Fed Whales' lasting legacy is Wrigley Field, which the Cubs moved into after the Federal League collapsed and have played there ever since.

=== Chicago Cubs ===
First official use: 1907

In 1870, the first openly professional team in Chicago, officially named simply the Chicago Ball Club, was dubbed the White Stockings, in reference to the team colors and in contrast to the Cincinnati Red Stockings. The team carried that nickname along to the NA in 1871 and into the NL in 1876. The Chicago club was indeed frequently referred to in newspaper articles as the White Stockings right from the 1870 season onward, making it one of the few "real" nicknames among those artificially retrofitted to the era's teams by sportswriters.

After the team's successes in the first half of the 1880s, the club began trading away its stars, and by the end of the decade the team was populated by young players, with the exception of long-time player–manager Cap Anson. By the late 1880s, local newspapers had started to call the team "Anson's Colts", or just "Colts". With the advent of the Players' League in 1890, what little talent the club still had was drained away, and the nickname, though never "official", became standard. (The Golden Era Cubs: 1876–1940, Eddie Gold and Art Ahrens, Bonus Books, 1985, p. 2) and

"Charley Hoyt wrote a play for Cap Anson, manager of the team, called 'The Runaway Colt', and subsequently the team was called Anson's Colts."(TSNBBG) Actually, it was the other way around. The play was written and produced late in 1895, and its name was inspired by the club's nickname. (The National Pastime, Number 25, SABR, 2005, "Anson on Broadway", p.74-81.)

In any case, 1890 is the usual date given for the replacement of "White Stockings" with "Colts" as the club's predominant nickname. The 1894 Spalding Guide refers to the team—once—as "Anson's so-called Chicago 'colts'."

The Colts name would stick around, off and on, for the next 15 years. It was reinforced by a squad of many young players, contrasting with the veteran Anson, who had become known as "Pop" by the 1890s. Anson left the team after the 1897 season, and the local papers called the team the Orphans for a while, because they had lost their "Pop". They apparently still had some "pop" in their bats, finishing fourth in a twelve-team league.

"A Chicago newspaper held a contest to select a new name. The term Cubs was chosen, but as other newspapers ignored the name at first, it was some time before the new nickname came into general use. Fred Hayner, sports editor of the Chicago Daily News, was among the first to use the name of Cubs." (TSNBBG)

The 2007 Arcadia book called Chicago Cubs: Tinker to Evers to Chance, by Art Ahrens, contains a series of facts in various places on pages 9–56 that add up to an explanation of the gradual transition from "Colts" to "Cubs":

- The newspapers predominantly called the club the "Orphans" during 1898–1900.
- The few promising players on the club jumped to the new American League in 1901, including several to the White Sox. The erstwhile "Orphans" had so few good players left that the papers called them the "Remnants", as the 53–86 team's percentage would stand as the club's record low for the next 60 years.
- When Frank Selee took over the managerial reins in 1902, his youth program revived the older nickname, and the team was again called the "Colts" in the papers frequently.
- At that same time, also referencing the team's youthful squad, some writers starting calling the team the "Cubs".
- The "Cubs" nickname took hold over the next four seasons. Sporting Life leaned toward "Cubs", while The Sporting News favored "Colts", as did the Chicago Tribune. During 1905, "Colts" was still more common, as Selee preferred that name. But Selee retired due to ill health in mid-season 1905, and Frank Chance was elevated to the managing job. With new management and an emerging dynasty, by 1906 the old "Colts" was largely passé and "Cubs" was the primary nickname.
- Among various short-lived and little-remembered nicknames laid on the team by the media around 1906, perhaps the funniest was "Murphy's Spuds" or just "Spuds", a reference to Irish-American team owner Charles Murphy, and the stereotype connecting Irish people with potatoes. (Irish potatoes were colloquially called "Murphy spuds" or just "Murphys").

By the time the Chicago National Leaguers played their cross-town World Series with the White Sox in 1906, the "Chicago Cubs" nickname was well established. An editorial cartoon after the Series showed a cabin with an unknown figure inside, with only his white socks visible, up on a footrest, with the skin of a bear nailed to the wall outside, and six more white socks hanging on a clothesline (the Sox had beaten the Cubs in six games). (John Devaney and Burt Goldblatt, The World Series: A Complete Pictorial History, Rand McNally, 1975, p. 27).

By 1907, the name "Cubs" was appearing on the team's scorecards. (Ahrens) The first uniform acknowledgment of the nickname came in 1908, when a bear cub holding a bat was placed inside the round "C" that was already on the uniform shirt. The 1908 World Series home programs used both the Cubs name and image frequently. The familiar "C" encircling "UBS" first appeared the following year, on the road shirts. With this official acknowledgment, the old nickname of "Colts" was gone for good. Either a bear cub symbol or the word "CUBS" has appeared on home and/or road shirts ever since then. (Okkonen)

Despite the best efforts of the MLB Promotion Corporation, which began in the late 1960s, the Cubs did not trademark this iconic circle-C-UBS logo (which has been a steady fixture on uniforms and publications since 1937) until the late 1970s.

The nickname "Cubbies", a diminutive of something already small or young, gained favor in large part due to Harry Caray's famous rendering of "Take Me Out to the Ball Game". Instead of drawing out the single-syllable "Cubs" into two syllables in place of "home team", Caray used "Cubbies" to make the line flow better.

The Chicago Bears of the National Football League played their games at the Cubs' Wrigley Field from 1921 to 1970, and were renamed (from "Staleys") in honor of their hosts.

=== Chicago White Sox ===
First official use: 1906 (Stockings); 1912 (Sox)

"Anson's National Leaguers had been known as the White Stockings, and when Charles Comiskey brought his St. Paul Saints team into the city of his birth in 1900, Carl Green of Detroit and Irving E. (Si) Sanborn, covering baseball in the Windy City, revived the name White Stockings." (TSNBBG)

The new American League entry adopted the abandoned colors and nickname of their National League rivals. They were initially called the "White Stockings", a nickname quickly shortened to White Sox by the press. The transition can be seen in the 1906 Spalding Guide, in which both "White Stockings" and "White Sox" appear. In 1912, the team started wearing the first incarnation of its "SOX" logo on the shirts. (Okkonen)

The team is often called the "Chisox" by headline writers, to distinguish from "Bosox". The synonym "Pale Hose" is also used. Within the city, as with Boston, the team is often just plain "Sox". The Hispanic community of Chicago calls them Las Medias Blancas, Spanish for "The White Stockings".

== Cincinnati ==
=== Cincinnati Red Stockings ===
The first openly all-professional team was the famous Cincinnati Red Stockings of 1869–1870. They began as an amateur organization in the National Association of Base Ball Players in 1866, as interest in baseball grew substantially after the American Civil War. Interest in the Red Stockings themselves grew as they compiled an impressive winning streak while mostly on a road tour or "barnstorming". The nickname "Red Stockings" was originally a press appellation based on their uniforms, in fact the 1869 Cincinnati club inaugurated the baseball tradition of wearing knickers with knee socks instead of long trousers, a style some contemporary prudes considered shocking and immoral; but player/manager Harry Wright quickly saw its appeal for marketing purposes and by midseason the club had adopted the name and called itself the Red Stockings Base Ball Club of Cincinnati.

The Red Stockings went through 1869 and partway into 1870 undefeated, their streak finally ending on June 14, 1870. Interest in the team waned after that, and while the club gained much fame and acclaim, the team's profit margin was slim. The club's executives decided to disband the team for 1871. But the influence of this team was substantial. By 1870, professionalism was wide open, spelling the end of the "amateur era", and paving the way to the first professional league, the National Association of Professional Base Ball Players, which began operating in 1871.

With the Cincinnati Red Stockings dissolved, four of its players regrouped in Boston to join the new National Association (often called the NA for short, by modern historians). Manager Harry Wright and his brother George Wright (baseball's version of the "Wright brothers") brought along Cal McVey and Charlie Gould to form the Boston Red Stockings, which eventually evolved into the Atlanta Braves (q.v.)

=== Cincinnati Reds ===
First official use: 1911

Due to the influence of the Red Stockings, nearly every professional team in Cincinnati since then has worn red as their primary trim color. The Cincinnati teams have also tended to associate themselves with the 1869–70 club, but there is no direct connection other than the name.

When the NA folded, the best teams, and some new ones, regrouped to form the National League in 1876. One of the new teams was called the Cincinnati Red Stockings, reclaiming the old name. The team was expelled from the National League in 1880 for selling beer at games and playing on Sundays.

In 1882 a new league formed to challenge the established NL: The American Association. The AA appealed to a different, rowdier market than the stoic NL, by offering cheaper admission prices as well as alcoholic beverages, which at that time were forbidden in the NL ballparks. Ironically, this "AA" became known as "The Beer and Whisky League", and was criticized by the NL leadership for placing so many of its teams in "river towns", characterizing the AA cities as being populated by low-class citizens: Pittsburgh, Cincinnati, Louisville and St. Louis.

The new version of the Cincinnati Red Stockings (later shortened to Cincinnati Reds; the earliest mention of "Reds" in the Spalding Guide dates from the 1895 edition) became prosperous. The team won the first American Association pennant, and survived most of Association's ten-year existence, transferring to the National League in 1890. For 1891, a short lived "Cincinnati Reds" entry joined the Association, otherwise known as "Kelly's Killers". The club failed to finish the season and was replaced by Milwaukee. By then the Association was floundering, and collapsed after the season ended. The NL Reds continue to play in Cincinnati to this day.

The team first used the single "C" on its uniforms in 1905. The word "Reds" was placed inside the "C" for the first time in 1911. Variants on that style have been used in most years since then. (Okkonen)

Having shortened their name brought them some trouble in the 1950s, or more accurately the fear of trouble. The term "Reds" in the political arena had long been a synonym for "Communist". During the McCarthy era, even though there was no connection between professional baseball and Communism, the team was concerned that their traditional club nickname would associate them with the Communist Threat and the Cold War, so they officially changed their name to the "Cincinnati Redlegs". From 1956 to 1960, the club's logo was altered to remove the term "REDS" from the inside of the "wishbone C" symbol. The "REDS" reappeared on the 1961 uniforms, although habits being what they were, by then they were often called "Redlegs", and that name took a few years to totally fade out. (Okkonen)

An NFL entry that played briefly in the early 1930s was called the Cincinnati Reds.

The nickname "Red Stockings" and its descendants reflect one of the oldest nicknames in baseball, topped only by the Athletics, originally of Philadelphia and now in West Sacramento, and "Mets", a variation of "Metropolitans", a name that goes back to an amateur baseball club in New York in the 1850s.

== Cleveland ==
Cleveland is known as "The Forest City", and its early-1870s pro team was called the Forest City Base Ball Club or just the "Forest Citys", in the style of the day. During the 1871 season, "Cleveland" was often part of their name in newspapers, to distinguish from the Rockford Forest Citys of the same league.

The National League entry of the 1890s was dubbed the Cleveland Spiders by the press, supposedly because of its long-limbed players. One player during 1897–1899 was Louis Sockalexis, a Native American. His ballplaying skills caught a great deal of attention, though his career was short. During those three seasons, the team was sometimes called the Cleveland Indians.

=== Cleveland Indians ===
First official use: 1915

After the 1899 debacle of 20 wins and 134 losses, in which the once-proud Spiders were redubbed the "Wanderers" and the "Exiles" due to being relegated to a road franchise, the NL contracted the Cleveland club out of existence. A new team formed the very next year in the young American League. The uniforms featured dark blue, and the team was labeled the "Blues" and "Bluebirds" by the media, among other short-lived nicknames.

In 1903 club ownership conducted a newspaper contest to choose a name for the team, and selected Napoleons for newly acquired star player-manager Napoleon Lajoie; in popular usage this was quickly shortened to "Naps." The fact that they would go to the papers is a reflection of where most of the team nicknames of that era came from. During the tenure of manager Deacon McGuire, the team was also sometimes facetiously called the "Molly Maguires". (TSNBBG)

The team was strong in the early 1900s, but lapsed in the 1910s and "Naps" began to be taken as a joke equated to "sleeping". When Lajoie was traded to the Philadelphia Athletics in early January 1915, owner Charles Somers asked the local newspapers again to come up with a new name for the team. Legend has it that the team specifically honored Louis Sockalexis when it assumed the name "Indians" in mid-January 1915. Another version is that the media and the team chose Cleveland Indians as a play on the name of the Boston Braves, then known as the "Miracle Braves" after going from last place on July 4 to a sweep in the 1914 World Series. The informal "Indians" name sometimes used during Sockalexis' time with the club reinforced the new name.

With the artificial connection to Native Americans, the Cleveland Indians were also often called "The Tribe".

In the movie Major League, the Cleveland Indians are referred to by many names, including "The Erie Warriors", "The Sons of Geronimo" and "The Fighting Braves of the Cuyahoga."

=== Cleveland Guardians ===
First official use: 2022

In 2020, the club joined other sports franchises with Native American names in exploring whether to modify or change their names. It was announced that the team would cease using the name "Indians" following the 2021 baseball season, after which they would change their name to the Cleveland Guardians.

The name "Guardians" was inspired by the eight "Guardians of Traffic" Art Deco statues displayed on the Hope Memorial Bridge near their home field.

== Dallas–Fort Worth ==
There have been minor league clubs in the Dallas – Fort Worth area since at least 1888. One was the Dallas Rangers of the Pacific Coast League, and the other was the Fort Worth Cats/Panthers of the Texas League. In 1965, the Dallas club left the city, and the Fort Worth club moved to Arlington, a city about halfway in between the two major cities. The renamed Dallas-Fort Worth Spurs operated for seven years in Arlington before the majors came knocking.

=== Texas Rangers ===
First official use: 1972

The 1961 expansion version of the Washington Senators moved to Arlington, Texas, in 1972 and took on the nickname Texas Rangers. The name refers to the famous Texas Ranger Division, the law enforcement agency that was created by Stephen F. Austin in 1823. Up until the end of the 2008 season, the team bore the word "RANGERS" on their home jerseys and "TEXAS" on their road jerseys. Since then, the team has worn "TEXAS" at home and on the road.

== Denver ==
=== Colorado Rockies ===
The Colorado Rockies became a new franchise into Major League Baseball in 1993. The nickname "Rockies" alludes to the Rocky Mountains which cover much of the western half of Colorado. The name Colorado Rockies had been used by a National Hockey League team that lasted from 1976 to 1982, before the team relocated and became the New Jersey Devils.

== Detroit ==
The first major league team in the city was dubbed the Wolverines, who contended in the National League during 1881–1888. The nickname, which is now primarily associated with the University of Michigan teams, came from Michigan's nickname, the "Wolverine State".

The club's ownership spent a great deal of money to bring a championship team to Detroit, and the team won an early World Series in 1887. However, Detroit at the time did not have a large enough population to sustain a major league franchise, and the team folded after one more season.

Several minor league clubs came and went over the next few years, typically tagged as Wolverines.

=== Detroit Tigers ===
First official use: 1901

The new minor league entry in the Western League was also called the Wolverines. This club came to stay. The league was renamed the American League in 1900, and the Detroit franchise is still in the league, the one Western League franchise still in its original city, nurtured as it was by the growth of the auto industry in the 20th century.

There are various legends about how the Tigers got their nickname. One involves the orange stripes they wore on their black stockings:

"Philip J. Reid, a Detroit city editor, tagged the players as Tigers before the turn of the century. George Stallings, manager at Detroit during 1899–1901, always claimed the nickname came after he put striped stockings on his players, but they have always been Tigers in the American League." (TSNBBG)

Another legend concerns a sportswriter equating the 1901 team's opening day victory with the ferocity of his alma mater, the Princeton Tigers.

The earliest known use of the name Detroit Tigers in the news was in the Detroit Free Press on April 16, 1895.

Richard Bak's 1998 book, A Place for Summer: A Narrative History of Tiger Stadium has the full story. In the 19th century, the city of Detroit had a military unit called the Detroit Light Guard, who were known as "The Tigers". They had played significant roles in certain Civil War battles and in the Spanish–American War. The baseball team was called both the "Wolverines" and the "Tigers" in the newspapers. Upon entry into the major leagues in 1901, the ballclub sought and received formal permission from the Light Guard to use its trademark, and from that day forth the team has been officially the "Tigers". Certainly when the team started major-league play in 1901, they were already wearing a tiger logo on their caps.

In short, the Tigers most likely wore stripes because they were already Tigers, rather than the other way around which was the conventional story. In fact, the Tigers wore a red stripe on their socks in 1901, and generally avoided stripes after that until beginning to wear orange stripes for a while in the 1920s. (Okkonen)

The Detroit Lions of the NFL were named in reference to their then-landlords, the Tigers.

The Detroit Red Wings of the NHL were originally called the "Cougars", but that referred to their point of origin as the Victoria Cougars. Their early name's apparent relationship to the Tigers and/or Lions was coincidental.

The University of Detroit, the main predecessor to today's University of Detroit Mercy, initially used "Tigers" as its athletic nickname. The school changed its nickname to Titans in 1919 or 1924, depending on the source. This nickname remained in use for the rest of UD's separate existence, and was inherited by UDM upon the 1990 merger with Mercy College of Detroit that created the current university.

== Houston ==
The minor league teams of first the Texas League and then the American Association were primarily known as the Houston Buffaloes, or often just "Buffs". They were named after Houston's Buffalo Bayou, which has always been a geographic and culturally significant hallmark of the city.

=== Houston Astros ===
Houston joined Major League Baseball in 1962 when the National League expanded and placed a franchise in Texas for the first time. The team's original nickname was the Houston Colt .45s, a reference to the famous Colt firearms company. The team itself used a Colt .45s logo, but was most often called just the "Colts", a somewhat ambiguous term as it also applies to young horses and skirted the legal issues that eventually influenced the name's abandonment by the club.

In 1965 the team changed its nickname to Houston Astros, a name that had more futuristic overtones (astro is Greek for "star") as since 1961 Houston was the city where NASA trained (and continues to train) all the American astronauts. The team also used the nickname as part of its new home, the Astrodome, which opened in 1965.

This name change was driven in part by legal considerations. The Sporting News Official Baseball Guide for 1965 explained why the team was renamed: "Late in the year 1964 the Harris County Domed Stadium was officially named the Astrodome after the Houston club changed its nickname, December 1, from Colt .45s to Astros. The move resulted from objections by the Colt Firearms Company to the club's sales of novelties bearing the old nickname."

The nickname 'Stros is often used as a familiar name.

== Kansas City, Missouri ==
Being at the fringe of the old west, and thus connected with cowboys and cattle, several of Kansas City's teams have had nicknames reflecting that culture.

There were three different short-lived major league teams in the 1800s, members of the Union Association in 1884, the National League in 1886, and the American Association in 1888 and 1889. The 1880s were the peak years of the great western cattle drives, and Kansas City the biggest of all cow-towns; it was inevitable that sportswriters would tag these men from the Wild West as "Cowboys."

The minor league entry in the Western League (original) in the late 1890s was the first to be called the Kansas City Blues, presumably from their team colors. The Western League became the American League in 1900, still a minor league. When the American went major in 1901, the Kansas City entry was dropped.

A revived minor league club also called the Kansas City Blues operated in the American Association during the first half of the 20th century. The team became a New York Yankees farm team in the 1930s. The team transferred to Denver in 1955 when the Philadelphia Athletics came to town as the Kansas City Athletics. Ironically, that "Yankees Kansas City farm club" situation continued, as the A's ownership fed numerous quality players to the Yankees until the 1960s when Charles O. Finley acquired the team. Finley soon incurred the wrath of Kansas City fans also, and transferred the team to Oakland in 1968.

Perhaps the most famous team in Kansas City was the Kansas City Monarchs, the longest-running of the various Negro league baseball teams that operated as an apartheid culture until major league baseball was integrated in 1947 by one-time Monarch Jackie Robinson. Continuing the dubious Kansas City tradition, the Monarchs effectively served as a "farm club" for all of the major leagues in their waning years, supplying a number of star black players to the majors before folding in the 1960s.

=== Kansas City Athletics ===
In 1954, the club's last year in Philadelphia, the "A" was replaced for the first time with the word "Athletics", on both home and road jerseys. At no time during their 54-year tenure in Philadelphia did the word "Philadelphia" appear on their shirts. The team transferred to Kansas City in 1955, and continued to wear "Athletics" on both home and road jerseys. The city name finally appeared on road shirts for the first time in 1961, after Charles O. Finley had acquired the team. Finley began a well-documented series of influential uniform innovations that are beyond the scope of this article. He moved the A's to Oakland in 1968. (Okkonen) In 2025, the team began temporarily playing its home games in West Sacramento, California and was simply called the Athletics with no city or state included in its name. The Athletics plan to move to Las Vegas, after a new stadium not yet constructed becomes available. In 1972, Finley changed the team's official name to the longstanding short-form nickname "A's"; "Athletics" was restored in 1981.

=== Kansas City Royals ===
The American League expanded in 1969, and made good on a pledge to return the majors to Kansas City, by creating the Kansas City Royals. Pharmaceutical executive Ewing Kauffman won the bidding for the new Kansas City team, which was named the Royals after the American Royal Livestock Show held in Kansas City every year since 1899. Some sources have incorrectly reported that the team was named in honor of the Kansas City Monarchs. Apparently it is just a happy coincidence. Also, in an unspoken and possibly coincidental continuation of tradition, the Royals' uniforms carry blue trim.

== Los Angeles area ==
The minor league teams had been known as the Los Angeles Angels since the founding of the Pacific Coast League in 1903, named after the city itself. That team name contained a built-in redundancy if fully translated into English: "The The Angels Angels".

=== Los Angeles Dodgers ===
The minor league team and the nickname were displaced when the Brooklyn Dodgers of the National League moved coast-to-coast in 1958. The Los Angeles Dodgers carried their successful ways, and there were no trolleys to be dodged in Los Angeles.

=== Los Angeles Angels ===
When major league baseball expanded in 1961, a new entry in the American League revived the old nickname. The team was renamed the California Angels in 1965, anticipating their move to Anaheim.

After 32 years as "California", the team became the "Anaheim Angels" starting with the 1997 season, as a result of a contractual agreement connected with renovations to their stadium.

Starting with the 2005 season, the club again changed its name. The ownership wanted to revert to the original name, Los Angeles Angels, for marketing reasons. This caused legal problems with the city of Anaheim, since the franchise was contractually required to keep "Anaheim" in the team name. As a result, the official designation became the wordy "Los Angeles Angels of Anaheim" with the geographic location removed from the team's jerseys.

In 2016, the team's name once again became "Los Angeles Angels" with Anaheim dropped.

The Angels are commonly nicknamed "the Halos".

== Miami ==
=== Florida / Miami Marlins ===
Minor league teams had been known as the Miami Marlins for several decades, referencing the marlin, a popular sport fish. There were the Miami Marlins of the International League (1956–1960) and the Miami Marlins (1962–1970) and Miami Marlins (1982–1988) of the Florida State League.

When the major leagues expanded to the Miami area in 1993, the old nickname was revived, but the team was initially known as the Florida Marlins. By identifying with the entire state instead of the city, the name's alliterative quality was lost. However, the team officially adopted the Miami Marlins name on November 11, 2011. This was part of a funding agreement between the team and the city of Miami for the team's new stadium which opened in 2012.

The Marlins are commonly nicknamed "the Fish".

== Milwaukee ==
Milwaukee's various professional teams, going back to the 1870s, had names like the Cream Citys and the Brewers, in reference to the local unique cream brick industry and brewing industry respectively. In particular, some famous breweries included Schlitz ("The beer that made Milwaukee famous"), Blatz, Pabst, and later Miller Beer, which held naming rights to the current stadium from its construction in 2001, until it was rebranded American Family Field in 2020.

There was a short-lived major league entry, sometimes called the Milwaukee Grays, which operated in the National League in 1878.

=== Milwaukee Brewers ===
The Brewers of the minor Western League of the 1890s were retained during the league's inaugural major league season as the American League in 1901, before being moved to become the St. Louis Browns.

The revived minor league club in the American Association was then called the Milwaukee Brewers for some 50 years before being displaced by the transplanted Boston Braves in 1953. The major league club retained their traditional nickname as the Milwaukee Braves during their stay in Milwaukee, before moving on to Atlanta in 1966.

The city was mostly without professional baseball for a few years. Future team owner and later Commissioner Bud Selig began a lobbying group originally called "Team, Inc." and then renamed "Milwaukee Brewers Baseball Club, Inc." The Chicago White Sox played some home games in Milwaukee in that interval.

The current Milwaukee Brewers began as the Seattle Pilots, a 1969 expansion team in the American League. After one year of significant financial losses, the team was transplanted to Milwaukee, under the new ownership of Selig, whereupon they revived the traditional name "Brewers". The team was switched to the National League in 1998 as part of the expansion and reorganization of the major leagues.

== Minneapolis – Saint Paul ==
The two adjacent cities have had a long-standing, mostly-friendly rivalry, and each city had high-level minor league clubs, including teams in the American Association for the better part of five decades. The Minneapolis clubs were usually called the Minneapolis Millers, Minneapolis being known as the "Mill City". St. Paul, as the state capital, avoided the usual stereotype of teams called "Senators", "Solons" or "Capitals", and instead went for a more direct stereotype. The city's early teams were typically called the St. Paul Saints or Apostles, including the city's short lived Union Association entry in 1884. Later the city's minor league clubs adopted the St. Paul Saints nickname, a self-contained redundancy. The Western League club from the 1890s moved to Chicago in 1900 and became the Chicago White Sox. The revived minor league Saints joined their cross-river rivals in the American Association for much of the first half of the 1900s. The Saints name was revived by an independent minor league club in 1993.

=== Minnesota Twins ===
Minneapolis – St. Paul is commonly known as the "Twin Cities". The formal name of the team, which transferred from Washington, D.C., in 1961, was initially the Twin Cities Baseball Club, now known as Twins Sports, Inc. The Millers caps had featured an "M" and the Saints caps an interlaced "StP". The newly transferred Minnesota Twins club wore a cap featuring "TC" for "Twin Cities" to honor both St. Paul and Minneapolis. The shirts included a sleeve patch with an outline of the state and two ballplayers (known as "Minnie and Paul") shaking hands across the Mississippi River.

By 1987 the Twins were regionally established, and a cap featuring an "M" for "Minnesota" was adopted. The "TC" logo migrated to the sleeve in place of the previous patch. The team won the World Series that year, so the "M" cap became a symbol of success and continued to be used exclusively for a number of years afterward. The "TC" cap reappeared in the late 1990s, and was switched off with the "M" cap until the 2009 season, retired after the team's 2010 move to Target Field. (Okkonen) "TC" is usually used as the team's home cap, with "M" as the road cap, though the cap, as with other elements of the team's uniform, is chosen at the whim of the starting pitcher.

Another nickname used by fans and writers, but not by the team, is "Twinkies", though that name is used more as an insult by the fans of competing teams, or by disgruntled local fans when the team is performing poorly.

== Montreal ==
Before Major League Baseball expanded to Montreal in 1969, minor league teams in Montreal were usually named the "Royals", in reference to Mount Royal (French: Mont Réal), a volcanic plug immediately west of today's downtown after which the city was named. Hence another redundancy, the "Mount Royal Royals".

=== Montreal Expos ===
The Montreal Expos were named in honor of Expo 67, a World's Fair held two years before the Expos began play. The Expos moved to Washington in 2005, and the "Expos" name was retired.

== New York City ==
As the cradle of organized baseball, New York City had many clubs in the "amateur" era leading up to 1869–1870, and the "professional" era after that. Knickerbocker, Mutual and Gotham were some of the more prominent clubs.

The short-lived Federal League entry in New York was the Brooklyn Tip-Tops. The Fed teams had some innovative names, and this was probably the only major league team ever named for a loaf of bread.

=== New York Mets ===
Since the amateur Metropolitan Base Ball Club was founded in New York as far back as 1857, three years before Athletic of Philadelphia, the Mets can claim to have the oldest team name in major-league baseball.

The first professional Metropolitan Baseball Club was a member of the 19th-century American Association, lasting until 1887, but unable to compete with the Giants. They were normally listed as "Metropolitan" in the standings, and writers would sometimes use the pluralized "Metropolitans" or just "Mets" in the style of the day, to distinguish them from the "New Yorks", their next-door neighbors. The Metropolitans were never referred to as "New York."

When major league baseball expanded in 1962, the old name was revived in the form of the Metropolitan Baseball Club of New York, otherwise known as the New York Mets. "Met" is a common short form of "Metropolitan", as in "The Met" for the Metropolitan Opera; "MetLife" for the Metropolitan Life Insurance Company; and so on.

The New York Jets of the NFL, originally known as the New York Titans, were the first of several New York area teams whose names rhymed with "Mets". Others included the New York Nets of the ABA (now the Brooklyn Nets of the NBA), and the New York Sets of World Team Tennis.

=== New York Giants ===
First official use: 1911

The early entry of this team in 1883 was simply the New Yorks, also sometimes called the Gothams, "Gotham" being a synonym for New York City. According to legend, manager Jim Mutrie was bragging to newspaper reporters about the stature of his players, "My big fellows! My giants!" and by about 1885 the name was stuck on the team for good.

"The club was first called the Giants about 1885. P.J. Donohue, New York World baseball writer, probably picked up a chance to get into a type argument with Harry Palmer of Chicago and Charles F. Mathison of Detroit. All three scribes followed teams that had big men, were proud of that fact, and stressed the poundage and height of their athletes. The New York Nationals, after playing an exhibition game with Newark in 1886, were called Giants; and when they appeared in St. Louis later the same year, Joe Pritchard, Mound City expert at that time, alluded to them as the Gotham Giants." (TSNBBG) The problem with that story is that the Giants nickname was already in use in newspapers by 1884. By 1885, it was well-established in the press. Although unofficial for a long time, it remains one of the oldest team names in MLB.

"Giants" was one of the only team nicknames used with any frequency at all in 1886 newspaper writeups, and the only team nickname, period, found in Spalding's Official Guide for 1889. However, the team's official name, as printed on its scorecards, remained simply the New York Base Ball Club. Although the "Giants" nickname was well established, it wasn't endorsed by the franchise until they put it on the home programs for the 1911 World Series; the prosaic "NEW YORK" or simple block letters "NY" were used on uniform shirts until 1918 when "GIANTS" first appeared. (Okkonen)

Eventually the alternate nickname "Jints" (rhymes with "pints") was picked up as a colloquial pronunciation of the team name. It followed them, along with their real nickname "Giants", when they moved to the west coast in 1958.

The New York Giants of the NFL were named for the baseball team which was once their landlord. Even though the baseball Giants moved in 1958, the NFL team to this day displays a sign at MetLife Stadium proudly indicating that the team's official name remains the "New York Football Giants."

=== New York Yankees ===
Modern writers tend to refer to the New York AL club as the "Highlanders" for its 1903–1912 era and as the "Yankees" from 1913 onward. The two nicknames actually developed in parallel starting around 1904, with "Highlanders" initially more often used, and "Yankees" becoming the predominant nickname before "Highlanders" was fully dropped in 1913.

Initially the team was simply the "Greater New York Baseball Club", a designation imposed on them as part of the "deal" allowing the Baltimore club to transfer to New York. Giants fans considered them to be "Invaders", and publisher William Randolph Hearst's New York Evening Journal initially referred to the new club by that name in 1903.

Both "Highlanders" and "Yankees" were also initially inventions of the press. The first president of the new New York American League entry was Joseph Gordon, who served from 1903 to 1906. There was a noted British military unit called The Gordon Highlanders. The new team built its new ballpark on a high point of Manhattan called "The Hilltop" (hence the informal nickname "Hilltop Park" for the American League Park), which contrasted especially with the altitude of the Giants, whose Polo Grounds was in the bottomland in the shadow of Coogan's Bluff. Creative members of the press, who liked to make artificial connections between disparate elements of popular culture, dubbed the team "Gordon's Highlanders" (e.g. New York World, April 15, 1903), soon shortened to just "Highlanders", and the name stuck with them for the better part of a decade.

There is no evidence that "Highlanders" was ever officially adopted by the team itself. The uniforms only sported a large block "N Y", which eventually evolved into the well-known curving NY logo of the Yankees. (Okkonen)

A prophetic letter to the editor of the New York Sun, May 7, 1903, p. 8, raised this question: "Name for the American New Yorks. If the new baseball team is to have a name that is in keeping with the 'Giants,' does it not seem reasonable that if they are the 'New York Americans' they might be called the 'Yankees' or 'Yanks'?"

The alternate nickname "Yankees" first appeared regularly in the press in 1904. The term "Yankee" or "Yank" is a synonym for "American". The new team was in the American League, and the papers for cities with two teams (such as Boston) would often call their teams "Nationals" or "Americans" to distinguish them. The term "Yankee" was also in the news frequently at that time, especially with the success of George M. Cohan's Broadway musical, Little Johnny Jones, and its centerpiece number, "Yankee Doodle Dandy". To the creative writers of the New York press, the connection was easy to make.

On April 7, 1904, a spring training story from Richmond, Virginia carried the headline "Yankees Will Start Home From South To-Day." The New York Evening Journal screamed: "YANKEES BEAT BOSTON".

The Sporting Life for a game of April 4, 1905, discussing the acquisition of Hal Chase, referred to the team as the "Americans" and the "Highlanders" in the same writeup.

As the decade progressed, the nickname "Yankees" began to be used more and more often. The New York Times writeup about Cy Young's no-hitter of June 30, 1908, referred to the club exclusively as "Yankees" or "Yanks" throughout the article, with no mention at all of "Highlanders". The Times also consistently referred to the Hilltop by its formal name, "the American League Park".

The Philadelphia Inquirer for a game of April 21, 1912, an exhibition between the two New York clubs, was headlined "Giants wallop Yanks", while in the article the teams were referred to as the "Nationals" and the "Giants"; and "the American League team", "Americans", and "Highlanders"; respectively.

The New York Times for opening day 1912 reported that "The Yankees presented a natty appearance in their new uniforms of white with black pin stripes."

In 1913, the American Leaguers left the Hilltop after ten years, and began what would become a ten-year sub-lease with the Giants at the Polo Grounds. At that point the term "Highlanders" made no logical sense, and was dropped by the press. The club was exclusively the "Yankees" from then onward.

It is uncertain exactly when the Yankees began referring to themselves by their popular nickname. By the time of Babe Ruth's arrival in 1920, the "Yankees" nickname was well established, but the name still did not appear on the uniforms. In fact, the Yankees have seldom carried their nickname on their uniforms. The only time was during 1927–1930, when the word "YANKEES" first appeared, in lieu of "NEW YORK" – on the road shirts. This was continued through the 1930 season, and then "NEW YORK" was restored to the road uniforms. (Okkonen) The name must have been considered 'official' at least by 1923, when the team named its new ballpark Yankee Stadium.

The popular and successful Yankees have acquired many other unofficial nicknames through the years, such as the "Pinstripers" for obvious reasons, and jokingly as the "Evil Empire", a term originally applied to the Soviet Union by President Ronald Reagan. Probably the longest-lasting unofficial nickname has been the "Bronx Bombers", which was applied many decades ago in reference to the Yankees' power hitting, dating back to the Ruth era. One early newspaper usage came in July 1928.

== Oakland ==
The Pacific Coast League entry was typically called the Oakland Oaks (PCL) and sometimes the Acorns as an unofficial variant.

=== Oakland A's ===
The Oakland Athletics, who began in Philadelphia and resided in Kansas City for a few years, settled on the west coast in 1968. The nickname "Athletics" is among the oldest in baseball, dating to the early 1860s. The Athletics left Oakland for West Sacramento, California in 2025, with a plan to eventually relocate to Las Vegas.

== Philadelphia ==
Aside from the enduring teams called the "Athletics" and the "Phillies", other professional teams in Philadelphia over the years included the Philadelphia White Stockings (also sometimes called the "Pearls" or even the "Phillies"), who played in the National Association in the early 1870s in direct competition with the A's; and the Keystone club of the one-year Union Association experiment in 1884.

=== Philadelphia Athletics ===
First official use: 1901

In the peak of the amateur era of baseball in the 1860s, the strongest team in the Quaker State was the Athletic Base Ball Club of Philadelphia, or just "Athletic" for short. Prior to the early 1900s, this club was typically always listed in standings as "Athletic" rather than "Philadelphia". When called the "Athletics" it was the pluralized style of the day, just as the National League entry would have been called the "Philadelphias".

As early as 1866, the Athletics uniform shirts featured the stylized letter "A" that is still used by the team's nominal descendants today. The team had turned professional by the late 1860s, and continued playing through the first year of the National League in 1876, before disbanding.

The team name "Athletic" was revived by the American Association, and again by the charter Philadelphia entry in the American League in 1901.

The AL team was originally listed in the standings in the traditional way, "Athletic", but soon evolved into the "Philadelphia Athletics". Another enduring symbol of the team soon emerged:

"In 1902, John McGraw, then manager of the New York Giants, and bitter enemy of American League president Ban Johnson, gave out an interview belittling the entry of the American League in Philadelphia, and sarcastically referred to Ben Shibe and Connie Mack's club as a 'white elephant'. A Philadelphia newspaperman labeled the Athletics the White Elephants, and they went on to win the first of many flags." (TSNBBG)

The 1905 World Series pitted the Giants against the A's, and before the first game the A's captain presented a small white elephant toy to McGraw, photos capturing one of the few times McGraw was caught grinning.

That "first of many flags" characterization, first written about 1940, was from a time when the A's were still thought of as winners or at least contenders. The team's decline, from the mid-1930s clear into the mid-1960s, would result in the franchise being transferred twice. The elephant logo first appeared on uniforms in 1918, and evolved into a circus elephant of varying colors, depending on the trim chosen for the uniform in a given year.

As the team typically wore a stylized "A" on both their home and road shirts, and eventually on their caps, the nickname "A's" also arose. The first break with the "A" tradition came in 1920, when the team featured the elephant logo on shirts for the first time, displacing the "A", albeit in a dark blue. The elephant, worn as a badge of defiance following McGraw's remarks, had previously appeared on just the warmup weathers and then on the uniform sleeve. The elephant was changed to its titular white in 1924, and in 1928 the team went back to the traditional "A". (Okkonen)

After owner Charles O. Finley moved the team to Oakland in 1968, he dropped "Athletics" and made "A's" the official team name. "Athletics" was restored in 1981.

=== Philadelphia Phillies ===
"They've been the Phillies ever since the team entered the National League in 1883." (TSNBBG).

"Phillies" or "Phils" is a short form of "Philadelphias", in the style of the 19th century, when a city would be referred to by writers that way. The city itself is often called "Philly" for short. Other uses of that term include the Philly Cheesesteak and the popular Phillies Blunt cigar. "Phillies'" earliest appearance in the Spalding Guide was in 1894, in the context of "Bostons," "Chicagos" etc.

Bob Carpenter acquired the Phillies in the late fall of 1943. The following spring, a new name, "Blue Jays", was selected in a fans' contest. (TSNBBG) This change never caught on with the general public, especially as the uniform shirts continued to say "Phillies", albeit with a blue jay shoulder patch. That experiment was dropped after a couple of years.

In 1900, the team's road shirts said "PHILA", a common abbreviation of "Philadelphia". The Phillies' uniforms otherwise carried only a simple block or stylized letter "P" for several decades. The first time the word "Phillies" appeared was 1933, in a script-style that has appeared frequently in the decades since then. In 1942, the word "Phils" appeared on the road shirts and the block letter "P" re-appeared on the home shirts, just for the one season. The script "Phillies" continued until 1970 when, in anticipation of the move to Veterans Stadium, the team returned to a stylized letter "P" on their shirts. In 1992, the script "Phillies" was restored to the shirts. (Okkonen)

== Phoenix ==
Prior to its entrance to the Major Leagues, Phoenix used several different nicknames for its ball clubs. They were first known as the Phoenix Senators, then the Phoenix Giants after their big league affiliate, and lastly the Phoenix Firebirds, for the mythologic bird synonymous with the city's name.

=== Arizona Diamondbacks ===
A Diamondback, specifically Crotalus atrox, is a rattlesnake which is a very common sight in the Arizona desert and a fearsome symbol. The club adopted the symbol upon its formation in 1998. A baseball field is also called a "diamond". The team is often called the "D-backs" for short, and as of 2007, the team was wearing shirts that read "D-backs". On the left sleeve is a stylized "db" which forms the head of a snake. The team is also sometimes called the "Snakes".

== Pittsburgh ==
=== Pittsburgh Pirates ===
The original Pittsburgh club, formed in 1882, was in the then-separate city of Allegheny, Pennsylvania, across the Allegheny River northwest of downtown Pittsburgh. Thus the club was called "Allegheny" in the standings, and in the style of the day, the "Alleghenys" (note that it was not "Alleghenies"). The Alleghenys played in the American Association during 1882–1886, then transferred to the National League in 1887. However, out-of-town newspapers tended to list the team as "Pittsburg" (as it was often spelled at the time) rather than "Allegheny." The club wore "Pittsburgh" (variously spelled with or without the final h) on its uniforms by 1890, although Allegheny remained a separate city until it was annexed by Pittsburgh in 1907.

The club was accused of "pirating" Lou Bierbauer in the Players' League settlement following the 1890 season, which led to their nickname. This fact is a detail of the larger story of what was happening in professional baseball around that time.

In 1888, baseball owners established rules to categorize players and pay them according to rank. Since the owners set the categories themselves, their new system at first lowered, and then eventually froze players salaries. Shortly before this, in 1885, John Montgomery Ward, a current Major League pitcher and Columbia Law School graduate, had founded the "Brotherhood of Base Ball Players" an association to protect and promote players interests. Baseball owners had instituted their new rules in the off-season without talking with the players, and this led to a rift between them and the players. Despite yearlong efforts to negotiate with the owners over these new restrictions on players, Ward could not get them to bargain or even recognize the Brotherhood. Players revolted and in 1890 they started a new league called the Players' League. The Players' League was spearheaded by Ward, who not only gained financial backers, but he also solicited star players to jump from the National League and American Association to the new league.

With three professional leagues competing, many in the same cities, there was not enough revenue to go around, and each league lost money. Although the Players' League's attendance was the best of the three leagues, it folded after one year. The financially hemorrhaging American Association folded one year later, and the National League absorbed four of its teams.

In 1890, Philadelphia Athletics players Lou Bierbauer and Harry Stovey had jumped to the Players' League. After the Players' League collapsed, through a clerical error the Athletics had failed to reserve Bierbauer's and Stovey's services. Pittsburgh signed Bierbauer and Stovey to contracts. The Athletics protested losing these players, and this led to an impartial Arbitration Board, which included American Association President Allen W. Thurman. The board ruled in Pittsburgh's favor. Despite the ruling, the Athletics still grumbled at the decision, and ridiculed their cross-state rivals by calling them "Pirates" for "stealing" their players. The "Pirates" tag stuck and the alliterative name was eventually adopted as Pittsburgh's official team nickname. The Spalding Guide was using "Pirates" occasionally by its 1894 edition. By the time of the 1903 World Series, the team (officially the Pittsburgh Athletic Company) was commonly known as "Pirates", and represented in cartoons by a pirate figure, although the club did not acknowledge it on their uniforms until 1912.

Alternate nicknames such as "Bucs" or "Buccos", short for "buccaneer", have been used through the years. "Buccaneer" is typically used synonymously with "pirate", although historically "buccaneer" is a more specific term for pirates who operated in the Caribbean, especially along the Spanish Main coast.

"No Smoky City club ever had a nickname until 1890. Then the team, which lost 113 games while winning only 23, was tagged the Innocents — apparently being innocent of victorious aspirations. In 1890, during the off-season, Pittsburgh owners signed second baseman Louis Bierbauer, whom the bankrupt Athletic club of Philadelphia had forgotten to reserve. The Pittsburgh club became known as the Pirates, in reference to so-called "pirating" of players." (TSNBBG)

The Pittsburgh Steelers of the NFL began as the Pittsburgh Pirates, in reference to the baseball team from which they rented Forbes Field in their early years. There was also a short-lived NHL entry from 1925 to 1930 called the Pittsburgh Pirates.

== St. Louis ==
In the National Association of 1875, St. Louis fielded two entries, called the St. Louis Brown Stockings (or Browns); and the St. Louis Red Stockings, (or Reds). The Reds did not survive the season. The Browns were better organized and were carried forward into the new National League in 1876. The club abandoned League ball after the 1877 season due to a betting scandal, but continued to play as an independent semipro team.

The St. Louis Maroons of the Union Association in 1884, and the NL in 1885–1886, continued the reddish color scheme during their brief tenure. For the 1886 season they wore uniforms sporting a large black diamond shape on the chest, and some reporters referred to them as the "Black Diamonds" that year. In 1887 they decamped for Indianapolis, where they played three losing seasons before folding.

The St. Louis Terriers of the Federal League of 1914–1915 were the only major league club in St. Louis that eschewed being named for a color.

=== St. Louis Cardinals ===
The old Browns were bought by St. Louis grocery magnate Chris von der Ahe in 1882 and became a charter member of the American Association. The team continued with brown stockings and trim, and was one of the most successful in the AA's ten-year existence under the leadership of 1st baseman/captain Charles Comiskey, and was carried forward into the NL in 1892. In 1893 their jerseys were blazoned "St. Louis Browns" (in white, on navy blue uniforms; only their belts and socks were brown).

In 1899, the club decided it was time for a makeover. They rebuilt the stands at Robison Field after a fire; they stripped the Cleveland Spiders of their star players, hoping to take a major leap in the standings; and, according to most sources, changed their uniform color that year, from brown to red. The refreshed team was labeled the Perfectos by a perhaps over-optimistic press. The team jumped from twelfth to fifth, rather short of its lofty goal.

The team was also being called Cardinals by season's end. According to TSNBBG, it was William McHale, baseball writer for the St. Louis Republic, who dubbed the red-trimmed team the St. Louis Cardinals. By 1900, that name was in universal usage, and they have been known by that nickname to this day.

The term "Cardinal" for both the bird and the color originated from the traditional vestments of the Cardinals of the Roman Catholic Church.

The red-trimmed uniforms at first were only labeled "ST. LOUIS", on both home and road shirts, later replaced by the familiar interlocking "StL" logo. The word "Cardinals" first appeared on both home and road shirts in 1918. The term went from just being a color to also being a symbol in 1922, with the first incarnation of the two cardinal birds perched on a bat across the word "Cardinals". (Okkonen)

The synonym "Redbirds" and the abbreviation "Cards" are also in broad usage today.

The St. Louis Cardinals of the NFL transferred from Chicago to St. Louis in 1960, and from St. Louis to Phoenix in 1988. The Football Cardinals were not named after the Baseball Cardinals, but for the same reason that the Baseball Cardinals acquired their name — from the color of their jerseys, which were originally hand-me-downs from the University of Chicago Maroons.

=== St. Louis Browns ===
The nickname St. Louis Browns was revived in 1902 by the AL entry that transferred from Milwaukee. Moving from one major brewing city to another, they could have retained the nickname "Brewers", but for marketing reasons they chose to adopt the recently abandoned colors of their established rival.

The Browns were the better team in the Mound City for the first 25 years or so of their co-existence, but the Cardinals returned to winning form in the mid-1920s and the Browns struggled after that. The club was looking for a city to transfer to in the early 1950s. They considered coincidentally returning to their roots in Milwaukee, but the Braves beat them to it. They settled for a move to Baltimore in 1954, where they were renamed the "Orioles", ending the life of the "Browns" nickname.

Although known from the beginning as the "Browns", and wearing brown trim most of the time (except for 1906 when they experimented with all-black trim), the club did not wear the word "BROWNS" on their shirts until 1934. (Okkonen) The team had various logos. In the early years they had an interlaced "StL", as with the Cardinals. In the 1930s, they began wearing a patch featuring an illustration of the famous statue of the royal Saint. In 1952, they began wearing a sleeve patch with a cartoon face of a "Brownie".

The Cleveland Browns of the NFL have no connection to the St. Louis Browns, although their color scheme (orange and brown) and their use of a "Brownie" coincide.

== San Diego ==
=== San Diego Padres ===
The minor league team called the San Diego Padres of the Pacific Coast League operated during 1936–1968. The name Padre was taken from the Spanish word for "Father", a term of respect used for Spanish missionaries; San Diego was founded as a mission by Franciscan friars. When Major League Baseball expanded to San Diego in 1969, the old nickname was retained for the new team.

The team is frequently called the "Pads" or "Pods" in the media, which rhymes with the first syllable of "PAHD-rays". "Friars" has also been a longtime team nickname.

== San Francisco ==
The San Francisco Seals operated from the inception of the Pacific Coast League in 1903 through 1957. The name "Seals" was revived by a professional hockey team in 1961 which eventually became the California Golden Seals before departing the Bay Area.

A second, shorter-lived club was the Mission Reds, who played in San Francisco during 1925–1937. They were sometimes called the "Missions".

=== San Francisco Giants ===
After the 1957 season, the San Francisco Seals (Joe DiMaggio's former team), relocated to Phoenix, Arizona, to accommodate the arrival of the New York Giants, who moved from the east coast alongside the Dodgers. Following the relocation, the San Francisco Giants maintained a competitive tradition, with prominent players like Willie Mays, Willie McCovey and Barry Bonds, all of whom achieved an MVP or similar levels of production, continuing the legacy of prominent stars by Mays and Mel Ott during the team's tenure in New York.

== Seattle ==
The original Pacific Coast League minor league club in Seattle was initially called the Indians, due to the Native American legacy of the area. The team was later named the Seattle Rainiers, directly in reference to the Rainier Brewing Company, and indirectly in reference to Mount Rainier, for which the brewery was named. The Rainiers operated through 1968, when the major leagues expanded. After the one-year major league experiment, a new Rainiers ball club was formed and played during 1972–1976, when the majors were ready to try Seattle again. Since 1995, the Rainiers name has been used by the Seattle Mariners' Triple-A affiliate in nearby Tacoma.

=== Seattle Pilots ===
The AL expansion team in 1969 was named in reference to the prominence of marine activities in the Puget Sound area, primarily after ship pilots who guide large ships into the ports of Puget Sound. The caps even featured the "scrambled eggs" golden-leaf symbol of a ship's captain. The ambitious but underfunded club sank in a sea of red ink, and became the first major league club since the 1901 Milwaukee Brewers to switch cities after one year. Ironically, the Pilots moved to Milwaukee, and became the new Milwaukee Brewers.

=== Seattle Mariners ===
The AL again expanded to Seattle, in 1977, with the formation of the Seattle Mariners. The nickname again alluded to fishing and other marine activities. The Mariners have been in Seattle for over 40 years with no indications of leaving anytime soon.

== Tampa Bay Area ==
Several minor league teams played in the Tampa Bay area prior to the introduction of the American League ball club in 1998. Named after the local cigar industry, the Tampa Smokers existed in several leagues from 1919 until 1954. Also bearing the Tampa city name were the Tampa Tarpons who existed from 1957 until 1988, and were named after the Atlantic-native fish. The St. Petersburg Saints, who were named as such because of their city name, played mostly in the Florida State League from 1920 until 1928 and again from 1947 until 2000.

Other teams still exist in the area including a new iteration of the Tampa Tarpons and the Dunedin Blue Jays (named after their MLB affiliate), the Clearwater Threshers (after the thresher shark), the Bradenton Marauders (a nod to their MLB affiliate, the Pittsburgh Pirates), and the Lakeland Flying Tigers, who similarly named as a nod to their MLB affiliate, the Detroit Tigers.

=== Tampa Bay Devil Rays/Rays ===
The club was an expansion franchise in the American League in 1998. The team's logo included an illustration of a manta ray, also called a devilfish or devil ray. The team was also called the D-rays or the Rays for short. As of 2007, one version of their home uniforms said "Rays", and no version said "Devil Rays", although a patch illustrating a manta ray was used. On November 8, 2007, the club announced that they were dropping the "Devil" part in order to identify themselves primarily with the rays of the sun, Florida being the Sunshine State, and their redesigned logo reflects that theme. As noted in the MLB article the club stated that they would continue using the manta ray patch as an acknowledgment of their previous identity – a feature easily visible on their uniforms in the super-closeups used by television in the 2008 World Series, as the former league doormats turned into the American League's champion team in 2008. The club would also retain its furry mascot, called "Raymond", strictly for humorous reasons, as that name has no etymological connection to either the old or the new usage of "ray".

== Toronto ==
The original minor league club in Toronto was the Toronto Maple Leafs, which operated from 1896 through 1967 in the International League.

The National Hockey League club renamed itself the Toronto Maple Leafs in 1927 and has been known by that name ever since.

=== Toronto Blue Jays ===
By the time the American League expanded to Toronto in 1977, the NHL club's strong identification as the Maple Leafs precluded any chance of reviving that name for the baseball team.

The Toronto franchise was originally owned by Labatt Breweries, with Imperial Trust and the Canadian Imperial Bank of Commerce as minority owners. The name "Blue Jays" came about in 1976, when the team held a "name the team" contest, which involved more than 4,000 suggestions. 154 people suggested the name "Blue Jays" and Dr. William Mills, a periodontist from Etobicoke, was selected from a draw as the grand winner. Mills stated that it was traditional for a Toronto-based sports team to have the colour blue as its primary colour and following the leads of the Baltimore Orioles and St. Louis Cardinals that the team be named after a bird.

Although the team was officially named via the contest, another theory was that "Blue Jays" was chosen by majority owner Labatt Breweries—an apparent tie-in with its feature brand, Labatt Blue. (Labatt's sponsored broadcasts of the games, providing an on-air opportunity for TV commentators to take a microscopic pause when saying "You're watching Labatt's Blue...Jays baseball on CBC.") Many others have taken unofficial credit for the name: former Ontario Premier John Robarts, a member of the team's board of directors, claimed the name came to him as "I was shaving this morning and I saw a blue jay out my window."

Coincidentally, the nickname "Blue Jays" was used briefly by the Philadelphia Phillies (the team that Toronto beat in the 1993 World Series), from 1944 to 1945.

The short form "Jays" has been used extensively for much of the team's history.

== Washington, D.C. ==
Baseball clubs in Washington, D.C. have been known by a variety of nicknames since the first professional teams appeared in 1870. One team was called the "Olympics", another was called the "Nationals". Both of those names persisted through the 1870s. Later teams in the 19th Century were called the "Nationals" and also obvious other Capital City nicknames such as "Statesmen" and "Senators". By the 1890s, "Senators" was commonly used in the media for the National League entry, and it appears in the 1894 Spalding Guide.

=== Washington Nationals/Senators ===
The "Senators" nickname carried over to the new American League entry in 1901. The team was generally called the Senators from 1901 to 1904, as the old National League club had been. Washington Star newspaper owner Thomas C. Noyes, along with an ownership group of Benjamin Minor, Harry Rapley and others bought the team in 1905.

Before the 1905 season, Noyes solicited fans and writers for a new nickname. In an effort to remarket the team Noyes decided to officially name the club the "Nationals", reverting to the older nickname.

"The new owners desire to get as far away as possible from the old regime and start the coming season without any barnacles to hinder its move toward prosperity. With that end in view it is proposed to bury the moss-covered title of Senators and secure a nickname that may be lucky and popular." – Tom Noyes, 1905

During 1905 and 1906, the team wore "Nationals" on their new shirts, the first team to wear a full team name. Otherwise, the shirts either read "Washington" or carried a plain block "W". (Okkonen)

"Fans, by ballot, decided their club was to be called the Nationals, instead of the Senators. The only trouble with the vote was that its result was not binding on headline writers. Therefore, the Washington club still is often called Senators, as well as the Nats and Griffs, the latter nickname being derived from the name of owner Clark Calvin Griffith." (TSNBBG)

Some reluctance could have been due to the inherent ambiguity of the name. Writers frequently referred to individual major league teams as "Americans" or "Nationals" in reference to their league affiliation—and the Washington Nationals were in the American League.

Newspaper articles for decades used the names "Senators" and "Nationals" (or "Nats") interchangeably, often within the same article. Baseball guides even said "Nationals or Senators" when listing the nickname. This was long before teams made nicknames registered trademarks for marketing purposes.

Thus the Washington ballclub was known by two nicknames for most of its history prior to moving to Minnesota. Although there have been other teams with dual nicknames, such as the Brooklyn "Robins"/"Dodgers", or the New York "Highlanders"/"Yankees", the longevity of this dual nickname was unique.

The nickname "Senators" was kept alive especially by out-of-town writers. World Series programs in the same year referred to the team by different names: In 1933, the programs for the games played in New York City advertised "Giants vs. Senators", while programs for the games played in Washington included a photo of Washington manager Joe Cronin with the caption "Nationals' Manager".

Although "Nationals" or "Nats" was still used on baseball cards issued by Topps as late as 1956, by the 1950s, the name "Nationals" was pretty much passé. For example, the popular 1955 Broadway musical Damn Yankees referred to the club primarily, if not exclusively, as the "Senators".

Following the 1956 season, owner Calvin Griffith decided to officially change the name to Senators, but it wasn't until 1959 that the word "Senators" finally appeared on their shirts. (Okkonen) They and their expansion-replacement in 1961 would remain officially the "Senators" for good, although space-saving headline writers continued to refer to them as "Nats" frequently.

=== Washington Nationals ===
The Washington Nationals of the National League, transplanted from the Montreal Expos in 2005, revived the old Nationals name, and with modern marketing techniques it appears the name will stick this time. The time-honored headline abbreviation "Nats" has also been revived. Any possibility of using the name "Washington Senators" was prohibited by the Texas Rangers still owning the rights to that trademark. Although there was some sentiment to revive the name Senators, political considerations factored into the choice of Nationals, a revival of the first American League franchise's "official" nickname used from 1905 to 1956. Politicians and others in the District of Columbia objected to the name Senators because the District of Columbia does not have voting representation in Congress. Although the Rangers still owned the rights to the Senators name, the Nationals were able to acquire the rights to the curly "W" from the Rangers.

== First official adoption of team names (classic 16) ==
National League
City	Name	Date and source
Boston	Braves Bees	1912 (uniform logo); 1915 (uniform name); 1936–1940 (newspaper poll)
Brooklyn	Dodgers	1916 (World Series programs); 1932 (uniform)
Chicago	Cubs	1907 (scorecards); 1908 (uniform logo); 1909 (uniform name)
Cincinnati	Reds; Redlegs	1911 (uniform name); 1953–1960 (owner declaration)
New York	Giants	1911 (World Series programs); 1918 (uniform name)
Philadelphia	Phillies	1890; 1933 (uniform name)
Pittsburgh	Pirates	1912 (uniform name)
St Louis	Browns; Cardinals	1893 (uniform name); 1918 (uniform name)
American League
City	Name	Date and source
Boston	Red Sox	1908 (uniform logo); 1912 (uniform name)
Chicago	White Stockings; White Sox	1906 (programs); 1912 (uniform name)
Cleveland	Napoleons; Indians	1903 (newspaper contest); 1915 (newspaper contest); 1927 (uniform logo); 1946 (uniform name)
Detroit	Tigers	1901 (cap logo); 1927 (uniform logo); 1928 (uniform name)
Baltimore; New York	Orioles; Yankees	1901 (uniform initial); 1923 (stadium name); 1927 (uniform name)
Philadelphia	Athletics	1901 (uniform initial); 1909 (baseball card); 1927 (uniform name)
St Louis	Browns	1934 (uniform name)
Washington	Nationals; Senators	1905 (uniform name); 1957 (owner declaration)

== General references ==
- The Sporting News Baseball Guides through the years, especially during the 1940s when a history of each team's nickname was included. Reference as (TSNBBG) in this article.
- Baseball Uniforms of the 20th Century: The Official Major League Baseball Guide, by Marc Okkonen, 1991, Sterling Publishing, Co. Referenced as (Okkonen) in this article.

These books about baseball parks also contain a lot of information about the minor league teams:

- Green Cathedrals, Philip J. Lowry, 1986, SABR, with revised editions in later years.
- Ballparks of North America, Michael Benson, 1989, McFarland.

Reference books specific to one team's history are embedded.
