= Chronic Offender =

1981 science fiction story by Spider Robinson

"Chronic Offender" is a science fiction short story by Spider Robinson. It was written as an homage to Damon Runyon, to whom it is dedicated. The style echoes Runyon's, especially in its use of present and future tenses only throughout. It was first published in 1981 in Rod Serling's The Twilight Zone Magazine.

== Plot ==
A former small time criminal in Manhattan, now an old man living in 1980 in a low-rent apartment, finds a "ghost" burgling his home. The man is "Harry the Horse", a ruthless thug and general criminal who died decades before. Harry recognizes his old friend, declares that he will not "guzzle his joint" (i.e. not rob his home) and tells him how he got there.

Back in 1930 during the Depression, Harry and his two cronies were caught passing counterfeit bills and bailed out by "Judge" Goldfobber, a shady lawyer. Goldfobber told them to pay him back by "chilling" a man up in Harlem and taking a box the size of a phone box from his apartment to Goldfobber's Long Island home. The box turned out to be a time machine built by a stereotypical crazy old professor, Doc Twitchell, who went to Goldfobber to patent it. Harry saw the opportunity to make money by getting stock or horse racing tips from the future, so he killed the inventor and also his two cronies, before using the machine to send himself 50 years into the future, a time when he thinks the Depression should be over.

In the future he finds himself in a derelict building with no power, so the time machine will not function to send him back. Worse, Harlem is not the vibrant multi-ethnic neighborhood he knew and he barely escapes despite being having his trusty "roscoe" (gun). He eventually robs and hijacks his way to the narrator's neighborhood and breaks into his apartment to steal cash. He needs to steal the racing results, which are now on microfilm, and a machine to read them with, from the library.

The two set about getting the time machine working again. The narrator has a friend, "Socket" Twomey, who dabbles in selling marijuana but is also an electrician. They go up to Harlem where Socket routes some wires to restore power, knowing that the city will take days to notice. Socket and Harry steal the microfilm and the reader, and Socket figures out how to work the time machine to avoid it arriving at the wrong time and causing a "pair o'ducks". Harry insists that somebody else has the first try, so the narrator himself goes back to the old days and spends a glorious few hours in the city he remembers. Harry leaves for the past, promising to leave his friends half of his first million dollars at the First National Bank after becoming rich. The narrator tells Socket this will not happen, and Socket replies he knows it, because he removed the light bulb from the microfilm reader to get back at Harry for threatening him. The narrator knows another reason: while he was back in 1930 he made a phone call to Goldfobber telling him that Harry was double-crossing him. He remembers being at the courthouse when a real judge gave Goldfobber the "hot squat", i.e. the electric chair, on account of "his personal revolver matches up with the six slugs they dig out of Harry the Horse".

== Reception ==
The SF Site considered the story to be one of "the most memorable" in Robinson's 2005 collection By Any Other Name, while CM: A Reviewing Journal of Canadian Materials for Young People declared it to be "(t)he best piece of writing in [Robinson's 1984 collection Melancholy Elephants]".
