= Charles F. Mathison =

American sports journalist (1856–1933)

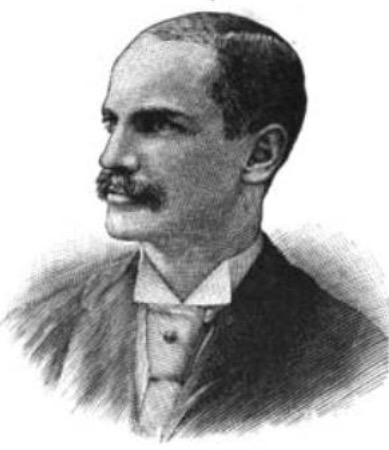
- Born: July 27, 1856; Detroit, Michigan, US
- Died: June 22, 1933 (aged 76); New York City, US
- Occupation: Sports journalist

Charles F. Mathison (July 27, 1856 – June 22, 1933) was an American sports journalist. He was a baseball writer for the Detroit Free Press and later a boxing writer for The Ring.

== Biography ==
Mathison was born on July 27, 1856, in Detroit, to a well-off family. He was educated at local common schools. He played baseball as a child, and considered pursuing the sport professionally, but instead joined the staff of the Detroit Free Press. At first a typesetter, he eventually became a proofreader, and by 1881, a wire editor. In 1886, he became the scorer of the Detroit Club and the Detroit correspondent for the Sporting Life. He primarily wrote about baseball and was often critical of the sport.

At some point after the 1880s, Mathison moved to New York City. There, he worked for The Morning Telegraph, the The New York Globe, The New York Herald, the New York Press, and The Sun. He left the Herald, after which he became the associate editor of The Ring, a position he held for the remainder of his life.

Mathison became a leading boxing writer in the United States. He served as a judge in championship matches. He was one of few to witness every bare-knuckle boxing match of John L. Sullivan.

Mathison lived in Coney Island. He was married, his wife dying c. 1932. He died there on June 22, 1933, aged 76, from cardiovascular disease.
