= Wire editor =

News Stories

A wire editor (also known as telegraph editor) selects and edits news stories. Editing includes checking for spelling and punctuation, relevance of information, selection of content, space allocated to stories, and rewriting.

== Sources ==
Dictionary of Occupational Titles: Definitions of titles. Vol. 1 (Third ed.). U.S. Department of Labor, Manpower Administration, Bureau of Employment Security. 1965. This article incorporates public domain material from websites or documents of the United States Department of Labor.
