= Damon Runyon =

American writer (1880–1946)

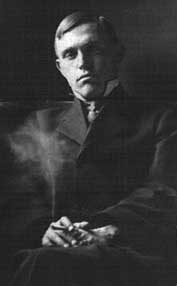
- Born: Alfred Damon Runyan; October 4, 1880; Manhattan, Kansas, U.S.
- Died: December 10, 1946 (aged 66); New York City, U.S.
- Occupations: Writer, journalist
- Years active: 1900–1946

Alfred Damon Runyon (October 4, 1880 – December 10, 1946) was an American journalist and short-story writer.

== Overview ==
Runyon was best known for his short stories celebrating the world of Broadway in New York City that grew out of the Prohibition era. To New Yorkers of his generation, a "Damon Runyon character" evoked a distinctive social type from Brooklyn or Midtown Manhattan. Runyonesque refers to this type of character and the type of situations and dialog that Runyon depicts. He spun humorous and sentimental tales of gamblers, hustlers, actors, and gangsters, invariably given colorful monikers such as "Nathan Detroit", "Benny Southstreet", "Big Jule", "Harry the Horse", "Good Time Charley", "Dave the Dude", or "The Seldom Seen Kid".

His distinctive vernacular style is known as Runyonese: a mixture of formal speech and colorful slang, almost always in the present tense, and always devoid of contractions. He is credited with coining the phrase "Hooray Henry", a term now used in British English to describe the upper-class version of a loud-mouthed, arrogant twit.

Runyon's fictional world is also known to the general public through the musical Guys and Dolls based on the Runyon stories "The Idyll of Miss Sarah Brown" and "Blood Pressure". The musical also borrows characters and story elements from a few other Runyon stories, notably "Pick the Winner". The film Little Miss Marker (and its three remakes, Sorrowful Jones, 40 Pounds of Trouble and the 1980 Little Miss Marker) grew from his short story of the same name.

Runyon was also a newspaper reporter, covering sports and general news for decades for various publications and syndicates owned by William Randolph Hearst. Already known for his fiction, he wrote a noted "present tense" article on Franklin Delano Roosevelt's Presidential inauguration in 1933 for the Universal Service, a Hearst syndicate, which was merged with the co-owned International News Service in 1937.

== Early life ==
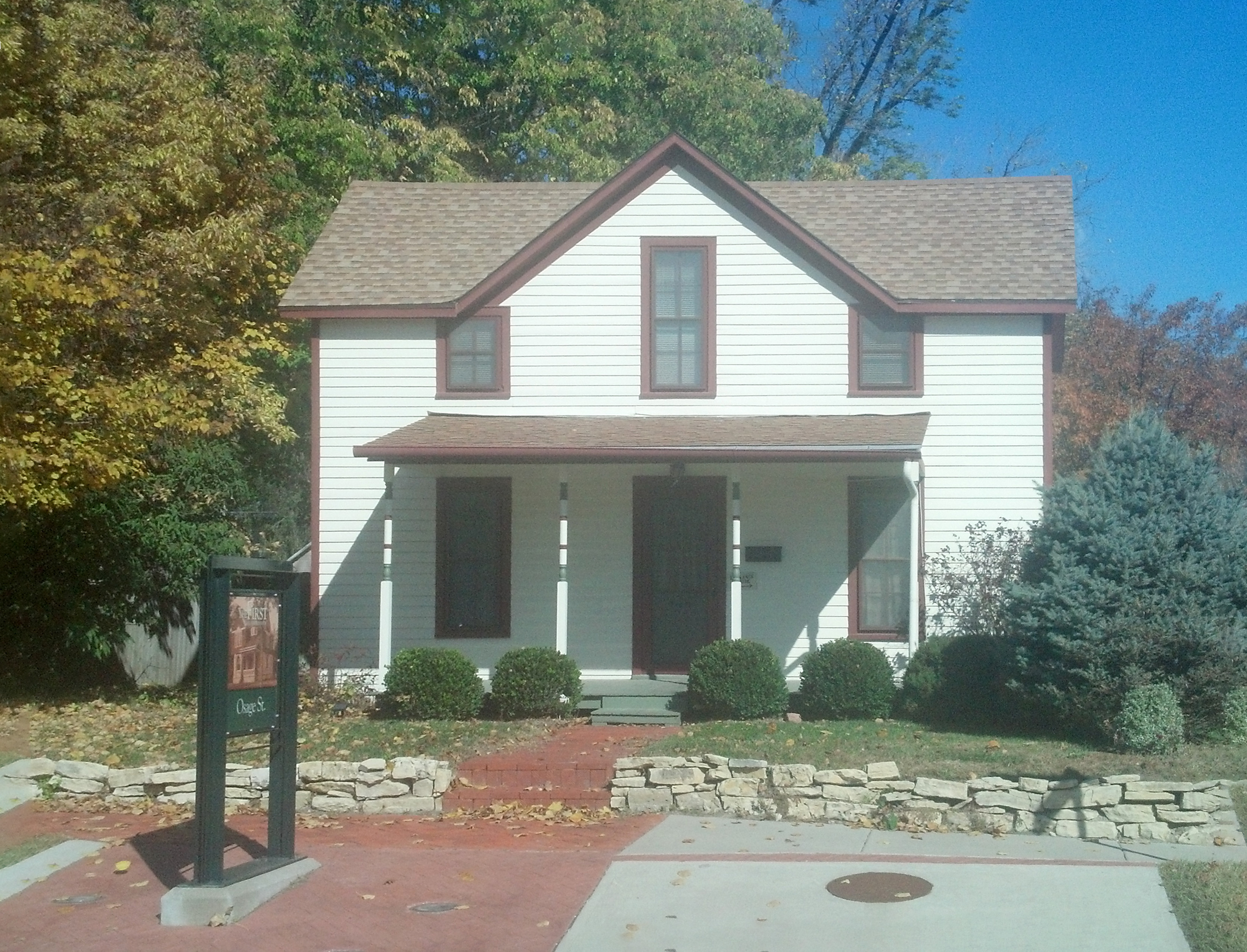
Boyhood home of Damon Runyon in Manhattan, Kansas

Damon Runyon was born Alfred Damon Runyan to Alfred Lee and Elizabeth (Damon) Runyan. His relatives in his birthplace of Manhattan, Kansas, included several newspapermen. His grandfather was a newspaper printer from New Jersey who had relocated to Manhattan, Kansas, in 1855, and his father was the editor of his newspaper in the town. In 1882 Runyon's father was forced to sell his newspaper, and the family moved westward. The family eventually settled in Pueblo, Colorado, in 1887, where Runyon spent the rest of his youth as portrayed in the film "Damon Runyon's Pueblo." By most accounts, he attended school only through the fourth grade. He began to work in the newspaper trade under his father in Pueblo. In present-day Pueblo, Runyon Field, the Damon Runyon Repertory Theater Company, and Runyon Lake are named in his honor.

== Military service ==
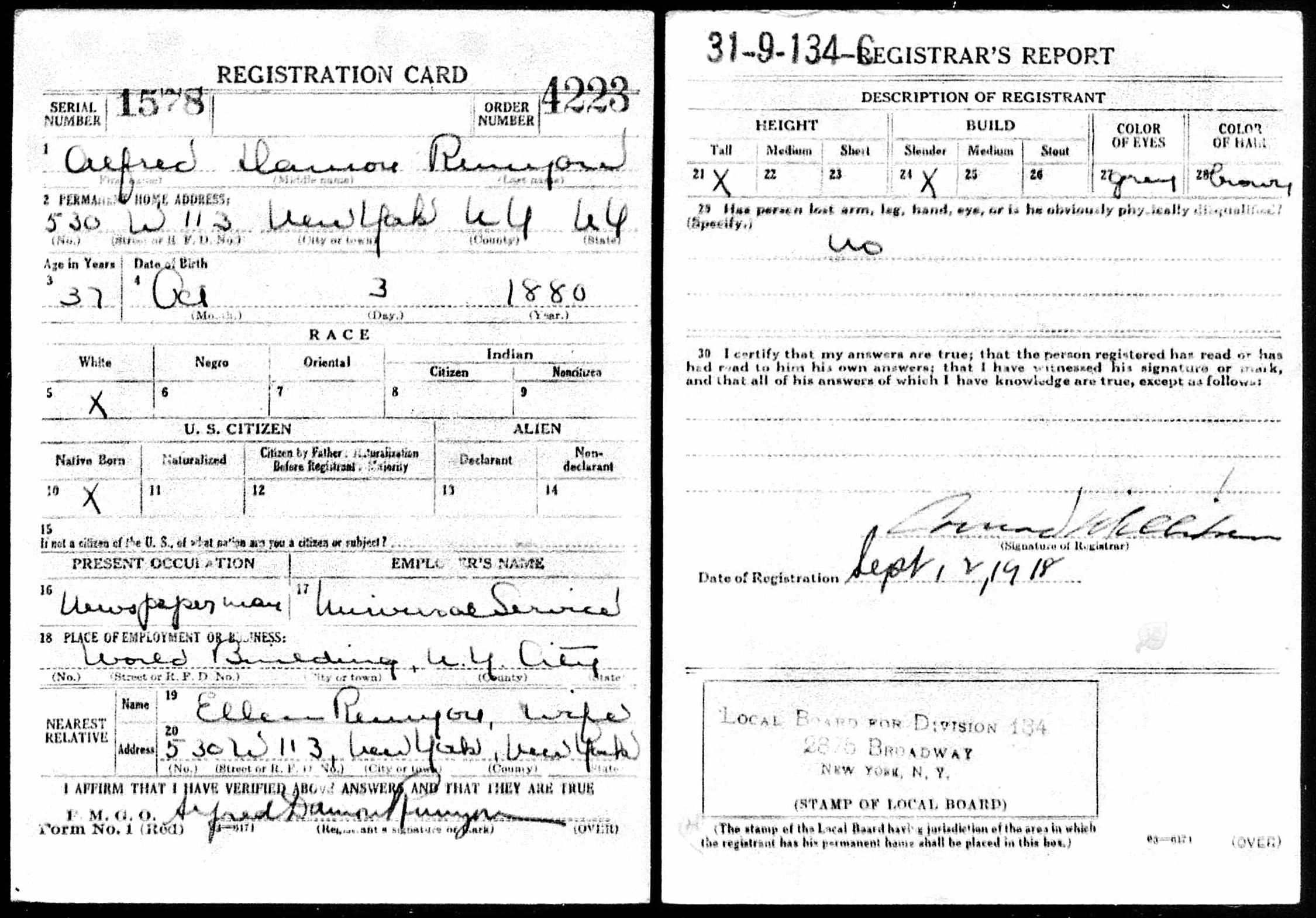
Runyon's World War I draft registration (September 1918)

In 1898, when still in his teens, Runyon enlisted in the US Army to fight in the Spanish–American War. While in the service, he was assigned to write for the Manila Freedom and Soldier's Letter.

== Newspaper reporter ==
After military service, he worked for Colorado newspapers, beginning in Pueblo. His first job as a reporter was in September 1900, when he was hired by the Pueblo Star; he then worked in the Rocky Mountain area during the first decade of the 1900s: at the Denver Daily News, he served as "sporting editor" (today a "sports editor") and then as a staff writer. His expertise was in covering the semi-professional teams in Colorado. He briefly managed a semi-pro team in Trinidad, Colorado. At one of the newspapers where he worked, the spelling of his last name was changed from "Runyan" to "Runyon", a change he let stand.

After failing in an attempt to organize a Colorado minor baseball league, which lasted less than a week, Runyon moved to New York City in 1910. In his first New York byline, the American editor dropped the "Alfred" and the name "Damon Runyon" appeared for the first time. For the next ten years, he covered the New York Giants and professional boxing for the New York American.

He was the Hearst newspapers' baseball columnist for many years, beginning in 1911, and his knack for spotting the eccentric and the unusual, on the field or in the stands, is credited with revolutionizing the way baseball was covered. Perhaps as confirmation, Runyon was voted 1967 J. G. Taylor Spink Award by the Baseball Writers' Association of America (BBWAA), for which he was honored at ceremonies at the National Baseball Hall of Fame in July 1968. He is also a member of the International Boxing Hall Of Fame and is known for dubbing heavyweight champion James J. Braddock the "Cinderella Man". Runyon frequently contributed sports poems to the American on boxing and baseball themes and wrote numerous short stories and essays.

If I have all the tears that are shed on Broadway by guys in love, I will have enough salt water to start an opposition ocean to the Atlantic and Pacific, with enough left over to run the Great Salt Lake out of business. But I wish to say I never shed any of these tears personally, because I am never in love, and furthermore, barring a bad break, I never expect to be in love, for the way I look at it love is strictly the old phedinkus, and I tell the little guy as much.

— from "Tobias the Terrible",
collected in More than Somewhat (1937)

== Gambling ==
Gambling, particularly on craps or horse races, was a common theme of Runyon's works, and he was a notorious gambler. One of his paraphrases from a line in Ecclesiastes ran: "The race is not always to the swift, nor the battle to the strong, but that's how the smart money bets."

A heavy drinker as a young man, he seems to have quit drinking soon after arriving in New York, after his drinking nearly cost him the courtship of the woman who became his first wife, Ellen Egan. He remained a heavy smoker.

His best friend was mobster accountant Otto Berman, and he incorporated Berman into several of his stories under the alias "Regret, the horse player". When Berman was killed in a hit on Berman's boss, Dutch Schultz, Runyon quickly assumed the role of damage control for his deceased friend, mostly by correcting erroneous press releases, including one that stated Berman was one of Schultz's gunmen, to which Runyon replied, "Otto would have been as effective a bodyguard as a two-year-old."

== Personal life ==
While in New York City, Runyon courted and eventually married Ellen Egan. Their marriage produced two children, Mary and Damon Jr. A modern writer remarks that "by contemporary standards, Runyon was a marginal husband and father." In 1928, Egan separated from Runyon permanently and moved to Bronxville with their children after hearing persistent rumors about her husband's infidelities. As it became subsequently known, Runyon, in 1916, was covering the border raids of Mexican bandit Pancho Villa as a reporter for the American newspaper owned by William Randolph Hearst. He had first met Villa in Texas while covering spring training of the state's teams.

While in Mexico, Runyon visited one afternoon the Ciudad Juárez racetrack where Villa was present and placed a bet through a young messenger girl in Villa's entourage. The 14-year-old girl, whose name was Patrice Amati del Grande, erroneously placed Runyon's bet on a different horse that nonetheless won the race. She confided to the lucky bettor that she wanted to be a dancer when she grew up and Runyon told her that if, instead, she would attend school, for which he would pay, she could come after her graduation to see him in New York and he would get her a dancing job in the city; Runyon did indeed pay for her enrollment in the local convent school.

In 1925, 19-year-old Grande came to New York City looking for Runyon and found him through the American's receptionist. The two became lovers and he found her work at local speakeasies. In 1928, after the separation between Runyon and Ellen Egan turned into a divorce, Runyon and Grande were married by his friend, city mayor Jimmy Walker. His former wife became an alcoholic and died in 1931 from a heart attack. In 1946, some time after Grande began an affair with a younger man, the couple got divorced.

== Death ==
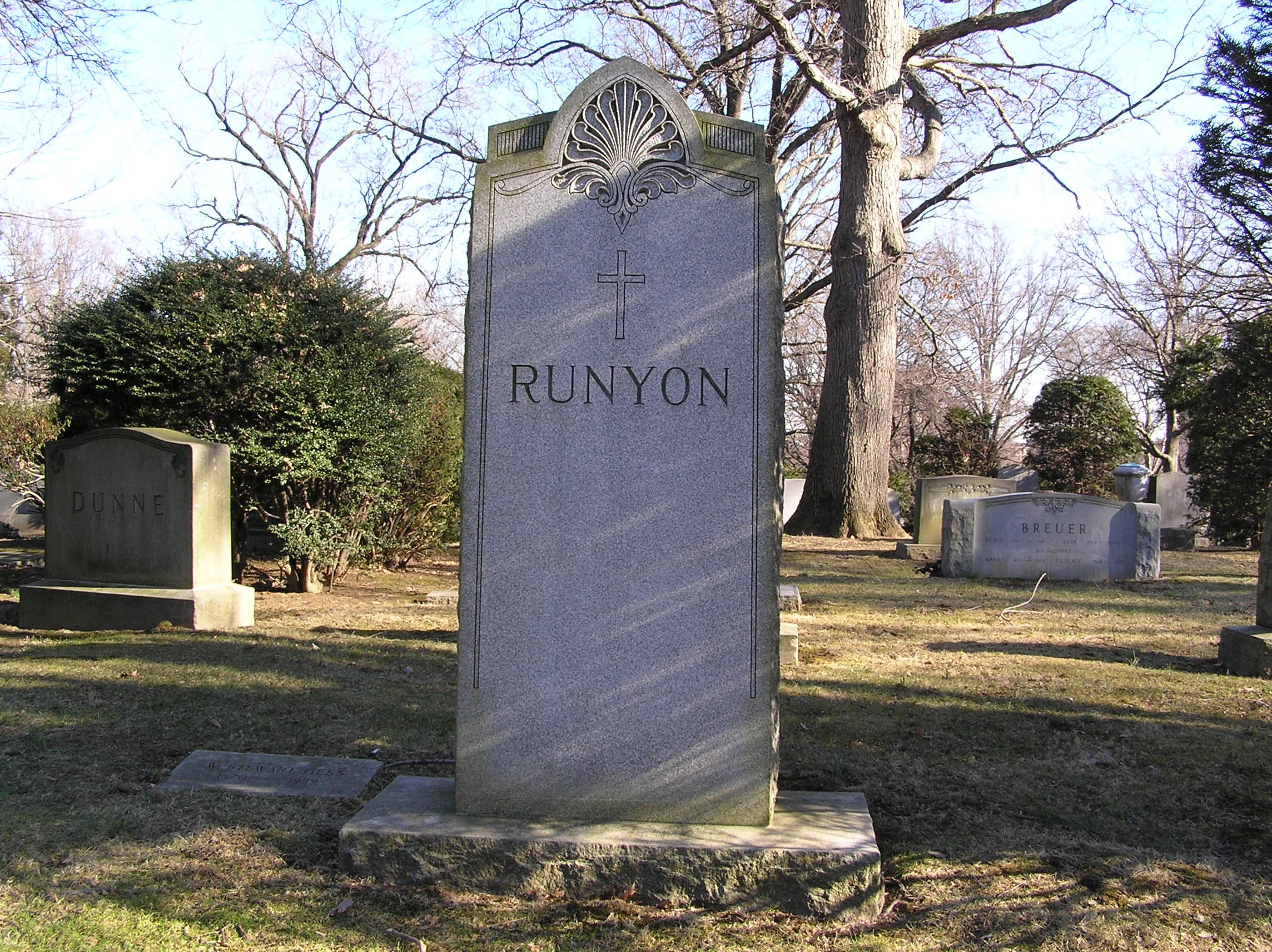
The family plot of Damon Runyon in Woodlawn Cemetery

In late 1946, the same year he and his second wife were divorced, Runyon died, at age 66, in New York City from the throat cancer that had been diagnosed two years earlier, in 1944, when he underwent an unsuccessful operation that left him practically unable to speak.

His body was cremated, and his ashes were scattered from a DC-3 airplane over Broadway in Manhattan by Eddie Rickenbacker on December 18, 1946. This was an infringement of the law but widely approved. The family plot of Damon Runyon is located at Woodlawn Cemetery in The Bronx, New York.

Runyon, in his will, left to his former second wife his house in Florida, his racing stables, and the money from his insurance. He split in half the royalties from his works to his children and Grande. His daughter Mary was eventually institutionalized for alcoholism while his son Damon Jr., after working as a journalist in Washington, D.C., died by suicide in 1968.

== Legacy ==
- After Runyon's death, his friend and fellow journalist Walter Winchell went on his radio program and appealed for contributions to help fight cancer, eventually establishing the Damon Runyon Cancer Memorial Fund to support scientific research into causes of, and prevention of, cancer.
- The first-ever telethon was hosted by Milton Berle in 1949 to raise funds for the Damon Runyon Cancer Research Foundation.
- Each year the Denver Press Club assigns the Damon Runyon Award to a prominent journalist. Past winners include Jimmy Breslin, Mike Royko, George Will and Bob Costas.
- Damon Runyon Elementary school in Littleton, Colorado is named after him.
- The Damon Runyon Stakes is a thoroughbred horse race run every December at Aqueduct Race Track. Runyon loved horse racing and ran a small stable of his own.
- In the mid-1930s, Runyon persuaded promoter Leo Seltzer to formally change his Roller Derby spectacle from a marathon roller-skating race into a full-contact team sport, an innovation that was eventually revived in a DIY spirit seven decades later.
- One block of West 45th Street (between 8th and 9th Avenues) in Manhattan's Hell's Kitchen is named Runyon's Way.
- The house in Manhattan, Kansas, where Runyon was born, is listed on the National Register of Historic Places.
- In 2008, The Library of America selected "The Eternal Blonde", Runyon's account of a 1927 murder trial, for inclusion in its two-century retrospective of American Crime Writing.
- Until January 1944, the 515th B-24 bomber squadron "Satan's Kids", of the 376th Bomber Group named their bombers after Runyon "Gangster" characters.

== Literary style – the "Broadway" stories ==
An illustration from "Breach of Promise" showing Spanish John and Harry the Horse

The English comedy writer Frank Muir comments that Runyon's plots were, in the manner of O. Henry, neatly constructed with professionally wrought endings, but their distinction lay in the manner of their telling, as the author invented a peculiar argot for his characters to speak. Runyon almost totally avoids the past tense (English humorist E. C. Bentley thought there was only one instance and was willing to "lay plenty of 6 to 5 that it is nothing but a misprint"), and makes little use of the future tense, using the present for both. He also avoided the conditional, using instead the future indicative in situations that would normally require conditional. An example: "Now most any doll on Broadway will be very glad indeed to have Handsome Jack Madigan give her a tumble" (Guys and Dolls, "Social Error"). Bentley comments that "there is a sort of ungrammatical purity about it [Runyon's resolute avoidance of the past tense], an almost religious exactitude." There is a homage to Runyon that makes use of this peculiarity ("Chronic Offender" by Spider Robinson), which involves a time machine and a man going by the name "Harry the Horse".

He uses many slang terms (which go unexplained in his stories), such as:

- pineapple = pineapple grenade
- roscoe/john roscoe/the old equalizer/that thing = gun
- shiv = knife
- noggin = head
- snoot = nose

There are many recurring composite phrases such as:

- ever-loving wife (occasionally "ever-loving doll")
- more than somewhat (or "no little, and quite some"); this phrase was so typical that it was used as the title of one of his short story collections
- loathe and despise
- one and all

Bentley notes that Runyon's "telling use of the recurrent phrase and fixed epithet" demonstrates a debt to Homer.

Runyon's stories also can employ rhyming slang, similar to that employed in cockney but native to New York (e.g.: "Miss Missouri Martin makes the following crack one night to her: 'Well, I do not see any Simple Simon on your lean and linger.' This is Miss Missouri Martin's way of saying she sees no diamond on Miss Billy Perry's finger." (from "Romance in the Roaring Forties")).

The comic effect of his style results in part from the juxtaposition of broad slang with mock pomposity. Women, when not "dolls", "Judies", "pancakes", "tomatoes", or "broads", may be "characters of a female nature", for example. He typically avoided contractions such as "don't" in the example above, which also contributes significantly to the humorously pompous effect. In one sequence, a gangster tells another character to do as he is told, or else "find another world in which to live".

In a contemporary introduction to The Damon Runyon Omnibus, the journalist Heywood Broun says that Runyon's prose style is based on a real dialect spoken in 1930s New York City: "He has caught with a high degree of insight the actual tone and phrase of the gangsters and racketeers of the town. Their talk is put down almost literally... Runyon has exercised the privilege of selectivity. But he has not heightened or burlesqued the speech of the people who come alive in his short stories."

Runyon's short stories are told in the first person by an unnamed character whose role is unclear; he knows many gangsters and does not appear to have a job, does not admit to any criminal involvement, and seems to be largely a bystander. He describes himself as "being known to one and all as a guy who is just around". The radio program The Damon Runyon Theatre dramatized 52 of Runyon's works in 1949, and for these the protagonist was given the name "Broadway", although it was admitted that this was not his real name, much in the way "Harry the Horse" and "Sorrowful Jones" are aliases.

== Literary works ==
=== Books ===
==== Poems ====
- The Tents of Trouble (1911)
- Rhymes of the Firing Line (1912)
- Poems for Men (1947)

==== Story collections ====
- Guys and Dolls (1932)
- Blue Plate Special (1934)
- Money From Home (1935)
- More Than Somewhat (1937)
- Furthermore (1938)
- Take It Easy (1938)
- My Wife Ethel (1939)
- My Old Man (1940)
- Runyon à la Carte (1944)
- In Our Town (1946)
- The Three Wise Guys and Other Stories (1946)
- Damon Runyon Favorites (1946)
- Trials and Other Tribulations (1947)

==== Collected newspaper columns ====
- Short Takes (1946)
- Trials and Other Tribulations (1947)

==== Collections containing previously collected material ====
- The Best of Runyon (1940)
- Damon Runyon Favorites (1942)
- The Damon Runyon Omnibus (1944)
- Runyon First and Last (1949)
- Runyon on Broadway (1950; introduction by E.C. Bentley)
- More Guys and Dolls (1950)
- The Turps (1951)
- Damon Runyon from First to Last (1954)
- A Treasury of Damon Runyon (1958)
- The Bloodhounds of Broadway and Other Stories (1985)
- Romance in the Roaring Forties and other stories (1986)
- On Broadway (1990)
- Guys, Dolls, and Curveballs: Damon Runyon on Baseball (2005; Jim Reisler, editor)
- Guys and Dolls and Other Writings (2008; introduction by Pete Hamill)

==== Play ====
- A Slight Case of Murder (with Howard Lindsay, 1940)

==== Biography ====
- Capt. Eddie Rickenbacker (with W. Kiernan, 1942)

=== Stories ===
There are many collections of Runyon's stories, in particular Runyon on Broadway and Runyon from First to Last. A publisher's note in the latter claims that collection contains all of Runyon's short stories not included in Runyon on Broadway, but two Broadway stories originally published in Collier's Weekly are not in either collection: "Maybe a Queen" and "Leopard's Spots", both collected in More Guys And Dolls (1950). The radio show The Damon Runyon Theater, in addition, has a story, "Joe Terrace", that appears in More Guys and Dolls and the August 29, 1936, issue of Colliers. It is one of his "Our Town" stories that does not appear in the "In Our Town" book, and the only episode of the show which is not a Broadway' story; however, the action is changed in the show from Our Town to Broadway.

The "Our Town" stories are short vignettes of life in a small town, largely based on Runyon's experiences. They are written in a simple, descriptive style and contain twists and odd endings based on the personalities of the people involved. Each story's title is the name of the principal character. Twenty-seven of them were published in the 1946 book In Our Town.

Runyon on Broadway contains the following stories:

More Than Somewhat

- Breach of Promise
- Romance in the Roaring Forties
- Dream Street Rose
- The Old Doll's House
- Blood Pressure
- The Bloodhounds of Broadway
- Tobias the Terrible
- The Snatching of Bookie Bob
- The Lily of St. Pierre
- Hold 'em, Yale
- Earthquake
- 'Gentlemen, the King!'
- A Nice Price
- Broadway Financier
- The Brain Goes Home

Furthermore

- Madame La Gimp
- Dancing Dan's Christmas
- Sense of Humour
- Lillian
- Little Miss Marker
- Pick the Winner
- Undertaker Song
- Butch Minds the Baby
- The Hottest Guy in the World
- The Lemon Drop Kid
- What, No Butler?
- The Three Wise Guys
- A Very Honourable Guy
- Princess O'Hara
- Social Error

Take It Easy

- Tight Shoes
- Lonely Heart
- The Brakeman's Daughter
- Cemetery Bait
- It Comes Up Mud
- The Big Umbrella
- For a Pal
- Big Shoulders
- That Ever-Loving Wife of Hymie's
- Neat Strip
- Bred for Battle
- Too Much Pep
- Baseball Hattie
- Situation Wanted
- A Piece of Pie
- A Job for the Macarone
- All Horse Players Die Broke

'Runyon from First to Last' includes the following stories and sketches:

The First Stories (early non-Broadway stories):

- The Defence of Strikerville
- Fat Fallon
- Two Men Named Collins. First published in Reader Magazine, [Date Unknown]
- As Between Friends
- The Informal Execution of Soupbone Pew
- My Father

Stories à la Carte (Broadway stories written in Runyonese):

- Money from Home
- A Story Goes With It
- Broadway Complex
- So You Won't Talk!
- Dark Dolores
- Delegates at Large
- A Light in France
- Old Em's Kentucky Home
- Johnny One-Eye
- Broadway Incident
- The Idyll of Miss Sarah Brown
- The Melancholy Dane
- Barbecue
- Little Pinks
- Palm Beach Santa Claus
- Cleo
- The Lacework Kid

The Last Stories (Broadway stories written in Runyonese):

- Blonde Mink
- Big Boy Blues

Written in Sickness (sketches):

- Why Me?
- The Doctor Knows Best
- No Life
- Good Night
- Bed-Warmers
- Sweet Dreams
- Passing the Word Along
- Death Pays a Social Call

'In Our Town' contains the following stories:

- Our Old Man (originally titled On Good Turns)
- Samuel Graze
- Pete Hankins
- Jeremiah Zore
- Mrs. Judson
- The Happiness Joneses
- Mrs. McGregor
- Doc Brackett
- Officer Lipscomber
- Marigold and Maidie So
- Sterling Curlew
- Doc Mindler
- Mrs. Pilplay
- Sheriff Harding
- Boswell Van Dusen
- Dr. Davenport
- Mrs. Bogane
- Sam Crable
- Ancil Toombs
- Amy Vederman
- Peter Chowles
- Judge Juggins
- Banker Beaverbrook
- Judge Joes
- Angel Kake
- Bet Ragle
- Hank Smith

The following "Our Town" stories were not included in In Our Town:

- Joe Terrace
- Burge McCall
- Lou Louder

=== Uncollected stories ===
- The Art of High Grading. Illustrated Sunday Magazine, January 2, 1910
- The Sucker. San Francisco Examiner, July 10, 1910
- Burge McCall. Collier's, July 11, 1936 (not in Runyonese)
- Lou Louder. Collier's, August 8, 1936 (not in Runyonese)
- Nothing Happens in Brooklyn. Collier's, April 30, 1938 (partly in Runyonese, but includes past tense)

=== Film ===
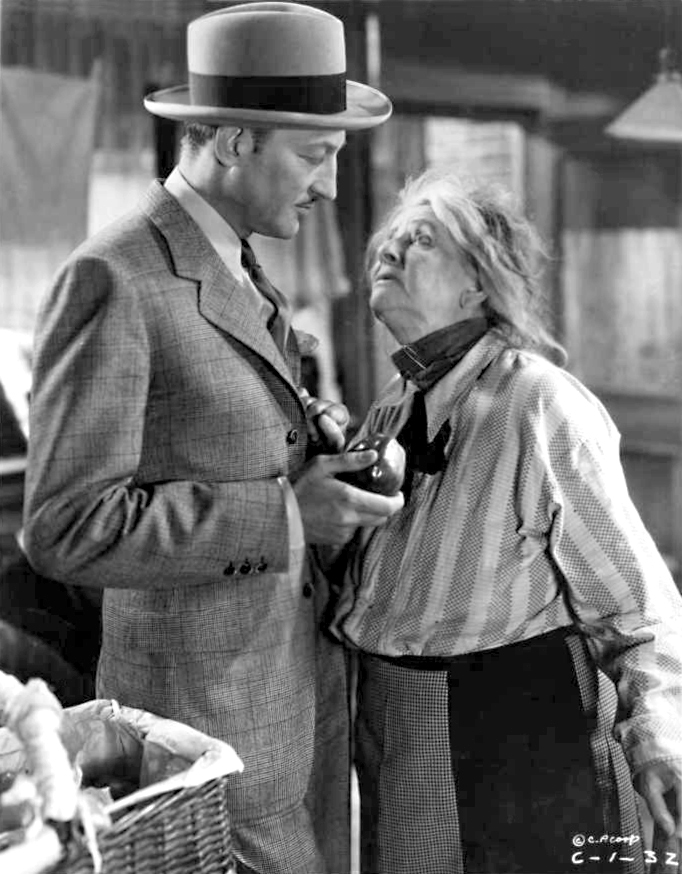
Dave the Dude (Warren William) and Apple Annie (May Robson) in Lady for a Day (1933)

More than twenty of his stories became motion pictures.

- Lady for a Day (1933) – Adapted by Robert Riskin, who suggested the name change from Runyon's title "Madame La Gimp". The film garnered Academy Award nominations for Best Picture, Best Director (Frank Capra), Best Actress (May Robson), and Best Adaptation for the Screen (Riskin). It was remade by Capra as Pocketful of Miracles in 1961, with Bette Davis in the Apple Annie role (fused with the "raggedy doll" from Runyon's short story "The Brain Goes Home"); The film received Oscar nominations for composers Sammy Cahn and Jimmy Van Heusen and for co-star Peter Falk (Best Supporting Actor). In 1989, Jackie Chan adapted the story yet again for the Hong Kong action film Miracles, adding several of his trademark stunt sequences.
- A Very Honorable Guy (1934) – Starring Joe E. Brown and Alice White
- Little Miss Marker (1934) – The film that made Shirley Temple a star, launched her career, and pushed her past Greta Garbo as the nation's biggest film draw of the year. Also starred Charles Bickford. Subsequent remakes include Sorrowful Jones (1949) with Bob Hope and Lucille Ball; 40 Pounds of Trouble (1962) with Tony Curtis, and Little Miss Marker (1980) with Walter Matthau, Julie Andrews, Bob Newhart and Curtis.
- Midnight Alibi (1934) – Starring Richard Barthelmess, Ann Dvorak and Helen Chandler, adapted from Runyon's story "The Old Doll's House".
- The Lemon Drop Kid (1934) – Starring Lee Tracy, remade in 1951 with Bob Hope (and I Love Lucy co-star William Frawley appearing in both adaptations); the latter version introduced the Christmas song "Silver Bells".
- Princess O'Hara (1935) – Starring Jean Parker, remade in 1943 as It Ain't Hay with Abbott and Costello and Patsy O'Connor
- Hold 'Em Yale (1935) – Starring Patricia Ellis, Cesar Romero, Buster Crabbe, William Frawley, Andy Devine and George Barbier
- Professional Soldier (1935) – an adventure story starring Victor McLaglen and Freddie Bartholomew
- The Three Wise Guys (1936) – starring Robert Young and Betty Furness.
- A Slight Case of Murder (1938) with Edward G. Robinson, remade in 1953 as Stop, You're Killing Me with Broderick Crawford and Claire Trevor
- Joe and Ethel Turp Call on the President (1939) with Ann Sothern, Lewis Stone and Walter Brennan.
- Tight Shoes (1941) – starring John Howard, Broderick Crawford, Leo Carrillo, Binnie Barnes, Anne Gwynne and Shemp Howard.
- The Big Street (1942) – Henry Fonda, Lucille Ball (adapted from Runyon's story "Little Pinks")
- Butch Minds the Baby (1942) – Starring Broderick Crawford and Shemp Howard.
- Johnny One-Eye (1950) – Starring Pat O'Brien, Wayne Morris, Delores Moran and Gayle Reed
- Money from Home (1953) – Starring Dean Martin and Jerry Lewis
- Guys and Dolls (1955) – Marlon Brando, Jean Simmons, Frank Sinatra, Vivian Blaine, and Stubby Kaye. Blaine and Kaye reprised their roles from the 1950 Broadway production. Adapted from the story "The Idyll of Miss Sarah Brown". The big craps game is adapted from the story "Blood Pressure".
- Bloodhounds of Broadway (1952) – Musical comedy starring Mitzi Gaynor and directed by Harmon Jones
- Bloodhounds of Broadway (1989) – Ensemble cast starring Matt Dillon, Jennifer Grey, Madonna, and Julie Hagerty, among others. The film combines elements from four stories into one large one: "A Very Honorable Guy", "The Brain Goes Home", "Social Error", and "The Bloodhounds of Broadway".

In 1938, his unproduced play Saratoga Chips became the basis of The Ritz Brothers film Straight, Place and Show.

=== Plays and musicals ===
- A Slight Case of Murder (1935) co-written for Broadway with Howard Lindsay
- Guys and Dolls (1950) starring Robert Alda (Sky Masterson), Vivian Blaine (Miss Adelaide), Sam Levene (Nathan Detroit), Isabel Bigley (Sarah Brown), Pat Rooney Sr., B.S. Pully, Stubby Kaye, Johnny Silver, Tom Pedi. Adapted from Runyon's stories "The Idyll of Miss Sarah Brown" and "Blood Pressure".

=== Radio ===
The Damon Runyon Theater radio series dramatized 52 of Runyon's short stories in weekly broadcasts running from October 1948 to September 1949 (with reruns until 1951). The series was produced by Alan Ladd's Mayfair Transcription Company for syndication to local radio stations. John Brown played the character "Broadway", who doubled as host and narrator. The cast also comprised Alan Reed, Luis Van Rooten, Joseph Du Val, Gerald Mohr, Frank Lovejoy, Herb Vigran, Sheldon Leonard, William Conrad, Jeff Chandler, Lionel Stander, Sidney Miller, Olive Deering and Joe De Santis. Pat O'Brien was initially engaged for the role of "Broadway". The original stories were adapted for the radio by Russell Hughes.

"Broadway's New York had a crisis each week, though the streets had a rose-tinged aura", wrote radio historian John Dunning. "The sad shows then were all the sadder; plays like For a Pal had a special poignance. The bulk of Runyon's work had been untapped by radio, and the well was deep."

=== Television ===
Damon Runyon Theatre aired on CBS-TV from 1955 to 1956.

Mike McShane told Runyon stories as monologues on British TV in 1994, and an accompanying book was released, both titled Broadway Stories.

Three Wise Guys was a 2005 TV movie.
