= Runyon Lake =

Lake Pueblo, Colorado, US

- Fountain Lakes
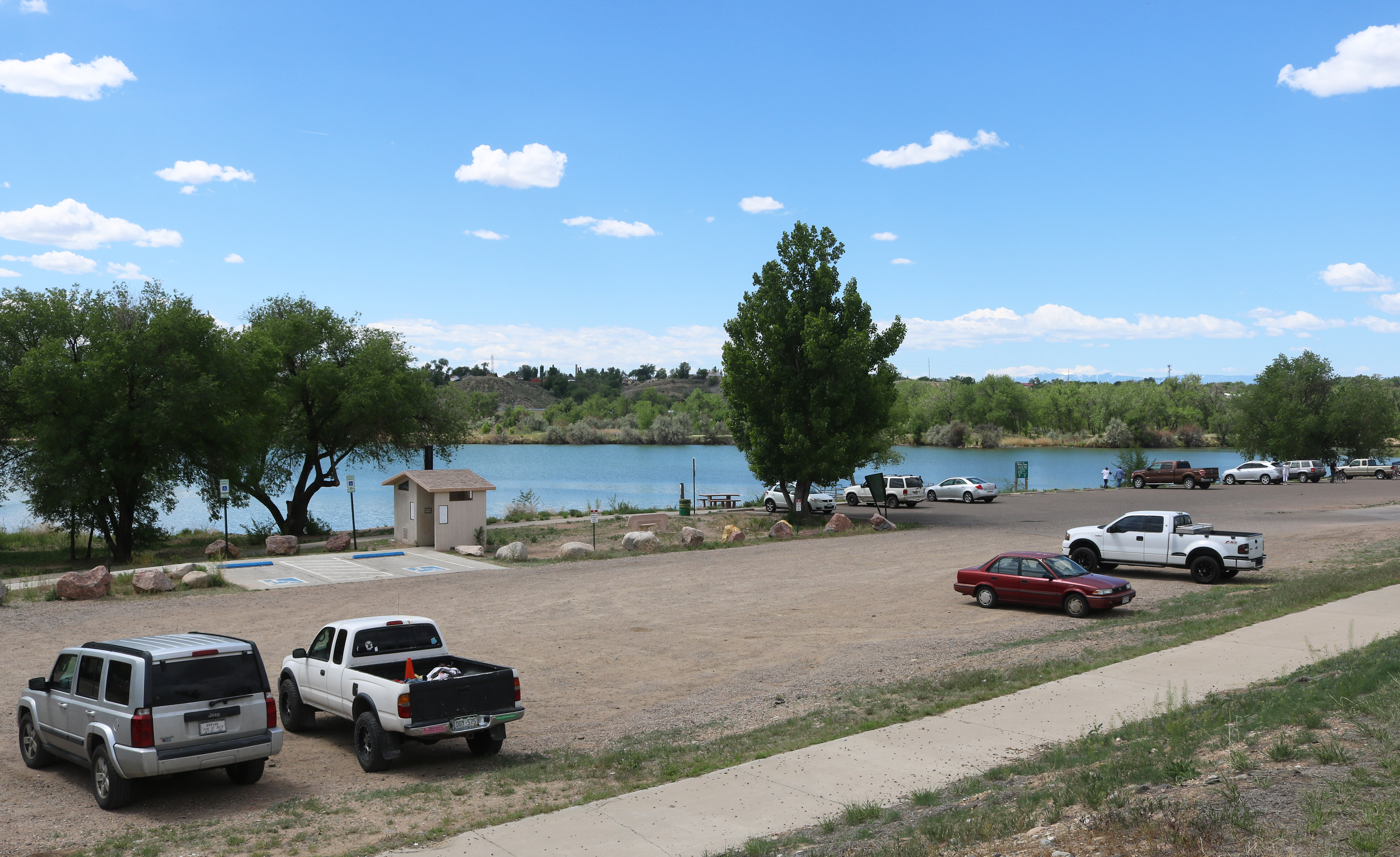
- The parking area at Runyon Lake.

- Location within Colorado Location within the United States
- Location: Pueblo, Colorado, United States
- Coordinates: 38°15′14″N 104°36′00″W
- Basin countries: United States
- Surface area: 35 acres (14 ha)
- Settlements: Pueblo

Runyon Lake (formerly known as Fountain Lakes) is located in Pueblo, Colorado. It was originally used as a dredge pond for the Rocky Mountain Steel Mill, it is approximately 35 acres (14 ha) in size, and is fed by the Arkansas River.

It is used solely for fishing and is stocked by the Colorado Parks and Wildlife. Boating is restricted to hand launched craft under 15 feet (4.6 m) in length (including float tubes and personal pontoons). Boats may be propelled by hand, wind, or electric motors only. Ice fishing, swimming, open fires and camping are all prohibited.

== Fish ==
Runyon Lake is home to several different fish species. Included species are white crappie, green sunfish, bluegill, black bullhead, saugeye, channel catfish, large mouth bass and rainbow trout. The lake has previously held the record in Colorado for the biggest catfish catch. The catfish was 38.5 inches long and weighed 29.5 pounds.
