= Let It Ride (musical) =

1961 Broadway musical

- Playbill cover George Gobel & Sam Levene
- Music: Jay Livingston; Ray Evans
- Lyrics: Jay Livingston; Ray Evans
- Book: Abram S. Ginnes
- Basis: Play by George Abbott; John Cecil Holm; Three Men on a Horse
- Productions: 1961 Broadway

Let It Ride is a Broadway musical based on the 1935 Broadway farce Three Men on a Horse by George Abbott and John Cecil Holm. The musical, with book by Abram S. Ginnes and music and lyrics by Jay Livingston and Ray Evans, choreographer Onna White, assistant choreographer Eugene Louis Faccuito (Luigi), opened on Broadway in New York City at the Eugene O'Neill Theatre on October 12, 1961, and played 69 performances including one preview. The original Broadway production co-starred George Gobel and Sam Levene and featured Barbara Nichols and Paula Stewart.

Erwin Trowbridge, a mild-mannered man working for a greeting card company, has an unusual talent: he can pick the winners of horse races with uncanny accuracy, as long as he does not place a bet himself. When a few professional gamblers discover his talent, they do their best to exploit it.

Sam Levene created the role of Patsy in the original Broadway production of Three Men on a Horse (1935) which was a mega-hit in 1935, running an extraordinary 835 performances; three decades later, Levene recreated the role of Patsy in the original Broadway musical Let It Ride. Levene also recreated the role of Patsy in the 1936 Warner Bros. film Three Men on a Horse and a ten-month 1944 USO tour of Three Men on a Horse which played 200 shows to 120,000 servicemen, the first legitimate theatrical production mounted overseas. Levene performed the title song from Let It Ride on a racetrack grandstand parade float accompanied with a bevy of showgirls in the 1961 Macy's Thanksgiving Day Parade presented on NBC, November 23, 1961.

Two songs from Let It Ride are included on the compilation album Lost Broadway 1961 from Stage Door Records; George Gobel as Erwin sings Hey, Jimmy, Joe, John, Jim, Jack and Sam Levene as Patsy leads the company singing the title song Let It Ride.

== Songs ==
Act 1

- Run, Run, Run - Singers and Dancers
- The Nicest Thing - Audrey
- Hey, Jimmy, Joe, John, Jim, Jack - Erwin
- Broads Ain't People - Erwin, Harry, Frankie and Charlie
- Let It Ride - Patsy, Singers and Dancers
- I'll Learn Ya - Erwin and Patsy
- Love Let Me Know - Audrey and Carver
- Happy Birthday - Birthday Girls
- Everything Beautiful - Erwin and Birthday Girls
- Who's Doing What to Erwin - Audrey, Chief Schermerhorn, Carver and Mother
- I Wouldn't Have Had To - Mabel

Act II

- There's Something About a Horse - Singers and Dancers
- He Needs You - Erwin, Frankie and Charlie
- Just an Honest Mistake - Chief Schermerhorn, Repulski and Cops
- His Own Little Island - Erwin
- If Flutterby Wins - Erwin, Patsy, Frankie, Charlie, Harry and Hoods
