= Charles Paul =

Charles Paul may refer to:

- Charles Paul (composer) (1902–1990), American composer and organist
- Charles Paul (cricketer) (born 1933), Guyanese cricketer
- Charles H. Paul (born 1890), lawyer and judge in Washington state
- Charles Ferguson Paul (1902–1965), United States federal judge
- Charles Kegan Paul (1828–1902), English publisher and author
