= George Gobel =

American comedian and actor (1919–1991)

- Gobel in 1959
- Born: George Leslie Goebel; May 20, 1919; Chicago, Illinois
- Died: February 24, 1991 (aged 71); Los Angeles, California
- Resting place: San Fernando Mission Cemetery
- Occupations: Singer; actor; comedian
- Years active: 1950–1988
- Spouse: Alice R. Gobel (m. 1942)
- Children: 3

George Leslie Goebel (May 20, 1919 – February 24, 1991) was an American humorist, actor, and comedian. He was best known as the star of his own weekly comedy variety television series, The George Gobel Show, on NBC from 1954 to 1959 and on CBS from 1959 to 1960 (alternating in its last season with The Jack Benny Program). He was also a familiar panelist on the NBC game show Hollywood Squares.

== Early years ==
He was born George Leslie Goebel in Chicago on May 20, 1919, the only child of Hermann and Lillian (MacDonald) Goebel. His father, Hermann Goebel, who was then working as a butcher and grocer, had immigrated to the United States in the 1890s with his parents from the Austro-Hungarian Empire. His mother, Lillian (MacDonald) Goebel, was a native of Illinois, as was her mother, while Lillian's father, a tugboat captain, had immigrated from Scotland.

Even before his 1937 graduation from Theodore Roosevelt High School in Chicago, Gobel was a country music singer on the National Barn Dance on Chicago's WLS radio and later on KMOX in St. Louis. In 1942, Gobel married his high-school sweetheart, Alice Rose Humecki. During World War II, he enlisted in the United States Army Air Forces and served as a flight instructor in Curtiss AT-9 aircraft at Altus, Oklahoma, and later in Martin B-26 Marauder bombers at Frederick, Oklahoma. In a 1969 appearance on The Tonight Show Starring Johnny Carson, Gobel joked about his stateside wartime service: "There was not one Japanese aircraft that got past Tulsa." He resumed his career as an entertainer after the war, although he decided to focus predominantly on comedy rather than just singing.

== Television ==
Gobel debuted his comedy series on NBC on October 2, 1954. It showcased his quiet, homespun style of humor, a low-key alternative to what audiences had seen on Milton Berle's shows. A huge success, the popular series made the crew-cut Gobel one of the biggest comedy stars of the 1950s. The weekly show featured vocalist Peggy King and actress Jeff Donnell (semiregularly), as well as numerous guest artists, including such stars as James Stewart, Henry Fonda, Fred MacMurray, Kirk Douglas, and Tennessee Ernie Ford. In 1955, Gobel won an Emmy Award for "most outstanding new personality." On October 24, 1954, Gobel did a 12-minute spot on Light's Diamond Jubilee, a two-hour TV special broadcast on all four U.S. television networks of the time.

Gobel and his business manager David P. O'Malley formed a production company, Gomalco, a composite of their last names. In addition to Gobel's own series, the company produced the first four years (1957–61) of Leave It to Beaver, as well as the films The Birds and the Bees (1956) and I Married a Woman (1958), both starring Gobel.

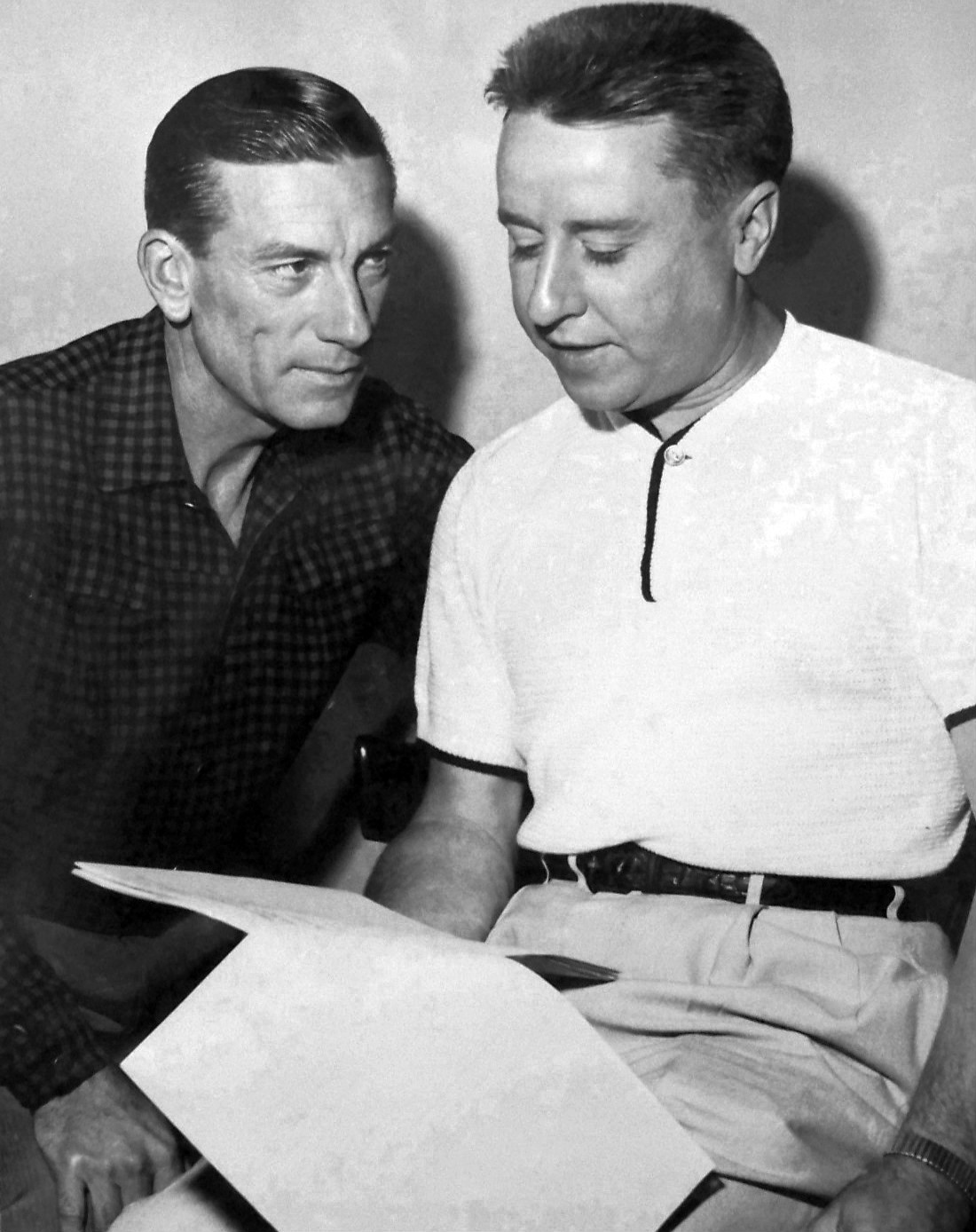
Hoagy Carmichael and George Gobel in 1954

The centerpiece of Gobel's comedy show was his monolog about his supposed past situations and experiences, with stories and sketches allegedly about his real-life wife, Alice (nicknamed "Spooky Old Alice"), played by actress Jeff Donnell (for the first four years of the series' run). Gobel's hesitant, almost shy delivery and penchant for tangled digressions were the chief sources of comedy, more important than the actual content of the stories. His monologs popularized several catchphrases, notably "Well, I'll be a dirty bird" (later used by the Kathy Bates character in the 1990 film Misery), "You can't hardly get them like that no more", and "Well then there now" (repeated by James Dean during a brief imitation of Gobel in the 1955 film Rebel Without a Cause and used as part of the closing lyric in Perry Como's 1956 hit record "Juke Box Baby"). Gobel's show used some of television's top writers of the era: Hal Kanter, Jack Brooks, and Norman Lear. Peggy King was a regular on the series as a vocalist, and the guest stars included such notables as Shirley MacLaine, Evelyn Rudie, Bob Feller, Phyllis Avery, and Vampira.

Gobel labeled himself "Lonesome George", and the nickname stuck for the rest of his career. The show sometimes included a segment in which Gobel appeared with a guitar, started to sing, then got sidetracked into a story, with the song always left unfinished after fitful starts and stops, a comedy approach akin to one used by Victor Borge and the Smothers Brothers. Tommy Smothers noted that Gobel "was my motivation when I got into comedy originally", observing that "he didn't do jokes—he did timing and played the guitar." Gobel had a scaled-down version of the Gibson L-5 archtop guitar constructed to suit his own smaller stature. Several dozen of this "L-5CT" or "George Gobel" model were produced in the late 1950s and early 1960s. He also played the harmonica.

In 1957, three U.S. Air Force B-52 Stratofortress bombers made the first nonstop round-the-world flight by turbojet aircraft. One of the bombers was called Lonesome George. The crew later appeared on Gobel's primetime television show and recounted the 45-hour-and-19-minute mission. Lonesome George, the nonbreeding Galapagos tortoise that was the last of his subspecies and that died in June 2012, was also named after Gobel.

From 1958 to 1961, Gobel appeared in Las Vegas at the El Rancho Vegas and in Reno at the Mapes Hotel. In 1961, Gobel and Sam Levene starred as Erwin and Patsy in Let It Ride, an original Broadway musical based on the 1935 original Broadway play Three Men on a Horse (1935) co-authored by George Abbott and John Cecil Holm, which had an initial Broadway run of 835 performances, also starring Sam Levene as Patsy. With a book written by Abram S. Ginnes and a score by Jay Livingston and Ray Evans, Let It Ride was directed by Stanley Prager, then a successful TV director of the popular sitcom Car 54, Where Are You? Let It Ride opened at the Eugene O'Neill Theatre October 12, 1961, and closed December 9 after 68 performances and one preview. Critics compared the show unfavorably to How to Succeed in Business .... He continued to work club dates and performed in many of the Playboy Club properties.

Gobel was also a skilled guitar player, and as such was issued a specially designed electric guitar in his name commissioned by the Gibson Guitar Company in 1959 - the George Gobel Model. Gibson chose "George Gobel" as a model name, as Gobel was one of the most well-known television personalities at the time with a nationally broadcast show five nights a week. Gibson believed its new model guitar would enjoy greater exposure on national television, as opposed to naming the model after a lesser-known jazz musician, for example. Gobel accompanied himself with this guitar on a number of his comedy routines.

== TV guest appearances ==
Gobel was a guest on various TV programs, including: The Andy Williams Show;The Red Skelton Show; The Dean Martin Show; What's My Line; The Ford Show, Starring Tennessee Ernie Ford; The Bing Crosby Show; The Dinah Shore Show; Death Valley Days; Wagon Train; The Carol Burnett Show; The Donny & Marie Show; and Johnny Carson's The Tonight Show, and made cameos on Rowan & Martin's Laugh-In. An episode of My Three Sons in December 1960 was titled "Lonesome George", in which Gobel played himself. He appeared on F Troop as amateur inventor Henry Terkel in the 1966 episode "Go for Broke".

In an often-replayed segment from a 1969 episode of The Tonight Show Starring Johnny Carson, Gobel entered after Bob Hope and Dean Martin, walking onstage with a plastic cup with an unidentified drink. Gobel remarked to Carson about coming on last and having to follow major stars Hope and Martin. He quipped to Carson, "Did you ever get the feeling that the world was a tuxedo and you were a pair of brown shoes?", to which Carson, Hope, Martin, and the audience came unglued with laughter. After the laughter died down, Carson asked Gobel about his career in World War II as a fighter pilot. Gobel feigned bewilderment at why people laugh when he says that he spent the war in Oklahoma, pointing out with mock pride that no Japanese plane ever got past Tulsa, deep in the center of the continental U.S. Gobel also began to get some unexpected laughs, being unaware that Dean Martin had begun flicking his cigarette ashes into Gobel's drink. Observing all of this, Carson finally asked rhetorically, "Exactly what time did I lose control of the show?!"

Gobel had employed the tuxedo joke at least once before, on the June 22, 1957, episode of his show. He complained that the TV director and crew treated him "as if they were a tuxedo and I was a pair of brown shoes." On that occasion, the gag received a respectable, but not overwhelming, response.

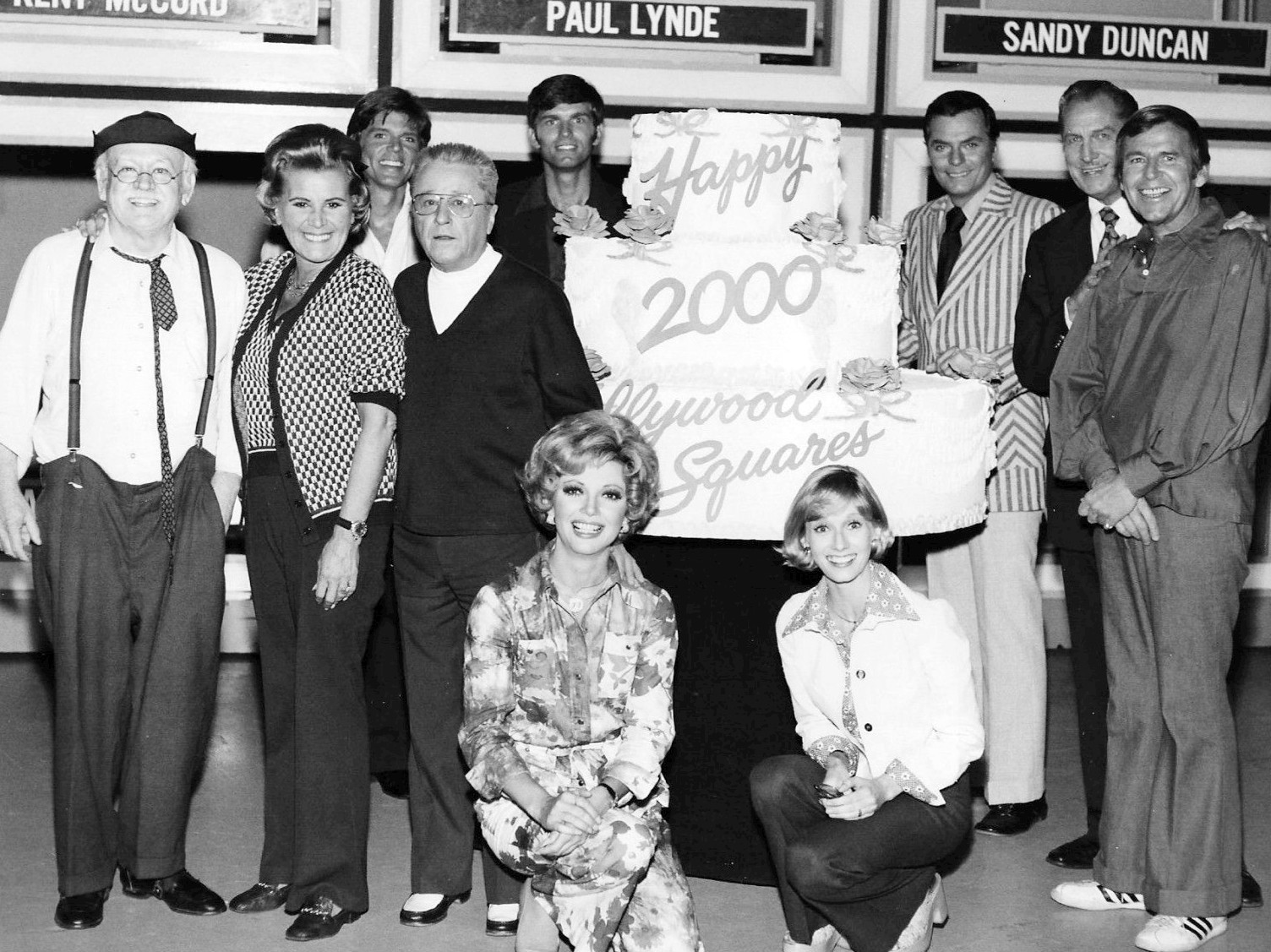
Photo from the television game show Hollywood Squares to celebrate the 2,000th episode in 1974. Pictured are Cliff Arquette as Charley Weaver, Rose Marie, John Davidson, Gobel, Kent McCord, Peter Marshall, Vincent Price, Paul Lynde; Ruta Lee and Sandy Duncan, foreground.

In 1972, the television game show Hollywood Squares, hosted by Peter Marshall, needed a substitute for its resident folksy comedian Cliff Arquette (Charley Weaver), who had a stroke. Gobel was recruited, and he sat in Arquette's square during his convalescence. After Arquette died in 1974, Gobel became a resident panelist. He was also the voice of Father Mouse in the 1974 Christmas special 'Twas the Night Before Christmas, and sang the song "Give Your Heart a Try" in that production. He also made a guest appearance on Hee Haw in 1976. In the early 1980s, Gobel played Otis Harper, Jr., the mayor of Harper Valley in the television series based on the film Harper Valley PTA, and guest-starred as himself on an episode of Madame's Place.

== Films ==
When ratings soared on The George Gobel Show (rated in the top 10 of 1954–55), Paramount Pictures promoted Gobel as its new comedy star, casting him as the lead in The Birds and the Bees (1956), a remake of The Lady Eve (1941) featuring David Niven playing a third-billed supporting role under Gobel and leading lady Mitzi Gaynor. In 1956, Paramount was preparing a biography of veteran comedian Buster Keaton, and Keaton wanted Gobel to portray him. When musical-comedy star Donald O'Connor became available, Paramount signed him for the film, titled The Buster Keaton Story (1957).

Gobel's television success did not translate to the big screen, though. His The Birds and the Bees performed so poorly at the box office that release was delayed on his second movie, I Married a Woman, filmed in 1956 by RKO Radio Pictures, but not released until 1958. Although scripted by Goodman Ace, it also resulted in disappointing ticket sales, and Gobel's career as a movie star came to an abrupt end. He settled into a succession of TV guest-star appearances and did not return to movie screens until two decades later, as a character actor in Joan Rivers' Rabbit Test (1978), followed by The Day It Came to Earth (1979) and Ellie (1984). He appeared in nine TV movies during the 1970s and 1980s.

Gobel was considered for the voice of Winnie-the-Pooh by Walt Disney, but turned it down after reading the books and finding Pooh to be "an awful bore."

== Death ==
George Gobel died on February 24, 1991, about a month after surgery that was intended to improve his mobility after a series of strokes left him unable to walk. His remains are in the San Fernando Mission Cemetery in Mission Hills, Los Angeles, California.

== Filmography ==
Year	Title	Role	Notes
1956	The Birds and the Bees	George "Hotsy" Hamilton II	
1958	I Married a Woman	Marshall "Mickey" Briggs	
1977	The Day It Came to Earth	Prof. Bartholomew	
1978	Rabbit Test	The President of the U. S.	
1984	Ellie	Preacher	
