= Martin Kane =

Martin Kane may refer to:

- Martin Kane, ring name for Andrew Martin, professional wrestler
- Martin Kane, Private Eye, a radio and television drama
