= Three Men on a Horse =

Play by George Abbott and John Cecil Holm

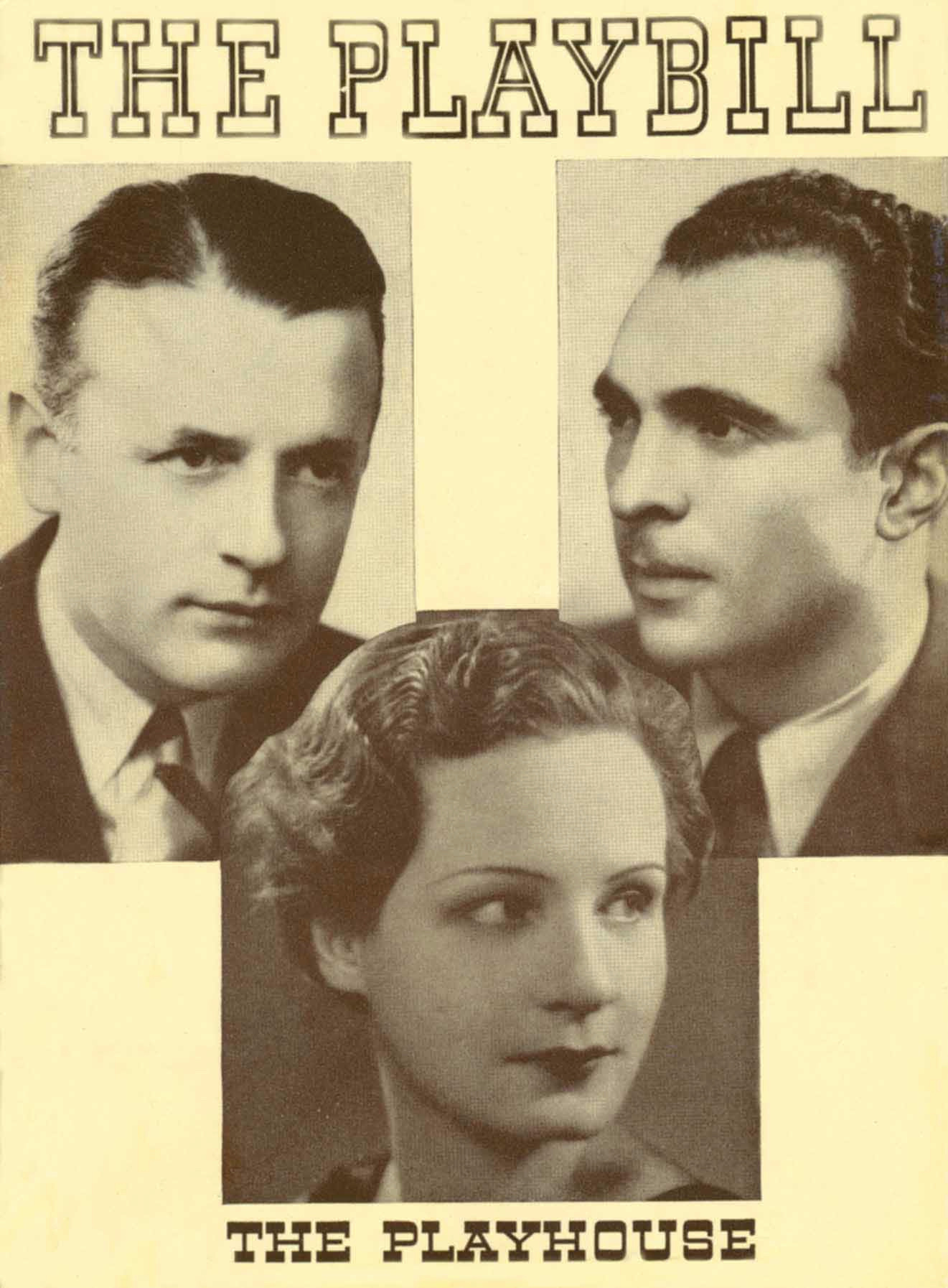
- Playbill for the 1935 original Broadway production of Three Men on a Horse starring William Lynn, Sam Levene and Shirley Booth
- Original language: English
- Written by: George Abbott; John Cecil Holm
- Genre: Farce
- Setting: Ozone Heights, New Jersey; Lavillere Hotel, New York City; 1935

Premiere
- Date: January 30, 1935
- Place: Playhouse Theatre; New York City

Three Men on a Horse is a three-act farce co-authored by John Cecil Holm and George Abbott. The comedy focuses on a man who discovers he has a talent for choosing the winning horse in a race as long as he never places a bet himself. Originally titled Hobby Horse by John Cecil Holm, Three Men On A Horse was a property controlled and produced by Alex Yokel, who reached out to Warner Bros. for financial assistance; Warner agreed to provide financing on the condition Yokel find someone to doctor the script and direct the Broadway production. George Abbott, the director, who had since 1932 directed and produced each of his Broadway productions, immediately saw the potential. He rewrote the script and agreed to direct if he received co-author credit and split the author's royalties with Holm. Abbott wrote a third act, resulting in a new three-act play titled Three Men on a Horse.

== Plot ==
Mild-mannered Erwin Trowbridge, bored with his suburban New Jersey life with his wife and brother-in-law and frustrated by his low-paying job writing greeting card verses, decides to declare his independence by skipping work and spending the day in a local saloon. There he meets three men who make a living by betting on horse races. When they discover Erwin has an almost supernatural ability to go through a racing form and pick the winners, they persuade him to join them at a New York City hotel and regularly give them tips. Complications arise when Erwin begins to miss his wife and job and his cronies insist he put some money on a horse himself, despite his claim he will lose his power if he places a bet.

== Productions ==
The play, a farce, has been produced on Broadway four times. The original Broadway production was a qualified smash hit, and opened at the Playhouse Theatre on January 30, 1935, and remained there until November 1936, when it transferred to the Fulton Theatre, for the last three months of its two-year Broadway long-run, closing January 9, 1937, after 835 performances, the longest Broadway production ever. Directed by co-author George Abbott, with a set design by Boris Aronson, the opening night cast starred Sam Levene as Patsy, Shirley Booth as Mabel, William Lynn as Erwin Trowbridge and Teddy Hart as Frankie; Garson Kanin performed the featured role of Al, and later became assistant to director and co-author, George Abbott.

The first UK production of Three Men On A Horse premiered at Wyndham's Theatre, London on February 18, 1936. Produced by Alex Yokel, the three act farce had an abbreviated run of only 236 performances and closed December 9, 1936. Performed by an American cast including: Bernard Nedell as Patsy, David Burns as Frankie, Romney Brent as Erwin, Three Men On A Horse depends on casting performers who are skillful at comedic timing and slapstick comedy. Since the John Cecil Holm and George Abbott script includes references not generally known in Britain, the theatrical program had a glossary so the audience would understand the expressions used in the play, which may have been a reason for its shorter run versus the original Broadway production.

The first Broadway revival opened at the Forrest Theatre on October 9, 1942, and only ran for 28 performances. Directed by John Cecil Holm, the cast included Horace McMahon as Patsy.

A second Broadway revival opened at the Lyceum Theatre on October 16, 1969 and closed January 10, 1970, after four previews and 100 performances, the second longest running Broadway production. Like the original Broadway production, the all star 1969 revival was directed by George Abbott and starred original Broadway star Sam Levene, reprising his legendary performance as Patsy he created thirty-five years earlier in the original Broadway production, Jack Gilford as Erwin Trowbridge, Dorothy Loudon as Mabel, Butterfly McQueen as Dora Lee, the Elevator Operator, Paul Ford as Mr. Carver, Hal Linden as Charlie and Rosemary Prinz as Audrey Trowbridge

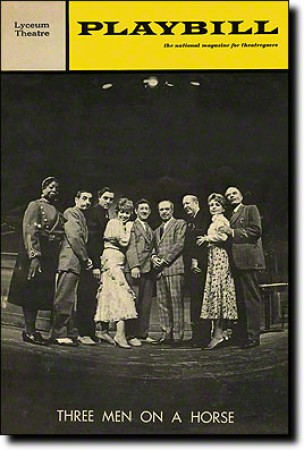
Playbill cover 1969 Three Men on a Horse all-star Broadway revival starring Sam Levene, Paul Ford, Jack Gilford, Dorothy Loudon, Hal Linden, Butterfly McQueen, Rosemary Prinz

The third Broadway revival produced by the National Actors Theatre directed by John Tillinger also opened at the Lyceum Theatre on April 13, 1993 and closed May 16, 1993 after a brief run of only 24 previews and 39 performances. The Broadway revival starred The Odd Couple television stars Tony Randall as Erwin Trowbridge and Jack Klugman as Patsy, Jerry Stiller as Charlie, Ellen Greene as Mabel and Julie Hagerty as Audrey Trowbridge. The first UK revival was staged by the Royal National Theatre from January 22, 1987 through June 27, 1987. Starring Toyah Willcox, Ken Stott, Desmond Barrit and Geoffrey Hutchings. The production received the Laurence Olivier Award for Best New Comedy.

An off-Broadway revival produced by The Actors Company Theatre opened on March 14, 2011, and ran until April 15, 2011.

== Musical adaptations ==
The play was adapted twice as a Broadway musical, each time with a different title and each time unsuccessfully. A musical adaptation titled Banjo Eyes, with music by Vernon Duke and lyrics by John La Touche, opened on Broadway at the Hollywood Theatre on December 25, 1941, and ran for 126 performances. The cast included Eddie Cantor, Virginia Mayo, Lionel Stander, and Jacqueline Susann.

Starring George Gobel as Erwin and Sam Levene as Patsy, who was reprising the role of Patsy he had created twenty-five years earlier, the second musical adaptation was titled Let It Ride (1961), which boasted a score by legendary songwriting team of Jay Livingston and Ray Evans, best known for creating three Oscar-winning songs, Buttons and Bows, Mona Lisa and Que Sera, Sera and two other movie songs that were smash hits, Silver Bells and Tammy; on television, the team wrote the Bonanza and Mister Ed theme songs. Directed by Stanley Prager and choreographed by Onna White, the Broadway musical opened at the Eugene O'Neill Theatre on October 12, 1961 and closed December 9, 1961 after running for 68 performances and one preview. The musical co-starred Barbara Nichols as Mabel Paula Stewart as Audrey and Ted Thurston.

== Film adaptations ==
A 1936 film adaptation released by Warner Bros. was produced and directed by Mervyn LeRoy and starred Frank McHugh, Joan Blondell, Guy Kibbee and Sam Levene who reprised the role of Patsy he created in the original Broadway production. Jacob Wilk, Warner's Eastern Story Editor acknowledged the film company invested $9,200 for a 50% stake in the Broadway production, also getting screen rights to produce a film version. The investment paid off handsomely as the investment was made before the Broadway production opened, returning $430,000 in gross profit from royalties from the original Broadway and touring productions.

A 1957 German language film adaptation, Drei Mann auf einem Pferd, starred Walter Giller and Nadja Tiller.

A 1969 French language film adaptation, Trois Hommes sur un cheval, was written and directed by Marcel Moussy.

In 1989, a film version, titled Let It Ride with the same basic plot—though purportedly based on a novel— was adapted for an American produced screen comedy starring Richard Dreyfuss.

== USO tours ==
The play was mounted in two USO tours playing 200 shows to 120,000 servicemen, the first legitimate U.S. theatrical production mounted overseas. Due to security, the USO cast was reduced from 12 to 7 without losing a minute of running dialogue. According to a May 26, 1945 Billboard interview, Sam Levene, who starred in the role of Patsy, said, "the G.I.s' gratefulness is absolutely embarrassing. They express it not only by applause but by meeting you personally and giving you objects which they have fought and bled for. They lose sight of the fact that they are the ones fighting the war."

== Television adaptations ==
An early televised version of the play aired over NBC's experimental station W2XBS on November 24, 1939.

The play, starring Hiram Sherman, was presented by Prudential Family Playhouse on November 21, 1950.

Orson Bean starred in a Broadway Television Theatre production on April 21, 1952, which was his TV debut.

On April 18, 1957, Playhouse 90 presented an adaptation directed by Arthur Hiller and starring Johnny Carson, Jack Carson, Mona Freeman, Carol Channing, Larry Blyden, and Edward Everett Horton.

== Board game ==
In 1936, Milton Bradley introduced an Art Deco inspired Three Men On A Horse board game based on the 1936 Warners Bros. film. Designed so it could be played by two to six players, the game included miniature horses and men, a two part race track and dice. Each player begins the game with three horses with three men, a player on each horse. The race begins at the starting gate where each player has three horses along with three men, one man on each horse and the first player who crosses the finish line with all three men on all their horses wins.
