= Treasury Men in Action =

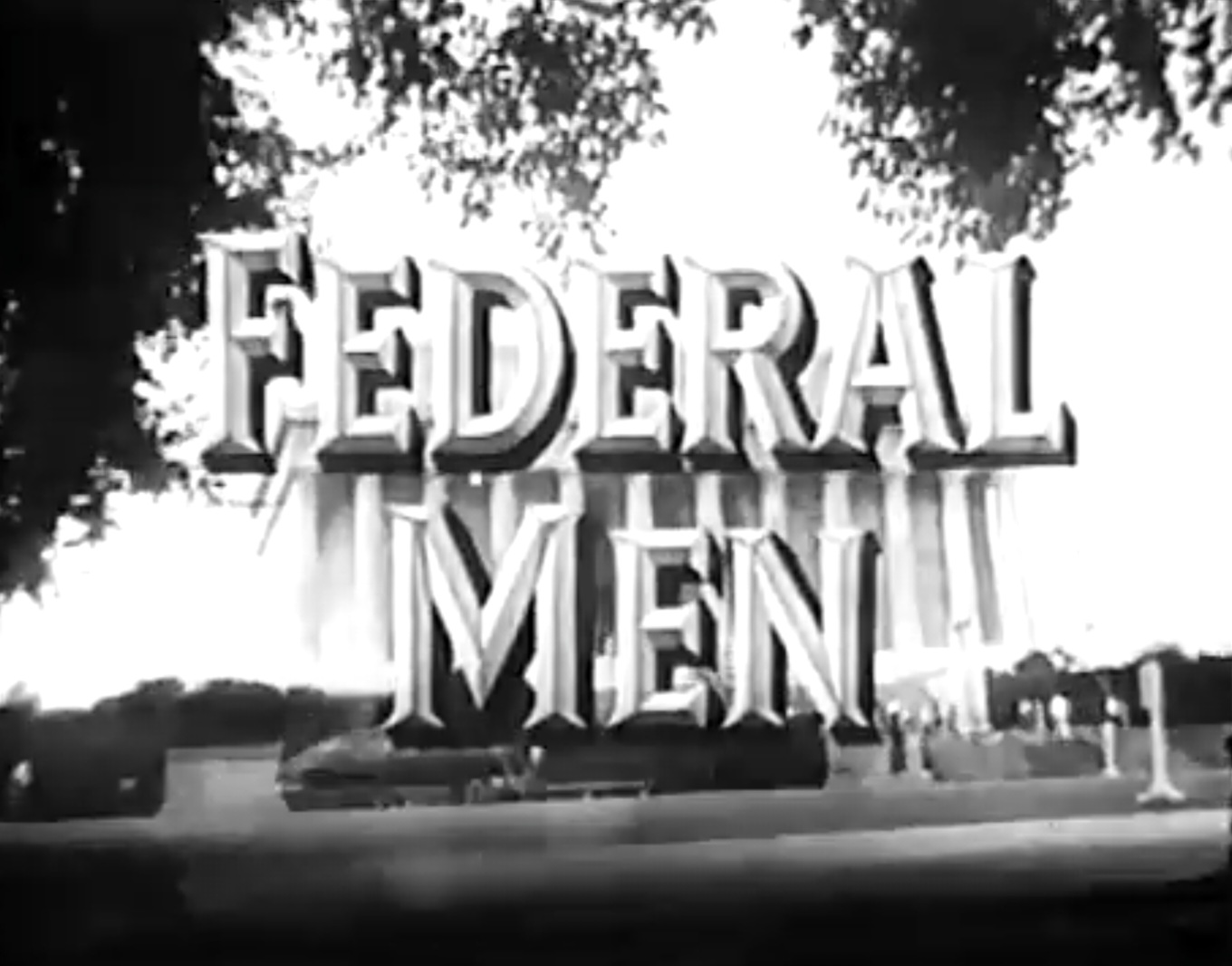
- Also known as: Federal Men
- Genre: Crime drama
- Directed by: William Beaudine; Leigh Jason
- Starring: Walter Greaza; Ross Martin; Tom McKee
- Theme music composer: Melvyn Lenard
- Country of origin: United States
- Original language: English
- No. of seasons: 5
- No. of episodes: 189 (list of episodes)

Production
- Executive producers: Everett Rosenthal; Jerome C. Robinson
- Editors: Irving Berlin; Everett Dodd
- Running time: 24 mins.
- Production companies: Combo-Stephens Inc. (1954-1955) (season 5); Prockter Television Enterprises

Original release
- Network: ABC
- Release: September 11, 1950 – July 1, 1955

Treasury Men in Action (also known as Federal Men) is an American crime drama series broadcast live and which aired from September 11, 1950, through April 1951 on ABC and then on NBC through 1955. The series stars Walter Greaza, Ross Martin, and Tom McKee.

== Overview ==
The series was an anthology drama dramatizing cases from one of the various law enforcement agencies that operated under the US Treasury Department. The host was Walter Greaza, who introduced each episode as "The Chief" of whichever agency was featured in a given episode. Counterfeiters, tax evaders, smugglers, narcotics traffickers, and other federal offenders whose crimes fell within the jurisdiction of Treasury were pursued. Cases from the files of the US Secret Service, the Customs Bureau. the Alcohol Tax Unit, the Intelligence Division of the Internal Revenue Service, and the Federal Bureau of Narcotics were dramatized.

Other actors who appeared in this series included Audrey Christie, Claude Akins, Charles Bronson, Jesse White, James Dean, Vivi Janiss, Carolyn Jones, and Harry Lauter.

Treasury Men in Action finished at #27 in the Nielsen ratings for the 1952–1953 season and #15 for 1953–1954. It appeared in reruns under the title of Federal Men.

== Production ==
In an interview with Kliph Nesteroff, assistant director Arthur Marks stated the show was shot at the same time and on the same sets as The Man Behind the Badge.

Everett Rosenthal was the executive producer, with Robert Sloane producing the 1953–54 and 1954-55 seasons. It was directed by, among others, David Pressman, William Beaudine, Leigh Jason, and Will Jason.

Chrysler Motors and Borden's Instant Coffee sponsored the program.

Initially a live program, Treasury Men in Action switched to film in 1954.

== Episodes ==
Partial List of Episodes of Treasury Men in Action
Date	Episode
November 15, 1951	"The Case of the Curious Convict
December 20, 1951	"The Case of the Counterfeit Christmas"
December 27, 1951	"The Case of the Sinful Past"
