= New Mexico (film) =

1951 film

- Original film poster
- Directed by: Irving Reis
- Written by: Max Trell
- Produced by: Irving Allen
- Starring: Lew Ayres; Marilyn Maxwell
- Cinematography: William E. Snyder (as William Snyder)
- Edited by: Louis Sackin
- Music by: René Garriguenc; Lucien Moraweck
- Color process: Black and white
- Production company: Irving Allen Productions
- Distributed by: United Artists
- Release date: July 13, 1951 (New York)
- Running time: 76 minutes
- Country: United States
- Language: English
- Budget: $720,000
- Box office: less than $700,000

New Mexico is a 1951 American Western film directed by Irving Reis, starring Lew Ayres and Marilyn Maxwell and shot in Ansco Color.

== Plot ==
President Abraham Lincoln visits New Mexico in 1860 to discuss peace with Acoma, a feared and respected Indian chief. Lincoln presents the chief with a cane as a symbol of their friendship. After Lincoln's assassination Lt. Hunt is promoted for his personal assistance to Lincoln in arranging the truce. However, Col. McComb, a bigoted superior officer, and the dastardly Judge Wilcox are opposed to a peace treaty. When Hunt states his objection, McComb places him under arrest along with Acoma and some Indian braves and breaks the truce cane. Members of the tribe free them from jail, killing McComb and others in the process. Hunt takes command and cancels all travel in the region, angering a woman named Cherry who is planning a trip to Nevada. She arrogantly elects to leave anyway, as does Judge Wilcox, so a company of men led by Hunt accompanies them as an escort. The Indians attack, frightening the two women and burying the judge in the sand. Hunt is disgusted with Cherry's selfish attitude and confronts her. She becomes friendly with one of Acoma's sons, and when another uprising ends with fatal consequences for the Indian warriors and Hunt, she and Acoma's son are lucky to have their lives spared.

== Cast ==
- Lew Ayres as Capt. Hunt
- Marilyn Maxwell as Cherry
- Andy Devine as Sgt. Garrity
- Robert Hutton as Lt. Vermont
- Donald Buka as Pvt. Van Vechton
- Ted de Corsia as Acoma
- Lloyd Corrigan as Judge Wilcox
- John Hoyt as Sgt. Harrison
- Jeff Corey as Coyote
- Raymond Burr as Pvt. Anderson
- Verna Felton as Mrs. Fenway
- Ian MacDonald as Pvt. Daniels
- Peter Price as Chia-Kong
- Walter Greaza as Col. McComb
- Hans Conreid as President Abraham Lincoln (uncredited)

== Reception ==
In a contemporary review for The New York Times, critic Howard Thompson wrote: "'New Mexico' ... is a routine, perspiring United States Cavalry-versus-Indian affair that kicks up a lot of familiar desert sand in front of its only real asset, some magnificent natural backgrounds. If this sun baked drama does very little else, it is sure to send panting audiences galloping toward the lobby watercooler. ... Max Trell's script rambles so disjointedly and is trimmed with so many cliches of incident and dialogue that the picture sprawls all over the hard-bitten story idea instead of driving it home. And the whole thing has been pretentiously smeared in Ansco color which makes the cast, Indians included, look lobster-red. So, too will anyone who can't make that watercooler in time."
