= Seidman and Son =

1958 novel by Elick Moll

- First edition
- Author: Elick Moll
- Language: English
- Genre: comedy
- Publisher: G. P. Putnam's Sons
- Publication date: 1958
- Publication place: United States
- Media type: Print

Seidman and Son is a 1958 novel by Elick Moll, adapted by Moll into a 1962 play.

The story centers on Morris Seidman, a Jewish garment manufacturer in New York City, and his relationships with his wife, son, and daughter. The novel debuted at number 12 on the New York Times Best Seller list on June 15, 1958, and remained on the list for 15 weeks. After the success of the novel, Moll adapted it into a play that debuted on Broadway in October 1962 at the Belasco Theatre. The Carmen Capalbo directed production starring Broadway star Sam Levene ran for 216 performances through April 20, 1963. Sam Levene headlined and directed the one year U.S. national tour of Seidman and Son.

Moll also wrote two sequel novels, Mr. Seidman and the Geisha (1962), and The Perilous Spring of Morris Seidman (1972).
