= List of Treasury Men in Action episodes =

This is a list of episodes for the television series Treasury Men in Action, a.k.a. Federal Men.

== Series overview ==
Season	No. of episodes	Premiered:	Ended:
1	37	1950.09.11	1951.09.20
2	39	1951.10.04	1952.06.26
3	42	1952.09.04	1953.06.25
4	32	1953.08.27	1954.04.01
5	39	1954.10.07	1955.07.01

== Episodes ==
- Ep = Episode number by season
- № = Overall episode number

=== Season 1: 1950–51 ===
Ep	No.	Title	Air date
1	1	"The Case of Lupo the Wolf"	11 September 1950
2	2	"The Case of the Very Sick Man"	18 September 1950
3	3	"The Case of the Deadly Fish"	25 September 1950
4	4	"The Case of the Casting"	2 October 1950
5	5	"The Case of the Hot Money"	9 October 1950
6	6	"The Case of the Foreign Dollars"	16 October 1950
7	7	"Episode 1.7" *	23 October 1950
8	8	"The Case of the Terrible Twenties"	30 October 1950
9	9	"The Case of the Peculiar Rooster"	13 November 1950
10	10	"The Case of the Queen of Diamonds"	20 November 1950
11	11	"The Case of the Diamond Smuggling Doll"	27 November 1950
12	12	"The Case of the Uncovered Convict"	4 December 1950
13	13	"The Case of the Careless Junkman"	5 April 1951
14	14	"The Case of the Swiss Watches"	12 April 1951
15	15	"The Case of the School for Passers"	19 April 1951
16	16	"The Case of the Fox and Rabbit"	26 April 1951
17	17	"The Case of the Diamond Necklace"	3 May 1951
18	18	"The Case of the Curious Well Diggers"	10 May 1951
19	19	"The Case of the Crooked Genius"	17 May 1951
20	20	"The Case of the Terrible Trophy"	24 May 1951
21	21	"The Case of the Wrinkled Buffalo"	31 May 1951
22	22	"The Case of the Poor Little Gangster"	7 June 1951
23	23	"The Case of the White Cargo"	14 June 1951
24	24	"The Case of the Phantom Endorser"	21 June 1951
25	25	"The Case of the Bloody Mountain Laurel"	28 June 1951
26	26	"The Case of the Devil's Donkey"	5 July 1951
27	27	"The Case of the Sweet Tooth"	12 July 1951
28	28	"The Case of Formula CEA #5"	19 July 1951
29	29	"The Case of the Wild Blue Yonder"	26 July 1951
30	30	"The Case of the Boston Bachelor"	2 August 1951
31	31	"The Case of the Sparkling Doublecross"	9 August 1951
32	32	"The Case of the Widow's Last Love"	16 August 1951
33	33	"The Case of the Murder by Proxy"	23 August 1951
34	34	"The Case of the Hundred-Headed Hydra"	30 August 1951
35	35	"The Case of the Grateful Partner"	6 September 1951
36	36	"The Case of the Unbeatable Passer"	13 September 1951
37	37	"The Case of the Unsealed Lips"	20 September 1951

* The title of this episode is unknown.

=== Season 2: 1951–52 ===
Ep	No.	Title	Air date
1	38	"The Case of the Shorn Sheep"	4 October 1951
2	39	"The Case of the Phony Half"	11 October 1951
3	40	"The Case of the Careful Swindler"	18 October 1951
4	41	"The Case of the Deadly Garbage"	25 October 1951
5	42	"The Case of the Gifted Father"	1 November 1951
6	43	"The Case of the Friendly Doublecross"	8 November 1951
7	44	"The Case of the Curious Convict"	15 November 1951
8	45	"The Case of the Lonely Student"	22 November 1951
9	46	"The Case of the Automatic Killer"	29 November 1951
10	47	"The Case of the Delicate Racket"	6 December 1951
11	48	"The Case of the Oldest Racket"	13 December 1951
12	49	"The Case of the Counterfeit Christmas"	20 December 1951
13	50	"The Case of the Sinful Past"	27 December 1951
14	51	"The Case of the Deadly Formula"	3 January 1952
15	52	"The Case of the Educated Slug"	10 January 1952
16	53	"The Case of the Weak Link"	17 January 1952
17	54	"The Case of the Good Boy"	24 January 1952
18	55	"The Case of the Violent Artist"	31 January 1952
19	56	"The Case of the Ambitious Brothers"	7 February 1952
20	57	"The Case of the Dancing Bear"	14 February 1952
21	58	"The Case of the Frightened Foreman"	21 February 1952
22	59	"The Case of the Golden Map"	28 February 1952
23	60	"The Case of the Unlawful Spenders"	6 March 1952
24	61	"The Case of the Brotherly Love"	13 March 1952
25	62	"The Case of the Honest Thief"	20 March 1952
26	63	"The Case of the Million Dollar Wash"	27 March 1952
27	64	"The Case of the Still Waters"	3 April 1952
28	65	"The Case of the Vanishing Victim"	10 April 1952
29	66	"The Case of the Obedient Son"	17 April 1952
30	67	"The Case of the Hidden Profile"	24 April 1952
31	68	"The Case of the Hunted Hunter"	1 May 1952
32	69	"The Case of the Ace of Hearts"	8 May 1952
33	70	"The Case of the Numbered Days"	15 May 1952
34	71	"The Case of the Abandoned Street"	22 May 1952
35	72	"The Case of the Deadly Counterfeit"	29 May 1952
36	73	"The Case of the Sparkling Alibi"	5 Jun 1952
37	74	"The Case of the Fatal Souvenir"	12 Jun 1952
38	75	"The Case of the Foolproof Set-Up"	19 Jun 1952
39	76	"The Case of the Flowery Head"	26 Jun 1952

=== Season 3: 1952–53 ===
Ep	No.	Title	Air date
1	77	"The Case of the Unexpected Witness"	4 September 1952
2	78	"The Case of the Charitable Chiseler"	12 September 1952
3	79	"The Case of the Treacherous Heart"	18 September 1952
4	80	"The Case of the White House Green"	25 September 1952
5	81	"The Case of the Moonlight Murder"	2 October 1952
6	82	"The Case of the Doctored Evidence"	9 October 1952
7	83	"The Case of the Powdered Millions"	16 October 1952
8	84	"The Case of the Miserly Minter"	23 October 1952
9	85	"The Case of the Imperfect Past"	30 October 1952
10	86	"The Case of the Unkept Secret"	6 November 1952
11	87	"The Case of the Undercut Lace"	13 November 1952
12	88	"The Case of the Sugar Daddy"	20 November 1952
13	89	"The Case of the Artless Dodger"	27 November 1952
14	90	"The Case of the Little Big Shot"	4 December 1952
15	91	"The Case of the Uncleared Cargo"	11 December 1952
16	92	"The Case of the Weak Sister"	18 December 1952
17	93	"The Case of the Sticky Fingers"	25 December 1952
18	94	"The Case of the Unbroken Seal"	1 January 1953
19	95	"The Case of the Priceless Package"	8 January 1953
20	96	"The Case of the Gilded Cage"	15 January 1953
21	97	"The Case of the Troubled Ear"	22 January 1953
22	98	"The Case of the Watchful Dog"	29 January 1953
23	99	"The Case of the Shallow River"	5 February 1953
24	100	"The Case of the Cornered Man"	12 February 1953
25	101	"The Case of the Rolling Log"	19 February 1953
26	102	"The Case of the Little Sister"	26 February 1953
27	103	"The Case of the Well-Healed Lady"	5 March 1953
28	104	"The Case of the Eight-Dollar Scotch"	12 March 1953
29	105	"The Case of the Silent Partner"	19 March 1953
30	106	"The Case of the Timely Tip"	26 March 1953
31	107	"The Case of the Grand Slam"	2 April 1953
32	108	"The Case of the Contraband Fever"	9 April 1953
33	109	"The Case of the Sawed Off Shotgun"	16 April 1953
34	110	"The Case of the Cold Trail"	23 April 1953
35	111	"The Case of the Secret Sale"	30 April 1953
36	112	"The Case of the Rolling Stones"	7 May 1953
37	113	"The Case of the Neighbor Next Door"	14 May 1953
38	114	"The Case of the Easy Money"	21 May 1953
39	115	"The Case of the Beggarly Banker"	28 May 1953
40	116	"The Case of the Ten O'Clock Pass"	11 June 1953
41	117	"The Case of the Rock-a-bye Baby"	18 June 1953
42	118	"The Case of the Bloodshot Eyes"	25 June 1953

=== Season 4: 1953–54 ===
Ep	No.	Title	Air date
1	119	"The Case of the Hideaway Herd"	27 August 1953
2	120	"The Case of the Crooked Thief"	3 September 1953
3	121	"The Case of the Greasy Palm"	10 September 1953
4	122	"The Case of the Smoking Powder"	17 September 1953
5	123	"The Case of the Telltale Heart"	24 September 1953
6	124	"The Case of the Adding Machine"	1 October 1953
7	125	"The Case of the Old and the Frightened"	8 October 1953
8	126	"The Case of the Lonely Bride"	15 October 1953
9	127	"The Case of the Prosperous Pauper"	22 October 1953
10	128	"The Case of the Deadly Secret"	29 October 1953
11	129	"The Case of the Weak and the Strong"	5 November 1953
12	130	"The Case of the Endless Lie"	12 November 1953
13	131	"The Case of the Double Deal"	19 November 1953
14	132	"The Case of the Ready Cash"	26 November 1953
15	133	"The Case of the Self-Made Hero"	3 December 1953
16	134	"The Case of the Hard Bargain"	10 December 1953
17	135	"The Case of the Unlucky Gamble"	17 December 1953
18	136	"The Case of the Runaway Boy"	24 December 1953
19	137	"The Case of the Counterfeit Alibi"	31 December 1953
20	138	"The Case of the Neutral Corner"	7 January 1954
21	139	"Episode 4.21" *	14 January 1954
22	140	"The Case of the Honorable Men"	21 January 1954
23	141	"The Case of the Tailor-Made Money"	28 January 1954
24	142	"The Case of the Fraudulent Income"	4 February 1954
25	143	"The Case of the Forgotten Man"	11 February 1954
26	144	"The Case of the Three-Way Split"	18 February 1954
27	145	"The Case of the Hush Money"	25 February 1954
28	146	"The Case of the Pentagon Payroll"	4 March 1954
29	147	"The Case of the Thick Skins"	11 March 1954
30	148	"The Case of the Changing Heart"	18 March 1954
31	149	"The Case of the Sitting Duck"	25 March 1954
32	150	"The Case of the Waiting Diamond"	1 April 1954

* The title of this episode is unknown.

=== Season 5: 1954–55 ===
Ep	No.	Title	Air date
1	151	"The Case of the Lonely People"	7 October 1954
2	152	"The Case of the Still Waters"	14 October 1954
3	153	"The Case of the Gentleman Cheat"	21 October 1954
4	154	"The Case of the Tarnished Lady"	28 October 1954
5	155	"The Case of the Man Outside"	4 November 1954
6	156	"The Case of the One Way Ride"	11 November 1954
7	157	"The Case of the Little Tin Box"	18 November 1954
8	158	"The Case of the Green Feathers"	25 November 1954
9	159	"The Case of the Dangerous Dollars"	2 December 1954
10	160	"The Case of the Escaped Convict"	9 December 1954
11	161	"The Case of the Losing Gamble"	16 December 1954
12	162	"The Case of the Bad Bargain"	23 December 1954
13	163	"The Case of the Broken Bond"	30 December 1954
14	164	"The Case of the Careless Murder"	6 January 1955
15	165	"The Case of the Chartered Chiseler"	13 January 1955
16	166	"The Case of the Iron Curtain"	20 January 1955
17	167	"The Case of the Unfair Verdict"	27 January 1955
18	168	"The Case of the Fatal Error"	3 February 1955
19	169	"The Case of the Elder Brother"	10 February 1955
20	170	"The Case of the Princely Pauper"	17 February 1955
21	171	"The Case of the Swindler's Gold"	24 February 1955
22	172	"The Case of the Little Big Shot"	3 March 1955
23	173	"The Case of the Lady in Hiding"	10 March 1955
24	174	"The Case of the Tight Squeeze"	17 March 1955
25	175	"The Case of the Deadly Dilemma"	24 March 1955
26	176	"The Case of the Black Sheep"	31 March 1955
27	177	"The Case of the Avoided Taxes"	7 April 1955
28	178	"The Case of the Smuggled Heroin"	14 April 1955
29	179	"The Case of the Steady Hand"	21 April 1955
30	180	"The Case of the Only Son"	28 April 1955
31	181	"The Case of the Man Next Door"	5 May 1955
32	182	"The Case of the Stolen Watches"	12 May 1955
33	183	"The Case of the Man Trap"	19 May 1955
34	184	"The Case of the Ready Guns"	26 May 1955
35	185	"The Case of the Perfect Gentleman"	2 June 1955
36	186	"The Case of the Shot in the Dark"	9 June 1955
37	187	"The Case of the Betrayed Artist"	17 June 1955
38	188	"The Case of the Frightened Man"	24 June 1955
39	189	"The Case of the Slippery Eel"	1 July 1955

== Sources ==
- Treasury Men in Action at IMDb
