= Walter Greaza =

American actor (1897–1973)

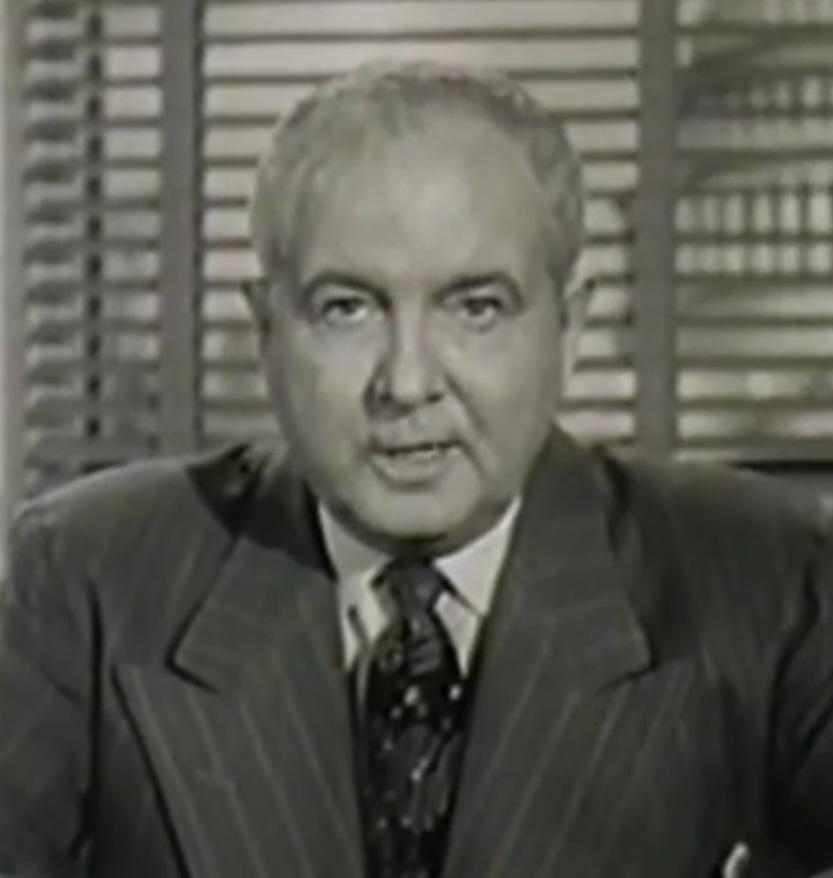
- Greaza in an episode of Treasury Men in Action (1955)

Shepherd of The Lambs
- In office 1953–1956
- Preceded by: Bert Lytell
- Succeeded by: Frank M. Thomas

Personal details
- Born: Walter Noel Greaza; January 1, 1897 St. Paul, Minnesota, U.S.
- Died: June 1, 1973 (aged 76) Kew Gardens, New York, U.S.
- Resting place: Ferncliff Cemetery
- Spouse: Helene Ambrose (1948)
- Occupation: Actor
- Known for: Broadway, Television

Walter Noel Greaza (pronounced Gree-zay; January 1, 1897 – June 1, 1973) was an American television, radio, stage and film actor.

== Biography ==
Greaza was born on January 1, 1897, in St Paul, Minnesota, to Albert Edward Greaza and Mary Elizabeth Frickelton. He studied business law and political science at the University of Minnesota in addition to acting with the university's drama organization. During World War I, he served in the U.S. Navy.

Greaza was appointed national administrative chairman of the American Guild of Variety Artists in 1942 and was assistant executive secretary of Actors Equity in 1943.

In 1948 he married Helene Ambrose. They remained wed until her death in 1966.

Greaza was Shepherd (president) of The Lambs from 1953 to 1956.

Greaza died at the Kew Gardens General Hospital on June 1, 1973, from cardiac arrest.

== Appearances ==
Greaza appeared in 8 films and 10 television programs between 1946 and 1965. His first film was The Story of Kenneth W. Randall, M.D. (1946) and his career ended with an episode in the television series The Defenders (1965).

On Broadway, Greaza appeared in Roman Candle (1960), Auntie Mame (1956), Temper the Wind (1946), The Overtons (1946), The Visitor (1944), Wallflower (1944), A New Life(1943), The Red Velvet Goat (1939), Sunup to Sundown (1938), To Quito and Back (1937), Sea Legs (1937), Now You've Done It (1937), All Editions (1936), Arrest That Woman (1936), If This Be Treason (1935), Ceiling Zero (1935), But Not For Love (1934), Judgment Day (1934), Wednesday's Child (1934), We, The People (1933), In Times Square (1931), Enemy Within (1931), and Love in the Tropics (1927).

Greaza's film credits include: 13 Rue Madeleine (1947), Call Northside 777 (1948), The Street with No Name (1948), New Mexico (1951), and It Happened to Jane (1959).

On television, Greaza starred as The chief on Treasury Men in Action (1950–55) and portrayed Winston Grimsley on The Edge of Night (from 1956 until his death). His other TV credits include: The Philco Television Playhouse (1949), Martin Kane, Private Eye (1951), Hallmark Hall of Fame (1956), The Phil Silvers Show (1958), and The United States Steel Hour (1961–62).

On radio, Greaza starred as Steve Wilson in Big Town. He also played Inspector Ross on Crime Doctor, and Russ in Lora Lawton and had supporting roles in The FBI in Peace and War.

== Filmography ==
Year	Title	Role	Notes
1946	The Story of Kenneth W. Randall, M.D.	Sidney Duncan	
1946	13 Rue Madeleine	Psychiatrist	Uncredited
1947	Boomerang	Mayor Swayze	Uncredited
1948	Call Northside 777	Police Capt. Norris	Uncredited
1948	The Street with No Name	Police Lt. Paul Staller	
1948	Larceny	Mr. Owens	
1949	The Great Gatsby	Kinsella	
1950	Mama	Carter Lusan	2 episodes
1950-1955	Treasury Men in Action	The Chief	Main role
1951	New Mexico	Col. McComb	
1956-1969	The Edge of Night	Winston Grimsley	Series regular
1958	The Phil Silvers Show	The Judge/Capt. Spencer	2 episodes
1959	It Happened to Jane	Crawford Sloan	
1961-1965	The Defenders	Magistrate Fred Moriarity/Judge	4 episodes
