= Dial 1119 =

1950 film by Gerald Mayer

- Theatrical release poster
- Directed by: Gerald Mayer
- Screenplay by: John Monks Jr.
- Story by: Hugh King; Don McGuire
- Produced by: Richard Goldstone
- Starring: Marshall Thompson; Virginia Field; Andrea King; Sam Levene
- Cinematography: Paul C. Vogel
- Edited by: Newell P. Kimlin
- Music by: André Previn
- Production company: Metro-Goldwyn-Mayer
- Distributed by: Metro-Goldwyn-Mayer
- Release dates: November 14, 1950 (Los Angeles); December 2, 1950 (New York)
- Running time: 75 minutes
- Country: United States
- Language: English
- Budget: $473,000
- Box office: $603,000

Dial 1119 is a 1950 MGM film noir starring Marshall Thompson as a deranged escaped killer holding the customers of a bar hostage. The film was directed by Gerald Mayer, a nephew of studio head Louis B. Mayer, who had previously directed screen tests and short films for MGM.

The number 1119 in the title is a reference to the police emergency number used in the film.

== Plot ==
Delusional mental patient Gunther Wyckoff escapes from an institution, intent on locating psychiatrist Dr. John Faron, whose testimony sent him to the asylum. Wyckoff arrives by bus in Terminal City, where he is confronted by the bus driver for stealing his Colt pistol. Wyckoff uses it to shoot and kill the driver.

Wyckoff unsuccessfully tries to locate Dr. Faron, first at his office and then at his home. As he leaves Faron's apartment building, he notices that the Oasis Bar across the street will serve as a good vantage point from which to observe the entryway to the building. The bar is tended by Chuckles and his assistant Skip, whose wife is in the hospital giving birth. Chuckles, seeing a news flash story on the TV, recognizes Wyckoff and tries but fails to reach a pistol behind the bar.

There are four patrons in the bar: the sluttish barfly Freddy, a young woman named Helen who is accompanied by an older man named Earl and newspaper reporter Harrison D. Barnes. Chuckles tries to phone the police, but Wyckoff shoots him dead as he is placing the call. Wyckoff orders the bar patrons to occupy one table, where he can keep an eye on them. The gunshot and Helen's scream attract the attention of a beat cop, who approaches the bar and is shot in the leg by Wyckoff. Bystanders rescue the officer and a call is made for reinforcements.

Wyckoff calls the police and demands that they keep their distance but deliver Dr. Faron, a police psychiatrist, to the bar within 25 minutes or else he will kill the hostages. The press begins TV coverage near the bar as the crowd of onlookers grows.

Faron is found and brought to the bar, but the police captain resents Faron's success for having defended Wyckoff and greatly reducing his sentence. As Faron pleads with the police to allow him to handle Wyckoff, they try to enter the bar undetected but Wyckoff hears them and then seriously wounds an officer. The police prepare to storm the bar with just two minutes left before Wyckoff's deadline, but Faron first enters the bar. He tries to reason with Wyckoff, who becomes agitated and shoots Faron dead.

The phone in the bar rings and Skip knows that it is the hospital calling about his wife. Desperate to answer, he fights Wyckoff. At the same moment, the police detonate an explosive charge and extinguish the lights. In the confusion, Freddy uses Chuckles' hidden gun to shoot Wyckoff. In shock, Wyckoff staggers outside and is killed by police gunfire. Kneeling over Faron's body, the police captain rhetorically asks, "How far does a man have to go to prove that he's right?"

== Cast ==
- Marshall Thompson as Gunther Wyckoff
- Virginia Field as Freddy
- Andrea King as Helen
- Sam Levene as Dr. John D. Faron
- Leon Ames as Earl
- Keefe Brasselle as Skip
- Richard Rober as Captain Henry Keiver
- James Bell as Harrison D. Barnes
- William Conrad as Chuckles, the bartender
- Dick Simmons as Television Announcer
- Hal Baylor as Lieutenant "Whitey" Tallman

== Reception ==
In a contemporary review for The New York Times, critic A. H. Weiler called Dial 1119 a "modest but effective adventure" and wrote: "[T]he study in terror and violence hews to its story line about a psychotic killer who holds a group of six hostages in fear and tren1bling, with pithy dialogue, realistic portrayals. and, oddly enough, a spot of humor directed, of all things, at television. ... 'Dial 1119' comes off with more suspense and conviction than is found in the average minor melodrama from the coast."

Critic Philip K. Scheuer of the Los Angeles Times wrote: "Neither John Monks Jr.'s screen play nor Gerald Mayer's direction does much to foster the illusion of reality in this, despite the absence of a music score. In fact, music might have helped to relieve the monotony. What suspense there is develops in spite, as it were, of a feeling of general awkwardness."

Writing in the New York Daily News, Kate Cameron noted: "[T]he action is not as spine-tingling as it might have been. Whenever a scene reaches a suspenseful climax, a sociological note is injected into the dialogue and the sense of excitement engendered by the situation rapidly evaporates."

Although the film was inexpensively produced, it only earned $402,000 in the U.S. and Canada and $201,000 elsewhere, resulting in a loss of $148,000.

== Home media ==
Warner Bros. released the film on DVD on July 13, 2010 in its Film Noir Classic Collection, Vol. 5.
