= It Happened to Jane =

1959 film by Richard Quine

- Movie poster
- Directed by: Richard Quine
- Screenplay by: Norman Katkov
- Story by: Norman Katkov; Max Wilk
- Produced by: Richard Quine; Martin Melcher (executive producer)
- Starring: Doris Day; Jack Lemmon; Ernie Kovacs; Steve Forrest
- Cinematography: Charles Lawton Jr.
- Edited by: Charles Nelson
- Music by: George Duning
- Color process: Eastmancolor
- Production company: Arwin Productions
- Distributed by: Columbia Pictures
- Release date: August 5, 1959
- Running time: 97 minutes
- Country: United States
- Language: English
- Box office: $1.7 million (est. US/ Canada rentals)

It Happened to Jane is a 1959 American romantic comedy film starring Doris Day, Jack Lemmon and Ernie Kovacs. It was directed by Richard Quine and written by Norman Katkov and Max Wilk. The film was coproduced by Quine and Day's husband Martin Melcher.

The film was re-released in 1961 under the title Twinkle and Shine.

== Plot ==
In May 1959, in the town of Cape Anne, Maine, an error by the E&P railroad company causes the death of 300 lobsters shipped by entrepreneur Jane Osgood, who runs a business supplying lobsters to restaurants. Jane, a widow with two children, asks her lifelong friend and lawyer George Denham to seek compensation from the railroad after her customer cancels all future orders.

At the E&P office in New York City, an executive by the name of Harry Foster Malone learns about the lawsuit. The spoilage had occurred as a direct result of his budget cuts. Malone sends two of his employees, Crawford Sloan and Selwyn Harris, to Cape Anne to deal with the situation. They offer Jane $700 in compensation, but she refuses because the amount does not cover the cost of lost future orders and the damage to her own business's reputation. Jane wins in court, but George must file a writ of execution to force payment and take possession of the train, Old 97, in lieu of payment.

Jane is interviewed by a local reporter, who then calls the Daily Mirror in New York. Top reporter Larry Hall is sent to Cape Anne for the story. Television stations carry the story and interview Jane. Mr. Malone retaliates by charging Jane rent for the siding on which Old 97 is sitting. Jane and George sing "Be Prepared" to a pack of local Cub Scouts at a picnic.

Jane travels to New York City to appear on network television, including the game show I've Got a Secret. Fearful of bad publicity, Mr. Malone finally relents, cancels the rent and gives Jane the train.

George becomes jealous when he learns that Larry is attracted to Jane and has proposed marriage to her. Jane receives telegrams of support from the public, and her former customer now promises to continue doing business with her.

Back in Cape Anne during a packed town meeting, Jane learns that Malone has ordered all of his trains to bypass the town and has given Jane 48 hours to remove Old 97 from his track. With no train service, the local merchants cannot receive their merchandise. Jane runs away and George, in an impassioned speech, scolds the townspeople for turning against her.

Realizing that using Old 97 is the only way to deliver lobsters, Jane and George persuade the townspeople to fill the train's tender with coal from their homes. George recruits his uncle Otis, a retired E&P engineer, to engineer the train. Jane, with her children and George, deliver the lobsters to their customers in several distant towns. Mr. Malone tries to delay them even as several of his office staff resign in disgust. Jane becomes upset at the roundabout route that Mr. Malone is forcing them to take. Eventually the coal is exhausted, stopping Old 97 and blocking railroad traffic.

Mr. Malone arrives by helicopter after hearing that the train is stalled. Jane scolds him for his actions and he finally agrees to her demands. Jane and George ask Mr. Malone to board the train so that he does not cause any more trouble. He finally shows his good side by helping to shovel coal. Larry and a photographer are in town when the train arrives. George kisses Jane in front of Larry, and she agrees to marry George and remain in Cape Anne. After the wedding, as George is being inaugurated as a selectman, a badly needed fire engine approaches the town, as it's a present from Mr. Harry Malone.

== Cast ==
- Doris Day as Jane Osgood
- Jack Lemmon as George Denham
- Ernie Kovacs as Harry Foster Malone
- Steve Forrest as Larry Hall
- Teddy Rooney as Billy Osgood
- Gina Gillespie as Betty Osgood
- Russ Brown as Uncle Otis Denham
- Walter Greaza as Crawford Sloan
- Parker Fennelly as Homer Bean
- Mary Wickes as Matilda Runyon
- Dick Crockett as Clarence Runyon
- Philip Coolidge as Wilbur Peterson
- Max Showalter as Selwyn Harris
- John Cecil Holm as Aaron Caldwell
- Napoleon Whiting as Eugene The Waiter
- Gene Rayburn as himself, a reporter from WTIC-TV (uncredited)
- Dave Garroway as The Left Hand Host
- Robert Paige as The Big Payoff Host
- Garry Moore as I've Got A Secret Host
- Bill Cullen as Panelist
- Jayne Meadows as Panelist
- Henry Morgan as Panelist
- Betsy Palmer as Panelist
- Harry Stockwell as Passenger (uncredited)
- Ronnie Scott as Passenger (uncredited)
- Howard Wendell as Purchasing (uncredited)
- Jack Carter as Stenographer (uncredited)
- Terry Melcher (uncredited)
- Michael J. Pollard as Lloyd (uncredited)

== Production ==
Old 97 is based on the J-Class 2-8-2 steam locomotives that once operated on the New Haven Railroad. Old 97 was a common nickname for steam locomotives bearing the number 97.

The film was mostly shot in Chester, Connecticut, and some scenes were filmed in Southington, Plainville and Plainfield, Connecticut. The final scene, filmed in downtown Chester, is approximately one mile from the train station used in the film. The locomotive shown in the final scene was a wooden prop. Many Connecticut citizens were invited to be extras.

The producers had difficulty deciding on the film's title. It was initially titled Miss Casey Jones and then That Jane from Maine.

The film was rereleased in 1961 under the title Twinkle and Shine.

== Songs ==
- "It Happened to Jane", performed by Doris Day
- "Be Prepared", performed by Day
- "I've Been Working on the Railroad"

== Reception ==
The New York Times critic Howard Thompson wrote: "If the going is a little strident and bumpy at times, the brash merriment provides more than a reasonable share of chuckles. ... This strictly one-gag frolic is at its most disarming as a peppery close-up of small-town life ... It would be hard indeed to take offense at such a brashly friendly little picture. Most of it is fun."

== In other media ==
In January 1959, before the film's release, a paperback novelization of the screenplay was written by Marvin H. Albert and published by Gold Medal Books under the working title of That Jane From Maine.
