= Martin Kane, Private Eye =

American radio and TV crime drama series (1949–1952)

Martin Kane, Private Eye is an American crime drama radio and television series sponsored by United States Tobacco Company. It aired via radio from 1949 to 1952 and was simultaneously a television series on NBC from 1949 to 1954. It was the "earliest of successful cops-and-robbers series" on television.

== Radio ==
Martin Kane, Private Eye
- William Gargan as Martin Kane
- Other names: Martin Kane, Private Detective
- Genre: Radio crime drama
- Running time: 30 minutes
- Country of origin: United States
- Language: English
- Syndicates: Mutual (1949–1951); NBC (1951–1952)
- TV adaptations: Martin Kane, Private Eye
- Starring: William Gargan; Lloyd Nolan; Lee Tracy; Walter Kinsella; Nicholas Saunders; Frank M. Thomas
- Announcer: Fred Uttal
- Written by: Ted Hediger
- Directed by: Ted Hediger
- Produced by: Edward L. Kahan
- Sponsored by: U.S. Tobacco Company

Martin Kane, Private Eye began as a 1949–1952 radio series starring William Gargan in the title role as New York City private detective Martin Kane. It aired on the Mutual Broadcasting System Sundays at 4:30 pm from August 7, 1949, to June 24, 1951.

The program was developed by the Kudner Agency's Myron Kirk.

When the crime drama moved to NBC Radio on July 1, 1951, Lloyd Nolan took over the title role until mid 1952. Lee Tracy portrayed Kane for the remainder of the radio series, ending December 21, 1952.

Other members of the cast were Walter Kinsella as Tucker "Hap" McMann, Nicholas Saunders as Sergeant Ross, and Frank M. Thomas as Captain Burke. Fred Uttal was the announcer. Edward L. Kahan was the producer; Ted Hediger was the director and writer.

The radio episodes aired between 1949 and 1952 were not merely audio rebroadcasts of the television show, but original episodes produced for the radio medium. Only 29 radio broadcasts are known to exist.

The program was sponsored by Old Briar pipe tobacco and Encore and Sano cigarettes, all of which were products of U.S. Tobacco Company.

== Television ==
Martin Kane, Private Eye
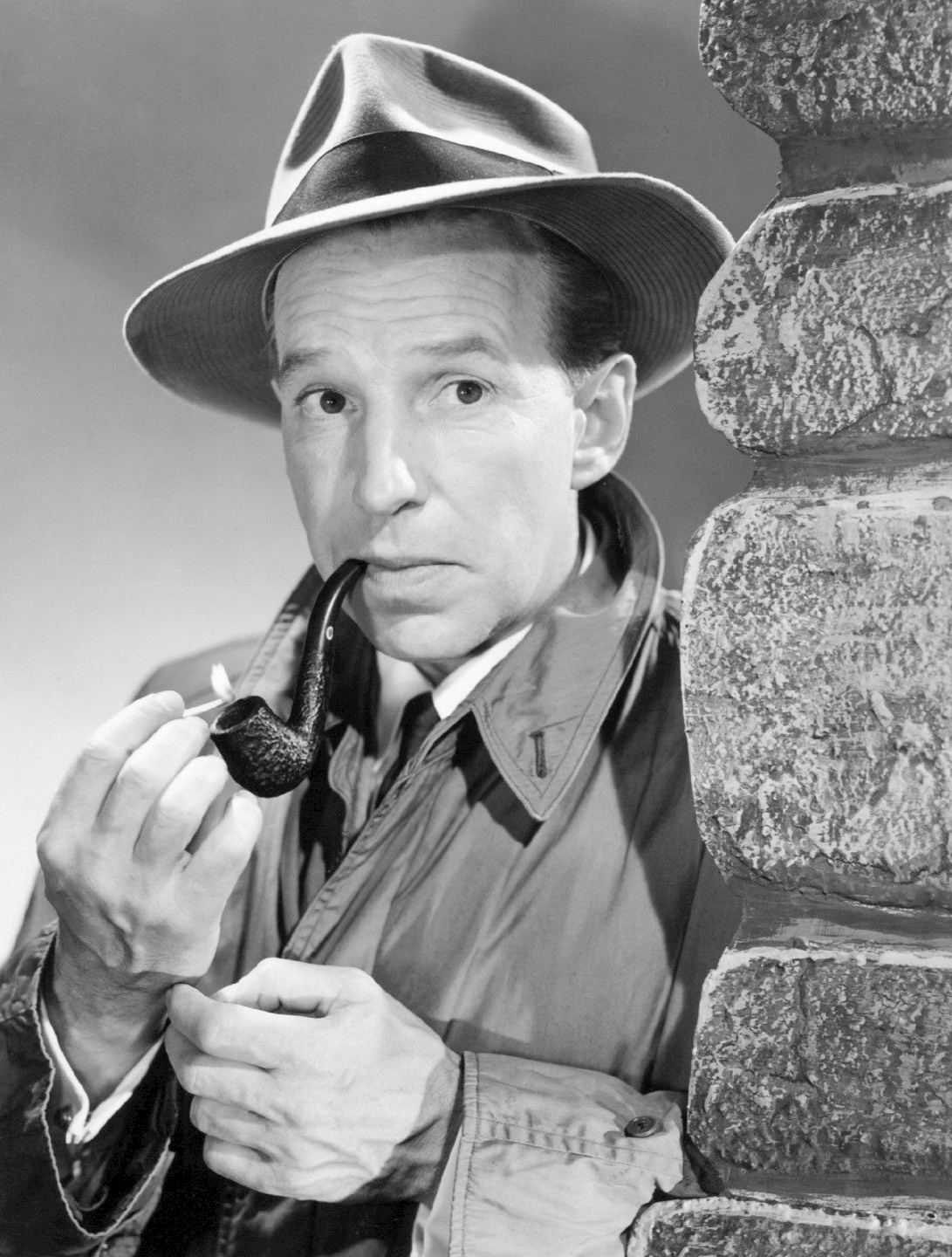
- Lloyd Nolan as Martin Kane
- Genre: Television crime drama
- Directed by: Frank Burns
- Starring: William Gargan; Lloyd Nolan; Lee Tracy; Mark Stevens; Walter Kinsella; Frank M. Thomas; King Calder; Nicholas Saunders; Walter Greaza
- Country of origin: United States
- Original language: English

Production
- Running time: 30 minutes 60 minutes in final season, 1953–1954

Original release
- Network: NBC
- Release: 1 September 1949 – 17 June 1954

Gargan, Nolan, Tracy, and Mark Stevens played the title role in Martin Kane, Private Eye on live television, airing on NBC from September 1, 1949, until June 17, 1954. The television version, also sponsored by United States Tobacco Company, integrated commercials into the detective drama by having Martin Kane enter his favorite tobacco shop, where he discussed pipe tobaccos and cigarettes with the tobacconist Happy McMann (Walter Kinsella), before leaving to continue the mystery narrative.

Frank M. Thomas portrayed Captain Burke, King Calder was cast as Lieutenant Gray, Nicholas Saunders portrayed Sergeant Ross, Walter Greaza portrayed Captain Leonard, Loring Smith portrayed Captain Evans, and Sergeant Strong was portrayed by Michael Garrett. Frank Burns, the NBC pioneer and father of actor Michael Burns, produced and directed shows written by Henry Kane and Lawrence Young. Charles Paul provided the music.

At the start and finish of the show, Kane was shown in shadow, lighting his pipe. Six episodes of this show have been released in the Best of TV Detectives DVD box set.

Edward Sutherland was the producer and director. Finis Farr and Frank Wilson wrote the scripts.

Gargan returned to the role for 39 episodes of the syndicated series The New Adventures of Martin Kane, premiering September 14, 1957, filmed in Europe for United Artists. In this version, Kane was based in London. After its original run, the series was resyndicated with the title Assignment Danger.

== Comic books ==
The radio-TV series had a 1950 tie-in comic book, Martin Kane, Private Eye, published by Fox and illustrated by Wally Wood, Joe Orlando and Martin Rosenthal.

It was also combined with rival detective show Mr. Keen, Tracer of Lost Persons and satirized by Harvey Kurtzman and Jack Davis in Mad magazine's fifth issue (June–July 1953), as Kane Keen! Private Eye.
