= Sam Levene =

American actor and director (1905–1980)

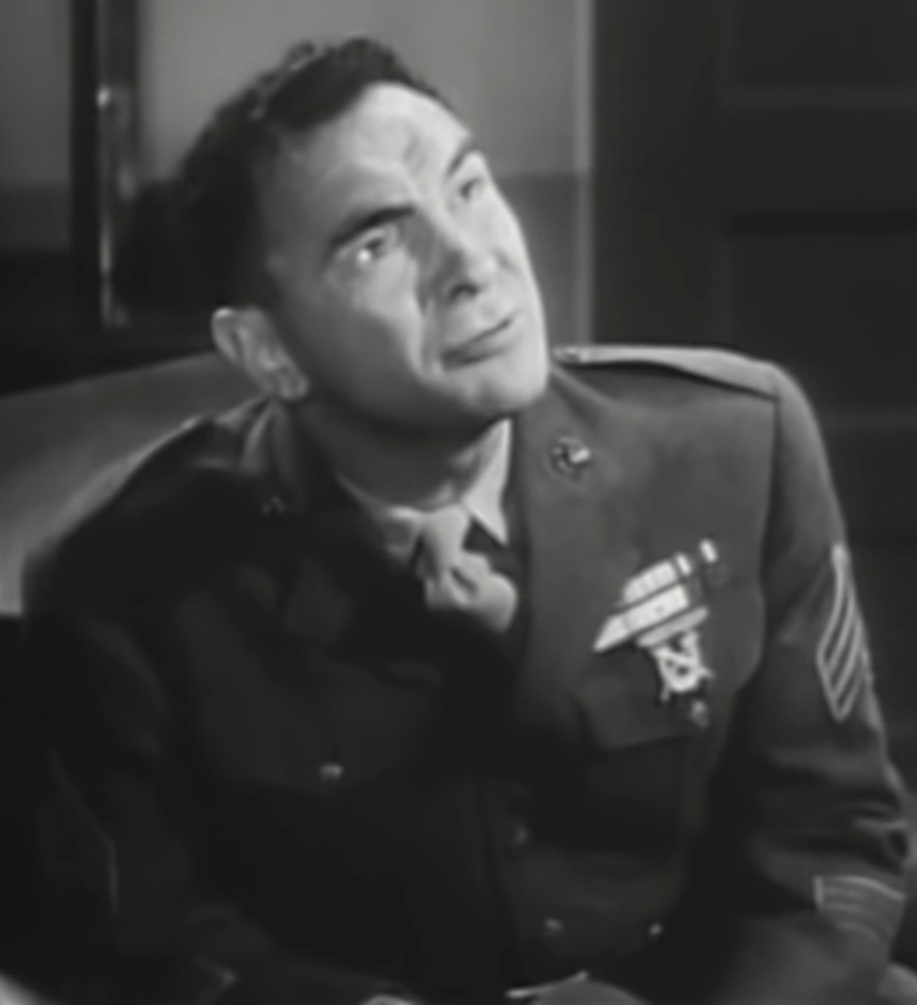
- Levene in Gung Ho! (1943)
- Born: Scholem Lewin; August 28, 1905; Shatsk, Russian Empire
- Died: December 28, 1980 (aged 75); New York City, U.S.
- Resting place: Mount Carmel Cemetery, Glendale, Queens
- Education: American Academy of Dramatic Arts
- Occupations: Actor; director
- Years active: 1927–1980
- Spouse(s): Constance Kane (m. 1953; div. 19??)
- Children: 1

Sam Levene (born Scholem Lewin; August 28, 1905 – December 28, 1980) was an American Broadway, films, radio, and television actor and director. In a career spanning over five decades, he appeared in over 50 comedy and drama theatrical stage productions. He also acted in over 50 films across the United States and abroad.

== Early life ==
Levene was born Scholem Lewin in Shatsk in the Russian Empire (present-day Belarus) to a Jewish family, the youngest of five children by a dozen years. His family immigrated to the United States when he was two years old. He grew up on the Lower East Side of Manhattan on Avenue D and 8th Street and attended Public School 64. In 1923, Levene dropped out of Stuyvesant High School. Since he had been in the class of Broadway for over five decades, the illustrious dropout was given a special award, his Stuyvesant High School diploma, in a 1976 ceremony held at New York's Princeton Club.

== Broadway ==
On April 20, 1927, Levene made his Broadway stage debut earning 60 dollars a week with his first Actor's Equity contract. A five-line role, Levene acted as District Attorney William Thompson in the original Broadway melodrama Wall Street, a play that only ran for three weeks at the Hudson Theatre.

In 1980, Levene's last and thirty-ninth Broadway credit was his starring role as Daniel Horowitz in the 1980 comedy Horowitz and Mrs. Washington directed by Joshua Logan which closed after a run of only 10 previews and six performances at the John Golden Theatre. Although the Henry Denker comedy was panned, Levene's star power and comedic performance enabled a five-month tour of Horowitz and Mrs. Washington which went on Christmas hiatus on Saturday December 13, 1980, and turned out to be Levene's final stage performance in Canada, just two weeks prior to his death on December 28, 1980.

Levene's Broadway career began with five years of steady employment in nondescript roles in ten Broadway plays, including a series of flops. One titled Solitaire (1929), was a Broadway play about a Coney Island midget that only ran four performances at the now demolished Waldorf Theatre, partially financed with a $500 last-minute investment from Levene's older brother Joe.

Emanuel Azenberg and Eugene Wolsk worked with Levene twice in two Broadway productions and two national tours; the first time as company managers when Levene replaced Alan King in the starring role of Dr. Jack Kingsley in the original Broadway production of The Impossible Years (1966), which Levene performed 322 times on Broadway and later headlined and starred in the national tour. Six years later, Azenberrg and Wolsk were lead producers when Levene was cast as Al Lewis opposite Jack Albertson as Willie Clark to co-star in Neil Simon's The Sunshine Boys (1972); after performing the role of Al Lewis 466 times in the original Broadway production, Levene and Albertson headlined the subsequent national tour. In his December 21, 1972, review of the original Broadway production of The Sunshine Boys in The New York Times, theatre critic Clive Barnes wrote, "Jack Albertson as the heart-stricken comic never puts a line wrong. He is always pathetic but never enough to make you cry. Lovely. His acerbic partner, Sam Levene, is as tough as vintage chewing gum, and yet with a sort of credible lovability."

== Theatrical career ==
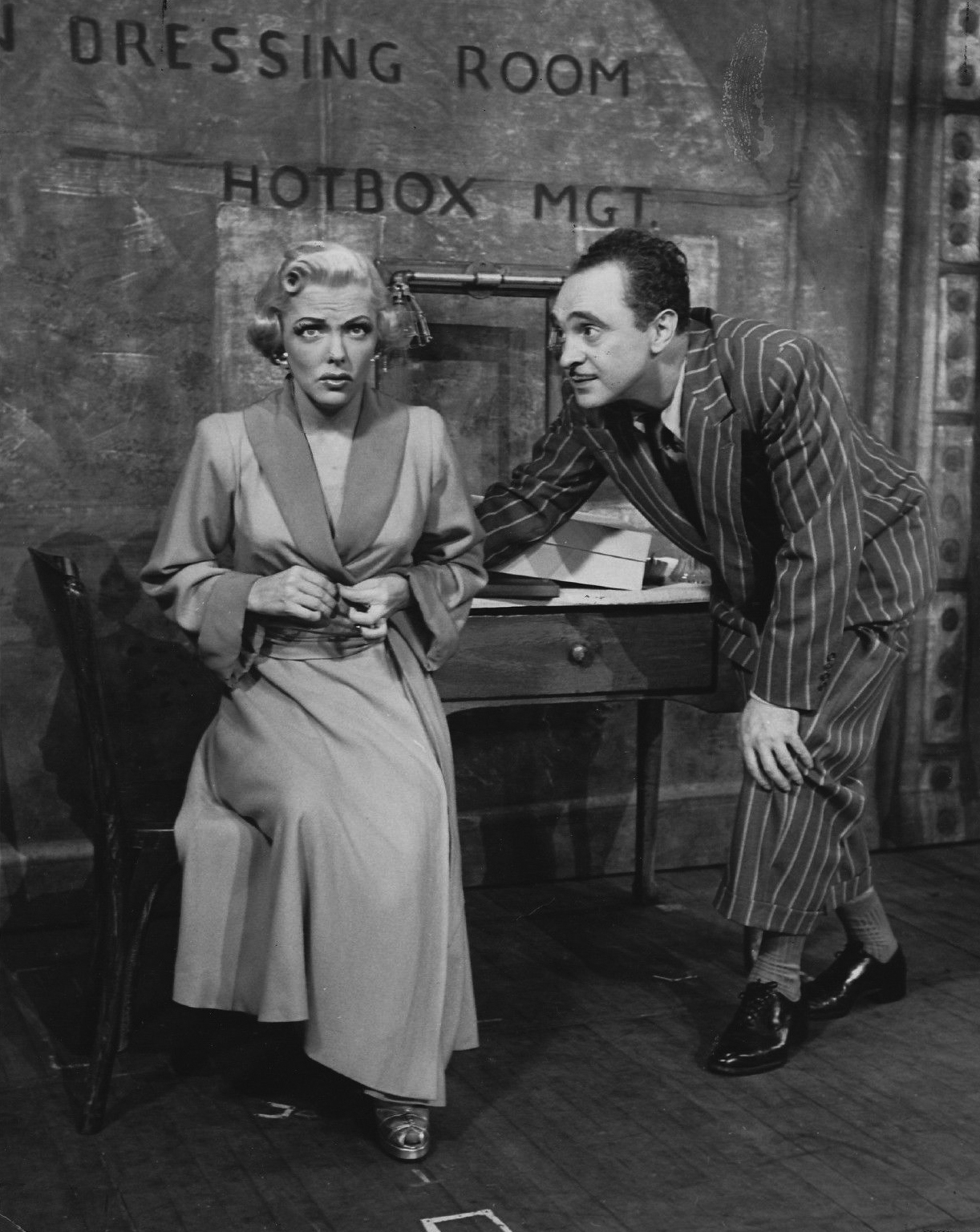
Vivian Blaine as Miss Adelaide and Sam Levene as Nathan Detroit in the original 1950 Broadway production of Guys and Dolls

Levene appeared in over 50 theatrical stage productions in the United States and abroad. A master of farce and comedy, Levene was equally effective in drama as well. Levene's Broadway credits include performances in 39 Broadway productions, 33 of which were performances Levene created in the original Broadway productions, and a 10-month USO tour.

Over his 54-year Broadway career, Levene performed in 39 Broadway productions at 29 different Broadway Theaters, and at some Theaters, several times. Levene performed over 1,600 times at the now demolished Playhouse Theater in four original Broadway productions, three of which Levene had starring roles after first appearing in Street Scene (1929), Three Men on a Horse (1935), Make a Million (1958) and The Impossible Years (1966). In a 1976 interview with Tom McMorrow for the New York Daily News.

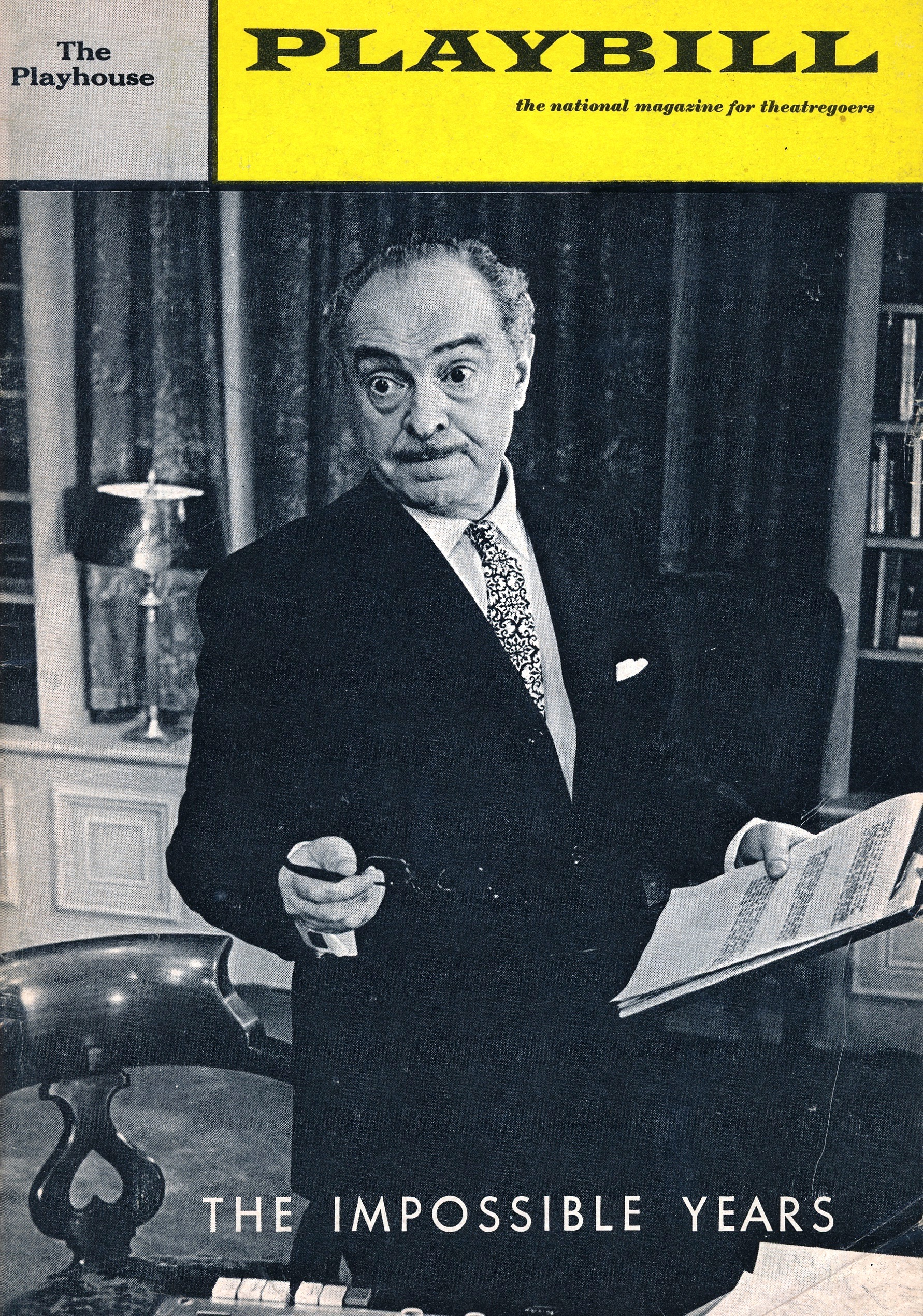
Playbill cover of Sam Levene as Dr. Jack Kingsley in the original Broadway production of The Impossible Years, a role he performed 322 times

Levene's Broadway credits include starring roles in three Broadway revivals, portraying businessmen Boss Mangan in George Bernard Shaw's Heartbreak House (1959) directed by Harold Clurman, recreating his original Broadway performance as Patsy, the racetrack gambler originated three decades earlier, in the acclaimed all-star Broadway revival of the smash hit farce Three Men on a Horse (1969) and performing the role of veteran theatre producer Oscar Wolfe in the all-star (1975–1976) Broadway revival of George S. Kaufman and Edna Ferber's The Royal Family (1975) directed by Ellis Rabb; the production was filmed for the series Great Performances on November 9, 1977.

Levene starred in two major UK productions; in 1953, he recreated his original Broadway performance as Nathan Detroit in the first UK production of Guys and Dolls which opened at The Coliseum a few days before the 1953 Coronation which had a run of 553 performances. In 1954, Sam Levene originated the role of Horace Vandergelder in the world premiere production of Thornton Wilder's The Matchmaker (1954), initially at the Edinburgh Festival in Scotland.

Levene originated the "craps-shooter extraordinaire" Nathan Detroit in the American musical Guys and Dolls on the Great White Way in the original 1950 Broadway production directed by the inimitable George S. Kaufman. Levene has been synonymous with the role of Nathan Detroit for seven decades; Guys and Dolls book co-author Abe Burrows specifically crafted the role of Nathan Detroit around and for Levene who signed for the project long before Burrows ever wrote a single word of dialogue, a similar break Burrows said he had when he wrote Cactus Flower for Lauren Bacall. In Honest, Abe: Is There Really No Business Like Show Business?, Burrows recalled: "I had the sound of their voices in my head. I knew the rhythm of their speech and it helped make the dialogue sharper and more real." Burrows had the advantage of writing dialogue built around Sam Levene's New York Jewish cadences. The creative talent of Guys and Dolls agreed Levene was perfect for the role of Nathan Detroit (Damon Runyon had been one of Levene's fans). Frank Loesser agreed it was easier adjusting the music to Levene's limitations than substituting a better singer who couldn't act. Levene is the reason the lead role of Nathan Detroit has one major song, the duet "Sue Me".

Hundreds of productions of Guys and Dolls are staged annually and Sam Levene's comedic performance as Nathan Detroit still makes headlines, largely because it became the gold standard classic. Frank Rich, Chief Theatre Critic, The New York Times, like most critics, lauded the 1992 Guys and Dolls revival directed by Jerry Zaks stating: "this is an enchanting rebirth of the show that defines Broadway dazzle." However, regarding Nathan Lane's performance as Nathan Detroit, Frank Rich observed, "The supremely gifted actor Nathan Lane does not remotely echo the first Nathan Detroit, Sam Levene, for whose New York Jewish cadences the role was written. Mr. Lane is more like a young Jackie Gleason and usually funny in his own right, though expressions like 'all right, already' and 'so nu?' do not fall trippingly from his tongue." Los Angeles Times Critic Emeritus Sylvie Drake reviewed the 1993 Guys and Dolls touring production also directed by Zaks at the Hollywood Pantages Theatre had a similar observation, comparing David Garrison's portrayal of Nathan Detroit to Sam Levene's original 1950 Broadway performance, writing: "The wiry Garrison's Detroit physically harks back more to the 1950 original played by Sam Levene, than to Nathan Lane, who played the role on Broadway last year. But unlike Levene, Garrison doesn't come across down, dirty or gritty. Knowing this actor's talent, one finds his amiable New York gangster surprisingly bloodless and almost genteel."

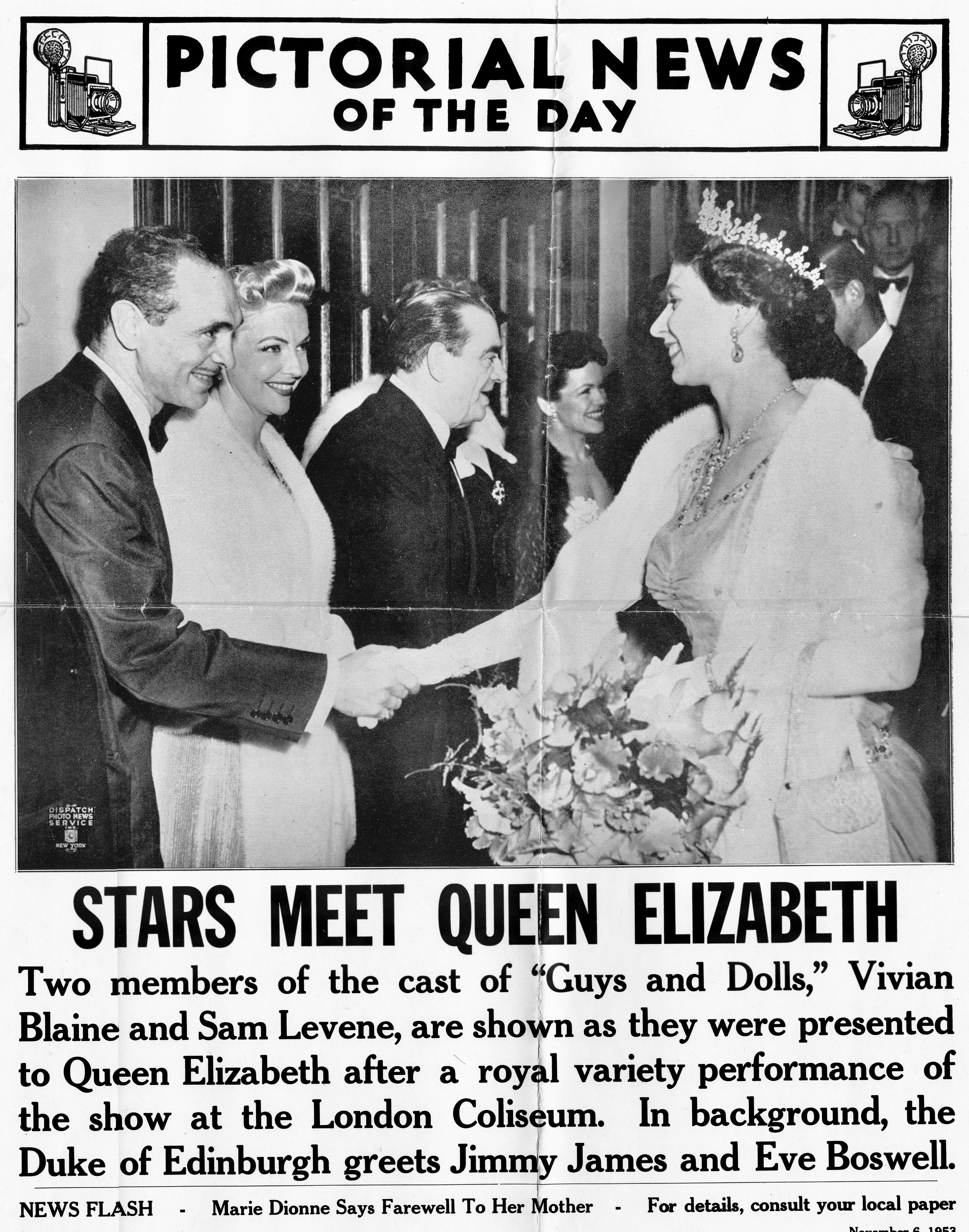
Vivian Blaine and Sam Levene meet Queen Elizabeth after Royal Command Variety Performance of Guys and Dolls, November 2, 1953

Levene performed the role of Nathan Detroit in Guys and Dolls over 1,600 times, initially 41 times in the 1950 pre-Broadway Philadelphia tryout where each performance was different, two years performing his classic role in the original Broadway production, a week's stint at London's Bristol Hippodrome before co-starring with Vivian Blaine for a year in the first UK production, six months performing the role twice daily in a one and half hour version of the Broadway hit at the Royal Nevada's Theatre-in-the Desert, the first Las Vegas production and the 15th anniversary six week production, three weeks in Mineola, New York and three weeks in Paramus, New Jersey in 1965.

Levene reprised his performance as Nathan Detroit on the Decca's original cast recording of the Broadway musical Guys and Dolls according to Variety, original cast album sales totaled 250,000 as of September 1, 1954. Guys and Dolls composer and lyricist Frank Loesser specifically wrote "Sue Me" in one octave for Levene and structured the song so he and Vivian Blaine never sang their show-stopping duet number together; the son of a cantor, Levene was fluent in Yiddish: "Alright, already, I'm just a no-goodnick; alright, already, it's true, so nu? So sue me." Frank Loesser felt "Nathan Detroit should be played as a brassy Broadway tough guy who sang with more grits than gravy." Levene sang "Sue Me" with "such a wonderful Runyonesque flavor that his singing had been easy to forgive, in fact it had been quite charming in its ineptitude".

Alan Alda, son of Guys and Dolls co-star Robert Alda, recalls watching Levene perform Nathan Detroit while standing in the wings. In Never Have Your Dog Stuffed; And Other Things I've Learned, Alan Alda recalls, "Watching Sam Levene was thrilling. He could ride a moment as if a wild animal. New meanings occurred to him on the spot. Not only did he play the same lines differently every night, but the laughs rolled in from the audience in different places. How did he do it? This kind of spontaneity and this utter commitment to the moment became what I wanted to have. As good as my father was, what I was seeing as they played together a few feet away was the difference between burlesque and theatre, between performing and acting. I chose acting. I wanted to be Sam."

For three decades, Levene reprised his role as Patsy from Three Men on a Horse (1935) numerous times on stage, film, TV and radio; the first time when he made his motion picture debut in Three Men on a Horse (1936) directed and produced by Mervyn LeRoy; three times on radio, two USO tours playing 200 shows to 120,000 servicemen, the first legitimate U.S. theatrical production mounted overseas. Due to security, the USO cast was reduced from 12 to 7 without losing a minute of running dialogue. According to a May 26, 1945, Billboard interview, Levene said, "the G.I.s' gratefulness is absolutely embarrassing. They express it not only by applause but by meeting you personally and giving you objects which they have fought and bled for. They lose sight of the fact that they are the ones fighting the war."

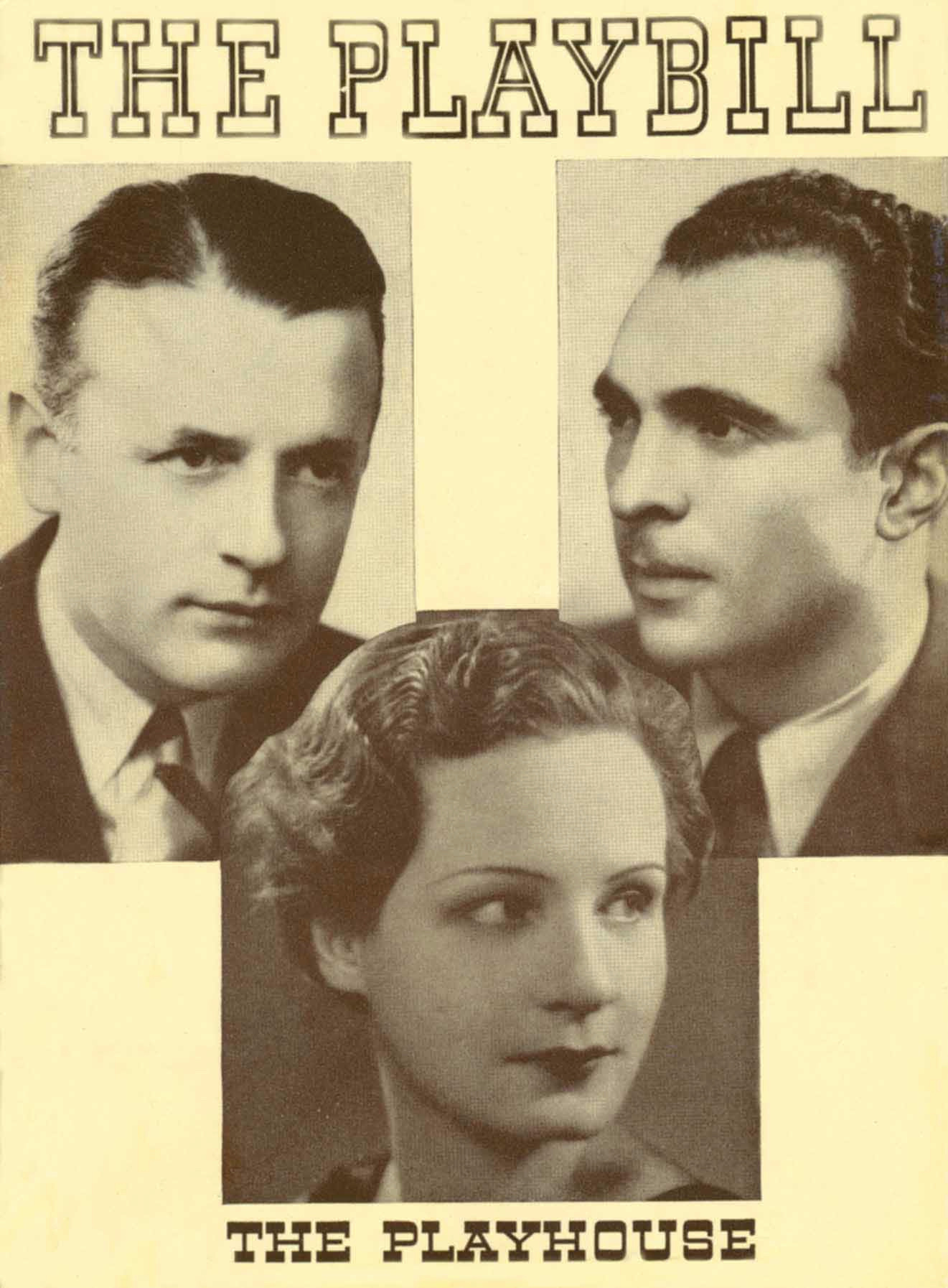
Playbill cover 1935 original Broadway production Three Men on a Horse at The Playhouse Theater starring Teddy Hart, Shirley Booth and Sam Levene

Levene as Patsy and Shirley Booth as Mabel reprised their original Broadway roles in two ABC radio versions produced by the Theatre Guild on the Air, the first adapted by playwright Arthur Miller aired January 6, 1946; the second aired June 1, 1947, with David Wayne as Erwin. Three decades after creating the role of Patsy in the Broadway production of Three Men On A Horse, Levene reprised the role of Patsy on Broadway in Let It Ride (1961), a Broadway musical which had an abbreviated run of 69 performances at the Eugene O'Neill Theatre. Levene performed the Let It Ride title song on the Let It Ride float in the 1961 Macy's Thanksgiving Day Parade. Levene performed the role of Patsy one last time in the 1969 all-star Broadway revival of Three Men On A Horse directed by George Abbott, the original Broadway director and co-author which was preceded by a national tour Levene directed, starring Levene as Patsy and Bert Parks as Erwin. In a 1969 review of the all-star Broadway revival of Three Men on a Horse, The New York Times theatre critic Clive Barnes wrote "Sam Levene originated the role of Patsy in 1935—by now it's his. Still looking like a man whose eyes have been allocated the wrong size eyelids, still mugging, double taking, offering his celebrated impersonation of an actor impersonating a character that would based himself on Damon Runyon, Mr. Levene is great. No one in the world plays Mr. Levene as he does, And what's more, no one ever will".

After making his Broadway debut 43 years earlier, Levene made his Off-Broadway debut, starring in Irv Bauer's A Dream Out of Time at the Promenade Theatre, Levene's only Off-Broadway appearance. In 1976, Levene was cast as Tubal, Shylock's business partner, in the Broadway production of The Merchant based on an adaptation of The Merchant of Venice but withdrew from the Philadelphia tryout after Zero Mostel, the play's star and Levene's lifelong dear friend died after first collapsing in his dressing room; Levene observed, "I was too close to Zero and a play we both loved, to do it without him." When John Dexter, the director, asked Levene if he would continue in the show, Levene told Dexter, "We just had one death; we don't need two." Understudy Joseph Leon replaced Zero Mostel for the Broadway production of The Merchant which closed November 19, 1977, after five performances. Levene's final Broadway credit was performing the starring role of Samuel Horowitz in the Broadway comedy Horowitz and Mrs. Washington (1980) co-starring Esther Rolle, directed by Joshua Logan. In 1980, Levene starred in a summer stock and national tour of Horowitz and Mrs. Washington co-starring Claudia McNeil.

== Film career ==
Nine years after making his Broadway debut, Levene was lured and moved to Hollywood in 1936 when he made his motion picture debut as Patsy in the Warner Bros. film Three Men on a Horse (1936) directed and produced by Mervyn LeRoy. Levene earned $1,000 a week to recreate on film his comedic Broadway role as Patsy he had played for seventy weeks in the original Broadway production of Three Men on a Horse (1935).

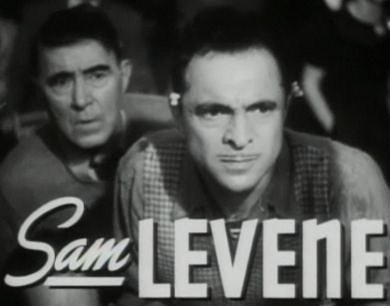
Trailer for Sunday Punch (1942)

Levene had 50 film credits. Levene worked with every major Hollywood studio over his five-decade Hollywood career; 14 of Levene's films were at MGM, which include two appearances as Police Lieutenant Abrams in the Thin Man series: After the Thin Man (1936) and Shadow of the Thin Man (1941), plus Yellow Jack (1938), The Shopworn Angel (1938), Married Bachelor (1941), Sunday Punch (1942), Grand Central Murder (1942), Whistling in Brooklyn (1943), I Dood It (1943), Shoe Shine Boy (1943 short), Dial 1119 (1950), The Opposite Sex (1956), Designing Woman (1957) and The Champ (1979). Levene appeared in five RKO films, including The Mad Miss Manton (1938); Sing Your Worries Away (1942); The Big Street (1942), A Likely Story (1947) and Crossfire (1947), the first B picture to receive a best picture nomination. Levene appeared in six Universal Pictures films: Destination Unknown (1942), Gung Ho! (1943), The Killers (1946), Brute Force (1947), Slaughter on Tenth Avenue (1957), and Kathy O' (1958). His final film was ...And Justice for All (1979).

Levene worked with Barbara Stanwyck in two films, in 1938, Sam Levene co-starred as Lieutenant Brent who "steals a few scenes with his great delivery of lines", in The Mad Miss Manton (1938), a screwball comedy that starred Henry Fonda; 31-year-old Stanwyck earned $60,000 for the film; 33-year-old Fonda earned $25,000, and 35-year-old Sam Levene earned $1,500 a week. The following year Levene appeared as Siggie in the film version of Golden Boy (1939), replacing John Garfield who performed the role in the original Broadway production of the Clifford Odets play about the brutality of prizefighting; critics praised the performance of William Holden as boxer Joe Bonaparte, but it was 27-year-old Lee J. Cobb as the senior Bonaparte and Sam Levene as Holden's taxi driver brother-in-law who walked away with the picture and the reviews.

== Film noir ==
Levene established himself as one of the stalwarts of film noir. He is one of several veterans of the genre who are graduates of the American Academy of Dramatic Arts, including Lauren Bacall, Hume Cronyn, Kirk Douglas, Nina Foch, Agnes Moorehead, Thelma Ritter and Edward G. Robinson. Levene's best known film noir credits include his performance as Samuels, the murdered GI, in Crossfire (1947) and as Lieutenant Lubinsky in The Killers (1946). The Killers features the movie debut of Burt Lancaster, who just a year prior was professionally credited as Burton Lancaster when Levene helped the former circus acrobat land a part in the original Broadway production of A Sound of Hunting starring Levene. In The Killers, Sam Levene plays Police Lt. Sam Lubinsky, a childhood friend of the Swede, played by Lancaster; Levene's co-starring role was fortuitous as he was credited in making Lancaster feel at ease in his motion picture debut. "It was lucky he was on the set with Burt Lancaster," maintained actor Jeff Corey "because Burt didn't feel too comfortable in his first film. Sam would frequently get on his ass. C'mon, c'mon. Do the goddamn thing. You pick up the piece of jewelry. Can't you do that and say the f....ing line? Lancaster was never offended. He appreciated, because he loved Sam; everyone did." When several Hollywood studios initially wanted to sign Lancaster, Levene, who was Lancaster's co-star in the 1946 Broadway melodrama A Sound of Hunting, agreed to represent him; eventually the two actors became lifelong friends. Together Lancaster and Levene fielded offers from David O. Selznick, 20th Century-Fox and Hal B. Wallis, who had a deal at Paramount Pictures, ultimately introducing Lancaster to Harold Hecht, who became Lancaster's long-time agent and Hollywood film production partner. Burt Lancaster and Sam Levene also worked together in two other film noirs, Brute Force (1947), directed by Jules Dassin, Lancaster's second film, which appears on several film noir lists and the acclaimed film noir Sweet Smell of Success (1957) included on AFI's Catalogue of Feature Films.

Other Sam Levene noir credits include: Dave Woods, as a newspaper reporter, "who gives a performance not to be missed who steals the show as a dirt digging journalist who is ultimately fighting for righteousness", writing hard-hitting articles attacking the police in Elia Kazan's crime film noir Boomerang (1947), Dr. John Faron, a psychiatrist in Dial 1119 (1950), Capt. Tonetti in Guilty Bystander (1950) and Howard Rysdale in Slaughter on Tenth Avenue (1957). Alan K. Rode observed "Slaughter on Tenth Avenue was bolstered by a terrific ensemble cast headed by Richard Egan, Jan Sterling, Julie Adams, Walter Matthau, Dan Duryea, Charles McGraw and Sam Levene, who performs yeoman work as a realpolitik Manhattan district attorney, forced to temper the hard-charging idealism of assistant Egan who inevitably triumphs in the end."

== Radio ==
For most of his early film and Broadway stage career, Sam Levene straddled an active schedule with starring roles in a range of productions on all radio networks, including comedic performances and skits along with dramatic and comedy roles in abridged versions of important theatrical stage productions and adaptations on leading series, often reprising roles he had previously played on the Broadway stage and on film. Levene co-starred with Orson Welles in two important adaptations of stage productions for Welles' The Campbell Playhouse, first as Lefty in Burlesque on February 17, 1939, and five weeks later, March 24, 1939, as Owen O'Malley, the John Barrymore part, in Twentieth Century. Levene starred in nine Theatre Guild on the Air productions; two radio versions of Three Men on a Horse, the first adapted by Arthur Miller aired January 6, 1946; the second June 1, 1947, with David Wayne joining the cast as Erwin. A third Three Men on a Horse production sponsored by Lady Esther for the Screen Guild Players aired February 28, 1944, with Levene as Patsy and Charlie Ruggles as Erwin. Other Theatre Guild on the Air radio appearances include performing the role of "Banjo" with Fred Allen as Sheridan Whiteside in George S. Kaufman and Moss Hart's The Man Who Came to Dinner. Levene recreated his original Broadway performance as Sidney Black, the loud-mouth producer, in Moss Hart's Light Up the Sky opposite Joan Bennett and Thelma Ritter for the Theatre Guild on the Air, April 16, 1951, a role he performed in a live performance on Ford Theatre on CBS TV.

Levene reprised his film role as Dave Woods, the reporter in Elia Kazan's Boomerang for Theatre Guild on the Air; and appeared as Moody, the fight manager, in Golden Boy by Clifford Odets opposite long-time friend and co-star June Havoc and Dana Andrews whom Levene had just worked with filming Boomerang. For Suspense Radio on CBS, Levene reprised his film role as Samuels, the murdered Jewish soldier in Crossfire, on April 10, 1948. Levene and Havoc worked with each many times in radio, film, theatre and television. In 1942, Havoc and Levene co-starred in the RKO film Sing Your Worries Away. In 1957, Havoc and Levene guest-starred on The Mother Bit in Season 9 of TV's Studio One series. In 1959, Levene and Havoc were guest stars in the Season 2 episode of The Untouchables, "The Larry Fay Story"; in a dramatic role, Sam Levene was nightclub owner and mob boss Larry Fay, accused of price fixing milk and June Havoc was Sally Kansas, Fay's lover, who also appeared as a lounge singer in one of Fay's nite clubs.

Levene frequently appeared on Fred Allen's Texaco Star Theatre in a sketch comedy segment known as "Allen's Alley". Sam Levene, along with 12 major Hollywood and Broadway stars including Helen Hayes, Fredric March and Ralph Bellamy, created 13 episodes of Lest We Forget, a series of radio programs that directly addressed prejudice and discrimination. Created by the Institute for Democratic Education and Boston University Radio Institute, Sam Levene starred as a cab driver who becomes in a hero in "Hey Cabbie", an episode that unabashedly addresses anti-semitism. Levene, along with Edward G. Robinson and Frank Sinatra, made a series of appearances in We Will Never Die, a memorial pageant dedicated to the victims of the Holocaust; performed around the country at major venues, including Madison Square Garden and the Hollywood Bowl. On a lighter note, Levene made a New Year's Eve appearance on The Big Show with his Guys and Dolls co-star Vivian Blaine on December 31, 1950; Levene performed a skit with Tallulah Bankhead who had declined an invitation to appear on Ken Murray's show so that she could obtain theatre tickets to Guys and Dolls.

== Jewish heritage ==
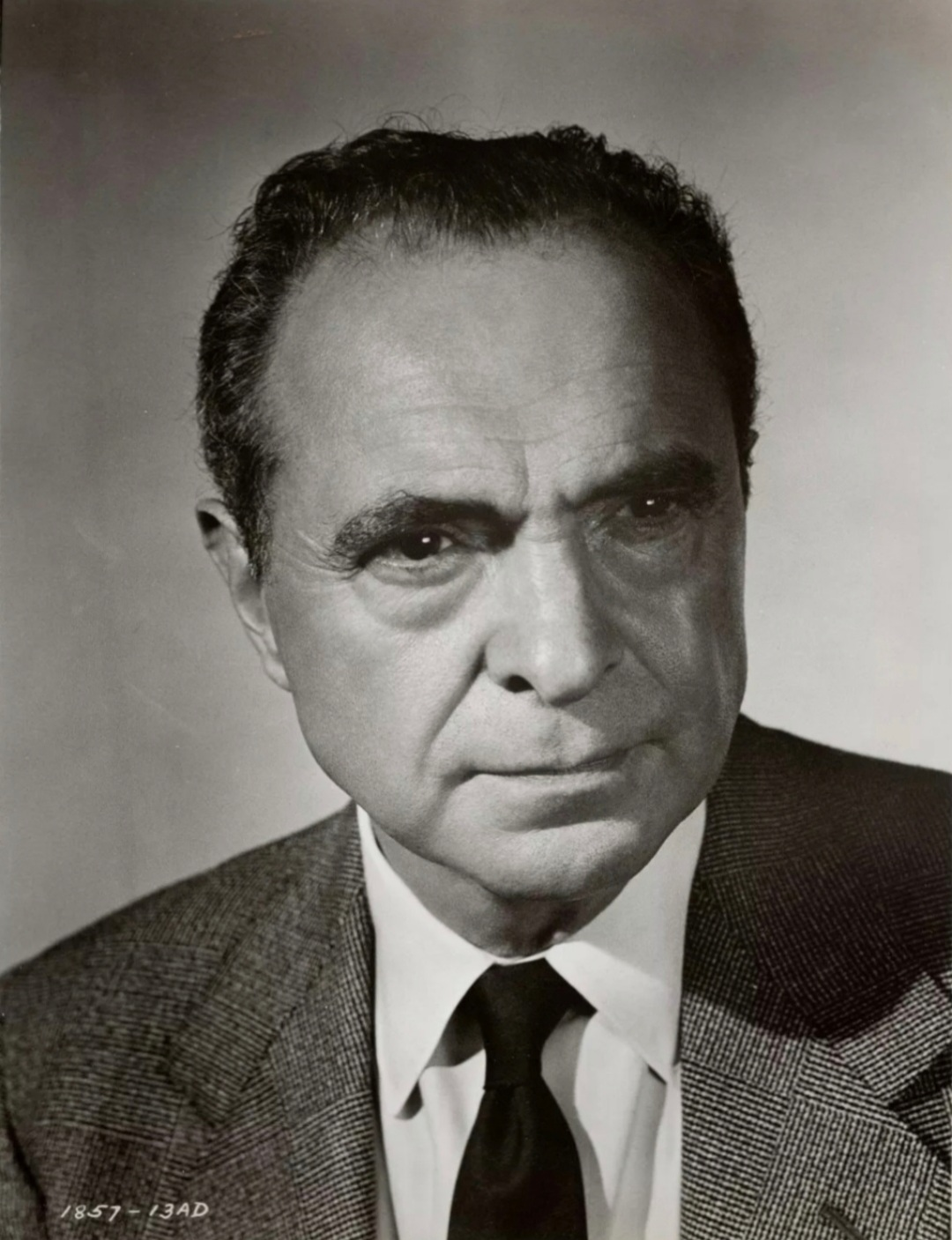
Sam Levene in Crossfire (1947)

Sam Levene was one of the few Jewish actors who played characters who had a Jewish name in the 1930s and 1940s; notably in After the Thin Man (1936) as Lieutenant Abrams, in The Purple Heart (1944) as Lt. Wayne Greenbaum, a level-headed, brave, New York-bred Jewish lawyer who is defender and spokesman for a group of eight aviators brought to trial when they are downed in Japanese-held territory; in The Killers (1946) as Police Lt. Sam Lubinsky; in Crossfire (1947) as Samuels, a Jewish civilian who was murdered at the start of the film; in a 1947 personal appearance, Levene said "Crossfire is a powerful denunciation of anti-Semitism and naturally I played the Jew and naturally I was killed." Cy Feuer, co-producer of the original Broadway production of Guys and Dolls (1950) said in a New York Times interview "Sam Levene was the ultimate Jew," referring to the original Nathan Detroit, "it was perfect casting. He created the character by living." Unanimous raves greeted Sam Levene for his portrayal of the skeptical but good-hearted Jewish doctor, Dr. Aldo Mayer, in the 1961 Broadway production of The Devil's Advocate.

Levene lost the role of Nathan Detroit to Frank Sinatra in the film version. "You can't have a Jew playing a Jew; it wouldn't work on screen," producer Samuel Goldwyn argued, explaining why he wanted Sinatra rather than Levene—who had originated the role—to play the part of Nathan Detroit in the film, even though film director Joseph L. Mankiewicz wanted Levene, the original Broadway star. Mankiewicz said, "If there could be one person in the world more miscast as Nathan Detroit than Frank Sinatra that would be Laurence Olivier and I am one of his greatest fans; the role had been written for Sam Levene who was divine in it."

Fordham University Professor of Music Larry Stempel, author of Showtime: A History of the Broadway Musical Theater, said if given a choice, he would cast Levene, who created the role on Broadway, as the ideal Nathan Detroit instead of Nathan Lane, who played the part in the Broadway revival, or Frank Sinatra, stating, "Musically, he may have been tone-deaf, but he inhabited Frank Loesser's world as a character more than a caricature."

== Caricatures ==
Over five decades Al Hirschfeld, considered the greatest caricaturist of the 20th century, created nine caricatures capturing seven original Broadway performances created by Levene, the first in 1935, the last 1975. A Hirschfeld caricature of Levene captures his performance as Nathan Detroit wearing his pinstripe suit designed by Alvin Colt in the original 1950 Broadway production of Guys and Dolls and published in The New York Times November 19, 1950. In 2000, the Guys and Dolls caricature included in The Museum of The City of New York exhibition "Guys and Dolls: The Fabled Musical of Broadway". In 2015, the caricature was exhibited in "The Hirschfeld Century" at The New York Historical Society. The first time Hirschfeld captured Levene was his Broadway performance as Patsy along with Shirley Booth as Mabel in the 1935 original Broadway production of Three Men on a Horse; a second caricature of Levene and Booth featuring the Broadway casts from Tobacco Road and The Children's Hour published in the New York Herald Tribune June 7, 1936, celebrates Broadway long-runs. Hirschfeld created two caricatures of Levene's critically acclaimed performance as Max Gordon, the shoestring producer, in the original 1937 Broadway production of Room Service, published in the New York Herald Tribune and The Brooklyn Eagle. Hirschfeld captured Levene's poignant performance as Al Lewis giving Willie Clark "the finger" in the original Broadway production of The Sunshine Boys published in The New York Times on December 13, 1972. Hirschfeld also captured Levene's original Broadway performances in Margin For Error and Light Up The Sky. Other notable caricaturists who memorialized Levene's stage performances include Sam Norkin, Al Frueh and William Auerbach-Levy. Al Frueh, who created caricatures of Broadway shows, mostly for The New Yorker for three decades until 1962, captured six of Levene's original Broadway performances, including Busch from the original Broadway production of Yellow Jack (1934), Patsy from the original Broadway production of Three Men on a Horse (1935), Sidney Black from the original Broadway production of Light Up The Sky, Nathan Detroit from the 1950 original Broadway production of Guys and Dolls; Boss Mangan in the 1959 all-star Broadway revival of Heartbreak House, directed and co-starring Maurice Evans, and Officer Finkelstein, the Jewish policeman, in the 1939 original Broadway production of Margin for Error. Over a period of four decades, William Auerbach-Levy (1889-1964) created 15 caricatures celebrating ten Sam Levene original Broadway starring performances including: Nathan Detroit in Guys and Dolls (1950), five caricatures; Patsy in Three Men on a Horse (1935), Officer Finkelstein in Margin for Error (1939), Pvt. Dino Collucci in A Sound of Hunting (1945), Sidney Black in Light Up The Sky (1948), Lou Winkler in Fair Game (1957), Sid Gray in Make A Million (1958), Odilon in The Good Soup (1960), Patsy in Let It Ride (1961), Dr. Aldo Meyer in The Devil's Advocate (1961), and Morris Seidman in Seidman and Son (1962).

== Personal life and death ==
Levene married Constance Kane in 1953. The couple had one son together, Joseph K. Levene, before their divorce. On December 28, 1980, Levene died of an apparent heart attack in New York City. He was buried in Mount Carmel Cemetery, Glendale, Queens.

== Awards ==
Nominated for the 1961 Tony Award for Best Actor in a play for The Devil's Advocate, Levene never received a Tony Award; by the time the Tony Awards were established in 1947, Levene had already created roles in 19 original Broadway shows, none Tony eligible, including performances in the original Broadway productions of Dinner at Eight (1932), Three Men on a Horse (1935), Room Service (1937) and Margin for Error (1939). In 1960, Levene was awarded the Actors Fund Medal of Honor, at the time, the second actor awarded the honor.

On April 9, 1984, Levene was posthumously inducted in the American Theatre Hall of Fame; his son, Joseph K. Levene, accepted the American Theatre Hall of Fame award from Dorothy Loudon who co-starred as Mabel with Levene in 1969 all-star revival of Three Men on a Horse.

In 1998, Sam Levene, Robert Alda, Vivian Blaine, Isabel Bigley and Pat Rooney, Sr. were posthumously inducted into the Grammy Hall of Fame for the 1950 Decca original cast album of Guys and Dolls.

In a 1996 New York letter to the editor, Sam Levene's son Joseph K. Levene, thanked film critic David Denby stating, "My father, the late great Sam Levene, has received many kudos illuminating his career as an actor, none recalled the passion for the theater more clearly than David Denby's comment in his review of Everyone Says I Love You: Sam Levene playing Nathan Detroit in the original Guys and Dolls couldn't sing a note but his gruff toneless outbursts could break your heart. Levene was not cautious and that made all the difference." Joseph added, "There were no Tony's in his career but thanks for the Denby."
