= Charles Paul (composer) =

American composer and organist

Charles Paul (August 23, 1902, in New York City – September 18, 1990, in Milford, Connecticut) was an American composer and organist, most known for his musical accompaniment on radio and television.

Originally providing musical accompaniment to such old-time radio programs as The Adventures of Ellery Queen and Young Doctor Malone, he transitioned to television in the 1950s. His music accentuated the TV version of Martin Kane, Private Eye with an organ and horn combo. His first known soap opera was Love of Life which he began accompanying in 1953. In 1954 he added The Secret Storm and the short-lived The Road of Life to his duties. By this time Paul had perfected a style that favored the organ, but was often coupled with piano for more intense scenes.

On The Secret Storm Paul began his practice of using "leitmotif" themes to underscore specific characters, such as his tune for matriarch Grace Tyrell (Marjorie Gateson) and his lament for her daughter Pauline Harris (Haila Stoddard). Paul continued this practice on Love of Life and his successive soaps.

It was in 1956 that Charles Paul began a stint as the organist for television's first thirty-minute soap opera, As the World Turns. Paul created character themes for Nancy Hughes (Helen Wagner), Pa Hughes (Santos Ortega) and Lisa (Eileen Fulton). He wrote motifs for opening scene shots that identified settings, such as Memorial Hospital and the Lowell, Barnes, Lowell & Hughes law firm. Paul also wrote the first theme song for NBC's Another World which was handled by other organists. Though he was not named in the credits, Paul provided the original scores to headwriter Agnes Nixon's ABC hits One Life to Live and All My Children under the auspices of Aeolus Productions.

In the summer of 1969, many behind-the-scenes shifts occurred at CBS soaps. As a result, Paul lost The Secret Storm, maintained his positions at Love of Life and As the World Turns, and assumed the keyboard duties at longtime favorite Guiding Light.

By the early 1970s, however, times were changing. Paul soon lost Love of Life but transitioned both As the World Turns and Guiding Light to orchestral arrangements. He would later do likewise for NBC's relatively short-lived Somerset, ABC's successful General Hospital, and the last year of CBS's Love of Life after ten years' absence from that series.

In 2009, Soapluvva established a YouTube tribute channel to both Charles Paul and Eddie Layton, who were colleagues of each other at the CBS Broadcast Center in Manhattan.
