= Charles H. Paul =

American judge

Charles H. Paul (1890–?) was a lawyer and judge who was heavily involved in Washington state Republican Party politics and served as the state manager for Robert A. Taft, "Mr. Republican," during the 1948 and 1952 presidential elections.

Charles H. Paul attended Yale University and the Harvard Law School. He began practicing law in Washington state with the firm of Hughes, McMicken, Dovell, and Ramsey; then practiced with the firm of Bogle, Graves, Merritt, and Bogle; and in 1916 formed the partnership of Flick and Paul. In 1917 he served as First Lieutenant, 364th Infantry, 91st Division during World War I and in 1922 resumed his work with Flick and Paul.

In 1924 he was elected to the Superior Court of the State of Washington for King County and served as the Chairman of the King County Republican Convention that same year. In 1932 he was elected president of the Washington State Bar Association. He headed the state pre-convention campaign in 1940 and then established the firm of Hulbert, Helsell and Paul in 1942. In 1948 and 1952 was the state manager for Robert A. Taft's campaigns.
