= John Cecil Holm =

American dramatist

- Born: 4 November 1904; Philadelphia, Pennsylvania
- Died: 24 October 1981 (aged 76); Westerly, Rhode Island
- Occupations: Playwright, theatre director, actor
- Spouse(s): Dolores L. Boland; Faith Brown

John Cecil Holm (November 4, 1904, in Philadelphia, Pennsylvania – October 24, 1981, in Westerly, Rhode Island) was an American dramatist, theatre director and actor. He is best known for his 1935 play Three Men on a Horse, co-written with George Abbott. He was often billed as Cecil Holm as an actor, reserving his full name for his writing credits.

== Education ==
Holm was educated at West Philadelphia High School and Perkiomen School and was a graduate of the University of Pennsylvania, where he acted in productions of the Mask and Wig organization. He worked in stock theater for three years before moving to New York and acting there.

== Death ==
On October 24, 1981, Holm died in Westerly, Rhode Island, at age 76.

== Broadway roles ==
- Bloodstream (1932) as James Knox
- Dangerous Corner (1932) as Gordon Whitehouse
- Mary of Scotland (1933) as Jamie a guard
- Mr. President (1962) as Chester Kincaid
- Forty Carats (1969) as Mr. Latham

== Film roles ==
Year	Title	Role	Notes
1959	It Happened to Jane	Aaron Caldwell	
1970	Cauliflower Cupids		
