= Lindsay and Crouse =

American screenwriter

Lindsay and Crouse was the writing team of Howard Lindsay and Russel Crouse, who collaborated famously on a succession of Broadway plays and musicals for 27 years during the mid 20th century. Their first collaboration was the rewriting of the book for the Cole Porter musical Anything Goes in 1935. They continued to co-pen books for Broadway musicals through 1962, including Rodgers and Hammerstein's The Sound of Music in 1959, for which they won the Tony Award for Best Musical. They also penned several successful comedies; notably winning the Pulitzer Prize for Drama in 1945 for their original play State of the Union. Several of their works were adapted into motion pictures. The team also co-produced the original production of Arsenic and Old Lace by playwright Joseph Kesselring.

At the 13th Tony Awards in 1959, Lindsay and Crouse received a Special Tony Award honoring "collaboration that lasted longer than Gilbert and Sullivan."

== Shared work ==
Howard Lindsay and Russel Crouse first collaborated on the rewriting of the book of Anything Goes (1934) which became a major hit and has been frequently revived. They co-authored the books for several musicals with prominent composers and lyricists, including the books for Cole Porter's Red, Hot and Blue (1936), Yip Harburg and Harold Arlen's Hooray for What! (1937), Irving Berlin's Call Me Madam (1950), Harold Karr's Happy Hunting (1956), and Rodgers and Hammerstein's The Sound of Music (1959). Their last collaboration was the 1962 Irving Berlin musical, Mr. President.

They wrote the play Life with Father, which opened in 1939 and starred Lindsay and his wife Dorothy Stickney. It ran for over seven years to become the longest-running non-musical play on Broadway. Other original Broadway plays they penned together included Strip for Action (1942), Life With Mother (1948), Remains to Be Seen (1951), The Prescott Proposals (1953), The Great Sebastians (1956), and Tall Story (1959). In 1946, they were awarded the Pulitzer Prize for Drama for their 1945 play, State of the Union.

In addition to writing the books for Broadway shows, they were also "show doctors" who were asked to come and improve Broadway shows in out-of-town tryouts, assisting the director and author of the show to improve the script. They also co-produced the original production of the play Arsenic and Old Lace which ran on Broadway from 1941 through 1944.

Many of Lindsay and Crouse's plays and librettos for musicals were adapted into films, usually by other Hollywood screenwriters. The duo did co-author the screenplay for the 1936 film version of Anything Goes, starring Bing Crosby. Other films adapted from their musical books include the 1953 film Call Me Madam, starring Ethel Merman, and the 1965 film The Sound of Music, starring Julie Andrews and Christopher Plummer. Film adaptations of their plays include Life with Father (1947, starring William Powell, Irene Dunne, and Elizabeth Taylor), State of the Union (1948, starring Katharine Hepburn, Spencer Tracy, and Angela Lansbury) Remains to Be Seen (1953, starring June Allyson and Van Johnson), and Tall Story (1960, starring Anthony Perkins and Jane Fonda).

Crouse named his daughter, the actress Lindsay Crouse, after his longstanding partner.
