= Arsenic and Old Lace (play) =

Play by Joseph Kesselring

- First edition, 1941.
- Original language: English
- Written by: Joseph Kesselring
- Characters: Mortimer Brewster; Martha Brewster; Abby Brewster; Teddy Brewster; Jonathan Brewster; The Rev. Dr. Harper; Elaine Harper; Dr. Einstein
- Genre: Dark comedy
- Setting: The living room of the Brewster home in Brooklyn. The Present.

Premiere
- Date: January 10, 1941
- Place: Fulton Theatre, Broadway

Arsenic and Old Lace is a play by American playwright Joseph Kesselring, written in 1939. It has become best known through the 1944 film adaptation starring Cary Grant and directed by Frank Capra.

The play was produced by Lindsay and Crouse and directed by Bretaigne Windust, and opened on Broadway at the Fulton Theatre on January 10, 1941. On September 25, 1943, the play moved to the Hudson Theatre, closing there on June 17, 1944, having played 1,444 performances. The West End production – directed by Marcel Varnel and produced at London's Strand Theatre – enjoyed a similarly long run. Opening on December 23, 1942, and closing on March 2, 1946, it totalled 1,337 performances.

Of the 12 plays written by Kesselring, Arsenic and Old Lace was by far the most successful. According to the opening night review in The New York Times, the play was "so funny that none of us will ever forget it."

== Synopsis ==
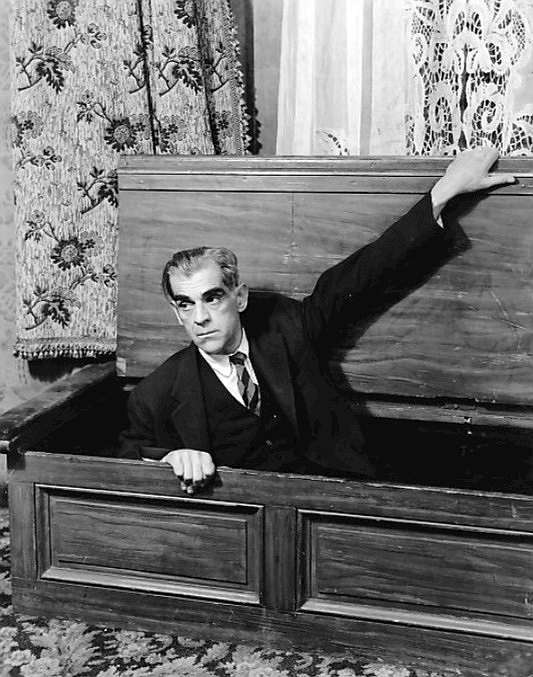
Boris Karloff as Jonathan Brewster

The play is a farcical black comedy revolving around the Brewster family, descended from Mayflower settlers but now composed of maniacs, many of them homicidal.

Act 1

Two elderly sisters, Abby and Martha Brewster, live in the old family home in Brooklyn. Their father was a doctor who made a fortune selling patent medicine, and their nephew Teddy, who lives with them, believes he is President Theodore Roosevelt, much to the consternation of the neighbours. Teddy's brother Mortimer, a theatre-hating drama critic, is seeing Elaine, daughter of the minister who lives next door. The other Brewster brother, Jonathan, left home years ago and has not been heard from since.

Mortimer proposes to Elaine, much to the delight of his aunts, but is worried he'll inherit the family madness. After Elaine leaves, Mortimer is shocked to discover a dead body hidden in the window seat. He's even more horrified when his aunts glibly confess to killing the man. They've taken to murdering lonely old men by poisoning them with a glass of home-made elderberry wine laced with arsenic, strychnine, and "just a pinch" of cyanide. They've killed a dozen men. Teddy digs graves for them in the cellar, convinced he's digging locks for the Panama Canal and that the dead men all died of yellow fever. Mortimer is horrified, especially when he narrowly prevents them from poisoning another man. He breaks off his engagement without explanation. Later, Jonathan returns to the home, having escaped from prison in Indiana. He's accompanied by an alcoholic accomplice, Dr. Herman Einstein (a character based on real-life gangland surgeon Joseph Moran), who has performed plastic surgery on him to conceal his identity, and now looks like horror-film actor Boris Karloff (a self-referential joke — the part was originally played on Broadway by Karloff). They're looking for a hideout and a place to dispose of their own murder victim.

Act 2

Mortimer and the aunts are not pleased to see Jonathan, but reluctantly agree to let him spend the night. Jonathan and Dr. Einstein plan to turn Grandfather Brewster's old lab into an illicit plastic surgery clinic for criminals who want to hide their identities. Mortimer and the aunts try to hide their body from the intruders, while Jonathan and Dr. Einstein try to bury their body in the cellar. They're interrupted by Elaine, who wants to know why Mortimer broke off the engagement, and local police officer O'Hara, who wants Mortimer to help him write a play. Mortimer threatens to tell O'Hara about Jonathan's murder victim, but Jonathan, who is alerted to the corpse in the cellar by Dr. Einstein, threatens Mortimer in kind. After getting rid of Elaine and O'Hara, the aunts tell Jonathan about their own murders. Jonathan is angry that the aunts have killed the same number of people as he has, and is determined to beat them.

Act 3

Jonathan plans to kill Mortimer and Teddy, though Dr. Einstein is reluctant. The criminals tie up Mortimer, but are interrupted by O'Hara, who returns to work on the play and is oblivious to Mortimer's predicament. Elaine returns and rescues Mortimer. The police, led by surly Lt. Rooney, raid the house and recognize Jonathan as a fugitive. Jonathan, Teddy, and the aunts insist that there are thirteen bodies in the cellar, but the police think they are all crazy. Lt. Rooney orders Teddy to be committed to a sanitarium. The aunts refuse to abandon Teddy and insist they be committed as well. They leave the house to Mortimer, but confess that he is actually the illegitimate son of their old cook, and therefore not a Brewster by blood. This delights Mortimer, who feels he can now marry Elaine. Dr. Einstein glibly walks out the front door, unnoticed by the police. Jonathan is arrested and taken away, but taunts the aunts that he's still killed as many people as they have. The play ends with the aunts offering the superintendent of the sanitarium a nice glass of elderberry wine.

== Cast ==
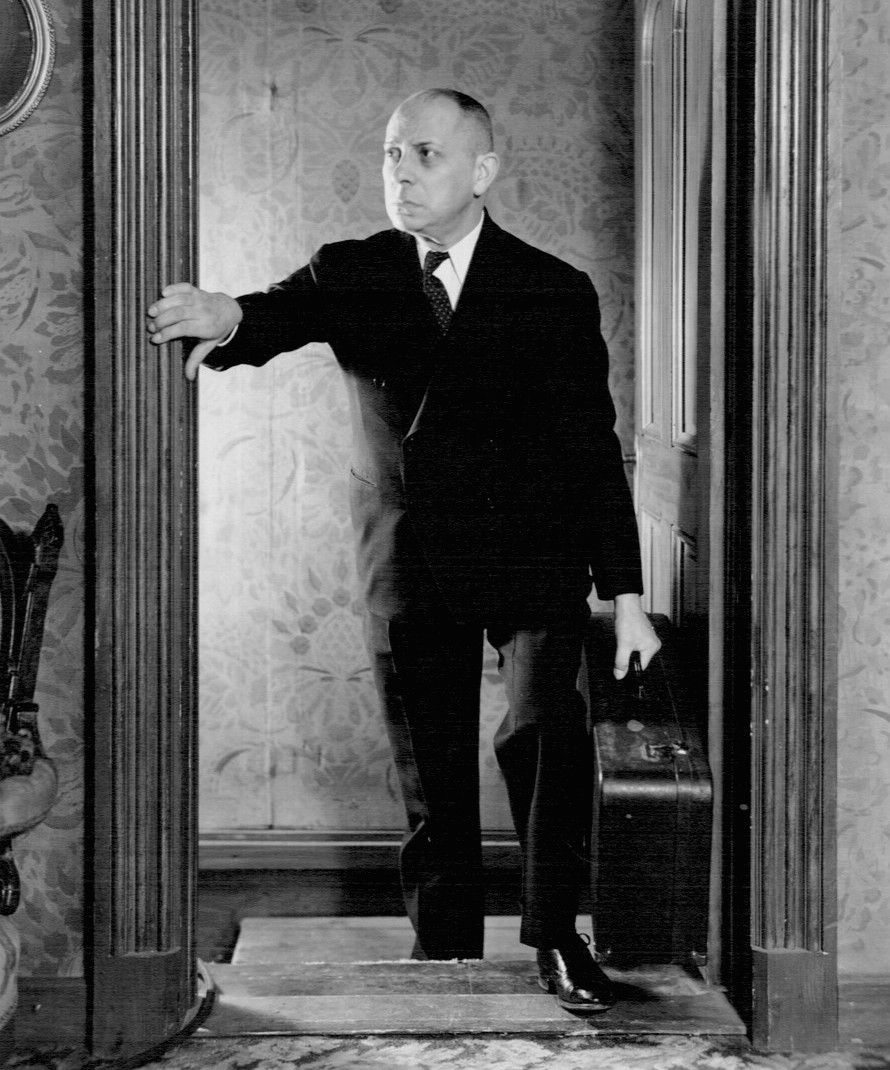
Erich von Stroheim replaced Boris Karloff as Jonathan Brewster in the original Broadway production.

The opening night cast consisted of:

- Jean Adair as Martha Brewster
- John Alexander as Teddy Brewster
- Wyrley Birch as The Rev. Dr. Harper
- Helen Brooks as Elaine Harper
- Bruce Gordon as Officer Klein
- Henry Herbert as Mr. Gibbs
- Josephine Hull as Abby Brewster
- Allyn Joslyn as Mortimer Brewster
- Boris Karloff as Jonathan Brewster
- William Parke as Mr. Witherspoon
- John Quigg as Officer Brophy
- Anthony Ross as Officer O'Hara
- Edgar Stehli as Dr. Einstein
- Victor Sutherland as Lieutenant Rooney

== Inspiration ==
When Kesselring taught at Bethel College in North Newton, Kansas, he lived in a boarding house called the Goerz House, and many of the features of its living room are reflected in the Brewster sisters' living room, where the action of the play is set. The Goerz House is now the home of the college president.

The "murderous old lady" plot line may also have been inspired by actual events that occurred in a house on Prospect St in Windsor, Connecticut, where a woman, Amy Archer-Gilligan, took in boarders, promising "lifetime care," and poisoned them for their pensions. M. William Phelps’s book The Devil's Rooming House (2010) tells the story of the police officers and reporters from the Hartford Courant who solved the case. Kesselring originally conceived the play as a heavy drama, but it is widely believed that producers Howard Lindsay and Russel Crouse (who were also well known as play doctors) convinced Kesselring that it would be much more effective as a comedy. According to The Encyclopedia of American Humorists, Lindsay and Crouse gave the play its title by adapting the title of a Frank Sullivan humor collection called Broccoli and Old Lace.

== National tours ==
In parallel with the main Broadway run (January 10, 1941 – June 17, 1944), a series of national roadshows took place, the first one in 1941–1942 which travelled to 57 cities in about 18 months, opening in Chicago on April 1, 1941. The cast comprised Laura Hope Crews as Abby Brewster, Effie Shannon as Martha Brewster, Angie Adams as Elaine Harper, Erich von Stroheim as Jonathan Brewster, Jack Whiting as Mortimer Brewster, and Forrest Orr as Teddy Brewster. In December 1941, von Stroheim returned to New York to take over the role of Jonathan Brewster from Karloff on Broadway.

A second national tour started on August 5–18, 1943 in San Francisco, then continued in Los Angeles from August 20 until October 24. The cast included Minna Phillips as Abby Brewster, Ida Moore as Martha Brewster, Louise Arthur as Elaine Harper, Bela Lugosi as Jonathan Brewster, Michael Whalen as Mortimer Brewster, and Herbert Corthell as Teddy Brewster.

A third national tour took place on January 29, 1944 for a run of 80 performances throughout the Midwest and East Coast that lasted until June 3, 1944. The cast included Jean Adair as Abby Brewster, Ruth McDevitt as Martha Brewster, Ann Lincoln as Elaine Harper, Bela Lugosi as Jonathan Brewster, Jack Whiting as Mortimer Brewster, and Malcolm Beggs as Teddy Brewster.

Lugosi carried on playing the role of Jonathan Brewster, in New Hope, PA (June 30–July 5, 1947); in Saratoga Springs, New York (August 5, 1947); in Sea Cliff, New York (August 9–14, 1948); in Fayetteville, New York (July 11–16, 1949); and in St. Louis, Missouri (January 19–25, 1954). His box office returns reflected better sales than when Boris Karloff travelled through the same cities.

== TV adaptations ==
On January 5, 1955, a 60-minute version of the play aired on the CBS Television series The Best of Broadway. It starred Boris Karloff, recreating his stage role as homicidal maniac Jonathan Brewster. Helen Hayes and Billie Burke played his not-so-innocent aunts, Abby and Martha. Peter Lorre and Edward Everett Horton repeated their roles as Dr. Einstein and Mr. Witherspoon, which they had played in Frank Capra's film version. John Alexander, who created the role of Teddy Brewster on Broadway and reprised it in the film version, returned once more to play the role in the broadcast. Orson Bean played the role of Mortimer Brewster.

Karloff played Jonathan once more (and for the last time) on the February 5, 1962 broadcast of NBC's Hallmark Hall of Fame. Dorothy Stickney and Mildred Natwick played Abby and Martha. Joseph Kesselring had sent his original play, then titled Bodies in Our Cellar, to Stickney when she was starring opposite her husband Howard Lindsay on Broadway in Life with Father (opened in 1939), with a view to her playing Abby Brewster. It would be 23 years before she would finally play the part. Tony Randall played Mortimer in the Hallmark production and Tom Bosley played Teddy.

In 1969, Robert Scheerer directed a TV version with Helen Hayes and Lillian Gish as the elderly aunts, Bob Crane as Mortimer, Fred Gwynne as Jonathan, Sue Lyon as Elaine Harper and David Wayne as Teddy.

== Revivals ==
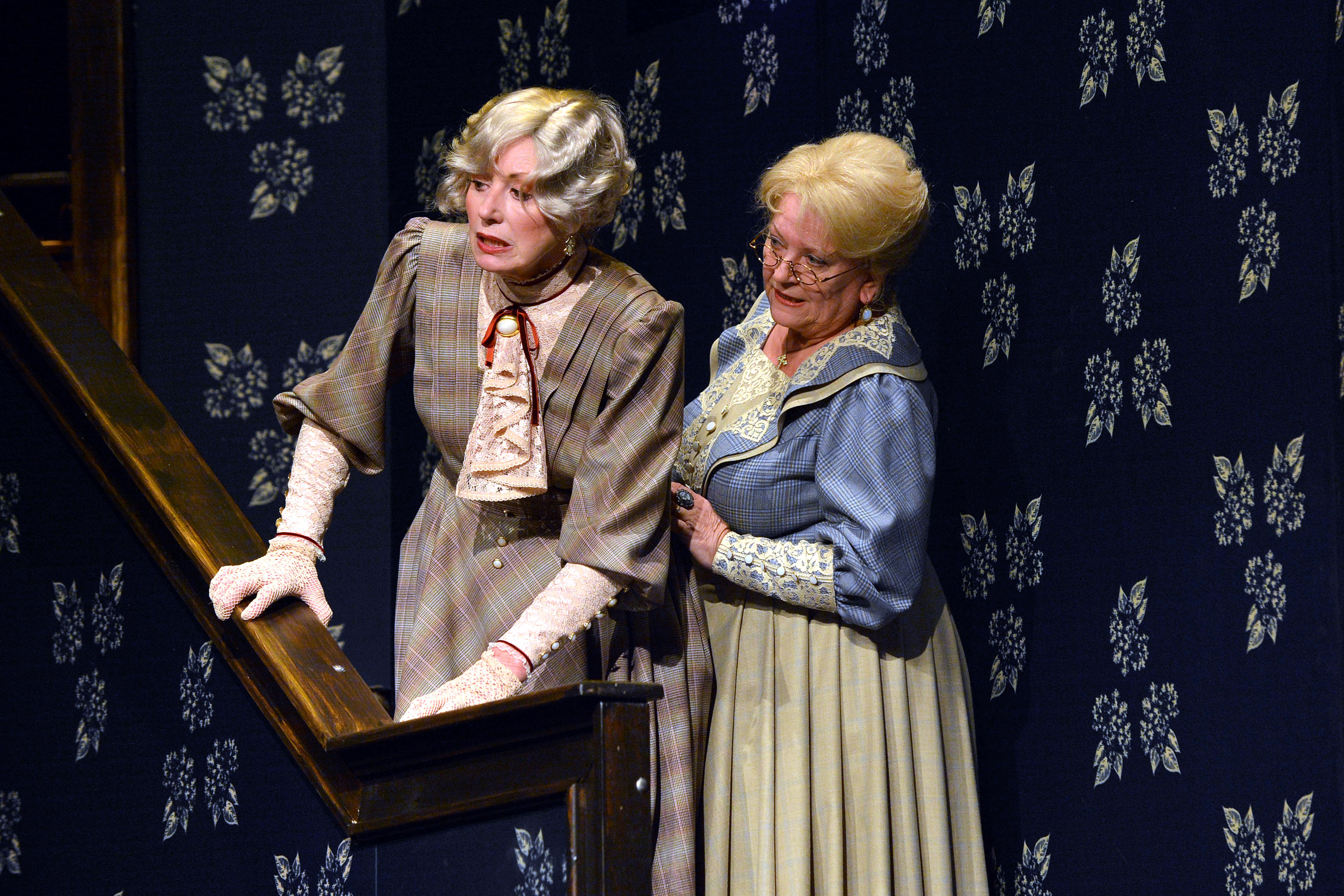
Jezinky a bezinky, a Czech translation of the play in performance by the Brno City Theatre in 2012

The play was produced by the Edinburgh Gateway Company in 1959. In 1966, Sybil Thorndike, Athene Seyler, Julia Lockwood and Richard Briers appeared in the play in London. The play is still widely performed and has been translated into many languages.

A Broadway revival of the play ran from June 26, 1986, to January 3, 1987, at the 46th Street Theatre in New York, starring Polly Holliday, Jean Stapleton, Tony Roberts and Abe Vigoda. This was followed by a ten-month tour of the play across the United States. Jean Stapleton was the only one of the original five leading players to go on the tour. The replacement cast consisted of Marion Ross, Gary Sandy, Larry Storch and Jonathan Frid.

A London revival of the play ran at the Strand Theatre (now the Novello Theatre) from February to June 2003, starring Thelma Barlow, Marcia Warren, Michael Richards and Stephen Tompkinson.
