= James MacArthur =

American actor and recording artist (1937–2010)

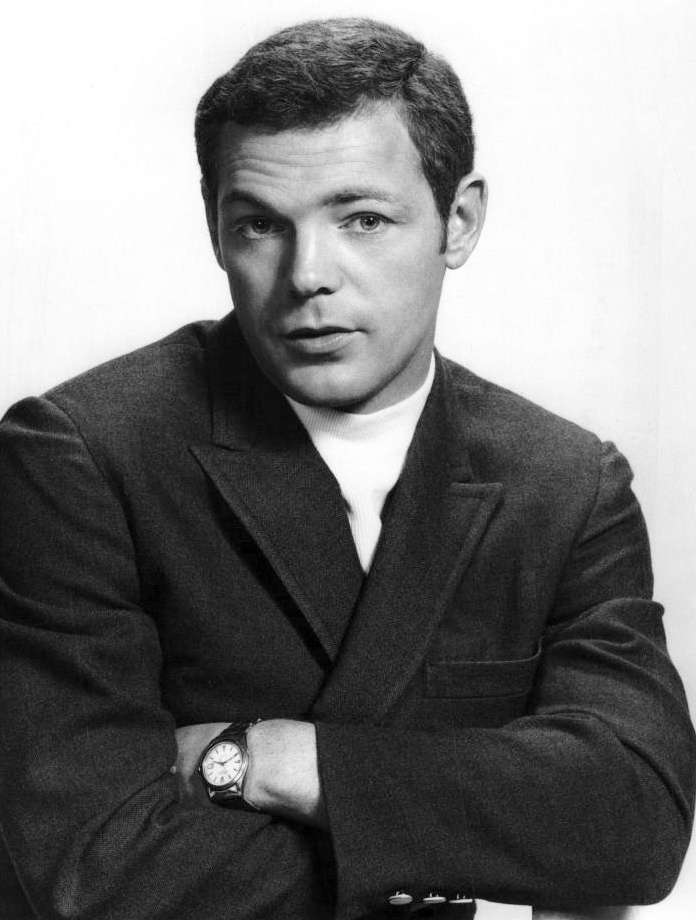
- MacArthur in 1968
- Born: James Gordon MacArthur; December 8, 1937; Los Angeles, California, U.S.
- Died: October 28, 2010 (aged 72); Jacksonville, Florida, U.S.
- Occupation: Actor
- Years active: 1955–2008
- Known for: Hawaii Five-O; Swiss Family Robinson
- Spouse(s): Joyce Bulifant (m. 1958; div. 1968) Melody Patterson (m. 1970; div. 1975) Helen Beth Duntz (m. 1984–2010)
- Children: 4
- Parent(s): Charles MacArthur; Helen Hayes
- Relatives: Mary MacArthur (sister); John D. MacArthur (uncle); J. Roderick MacArthur (cousin); John R. MacArthur (paternal first cousin once removed)

James Gordon MacArthur (December 8, 1937 – October 28, 2010) was an American actor and recording artist.

He had a long career in both movies and television, and his early work was predominantly in supporting roles in films. Later he had a starring role as Danny "Danno" Williams in the long-running television series Hawaii Five-O.

In 1963 his spoken-word recording "The Ten Commandments of Love" charted on the Billboard Hot 100, peaking at number 94.

== Early life ==
MacArthur was born in Los Angeles and was adopted by playwright Charles MacArthur and his wife, actress Helen Hayes. He was raised in Nyack, New York, along with his elder sister, the MacArthurs' biological daughter Mary, who died of polio in 1949 at the age of 19. He was educated at Allen-Stevenson School in New York and later at the Solebury School in New Hope, Pennsylvania, where he excelled in basketball, football, and baseball.

In his final year at Solebury, MacArthur played guard on the football team; captained the basketball team; rewrote the school's constitution; edited the school paper; played Scrooge in a local presentation of A Christmas Carol; and was president of his class, the student government, and the drama club. He also dated fellow student and future actress Joyce Bulifant, whom he married in November 1958 and divorced nine years later.

MacArthur was raised among people of literary and theatrical talent. Lillian Gish was his godmother, and his family's guests included John Steinbeck, John Barrymore, Harpo Marx, Ben Hecht, Beatrice Lillie, and the humorist Robert Benchley.

== Acting career ==
=== Early career ===
MacArthur's first radio role was on the Theatre Guild on the Air in 1948, accompanying his mother Helen Hayes.

MacArthur made his stage debut in Olney, Maryland, in 1949 with a two-week stint in The Corn Is Green. His sister Mary, who was also in the play, had requested that he join the company. The following summer he repeated the role in Dennis, Massachusetts, and his theatrical career was under way.

In 1954 he played John Day in Life with Father with Howard Lindsay and Dorothy Stickney. He became involved in important Broadway productions only after receiving his training in summer-stock theater. He worked as a set painter, lighting director, and chief of the parking lot. During a Helen Hayes festival at the Falmouth Playhouse on Cape Cod, he had a few walk-on parts. He also helped the theater's electrician and became so interested that he was allowed to remain after his mother's plays had ended. As a result he lit the show for Barbara Bel Geddes in The Little Hut and for Gloria Vanderbilt in The Swan.

=== Television ===
In 1955, at the age of 18, MacArthur played Hal Ditmar in the television play '"Deal a Blow", an episode of the series Climax! directed by John Frankenheimer and starring Macdonald Carey, Phyllis Thaxter and Edward Arnold. The critical response was excellent, with The New York Times saying that he "performed splendidly."

The following year, Frankenheimer directed the film version of the play, which was renamed The Young Stranger (1957), with MacArthur again in the starring role. His performance was again critically acclaimed, earning him a nomination for Most Promising Newcomer at the 1958 BAFTA awards.

In late 1956, it was announced that MacArthur would make Underdog, based on a novel by W. R. Burnett, along with his mother and Susan Strasberg, but the project never materialized.

MacArthur returned to television to appear in World in White (1957) and episodes of General Electric Theater, Studio One in Hollywood and Westinghouse Desilu Playhouse.

=== Disney ===
MacArthur was selected by Walt Disney to star in The Light in the Forest (1958), playing a white man raised by Indians. In April 1957, he signed a three-picture deal with Disney. For Light in the Forest he was paid $2,500 per week, which increased to $3,000 per week for the second film and $3,500 for the third. However, MacArthur was only available to work during his summer vacation from Harvard, where he was studying history.

Disney executives liked his performance and cast him in Third Man on the Mountain (1959), playing a young man who climbs the Matterhorn. His mother had a cameo role.

Deciding to make acting his full-time career, he left Harvard in his second year to appear in two more Disney movies, Kidnapped (1960) and Swiss Family Robinson (1960). He was named a possibility for Bon Voyage (1962) but did not appear in the film.

MacArthur made his Broadway debut in 1960 playing opposite Jane Fonda in Invitation to a March, for which he received a Theatre World Award. Although he never returned to Broadway, he remained active in theater throughout his career, appearing in such productions as Under the Yum Yum Tree, The Moon Is Blue, John Loves Mary (with his wife Joyce Bulifant), Barefoot in the Park and Murder at the Howard Johnson's.

He also released several records in the early 1960s, scoring two minor hits with "(The Story of) The In-Between Years" and "The Ten Commandments of Love", which peaked at number 94 on the Billboard Hot 100 in 1963.

MacArthur delivered a chilling performance as baby-faced opium dealer Johnny Lubin in The Untouchables episode "Death For Sale". He also appeared in episodes of the television shows Bus Stop and Wagon Train. He returned to feature films as one of several young actors in The Interns (1962), Columbia's popular medical drama.

He appeared in episodes of The Dick Powell Theatre, Sam Benedict and Arrest and Trial, then made Spencer's Mountain (1963) at Warner Bros. with Henry Fonda and Cry of Battle (1963) in the Philippines.

In 1963, MacArthur was nominated for the Top New Male Personality category of the Golden Laurel Awards. That year, he starred in and produced a pilot for a television series about a writer, Postmark: Jim Fletcher, but it was not sold.

He guest-starred on the television shows Burke's Law, The Eleventh Hour, The Great Adventure, and The Alfred Hitchcock Hour before appearing in the feature films The Truth About Spring and The Bedford Incident, both in 1965.

In Battle of the Bulge (1965), MacArthur again played the role of a young and inexperienced officer. He appeared in Ride Beyond Vengeance (1966) and guest-starred on Branded, Combat!, Gunsmoke, Hondo, Insight, Death Valley Days, Bonanza, The Virginian, Twelve O'Clock High and Tarzan.

MacArthur returned to Disney to appear in Willie and the Yank (1967) for television, released theatrically as Mosby's Marauders. He also had a role in The Love-Ins (1967) for Sam Katzman and a brief but memorable appearance in the Clint Eastwood film Hang 'Em High (1968) as a preacher.

=== Hawaii Five-O ===
Hang 'Em High was written by Leonard Freeman, who was producing a new police procedural, Hawaii Five-O. Tim O'Kelly was originally cast as Jack Lord's assistant, but test audiences felt that he was too young, so MacArthur was offered the role. MacArthur said that Lord "said 'book him' to others in the cast, but I guess he said it to me the most. It wasn't anything we really thought about at first. But the phrase just took off and caught the public's imagination."

Appearing in the show made MacArthur wealthy, and he invested much of his earnings in Hawaiian real estate.

MacArthur left the show in 1979, feeling that it had become bland and predictable. It was canceled one year later. He later reflected: "It was just time. I called the producer from South America and told him I was heading down the Amazon River."

William Smith, who replaced him on the show, claimed that MacArthur quit "because Jack Lord wouldn't let him have a dressing room. He had to change in the prop truck for eleven years."

=== After Hawaii Five-O ===
After leaving Hawaii Five-O, McArthur guest-starred on television shows such as Time Express, Murder, She Wrote, The Love Boat, Fantasy Island, Walking Tall, The Littlest Hobo,Vega$ and Superboy. He also appeared in the miniseries Alcatraz: The Whole Shocking Story (1980) and The Night the Bridge Fell Down (1983). He returned to the stage, appearing in A Bedfull of Foreigners in Chicago in 1984 and in Michigan in 1985. He followed this with The Hasty Heart before taking a year out of show business.

In 1987, he again took to the stage in The Foreigner, and then played Mortimer in the national tour of Arsenic and Old Lace. In 1989, he followed another stint in The Foreigner with Love Letters and in 1990–1991, A Bedfull of Foreigners in Las Vegas.

=== Semi-retirement ===
From 1959 to 1960, MacArthur partnered with actors James Franciscus and Alan Ladd, Jr. in the ownership of a Beverly Hills telephone-answering service. In June 1972, he directed the Honolulu Community Theatre in a production of his father's play The Front Page.

He appeared at conventions, collectors' shows and celebrity sporting events. A keen golfer, he won the 2002 Frank Sinatra Celebrity Invitational Golf Tournament.

MacArthur also appeared in television and radio specials and on interview programs such as Entertainment Tonight, Christopher's Closeup and the BBC Radio 5 Live obituary program Brief Lives, in which he paid tribute to his Hawaii Five-O castmate Kam Fong. In 1997, MacArthur returned without Jack Lord (who was in declining health) to reprise his character, who had become Hawaii's governor, in the 1997 unaired reboot pilot of Hawaii Five-O.

In April 2003, he traveled to Honolulu's historic Hawaii Theatre for a cameo role in Joe Moore's play Dirty Laundry. Negotiations were under way in summer 2010 for MacArthur to make a cameo appearance in the new CBS primetime remake of Hawaii Five-0 at the time of his death, a role that eventually was offered to Al Harrington. Before the start of the November 1, 2010, episode, MacArthur's death was mentioned in a short tribute.

In 2001, a Golden Palm Star on the Palm Springs Walk of Stars was dedicated to MacArthur.

== Personal life and death ==
From 1958 to 1968, he was married to actress Joyce Bulifant. From 1970 to 1975, he was married to actress Melody Patterson. At the time of his death, MacArthur was married to former LPGA golfer Helen Beth Duntz. MacArthur had two daughters and two sons.

MacArthur died on October 28, 2010, at the age of 72 of unspecified causes in Jacksonville, Florida.

== Filmography ==
Year	Title	Role	Notes
1953	Take the High Ground!		
1955	Climax!	Hal Ditmar	Deal a Blow
1957	The Arthur Murray Party	Self	April 30, 1957
1957	The Young Stranger	Harold James "Hal" Ditmar	
1958	General Electric Theater	Johnny Dundeen	The Young and the Scared
1958	Studio One	Jim Gibson	Ticket to Tahiti
1958	Studio One	Ben Adams	Tongues of Angels
1958	The Light in the Forest	Johnny Butler / True Son	
1959	Westinghouse Desilu Playhouse	Jamsie Corcoran	The Innocent Assassin
1959	Third Man on the Mountain	Rudi Matt	
1959	Wagon Train	Waiter	The Jenny Tannen Story, Uncredited
1960	Kidnapped	David Balfour	
1960	Night of the Auk	Lt. Mac Hartman	
1960	Swiss Family Robinson	Fritz Robinson	
1960	The Play of the Week	Lieutenant Max	Night of the Auk
1963	Spencer's Mountain	Clayboy Spencer	
1961	Walt Disney's Wonderful World of Color	Johnny Butler / True Son	Archive footage Light in the Forest: True Son's Revenge
1961	The Play of the Week	Lt. Max Hartman	Night of the Auk
1961	The Untouchables	Johnny Lubin	Death for Sale
1961	Bus Stop	Thomas Quincy Hagan	And the Pursuit of Evil
1962	Insight	Jim Brown	The Sophomore
1962	Wagon Train	Dick Pederson	The Dick Pederson Story
1962	The Interns	Dr. Lew Worship	
1962	The Dick Powell Show	Jack Doffer	The Court Martial of Captain Wycliff
1963	Walt Disney's Wonderful World of Color	Rudi Matt	Archive footage Banner in the Sky: To Conquer the Mountain
1963	Walt Disney's Wonderful World of Color	Rudi Matt	Archive footage Banner in the Sky: The Killer Mountain
1963	Walt Disney's Wonderful World of Color	David Balfour	Archive footage Kidnapped: Part 1
1963	Walt Disney's Wonderful World of Color	David Balfour	Archive footage Kidnapped: Part 2
1963	Sam Benedict	Bert Stover	Some Fires Die Slowly
1963	Spencer's Mountain	Clayboy Spencer	
1963	Arrest and Trial	Deke Palmer	A Shield is for Hiding Behind
1963	Cry of Battle	David McVey	
1963	Burke's Law (1963 TV series)	Larry Forsythe	Who Killed the Kind Doctor?
1963	The Eleventh Hour	Mason Walker	La Belle Indifference
1963	The Great Adventure	Lieutenant Alexander	The Hunley
1964	The Great Adventure	Rodger Young	Rodger Young
1964	The Alfred Hitchcock Hour	Dave Snowden	Behind the Locked Door
1965	The Truth About Spring	William Ashton	
1965	The Bedford Incident	Ensign Ralston	
1965	The Virginian	Johnny Bradford	Jennifer
1965	Battle of the Bulge	Lieutenant Weaver	
1966	Ride Beyond Vengeance	The Census Taker	
1966	Branded	Lt. Laurence	A Destiny Which Made Us Brothers
1966	12 O'Clock High	Lt. Wilson	The Outsider
1966	Gunsmoke	David McGovern	Harvest
1967	Dateline: Hollywood	Self	June 19, 1967
1967	Walt Disney's Wonderful World of Color	Cpl. Henry Jenkins	Willie and the Yank: The Deserter; Willie and the Yank: The Mosby Raiders
1967	Combat!	Jack Cole	Encounter
1967	The Love-Ins	Larry Osborne	
1967	Mosby's Marauders	Cpl. Henry Jenkins	
1967	Insight	Billy Thorp	Some Talk About Pool Rooms and Gin Mills
1967	Hondo	Judd Barton	Hondo and the Mad Dog
1967	Tarzan	Dr. Richard Wilson	The Pride of the Lioness
1967	Bonanza	Jason 'Jase' Fredericks	Check Rein
1967	Death Valley Days	Kit Carson	Spring Rendezvous
1968	Death Valley Days	Kit Carson	The Indian Girl
1968	Hang 'Em High	The Preacher	
1968	The Angry Breed	Deek Stacey	
1968	Premiere	Russ Faine	Lassiter
1968– 1979	Hawaii Five-O	Det. Danny Williams	259 episodes
1971	The Movie Game	Self	June 28, 1971; July 4, 1971
1971	Hollywood Squares	Self	April 12, 1971
1972	Hollywood Squares	Self	March 6, 1972
1973	Hollywood Squares	Self	January 1, 1973
1977	Battle of the Network Stars III	Self	
1978	Battle of the Network Stars IV	Self	
1978	Fantasy Island	Fantasy Island	The Funny Girl/Butch and Sundance
1979	Time Express	Dr. Mark Toland	Garbage Man/Doctor's Wife
1979	The Love Boat	Chet Hanson	The Spider Serenade/The Wife Next Door/The Harder They Fall
1980	34th Annual Tony Awards	Self	
1980	Alcatraz: The Whole Shocking Story	Walt Stomer	
1980	The Love Boat	Scott Burgess	The Caller/The Marriage of Convenience/No Girls for Doc/Witness for the Prosecution
1981	Fantasy Island	Bob Graham	The Heroine/The Warrior
1981	Vega$	Jerry Lang	Heist
1981	Walking Tall	Father Adair	The Fire Within
1981	The Littlest Hobo	Jim Haley	Trail of No Return
1983	The Scheme of Things	Self	
1983	The Night the Bridge Fell Down	Cal Miller	
1983	The Love Boat	Paul Krakauer	I Don't Play Anymore/Gopher's Roommate/Crazy for You
1984	Murder, She Wrote	Alan Gephardt	Hooray for Homicide
1985	The Love Boat	Marc Silver	Vicki's Gentleman Caller/Partners to the End/The Perfect Arrangement
1989	The Adventures of Superboy	Hogan	Birdwoman of the Swamps
1991	JFK	uncredited David McVey	Archive footage Cry of Battle
1991	American Masters	Self	Helen Hayes: First Lady of the American Theatre
1994	The Wonderful World of Disney: 40 Years of Television Magic	Self	
1997	Hawaii Five-O (1997 TV pilot)	Governor Danny Williams	Unsold pilot episode
1997	Light Lunch	Self	70 Super Cops
1998	Storm Chasers: Revenge of the Twister	Frank Del Rio	(final film role)
2002	Swiss Family Robinson: Adventure in the Making	Narrator	Special thanks
2002	Inside TVLand: 40 Greatest Theme Songs	Self	
2002	Inside TVLand: Cops on Camera	Self	
2005	The 100 Greatest Family Films	Self	
2006	The 100 TV Quotes and Greatest Catch Phases	Self	
2007	Entertainment and TVLand Present: The 50 Greatest TV Icons	Self	
2008	The Age of Believing: The Disney Live Action Classics	Self	Grateful thanks
