= Remains to Be Seen =

Remains to Be Seen may refer to:

- Remains to Be Seen (film), a 1953 crime musical comedy film, based on the play
- Remains to Be Seen (play), a 1951 play by Howard Lindsay and Russel Crouse
- "Remains to Be Seen" (Dexter), an episode of the American television series Dexter
- "Remains to Be Seen" (Happy Tree Friends), an episode of Happy Tree Friends

== See also ==
- It Remains to Be Seen, a single-movement composition for orchestra by Nico Muhly
