= Arsenic & Old Lace =

- Newspaper ad showing the title Arsenic and Old Lace, whereas the title card of the film itself reads Arsenic & Old Lace
- Genre: Black comedy
- Based on: Arsenic and Old Lace; 1941 play by Joseph Kesselring
- Screenplay by: Robert Hartung
- Directed by: George Schaefer
- Starring: Tony Randall; Boris Karloff; Dorothy Stickney; Mildred Natwick; Tom Bosley
- Country of origin: United States
- Original language: English

Production
- Producers: George Schaefer; Robert Hartung
- Running time: 90 minutes

Original release
- Network: NBC
- Release: February 5, 1962

Arsenic & Old Lace is a 1962 television film directed by George Schaefer and starring Tony Randall, Dorothy Stickney, and Mildred Natwick. It first aired as the 3rd episode of season 11 of the NBC anthology series Hallmark Hall of Fame. It is an adaptation of Joseph Kesselring's 1939 play Arsenic and Old Lace.

== Plot ==
The story is a black comedy in which drama critic Mortimer Brewster (Randall) discovers that his elderly aunts Abby and Martha (Stickney and Natwick respectively) have been poisoning their lonely male guests.

== Cast ==
- Tony Randall as Mortimer Brewster
- Boris Karloff as Jonathan Brewster
- Dorothy Stickney as Abby Brewster
- Mildred Natwick as Martha Brewster
- Tom Bosley as Teddy Brewster
- George Voskovec as Dr. Herman Einstein
- Farrell Pelly as Reverend Dr. Harper
- Dort Clark as Officer Brophy
- Nathaniel Frey as Officer Klein
- Dody Heath as Elaine Harper
- Alan MacAteer as Mr. Gibbs
- Ralph Dunn as Lieutenant Rooney
- Edward F. Cullen as Mr. Witherspoon

== Production ==
Boris Karloff reprised his role as Jonathan Brewster (who is described by the other characters as resembling the Frankenstein star), which he had originated on Broadway. He had been unable to appear in Frank Capra's 1944 film because of a scheduling conflict, but had played Jonathan on television once before, in a 1955 adaptation for the CBS anthology series The Best of Broadway.

Karloff and director Schaefer had previously performed the play during World War II, touring Pacific islands such as Kwajalein to entertain troops for Special Services. Karloff reportedly tried to cajole Schaefer into playing the role of Teddy in the television adaptation as well, but he declined and the part went to Tom Bosley.

== Reception ==
Arsenic & Old Lace was well-received by critics, who called it "a fine, frolicsome TV adaptation" and "a well polished gem of a performance". Director Schaefer was praised for returning the focus of the story to the sisters Abby and Martha, as it had been in the play, rather than emphasizing Mortimer's romantic subplot, as had been the case in the 1944 film.
