= Life with Father (film) =

1947 film by Michael Curtiz

- Theatrical Film Poster
- Directed by: Michael Curtiz
- Screenplay by: Donald Ogden Stewart
- Based on: Life with Father 1935 autobiography by Clarence Day; Life with Father 1939 play by Howard Lindsay Russel Crouse
- Produced by: Robert Buckner
- Starring: William Powell; Irene Dunne; Elizabeth Taylor
- Cinematography: William V. Skall; J. Peverell Marley
- Edited by: George Amy
- Music by: Max Steiner
- Production company: Warner Bros. Pictures
- Distributed by: Warner Bros. Pictures
- Release date: September 13, 1947
- Running time: 118 minutes
- Country: United States
- Language: English
- Budget: $4,710,000
- Box office: $6,455,000

Life with Father

Life with Father is a 1947 American Technicolor comedy film adapted from the 1939 play of the same name, which was inspired by the autobiography of American writer and The New Yorker essayist Clarence Day.

It tells the true story of Day and his family in the 1880s. His father, Clarence Sr., wants to be master of his house, but finds his wife, Vinnie, and his children ignoring him until they start making demands for him to change his life. The story draws largely on Clarence Sr.'s stubborn, sometimes ill-tempered nature and Vinnie's insistence that he be baptized. It stars William Powell and Irene Dunne as Clarence Sr. and his wife, supported by Elizabeth Taylor, Edmund Gwenn, ZaSu Pitts, Jimmy Lydon, and Martin Milner.

== Plot summary ==
In New York, 1883, Clarence Day is a benevolent but curmudgeonly patriarch who strives to manage his household as efficiently as his Wall Street office to no success. He is married to Vinnie, who manages the household, and his four sons—Clarence Jr., John, Whitney, and Harlan—all have red hair, as do he and Vinnie. After breakfast, Clarence rants against the local political corruption in his home office. This frightens the new maid Annie who falls down the stairs, breaks a tray of coffee, and then quits. As Clarence leaves for work, Vinnie welcomes her cousin Cora Cartwright and Mary Skinner as they arrive to stay for the week, despite her husband's contempt for visitors.

Later that day, Rev. Dr. Lloyd arrives to discuss the building of the new church, though Clarence declines to donate large sums of money. Despite Clarence's objection, the family, along with Cora and Mary, eats at the Delmonico's restaurant for dinner. While dining, Mary states she is a Methodist, to which Clarence states he's an Episcopalian who has never been baptized. Startled by his confession, Vinnie pushes her husband to get baptized so he can go to heaven, but Clarence refuses as he is certain God will grant him entry.

Meanwhile, a romance blossoms between Clarence Jr. and Mary. After church, Clarence Jr. complains about wearing his father's suit and becomes irritated at Mary's flirtation, driving her to tears. Determined to earn enough money to purchase a new suit, Clarence Jr. confronts his father. Recognizing his son's maturity, Clarence instructs his son to act firm towards women. That same time, John earns a job selling patent medicines. When Vinnie falls ill, John and Clarence Jr. serve some of the medicine with her breakfast tea without her knowledge. The medicine worsens Vinnie's illness that Clarence promises that he will be baptized if she recovers.

As Vinnie recovers, she takes her sons shopping and meets Reverend Morley, who oversees a church in Audubon Park. She returns home, and tries to convince Clarence to be baptized there thus he will not be embarrassed in front of their congregation. However, Clarence reneges on his promise. He is then repulsed that Vinnie has purchased a ceramic pug dog, and pledges to be baptized if she returns the item. Clarence Jr. decides to exchange the ceramic pug dog for a new suit for the exact same price.

The next morning, on Sunday, Vinnie and Clarence learn that John's medicine has poisoned a neighbor's dog, and the neighbor demands money for a new dog. Clarence offers to repurchase every sold medicine bottle but is astounded at the high price. They also learn Vinnie consumed the same medicine when she was ill. As Cousin Cora and Mary return for another visit, Vinnie has arranged a cab drive to Audubon Park where Clarence is to be baptized. Despite his further protests, Clarence is persuaded by his wife to follow through on his promise, while Clarence Jr. and Mary reconcile.

== Cast ==
- William Powell as Clarence Day Sr.
- Irene Dunne as Vinnie Day
- Elizabeth Taylor as Mary Skinner
- Edmund Gwenn as Rev. Dr. Lloyd
- ZaSu Pitts as Cousin Cora Cartwright
- Jimmy Lydon as Clarence Day Jr.
- Emma Dunn as Margaret the Cook
- Moroni Olsen as Dr. Humphries
- Elisabeth Risdon as Mrs. Whitehead
- Martin Milner as John Day
- Johnny Calkins as Whitney Day
- Derek Scott as Harlan Day
- Heather Wilde as Annie, first maid
- Mary Field as Nora, third maid
- Monte Blue as The Policeman
- Queenie Leonard as Maggie, fourth maid
- Nancy Evans as Delia, second maid
- Clara Blandick as Miss Wiggins, the Maid Service Employment Agent
- Frank Elliott as Dr. Somers
- Douglas Kennedy as Reverend Morley (uncredited)

== Production ==
The movie was adapted by Donald Ogden Stewart from the 1939 play by Howard Lindsay and Russel Crouse, based on the 1935 autobiography by Clarence Day Jr. Day had worked as a stockbroker and was an author and cartoonist for The New Yorker. It was directed by Michael Curtiz.

Due to the Motion Picture Production Code standards of the day, the play's last line (in response to a policeman asking Mr. Day where he is going) "I'm going to be baptized, dammit!" had to be rewritten for the film, with the final word omitted. Mr. Day's frequent outbursts of "Oh, God!" were changed to "Oh, gad!" for the same reason.

== Reception ==
Leading film critics in 1947 gave Life with Father high marks, especially with regard to the quality of Warner Bros. Pictures' screen adaptation of the popular Broadway play and the quality of the cast's performances. The New York Times in its review directed special attention to William Powell's portrayal of Clarence Day:

A round-robin of praise is immediately in order for all those, and they were many indeed, who assisted in filming Life with Father. All that the fabulous play had to offer in the way of charm, comedy, humor and gentle pathos is beautifully realized in the handsomely Technicolored picture, which opened yesterday at the Warner (formerly the Hollywood) Theatre. William Powell is every inch Father, from his carrot patch dome to the tip of his button-up shoes. Even his voice, always so distinctive, has taken on a new quality, so completely has Mr. Powell managed to submerge his own personality. His Father is not merely a performance; it is character delineation of a high order and he so utterly dominates the picture that even when he is not on hand his presence is still felt.

Film Daily summarized Life with Father as "one of the finer examples of film making in Technicolor" that provides "a delightfully different insight into the human comedy of another day." In The Nation in 1947, critic James Agee wrote, "Rich, careful, rather heavily proficient. Fun, I suppose; but I can't really enjoy laughing at tyrants, least of all tyrants who are forgiven because of their innocence." Variety complimented Irene Dunne's restrained performance as Vinnie as well as the work of the film's supporting players and the production's cinematography and overall direction:

Miss Dunne and Powell have captured to a considerable extent the play's charm...Miss Dunne compares very favorably with the Dorothy Stickney original role, exacting the comedy from the part without overplaying it...

Elizabeth Taylor, as the vis-a-vis for Clarence Day, Jr., is sweetly feminine as the demure visitor to the Day household, while Jimmy Lydon, as young Clarence, is likewise effective as the potential Yale man. Edmund Gwenn, as the minister, and ZaSu Pitts, a constantly visiting relative, head the supporting players who contribute stellar performances.

It's a superlative production all the way, and no less important than any other feature of the pic is the photography. Michael Curtiz' direction is excellent, though unable to achieve, because of the very nature of the pic, anything more than a pedestrian pace.

=== Box office ===
According to Warner Bros., the film earned them $5,057,000 in the U.S. and $1,398,000 in other markets, for a total of $6,455,000 against a production budget of $4,710,000.

== Awards ==
Life with Father was nominated for Academy Awards for Best Actor in a Leading Role (William Powell), Best Art Direction-Set Decoration, Color (Robert M. Haas, George James Hopkins), Best Cinematography, Color and Best Music, Scoring of a Dramatic or Comedy Picture.

== Copyright status ==
Through a clerical error, Life with Father was not renewed for copyright and fell into the public domain in 1975.

Warner Bros. (or United Artists, the former owner of pre-1950 Warner Bros. films) still owns the theatrical distribution and music rights to the film, but other companies have been able to release non-theatrical, public-domain versions.

== See also ==
- Elizabeth Taylor filmography
