= Cry of Battle =

1963 film by Irving Lerner

- Original film poster
- Directed by: Irving Lerner
- Written by: Bernard Gordon
- Based on: Fortress in the Rice by Benjamin Appel
- Produced by: Joe Steinberg; Eddie Romero
- Starring: James MacArthur; Van Heflin; Rita Moreno; Leopoldo Salcedo
- Cinematography: Felipe Sacdalan
- Music by: Richard Markowitz
- Distributed by: Allied Artists
- Release date: October 1963
- Running time: 99 minutes
- Country: United States
- Language: English

Cry of Battle is a 1963 American coming-of-age action war film based on the 1951 novel Fortress in the Rice by Benjamin Appel, who was a journalist and special assistant to the U.S. commissioner for the Philippines from 1945–46. The film stars Van Heflin, James MacArthur, Rita Moreno and Leopoldo Salcedo. Set during the Japanese occupation of the Philippines, the working title was To Be a Man.

== Plot ==
The film begins on December 8, 1941, with the Japanese attacking the Philippines. Dave McVey Jr., the son of a rich American businessman with extensive holdings in the Philippines, is attacked by murderous bandits. He is rescued by Careo, a Filipino patriot who has put together a group of anti-Japanese Filipino guerrillas. Carero hides Dave with an elderly Filipino and his granddaughter, who teach Dave Tagalog.

Careo returns again to tell Dave that his father has left the Philippines, but Dave is joined by a fellow American, Joe Trent, a rough merchant sailor who was third mate on a cargo ship that was sunk by the Japanese. Joe's ship was part of a merchant line owned by Dave's father. Joe figures that Dave's father will reward him for keeping his son safe. Joe gets drunk and rapes the teenage granddaughter. When the girl starts screaming, Dave has no choice but to flee with Joe.

They meet a band of armed Filipinos led by Atong and the English-speaking woman Sisa. The quick-thinking Joe tells the band that if they bring them to Colonel Ryker, an American officer in charge of a guerrilla unit, Ryker will reward them. Ryker tells Dave that the Japanese would probably give him a comfortable existence and might repatriate him to the United States because of his father's extensive business dealings with Japan. Dave replies that his father's connections to Japan were from before the war and he would rather fight with the guerrillas. The group joins Ryker's unit in fighting the Japanese.

Joe is promoted to lieutenant and is ordered to accompany a Filipino captain Garcia on a raid against a Japanese-held sugar refinery and railway. Joe brings Dave, Atong, Sisa and a group of their original group along. Garcia and Dave sneak up on some Japanese who are bathing but Garcia is mortally wounded in the fight and begs Dave to go on as the mission is important. Joe spots an opportunity to back out of the mission but before they can return to Ryker, Garcia commits suicide forcing the group to proceed. Seeing Garcia dead, Atong kills one of his own men over Garcia's pistol. Joe makes Atong give the pistol to Dave.

Dave falls ill with Malaria, while Sisa tells Joe that Atong and his men won't proceed until they have food. Sisa and Atong guide the group into a village to ask the locals for food. As Dave is negotiating, Joe's group attack and massacres the villagers. Dave is shocked to see Sisa knew of the massacre in advance. Joe spots an opportunity and shoots Atong during the raid.

Sisa quickly switches her loyalties to Joe. When Dave complains, Joe knocks him to the ground. Dave does manage to get Joe to return on mission and they encounter another village. They sit down with the locals for music and dancing. The next morning Dave meets Careo now promoted to a Colonel.

Careo tells Dave he has evidence of Joe's guilt from the recent massacre and asks him to turn on Joe. He also tells them both that Colonel Ryker and his men were killed by the Japanese. Dave reads the statement against Joe and despite his better judgement tears up the statement deciding in the end not to turn Joe in. Careo returns and orders 4 of Atong and Joe's men to be executed.

Before Joe can be tried, the Japanese attack the village and wound Joe. Dave, Joe and Sisa manage to escape to the coast. While Joe recuperates Dave and Sisa explore. Dave hears an explosion and finds that the nearby railway line has been blown up by some local guerrillas. When Dave returns he is shocked to see that Joe has raped Sisa and the two men fight. Dave stops short of killing the older man.

Later Joe spots Colonel Careo and 2 men patrolling the beach. Dave implores him to ignore the Colonel but Joe loses his cool and ambushes the 3 men killing 1 of them but Careo escapes into the jungle. Dave intervenes despite Sisa begging him not to, fearing Joe will kill him. Realising Joe needs to be stopped he gains the upper hand on Joe who tries to bargain with him but this time Dave cannot forgive his friend and he shoots Joe, mortally wounding him. Colonel Carea returns and thanks Dave who agrees to fight on with Careo and the Filipinos.

== Cast ==
- Van Heflin as Joe Trent
- Rita Moreno as Sisa
- James MacArthur as David McVey
- Leopoldo Salcedo as Manuel Careo
- Sidney Clute as Col. Ryker
- Marilou Muñoz as Pinang
- Oscar Roncal as Atong
- Liza Moreno as Vera
- Michael Parsons as Capt. Davis
- Claude Wilson as Matchek
- Vic Silayan as Capt. Garcia

== Production ==
Producer Joe Steinberg had a wealthy brother named Harry Stonehill in the Philippines who assisted with the financing of the film. He hired his friends Irving Lerner to direct and Bernard Gordon to write the screenplay. Gordon saw the opportunity to use the screenplay as a comment on American attitudes toward Third World people and attitudes about masculinity, explaining the film's working title of To Be a Man. In the film, Dave asks Joe if raping his host's granddaughter made him feel like a man. Joe responds that fighting when necessary and having a woman when possible meant feeling like a man. Joe also initiates Dave into manhood by using his winnings in a poker game to give Dave a night with a prostitute. In Dave's first battle, he captures a panicked Japanese soldier, and Joe grabs Dave's hands and holds his rifle with bayonet, which he thrusts into the prisoner.

The film was shot in the Philippines. In early 1962, prior to filming, the visas were held up as the script was deemed offensive to Filipinos with Vice President Emmanuel Pelaez stating that the script "makes them the object of condescension and contempt" and was an "insult to the Filipino people".

Rita Moreno's scenes were shot around her travel to Hollywood to accept the Academy Award for Best Supporting Actress for West Side Story. A Filipino designed her dress for the awards ceremony, which Edith Head voted the most original of the night. The designer returned to the Philippines the next day.

Moreno's planned nude bathing scene in the film attracted a great deal of publicity. She eventually filmed the scene wearing a dress.

== Legacy ==
Cry of Battle is today remembered not for its own merits, but for the happenstance that it played at the Texas Theatre in Dallas in the afternoon of November 22, 1963, as the second part of a double feature with War Is Hell. Lee Harvey Oswald hid in the theater after assassinating President John F. Kennedy and shooting police officer J. D. Tippit and was arrested while War Is Hell was still playing.
