= State of the Union (film) =

1948 film by Frank Capra

- Theatrical release poster
- Directed by: Frank Capra
- Written by: Myles Connolly; Anthony Veiller (screenplay)
- Based on: State of the Union; 1945 play by Russel Crouse; Howard Lindsay
- Produced by: Frank Capra; Anthony Veiller
- Starring: Spencer Tracy; Katharine Hepburn; Van Johnson; Angela Lansbury; Adolphe Menjou; Lewis Stone
- Cinematography: George J. Folsey
- Edited by: William W. Hornbeck
- Music by: Victor Young
- Production company: Liberty Films
- Distributed by: Metro-Goldwyn-Mayer
- Release date: April 7, 1948
- Running time: 124 minutes
- Country: United States
- Language: English
- Budget: $2,439,000
- Box office: $3.5 million (U.S. rentals)

State of the Union is a 1948 American drama film directed by Frank Capra about a man's desire to run for the nomination as the Republican candidate for President, and the machinations of those around him. The New York Times described it as "a slick piece of screen satire...sharper in its knife-edged slicing at the hides of pachyderm schemers and connivers than was the original." The film was written by Myles Connolly and Anthony Veiller and was based on the 1945 Russel Crouse, Howard Lindsay Pulitzer Prize-winning play of the same name.

Capra and his screenwriters remained extremely faithful to the play, and, as the authors of the play had done during its two-year run, updated the script during filming to keep it timely. Spencer Tracy was the first choice of both Capra and the authors of the play to play the lead. Katharine Hepburn costars, and Adolphe Menjou, Van Johnson and Angela Lansbury play key roles. The film was Capra's only project for Metro-Goldwyn-Mayer. It was also the second and final film to be made by Liberty Films before it dissolved in 1951.

== Plot ==
After inheriting a newspaper empire from her father Sam Thorndyke (modeled on Hearst and Gannett) Republican newspaper magnate, Kay Thorndyke, intends to make her lover, aircraft tycoon Grant Matthews, U.S. president, with her as the power behind the throne. Thorndyke plans to use her newspaper chain's influence to deadlock the 1948 Republican National Convention, so it will choose Matthews as a compromise dark horse candidate, instead of Thomas E. Dewey, Robert A. Taft, Harold Stassen, Arthur Vandenberg, Douglas MacArthur, and Dwight Eisenhower.

Matthews is skeptical of the idea of running for president, but Thorndyke, Republican strategist Jim Conover, and campaign manager Spike McManus persuade him to test the waters by going on a speaking tour. Thorndyke believes that ambition and success will soon convince him. Matthews reunites with his estranged wife, Mary, for the campaign. Despite knowing about Thorndyke and her husband's affair, Mary agrees to support him in public because of his idealism and honesty, and because she is unaware of the extent of Thorndyke's role in the campaign. Thorndyke tells Matthews that scandal will ruin his chances, so they must no longer meet as lovers.

Wherever Matthews speaks, he appeals to the regular people; floods of telegrams from "ordinary" citizens pour in, thanking him for his message. But the powers and would-be influencers behind the political scenes are very unhappy. Matthews makes a controversial speech in Wichita, calling big labor to account. Before he makes another speech in Detroit giving big business the same treatment, Thorndyke comes to the hotel secretly and persuades him to use a prepared speech to help his chances for the nomination. Again, there are floods of telegrams, this time from people who can deliver votes in the primaries. Matthews becomes obsessed with becoming president and surrenders completely to anything Conover wants him to do. Thorndyke remains in the background, because knowledge of their affair would destroy Matthews's chances for the nomination, all the more for the Presidency. Matthews makes deals with various repugnant special interests for their support.

A nationwide fireside chat, broadcast live on radio and television from the Matthews's home, is intended to officially launch Grant's candidacy. Mary is supposed to give a speech introducing her husband. At the last minute, she learns that Thorndyke intervened in Detroit to sway her husband and witnesses Thorndyke telling a group of influence peddlers that she is the power behind Matthews and will continue in that role. If they have questions or further deals, they are not to bother Matthews; they are to come to her—or she will destroy them in her newspapers. Mary knew about the moral compromises Grant had made, but not the extent of Thorndyke's role. Confronted with this evidence that she has lost him forever, she refuses to give the speech and runs from the room in tears. McManus, who has grown genuinely fond of her, follows and tries to persuade her to come back and help Grant become President because the White House is the one place Thorndyke cannot follow him.

Mary begins to read the speech prepared for her. Grant, who came to the broadcast from a meeting (off camera) of local people where his one-time friends, neighbors and supporters let him have it, sees Mary succumbing to the corruption. He realizes that he has betrayed his and Mary's ideals. He steps to the microphone before the cameras, and confesses to the American people. While promising to seek bipartisan reform—and challenging the voters to vote—he denounces as frauds both his backers and himself and withdraws as a candidate. He also asks for his wife's forgiveness, and they embrace.

Thorndyke fires Spike, but Conover immediately hires him.

== Cast ==
- Spencer Tracy as Grant Matthews
- Katharine Hepburn as Mary Matthews
- Van Johnson as "Spike" MacManus
- Angela Lansbury as Kay Thorndyke
- Adolphe Menjou as Jim Conover
- Lewis Stone as Sam Thorndyke
- Howard Smith as Sam I. Parrish
- Charles Dingle as Bill Noland Hardy
- Maidel Turner as Lulubelle Alexandar
- Raymond Walburn as Judge Alexandar
- Margaret Hamilton as Norah
- Art Baker as Leith, Radio Announcer
- Pierre Watkin as Senator Lauterback
- Florence Auer as Grace Orval Draper
- Irving Bacon as Buck Swenson
- Charles Lane as Blink Moran
- Patti Brady as Joyce Matthews
- George Nokes as Grant Matthews, Jr.
- Carl "Alfalfa" Switzer as Bellboy
- Tom Fadden as Waiter
- Tom Pedi as Barber
- Edwin Cooper as Bradbury
- Frank Mayo as City Official (uncredited)

== Production ==
Actress Claudette Colbert was originally cast as Mary, the wife of Grant Matthews; disagreements with Capra led Colbert to abandon the picture. Hepburn was chosen as her replacement only days before filming began. She had been helping Tracy with the script, and so was already familiar with the part. There was tension between Adolphe Menjou and Hepburn during the filming. He was a member of the politically conservative group Motion Picture Alliance for the Preservation of American Ideals and she had allied herself with the rival Committee for the First Amendment. (Note: The conflict between Menjou and Hepburn was enough to compel Capra to keep press from the set.) During filming, Menjou testified as a friendly witness before the House Un-American Activities Committee. Many sources reported that on set, Hepburn was "cordial" to Menjou when they had scenes together but otherwise would not acknowledge him.

In order to cast Metro-Goldwyn-Mayer contract player Tracy in the film, MGM bought the distribution rights to State of the Union. While most of the major actors in the film were under contract to MGM, Capra's own company, Liberty Films produced the film.

State of the Union was originally budgeted at $2.6 million and came in $450,000 under budget. Principal photography took place between September 29 and December 6, 1947.

== Reception ==
State of the Union was reviewed by Bosley Crowther in The New York Times. He noted: "regardless of partisan reactions—and there are bound to be plenty of those, in view of the frank and intensely topical nature of the yarn—it cannot be denied that this picture which Frank Capra has made from the popular Lindsay-Crouse stage play, is a slick piece of screen satire."

Shortly after completion, State of the Union was screened exclusively for President Harry Truman and reportedly helped convince him to run for office again.

== Home media ==
Capra’s Liberty Films bought the rights of State of the Union after its initial theatrical release. After his company folded, Liberty’s assets were acquired by Paramount Pictures, which later sold most of its pre-1950 film library, including State of the Union, to the EMKA subsidiary of what is now Universal.

It has been released in the U.S. on VHS, LaserDisc, DVD, and Blu-ray and in various other territories on DVD. In 2017, French company Movinside released a remastered edition on Blu-ray and DVD. The film was later released on Blu-ray by Indicator in the U.K.

== See also ==
- Politics in fiction
- Spencer Tracy filmography
