= Remains to Be Seen (film) =

1953 film by Don Weis

- Directed by: Don Weis
- Written by: Sidney Sheldon
- Based on: Remains to Be Seen by Russel Crouse and Howard Lindsay
- Produced by: Arthur Hornblow Jr.
- Starring: June Allyson; Van Johnson; Louis Calhern; Angela Lansbury; Dorothy Dandridge
- Cinematography: Robert H. Planck
- Edited by: Cotton Warburton
- Music by: Jeff Alexander
- Production company: Metro-Goldwyn-Mayer
- Distributed by: Metro-Goldwyn-Mayer
- Release date: May 15, 1953
- Running time: 88 minutes
- Country: United States
- Language: English
- Budget: $976,000
- Box office: $939,000

Remains to Be Seen is a 1953 crime musical comedy film directed by Don Weis and starring June Allyson, Van Johnson and Louis Calhern. It is based on the 1951 Broadway play Remains to Be Seen by Russel Crouse and Howard Lindsay.

== Plot ==
A girl vocalist and her apartment manager get mixed up in a creepy Park Avenue murder and find themselves facing danger at every turn.

== Cast ==
- June Allyson as Jody Revere
- Van Johnson as Waldo Williams
- Louis Calhern as Benjamin Goodman
- Angela Lansbury as Valeska Chauvel
- John Beal as Dr. Glenson
- Dorothy Dandridge as herself
- Barry Kelley as Lt. O'Flair
- Sammy White as Ben
- Kathryn Card as Mrs. West
- Paul Harvey as Mr. Bennett
- Helene Millard as Mrs. Bennett
- Peter Chong as Ling Tan
- Charles Lane as Delapp, examiner
- Larry J. Blake as Detective Minetti
- Morgan Farley as Kyle Manning
- Howard Freeman as Clark
- Frank Nelson as Fleming
- Robert Foulk as Officer Miller
- Stuart Holmes as Travis Revercombe
- Ernö Verebes as Waiter

== Reception ==
According to MGM records, the film earned $697,000 in the US and Canada and $242,000 elsewhere, making a loss to the studio of $438,000.

== Songs ==
- "Toot, Toot, Tootsie (Goo' Bye!)" – sung and danced by June Allyson and Van Johnson
- "Taking a Chance on Love" – sung by Dorothy Dandridge
- "Too Marvelous for Words" – sung by Van Johnson, then sung by June Allyson, then reprised by Van Johnson and June Allyson
