= The Young Stranger =

- Theatrical poster
- Directed by: John Frankenheimer
- Screenplay by: Robert Dozier
- Based on: Deal a Blow; 1956 teleplay on Climax! by Robert Dozier
- Produced by: Stuart Millar
- Starring: James MacArthur
- Cinematography: Robert H. Planck
- Edited by: Edward A. Biery (as Edward Biery Jr.), Robert Swink
- Music by: Leonard Rosenman
- Distributed by: RKO Teleradio Pictures
- Release date: April 7, 1957 (New York City)
- Running time: 84 minutes
- Country: United States
- Language: English

The Young Stranger is a 1957 low-budget drama film, the directorial debut of John Frankenheimer. Starring Academy Award winning actress Kim Hunter and James MacArthur, it was based on the teleplay Deal a Blow by Robert Dozier.

== Plot ==
Teenage Hal Ditmar is the son of Helen, and a wealthy film producer, Tom Ditmar. Hal lives with his mother and father in Beverly Hills yet has a sullen, smart-aleck outlook on life. Hal gets into an argument in a movie theater, which ends with Hal hitting the theater manager. Neither the police nor Hal's father believe his claim that he acted in self-defense. When Tom discusses the matter with Sgt. Shipley, the police consider the delinquent act more serious than does the father. Tom takes Hal home and berates and punishes him. The next day, Hal is teased at school and considered a bad influence by other parents. Because Tom won't believe him, Hal questions his father's love for him. However, Hal's mother tells him that his father once told her Hal was the only thing he did love, implying that Tom did not love her. At dinner, Tom tells his son the police want to see Hal the next day, but does not tell him why. At bedtime, Helen tells Tom she has considered separation for five years. Tom tells her he loves her, but Helen leaves the bedroom. The next day, the police offer to keep Hal's transgression out of juvenile court if he will confess and apologize. Hal refuses. The theater manager drops the charges because of Tom's influence,. Asked to at least apologize, Hal continues not to. Helen apologizes for Hal after Hal storms out of the station and promises no more trouble.

Tom learns of Hal's surly behavior at the police station and threatens to ground him. Hal explodes, telling his father that he doesn't even know him and only talks to him when he's upset with him. Prohibited from driving, Hal leaves on his bicycle. Helen tells her husband that he only sees Hal at dinner and Hal doesn't even know his father loves him. Hal goes to the movie theater and apologizes to the theater manager, but wants the manager to explain to his father that it was self-defense. The manager scoffs, and the two begin scuffling which ends with Hal hitting the manager once again. Back at the police station, Hal explains to Sgt. Shipley what happened, but doubts he will believe him. Sgt. Shipley questions the manager about the first assault. The manager admits Hal acted in self-defense, but denies the second assault was self-defense. Sgt. Shipley doesn't believe the manager and asks Hal's father why he didn't believe Hal the first time. Tom says he didn't think believing Hal was important, and realizes he was wrong. Tom tells his son about the manager's admission, and tells Hal he's glad he hit the manager and not him. They leave the police station with Mr. Ditmar putting his arm around his son Hal.

== Cast ==
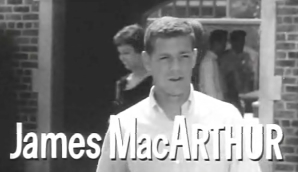
James MacArthur in the trailer for The Young Stranger

- James MacArthur as Hal Ditmar
- James Daly as Tom Ditmar
- Kim Hunter as Helen Ditmar
- James Gregory as Sgt. Shipley
- Whit Bissell as Theater Manager

== See also ==
- List of American films of 1957
