= Kym Karath =

American actress (born 1958)

- Born: August 4, 1958 (age 68)
- Education: University of Southern California
- Occupation: Actress
- Years active: 1963–1981; 1988
- Spouses: Philippe L'Equilbec (m. 1985; div. 2005); Jeff Apple (m. 2016)
- Children: 1

Kym Karath (born August 4, 1958) is an American former actress. She is best known for her role as Gretl, the youngest of the Von Trapp children in The Sound of Music.

== Career ==
In 1963, Karath appeared in The Thrill of It All. The following year, she appeared in Good Neighbor Sam. In The Sound of Music, Karath played the youngest child, Gretl Von Trapp.

== Personal life ==
Karath graduated from the University of Southern California with a degree in humanities, and shortly after that she moved to Paris, France, where she studied art history and modeled. At age 26, Karath married Philippe L'Equibec; their son was born in 1991. Thereafter, she left acting for a while and lived in Greenwich, Connecticut, before resuming acting in 2005.

Karath has said that she is not fond of water after nearly drowning in the boat scene in The Sound of Music, as Karath could not swim.

== Filmography ==
=== Film ===
Year	Title	Role	Notes
1963	Spencer's Mountain	Pattie-Cake Spencer	Uncredited
1963	The Thrill of It All	Maggie Boyer	
1964	Good Neighbor Sam	Denise Bissell	Uncredited
1965	The Sound of Music	Gretl Von Trapp	
1969	How We Feel About Sound	Schoolgirl (voice)	Educational film

=== Television ===
Year	Title	Role	Notes
1965	Peyton Place	Susan	1 episode
1965	My Three Sons	Pammy	1 episode
1966	On The Run	the girls on the train	Un-sold pilot episode
1966	Dr. Kildare	Margaret Hanson	2 episodes
1966	Lassie	Kathy Vaughn	1 episode
1966	Lost in Space	Princess	1 episode
1966	Family Affair	Barbara	3 episodes
1970	Family Affair	Wynn Catter	Episode: "Goodbye, Mrs. Beasley"
1970	All My Children	Kristen	unknown episodes
1972	The Brady Bunch	Kerry Hathaway	1 episode
1973	The Waltons	Mabel	1 episode
1980	Archie Bunker's Place	Pretty Girl	1 episode
1981	Midnight Offerings	Monique	TV movie, (final film role)
