= Spencer's Mountain =

1963 film by Delmer Daves

- Theatrical release poster
- Directed by: Delmer Daves
- Screenplay by: Delmer Daves
- Based on: Spencer's Mountain; 1961 novel by Earl Hamner Jr.
- Produced by: Delmer Daves
- Starring: Henry Fonda; Maureen O'Hara; James MacArthur; Donald Crisp; Wally Cox; Mimsy Farmer
- Cinematography: Charles Lawton Jr. A.S.C. H.F. Koenekamp, A.S.C. (second unit)
- Edited by: David Wages
- Music by: Max Steiner
- Production company: Warner Bros. Pictures
- Distributed by: Warner Bros. Pictures
- Release date: May 16, 1963
- Running time: 118 minutes
- Country: United States
- Language: English
- Box office: $4.5 million (rentals)

Spencer's Mountain is a 1963 American family drama film written, directed and produced by Delmer Daves, from the 1961 novel of the same name by Earl Hamner Jr., and starring Henry Fonda and Maureen O'Hara. The supporting cast features early appearances by James MacArthur, Veronica Cartwright and Victor French, while longtime film actor Donald Crisp (in his final screen role) portrays "Grandpa" Spencer. Wally Cox, Virginia Gregg, Lillian Bronson, Whit Bissell and Dub Taylor also appear.

The movie, although set in Wyoming, is an inspiration for the long-running CBS television series The Waltons (set in the eastern U.S., in the Appalachian, Allegheny and Blue Ridge mountain chain and the upper southern Shenandoah Valley of western Virginia).

== Plot ==
As the patriarch of a large and growing family that resides in the Grand Teton Mountains in Wyoming during the early 1960s, dirt-poor sawmill worker Clay Spencer is fiercely independent yet dedicated to his family. He navigates issues of religion and education to eke out a brighter future for his offspring.

Clay Sr. is the oldest of eight boisterous brothers, all of whom live within visiting distance (and apparently all single). Clay's elderly parents also live nearby on the mountain, named "Spencer's Mountain", after their pioneer family.

Hardworking wife Olivia is loving and faithful, kept busy with household tasks and contending with her husband's rough-hewn ways, which include periodic drinking sprees in town and a vocal refusal to attend his wife's local church services.

Eldest son "Clay-Boy" aspires to attend college and build a career away from the mountain. To do so, he must earn a scholarship and be approved and admitted by university officials. He fears that his unpolished family, particularly father Clay Sr., may hinder his pursuits.

Clay-Boy must also contend with the amorous pursuits of teenage neighbor Clarissa, daughter of the wealthy local mill owner Col. Coleman, who employs Clay Sr. and acts as de facto power figure of the mountain community. Clarissa's amorous campaign with the Spencer boy includes several brazen attempts to seduce Clay-Boy, brazen enough for folks who observe several incidents to draw comparisons to barnyard animals in heat.

Meanwhile, since his marriage to Olivia, Clay Sr. has dreamed of building a spacious house farther up on the mountaintop for the two in which to retire. Periodically, he breaks away from work to continue the long building process on this house, using building materials that he has been able to assemble with great effort and sacrifice. However, after ten or more years, the mountaintop house remains mostly an unfinished frame.

Eventually, Clay-Boy wards off the attentions of Clarissa, and completes an independent-study tutoring course in Latin (required for his particular type of scholarship). His admission to the state university is approved, but Clay Sr. realizes that the family cannot afford both his longtime dream house and sending his son to college. As a result, he decides to sell the mountain house property to direct the profits to Clay-Boy's college expenses, and sadly torches the unfinished structure of lumber framing.

Olivia is shocked by Clay's actions and assumes that he must be delirious with grief at the loss of the house. He responds with a laugh, telling her that the house had indeed been his dream, but insignificant when compared to the chance of sending their son to college. In the end, Clay-Boy is admitted to college and bids farewell to his family.

== Cast ==
- Henry Fonda as Clay Spencer
- Maureen O'Hara as Olivia Spencer
- James MacArthur as "Clay-Boy" / Clay Spencer Jr.
- Donald Crisp as Grandpa Spencer
- Wally Cox as Preacher Goodman
- Mimsy Farmer as Claris Coleman
- Virginia Gregg as Miss Parker
- Lillian Bronson as Grandma Spencer
- Whit Bissell as Dr. Campbell
- Hayden Rorke as Colonel Coleman
- Kathy Bennett as Minnie-Cora Cook
- Dub Taylor as Percy Cook
- Hope Summers as Mother Ida
- Ken Mayer as Mr. John

=== Unbilled ===
- Susan Young as Shirley Spencer
- Gary Young as Mat Spencer
- Michael Young as Mark Spencer
- Ricky Young as Luke Spencer
- Rocky Young as John Spencer
- Veronica Cartwright as Becky Spencer
- Kym Karath as Pattie-Cake Spencer
- Barbara McNair as graduation singer
- Mike Henry as Spencer brother
- Victor French as Spencer brother
- Larry D. Mann as Spencer brother
- Med Flory as Spencer brother
- Michael Greene as Spencer brother
- Jim O'Hara as Spencer brother
- Bronwyn FitzSimons (Maureen O'Hara's daughter) as Dean Beck's secretary
- Rory Mallinson as campus cop

== Production ==
Spencer's Mountain takes place in Wyoming's Teton Range (site of a nearby famous National Park) of the Rocky Mountains in the western United States, as photographed by cinematographer Charles Lawton Jr., in color using Panavision. It was filmed in and around the mountain valley town of Jackson, and features the nearby Chapel of the Transfiguration.

Although the original 1961 Hamner novel is set in the Blue Ridge Mountains of western Virginia, creator and author Earl Hamner Jr. said in 1963 that producer, director and screenwriter Delmer Daves wanted more physically imposing mountains to emphasize the characters' isolation and struggles with their environment.

The 1961 novel and the 1963 film became the basis for the long-running television series The Waltons, which premiered in 1972. The series restored the setting from the film's Wyoming to the novel's original Virginia, and placed the action in 1933, during the beginnings of the Great Depression. The series also differed from both the film and novel by playing down adult themes, including alcoholism and infidelity in its early seasons episodes, until it became established and more secure in its popularity in the mid-to-late 1970s.

Spencer's Mountain was the second of three films co-starring Henry Fonda and Maureen O'Hara. Twenty years earlier, they starred in the 1943 war drama film Immortal Sergeant (set in the then current Second World War's North African invasion and campaign) and then, ten years after the making of Spencer's Mountain, they played the leads again in the 1973 made-for-television film adaptation of The Red Pony, taken from famous author John Steinbeck's earlier 1937 novel The Red Pony, also directed and co-written by earlier Spencer's Mountain second unit director Robert Totten (1937–1995).

== Reception ==
In May 1963, The New York Times critic Bosley Crowther contrasted the "slicked up...synthetic and essentially insincere" film with the original text and plot of the novel, "[which] tells a very real and very moving story of a dirt-poor family that lives in the hard-scrabble, unglamorous mountains of southwest Virginia."

A review in the Pittsburgh Post-Gazette daily newspaper in July 1963 noted that the location photography, at Grand Teton National Park, is "vast and beautiful", but the screenplay was basically a soap opera with excessive sentimentality with no restraint; there was "too much talk" and "a general falseness about what could be a moving truth".

Film critic Judith Crist, writing in the New York Herald Tribune, criticized the adult aspects of the movie's plot, saying it showed "sheer prurience and perverted morality", and added that "it makes the nudie shows at the Rialto look like Walt Disney productions".
