= Jean Adair =

Canadian actress

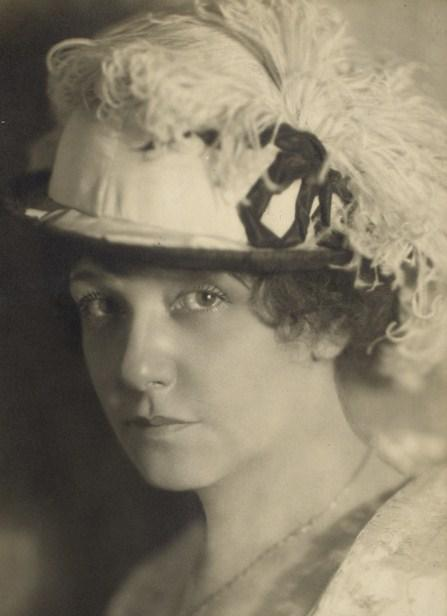
- Jean Adair
- Born: Violet McNaughton; June 13, 1873; Hamilton, Ontario, Canada
- Died: May 11, 1953 (aged 79); New York City, U.S.
- Other names: Jennet Adair
- Occupation: Actress
- Years active: 1922–1953

Jean Adair (born Violet McNaughton; June 13, 1873 – May 11, 1953) was a Canadian actress. She was also known as Jennet Adair.

== Career ==
Born Violet McNaughton in Hamilton, Ontario, her work as Jennet Adair in vaudeville included performing as a "singing comedienne".

Adair received a scholarship for a dramatic school course, after which she acted for two years with stock theater companies. She moved from stock performances to replacing Irene Dunne in a production of Mother, and her New York debut came in September 1922 when she acted in It's a Boy at the Sam H. Harris Theatre.

In 1931, Adair appeared in the Summer stock cast at the Elitch Theatre.

She worked primarily on stage but also made several film appearances late in her career, most notably as Aunt Martha, one of Cary Grant's dotty old aunts in Arsenic and Old Lace, a role she originated on Broadway. Her final performance was as the beloved matriarch Rebecca Nurse in the original production of The Crucible. Like many stage actresses of her era, she also appeared in vaudeville.

== Death ==
She died at Beth Israel Hospital in New York City on May 11, 1953, aged 79. She was cremated at Ferncliff Crematory in Hartsdale, New York. Her ashes were collected by playwright Howard Lindsay.

== Broadway productions ==
- It's a Boy! (1922-?)
- The Jay Walker (1926)
- Devils (1926)
- The Good Fellow (1926)
- Machinal (1928) (*with a young unknown Clark Gable)
- That Ferguson Family (1928-9)
- Scarlet Pages (1929)
- Everything's Jake (1930)
- Rock Me, Julie (1931)
- Blessed Event (1932)
- Best Years (1932)
- Black Sheep (1932)
- The Show Off (1932-3)
- For Services Rendered (1933)
- Murder at the Vanities (1933-4)
- Broomsticks, Amen! (1934)
- Picnic (1934-?)
- Mid-West (1936-?)
- Sun Kissed (1937-?)
- On Borrowed Time (1938)
- Morning's at Seven (1939–40)
- Goodbye in the Night (1940)
- Arsenic and Old Lace (1941-4)
- Star-Spangled Family (1945)
- The Next Half Hour (1945)
- Detective Story (1949–50)
- Bell, Book and Candle (1950-1)
- The Crucible (1953)

== Filmography ==
Film
Year	Title	Role	Notes
1933	Advice to the Lovelorn	Mrs. Prentiss	Uncredited
1944	Arsenic and Old Lace	Aunt Martha Brewster	
1947	Living in a Big Way	Abigail Morgan	
1947	Something in the Wind	Aunt Mary Collins	
1948	The Naked City	Little Old Lady	Uncredited
