= The Thrill of It All (film) =

1963 film by Norman Jewison

- Theatrical release poster
- Directed by: Norman Jewison
- Screenplay by: Carl Reiner
- Story by: Larry Gelbart; Carl Reiner
- Produced by: Ross Hunter; Martin Melcher
- Starring: Doris Day; James Garner; Arlene Francis; Edward Andrews; Elliott Reid; Reginald Owen; ZaSu Pitts
- Cinematography: Russell Metty
- Edited by: Milton Carruth
- Music by: Frank De Vol
- Distributed by: Universal-International
- Release date: July 17, 1963
- Running time: 108 minutes
- Country: United States
- Language: English
- Budget: $2.5 million
- Box office: $11.8 million

The Thrill of It All is a 1963 American romantic comedy film directed by Norman Jewison and starring Doris Day and James Garner, with a supporting cast featuring Arlene Francis, Edward Andrews, Elliott Reid, Reginald Owen, and ZaSu Pitts. Shot in Eastmancolor, the film follows a suburban housewife who suddenly rises to fame as the spokeswoman for a soap company, though her husband struggles to adjust to her newfound stardom.

The screenplay was written by Carl Reiner from a story by Larry Gelbart and Reiner. Reiner had originally conceived the project for Judy Holliday, who developed cancer and had to bow out of the project, according to Reiner's reminiscence during his videotaped "Archive of American Television" interview.

== Plot ==
Suburban housewife Beverly Boyer is happily married to Gerald, a successful Manhattan obstetrician and devoted family man. One evening, the Boyers are invited to a dinner party at the home of Mrs. Fraleigh, a patient whom Gerald helped finally become pregnant. There, they meet Mrs. Fraleigh's father-in-law, Tom Fraleigh, who owns the Happy Soap company, and Beverly shares a humorous story of how Happy Soap "saved her life" involving her children. Dissatisfied with the latest Happy Soap television commercial and captivated by Beverly's enthusiasm, Tom offers Beverly the opportunity to appear in a live commercial for Happy Soap during a television play, telling her story just as she told Tom.

A nervous Beverly makes a fool of herself during her first live commercial, but after viewers and critics rave about her authenticity and natural charm, advertising executive Mike Palmer informs Beverly that Tom has offered her a one-year $80,000 contract (approximately $840,000 in 2025) to star in weekly TV commercials for Happy Soap. As Beverly unexpectedly becomes a TV sensation, Gerald resents the fact that her busy schedule has been keeping her away from home. He also becomes jealous of the level of attention that Beverly's newfound stardom has brought her, and their marriage slowly deteriorates.

One evening, Gerald reaches a breaking point when he accidentally drives and sinks his car into a swimming pool that Happy Soap had installed in the Boyers' backyard that afternoon without Beverly's knowledge. After an angry confrontation between the pair, in which Gerald complains that his position as breadwinner of the family is being threatened by Beverly's wealth, he walks out with an ultimatum that she must choose either her career or their marriage. After consulting a psychiatrist, Gerald returns home and tricks Beverly into believing that he is having an affair with another woman. Beverly falls for the ruse and quickly becomes jealous.

After a disastrous television appearance, Beverly hopes to reconcile with Gerald and expects him at a Happy Soap party that night. When Mrs. Fraleigh goes into labor, Beverly accompanies the Fraleighs to the hospital. Gerald arrives at the party shortly afterwards, and Mike offers him a ride to the hospital. However, the two parties take different routes; while Gerald arrives at the hospital, the Fraleighs and Beverly get stuck in traffic. With the help of a mounted police officer, Gerald reaches his patient just in time and, with Beverly's assistance, delivers Mrs. Fraleigh's daughter in the back seat of the couple's Rolls-Royce. Beverly and Gerald reconcile, and she gives up stardom to return to her life as a housewife and mother.

== Cast ==
- Doris Day as Beverly Boyer
- James Garner as Dr. Gerald Boyer
- Arlene Francis as Mrs. Fraleigh
- Edward Andrews as Gardiner Fraleigh
- Reginald Owen as Old Tom Fraleigh
- ZaSu Pitts as Olivia
- Elliott Reid as Mike Palmer
- Alice Pearce as Irving's wife
- Kym Karath as Maggie Boyer
- Brian Nash as Andy Boyer
- Lucy Landau as Mrs. Goethe
- Paul Hartman as Dr. Taylor
- Burt Mustin as Sidney, the Fraleighs' butler
- William Bramley as the angry driver

Carl Reiner, one of the two screenwriters of the film, makes brief appearances as a character actor appearing on TV in various roles (World War II German Officer / Cad / Western Gunslinger).

== Production ==
The film was announced in 1962. Hunter wanted to reunite Nelson Eddy and Jeanette MacDonald by having them play supporting roles. Principal photography began on October 2, 1962, in New York City, with additional filming taking place at Revue Studios, the television production facility located on the Universal Pictures backlot in Universal City, California.

Doris Day and James Garner played the leads as a married couple in another theatrical film later that same year titled Move Over, Darling, a remake of the Irene Dunne–Cary Grant film My Favorite Wife (1940). The Thrill of It All and Move Over, Darling were almost equally huge box-office hits, with the first film released in July and the second opening on Christmas Day.

== Reception ==
The Thrill of It All was the 16th highest-grossing of 1963, grossing $11.8 million in the United States. It earned $6 million in US theatrical rentals.

Garner wrote the film was "better than it should have been... because of Doris."

On the review aggregator website Rotten Tomatoes, the film holds an approval rating of 89% based on nine reviews, with an average rating of 6.3/10.

== See also ==
- List of American films of 1963
