= Mosby's Marauders =

- Written by: Harold Swanton
- Directed by: Michael O'Herlihy
- Starring: James MacArthur; Nick Adams; Jack Ging; Kurt Russell; Peggy Lipton; Donald Harron; Jeanne Cooper
- Music by: George Bruns
- Country of origin: United States
- Original language: English

Production
- Producer: Bill Anderson
- Cinematography: Frank V. Phillips
- Editors: Robert Stafford; Cotton Warburton
- Running time: 80 minutes
- Production company: Walt Disney Productions

Original release
- Release: March 17, 1967

Mosby's Marauders is a 1967 American film about the raids by John S. Mosby during the US Civil War. It was originally filmed for US television under the title Willie and the Yank: The Mosby Raiders. Mosby's Marauders was later released through VHS on February 2, 1987.

== Cast ==
- James MacArthur as Henry Jenkins
- Nick Adams as Sgt. Gregg
- Jack Ging as John S. Mosby
- Kurt Russell as Willie Prentiss
- Peggy Lipton as Oralee Prentiss
- Donald Harron as Brig. Gen. Edwin H. Stoughton
- Jeanne Cooper as Ma Prentiss
- James T. Callahan as Sam Chapman
- Robert Sorrells as Pvt. Starkey
- E.J. Andre as Uncle Fred
- Michael Forest as Gen. J.E.B. Stuart
- Steve Raines as Sgt. Maddux
- Michael Pate as Capt. Blazer
- Michael Kearney as Homer Prentiss
- Robert Random as Pvt. Lomax
