= Alison Smith (critic) =

American movie and theatre critic and author (1892–1943)

Alison Smith (c. 1892 – January 7, 1943) was an American movie and theatre critic and author.

Smith was born in Yolo County, California and came to New York in 1913. Smith wrote for The Craftsman, The New York Globe, the New York Evening Mail, and the New York World.

She was married to playwright Russel Crouse. She died on January 7, 1943, at her home in New York at age 50.
