= Remains to Be Seen (play) =

1951 play by Howard Lindsay and Russel Crouse

- Original language: English
- Written by: Howard Lindsay and Russel Crouse
- Genre: Comedy

Premiere
- Date: October 3, 1951
- Place: Morosco Theatre

Remains to Be Seen is a play written by Howard Lindsay and Russel Crouse. Producer Leland Hayward opened it on Broadway at the Morosco Theatre on October 3, 1951. Bretaigne Windust directed the production, which ran for 199 performances.

The play is a comedy about the investigation of the murder of an anti-pornography crusader. Following his death, various characters gather at his Park Avenue apartment, including his niece Jody, his attorney, his butler, the apartment building's young janitor, and a doctor. In the process, the attorney falls in love with Jody, but she chooses to leave with the janitor instead.

== Cast and characters ==
The characters and opening night cast from the Broadway production are given below:

Opening night cast
Character	Broadway cast
Jody Revere	Janis Paige
Waldo Walton	Jackie Cooper
Benjamin Goodman	Howard Lindsay
Hideo Hayakawa	Harry Shaw Lowe
Valeska Chauvel	Madeleine Morka
Dr. Charles Gresham	Warner Anderson
Mrs. Bright	Edith Bell
Patrolman Johnson	John Bouie
Detective Watson	Jonathan Brewster
Lieutenant Casey	Kirk Brown, Jr.
Tony Minetti	Frank Campanella
Al (the Porter)	Ossie Davis
Detective Weiner	Lew Herbert
Dr. Chester Delapp	Ross Hertz
Fred Fleming	Joseph Latham
Morris Rosenberg	Paul Lipson
Detective Davis	Alexander Lockwood
Edward Miller	Karl Lukas
Robert Clark	Hugh Rennie

== Adaptations ==
Metro-Goldwyn-Mayer adapted the play as a film of the same name in 1953, directed by Don Weis. June Allyson starred as Jody.
