= Benjamin Appel =

American novelist

- Born: September 13, 1907; New York City, New York
- Died: April 3, 1977 (aged 69); Roosevelt, New Jersey
- Occupations: Author of detective and crime fiction
- Spouse: Sophie Marshak (m. 1936)
- Writing career
- Language: English
- Notable works: The Raw Edge (1958); The Funhouse, a.k.a. The Death Master (1959); A Big Man, A Fast Man (1961); A Time of Fortune (1963); The Devil and W. Kaspar (1977); Brain Guy / Plunder (2005)

Benjamin Appel (September 13, 1907 – April 3, 1977) was an American novelist specializing in detective and crime fiction, sometimes from a radical perspective.

Appel was born in New York City to Louis Appel and Bessie (née Mikofsky) and grew up in the Hell's Kitchen neighborhood. He drew on this experience when writing his novels. He was educated at the University of Pennsylvania and New York University from 1925 to 1927, earning a B.S. from Lafayette College in 1929.

Before he began earning a living from his writing, he was a bank clerk, farmer, lumberjack, factory-hand and housing inspector for New York City.

Appel married Sophie Marshak in 1936; they had three daughters.

He lived most of his life in Roosevelt, New Jersey, and died there in 1977.

== Works ==
Maxim Lieber was Appel's literary agent in 1933 and 1935.

- Brain Guy, a.k.a. The Enforcer (1934)
- Four Roads to Death, a.k.a. Gold and Flesh (1935)
- Runaround (1937)
- The Power-House (1939)
- The Dark Stain (1943)
- But Not Yet Slain (1947)
- Fortress in the Rice (1951)
- Hell's Kitchen, a.k.a. Alley Kids (1952)
- Plunder (1952)
- Dock Walloper (1953)
- Sweet Money Girl (1954)
- Life and Death of a Tough Guy, a.k.a. Teen-Age Mobster (1955)
- We Were There in the Klondike Gold Rush (1956)
- The Raw Edge (1958, with cover photo by David Attie)
- The Funhouse, a.k.a. The Death Master (1959)
- A Big Man, A Fast Man (1961)
- A Time of Fortune (1963)
- The Devil and W. Kaspar (1977)
- Brain Guy / Plunder (2005)
