= Arsenic and Old Lace (film) =

1944 film by Frank Capra

- Theatrical release poster
- Directed by: Frank Capra
- Screenplay by: Julius J. Epstein; Philip G. Epstein
- Based on: Arsenic and Old Lace by Joseph Kesselring
- Produced by: Frank Capra; Jack L. Warner
- Starring: Cary Grant; Raymond Massey; Jack Carson; Priscilla Lane; Peter Lorre; Edward Everett Horton; James Gleason; Josephine Hull; Jean Adair; John Alexander
- Cinematography: Sol Polito
- Edited by: Daniel Mandell
- Music by: Max Steiner
- Distributed by: Warner Bros. Pictures
- Release dates: September 1, 1944 (New York City); September 23, 1944 (United States)
- Running time: 118 minutes
- Country: United States
- Language: English
- Budget: $1.2 million
- Box office: $4.8 million

Arsenic and Old Lace is a 1944 American screwball black comedy crime film directed by Frank Capra and starring Cary Grant. The screenplay by Julius J. Epstein and Philip G. Epstein is based on the 1941 play by Joseph Kesselring. The contract with the play's producers stipulated that the film not be released until the Broadway run ended. The original planned release date was September 30, 1942. The play was hugely successful, running for three and a half years, so the film was not released until 1944.

The lead role of Mortimer Brewster was originally intended for Bob Hope, but he could not be released from his contract with Paramount Pictures. Capra had also approached Jack Benny and Richard Travis before learning that Grant would accept the role. On the Broadway stage, Boris Karloff played Jonathan Brewster, who is said to "look like Boris Karloff". According to Turner Classic Movies, Karloff, who gave permission for the use of his name in the film, remained in the play to appease the producers, who were afraid of what stripping the play of all its primary cast would do to ticket sales. Raymond Massey took Karloff's place on screen. (Note: As stated in an episode of This Is Your Life, Karloff was actually an investor and a producer of the stage play who received royalties whenever it was performed.) The film's supporting cast also features Jack Carson, Priscilla Lane, Peter Lorre, and Edward Everett Horton.

Josephine Hull and Jean Adair portray the Brewster sisters, Abby and Martha, respectively. Hull and Adair, as well as John Alexander (who played Teddy Brewster), reprised their roles from the 1941 stage production. Hull and Adair both received an eight-week leave of absence from the stage production, which was still running, but Karloff did not. He was an investor in the stage production and its main draw. The entire film was shot within those eight weeks. The film cost just over $1.2 million of a $2 million budget to produce. The cost of the filming rights was $175,000.

== Plot ==
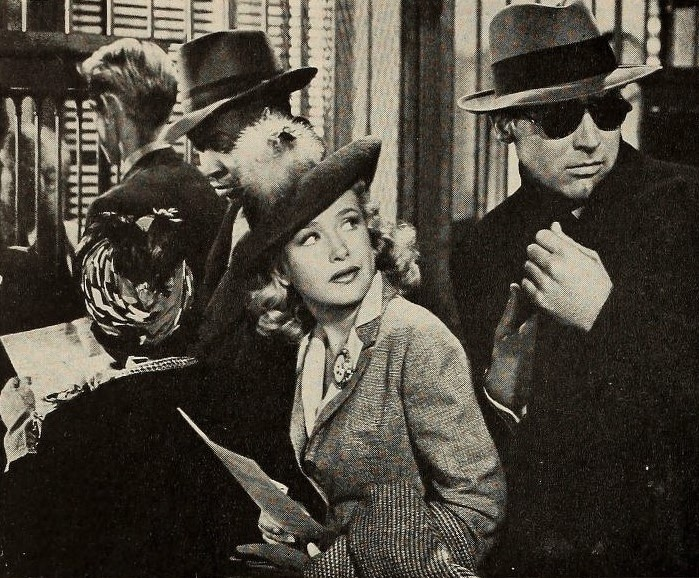
Elaine (Priscilla Lane) and Mortimer (Cary Grant) waiting for a marriage license

The Brewster family of Brooklyn is descended from Mayflower settlers who "scalped the Indians" instead of the other way around, according to Mortimer Brewster. On Halloween day, Mortimer, a theater critic and author who has repeatedly denounced marriage as "an old-fashioned superstition", marries Elaine Harper, his neighbor and a minister's daughter. Before leaving for their Niagara Falls honeymoon, Elaine goes to her father's house to share the news of her marriage, while Mortimer informs his aunts, Abby and Martha, who raised him in the old family home. Mortimer's delusional younger brother, Teddy, who believes he is Theodore Roosevelt, resides with them. Frequently, while running upstairs, Teddy blows a bugle and yells "Charge!", imitating Roosevelt's 1898 charge up San Juan Hill.

Searching for the notes for his next book, Mortimer finds a corpse hidden in the window seat. He assumes in horror that Teddy's delusions have led him to murder. Abby and Martha cheerfully confess to killing Mr. Hoskins, explaining that they minister to lonely old bachelors by ending their "suffering". They post a "Room for Rent" sign to attract a suitable subject for their "charity", then serve a glass of elderberry wine spiked with arsenic, strychnine, and cyanide. Including Mr. Hoskins, the aunts have murdered twelve men; the bodies are buried in the cellar by Teddy, who believes they are yellow fever victims at the Panama Canal. Teddy moves Mr. Hoskins from the window seat down to the cellar.

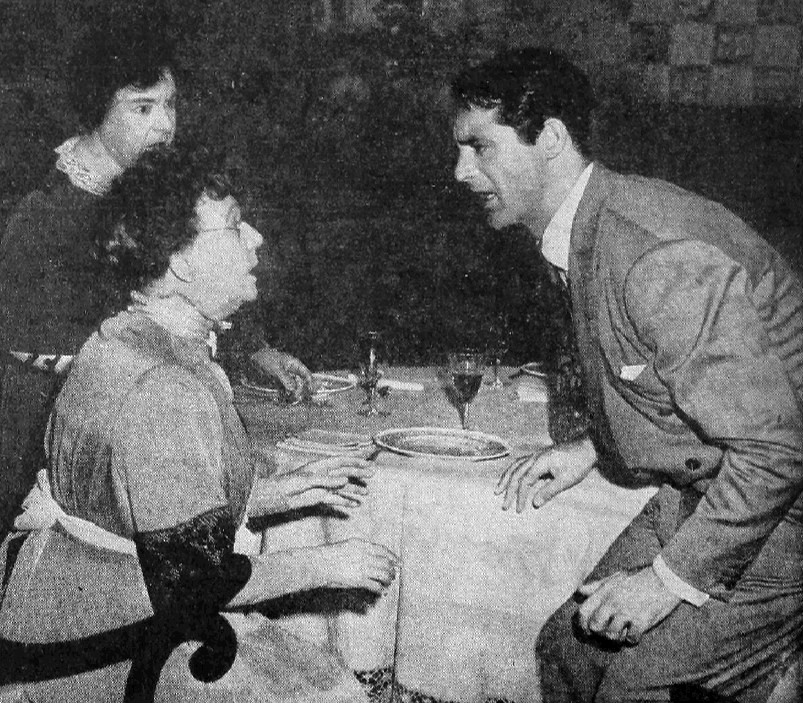
Jean Adair, Josephine Hull, and Cary Grant in Arsenic and Old Lace

To protect his aunts in case the bodies are discovered, Mortimer frantically leaves to file paperwork to have Teddy legally committed to the Happy Dale mental asylum. In Mortimer's absence, his older brother, Jonathan, arrives with his alcoholic accomplice, plastic surgeon Dr. Herman Einstein. Altered by Einstein while drunk, Jonathan's face resembles Boris Karloff's Frankenstein appearance. (Note: The self-referential joke highlights Karloff's portrayal of the character in the Broadway production.) Jonathan is a serial killer with a body count of twelve, fleeing from the police, and intending to dispose of his latest murder victim, Mr. Spenalzo.

Shortly after Jonathan and Einstein hide Spenalzo's body in the window seat, Mortimer returns; discovering the corpse, he demands that the pair leave. However, the two criminals reveal they have found Mr. Hoskins' body in the cellar. Mortimer rushes out to obtain a second signature for Teddy's commitment papers. Learning his aunts' secret and mocked by Einstein for their equivalent victim tally, Jonathan determines to increase his body count by killing Mortimer. Meanwhile, Mortimer visits Elaine, expressing his reservations about their marriage due to his family's insanity.

When Mortimer returns, Einstein offers him a chance to leave, distracting him while Jonathan takes Spenalzo to the cellar. Mortimer decries the stupidity of characters in plays who are aware that they are in a house with killers but fail to realize the danger. Sneaking up from behind, Jonathan ties up and gags Mortimer. While Jonathan and Einstein argue about killing Mortimer, Officer O'Hara arrives in response to complaints from neighbors regarding Teddy's bugle blasts. After Einstein claims that Mortimer is enacting a scene from a play, O'Hara excitedly recites the plot of the play he is writing. Jonathan prepares to kill O'Hara but is knocked out by Einstein.

O'Hara's partners arrive looking for the overdue O'Hara; mistaking an imminent arrest, Jonathan discloses the thirteen bodies buried in the cellar. Lieutenant Rooney arrives looking for the errant officers; recognizing Jonathan from "Wanted" posters as an escapee from an Indiana mental asylum, he arrests Jonathan, discounting his claim. When Mr. Witherspoon comes to take Teddy to Happy Dale, Abby and Martha insist on joining him. Einstein flees after signing the aunts' commitment papers.

After Mortimer signs the papers as next of kin, the aunts inform him that he is not actually a Brewster; his mother was the family cook and his father was a chef on a steamship. Ecstatic, Mortimer rushes to find Elaine, who is horrified after discovering the corpses in the cellar. Before Elaine can exclaim about the bodies in the presence of others, Mortimer silences her by kissing her and whisking her off on their honeymoon.

== Cast ==
- Cary Grant as Mortimer Brewster
- Priscilla Lane as Elaine Harper
- Raymond Massey as Jonathan Brewster
- Jack Carson as Officer Patrick O'Hara
- Edward Everett Horton as Mr. Witherspoon
- Peter Lorre as Dr. Herman Einstein
- James Gleason as Police Lt. Rooney
- Josephine Hull as Abby Brewster
- Jean Adair as Martha Brewster
- John Alexander as "Teddy Roosevelt" Brewster
- Grant Mitchell as Reverend Harper
- Edward McNamara as Police Sgt. Brophy
- Garry Owen as taxi cab driver
- John Ridgely as Officer Sanders
- Vaughan Glaser as Judge Cullman
- Chester Clute as Dr. Gilchrist
- Charles Lane as reporter
- Edward McWade as Gibbs
- Hank Mann as photographer at marriage license office (uncredited)
- Spencer Charters as marriage license clerk (uncredited)

== Background ==
The play Arsenic and Old Lace was written by Joseph Kesselring, son of German immigrants and a former professor at Bethel College, a pacifist Mennonite college. It was written in the anti-war atmosphere of the late 1930s. Capra scholar Matthew C. Gunter argues that the deep theme of both the play and film is the United States' difficulty in coming to grips with both the positive and negative consequences of the liberty it professes to uphold, and which the Brewsters demand. Although their house is the nicest in the street, there are 12 bodies in the basement. That inconsistency is a metaphor for the country's struggle to reconcile the violence of much of its past with the pervasive myths about its role as a beacon of freedom.

The set used for the Brewster home in Arsenic and Old Lace was reused in the 1942 film George Washington Slept Here. To ensure it looked the part of a dilapidated farmhouse in the latter film, Warner Bros. crews knocked out bannisters, rafters and floors on the set.

== Reception ==
=== Box office ===
Trailer (1944)

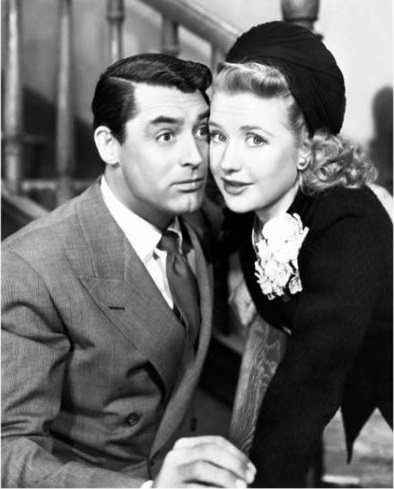
Publicity photo of Grant and Lane

According to Warner Bros. records, the film grossed $2,836,000 domestically and $1,948,000 internationally.

=== Critical response ===
The contemporary critical reviews were uniformly positive. The New York Times critic summed up the majority view, "As a whole, Arsenic and Old Lace, the Warner picture which came to the Strand yesterday, is good macabre fun." Variety declared, "Capra's production, not elaborate, captures the color and spirit of the play, while the able writing team of Julius J. and Philip G. Epstein has turned in a very workable, tightly-compressed script. Capra's own intelligent direction rounds out." Harrison's Reports wrote: "An hilarious entertainment, it should turn out to be one of the year's top box-office attractions." John Lardner of The New Yorker called the film "practically as funny in picture form as it did on the stage, and that is very funny indeed."

Assessing the film in 1968, Charles Higham and Joel Greenberg state in Hollywood in the Forties that "Frank Capra provided a rather overstated and strained version of Arsenic and Old Lace". Pauline Kael was not enthusiastic: "Capra's hick jollity turns Grant into a manic eunuch ... The villains—murderers who are less couth in their methods than the innocently mad aunts—are Peter Lorre, as himself, and Raymond Massey, impersonating Boris Karloff; some people roar at their antics." Leonard Maltin gave it three and a half of four stars: "Frantic cast is excellent, especially Lorre and Massey as unsuspecting murderers holed up in Brooklyn household." Leslie Halliwell gave it three of four stars: "A model of stage play adaptations, this famous black farce provided a frenzy of hilarious activity, and its flippant attitude to death was better received in wartime than would have been the case earlier or later. The director coaxes some perfect if overstated performances from his star cast, and added his own flair for perpetuating a hubbub."

On the review aggregator website Rotten Tomatoes, the film holds an approval rating of 86% based on 35 reviews, with an average rating of 7.7/10.

The film is recognized by American Film Institute in AFI's 100 Years...100 Laughs (No. 30) in 2000.

== Radio adaptations ==
Arsenic and Old Lace was adapted as a half-hour radio play for the November 25, 1946, broadcast of The Screen Guild Theater with Boris Karloff and Eddie Albert. A one-hour adaptation was broadcast on January 25, 1948, on Ford Theatre, with Josephine Hull, Jean Adair, and John Alexander reprising their roles.

== See also ==
- The Lamp in Assassin Mews - A black comedy about an elderly couple who are serial killers
- List of American films of 1944
- List of films set around Halloween
- Amy Archer-Gilligan – a nursing home owner accused of murdering elderly men in her care 1910–1917
- Black Widow murders – a real murder case whose events were compared to the fictional murders in the film
