= State of the Union (play) =

Play written by Howard Lindsay

- Cover of the production's Broadway Playbill
- Written by: Russel Crouse; Howard Lindsay
- Characters: Grant Matthews; Mary Matthews; Spike McManus; Kay Thorndyke; Jim Conover; Sam Thorndyke; Sam I. Parrish; Bill Nolard Hardy; Lulubelle Alexander; Judge Alexander
- Original language: English
- Genre: Comedy
- Setting: Conover's home, Washington, D.C.; Book-Cadillac Hotel, Detroit

Premiere
- Date premiered: November 14, 1945
- Place premiered: Hudson Theatre; New York City, New York

State of the Union is a play by American playwrights Russel Crouse and Howard Lindsay about a fictional Republican presidential candidate.

== Productions ==
State of the Union opened at the National Theatre in Washington, DC on November 6, 1945. The New York Times reviewer noted that the play was "clever and well-acted."

The play premiered on Broadway at the Hudson Theatre on November 14, 1945, and closed on September 13, 1947, after 765 performances. Directed by Bretaigne Windust, the cast starred Ralph Bellamy (Grant Matthews), Ruth Hussey (Mary Matthews), Margalo Gillmore (Kay Thorndyke), Myron McCormick (Spike MacManus), and Minor Watson (James Conover). It marked the debut of actor Ernest Borgnine, who played a small role.

Both playwrights received the 1946 Pulitzer Prize for Drama. John L. Toohey commented: "In Awarding the Pulitzer Prize to 'State of the Union'...the Pulitzer Committee once more demonstrated its fondness for shows with political backgrounds.

The play was produced at Ford's Theatre in Washington, DC in September 2006.

== Plot ==
In 1946, several friends gather in the house of James Conover in Washington, DC. James is about 60; with him are Spike MacManus, a long-time political reporter and Grant Matthews, in his 40s, a businessman and Katherine (Kay) Thorndike, late 30s.

The Republicans have chosen Grant Matthews to run for President. Grant is estranged from his wife Mary, and he has become romantically involved with Kay Thorndike, a newspaper publisher.

=== Background ===
According to journalist-playwright Sidney Blumenthal "The play's events... allude to Wendell Willkie, the utility company head who became the surprise Republican candidate for president in 1940. 'This is a play about a businessman who is a dark-horse candidate.' " According to Gerald Bordman, "Many critics and playgoers saw more than a touch of the late Wendell Willkie in Matthews".

== Critical response ==
Lewis Nichols, reviewing for the New York Times, wrote: "While every boy inherits the right to grow up to be President of the United States, it takes additional talent to write a good play about it.... With wonderfully funny lines and situations, the new comedy about politics also has enough sentiment to keep it from being farce." In a later column, Nichols wrote: " 'State of the Union' is a comedy with a serious purpose...it briskly wonders why there must be horsetrading rather than honesty, why...the country's people are again losing faith in the ideals.... Certain aspects of the play suggest that the authors admired the late Wendell Willkie in his politically iconoclastic ideas, but the comedy is not a biography."

== Film ==
In 1948 the play was adapted for a film directed by Frank Capra. The film stars Spencer Tracy and Katharine Hepburn.
