= Mary MacArthur (actress) =

American actress (1930–1949)

Mary MacArthur (February 15, 1930 – September 22, 1949) was an American actress. Her death from respiratory polio at age 19 led to creation of the Mary MacArthur Memorial Fund, which provided money for research and for treatment of people with that disease.

== Early years ==
MacArthur was born on February 15, 1930, in New York City. She was the daughter of playwright Charles MacArthur and actress Helen Hayes. Actor James MacArthur was her brother by adoption. Hayes's pregnancy led to a "widely publicized theatrical controversy" and an arbitration settlement after she suddenly left a Pacific Coast production of Coquette, causing the play to close. The producer said that he should not have to pay the Actors' Equity Association's standard "two weeks' salary in lieu of notice" to the play's cast, because the pregnancy was covered by the contract's "act of God" clause. An arbitration committee awarded the pay to the actors.

MacArthur attended Rosemary Hall girls' school in Greenwich, Connecticut, and was a 1949 graduate of the American Academy of Dramatic Arts. She first appeared on stage in 1937 at age 7, in a walk-on appearance with a curtsy (but no lines) when Hayes was performing in Victoria Regina. The New York Times reported, "There were telegrams and flowers backstage, a gift from her mother and the company, and a lot of sentiment."

When MacArthur was 17, she said that she had become interested in acting only within the previous two years. She explained, "My father told me it was time I got a career for myself. He said I couldn't write so I'd better try acting. And now I'm just trying to find out whether I'm any good or not."

== Career ==
In 1946, MacArthur began a theatrical apprenticeship in acting and stagecraft at the Bucks County Playhouse in New Hope, Pennsylvania. Her professional stage debut occurred there on July 15, 1946, when she performed with Hayes in Alice Sit-by-the-Fire.

A review in The Philadelphia Inquirer called the first-night performance "memorable" and added, "It was probably as trying and triumphant a night as any mother and daughter ever experienced." The trying aspect for MacArthur arose from "her mother's enviable reputation as the 'First Lady of the Theater'", while Hayes wanted "to see her own child captivate and hold an audience". The review noted that MacArthur "proved to be her mother's daughter, playing the part of Amy Grey with the teen-age perfection it calls for." A review distributed by the International News Service had a different perspective. It said that MacArthur "stumbled over her lines" and summarized, "though she tried very hard, it was the general feeling among the 400 socialite-spectators that Mary MacArthur is not a born actress."

In 1947, MacArthur, as a member of the supporting cast, toured with Lillian Gish in The Marquise. MacArthur and Hayes appeared again in Alice Sit-by-the-Fire to open the summer 1948 season at the Olney summer theater. When that 10-day run ended, Hayes left to perform in England, while MacArthur remained as resident ingenue. MacArthur and Hayes acted together in The Glass Menagerie in Nyack, New York, in the summer of 1949.

Joint appearances sometimes caused problems for Hayes. When both were appearing on an episode of the radio program Theatre Guild on the Air, director Homer Fickett realized that Hayes "was nervous for Mary, which made Mary nervous, and they were both making me nervous." He said to Hayes, "Helen, you know what you are doing — you are playing Mrs. MacArthur." The tension then lifted. The two also appeared together on the radio program Cavalcade of America.

== Death ==
MacArthur became ill in the summer of 1949 in Westport, Connecticut, while she was performing with Hayes in a pre-Broadway version of the comedy play Good Housekeeping. The play was to have been the vehicle for MacArthur's New York City stage debut. She was admitted to Lenox Hill Hospital on September 14, 1949, and died there on September 22, 1949, aged 19. The cause of death was then said to be "a generalized virus infection". Later reports said that she died of respiratory polio.

== Legacy ==
=== Mary MacArthur Memorial Fund ===
Fundraising efforts led by MacArthur's friends led to creation of the Mary MacArthur Memorial Fund of the National Foundation for Infantile Paralysis. Basil O'Connor, the foundation's president, announced plans for the fund on January 9, 1950, saying that half of the proceeds would be used for care of patients in the community where the money was raised, and the other half would finance respirator centers in at least five cities. The friends' initial efforts were to be supplemented by activities of committees in several cities, with contributions to be solicited from people in the entertainment community.

=== Other activities ===
In January 1950, students from the Professional Children's School put on a memorial performance to honor MacArthur. The two-hour variety show, which Life magazine called the "biggest event of the theatrical year, junior division", raised $9,000 for the March of Dimes.
