= Happy Hunting (musical) =

1956 American musical

- Original cast recording
- Music: Harold Karr
- Lyrics: Matt Dubey
- Book: Howard Lindsay; Russel Crouse
- Productions: 1956 Broadway

Happy Hunting is a 1956 musical with a book by Howard Lindsay and Russel Crouse, lyrics by Matt Dubey, music by Harold Karr, original choreography by Alex Romero, assistant choreographer Eugene Louis Faccuito (Luigi) . The plot focuses on wealthy Philadelphia Main Line widow Liz Livingstone and her efforts to find a royal husband for her daughter Beth.

== Plot ==
Liz Livingstone and her daughter Beth arrive in Monaco to attend the wedding of Prince Rainier and fellow Philadelphian Grace Kelly, only to be denied admission when her name cannot be found on the guest list. To save face, Liz pretends her hotel suite was robbed and she had nothing suitable to wear to the ceremony.

Angered by the snub and determined to find her daughter an even better husband than Grace, Liz arranges a date for Beth and the Duke of Grenada, unaware that the hotel's financial problems, which are being investigated by her attorney Sandy Stewart, are due in no small part to the Duke's failure to pay his bills. When she is made aware of the situation, Liz offers to settle his account and move him, his assistant Arturo, and his prized horses to Philadelphia if he will marry Beth, and he agrees to accept her offer.

Back in the States, complications arise when Liz finds herself falling in love with the Duke while Beth finds she is attracted to Sandy. Everything is resolved when Beth and Sandy elope and the Duke agrees to marry Liz, who realizes he loves her for her money but is willing to accept him on those terms.

== Background ==
After marrying her third husband, Continental Airlines executive Robert Six, in 1953, Ethel Merman retired from performing and happily embraced the life of a Colorado housewife. Six, however, had expected her public appearances to engender publicity for the airline, and her decision to forego the limelight did not sit well with him. He urged her to accept the lead in Happy Hunting, with a book by Howard Lindsay and Russel Crouse (who had written Call Me Madam) and a score by the unknown team of Harold Karr and Matt Dubey. Merman thought the songs were weak but grudgingly acquiesced to her husband's demands.

Initially Merman was pleased with co-star Fernando Lamas, but soon after rehearsals began they clashed when he publicly criticized her performance, and as tensions between them escalated they stopped speaking to each other. Lamas was certain he would be overshadowed by Merman and plotted to draw the focus away from her. Known throughout Hollywood for his unusually large physical endowment, he instructed costume designer Irene Sharaff to cut his pants so they would cling as tightly as possible. On opening night in Philadelphia during the pre-Broadway tryout, his appearance elicited loud gasps from the audience when he stepped out on stage for the first time. Merman was not amused by the vulgar display and demanded his costume be altered.

Throughout the tryout period, Merman expressed her dissatisfaction with both the book and the score, both of which underwent revisions on a regular basis. After the show opened on Broadway, she insisted two of her least favorite numbers be replaced by songs written by her friend Roger Edens who, due to his exclusive contract with Metro-Goldwyn-Mayer, credited them to Kay Thompson.

== Production ==
Directed by Abe Burrows, with musical staging by Alex Romero and Bob Herget, the Broadway production opened with an advance sale of $1.5 million on December 6, 1956, at the Majestic Theatre, where it ran for 412 performances. It closed on November 30, 1957, with Merman happy to see what she considered "a dreary obligation" finally come to an end. In addition to Merman and Lamas, the cast included Virginia Gibson as Beth Livingstone, Gordon Polk as Sandy Stewart, Leon Belasco as Arturo, and Estelle Parsons in her Broadway debut. Jo Mielziner was responsible for the scenic and lighting design.

== Critical reception ==
Although Brooks Atkinson of the New York Times thought the score was "hardly more than adequate," he called Merman "as brassy as ever, glowing like a neon light whenever she steps on the stage." The critic for Time thought Merman "consistently converts vulgarity into fun" but called her triumph "a minor one, what with a book that has at best a routine brightness, and a score that sometimes lacks lilt even where it seems reminiscent."

== Nominations ==
Ethel Merman was nominated for the Tony Award for Best Performance by a Leading Actress in a Musical but lost to Judy Holliday in Bells Are Ringing. Fernando Lamas was nominated for the Tony Award for Best Performance by a Leading Actor in a Musical but lost to Rex Harrison in My Fair Lady. Virginia Gibson was nominated for the Tony Award for Best Performance by a Featured Actress in a Musical but lost to Edith Adams in Li'l Abner. Irene Sharaff was nominated for the Tony Award for Best Costume Design but lost to Cecil Beaton for My Fair Lady.

== Song list ==
Act I

- "Postage Stamp-Principality" - Tourists and Monegasques
- "Don't Tell Me" - Sandy and Beth Livingstone
- "It's Good to Be Here" - Liz Livingstone and Reporters
- "Mutual Admiration Society" - Liz and Beth Livingstone
- "For Love or Money" - The Girls
- "Bikini Dance" - Beth Livingstone
- "It's Like a Beautiful Woman" - Duke of Granada
- "Wedding-of-the-Year Blues" - Maud Foley, Harry Watson, Jack Adams, Reporters, and Photographers
- "Mr. Livingstone" - Liz Livingstone
- "If'n" - Beth Livingstone, Sandy, and Passengers
- "This Is What I Call Love" - Liz Livingstone

Act II

- "A New-Fangled Tango" - Liz and Beth Livingstone, Arturo, and Guests
- "She's Just Another Girl" - Sandy
- "The Game of Love" - Liz Livingstone
- "Happy Hunting" - Liz Livingstone, Duke of Granada, and Members of the Hunt
- "I'm a Funny Dame" - Liz Livingstone
- "This Much I Know" - Duke of Granada
- "Just Another Guy" - Liz Livingstone
- "Everyone Who's "Who's Who" - Jack Adams, Harry Watson, and Footmen
- "Mutual Admiration Society (Reprise)" - Liz Livingstone and Duke of Granada
