= Life with Father =

1939 play by Howard Lindsay and Russel Crouse

- Written by: Howard Lindsay; Russel Crouse; Based on the novel by Clarence Day
- Genre: Comedy
- Setting: The morning room of the Day house on Madison Avenue in the late 1880s

Premiere
- Date: November 8, 1939
- Place: Empire Theatre; New York City

Life with Father is a 1939 play by Howard Lindsay and Russel Crouse, adapted from a humorous autobiographical book of stories compiled in 1935 by Clarence Day. The Broadway production ran for 3,224 performances over 401 weeks to become the longest-running non-musical play on Broadway, a record that it still holds. The play was adapted into a 1947 feature film and a television series.

== Book ==
Clarence Day wrote humorously about his family and life. The stories of his father Clarence "Clare" Day were first printed in The New Yorker. They portray a rambunctious, overburdened Wall Street broker who demands that everything from his family should be just so. The more he rails against his staff, his cook, his wife, his horse, salesmen, holidays, his children and the inability of the world to live up to his impossible standards, the more comical and lovable he becomes to his own family who love him despite it all. First published in 1936, shortly after his death, Day's book is a picture of New York upper-middle-class family life in the 1890s. The stories are filled with affectionate irony. Day's understated, matter-of-fact style underlines the comedy in everyday situations.

== Production ==
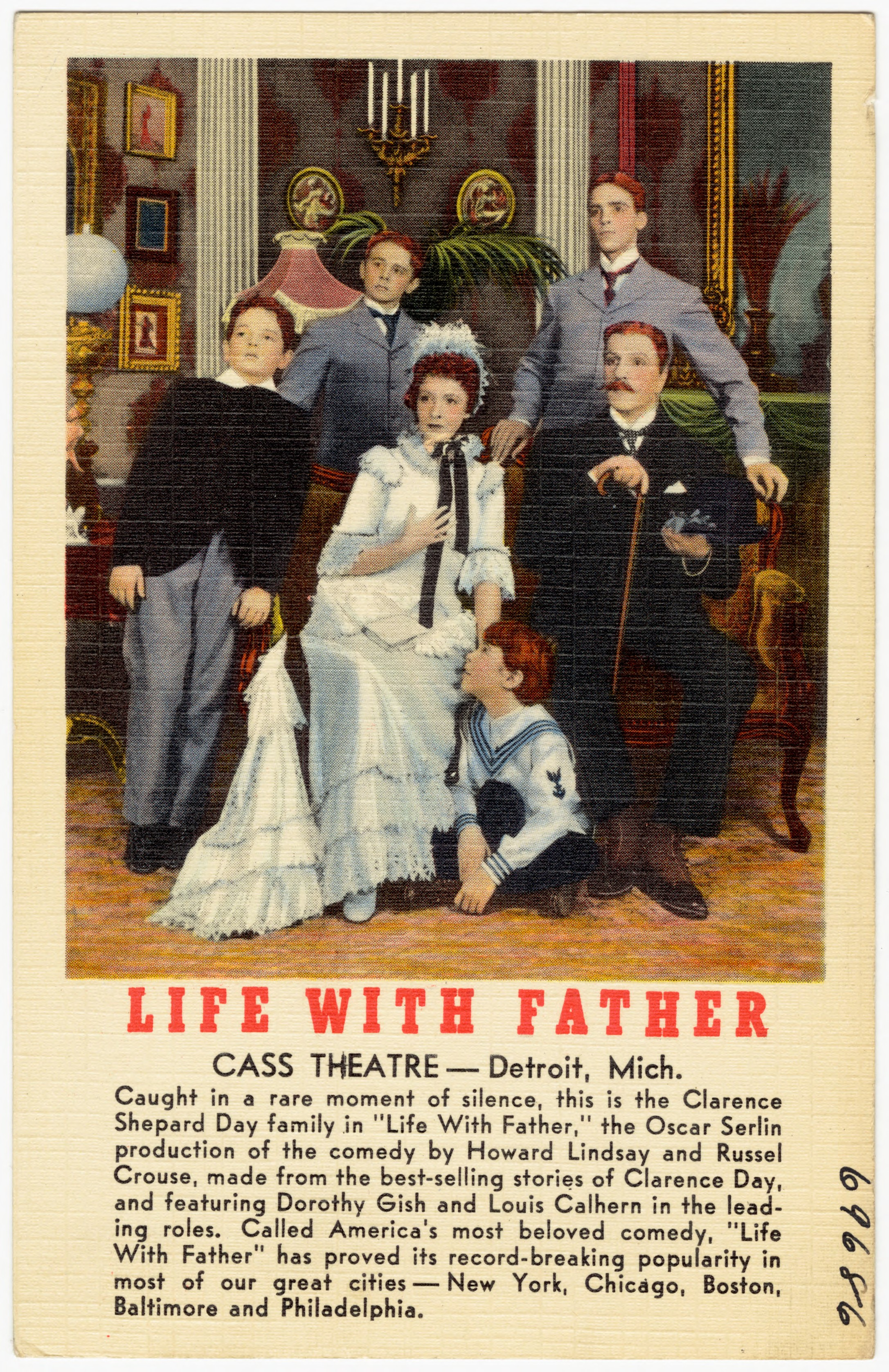
Postcard showing cast featuring Dorothy Gish

The 1939 Broadway production ran for over seven years to become the longest-running non-musical play on Broadway, a record that it still holds. It also held the title of the longest running Broadway play of any type of all time from 1947 to 1972. It opened at the Empire Theatre on November 8, 1939 and ran at that theatre until September 8, 1945. It then moved to the Bijou Theatre where it ran until June 15, 1947, and finished its run at the Alvin Theatre on July 12, 1947 for a combined total of 3,224 performances. The play was produced by Oscar Serlin, staged by Bretaigne Windust, with setting and costumes by Stewart Chaney. It starred Howard Lindsay, his wife Dorothy Stickney, and Teresa Wright.

=== Cast ===
- Katherine Bard as Annie
- Dorothy Stickney as Lavinia "Vinnie" Day
- John Drew Devereaux as Clarence Day, Jr.
- Richard Simon as John Day
- Raymond Roe as Whitney Day
- Larry Robinson as Harlan Day
- Howard Lindsay as Father (Clarence "Clare" Day, Sr.)
- Dorothy Bernard as Margaret
- Ruth Hammond as Cora
- Teresa Wright as Mary Skinner
- Richard Sterling as the Reverend Dr. Lloyd
- Portia Morrow as Delia
- Nellie Burt as Nora
- A.H. Van Buren as Dr. Humphreys
- John C. King as Dr. Somers
- Timothy Kearse as Maggie

== Subsequent productions ==
Concurrent with the Broadway production, the producers sent out 11 touring companies that performed in 214 cities. The amateur rights to Life with Father were released in 1948, and the following year saw 187 productions of the play, including a production at Theatre in the Round Players that included consultation with Warner films on staging.

In 1953, The Ford 50th Anniversary Show, broadcast live on both the CBS and NBC television networks, opened with Oscar Hammerstein II introducing a scene from the play featuring original cast members Howard Lindsay and Dorothy Stickney. The Ford show attracted an audience of 60 million viewers. Forty years after the broadcast, television critic Tom Shales recalled the broadcast as both "a landmark in television" and "a milestone in the cultural life of the '50s".

The only major New York revival occurred in 1967 in a limited run at City Center, starring Leon Ames and Dorothy Stickney. Critic Vincent Canby called the revival "a quaint, pretty picture postcard." Although professional revivals are now rare, Life with Father continues to be produced by amateur companies such as the American Century Theatre in Virginia (2009) and the Victorian Players in Ohio (2014).

== Critical reception ==
The New York Times critic Brooks Atkinson wrote in his review "Sooner or later every one will have to see Life with Father, which opened at the Empire last evening. For the late Clarence Day's vastly amusing sketches of his despotic parent have now been translated into a perfect comedy by Howard Lindsay and Russel Crouse, and must be reckoned an authentic port [sic] of our American folklore." When Life with Father surpassed Tobacco Road as the longest-running Broadway play, Elliot Norton of the Boston Post celebrated the play as "warmly human and heartily comical and completely inoffensive," thus restoring his faith in the theatre-going public. Contemporary scholar Jordan Schildcrout describes Life with Father as "a comedy in which characters challenge and ultimately win over a figure of authority," which allows the play to appeal to nostalgia for more conservative times, while also finding pleasure in gentle subversion and anti-authoritarianism.

== Adaptations ==
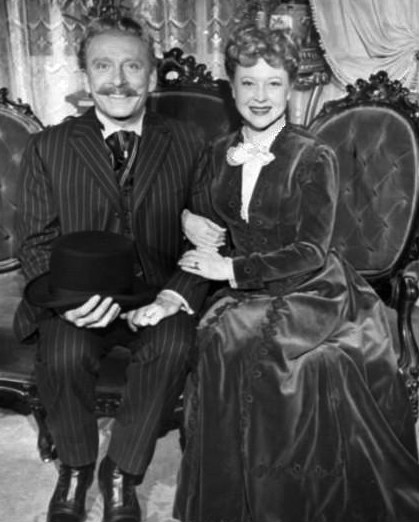
Leon Ames and Lurene Tuttle in the television version, 1954

Life with Father was adapted for the November 6, 1938, broadcast of CBS Radio's The Mercury Theatre on the Air. The cast included Orson Welles (Father), Mildred Natwick (Mother), Mary Wickes (Employment Office Manager), Alice Frost (Margaret) and Arthur Anderson (young Clarence Day).

The theatrical adaptation of Life With Father was made into a film in 1947, directed by Michael Curtiz and starring William Powell and Irene Dunne as Clarence and his wife, supported by Elizabeth Taylor, Edmund Gwenn, ZaSu Pitts, Jimmy Lydon and Martin Milner. Six years later, the film was adapted into a television series, starring Leon Ames and Lurene Tuttle, which ran from November 1953 until July 1955 on the CBS Television network. The series was the first live color program for network TV to originate in Hollywood. The film (not the series) and its audio entered the public domain in 1975.

== See also ==
- Long-running plays

Preceded by Tobacco Road	Longest-running Broadway show 1947–1972	Succeeded by Fiddler on the Roof
