= Dorothy Stickney =

American actress (1896–1998)

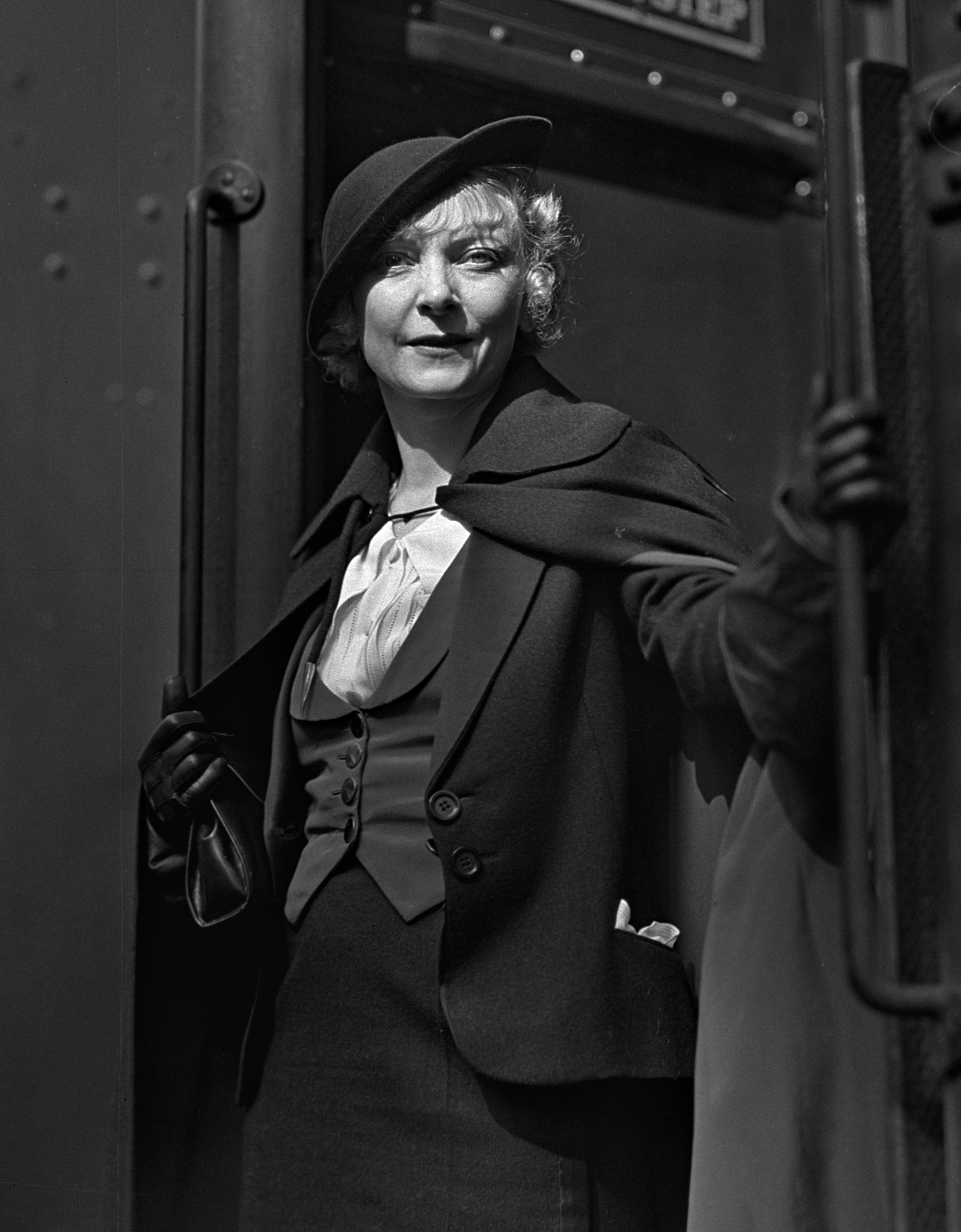
- Stickney in 1934
- Born: Dorothy Hayes Stickney; June 21, 1896; Dickinson, North Dakota, U.S.
- Died: June 2, 1998 (aged 101); New York City, U.S.
- Occupations: Stage, film, television actress
- Years active: 1926–1977
- Spouse: Howard Lindsay (m. 1927; died 1968)

Dorothy Stickney (June 21, 1896 – June 2, 1998) was an American film, stage, and television actress, best known for appearing in the long-running Broadway hit Life with Father.

== Early years ==
Stickney was born in Dickinson, North Dakota; her father, Victor Hugo Stickney, was a physician. Because she had corneal ulcers, she was unable to go into bright places and spent most of her childhood indoors to protect her sensitive eyes. Her introduction to reading came from family members who read the classics to her. Because she had difficulty reading, she focused on skills like dancing and elocution. She was fond of going to the theater with her family, and this sparked her interest in being an actress. After seven operations, at age 20 her vision returned to normal. and Stickney was able to continue her education and pursue a career in the theater.

Stickney attended the North Western Dramatic School in Minneapolis, Minnesota in addition to La Salle Seminary in Auburndale, Massachusetts; Oak Hall in Saint Paul, Minnesota; and Saint Catherine's College in Minneapolis.

== Career ==
Making her professional stage debut in May 1921 in Minot, North Dakota, Stickney sang and danced as one of the four Southern Belles in vaudeville and began acting in summer stock companies including Atlanta's Forsyth Players in the early 1920s before she married Howard Lindsay. Stickney and Lindsay were married on August 13, 1927, in Madison, Maine, and the two stayed married until Lindsay's death in 1968.

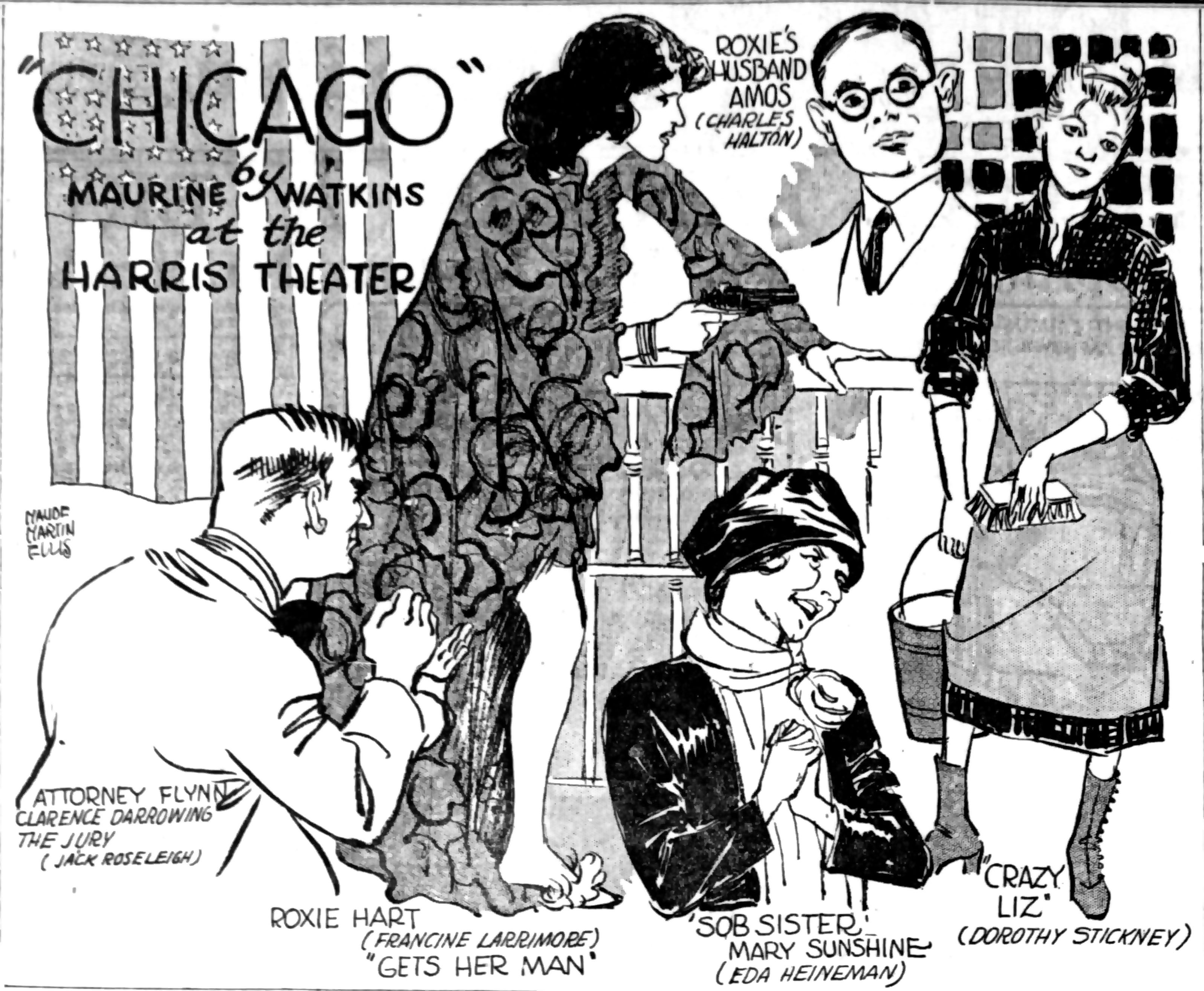
Stickney and fellow cast members in Chicago Tribune image depicting the 1927 Chicago production of the play Chicago.

Stickney made her Broadway debut in 1926 in The Squall and had a string of hits, frequently playing eccentric characters. She was Liz, the mad scrubwoman, in the original nonmusical version of Chicago, and Mollie Molloy, who dives out of the pressroom window, in The Front Page. With increasingly important roles, she moved on to Philip Goes Forth, Another Language, On Borrowed Time, The Small Hours, To Be Continued and The Honeys. In 1940, Stickney received the Barter Theatre Award for "outstanding performance for an American player" for her role as Vinnie in Life with Father, which had been written by her husband, Lindsay, who also co-starred. The award was presented to her by Eleanor Roosevelt.

She also appeared in some films and TV programs, and wrote several poems including "You're Not the Type" and "My Dressing Room". Her early TV appearances included "On Borrowed Time", a episode of Ford Theatre on CBS in 1949. She played the Queen in the original 1957 TV production of Rodgers & Hammerstein's Cinderella, and later Aunt Abby in the 1962 Hallmark TV production of Arsenic and Old Lace, co-starring Boris Karloff.

On September 22, 1958, Stickney debuted A Lovely Light at the Barter Theatre in Abingdon, Virginia. The one-woman show used content from poems and letters of Edna St. Vincent Millay with the dramatization by Stickney and Lindsay as the director. She went on to present the program in London and across the United States. She continued to present the program until at least as late as July 1977, when she did so at the White Barn Theatre in Norwalk, Connecticut. She performed a condensed version of the show on WNEW-TV's Festival of Performing Arts on April 17, 1962. A review of that broadcast in The New York Times said, "Out of a literary personality, Miss Stickney has created a living one." Barbara Delatiner, in a review in Newsday, wrote that Stickney's portrayal of Millay "was simply superb". She added, "She is not Dorothy Stickney, actress, but Edna St. Vincent Millay, poet, in all her many moods ..." When she did A Lovely Light at the Mayfair Theater in January 1964, a different critic wrote in The New York Times that Stickney's talents had not diminished: "... she is in top form re-creating the moods, the heartaches and the triumphs of one of this century's most lyrical poets".

In 1961, she was the second inductee of the North Dakota Roughrider Award. On November 16, 1966, Stickney appeared on ABC's Stage 67 anthology program in Stephen Sondheim's macabre television musical "Evening Primrose" as Mrs. Monday, the leader of the mannequins who come to life every evening in a department store. One of her later stage roles was as Berthe in the original Broadway run of Pippin from 1972 to 1977. She took over the role in 1973 from Irene Ryan, who died during the run. The show was her first musical. She created the role of Emily Baldwin, one of the Baldwin sisters, in the television film The Homecoming : A Christmas Story, which was the pilot for The Waltons.

In 1979, Doubleday published Stickney's book, Openings and Closings, a memoir that chronicled her long career as well as her secret battle with stage fright.

Starting in 1935, Stickney and Howard maintained a weekend and vacation home – a farmstead built in 1745 – in the Stanton section of Readington Township, New Jersey; the township purchased it from then-centenarian Stickney, for preservation, in 1997.

== Recognition ==
Bowdoin College presented honorary degrees to Stickney and Lindsay in 1951.

In 1968 Stickney received the Mary MacArthur Memorial Award from the March of Dimes with the award also going posthumously to Lindsay. The annual award recognized significant activities on behalf of civic and humanitarian causes in addition to distinguished contributions to the American theater.

On October 20, 1976, Dickinson State University named an auditorium on its campus Dorothy Stickney Auditorium. A plaque that hangs with her portrait in the auditorium describes her as "... a loyal friend and benefactress of Dickinson State University".

== Death ==
She died on June 2, 1998, in New York City, just 19 days before her 102nd birthday. She had 2 children and no immediate family survivors.

== Papers ==
Stickney's and Lindsay's papers are housed at the New York Public Library. The collection contains articles, photographs, programs, scripts, and writings related to the couple.

== Filmography ==
Year	Title	Role	Notes
1931	My Sin	Mrs. Jenkins, the Landlady	Uncredited
1931	Working Girls	Loretta	
1932	Wayward	Hattie	
1934	Murder at the Vanities	Norma Watson	
1934	The Little Minister	Jean	
1936	The Moon's Our Home	Hilda	
1936	And So They Were Married	Miss Peabody	
1938	I Met My Love Again	Mrs. Emily Towner	
1939	What a Life	Miss Wheeler	
1944	The Uninvited	Miss Bird	
1948	Miss Tatlock's Millions	Emily Tatlock	
1954	The Great Diamond Robbery	Emily Drumman	
1956	The Catered Affair	Mrs. Rafferty	
1956	Studio One		"A Special Announcement"
1956	Alfred Hitchcock Presents	Cissie Enright	Season 2 Episode 8: "Conversation Over a Corpse"
1957	Alfred Hitchcock Presents	Emma Paisley	Season 3 Episode 12: "Mrs. Paisley's Cat"
1959	The Remarkable Mr. Pennypacker	Aunt Jane Pennypacker	
1962	Arsenic & Old Lace	Abby Brewster	TV movie
1970	I Never Sang for My Father	Margaret Garrison	
1971	The Homecoming: A Christmas Story	Emily Baldwin	TV movie; pilot for The Waltons
