= Russel Crouse =

American librettist and producer (1893–1966)

- Born: 20 February 1893; Findlay, Ohio, U.S.
- Died: 3 April 1966 (aged 73); New York City, U.S.
- Spouse(s): Alison Smith (d. 1943); Anna Erskine (m. 1945)
- Children: Timothy Crouse; Lindsay Crouse
- Relatives: Zosia Mamet (granddaughter); John Erskine (father-in-law)

Russel Crouse (20 February 1893 – 3 April 1966) was an American playwright and librettist, best known for his work in the Broadway writing partnership of Lindsay and Crouse.

== Life and career ==
Born in Findlay, Ohio, Crouse was the son of Sarah (née Schumacher) and Hiram Powers Crouse, a newspaperman. He began his Broadway career in 1928 as an actor in the play Gentlemen of the Press, in which he played Bellflower. By 1931, however, he had turned his attention to writing, penning the book for the musical The Gang's All Here, collaborating with Frank McCoy, Morrie Ryskind and Oscar Hammerstein II.

His first work with his long-time partner Howard Lindsay came in 1934, when the two men revised the P. G. Wodehouse/Guy Bolton book for the Cole Porter musical Anything Goes. They then went on to adapt Clarence Day's Life with Father, which became one of the longest running Broadway plays.

Lindsay and Crouse later became Broadway producers, often acting in that capacity for their own work. They also owned and operated the Hudson Theatre on 44th Street in New York City.

Perhaps their best-known collaboration was on the book for the 1960 Tony Award-winning musical The Sound of Music, which featured music by Richard Rodgers and lyrics by Crouse's old collaborator Oscar Hammerstein II. Their 1946 play State of the Union won that year's Pulitzer Prize for Drama. They also collaborated on Call Me Madam, Happy Hunting, Mr. President, and The Great Sebastians (1955). Crouse joined The Lambs social club in 1941 and remained a member until his death.

Crouse is the father of writer Timothy Crouse, and named his actress daughter Lindsay Ann Crouse in an intentional tribute to his collaboration with Howard Lindsay.
