= Howard Lindsay =

American dramatist (1889–1968)

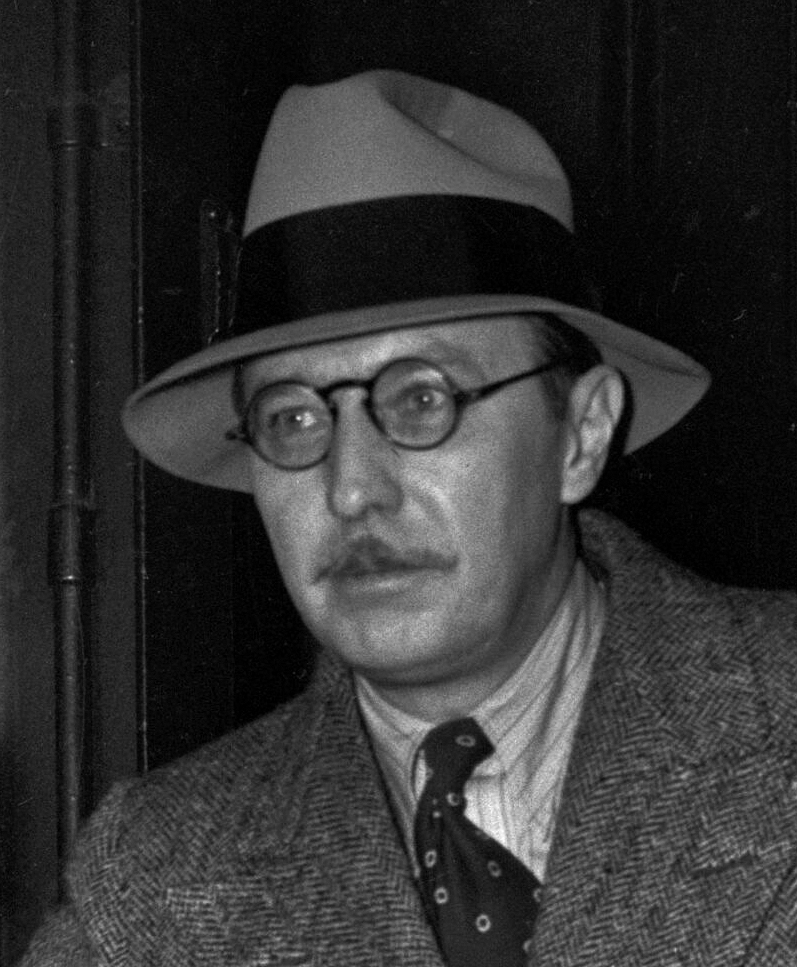
- Lindsay in 1935
- Born: Herman Nelke; March 29, 1889; Waterford, New York
- Died: February 11, 1968 (aged 78); New York City, New York
- Spouse: Dorothy Stickney (m. 1927)

Howard Lindsay, born Herman Nelke, (March 29, 1889 – February 11, 1968) was an American playwright, librettist, director, actor and theatrical producer. He is best known for his writing work as part of the collaboration of Lindsay and Crouse, and for his performance, with his wife Dorothy Stickney, in the long-running play Life with Father.

== Biography ==
Lindsay graduated from Boston Latin School in 1907. He was an actor and director before turning to writing plays. He played the role of "Father" in Life with Father on Broadway in 1939.

Together with Russel Crouse, Lindsay won the Pulitzer Prize for Drama for the 1945 play State of the Union, which was adapted into a film directed by Frank Capra three years later.

On October 5, 1947, Lindsay became the master of ceremonies of the Ford Theatre radio program.

The 1957 Rodgers and Hammerstein television musical Cinderella, recently revived by PBS, featured Lindsay and Stickney playing the roles of the King and Queen, one of the few times a Lindsay performance has been captured on film.

In 1960, he and Crouse won the Tony Award for Best Musical for The Sound of Music, for which they wrote the book. They also collaborated on Call Me Madam, Happy Hunting and Mr. President.

Lindsay was a member of The Players, the theatrical club founded in the 1800s by Edwin Booth, and served as its president from 1955 to 1965. Lindsay joined The Lambs in 1925 and remained a member until he died. His writing partner, Russel Crouse, was also a member of The Lambs.

Starting in 1935, Stickney and Howard maintained a weekend and vacation home – a farmstead built in 1745 – in the Stanton section of Readington Township, New Jersey; the township purchased it from then-centenarian Stickney, for preservation, in 1997.
