= J. Roderick MacArthur =

American businessman (1920–1984)

John Roderick MacArthur
- Born: December 21, 1920; San Francisco, California, U.S.
- Died: December 15, 1984 (aged 63); Chicago, Illinois, U.S.
- Burial place: Graceland Cemetery
- Education: Rollins College
- Occupations: Businessman and philanthropist
- Known for: Bradford Exchange
- Spouse: Christiane L'Entendart (m. 1947)
- Children: 3, including John R. MacArthur
- Parent(s): John D. MacArthur; Louise Ingalls
- Relatives: Charles MacArthur (uncle); Helen Hayes (aunt); James MacArthur (cousin)

John Roderick MacArthur (December 21, 1920 – December 15, 1984) was a U.S. businessman and philanthropist in Chicago. The J. Roderick MacArthur Foundation, a philanthropic organization supporting civil rights in the United States, was established in his name.

The foundation established the MacArthur Justice Center, a public interest law firm that formed an alliance in 2006 at the Northwestern University School of Law, and litigates for civil rights. In addition, MacArthur Justice centers have been opened in Louisiana (2013), Mississippi, in an association with the law school at University of Mississippi (2014); Missouri (2016); and Washington, D.C. (2017).

He is the son of John D. MacArthur, who established the John D. and Catherine T. MacArthur Foundation in his will. It has funded the MacArthur fellowships, grants to authors, artists and scientists.

== Biography ==
J. Roderick MacArthur, known as Rod MacArthur, was born December 21, 1920, to the former Louise Ingalls and John D. MacArthur. The couple also had a daughter, Virginia MacArthur. In 1937 John D. MacArthur traveled to Mexico to obtain a divorce. One year later he married Catherine T. Hyland.

Rod MacArthur attended Rollins College in Florida and worked as a stringer for the Associated Press in Mexico. During World War II, he joined the American Field Service, serving with the French Army in the ambulance corps, and he participated in the campaign that liberated France.

He worked for his father in the insurance industry before they became estranged. In 1973, while working with a company that sold ceramic collectible plates, MacArthur noticed that the ceramic-collectible market was chaotic. He started the Bradford Exchange, and by the time of his death, it sold about 90 percent of all the collectible plates in the world. Often credited with becoming "a self-made millionaire," MacArthur did have some financial backing from his father, but the concept, business plan and effort behind the Bradford Exchange were Rod MacArthur's own.

In 1975, once the business had become successful, MacArthur's father claimed that the Bradford Exchange was his business, seizing its customer lists and putting the on-hand inventory under lock and key. Rod MacArthur then organized a group of employees to enter his father's warehouse in Northbrook, Illinois, and hustle the inventory into a waiting fleet of trucks. He reestablished the business away from his father.

== Personal life ==
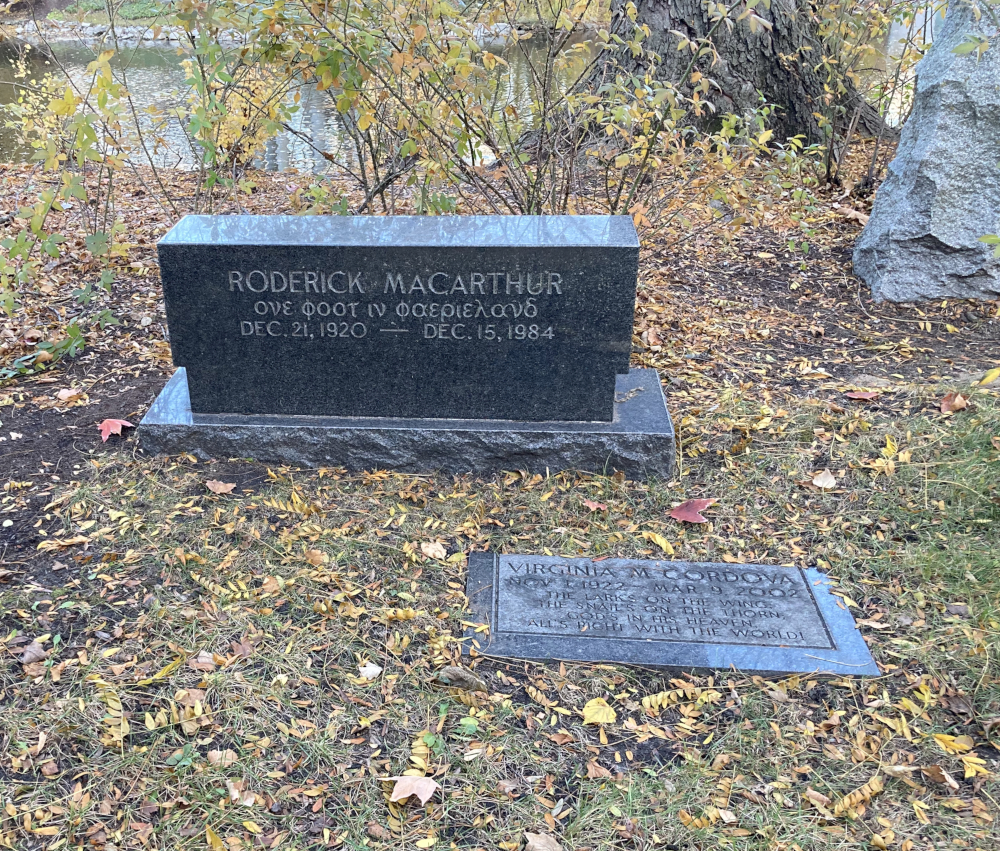
MacArthur's grave at Graceland Cemetery

Rod MacArthur married Christiane L'Entendart in Paris in 1947. They had a daughter, Solange, and two sons. John Roderick "Rick" MacArthur later became the publisher and president of Harper's Magazine.

== Death ==
Rod MacArthur died December 15, 1984, from pancreatic cancer six days before his 64th birthday. He is buried in Graceland Cemetery in Chicago. His epitaph, written in English using Greek letters, is ονε φοοτ ιν φαιριελανδ ("one foot in fairieland").

== Philanthropic endeavors ==
MacArthur reconciled with his father before John D. MacArthur died on January 6, 1978 (of pancreatic cancer). He named MacArthur to the board of his foundation, which was founded according to his will. At that point, John D. MacArthur was worth in excess of $1 billion and was reportedly one of the three richest men in the United States.

John D. MacArthur bequeathed ninety-two percent of his estate to begin the John D. and Catherine T. MacArthur Foundation. The Foundation's first Board of Directors, per John D. MacArthur's will, included J. Roderick MacArthur, Catherine T. MacArthur (his second wife), his attorney William T. Kirby, two officers of Bankers Life and Casualty, and radio commentator Paul Harvey.

Rod MacArthur's son, John Roderick "Rick" MacArthur, has charged publicly: "The idea behind the foundation was as a tax dodge that he thought would allow his business executives to run his company forever. He clearly didn't understand the tax laws."

In any event, Rod MacArthur quickly clashed with the board of his father's foundation. The Bankers Life executives and Paul Harvey held conservative views regarding the structure and size of the board, its purpose, and issues related to the sale of the business.

Largely due to Rod MacArthur's efforts, the board was expanded to thirteen members in 1979. The new members had backgrounds from academia, science, government, and business. This board now argued over the grants that were made to favorite board member causes, often trading votes among themselves. Even though there was support for each board member's causes, an extremely bitter and public argument erupted between Rod MacArthur and former U.S. Treasury Secretary William E. Simon over board grants to a number of conservative causes. Eventually Simon resigned from the board.

Rod MacArthur filed two lawsuits in an effort to redirect the board and foundation. In February 1984 he sued fellow board members, charging that they were acting as executives of Bankers Life and were looking out for their own best interest and not the needs of the foundation. He alleged that the foundation was not managing its assets properly. MacArthur said that high fees were being paid to board members for their foundation work, and he believed that Bankers Life was not being managed well and had lost value. He requested that either the foundation be dissolved or that the court appoint a receiver to manage and sell Bankers Life.

After MacArthur blocked the sale of Bankers Life at $268 million, the board found a buyer that was willing to pay $384 million for the company. This sale removed the Bankers Life issue from the suit. MacArthur's allegations that board members and key foundation executives were profiting at the expense of the foundation were still open.

While still on the board of the John D. and Catherine T. MacArthur Foundation, MacArthur pushed the Board to offer the MacArthur fellowships, also called "Genius Grants".

Second, in 1980 at the urging of his son John R. "Rick" MacArthur, then 23, the senior MacArthur persuaded the Board to partner in creating and funding a Harper's Magazine Foundation, in order to acquire and operate Harper's Magazine, which had been struggling financially. This new entity acquired Harper's Magazine (which was then losing nearly $2 million per year and was on the verge of ceasing publication) for $250,000. Rick (now called Roderick) MacArthur eventually took over the foundation that owned Harper's.

In 1976 Rod MacArthur had used his substantial fortune from the Bradford Exchange to form his own foundation, the J. Roderick MacArthur Foundation. As of 2004, the J. Roderick MacArthur Foundation had $22 million in assets. It has supported causes of civil rights and civil liberties, including the Death Penalty Information Center in Washington, D.C., and the Roderick & Solange MacArthur Justice Center, a public interest law firm in Chicago that is named and managed by two of his children.

In 2006 the MacArthur Justice Center formed an association with the Northwestern University School of Law and has a clinic there. It has opened additional centers since then: in New Orleans (2013), in Oxford, Mississippi, in an association with the law school at University of Mississippi (2014); and in Saint Louis, Missouri (2016).
