= Catherine T. MacArthur =

American businesswoman

Catherine MacArthur
- Born: Catherine Terese Hyland; November 23, 1908; Chicago, Illinois, U.S.
- Died: December 15, 1981 (aged 73); Singer Island, Palm Beach Shores, Florida, U.S.
- Occupation: Philanthropist
- Known for: MacArthur Foundation
- Spouse: John D. MacArthur (m. 1938; died 1978)

Catherine Terese MacArthur (née Hyland; November 23, 1908 – December 15, 1981) was an American philanthropist. With the estate of her husband, businessman and philanthropist John D. MacArthur, she co-founded the MacArthur Foundation, one of the 10 largest philanthropic foundations in the United States.

== Life ==
Born Catherine Terese Hyland in 1908, MacArthur was one of nine children of Irish immigrants on Chicago's South Side. Her father owned and operated several retail stores, was active in Democratic politics in Chicago, and held several state and local governmental positions.

In 1938, she married John D. MacArthur. In 1935, MacArthur purchased Bankers Life and Casualty for $2,500 and used mass marketing techniques to sell insurance by mail.

Banker's Life was the basis of John's phenomenal success in real estate and insurance. Official Banker's Life press releases verify that Catherine was intimately involved in the business's success. She appears throughout the records under her maiden name, C.T. Hyland, as corporate secretary, director, or both.

In 1963, John purchased the Colonnades Hotel in Palm Beach Shores on Singer Island, Florida. Catherine lived with her husband in a modest apartment overlooking the parking lot, while John conducted his business from a corner table in the hotel's coffee shop.

When John D. MacArthur died on January 6, 1978, he was worth over $1 billion and reportedly one of the three wealthiest men in the United States.

== Death ==
Catherine MacArthur died on December 15, 1981, in her long-time residence at the Colonnades Beach Hotel in Palm Beach Shores, Florida after a long struggle with cancer.
