= Munyon =

Munyon may refer to:

- James M. Munyon (1848–1918), American promoter of homeopathy
  - Munyon Island, Florida, named after James M. Munyon

== See also ==
- James LeMunyon (born 1959), American politician and entrepreneur
