= John R. MacArthur =

American journalist and author

- Born: John Rick MacArthur; June 4, 1956 (age 69); New York City, New York, U.S.
- Education: Columbia University (BA)
- Occupations: Journalist and author
- Children: 2
- Parent(s): J. Roderick MacArthur; Christiane L'Étendart
- Relatives: John D. MacArthur (grandfather), James MacArthur (paternal first cousin once removed)

John Rick MacArthur (born June 4, 1956) is an American journalist, historian, and author of books about US politics. He is the president and publisher of Harper's Magazine.

== Biography ==
MacArthur is the son of J. Roderick MacArthur and French-born Christiane L’Étendart. and the grandson of billionaire John D. MacArthur. He grew up in Winnetka, Illinois, graduating from North Shore Country Day School in 1974. He graduated from Columbia University with a B.A. in history in 1978. In 2017 he was named a chevalier in the French order of arts and letters. He lives with his wife and two daughters in New York City. He is well known for his skeptical stance of the internet, all things technological and insistence on print publishing.

== Career ==
MacArthur writes a monthly column, in French, for Le Devoir on a wide range of topics from politics to culture and is a regular contributor to the Spectator (U.K.), the Toronto Star, Le Monde Diplomatique and Le Monde.

J. Roderick MacArthur, his father, served on the board of the John D. and Catherine T. MacArthur Foundation until his death in 1984. In 1980, John R. MacArthur persuaded the foundation to partner in creating and funding a Harper's Magazine Foundation to acquire and operate the magazine of the same name. This new entity acquired Harper's Magazine (which was then losing nearly $2 million per year and was on the verge of ceasing publication) for $250,000. He became president and publisher of Harper's Magazine in 1983.

In 1993, he received the Baltimore Sun's H.L. Mencken Writing Award for best editorial/op-ed column for his New York Times exposé of "Nayirah", the Kuwaiti diplomat's daughter who helped fake the Iraqi baby-incubator atrocity.

MacArthur has been a reporter for The Wall Street Journal (1977), the Washington Star (1978), The Bergen Record (1978–1979), Chicago Sun-Times (1979–1982), and an assistant foreign editor at United Press International (1982).

MacArthur serves on the board of the Death Penalty Information Center. He received the Philolexian Award for Distinguished Literary Achievement in 2009.

== Bibliography ==
- Graham Greene: The Last Interview and Other Conversations. Nonfiction. Published by Melville House. Editor and author of introduction. September 2019.
- Second front : censorship and propaganda in the 1991 Gulf War. Hill and Wang. 1992.
- The Selling of "Free Trade": Nafta, Washington, and the Subversion of American Democracy (Hill and Wang, 2000).
- Second front : censorship and propaganda in the 1991 Gulf War (Second ed.). University of California Press. 2004 [1992].
- You Can't Be President: The Outrageous Barriers to Democracy in America (Melville House Publishing, 2008). Reissued as The Outrageous Barriers to Democracy in America (Melville House Publishing, 2012). Published in France as Une Caste américaine (Éditions des Arènes, 2008).
- L'Illusion Obama. Published in France (Éditions des Arènes, 2012) and in Canada (Lux Éditeur, 2012).
- "The human factor : how I learned the real meaning of dissent". Memoir. Harper's Magazine. 336 (2012): 63–68. January 2018.
