= Munyon Island =

Island in North Palm Beach, Florida, U.S.

Coordinates: 26°49′00″N 80°02′50″W

Munyon Island is located in the Lake Worth Lagoon Estuary in North Palm Beach, Florida. It is part of John D. MacArthur Beach State Park.

== History ==
Munyon Island was originally called Nuctsachoo by the Seminoles, which means Pelican Island. It reportedly supported one of the largest wading bird rookeries in South Florida.

The first documented inhabitant of Munyon Island in 1884, was a man named Rodgers who was known to be an eccentric "Robinson Crusoe" type who lived in a tent and made his living by selling green sea turtles which he caught in Lake Worth.

The next inhabitants were the Pitts family, who bought the island in 1892 and built a two-story house.

In 1901, the Pitts sold the island to Dr. James M. Munyon. In 1903, Munyon completed construction of the Hotel Hygeia. Named after the Greek goddess of Health, the five story, twenty-one room, eight bath hotel catered to ailing, wealthy Northerners who came to Palm Beach to recuperate on the tropical Island and drink of "Dr. Munyon's Paw-Paw Elixir", consisting primarily of fermented papaya juice, which he bottled on the island. The hotel burned to the ground in 1917 and from that time the island has remained largely uninhabited.

The island was acquired by John D. MacArthur in 1955 and by the State of Florida in 1981.

== Kayaking ==
The shallow estuary around Munyon Island is frequented by kayakers. Kayaks can be rented in John D. MacArthur Beach State Park and the park also has a kayak launch. The launch is no longer accessible from the west side due to lack of maintenance of wooden bridge and storm damage. Kayakers must be attentive to the tide, during low tide the estuary becomes an impassable mud flat.

The island has no bathrooms, but it does have picnic tables and grills.

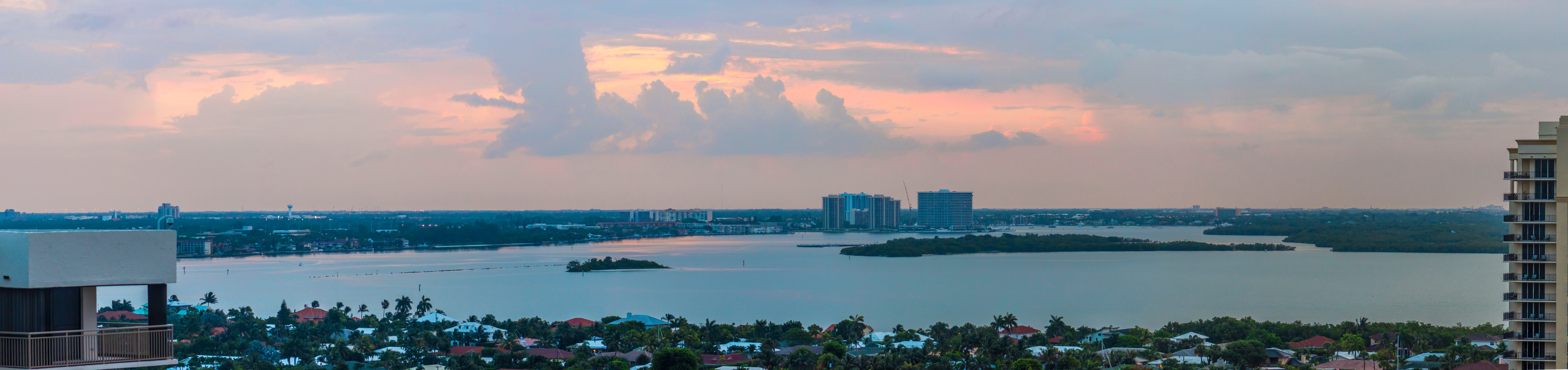

== Wildlife ==
Wildlife on and around Munyon Island includes blue sea grass, great blue heron, and little blue heron. The waters contain mojarras, sardines, mullet, pinfish, sting rays, nurse sharks, manatees, turtles, blue crabs, hermit crabs, horseshoe crabs and snapper. The iguana has made a home here and is now prolific. The seagrasses surrounding Munyon Island should be treated with care, there can be fines levied if the grass is damaged.
