= Charles MacArthur =

American writer (1895–1956)

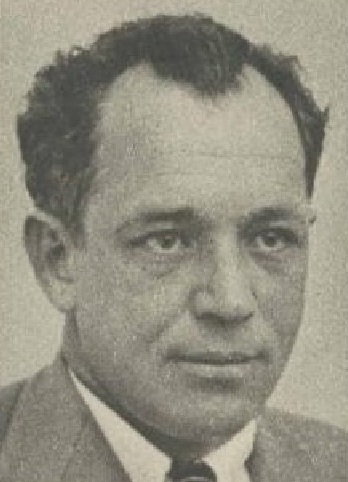
- MacArthur aboard SS Bremen, March 1933
- Born: Charles Gordon MacArthur; November 5, 1895; Scranton, Pennsylvania, U.S.
- Died: April 21, 1956 (aged 60); New York City, U.S.
- Occupations: Screenwriter, playwright
- Spouse: Carol Frink (m. 1920; div. 1926) Helen Hayes (m. 1928)
- Children: 2, including James MacArthur
- Relatives: John D. MacArthur (brother); J. Roderick MacArthur (nephew)

Charles Gordon MacArthur (November 5, 1895 – April 21, 1956) was an American playwright, screenwriter, and 1935 winner of the Academy Award for Best Story for The Scoundrel (1935).

== Life and career ==
MacArthur was born in Scranton, Pennsylvania, the sixth of seven children of stern evangelist William Telfer MacArthur and Georgiana Welsted MacArthur. Early in life, MacArthur developed a passion for reading. Declining to follow his father into ministry, he moved to the Midwest and soon became a successful reporter in Chicago, working for the Chicago Tribune and Chicago Daily News. MacArthur joined the United States Army for World War I, and served in France as a private assigned to Battery F, 149th Field Artillery, a unit of the 42nd Division, The Rainbow Division. He recounted his wartime experience in 1919's A Bug's-Eye View of the War. After the war, he wrote several short stories, two of which, "Hang It All" (1921) and "Rope" (1923), were published in H. L. Mencken's The Smart Set magazine. Eventually he settled in New York City, where he turned to playwriting.

MacArthur is best known for his plays in collaboration with Ben Hecht, Ladies and Gentlemen (filmed as Perfect Strangers), Twentieth Century and the frequently filmed The Front Page, which was based in part on MacArthur's experiences at the City News Bureau of Chicago. MacArthur also co-wrote, with Edward Sheldon, the play Lulu Belle, which was staged in 1926 by David Belasco. MacArthur was friends with members of the Algonquin Round Table, shared an apartment with Robert Benchley and had an affair with Dorothy Parker.

His second marriage was to the stage and screen actress Helen Hayes, from 1928 until his death. They lived in Nyack, New York. He was preceded in death by his daughter, Mary, who died of polio in 1949 at age 19. The shock of her death hastened MacArthur's own, according to those who knew him. Their adopted son, James MacArthur, was also an actor, best known for playing Danny "Danno" Williams on the American television series Hawaii Five-O. His brother, John D. MacArthur, was an insurance-company owner and executive, and founded the John D. and Catherine T. MacArthur Foundation, the benefactor of the MacArthur Fellowships.

== Awards and nominations ==
Academy Award for Best Writing, Original Story - The Scoundrel (shared with Ben Hecht) (1936)

- Nominations:
  - Best Writing, Screenplay - Wuthering Heights (shared with Ben Hecht) in 1940
  - Best Writing, Original Story - Rasputin and the Empress in 1934

In 1983, MacArthur was posthumously inducted into the American Theater Hall of Fame.

== Film portrayal ==
MacArthur was portrayed by Matthew Broderick in the 1994 film Mrs. Parker and the Vicious Circle.

== Selected works ==
=== Plays ===
- Swan Song (1946), (with Ben Hecht)
- Ladies and Gentlemen (1939), (with Ben Hecht), made into the 1950 film Perfect Strangers
- Johnny on a Spot
- Jumbo, (with Ben Hecht), made into the 1935 musical play Jumbo and the 1962 film musical Billy Rose's Jumbo
- Twentieth Century (with Ben Hecht), made into the 1934 film Twentieth Century
- The Front Page (1928), with Ben Hecht, made into the 1931, 1945, and 1974 motion pictures of the same name, the 1940 film His Girl Friday, and the 1988 movie Switching Channels
- Lulu Belle (1926), (with Edward Sheldon)

=== Screenplays ===
- The Girl Said No (1930)
- Billy the Kid (1930)
- King of Jazz (1930, uncredited)
- Way for a Sailor (1930)
- Paid (1930)
- The Sin of Madelon Claudet (1931)
- New Adventures of Get Rich Quick Wallingford (1931)
- Hell Divers (1931)
- The Unholy Garden (1931)
- Rasputin and the Empress (1932)
- Topaze (1933)
- Crime Without Passion (1934) (also co-directed)
- Once in a Blue Moon (1935)
- The Scoundrel (1935)
- Barbary Coast (1935)
- Soak the Rich (1936)
- Gunga Din (1939)
- Wuthering Heights (1939)
- The Senator Was Indiscreet (1947)
