= Keith Birdsong =

American illustrator (1959–2019)

- Born: July 14, 1959; Muskogee, Oklahoma, U.S.
- Died: June 4, 2019 (aged 59)
- Education: Self-taught
- Known for: Illustration
- Movement: Realism, Science fiction

Keith Birdsong (July 14, 1959 – June 4, 2019) was an American illustrator, best known best for illustrating covers of Star Trek novels, which usually depicted the various characters of the Star Trek television series and movies in a realistic manner.

== Early life ==
Keith Birdsong born July 14, 1959 in Muskogee, Oklahoma, where he spent much of his childhood. He was of Cherokee and Creek descent. At the age of 15, he moved to California and later to Texas, spending a year in each state. He then moved to Missouri, where he finished school and got married before joining the United States Army.

== Career ==
While in the Army, Birdson served in the 82nd Airborne Division. He completed several illustration projects for the Army during this time. Birdsong worked as a journalist before becoming a professional illustrator. As an artist, his works appeared in films, on book covers, and on collectors’ plates for the Hamilton Collection and the Bradford Exchange. He created designs for 13 stamps for the U.S. Postal Service, including one honoring American Indian dance and six Celebrate The Century stamps that commemorated the 1960s. One of them, issued on September 17, 1999, commemorates A trace of brightness on the horizon represents hope in this painting to commemorate Martin Luther King and his 1063 March on Washington for Jobs and Freedom, where he gave his "I Have a Dream" speech. the oil painting consists of a portrait of King set against the background of the Lincoln Memorial and its reflecting pool, where King delivered that speech.

His chosen medium was acrylic paint and colored pencil. although the paintings he did for stamps issued by the U.S. Postal Service, as mentioned above, were done in oil. He did illustration work for Star Trek, books of the cyberpunk role-playing game Shadowrun, and children's books such as The Halloween Hex: Hi-Tech Howard.

In addition to book covers, Birdsong's work has appeared in films, on collectors' plates for the Hamilton Collection and the Bradford Exchange, and on U.S. postage stamps, including an issuance honoring American Indian dance and six "Celebrate the Century" stamps that commemorated the 1960s.

== Persona life and death ==
Birdsong's family includes Sheila Corley, his sister DeeJay Gaugh, his daughter Candice Jordan, and two granddaughters.

In June 2018, Keith suffered a hemorrhagic stroke and doctors told him he would never walk or talk again, much less paint. However, Birdsong recovered and returned to painting. Birdsong died on June 4, 2019, as a result of injuries sustained in a car crash.

== Notable clients ==
- United States Post Office
- Paramount Studios
- NASA
- Lucasfilm
- Simon & Schuster
- Pocket Books
- New American Library
- Berkley Books
- Bradford Exchange
- Random House
- Prentice Hall
- Harlequin
- Ace Books
- De Laurentiis Studios
- Penguin
- Roc Books

== See also ==
- List of Native American artists
- Visual arts by indigenous peoples of the Americas
