= George E. Burch =

American physician

- Born: January 10, 1910; Edgard, Louisiana
- Died: April 15, 1986 (aged 76); New Orleans, Louisiana
- Citizenship: United States
- Scientific career
- Fields: Cardiology, Medical Research
- Workplaces: Tulane University

George Edward Burch, M.D. (1910–1986) was a shaper of modern cardiology during the middle part of the twentieth century, whose accomplishments included elucidating the fundamental physiological basis of important cardiovascular diseases, in addition to contributions to the teaching of medicine and cardiology. He was chairman of the Department of Medicine at Tulane University for many years. He is best known for his research in electrocardiography and vectorcardiography, for contributions to understanding viral-based cardiovascular diseases, for 12 books in the field of medicine and cardiology, and for more than 850 publications in the scholarly literature. He is also credited with the invention of the phlebomanometer, an instrument for measuring pressure in small veins. He elucidated effects of climate on the cardiovascular system and on congestive heart failure. He was a pioneer in the use of radioisotopes as tracers in medical research. Additionally Burch had wide influence as editor of the American Heart Journal (1959–82) and was an early anti-smoking activist.

The American Journal of Cardiology published a historical study of George E. Burch shortly after his death. A detailed biography of George E. Burch was published in 2010. An on-line biography is maintained by the Association of University Cardiologists. He has also been memorialized at Tulane University Medical Center in their organization of former internal medicine residents, the Musser-Burch Society. A bronze bust of George E. Burch by sculptor Jean Seidenberg is prominent in the main lobby of Tulane University School of Medicine. An oil painting, Portrait of George E. Burch, by artist George Rodrigue, resides at the New Orleans Museum of Art.

== Heritage and early life ==
Burch was born on January 10, 1910, as the oldest of 8 siblings in Edgard, Louisiana, a river community that is part of the German Coast of Louisiana, of heritage emigrating from French provincial Sainte-Marie-aux-Mines in the early 1850s. His father was a rural general practitioner who involved Burch as a child and teenager in his medical practice, instilling a sense of the excitement and compassion of medicine. These early life experiences in rural Louisiana exposed Burch to people suffering from a variety of tropical and subtropical illnesses, in addition to effects of under-nutrition and the common illnesses of the day. He developed early a compassion for the suffering of underprivileged people that remained with him for the duration of his career.

== Education and training ==
Burch's father died when Burch was 20 years old and in his first year of medical school. His medical school tuition was paid entirely by St. John Parish planter J.B.C. Graugnard, supplemented by working during summer vacations. He benefitted from receiving instructorships in college, impassioning him as a teacher. Burch graduated from Tulane University School of Medicine in 1933, and only obtained his Bachelor of Science degree two years after completing his degree as Doctor of Medicine (MD).

Following medical school graduation, Burch commenced an internship at Charity Hospital of New Orleans, having selected internal medicine for his field of study because of its breadth and depth. This period included a clinical rotation in the rural community of Breaux Bridge, Louisiana. Formal residency programs were then rare, and Burch was awarded a Clinical Fellowship as Assistant Instructor at Tulane University School of Medicine in 1934. This instructorship gave him formal teaching responsibilities and provided Burch with opportunity to work with practitioners and researchers in the emerging field of cardiology, including John Herr Musser, James A. Bamber, George Herrmann, and Richard Ashman. These experiences were formative in his career as a medical researcher.

== Early career ==
Burch's research emphasized fundamental physiological processes and their relationships to human diseases. For example, his invention of the phlebomanometer provided a tool to measure blood flow in the venous portion of the cardiovascular system for normal persons and for persons with certain cardiovascular diseases such as congestive heart failure. These findings were seminal at the time, ultimately leading to an understanding of the value of vasodilation in the treatment of congestive heart failure. Burch's research on the biokinetics of basic metabolites such as water, sodium, potassium, and other ionic species extended to diseases exacerbated in subtropical climates such as are extant in the southern United States. Two crucial periods in his career as a medical researcher were his 1939 - 1941 fellowship at the Rockefeller Institute for Medical Research and his 1948 service in the United Kingdom as a scientific officer of the US Foreign Service Reserve.

Burch was certified in the field of Internal Medicine in 1940 by the American Board of Internal Medicine, one of the earliest physicians to earn such certification, as specialist certification was nascent at the time. He guided the development of the certification process beginning in 1941 when he started organizing the oral examinations. He continued service to the Subspecialty Boards and other certification processes through much of his career.

As an educator, Burch continued clinical teaching at Charity Hospital of New Orleans, with training responsibilities for medical students, residents, and Cardiology Fellows. His teaching included developing the medical school staff, exposing faculty at all levels to scientific journals, scientific conferences, and seminars with eminent scientists.

== Later career ==
Burch became a senior academic with his 1947 appointment to the Chairmanship of the Department of Medicine at Tulane University, holding this position until his retirement in 1975, taking on emeritus status. The chairmanship coincided with his appointment as Henderson Professor of Medicine, an endowed position. As chairman, he created one of the first infectious diseases sections among medical schools in the U.S., certainly the first in medical schools in the American South. With medical school dean Charles C. Bass, he likewise instituted a section on Dental Health within the medical school, an action that remains uncommon today. He maintained his responsibility as attending physician at the same ward at Charity Hospital, sponsored the Hutchinson Clinic for medical education (created by Charles C. Bass), instituted a tutorial system for medicine residents, and led one of the earliest Fellowship programs for Cardiology Fellows.

During this portion of Burch's career, he continued his investigations of fundamental physiological processes underlying cardiovascular disease and delineated diagnostic procedures for certain cardiovascular diseases, including Papillary Muscle Syndrome and the ECG pattern characteristic of certain cerebrovascular diseases. Working with the extensive patient population of Charity Hospital, he was instrumental in the discovery of Hemoglobin SS and its relevance to Sickle Cell Disease. Burch was an early pioneer in the use of radioisotopes for diagnostic purposes and for understanding fundamental physiological processes, focusing on electrolyte metabolism in congestive heart failure. He held License Number 1 for the civilian use of radioisotopes. An area of clinical emphasis was his efforts on understanding the role of the psyche in illness.

Burch subsequently became editor-in-chief of the American Heart Journal, holding this position from 1959 - 1982.

He was one of the founders of the Association of Professors of Medicine and the Southern Society for Clinical Investigation. Additionally, he founded the Association of Former Chairmen of Medicine and the Association of University Cardiologists, becoming the latter's first president. Burch was chairman of the World Health Organization Expert Advisory Panel on Cardiovascular Diseases and Chairman of the Advisory Committee to the U.S. Army on Environmental Medicine and Physiology. The latter project involved successfully sending the first two monkeys into space. Burch also served as a consultant to the National Aeronautics and Space Administration.

Through his association with William T. Kirby, then chairman of the MacArthur Foundation, Burch conceived of the idea of the Foundation's Fellows Program.

== Legacy ==
The National Library of Medicine maintains a selection of Burch's works. The Tulane University History of Medicine Society also maintains selected information.

Burch authored or co-authored 851 journal articles during his tenure at Tulane University. His publications in The Journal of the American Medical Association can be found on-line.

Additional honors include the Guggenheim Fellowship in 1951 and the AMA Scientific Achievement Award in 1986.

The Tulane University School of Medicine graduating class of 1974, in association with former awardees of the Tulane's "Order of the Gold-Tipped Stethoscope", compiled a small red book, "The Quotations of Chairman George", in his honor.

The Smithsonian Institution administers the George E. Burch Fellowship in Theoretical Medicine and Affiliated Sciences.

The Matas Library of Tulane University School of Medicine maintains a collection of Burch's artifacts from his father's rural medical practice.

== Books ==
- G.E. Burch and T. Winsor, A Primer of Electrocardiography, Lea & Febiger publ. 1945; 2nd ed 1949, 3rd ed 1955, 4th ed 1960, 5th ed 1966, 6th ed 1972. Published in English, French, Spanish, Czech, Slovak, Italian, Serbo-Croat, Greek, Japanese, and Turkish.
- G.E. Burch and P. Reaser, A Primer of Cardiology, Lea & Febiger publ. 1947, 2nd ed 1953, 3rd ed 1963, 4th ed 1971. Published in English and Japanese. Reaser co-author of first edition only.
- G.E. Burch, A Primer of Venous Pressure, Lea & Febiger publ. 1950. Second printing Charles C. Thomas 1972.
- G.E. Burch, J.A. Abildskov, J.A. Cronvich, Spatial Vectorcardiography, Lea & Febiger publ. 1953.
- G.E. Burch, A Primer of Congestive Heart Failure (American Lecture Series), Charles C. Thomas publ, 1954.
- G.E. Burch, Digital Plethysmography, Grune and Sratton publ, 1954.
- G.E. Burch, Of Publishing Scientific Papers, Grune and Stratton publ, 1954.
- G.E. Burch, Of Research People, Grune and Stratton publ, 1955.
- G.E. Burch and N. DePasquale, A Primer of Clinical Measurement of Blood Pressure, C.V. Mosby publ., 1962.
- G.E. Burch and N. DePasquale, Hot Climates, Man and His Heart, Charles C. Thomas publ., 1962.
- G.E. Burch and N. DePasquale, A History of Electrocardiography, The Year Book Publishers, 1964.
- G.E. Burch and N. DePasquale, Electrocardiography in the Diagnosis of Congenital Heart Disease, Lea & Febiger publ., 1967.

== Awards and honors ==
- 1946 Award from the Mexican National Assembly of Surgeons for Distinguished Science, on plethysmography
- 1947 Gold Medal Award from the American Medical Association for his work on the mechanism of congestive heart failure as elucidated by radioisotope studies
- James B. Herrick Award of the American Heart Association
- Distinguished Fellowship Award of the American College of Cardiology
- Willard O. Thompson Award of the American Geriatrics Society
- 1970 Chest Journal Festschrift
- 1986 Scientific Achievement Award of the American Medical Association
- 1987 American Journal of Cardiology Festschrift
