= John D. MacArthur Beach State Park =

State park in Florida, United States

- IUCN category IV (habitat/species management area)
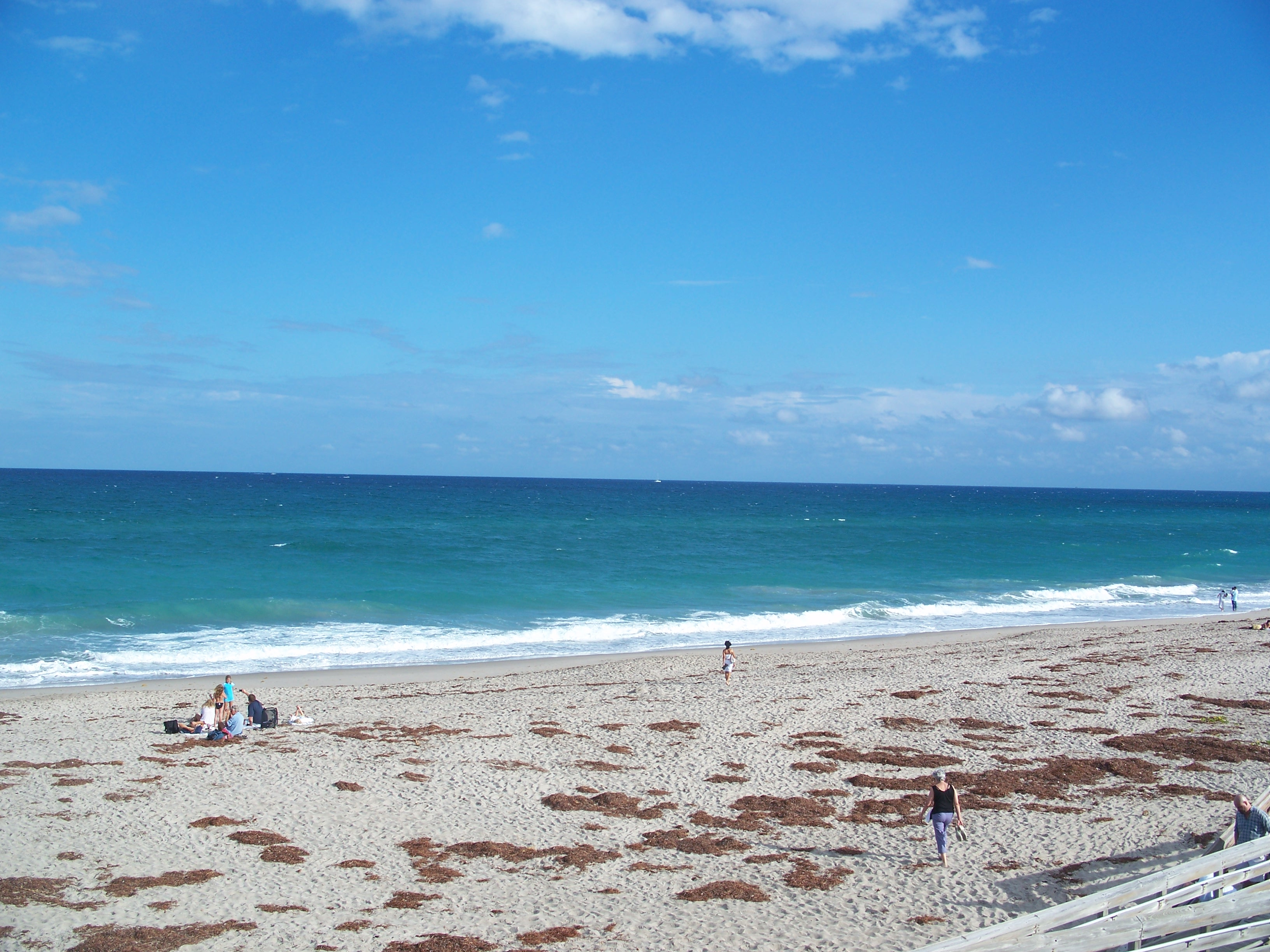
- View of the Atlantic Ocean

- Location within Florida Location within the United States
- Interactive map of John D. MacArthur Beach State Park
- Location: Palm Beach County, Florida, United States
- Nearest city: Village of North Palm Beach, Florida
- Coordinates: 26°49′52″N 80°02′46″W
- Area: 437.60 acres (177.09 ha)
- Established: 1989
- Visitors: 101924 (in 2003)
- Governing body: Florida Department of Environmental Protection

John D. MacArthur Beach State Park, named for John D. MacArthur whose Foundation donated a portion of the land for its construction in the 1970s, is located on and just north of Singer Island, Florida in North Palm Beach, Florida. It is the only state park in Palm Beach County. The park was first opened to the public in 1989. It covers 438 acres (1.8 km^{2}) on land and underwater, including an estuary crossed by a 1,600-foot (490 m) boardwalk, and Munyon Island (named after James Munyon), a wilderness isle in the Intracoastal Waterway that was home to the lavish Hygeia Hotel at the turn of the twentieth century. The hotel burned to the ground in 1917. Hiking trails and pavilions are open for public use on Munyon Island, which is accessible only by kayak or boat.

One section of the park was popularly known as Air Force Beach from the early 1940s until the renaming of the park because it was used by Palm Beach Air Force Base personnel. Nude bathing officially ended with the state's takeover of the park in 1982.

MacArthur Beach is a nesting ground for rare sea turtles, including the threatened loggerhead, the endangered green sea turtle, and occasionally the rare leatherback. Many species of birds also visit the park, including peregrine falcons, wood storks, and least terns. In addition to state funds and gate fees, the park receives community support through a local organization, Friends of MacArthur Beach State Park.

The William T. Kirby Nature Center features exhibits about the park's natural history, and includes live animal exhibits such as two loggerhead sea turtles. Beach Outfitters Gift Shop and Kayak Rentals, operated by Friends of MacArthur Beach State Park, offers a variety of gifts and provides rentals of kayaks, dive flags, lockers and binoculars.

== Gallery ==
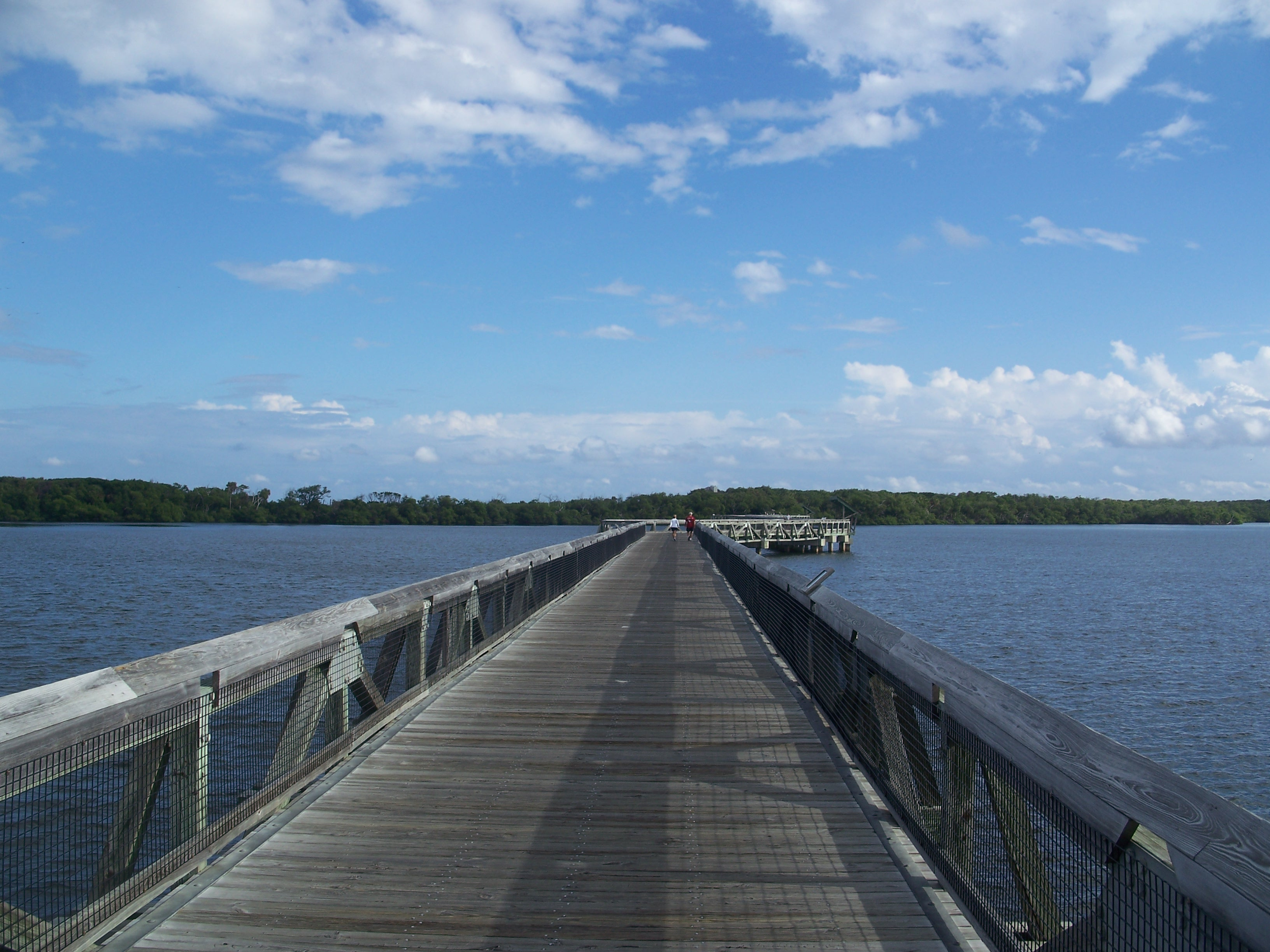
Boardwalk, looking east

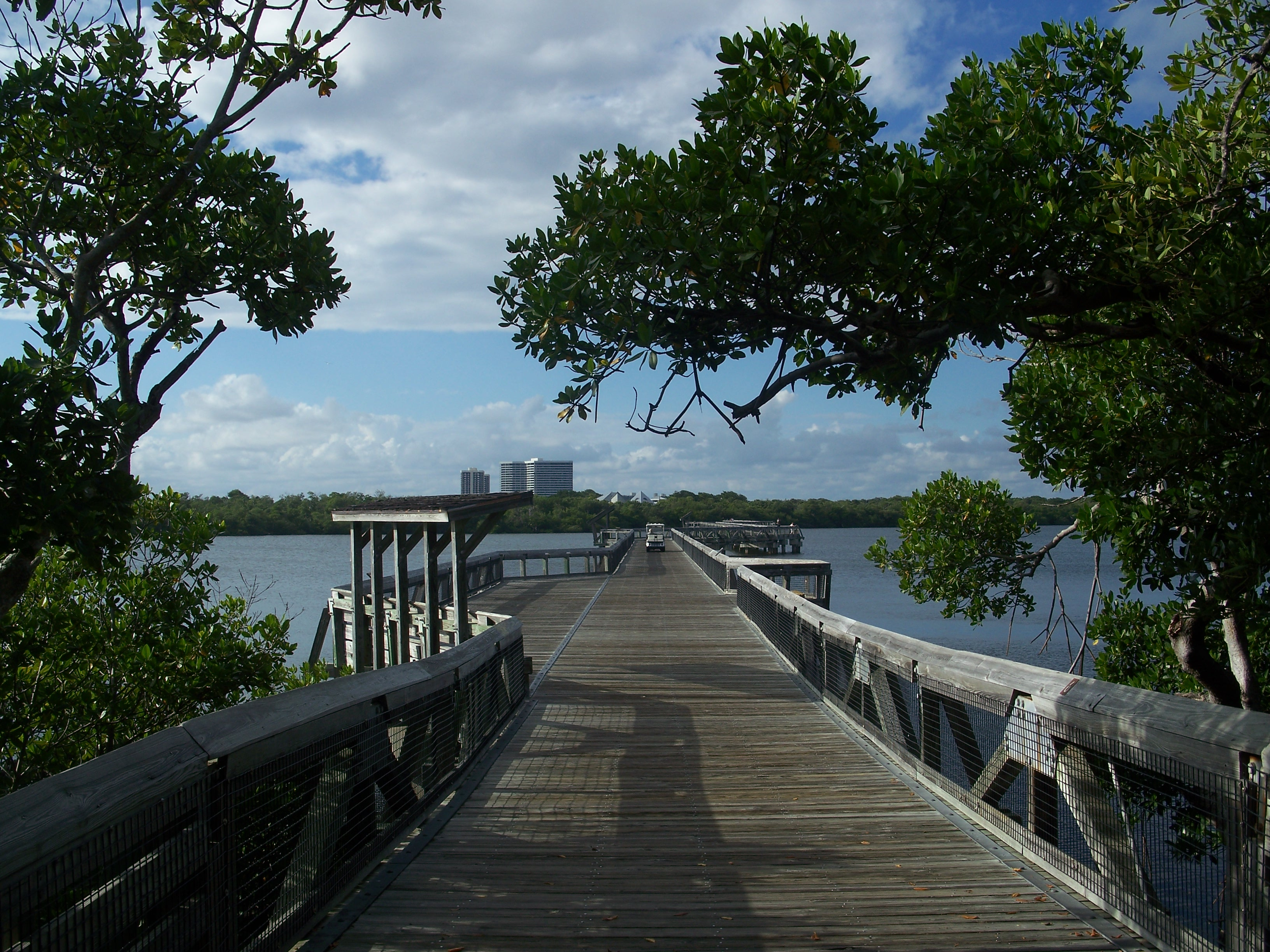
Boardwalk, looking west

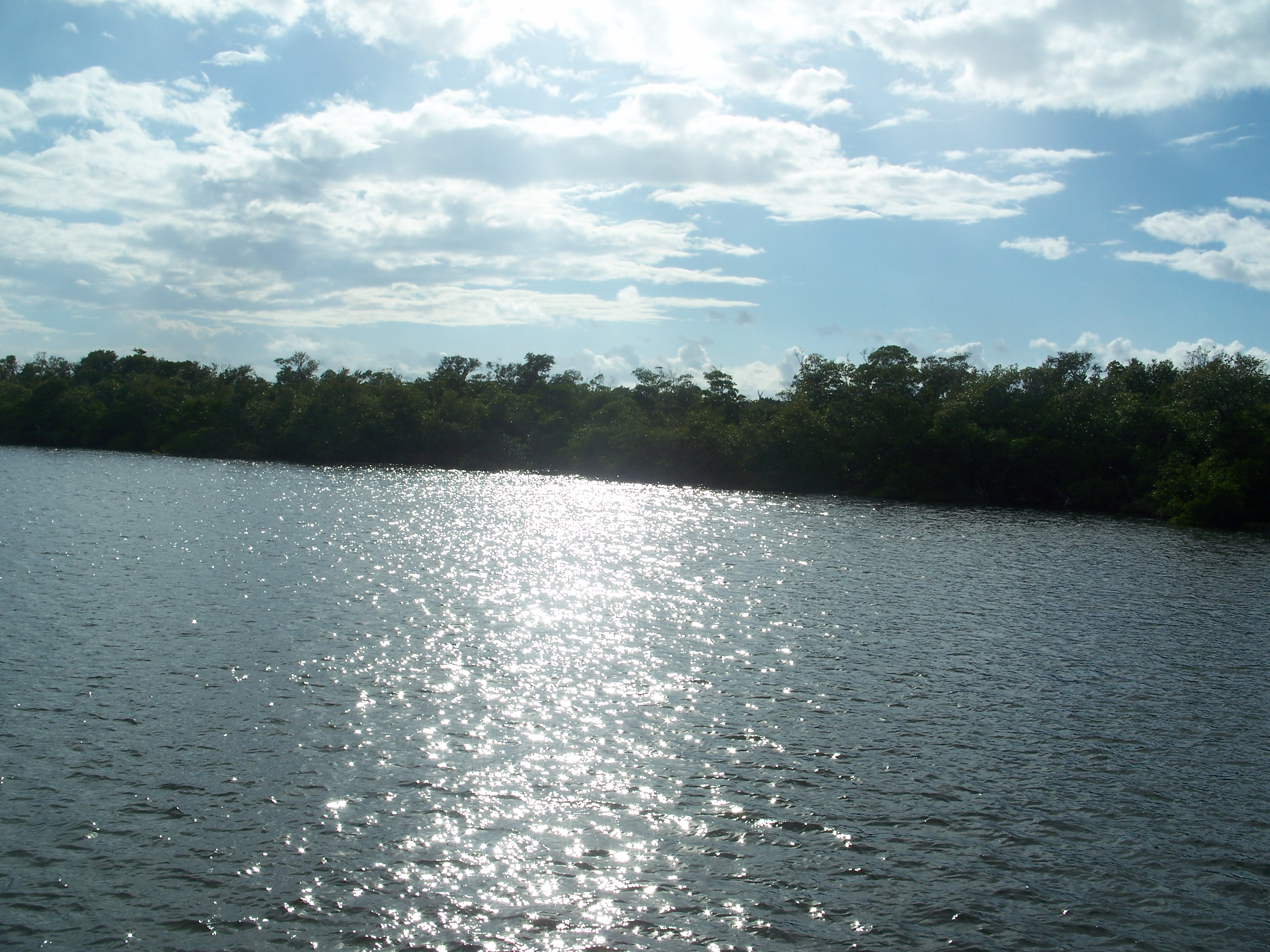
View of the mangrove-lined estuary

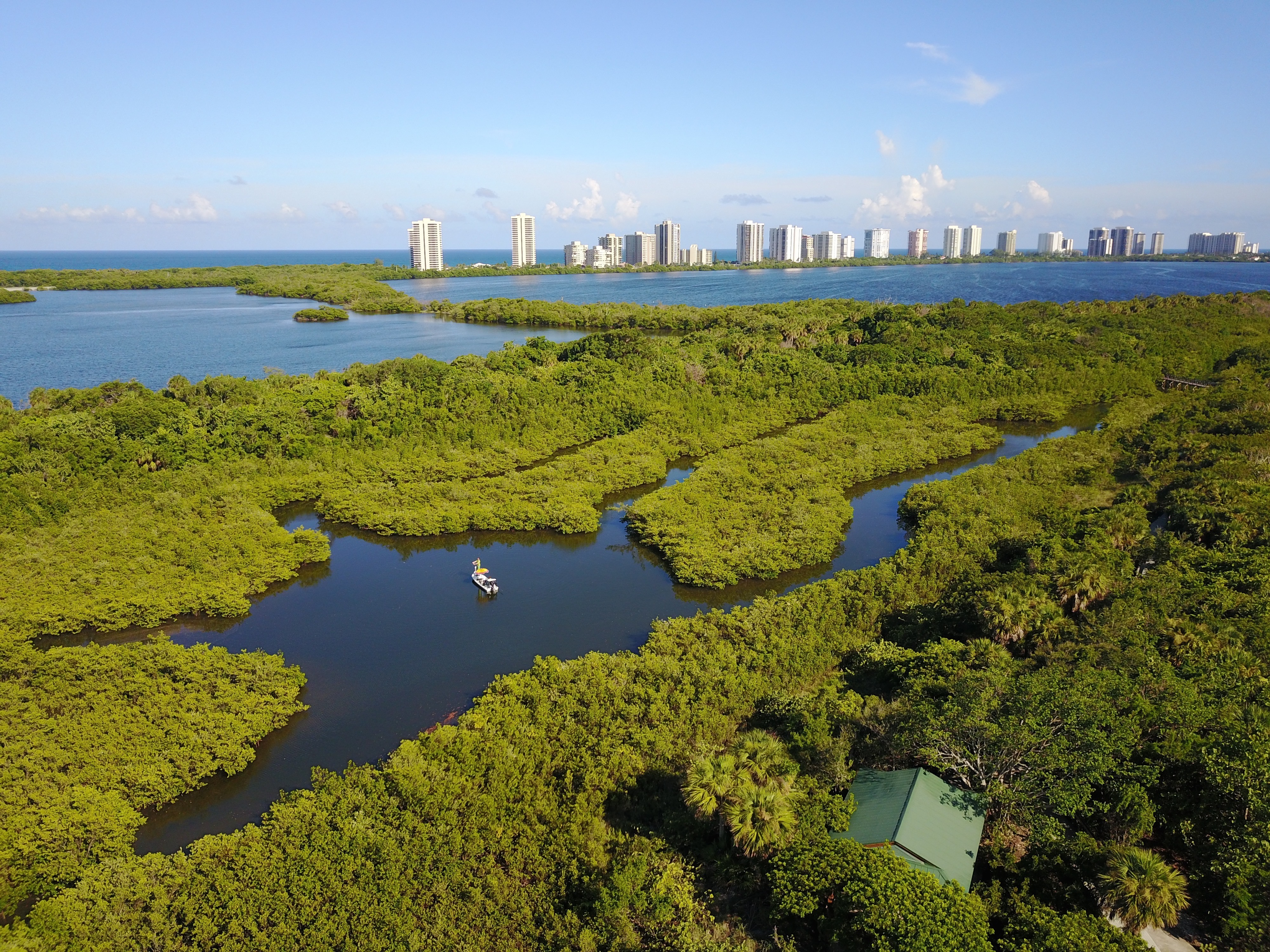
Aerial image taken above Munyon island with Singer Island coastline in the background.
