= North Palm Beach Library =

Library in Florida, US

Coordinates: 26°48′38″N 80°3′28″W

North Palm Beach Public Library
- Location: North Palm Beach, FL
- Established: 1969

Collection
- Size: 48,000 items

Access and use
- Circulation: 87,151

Other information
- Director: Zakariya Sherman
- Employees: 13
- Website: www.village-npb.org/188/Library

The North Palm Beach Public Library is a public library in North Palm Beach, Florida. The library is an independent library in Palm Beach County and is not a part of library system. The library circulates approximately 48,000 items per year. The library services 12,177 residents.

== History ==
The library first began inside the women's locker room of the village's old Country Club in 1963, before it was relocated to the club's dining room. The North Palm Beach Branch of the American Association of University Women (AAUW) helped establish the village's public library, including Patricia Atwater, past president of the North Palm Beach Library Society and mother of former Florida Senate President Jeff Atwater. The North Palm Beach Library Society threw annual masquerades since the year the library was established, to fundraise for the library; attendees were encouraged to dress up as book characters, while the best costumed couples won prizes.

The North Palm Beach Public Library relocated to its own building on October 4, 1969. When the library opened at 303 Anchorage Drive, only the upper level was finished. The main reading room was carpeted in gold; office and librarian space with automatic recording machines; a workshop with a fully equipped kitchen; a children’s reading area; a Florida book collection; a genealogy section; a record room; a financial news and information section; and about 11,000 volumes, which included books that were donated by the Lake Park, Lantana, and Riviera Beach libraries. The lower level remained a basement until the early 1970s. For many years, the lower level of the library was an adult computer lab and the children's section was upstairs along with the adult section. After a partnership with The Conservancy School as an after-school program location attendance soared from 2,441 in 2013 to 14,191 in 2017, creating a need for a larger children's section. The library hosted a grand reopening of a revamped Children's library in May 2018. The library celebrated its 50th anniversary in October 2019.

== Facilities ==
The library is a 24,893 square feet two-story building. The upper level of the library houses adult materials, computers, the Florida collection, a circulation desk, and the Director's office. The children's and young-adult materials and multi-purpose room, called the Obert room, are on the main floor.

"The local history and archives collection is located on the second floor of the North Palm Beach Library and available digitally."

== Collections ==
Formats include print books, large print, DVDS, CDs, audiobooks on CD, books on MP3, e-books, e-audiobooks, magazines and newspapers. The library offers Rosetta Stone Language Learning Software in 30 Languages.

In January 2017, the library introduced vox books to its children's collection, which enabled kids to read along with pre-recorded audio narration via a portable device on the inside cover of each book.

The library has both a Florida collection and genealogy collection. Their collection on genealogy is available for the community via partnerships with other organizations, including Ancestry.com, MyHeritage: Library Edition, and the Genealogical Society of Palm Beach County.

== Services ==
The library provides programs throughout the year. Public computers with Internet access are available. The library also offers fax, copy/scanner, meeting room, test proctoring, voter registration and Wi-Fi throughout the building.

One of their major services is enabling users to learn languages without paying a fee, through a partnership with Mango (in addition to Rossetta Stone); this program provides lessons that inclusively engage with auditory, visual, and kinesthetic learning styles.

Community-building services that are sponsored by the library, such as the Veterans Day and Heritage Day Parades, as well as the Library Out-of-School Program, are also partially funded through a partnership with Amazon.

The library also empowers community members to participate in preserving historical records and storytelling by asking current and former residents to share their accounts about the village's history with them.

The library accepts donations in good condition. Books, magazines, DVDS, puzzles and other materials are sold throughout the year, as well as during the Friends of the library's annual book sale. The Friends of the library also host an annual bake sale.

== See also ==
- Palm Beach County Library System
