= Anthony Ross =

American character actor (1909–1955)

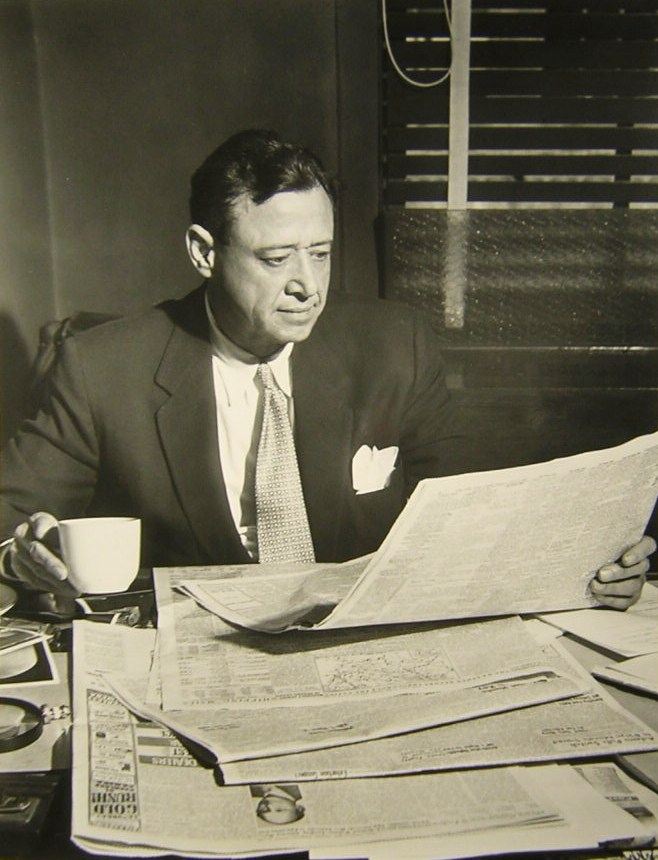
- Anthony Ross as Lt. Hale in The Telltale Clue
- Born: February 23, 1909; New York City, U.S.
- Died: October 26, 1955 (aged 46); New York City, U.S.
- Occupations: Stage, film, television actor
- Years active: 1932–1955

Anthony Ross (born Rosenthal, February 23, 1909 – October 26, 1955) was an American character actor whose career extended to Broadway stage, television and film.

Born in New York City, Ross was the son of Charles M. Rosenthal and Cora S. Rosenthal; he had his name changed legally. He was a graduate of Brown University and, while living in France, continued his studies at the Sorbonne and the University of Nancy. He may be best remembered for being the first to play the character of the "Gentleman Caller" in the original 1944 production of Tennessee Williams' The Glass Menagerie.

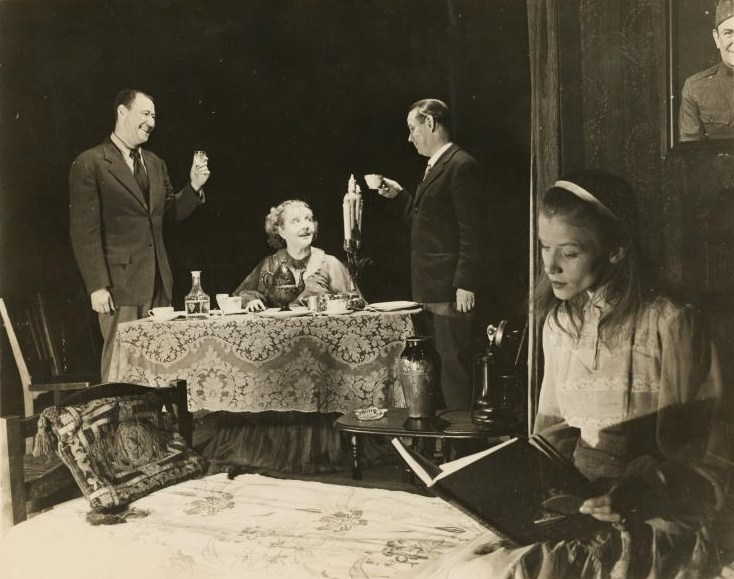
Publicity still of (left to right): Anthony Ross, Laurette Taylor, Eddie Dowling and Julie Haydon in the initial (1945) Broadway production of Tennessee Williams' The Glass Menagerie.

Ross made his Broadway debut in Whistling in the Dark (1932). He also appeared on Broadway as Leo in The Greatest Show on Earth (1938), and as a fictionalized version of Harold Ross, the founding editor of The New Yorker, in the 1950 Wolcott Gibbs comedy Season in the Sun.

Ross appeared in 20th Century Fox films including Kiss of Death (1947) and The Gunfighter (1950); in the Warner Bros. courtroom drama Perfect Strangers (1950) the Nicholas Ray-directed film noir On Dangerous Ground (1952) and in the popular serial Mysterious Island (1951). He also appeared as the "Producer" in The Country Girl, both the movie and the Broadway production as well as the "Professor" in the Broadway production of Bus Stop.

He appeared in many television productions, including the 1954 CBS series The Telltale Clue in which he starred as police captain Richard Hale.

== Personal life ==
He and his wife, Mary Jean Copeland, who was the assistant stage manager for the Broadway production of The Glass Menagerie, were the parents of a son, Stephen.

== Death ==
Ross was 46 when he died of a heart attack while sleeping in his apartment at 506 East 89th Street in Manhattan. A few hours earlier, he had played the supporting role of The Professor at the Tuesday evening performance of Bus Stop (play) at the Music Box Theatre.

== Filmography ==
Year	Title	Role	Notes
1944	Winged Victory	Ross	Uncredited
1947	Boomerang	Warren	Uncredited
1947	Kiss of Death	'Big Ed' Williams	
1949	The Window	Detective Ross	Uncredited
1950	The Vicious Years	Police Insp. Umberto Spezia	
1950	Perfect Strangers	Robert (Bob) Fisher	
1950	The Gunfighter	Deputy Charlie Norris	
1950	The Skipper Surprised His Wife	Joe Rossini	
1950	Between Midnight and Dawn	Police Lt. Masterson	
1950	The Flying Missile	Adm. Bradley	
1951	On Dangerous Ground	Pete Santos	
1953	Girls in the Night	Charlie Haynes	
1953	Taxi	Mr. Alexander	
1954	Rogue Cop	Father Ahearn	
1954	The Country Girl	Philip Cook	(final film role)
