= The Telltale Clue =

- Starring: Anthony Ross
- Country of origin: United States
- Original language: English
- No. of seasons: 1
- No. of episodes: 13

Production
- Producer: Charles E. Martin
- Running time: 30 minutes

Original release
- Network: CBS Television

The Telltale Clue, sometimes billed as The Tell-Tale Clue, is an American police drama that aired on CBS Television on Thursday nights at 10pm ET from July 8, 1954, to September 23, 1954. It briefly replaced The Public Defender, which aired on CBS in the same time slot from March to July 1954, returning to that same time slot from September 30 until the end of its run on June 23, 1955.

The program was produced by Charles E. Martin (1910–1983), and sponsored by Philip Morris cigarettes. At least two episodes were written by novelist and essayist Gore Vidal.

== Synopsis ==
The series centered on Det. Lt. Richard Hale, the head of the criminology department of the police department of an unnamed city, who used scientific equipment and analytical skills to solve 'perfect crimes'.

== Cast ==
Guest stars included Anthony Ross as Det. Lt. Richard Hale and Darren McGavin.

== Preservation status ==
Two episodes are available on YouTube, see CTVA entry at External Links.
