= William T. Kirby =

American lawyer (1911–1990)

William T. Kirby

William T. Kirby (1911–1990) was an Illinois lawyer who helped found and direct the John D. and Catherine T. MacArthur Foundation.

== Early and family life ==
Born in Chicago, Kirby's family moved to Waukegan, Illinois, where Kirby was educated in the local public schools. He then attended the University of Notre Dame and Notre Dame Law School during the Great Depression. During World War II, Kirby became an officer with the U.S. Army Corps of Engineers. He married and at the time of his death he would be survived by his son, three daughters; a sister, and four granddaughters.

== Career ==
After admission to the Illinois bar, in 1932 Kirby became a Judge in the Illinois Bankruptcy court. Later Kirby was an Assistant Attorney General for Illinois for four years. Kirby first drew public attention as the defense attorney for Preston Tucker, whose development and financing of an advanced automobile, the 1948 Tucker Sedan (also nicknamed the Tucker Torpedo) led to a controversial SEC inquiry and stock fraud trial in 1949. The jury found Tucker and his colleagues not guilty.

Kirby became the attorney for wealthy real estate investor and insurance executive John D. MacArthur. From 1965 through 1980, Kirby was a partner in the Chicago law firm of Hubachek, Kelly, Rauch & Kirby. Kirby was John MacArthur's attorney for about 25 years before retiring from the legal partnership to work for the MacArthur Foundation, which he helped create as described below.

== McArthur Foundation ==
Kirby and Paul Doolen, MacArthur's CFO, suggested that the MacArthurs create a foundation for charity but they left no instructions as to what the foundation's focus should be, that was left to the small board of directors whom John and Catherine MacArthur trusted. The legal document, written by Kirby, that created the John D. and Catherine T. MacArthur Foundation was two pages long and written in plain English.

In August 1978, John and Catherine MacArthur appointed Rod MacArthur to the Foundation board, Kirby suggested that the MacArthur Foundation create the Fellows Program. The idea first came to Kirby's attention through George E. Burch, a doctor at Tulane University. After bringing the idea to the foundation's original board members, Kirby was instrumental in shaping it.

William T. Kirby served as vice chairman for many years and chairman (1988–1990) of the John D. and Catherine T. MacArthur Foundation, and also supported public television and independent filmmakers.

While running the McArthur Foundation, Kirby also introduced and supported programs including:

- program funding mental health research
- focus on community development
- focus on the world's environment
- MacArthur's leadership in their first 15 years in funding independent media such as early funding of NPR, the creation of P.O.V, Ken Burns' The Civil War series, media arts centers across the United States, Bill Moyers' The Power of Myth and all of his subsequent programs, the MacNeil Lehrer News Hour, and the creation of ITVS (Independent Television Service).

== Death and legacy ==
Kirby died in West Bend, Wisconsin of a heart attack in October 1990. He was 79 years old and lived in Chicago.

== See also ==
- Messier, Dan (2002). Anatomy of an Award. Science and Spirit.
- MacArthur-Foundation.org: How did the Genius Grants really begin?
- MacArthur Foundation - Frequently Asked Questions
