= Ladies and Gentlemen (play) =

1939 American play

- Written by: Charles MacArthur and Ben Hecht

Premiere
- Date premiered: 1939
- Place premiered: Santa Barbara

Ladies and Gentlemen is a play by Charles MacArthur and Ben Hecht. The courtroom drama, inspired by a Hungarian play Twelve in a Box by Ladislaus Bus-Fekete, centers on the relationship that develops between two sequestered jurors, Miss Scott and Mr. Campbell, during a lengthy murder trial.

The play premiered in Santa Barbara, then ran for two weeks each in San Francisco and Los Angeles, with Helen Hayes and Herbert Marshall in the lead roles. It marked Hayes' return to the stage three years after her lengthy run in Victoria Regina.

The Broadway production was produced by Gilbert Miller and co-directed by MacArthur and Lewis Allen. The scenic design was by Boris Aronson. It opened at the Martin Beck Theatre on October 17, 1939 and closed on January 13, 1940 after running for 105 performances.

The play was filmed as Perfect Strangers in 1950.

== Broadway cast ==
- Helen Hayes as Miss Scott
- Philip Merivale as Mr. Campbell
- Pat Harrington as Patullo
- Robert Keith as Reynolds
- Roy Roberts as Ward
- Evelyn Varden as Mrs. Bradford
- Frank Conlan as Purdey
- Connie Gilchrist as Mrs. Rudd
- William Lynn as The Sheriff
- Donald MacKenzie as Hutchinson
- Guy Moneypenny as George
- Jacqueline Paige as Mrs. Moore
- James Seeley as Van Duren
- Joseph Sweeney as Butterworth
- George Watson as Pettijohn
- Edna West as Mrs. Wolfe
- Martin Wolfson as Herz
- Harry Antrim as a bailiff

== Critical reception ==
Of the play Time said, "[it] brings Near-Divinity Helen Hayes back to Broadway in her first new role there since December 1935. For this Broadway can rejoice, even though finding anything to rejoice at in the play itself is like looking for a needle in a Hayestack. After a two-month tryout, this thing of shreds & patches is still, like Gaul, divided into three parts — comedy, drama, romance — and, as in Gaul, the three parts are on very uncivil terms."
