= You Can't Be President =

2008 book by John R. MacArthur

You Can't Be President: The Outrageous Barriers to Democracy in America
- Author: John R. MacArthur
- Publisher: Melville House Publishing
- Publication date: 2008
- Media type: Print (paperback)
- Pages: 224 pp

You Can't Be President: The Outrageous Barriers to Democracy in America (2008) is the third book by journalist and Harper's Magazine president John R. MacArthur. It largely concerns the influence of money and class on the American political process.
