= Perfect Strangers (1950 film) =

1950 American film directed by Bretaigne Windust

- Theatrical release poster
- Directed by: Bretaigne Windust
- Screenplay by: Edith Sommer; George Oppenheimer (adaptation)
- Based on: Ladies and Gentlemen; 1939 play by: Ben Hecht; Charles MacArthur
- Produced by: Jerry Wald
- Starring: Ginger Rogers; Dennis Morgan; Thelma Ritter; Margalo Gillmore; Anthony Ross
- Cinematography: Peverell Marley
- Edited by: David Weisbart
- Music by: Leigh Harline
- Distributed by: Warner Bros. Pictures
- Release date: March 10, 1950 (New York)
- Running time: 88 minutes
- Country: United States
- Language: English

Perfect Strangers, also released as Too Dangerous to Love in some territories, is a 1950 American comedy-drama film directed by Bretaigne Windust. Edith Sommer wrote the screenplay from an adaptation written by George Oppenheimer, based on the 1939 play Ladies and Gentlemen by Charles MacArthur and Ben Hecht. The film stars Ginger Rogers and Dennis Morgan as two jurors who fall in love while sequestered during a murder trial. Thelma Ritter, Margalo Gillmore and Anthony Ross appear in supporting roles.

== Plot ==
Terry Scott, who is separated from her husband, and unhappily married David Campbell, the father of two children, meet when they are selected to serve on the jury of the Los Angeles trial of Ernest Craig. The defendant is charged with having murdered his wife when she refused to grant him a divorce. David wishes to avoid jury duty, but Terry tries to persuade the rest of the jury that the defendant is innocent until proven guilty. While sequestered during the lengthy proceedings, Terry and David begin to know each other and fall in love.

Juror Isobel Bradford, a snobbish socialite, tries to persuade the panel to vote for the death penalty. The mix of personalities in cramped quarters gives rise to tensions among the jurors.

== Cast ==
- Ginger Rogers as Theresa "Terry" Scott
- Dennis Morgan as David Campbell
- Thelma Ritter as Lena Fassler
- Margalo Gillmore as Mrs. Isobel Bradford
- Anthony Ross as Robert "Bob" Fisher
- Howard Freeman as Arthur Timkin
- Alan Reed as Harry Patullo
- Paul Ford as Judge Byron
- Harry Bellaver as Bailiff
- George Chandler as Lester Hubley
- Frank Conlan as John Brokaw
- Charles Meredith as Lyle Pettijohn
- Marjorie Bennett as Mrs. Moore
- Edith Evanson as Mary Travers
- Sumner Getchell as John Simon

Uncredited

- Ford Rainey as Ernest Craig
- Whit Bissell as Defense attorney
- Ned Glass as O'Hanlon
- Creighton Hale as Reporter
- Frank Marlowe as Reporter
- Frank Cady as Geologist
- Isabel Withers
- Weldon Heyburn

== Production ==
Production took place from late June to early August 1949. The film marked a reunion between Rogers and Morgan, who had previously costarred as lovers in the highly successful Kitty Foyle. Margalo Gillmore was a friend of Ladies and Gentleman writers Hecht and MacArthur.

== Reception ==
In a contemporary review for The New York Times, critic Bosley Crowther called the film a "patently jerry-built affair" and wrote:

Now the modest entertainment is an obviously hacked out affair which turns on a bit of terminal plotting that is flatly mechanical and contrived. The lady who loves her fellow juror, enlightened by this experience, is able to trick the other jurors who would convict an innocent man into seeing the light. In this convenient procedure, not only the rules of evidence but the limits of plausibility are unmistakably stretched. And this doesn't work to the advantage of Miss Rogers, who plays the noble dame, nor Mr. Morgan, who has to act the anguish of a juryman smitten by love. As though being locked up with a jury for several weeks weren't enough misery, these two have to simulate the fever of an inevitably frustrated romance. The job is practically hopeless with the material they have at hand. Miss Rogers and Mr. Morgan are pretty dreary throughout the film.
