= Joseph Sweeney (actor) =

American actor (1884–1963)

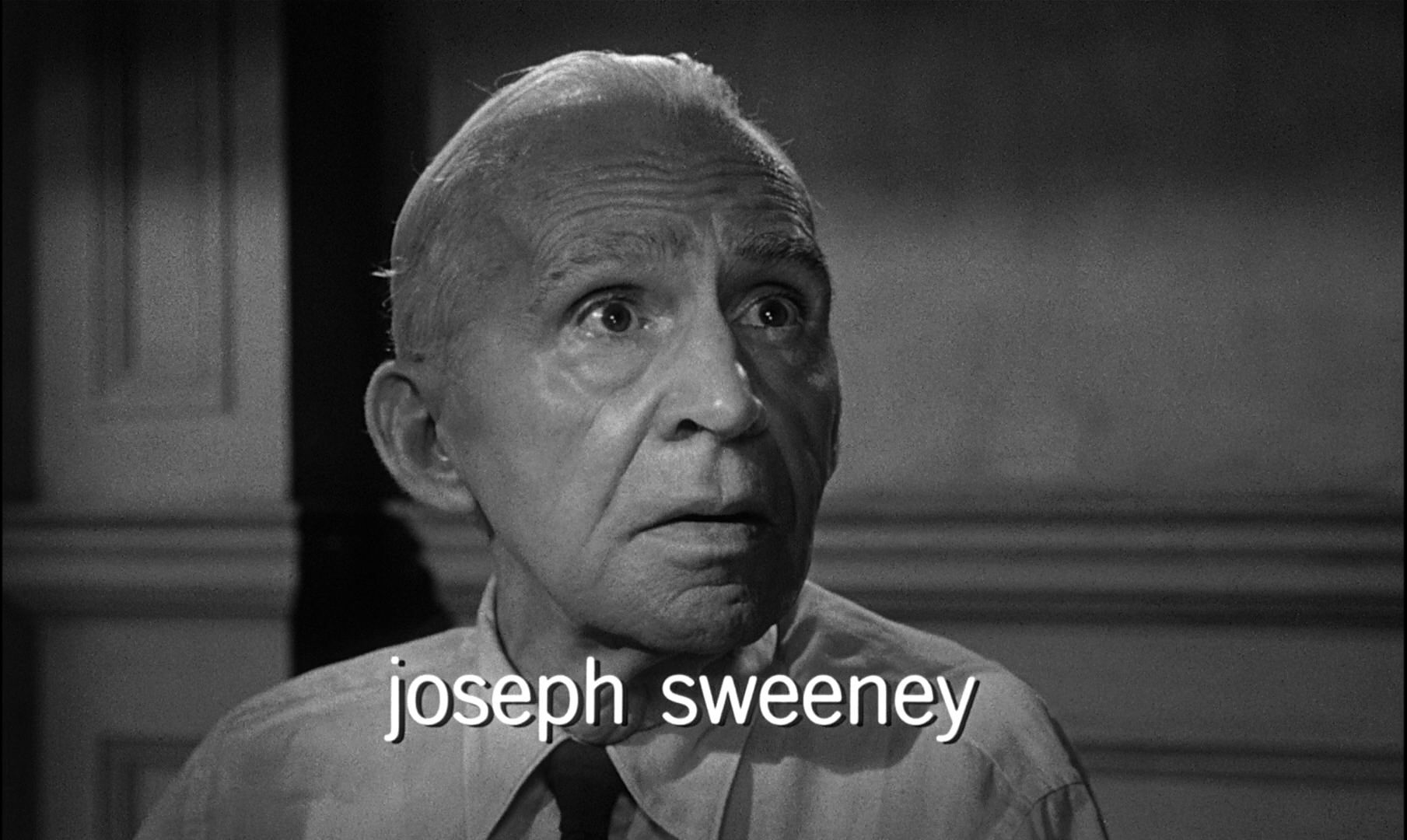
- Sweeney in 12 Angry Men, 1957
- Born: July 26, 1884; Philadelphia, Pennsylvania, U.S.
- Died: November 25, 1963 (aged 79); New York City, New York, U.S.
- Occupation: Actor
- Years active: 1918–1963

Joseph Sweeney (July 26, 1884 – November 25, 1963) was an American actor who worked in stage productions, television and movies principally in the 1950s, often playing grandfatherly roles. His best-known role was as the elderly Juror #9 in the 1957 classic 12 Angry Men, the role he originated in a 1954 Westinghouse Studio One live teleplay of which the film was an adaptation.

== Early life ==
Born in Philadelphia on 26 July 1884, he was raised in a rooming house in the same place with W. C. Fields.

== Career ==
In 1910 he started on an acting career and moved to Broadway, being fully active on-stage and touring throughout the United States. Sweeney debuted on stage in stock theater with a company in Norwich, Connecticut.

He had a successful career as a stage performer in such productions as The Clansmen, George Washington Slept Here, Ladies and Gentlemen, A Slight Case of Murder, Dear Old Darlin, and Days To Remember. In the 1940s, he made the switch to television as audiences' interests changed. He returned to the stage in 1953 to portray Giles Corey in Arthur Miller's The Crucible.

In 1949 he was a regular on the CBS series Wesley, and between 1950 and 1960 he appeared in leading and supporting roles and in installments of Lights Out, Kraft Television Theatre, The Philco Television Playhouse, Campbell Television Soundstage, Studio One, Producers' Showcase, Playwrights '56, The U.S. Steel Hour, The Defenders, Car 54, Where Are You?, and Dr. Kildare.

His most important performance in television was Twelve Angry Men (1954), by Reginald Rose. Sweeney played Juror #9, a.k.a. Mr. McCardle, and later repeated the role in Sidney Lumet film adaption alongside Henry Fonda, Lee J. Cobb and Jack Warden. He also played crafty and villainous roles, such as the larcenous former household employee in The Man in the Gray Flannel Suit (1956) or The Fastest Gun Alive (1956).

== Death ==
Sweeney continued to act until the time of his death on 25 November 1963 at the age of 79, appearing in numerous television shows and programs that year alone, including at least in more than a dozen during the last year of his life.

== Filmography ==
=== Television ===
Year(s)	Title	Role	Notes
1949	Wesley	Wesley's Grandfather	
1952	Studio One	Dr. Wall	"Plan for Escape" (TV episode)
1953	Studio One		"Music and Mrs. Pratt" (TV episode)
1954	Studio One	Juror No. 9	"Twelve Angry Men" (TV episode)
1954	Studio One	Janitor	"12:32 A.M." (TV episode)
1955	Studio One	Father Durand	"Summer Pavilion" (TV episode)
1955	Studio One	Charlie	"A Terrible Day" (TV episode)
1955	Studio One	Vernon	"The Prince and the Puppet" (TV episode)
1955	Studio One	Mr. Sweeney	"Three Empty Rooms" (TV episode)
1956	Studio One	Charlie	"A Man's World" (TV episode)
1957	Father Knows Best	Mr. Boomhauer	Season 4 Episode 3 - The Good Neighbor
1961	Naked City	Jacob S. Moreland	Season 3 Episode 12 - Bridge Party
1963	Car 54, Where Are You?	The Judge / A.E. Van Cleve / Jim McNaughton	4 Episodes

=== Films ===
Year	Title	Role	Notes
1918	Sylvia on a Spree	A Pal of Jack's	
1936	Soak the Rich	Capt. Pettijohn, 1st detective	
1940	The Philadelphia Story	Butler (uncredited)	
1950	Outside the Wall	Prison Hospital Inmate (uncredited)	
1956	The Man in the Gray Flannel Suit	Edward M. Schultz	
1956	The Fastest Gun Alive	Reverend	
1957	12 Angry Men	Juror No. 9 / McCardle	
