= Playwrights '56 =

American dramatic anthology TV series

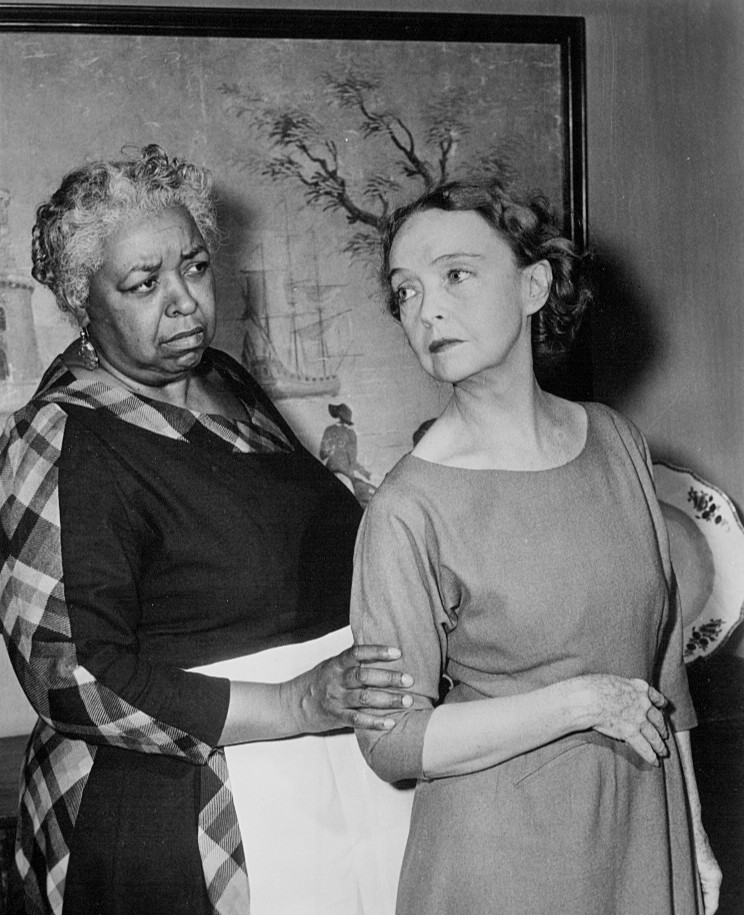
Ethel Waters and Lillian Gish in the presentation of The Sound and the Fury, 1955

Playwrights '56, a.k.a. The Playwright Hour, is a 60-minute live American dramatic anthology series produced by Fred Coe for Showtime Productions. Twenty episodes aired on NBC from October 4, 1955, to June 19, 1956. It shared a Thursday time slot with Armstrong Circle Theatre.

Stars included Mary Astor, Ralph Bellamy, Joan Blondell, George Chandler, Robert Culp, Paul Douglas, Tom Ewell, Norman Fell, Nina Foch, John Forsythe, Lillian Gish, Alice Ghostley, Lee Grant, James Gregory, Louis Jean Heydt, Steven Hill, Vivi Janiss, Henry Jones, E. G. Marshall, John McGiver, Steve McQueen, Dina Merrill, Jack Mullaney, Paul Newman, Phyllis Kirk, Edmond O'Brien, J. Pat O'Malley, Nehemiah Persoff, Tom Poston, Peter Mark Richman, Janice Rule, Kim Stanley, Warren Stevens, Karl Swenson, Franchot Tone, Ethel Waters, James Whitmore, Estelle Winwood, Jane Wyatt, and Dick York.

Among its notable writers were Horton Foote, Gore Vidal, Tad Mosel, Arnold Schulman, and A. E. Hotchner. Directors included Arthur Penn, later renowned for Bonnie and Clyde, and Delbert Mann, the 1955 Academy Award winner for directing Marty.

The program was sponsored by Pontiac automobiles. When it was canceled, an article in the trade publication Billboard cited cost as a factor, noting that it "ran about $30,000 a week more than its more successful counterpart". Most of the episodes originated from WRCA-TV in Brooklyn, New York, with the rest coming from KRCA-TV's Hollywood studios. After the program's June 19, 1956, broadcast, it was replaced by The Kaiser Aluminum Hour.

Along with Producers' Showcase, Playwrights '56 shared the 1956 prime-time Emmy for Best Art Direction – Live Series.

Partial List of Episodes of Playwrights '56
Date	Title	Star(s)
October 4, 1955	The Answer	Nina Foch, Paul Douglas, Albert Dekker
October 18, 1955	The Battler	Dewey Martin, Phyllis Kirk, Paul Newman
November 8, 1955	Snow Job	Joan Blondell, James Gregory, Meg Bundy
November 22, 1955	Daisy, Daisy	Tom Ewell, Jane Wyatt
December 6, 1955	The Sound and the Fury	Lillian Gish, Ethel Waters, Janice Rule, and Franchot Tone.
December 20, 1955	The Waiting Place	Kim Stanley, Louis Jean Heydt, Louise Platt
January 3, 1956	The Day the Trains Stopped Running	Joseph Sweeney, Elizabeth Patterson, Mary Welch
January 17, 1956	Lost	Steven Hill
January 31, 1956	This Business of Murder	James Whitmore
February 14, 1956	Return to Cassion	John Forsythe, Kurt Kasznar, Dina Merrill
February 28, 1956	Flight	Kim Stanley
March 27, 1956	The Undiscovered Country	Cyril Ritchard, Nina Foch
May 22, 1956	Keyhole	E. G. Marshall, Lee Grant, Henry McNaughton
May 8, 1956	You Sometimes Get Rich	Larry Blyden, Georgiann Johnson
June 19, 1956	Honor (final broadcast)	Dick York, Ralph Bellamy, Leo G. Carroll, Carol Goodner
