= The Bradford Exchange =

American collectibles producer

- Company type: Private
- Industry: Direct to Consumer Marketing
- Founded: 1973; 53 years ago (as The Bradford Gallery of Collector's Plates)
- Founder: J. Roderick MacArthur
- Headquarters: Niles, Illinois
- Key people: Richard Tinberg (CEO)
- Number of employees: 500+
- Website: www.bradfordexchange.com

The Bradford Exchange is an American producer and seller of collectible goods, jewelry, sports memorabilia and apparel. Now part of the Bradford Group, it was founded in 1973 as The Bradford Gallery of Collector's Plates by J. Roderick MacArthur. The company created its first live price quotation market in 1983, but increasingly turned to creating new lines of collectibles (rather than just facilitating exchanges between collectors).

The Bradford Group of companies, headquartered in Niles, Illinois, a suburb of Chicago, includes many groups of collectibles, including Ardleigh Elliott, Ashton-Drake Galleries, Bradford Editions, Bradford Exchange, Hamilton Authenticated, the Hamilton Collection and Hawthorne Village. Internationally, they have a presence in Canada, Australia, New Zealand, Germany, Switzerland, Austria, France, Italy, Sweden and the Netherlands.

Under the Ashton-Drake Galleries name, they have sold dolls like Gene Marshall and Blythe as well as Reborn dolls.

== Collectibles ==
The Bradford Exchange has experienced varying trends in collector interest across its core product categories, including collector plates, commemorative coins, figurines, and themed merchandise. During the late twentieth century, the company capitalized on the popularity of limited-edition collector plates, often marketed with the promise of future appreciation in value. However, the collector plate market experienced a significant downturn in the late 1990s and early 2000s. It has been reported that most mass-produced Bradford Exchange plates from the 1980s and 1990s now sell for a fraction of their original price, often under $15 on secondary markets, due to market saturation and changing interior design trends among younger demographics. Only certain themes, such as rare holiday collections, artist collaborations, or plates in pristine condition with original packaging and certificates of authenticity, tend to retain above-average value. The most sought-after plates often feature popular cultural icons or artwork by renowned artists, and complete series can command higher prices, especially when scarcity and provenance are well-documented.
