= James M. Munyon =

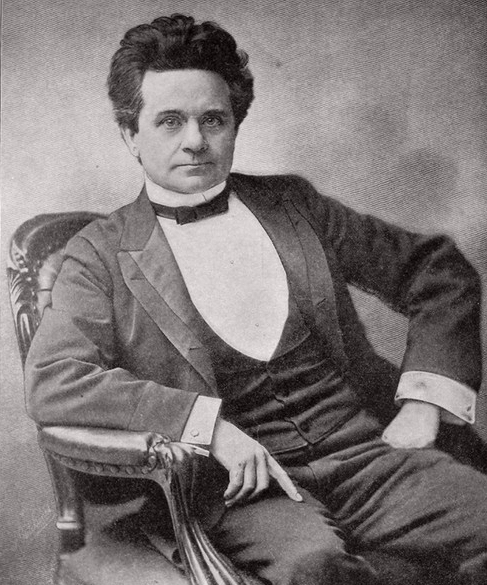
- Born: August 3, 1848; Thompson, Connecticut, US
- Died: March 10, 1918 (aged 69); Palm Beach, Florida, US

James M. Munyon (1848–1918) was an American known for homeopathic patent medicines, some of which he promoted at his Hotel Hygeia on Munyon Island.

== Career ==
Munyon was short, thin, athletic and handsome but it was his gift of gab and strong work ethic that led to several successful businesses throughout his career coining him the nickname "Money Munyon". His first career was as a publisher, but he soon moved on to creating homeopathic medicines in the early 1890s. He employed a staff of chemists and physicians, one of them Hawley Harvey Crippen. Munyon was known for his brilliant marketing strategies and, unlike many of the figures in the patent medicine arena, he sought the limelight. He made many claims for his medicines, some of which were unsubstantiated. Following the passing of the Pure Food and Drugs Act, the Munyon Homeopathic Home Remedy Company was taken to court over his claims. Munyon settled the suit for a small fee and removed the word "cure" from labels, replacing it with "remedy". His most famous one was named "Dr. Munyon's Paw-Paw Elixir." It was served at his resort, Hotel Hygeia, on Munyon Island. At the time his cures were highly regarded with the Philadelphia Times writing that "Professor Munyon is to medicine what Professor Edison is to electricity."

In 1900, he donated two million dollars to establish an industrial school for fatherless girls in Philadelphia, Pennsylvania, donating some of the land near his house. The school provided practical training and its operations were funded by Munyon. His policy was to give at least ten percent of his profit to charity.

He bought what is now known as Munyon Island in 1901 and completed construction of a hotel in 1903. The hotel was named Hotel Hygeia after the Greek goddess of health and it catered to wealthy northerners who spent the winters in Palm Beach, Florida. The five-story hotel had twenty-one rooms and eight baths. The hotel burned to the ground in 1917.

Munyon also owned land in Palm Beach, Florida in an area known as the Styx. He rented out properties there mostly to African-Americans, eventually selling the land to Edward R. Bradley.

== Personal life ==
He was married four times and divorced three times. One of his ex-wives, Dora Harvey, authored the 1900 book Half Hour Stories, published by Abbey Press. She was also active in the Merion, Pennsylvania chapter of the Daughters of the American Revolution.

His third marriage was in 1908 when at the age of 60, he married Pauline Neff Metzger, who was 24 at the time. In 1913 she filed for divorce and returned to her career as an actress.

He had two sons. Duke Munyon and James Munyon Jr.
