= Singer Island =

Peninsula on the Atlantic coast of Palm Beach County, Florida

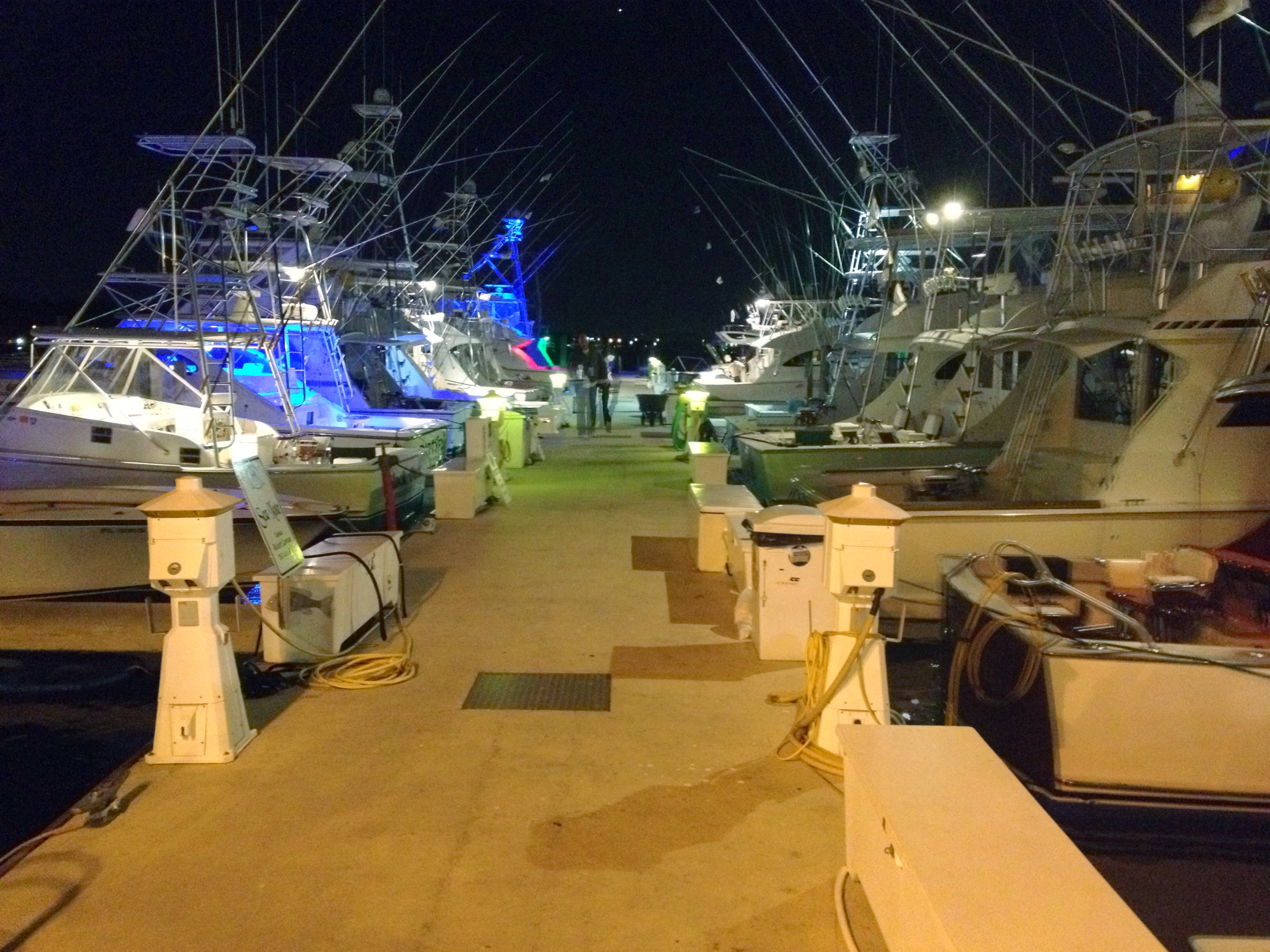
- Sailfish Marina on Singer Island, Lake Worth, West Palm Beach, Florida

- Singer Island Singer Island (North Atlantic)

Geography
- Location: North Atlantic
- Coordinates: 26°47′06″N 80°02′15″W

Administration
- United States
- County: Palm Beach

Singer Island is a peninsula on the Atlantic coast of Palm Beach County, Florida, in the South Florida metropolitan area. Most of it is in the city of Riviera Beach, but the town of Palm Beach Shores occupies its southern tip. Its latitude of is 26.784 N and its longitude is −80.037; Florida's easternmost point is in Palm Beach Shores. Before the Palm Beach Inlet was created, Singer Island was connected to the island of Palm Beach to the south.

== History ==
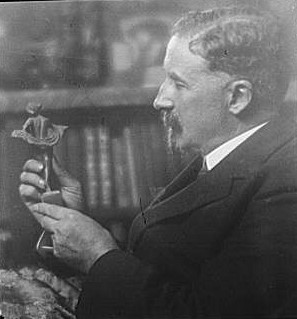
Portrait photograph of Paris Singer, 1916

Named after Palm Beach developer Paris Singer, a son of the Singer Sewing Machine magnate Isaac Singer, Singer Island has parks, marinas, hiking and bike paths, as well as 4.7 miles (7.6 km) of white sand beach that has been considered one of the top five beaches in Palm Beach County.

Singer Island is 3 miles (4.8 km) from North Palm Beach, 5.4 miles (8.7 km) from West Palm Beach, 5.4 miles (8.7 km) from Palm Beach Gardens, 6.2 miles (10.0 km) from Juno Beach, and 10.6 miles (17.1 km) from Jupiter.

Singer Island was originally planned by Paris Singer as a development called Palm Beach Ocean. Along with Addison Mizner, Singer intended to build a luxury resort hotel called the Paris Singer Hotel on the south end of the island, and a more typical resort called the Blue Heron toward the north, with homes and a golf course in between. Due to problems clearing titles, Singer's plans changed, and he decided to build only the luxury hotel on the island's south end and to call it the Blue Heron. Virtually every home lot in Palm Beach Ocean was sold, and $2 million (the equivalent of approximately $28 million in 2018) was poured into the Blue Heron. However, due to the abrupt end of the Florida land boom of the 1920s, not a single house was built on any of the lots, and the Blue Heron was left uncompleted. Its shell was razed in 1940. The Hilton Singer Island Oceanfront Resort now stands in its place.

== Notable residents ==
- John D. MacArthur
- Michelle McGann, professional golfer
- Clarence Clemons, member, E Street Band
- Guy Fieri, celebrity chef

Singer Island is home to thousands of condos. The tallest building is the 42-story "Tiara", which was severely damaged by two hurricanes in 2004, with residents displaced from 2004 to 2008, reportedly restored.

Singer Island is the setting of several Frederick Exley novels.

== Real Estate ==
Singer Island Real Estate Overview

Singer Island offers a refined coastal lifestyle defined by oceanfront condominiums, Intracoastal residences, and a limited selection of single-family homes. The market is anchored by luxury high-rise and boutique condo buildings with direct beach access, sweeping water views, and resort-style amenities, alongside waterfront homes prized for private docks and no-fixed-bridge ocean access.

Buyers are drawn to Singer Island for its balance of privacy and convenience—minutes from Palm Beach, Palm Beach Gardens, marinas, dining, and President Donald J. Trump International Airport.. Inventory remains limited, while supporting long-term value.

== See also ==
- Amaryllis (ship)

== Parks ==
John D. MacArthur Beach State Park, a coastal and tropical hammock and mangrove forest, this barrier island provides a haven for several rare or endangered native tropical and coastal plant species
