= North Palm Beach, Florida =

Incorporated village in Florida, United States

- Village
- Village of North Palm Beach
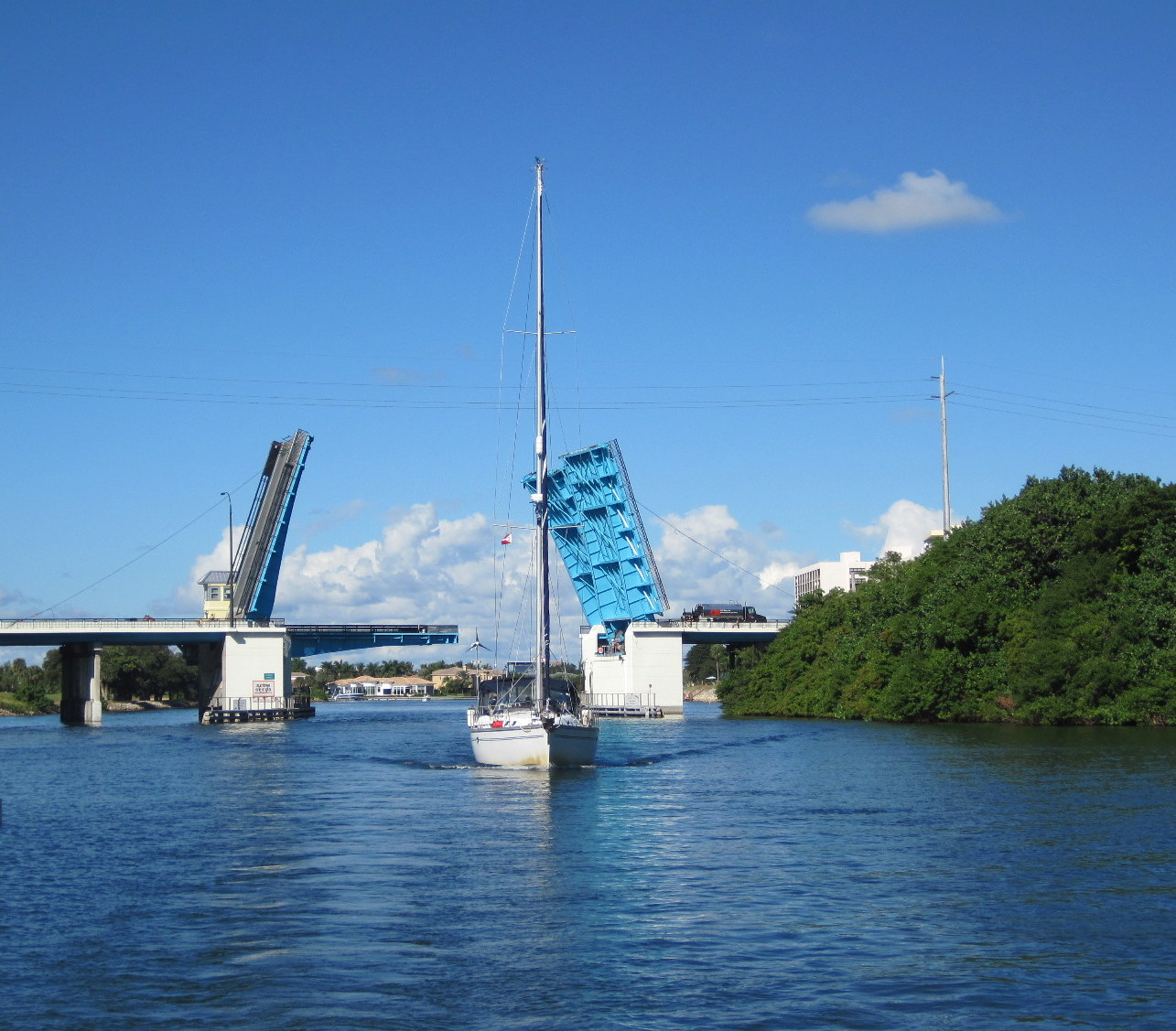
- Parker Bridge

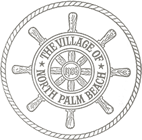
- Flag Seal
- Motto: "The Best Place to Live Under the Sun"
- Location of North Palm Beach in Palm Beach County, Florida
- Coordinates: 26°49′18″N 80°03′28″W
- Country: United States
- State: Florida
- County: Palm Beach
- Incorporated: August 13, 1956

Government
  - Type: Council-Manager

Area
  - Total: 5.29 sq mi (13.70 km^{2})
  - Land: 3.27 sq mi (8.46 km^{2})
  - Water: 2.02 sq mi (5.24 km^{2})
- Elevation: 7 ft (2.1 m)

Population (2020)
  - Total: 13,162
  - Density: 4,031.5/sq mi (1,556.58/km^{2})
- Time zone: UTC-5 (Eastern (EST))
  - Summer (DST): UTC-4 (EDT)
- ZIP codes: 33403, 33408, 33410
- Area codes: 561, 728
- FIPS code: 12-49600
- GNIS feature ID: 2407513
- Website: Village of North Palm Beach

North Palm Beach is an incorporated village in Palm Beach County, Florida, United States. It is part of the Miami metropolitan area of South Florida. The village won an award from the National Association of Home Builders as best planned community of 1956. The North Palm Beach Country Club is home to a Jack Nicklaus Signature golf course. The population was 13,162 at the 2020 US census.

== History ==
In 1954 for $5.5 million John D. MacArthur bought 2,600 acres (11 km^{2}) of land in northern Palm Beach County that had been owned originally by Harry Seymour Kelsey and later by Sir Harry Oakes. The land included most of today's North Palm Beach as well as Lake Park, Palm Beach Gardens and Palm Beach Shores. MacArthur then began developing what is now North Palm Beach, which sat on former mangrove swamps and farm land. The area was punctuated only by Monet Road and Johnson Dairy Road to the north and south and US 1 and Prosperity Farms Road to the east and west.

Full-scale development and incorporation as a village occurred nearly simultaneously in 1956, with extensive dredging creating waterfront cul-de-sacs, and the development of a new east-west artery, Lighthouse Drive, connecting Old Dixie Highway and the newly aligned US 1. US 1 was widened and became the main office and civic corridor. Sir Harry Oakes' castle-like home on US 1 became the clubhouse for the North Palm Beach Country Club, which is located on the village island surrounded by the Intracoastal Waterway reached by three bridges Lighthouse Drive bridge to the West, the Earmon River bridge to the south, and the Parker drawbridge to the north.

In 1960–1961, North Palm Beach elected Walter E. Thomas, Jr. as its fourth Mayor. Walter and his wife Jackie and four children (Ted, Larry, Jim, and Pam) were the 55th family to move into the Village, arriving in 1957.

Lake Park West Road was also extended from Old Dixie Highway to US 1 and was renamed Northlake Boulevard, becoming the village's main commercial corridor.

The North Palm Beach Country Club is publicly owned by the Village of North Palm Beach and is open to the general public seven days a week. It first opened in 1963. The original mid-century modernism club house was demolished in 2018 and a new clubhouse tagged as Anglo-Caribbean was built in its place in 2019.

== Geography ==
According to the United States Census Bureau, the village has a total area of 5.8 square miles (15 km^{2}), of which 3.6 square miles (9.3 km^{2}) is land and 2.2 square miles (5.7 km^{2}) (38.62%) is water.

== Demographics ==
Historical population
Census	Pop.	Note	%±
1960	2,684		—
1970	9,035		236.6%
1980	11,344		25.6%
1990	11,343		0.0%
2000	12,064		6.4%
2010	12,015		−0.4%
2020	13,162		9.5%
U.S. Decennial Census

=== 2020 census ===
As of the 2020 census, North Palm Beach had a population of 13,162. The median age was 55.5 years. 12.2% of residents were under the age of 18 and 32.6% of residents were 65 years of age or older. For every 100 females there were 94.1 males, and for every 100 females age 18 and over there were 92.1 males age 18 and over.

100.0% of residents lived in urban areas, while 0.0% lived in rural areas.

There were 6,692 households in North Palm Beach, of which 15.7% had children under the age of 18 living in them. Of all households, 42.6% were married-couple households, 20.9% were households with a male householder and no spouse or partner present, and 29.6% were households with a female householder and no spouse or partner present. About 38.7% of all households were made up of individuals and 20.3% had someone living alone who was 65 years of age or older.

There were 8,023 housing units, of which 16.6% were vacant. The homeowner vacancy rate was 1.9% and the rental vacancy rate was 9.9%.

According to 2020 ACS 5-year estimates, there were 3,426 families residing in the village.

North Palm Beach racial composition (Hispanics excluded from racial categories) (NH = Non-Hispanic)
Race	Number	Percentage
White (NH)	10,822	82.22%
Black or African American (NH)	336	2.55%
Native American or Alaska Native (NH)	11	0.08%
Asian (NH)	250	1.90%
Pacific Islander or Native Hawaiian (NH)	12	0.09%
Some other race (NH)	43	0.33%
Two or more races/Multiracial (NH)	449	3.41%
Hispanic or Latino (any race)	1,239	9.41%
Total	13,162	

=== 2010 census ===
North Palm Beach Demographics
2010 Census	North Palm Beach	Palm Beach County	Florida
Total population	12,015	1,320,134	18,801,310
Population, percent change, 2000 to 2010	–0.4%	+16.7%	+17.6%
Population density	3,347.8/sq mi	670.2/sq mi	350.6/sq mi
White or Caucasian (including White Hispanic)	93.3%	73.5%	75.0%
(Non-Hispanic White or Caucasian)	87.8%	60.1%	57.9%
Black or African-American	2.7%	17.3%	16.0%
Hispanic or Latino (of any race)	6.9%	19.0%	22.5%
Asian	1.7%	2.4%	2.4%
Native American or Native Alaskan	0.1%	0.5%	0.4%
Pacific Islander or Native Hawaiian	0.0%	0.1%	0.1%
Two or more races (Multiracial)	1.3%	2.3%	2.5%
Some Other Race	0.9%	3.9%	3.6%

As of the 2010 United States census, there were 12,015 people, 6,025 households, and 3,186 families residing in the village.

=== 2000 census ===
In 2000, 15.3% had children under the age of 18 living with them, 42.1% were married couples living together, 6.9% had a female householder with no husband present, and 47.9% were non-families. 39.2% of all households were made up of individuals, and 18.3% had someone living alone who was 65 years of age or older. The average household size was 1.97 and the average family size was 2.63.

As of the census of 2000, there were 12,064 people, 6,196 households, and 3,327 families residing in the village. The population density was 1,308.4/km^{2} (3,388.0/mi^{2}). There were 7,325 housing units at an average density of 794.4/km^{2} (2,057.1/mi^{2}). The racial makeup of the village was 96.22% White (93.4% were Non-Hispanic White), 0.93% African American, 0.09% Native American, 1.22% Asian, 0.02% Pacific Islander, 0.50% from other races, and 1.02% from two or more races. Hispanic or Latino of any race were 3.53% of the population.

As of 2000, there were 6,196 households out of which 15.1% had children under the age of 18 living with them, 45.4% were married couples living together, 6.0% had a female householder with no husband present, and 46.3% were non-families. 39.3% of all households were made up of individuals and 19.1% had someone living alone who was 65 years of age or older. The average household size was 1.95 and the average family size was 2.58.

In 2000, the village the population was spread out with 14.3% under the age of 18, 3.9% from 18 to 24, 24.2% from 25 to 44, 26.8% from 45 to 64, and 30.8% who were 65 years of age or older. The median age was 50 years. For every 100 females there were 94.7 males. For every 100 females age 18 and over, there were 92.1 males.

In 2000, the median income for a household in the village was $53,163, and the median income for a family was $69,104. Males had a median income of $41,709 versus $32,080 for females. The per capita income for the village was $39,564. About 1.3% of families and 3.9% of the population were below the poverty line, including 0.9% of those under age 18 and 4.3% of those age 65 or over.

As of 2000, speakers of English as a first language accounted for 92.78% of all residents, while Spanish consisted of 3.91%, French was at 1.32%, German made up 0.92%, Italian 0.66%, and Greek was the mother tongue of 0.39% of the population.

== Landmarks ==
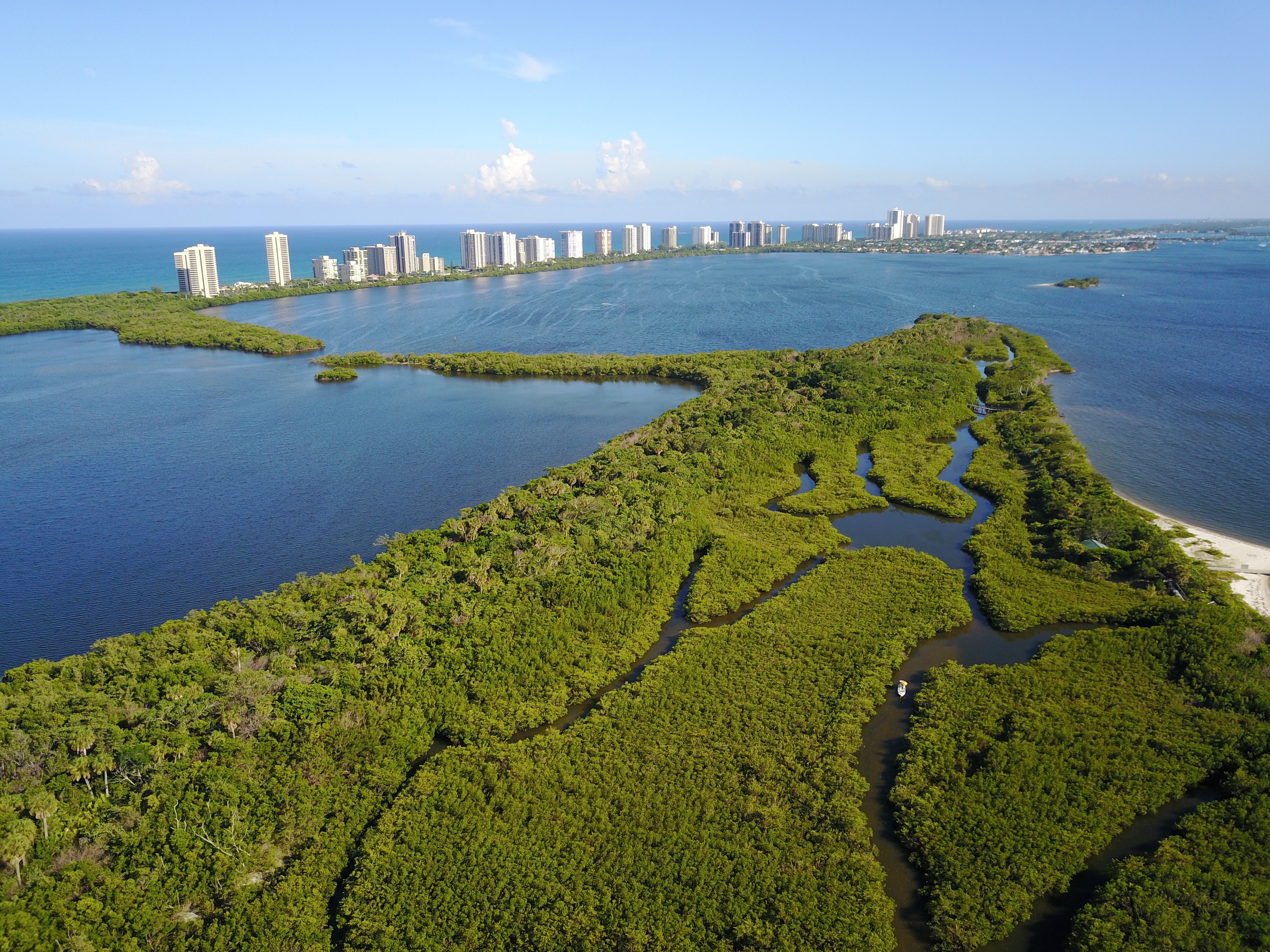
Munyon Island located at John D. MacArthur State Park in North Palm Beach, Florida.

*Florida Power & Light Office (contains a historical museum)

- John D. MacArthur Beach State Park is located nearby.
- Parker Bridge

== Libraries ==
The North Palm Beach Library services the village. The village library opened on Saturday, October 4, 1969, at 303 Anchorage Drive. The North Palm Beach Public Library provides programs throughout the year including; story-time, author lectures, genealogy group meetings, book club discussions and other special events.

== Notable people ==
- Jeff Atwater, Chief Financial Officer of Florida
- Chris Cline, Coal mining billionaire – Regarded by Bloomberg as New King Coal
- Gardner Dickinson, PGA golfer
- Mike Douglas, Famous American entertainer
- Stanley Druckenmiller, hedge fund manager, former portfolio manager for George Soros
- Larry Ellison, co-founder of Oracle Corporation
- Ryan Klesko, Retired Major League Baseball first baseman
- Tom Lewis, U.S. Representative (1983–1995)
- Lou Nanne, Retired NHL player and executive
- Jack Nicklaus, Golfer and course architect
- Elin Nordegren, Swedish former model and the ex-wife of golfer Tiger Woods
- Sir Harry Oakes, early developer of the area
