= Palm Beach Shores, Florida =

Town in the state of Florida, United States

- Town
- Town of Palm Beach Shores
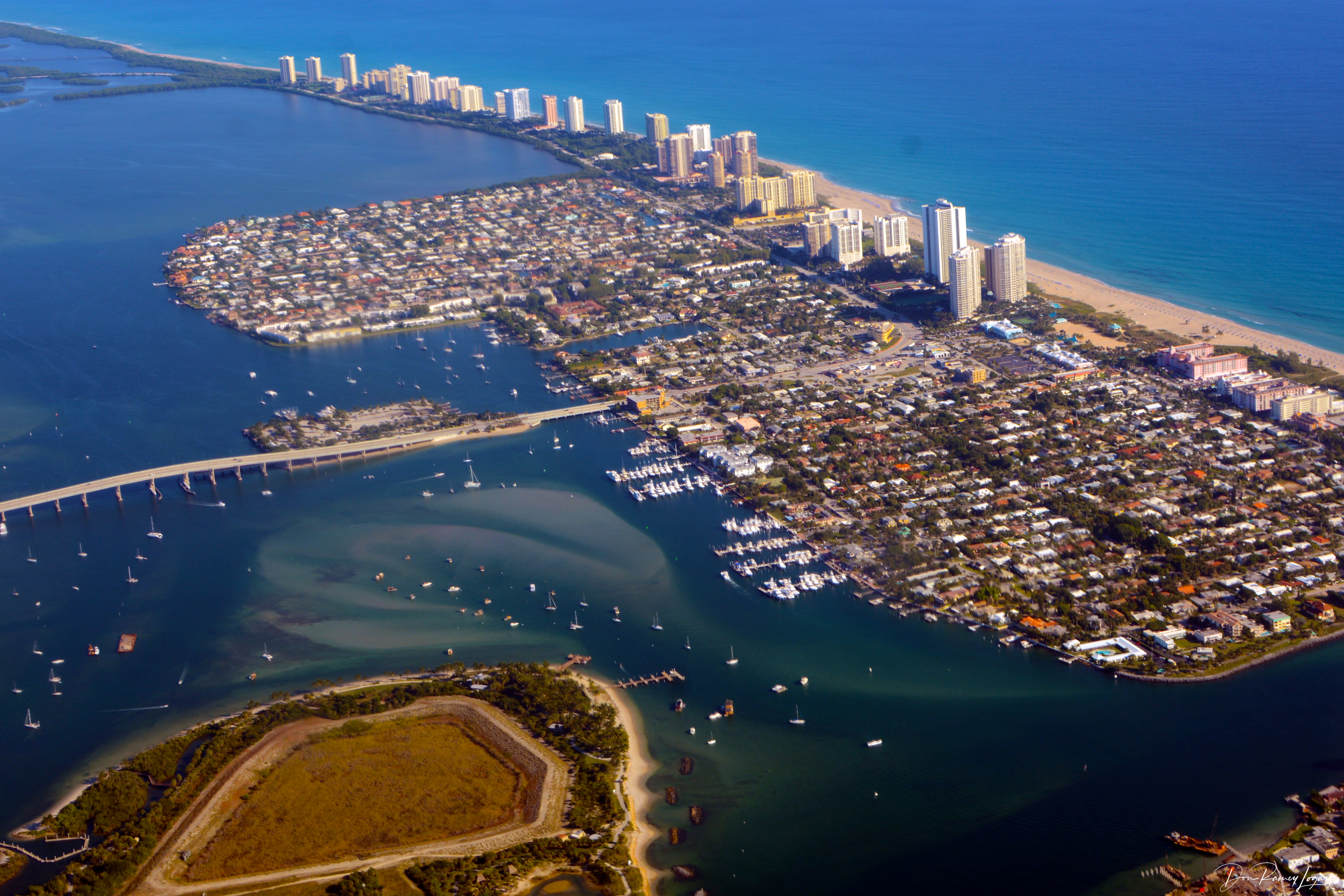
- Aerial view of Palm Beach Shores, Florida

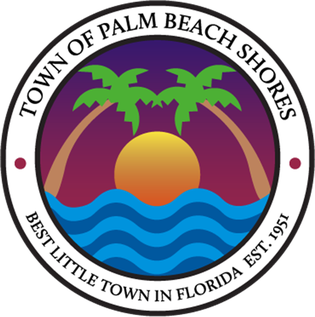
- Seal
- Motto: "Best Little Town in Florida"
- Location of Palm Beach Shores in Palm Beach County, Florida
- Coordinates: 26°46′38″N 80°02′05″W
- Country: United States
- State: Florida
- County: Palm Beach
- Settled (Inlet City Settlement): 1906
- Incorporated (Town of Palm Beach Shores): 1947
- Formally Incorporated (Town of Palm Beach Shores): 1951

Government
  - Type: Commission-Manager
  - Mayor: Alan D. Fiers
  - Vice Mayor: Tracy Larcher
  - Commissioners: Kathleen McGahran, Roby DeReuil, and Steven Smith
  - Town Clerk: Karen E. Hancsak
  - Town Treasurer: Darlene Hopper

Area
  - Total: 0.52 sq mi (1.35 km^{2})
  - Land: 0.29 sq mi (0.76 km^{2})
  - Water: 0.23 sq mi (0.59 km^{2})
- Elevation: 10 ft (3.0 m)

Population (2020)
  - Total: 1,330
  - Density: 4,537.1/sq mi (1,751.78/km^{2})
- Time zone: UTC-5 (Eastern (EST))
  - Summer (DST): UTC-4 (EDT)
- ZIP code: 33404
- Area codes: 561, 728
- FIPS code: 12-54150
- GNIS feature ID: 2407068
- Website: www.palmbeachshoresfl.us

Palm Beach Shores is a town in Palm Beach County, Florida, United States. The town is part of the Miami metropolitan area of South Florida. The population was 1,330 at the 2020 US census.

== Geography ==
The Town of Palm Beach Shores is located on Singer Island.

According to the United States Census Bureau, the town has a total area of 0.4 square miles (1.0 km^{2}). 0.2 square miles (0.52 km^{2}) of it is land and 0.1 square miles (0.26 km^{2}) of it (34.21%) is water.

The town occupies the southern tip of Singer Island. It borders the City of Riviera Beach on the north, the Atlantic Ocean on the east and Lake Worth Lagoon on the west. On the south, the Palm Beach Inlet separates it from the town of Palm Beach. Florida's easternmost point is in Palm Beach Shores. The town contains many mid-century homes, many of which have been restored or are being restored, giving the town the charming character of "a slice of old Florida".

=== Climate ===
The Town of Palm Beach Shores has a tropical climate, similar to the climate found in much of the Caribbean. It is part of the only region in the 48 contiguous states that falls under that category. More specifically, it generally has a tropical savanna climate (Köppen climate classification: Aw), bordering a tropical monsoon climate (Köppen climate classification: Am).

== Demographics ==
Historical population
| Census | Pop. | Note | %± |
|---|---|---|---|
| 1960 | 885 | | — |
| 1970 | 1,214 | | 37.2% |
| 1980 | 1,232 | | 1.5% |
| 1990 | 1,040 | | −15.6% |
| 2000 | 1,269 | | 22.0% |
| 2010 | 1,142 | | −10.0% |
| 2020 | 1,330 | | 16.5% |
U.S. Decennial Census

=== Racial and ethnic composition ===
Palm Beach Shores racial composition (Hispanics excluded from racial categories) (NH = Non-Hispanic)
| Race | Pop 2010 | Pop 2020 | % 2010 | % 2020 |
|---|---|---|---|---|
| White (NH) | 1,095 | 1,193 | 95.88% | 89.70% |
| Black or African American (NH) | 13 | 18 | 1.14% | 1.35% |
| Native American or Alaska Native (NH) | 1 | 0 | 0.09% | 0.00% |
| Asian (NH) | 2 | 19 | 0.18% | 1.43% |
| Pacific Islander or Native Hawaiian (NH) | 0 | 0 | 0.00% | 0.00% |
| Some other race (NH) | 0 | 1 | 0.00% | 0.08% |
| Two or more races/Multiracial (NH) | 4 | 44 | 0.35% | 3.31% |
| Hispanic or Latino (any race) | 27 | 55 | 2.36% | 4.14% |
| Total | 1,142 | 1,330 | | |

=== 2020 census ===
As of the 2020 census, Palm Beach Shores had a population of 1,330. The median age was 61.3 years. 5.6% of residents were under the age of 18 and 41.4% were 65 years of age or older. For every 100 females there were 91.1 males, and for every 100 females age 18 and over there were 90.3 males.

100.0% of residents lived in urban areas, while 0.0% lived in rural areas.

There were 782 households in Palm Beach Shores, of which 9.2% had children under the age of 18 living in them. Of all households, 37.6% were married-couple households, 26.5% were households with a male householder and no spouse or partner present, and 29.7% were households with a female householder and no spouse or partner present. About 44.2% of all households were made up of individuals, and 18.1% had someone living alone who was 65 years of age or older.

There were 1,279 housing units, of which 38.9% were vacant. The homeowner vacancy rate was 1.1% and the rental vacancy rate was 13.8%.

According to the 2020 American Community Survey 5-year estimates, there were 319 families residing in the town.

=== 2010 census ===
As of the 2010 United States census, there were 1,142 people, 521 households, and 225 families residing in the town.

=== 2000 census ===
As of the census of 2000, there were 1,269 people, 697 households, and 322 families residing in the town. The population density was 5,010.5 inhabitants per square mile (1,934.6/km^{2}). There were 1,171 housing units at an average density of 4,623.6 per square mile (1,785.2/km^{2}). The racial makeup of the town was 89.13% White (88% were Non-Hispanic White), 9.06% African American, 0.08% Native American, 0.47% Asian, 0.08% Pacific Islander, 0.39% from other races, and 0.79% from two or more races. Hispanic or Latino of any race were 2.13% of the population.

As of 2000, there were 697 households, out of which 8.2% had children under the age of 18 living with them, 39.7% were married couples living together, 4.3% had a female householder with no husband present, and 53.8% were non-families. 44.5% of all households were made up of individuals, and 18.7% had someone living alone who was 65 years of age or older. The average household size was 1.82 and the average family size was 2.52.

In 2000, in the town, the population was spread out, with 11.3% under the age of 18, 3.3% from 18 to 24, 23.7% from 25 to 44, 28.0% from 45 to 64, and 33.7% who were 65 years of age or older. The median age was 52 years. For every 100 females, there were 99.8 males. For every 100 females age 18 and over, there were 98.2 males.

In 2000, the median income for a household in the town was $47,262, and the median income for a family was $60,833. Males had a median income of $34,107 versus $31,944 for females. The per capita income for the town was $40,612. About 1.9% of families and 5.7% of the population were below the poverty line, including none of those under age 18 and 1.4% of those age 65 or over.

As of 2000, speakers of English as a first language accounted for 91.10% of all residents, while Spanish accounted for 5.61%, Russian made up 1.20%, French and Italian were at 0.86%, and German as a mother tongue was at 0.34% of the population.

As of 2000, Palm Beach Shores had the twentieth highest percentage of Canadian residents in the United States, making up 1.70% of the total population (which tied with Ocean Ridge, FL and 28 other areas in the US.)

== Education ==
Palm Beach Shores is served by the School District of Palm Beach County, but there are no public or private schools within the town.

== Notable people ==
- Arthur Octavius Edwards (1876–1960), founder and developer of Palm Beach Shores
- John D. MacArthur (1897–1978), insurance and real estate magnate and philanthropist
