= John D. MacArthur =

American businessman and philanthropist

- Born: John Donald MacArthur; March 6, 1897; Pittston, Pennsylvania, U.S.
- Died: January 6, 1978 (aged 80); West Palm Beach, Florida, U.S.
- Occupations: Businessman, philanthropist
- Known for: MacArthur Foundation
- Spouses: Louise Ingalls (div. 1937) Catherine T. Hyland (m. 1938)
- Children: 2, including J. Roderick MacArthur
- Relatives: John R. MacArthur (grandson); Charles MacArthur (brother); James MacArthur (nephew)

External image
- Photo of MacArthur

John Donald MacArthur (March 6, 1897 – January 6, 1978) was an American insurance magnate, real estate investor and philanthropist who established the John D. and Catherine T. MacArthur Foundation, benefactor in the MacArthur Fellowships.

== Early life ==
John Donald MacArthur was born on March 6, 1897, in Pittston, Pennsylvania, as the seventh child to Georginna and Reverend William Telfer MacArthur. He moved from Pittston to Chicago, Illinois, at the age of five. He and his many siblings grew up in poverty, the children of an itinerant Baptist preacher and his resourceful wife. His father went through many evangelical trainings, moving his family all around the country, from Chicago to Nyack, New York, to Springfield, Massachusetts. His sister-in-law was the actress Helen Hayes. His brother, American playwright and Academy Award winning screenwriter Charles MacArthur, co-authored the play The Front Page. John MacArthur dropped out of school after eighth grade and became a salesman.

== Career ==
=== World War I ===
MacArthur joined the U.S. Navy and then the Royal Canadian Air Force during World War I. He was medically discharged from service.

=== Insurance career ===
MacArthur made his fortune in the mail-order insurance business. He acquired the Bankers Life and Casualty Company, an insurance company defeated by the Great Depression, in 1935 after borrowing $2,500, then went on to build a business empire by acquiring many small insurance corporations. In the 1950s he signed famed broadcaster Paul Harvey as his company's radio spokesperson.

=== Real estate investments in Florida ===
MacArthur also increased his vast fortune by heavily and lucratively investing in Florida real estate. By the time of his death, he owned 100,000 acres of real estate in Florida. In 1954 for $5.5 million MacArthur bought 2,600 acres (11 km^{2}) of land in northern Palm Beach County originally owned by Harry Seymor Kelsey and later by Sir Harry Oakes. It included most of today's Lake Park, North Palm Beach, Palm Beach Gardens and Palm Beach Shores. For many years, MacArthur conducted his business affairs from a corner table in the Colonnades Beach Hotel coffee shop, in Singer Island in Palm Beach Shores, where he and his wife lived in an apartment above the bar, overlooking the Atlantic Ocean and the Lake Worth Lagoon.

== Personal life ==
MacArthur first married the former Louise Ingalls and had two children: a son, U.S. businessman and philanthropist J. Roderick (1920–1984); and a daughter, Virginia. The couple divorced in 1937. In 1938 MacArthur married his secretary, Catherine T. MacArthur (née Hyland), who for decades intimately involved herself in the management of his companies, and after whom his charitable foundation is co-named.

John R. MacArthur, the president of Harper's Magazine and son of J. Roderick MacArthur, is a grandson of John D. MacArthur.

== Death ==
On January 6, 1978, he died of pancreatic cancer at Good Samaritan Hospital in West Palm Beach, Florida.

== Legacy ==
=== John D. MacArthur Beach State Park ===
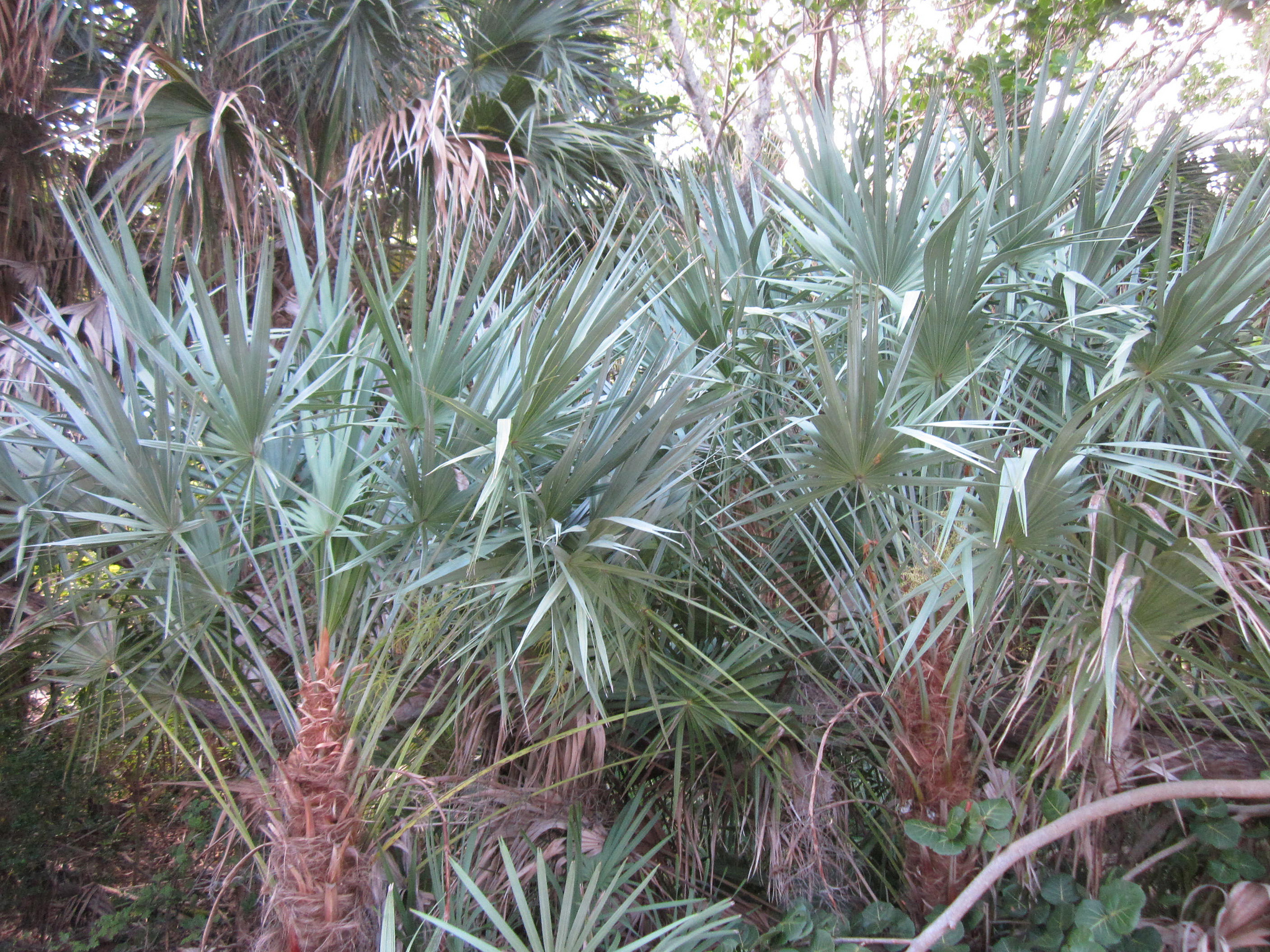
Palmettos at John D. MacArthur Beach State Park - Riviera Beach, Florida

John D. MacArthur Beach State Park in North Palm Beach, Florida, opened to the public in 1989.

=== John D. and Catherine T. MacArthur Foundation ===
John D. and Catherine T. MacArthur Foundation is one of the largest (when ranked by asset value) private foundations in the United States.

== Awards and honors ==
In 1977, MacArthur received the Golden Plate Award of the American Academy of Achievement. The award was presented to him by Awards Council member Helen Hayes.

== See also ==
- John D. MacArthur Beach State Park
