= Bankers Life =

American health insurance company

- Type: Subsidiary
- Industry: Insurance
- Founded: 1932; 94 years ago
- Headquarters: Chicago, Illinois, United States
- Products: Annuities; Health insurance Life insurance
- Parent: CNO Financial Group
- Website: www.bankerslife.com

The Bankers Life and Casualty Company, doing business as Bankers Life, is a private American health insurance company headquartered in Chicago, Illinois. Founded in 1932 as a mutual life insurance company, the company has been a subsidiary of CNO Financial Group since 1992. Bankers Life has 1.4 million policyholders across the United States and Canada, most of whom are within the company's target demographic of middle-aged and retirement-aged adults with annual household incomes between $25,000 and $75,000.

== Overview ==
The company's insurance products include life insurance, long-term care insurance, annuities, and Medicare products, including plans for Medicare Advantage and Medicare Part D prescription drug coverage. The company's in-house supplemental health insurance includes plans for critical illnesses and Medicare supplements, with vision and dental coverage sold through a partnership with Humana.

Bankers Life sells its policies through a network of over 5,000 insurance agents based in over 320 offices throughout the United States.

== History ==
=== Early years ===
The Bankers Life and Casualty Company was established in 1932 as a mutual life insurance company in Chicago, Illinois. In contrast to most other life insurance companies, whose costs included salaries for accountants, sales agents, officers, and actuaries, Bankers Life minimized its overhead as a means of undercutting the monthly insurance premiums of its competitors. By June 1935, however, corporate mismanagement rendered the company insolvent by $631.11 ($14,820 in 2025), resulting in the seizure of its assets for liquidation by the Illinois Insurance Department. On July 2, 1935, the company was sold to John D. MacArthur for $2,500 ($58,708 in 2025), who began running it from the office of his existing insurance company, Marquette Life.

Under MacArthur, the company employed its policy of minimal overhead to undercut the $10 ($234.83 in 2025) minimum monthly premiums of competitors with $1, $2, and $5 monthly premium policies. To sell more policies without hiring additional sales agents, the company began mailing its sales pitches to middle-income families, a demographic traditionally underserved by the insurance industry. By combining these methods with the mass-marketing and brand management techniques of large American manufacturers, the company grew from having $5,802 ($136,248 in 2025) in assets under management and $166,000 in life insurance policies in 1935 to $404,598 ($8.86 million in 2025) in assets under management and over $20 million in life insurance policies by 1941. Having outgrown the office of Marquette Life, Bankers Life moved to a four-story building in Mayfair that would serve as its headquarters for the following four decades.

By 1942 MacArthur sought to gain ownership of the company from its policyholders by converting it from a mutual insurance company to a joint-stock company. In September 1942 he established two shell companies, of which one, the Illinois Standard Life Insurance Company, would serve as the new company. In December he merged Bankers Life, the second shell company, and the Hotel Men's Mutual Benefit Association—another life insurance company acquired by MacArthur—into Illinois Standard Life to form the West Side Assessment Life Insurance Company, which was subsequently renamed the Bankers Life and Casualty Company. While the Hotel Men's Mutual Benefit Association did not bring many new policyholders to Bankers Life, the Illinois Insurance code allowed the new company to assume the former's founding date of January 17, 1879, as its own. Now the president and sole shareholder of Bankers Life, MacArthur expanded the company's marketing efforts with a $105,000 magazine advertising contract. Despite the new Bankers Life being largely identical to its former iteration, advertisements promoting it often made use of Hotel Men's 1879 founding date via claims such as "Chicago’s First Insurance Company—Established 1879".

=== Expansion ===
Between 1943 and 1946 the company opened branch offices in Florida, Michigan, Missouri, and West Virginia, the success of which enabled it to expand its operations across 14 states by 1951. The company's rapid expansion was fueled by a staff that included sales agents, claims adjusters, billing processors, and addressograph operators, with the staff at its headquarters growing from 50 employees in 1940 to over 2,000 by 1955. Bankers Life diversified its business by marketing health insurance policies under its White Cross brand, becoming one of the largest health and accident insurance companies in the United States by 1956. The establishment of Medicare in July 1965 led Bankers Life and other health insurance companies to develop and market Medicare supplement policies to pay for costs not covered under the new program.

In early 1970 a life-threatening bout of stomach cancer gave MacArthur concern about the potential impact of estate taxes on his fortune. On October 18, 1970, he established the MacArthur Foundation, a private foundation that would inherit the majority of his estate after his death and put it to use in support of charitable causes. While this included his position as sole shareholder of Bankers Life, the Tax Reform Act of 1969 would require the foundation to eventually divest it. In October 1974 MacArthur resigned as president of Bankers Life, naming Robert Ewing as his successor.

By 1977 the company had become the second largest health and accident insurance company in the United States, with a workforce of nearly 4,000 employees across 47 states (excluding California, New Jersey, and New York), Washington, D.C., and the Canadian provinces of Ontario and Quebec. Its yearly net income had grown to $22 million ($124 million in 2025) by 1976, with $1.04 billion ($5.53 billion in 2025) of assets under management by the end of 1977.

=== Post-MacArthur ===
Upon MacArthur's death in 1978 his shares in Bankers Life, worth over $415 million ($2.35 billion in 2025), passed to the MacArthur Foundation. On October 30, 1984, the foundation sold Bankers Life for $382 million to the Texas-based Great Southern Life Insurance Company, a subsidiary of the Louisville, Kentucky based I.C.H. Corporation, an insurance industry holding company. On November 9, 1992, I.C.H. Corporation sold Bankers Life for $600 million to Conseco, a Carmel, Indiana based insurance industry holding company, known as CNO Financial Group since 2010. In 1993 Bankers Life moved its headquarters into the Merchandise Mart building in downtown Chicago. On January 1, 2000, Conseco merged another of its insurance industry subsidiaries, Certified Life Insurance Company, into Bankers Life.

In 2012, Bankers Life processed about 8.5 million claims and paid out $1.3 billion in policy benefits. In 2015, Bankers Life had $19 billion in assets under management.

== Sponsorships ==
Bankers Life is a national sponsor of the Alzheimer's Association, organizing annual fundraising campaigns since 2003 to raise public awareness of the disease. As of 22 August 2023, its campaigns have helped raise over $7 million in support of the Alzheimer's Association's care, education, and research programs.

In 2011 CNO Financial Group transferred the naming rights to the home arena of the Indiana Pacers NBA team to Bankers Life, renaming it from Conseco Fieldhouse to Bankers Life Fieldhouse. In March 2018 CNO opted not to renew its naming sponsorship of Bankers Life Fieldhouse, which expired on June 30, 2019. On September 27, 2021, it was renamed Gainbridge Fieldhouse, with the financial platform Gainbridge becoming its new naming partner.
