= MacArthur Foundation =

American private foundation

The John D. and Catherine T. MacArthur Foundation
- Founded: 1970; 56 years ago
- Type: 501(c)(3) organization
- Tax ID no.: 23-7093598
- Purpose: Climate change, nuclear challenges, non-profit journalism, local issues in Chicago
- Location: Marquette Building, Chicago, Illinois, U.S.
- President: John Palfrey
- Key people: John D. MacArthur (co-founder); Catherine T. MacArthur (co-founder)
- Endowment: $9.2 billion (2024)
- Website: www.macfound.org

The John D. and Catherine T. MacArthur Foundation is an American private foundation that makes grants and impact investments to support non-profit organizations in approximately 117 countries around the world. As of 2025, the MacArthur Foundation has an endowment of $9 billion and provides hundreds of millions of dollars annually in grants and impact investments. Based in Chicago, Illinois, it is one of the 20 largest private foundations in the United States. The foundation has awarded billions of dollars in grants since its first round of giving in 1978.

The foundation's stated purpose is to support "creative people, effective institutions, and influential networks building a more just, verdant, and peaceful world". MacArthur's grant-making priorities include mitigating climate change, reducing jail populations, decreasing nuclear threats, supporting nonprofit journalism, and funding local needs in its hometown of Chicago. According to the OECD, the foundation's financing for 2019 development increased by 27% to US$109 million. The MacArthur Fellows Program, commonly referred to as the "genius" award, (Note: The MacArthur Foundation does not use the term "genius" to describe its fellows and has asked the media to stop using it.) annually gives $800,000 no-strings-attached grants to around two dozen creative individuals in diverse fields "who have shown extraordinary originality and dedication in their creative pursuits". The foundation's 100&Change competition awards a $100 million grant every three years to a single proposal.

== History ==
John D. MacArthur owned Bankers Life and Casualty and other businesses, as well as considerable property holdings in Florida and New York. His wife, Catherine, held positions in many of these companies. Their attorney, William T. Kirby, and Paul Doolen, their chief financial officer, suggested that the family create a foundation to be endowed by their vast fortune.

When MacArthur died on January 6, 1978, he was worth in excess of a billion dollars. He left 92 percent of his estate to found the John D. and Catherine T. MacArthur Foundation. Its first board of directors, per MacArthur's will, also included J. Roderick MacArthur, John's son from his first marriage, two other officers of Bankers Life and Casualty, and radio commentator Paul Harvey. Jonas Salk, the inventor of the polio vaccine, later joined the board of directors.

The elder MacArthur believed in the free market. However, he did not direct how foundation money was to be spent after he died. MacArthur told the board of directors, "I figured out how to make the money. You fellows will have to figure out how to spend it."

Between 1979 and 1981, John's son, an ideological opponent of his father with whom the elder MacArthur had an acrimonious relationship, waged a legal battle against the foundation for control of the board of directors. The younger MacArthur sued eight members of the board, accusing them of mismanagement of the foundation funds. These court cases were dismissed by each jurisdiction for lack of merit.

In 1984, MacArthur again sued the board of directors including William Kirby, his father's trusted attorney, asking a Cook County circuit court to liquidate the entire MacArthur Foundation. He dropped the suit later that year when he was diagnosed with pancreatic cancer.

In March 2025, the foundation announced plans to increase its giving to at least six percent of its endowment in response to the Trump administration's efforts to cut federal funding and programs. Citing that grantees receive 12 percent of their funding from government grants, MacArthur Foundation president John Palfrey said, "Our goal is to lessen negative impacts and risks of the current, man-made emergency and to help our grantees deliver on their mission."

== Leadership ==
John E. Corbally, the first president of the foundation and later board chairman from 1995 to 2002, was followed in 1989–99 by Adele Simmons, who was the first female dean at Princeton University. Jonathan Fanton, president of American Academy of Arts and Sciences, served as the foundation's next president. Robert Gallucci, formerly dean of Georgetown University's School of Foreign Service, served as the foundation's fourth president from 2009 to 2014. Gallucci was fired in 2014. Julia Stasch, who formerly served as MacArthur's vice president for U.S. Programs, was named the foundation's president in 2015. Stasch had been chief of staff to Chicago mayor Richard M. Daley. She announced that she would step down in 2019. In March 2019, educator and law professor John Palfrey was named president, effective September 1, 2019.

== MacArthur Fellowship ==
The MacArthur Fellowship is an award issued by the MacArthur Foundation each year, to typically 20 to 30 citizens or residents of the United States, of any age and working in any field, who "show exceptional merit and promise for continued and enhanced creative work". The program was initiated in 1981. According to the foundation, the fellowship is not a reward for past accomplishment, but an investment in a person's originality and potential. As of 2015, MacArthur Fellows receive $625,000 each, which is paid out in quarterly installments over five years. No one can apply for the program, and, generally, no one knows whether they are being considered as a candidate. Nominators, serving confidentially, anonymously and for a limited time, are invited to recommend potential Fellows. Candidates are reviewed by a selection committee whose members also serve confidentially, anonymously and for a limited time. Ultimately, the selection committee makes recommendations to the foundation's board of directors for final approval.

== Specific funding and projects ==
=== Stalker Human Rights Film Festival ===
The foundation awarded a total of around $850,000 in six separate grants to the Russian Guild of Film Directors between 2005 and 2014 to support the Stalker Human Rights Film Festival in Moscow.

=== 100&Change ===
In June 2016, the foundation requested "proposals promising real progress toward solving a critical problem of our time in any field or any location". The winning proposal would receive a $100 million grant. Almost 2,000 proposals were submitted. In December 2017, the foundation announced that the winning proposal was submitted by the Sesame Workshop and the International Rescue Committee. The grant was applied to the education of Middle Eastern refugee children.

=== The Just Home Project ===
In May 2022, The MacArthur Foundation, partnered with the Urban Institute announced the launch of a housing stability program designed to break the links between housing instability and jail incarceration. The Just Home Project will provide the communities of Charleston County, South Carolina; Minnehaha County, South Dakota; the city and county of San Francisco; and Tulsa County, Oklahoma with $5 million in grant funding to create a unique plan to bring together government officials, non-profit partners, and impacted communities members to develop innovative approaches to this issue. MacArthur has awarded $3.2 million in support of the work in the selected communities and an additional $1.8 million will support the Urban Institute's technical assistance work.

== See also ==
- List of wealthiest charitable foundations
