= Catspaw (Star Trek: The Original Series) =

- Star Trek: The Original Series episode
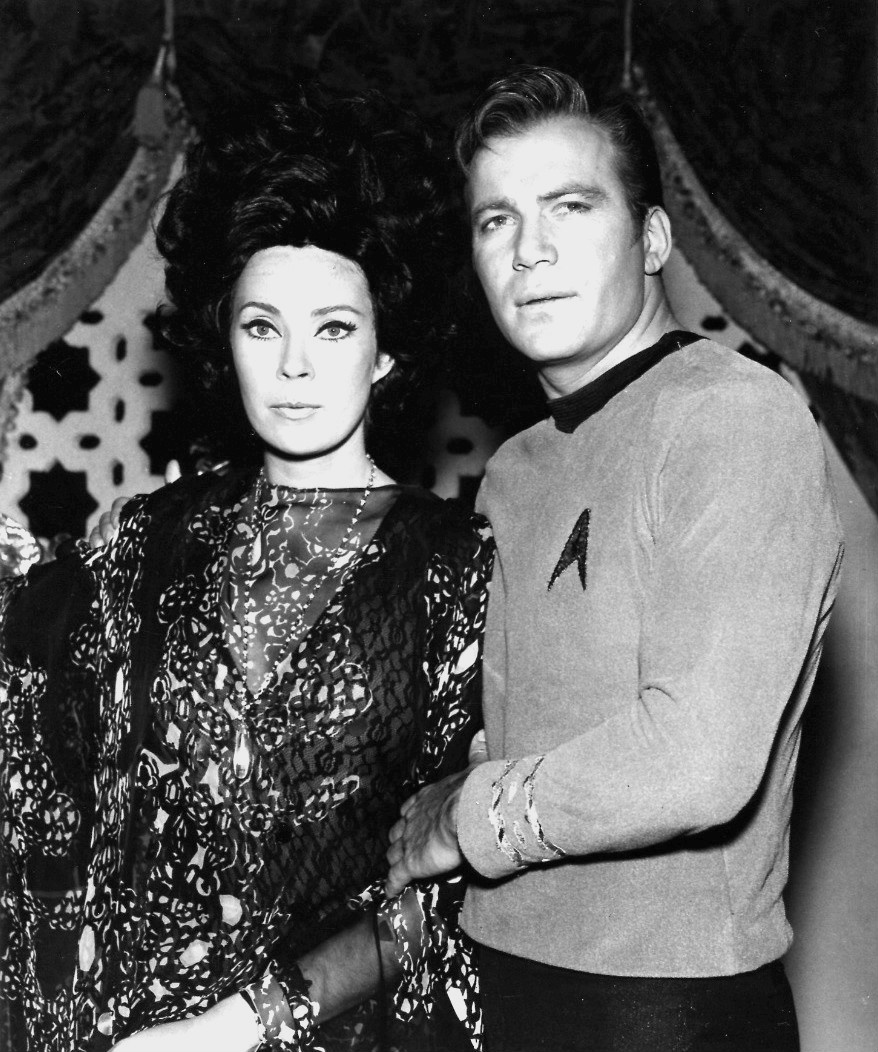
- Episode no.: Season 2 Episode 7
- Directed by: Joseph Pevney
- Written by: Robert Bloch
- Cinematography by: Jerry Finnerman
- Production code: 030
- Original air date: October 27, 1967

Guest appearances
- Antoinette Bower – Sylvia; Theo Marcuse – Korob; Michael Barrier – Asst. Chief Engineer DeSalle; Eddie Paskey – Lt. Leslie; William Blackburn – Lt. Hadley; Jimmy Jones – Crewman Jackson; Rhodie Cogan – First Witch; Gail Bonney – Second Witch; Maryesther Denver – Third Witch; John Winston – Lt. Kyle

Episode chronology
← Previous "The Doomsday Machine"	Next → "I, Mudd"
- Star Trek: The Original Series season 2

"Catspaw" is the seventh episode of the second season of the American science fiction television series Star Trek written by Robert Bloch and directed by Joseph Pevney, it was first broadcast October 27, 1967. The episode features Antoinette Bower, Theo Marcuse, and Michael Barrier as guest stars.

The crew of the Enterprise encounter two aliens from another galaxy with magical-seeming powers. This episode was the first filmed to include series regular Pavel Chekov (Walter Koenig), although it was broadcast after several other episodes with the character having already been aired; the airing was delayed to coincide with Halloween.

== Plot ==
The USS Enterprise, under the command of Captain Kirk, orbits the apparently lifeless planet Pyris VII. Contact has been lost with the landing party, consisting of Chief Engineer Scott, Lt. Sulu, and Crewman Jackson. Jackson calls for transport back to the ship, but falls from the platform dead. His open mouth emits an eerie voice, telling Captain Kirk that Enterprise is cursed and must leave the planet immediately, or death will follow.

Kirk beams down with First Officer Spock and Chief Medical Officer Dr. McCoy to search for the missing crewmen, leaving Assistant Chief Engineer DeSalle in charge of Enterprise. The landing party comes upon three apparitions that appear as witches, who warn the landing team not to proceed any further. The team ignores the warnings and discovers what appears to be a medieval castle.

Entering the castle, the landing party comes upon a black cat wearing a diamond pendant. As they follow the cat, the floor collapses, and the fall knocks them unconscious. When they awaken, they find themselves held in a dungeon. Scott and Sulu soon appear, walking as if in a trance, and unlock their restraints.

Kirk and the others attempt to overpower them but suddenly find themselves in another part of the castle, with a robed man, Korob, and the black cat, whom he appears to consult for advice. Spock remarks that no life is known to exist on the planet, and Korob admits that he is not a native. The cat leaves the room, and Korob's beautiful colleague Sylvia enters, wearing a pendant identical to the cat's. As a demonstration of her power, by which she claims to have killed Jackson, Sylvia dangles a miniature model of Enterprise over a lit candle, after which the crew of the real Enterprise reports a rapid rise in hull temperature.

Kirk reluctantly surrenders and offers to cooperate. Korob then surrounds the model of the ship with a crystal prism, informing them that Enterprise has been encased in an impenetrable force field. Kirk and Spock are then led back to the dungeon.

After a while McCoy appears, in a trance, and leads Kirk back to Sylvia. Sylvia wants to experience human sensations, and appears in various feminine forms to stimulate Kirk's interest. Kirk plays along as he tries to get information. Sylvia tells Kirk that she and Korob are explorers from another galaxy, who wield their power through a device called a transmuter, which gives them control over matter. Sylvia then realizes Kirk is using her, and angrily sends him back to the dungeon. Korob comes to free Kirk and Spock, telling them that he has released their ship, and urges them to leave immediately, as he can no longer keep Sylvia under control. Sylvia, in the form of a giant cat, attacks him. Korob releases his scepter and Kirk picks it up, guessing it to be the transmuter.

Kirk tells Sylvia that he has the transmuter. He destroys it when she threatens him with a phaser. The castle disappears and Sulu, Scotty, and McCoy return to normal. Looking down, Kirk sees two tiny blue and yellow creatures, apparently Korob's and Sylvia's true forms. Unable to survive without the transmuter, the two creatures die and disintegrate.

== Production ==
Catspaw was the first episode produced in season 2. Bloch wrote this episode, basing it on his short story, "Broomstick Ride" (1957). He also wrote the Star Trek episode, "What Are Little Girls Made Of?" Both mention the "Old Ones". The character of Asst. Chief Engineer DeSalle previously appeared in the episodes, "The Squire of Gothos" and "This Side of Paradise" wearing a gold command shirt.

The cloak worn by Gilligan in the episode "Lovey's Secret Admirer" of the series Gilligan's Island (aired January 23, 1967) was also worn by Korob in "Catspaw" (October 27, 1967).

Catspaw was the first episode known for the United Federation of Planets not using money.

=== Music ===
Star Trek had five musicians employed: Alexander Courage, Jerry Fielding, Gerald Fried, Sol Kaplan, and Fred Steiner. Courage wrote the main title theme and the cue Ship in Orbit, a tranquil version of the title theme. Fifty-one cues were made during 1968 to 1969.

== Reception ==
=== Critical response ===
In 2017, Heroes & Icons included "Catspaw" in a list of "eerie, disturbing and downright scary" episodes of the series. The list noted that the episode was written by Robert Bloch, writer of the famous psychological thriller Psycho.

In 2020, Den of Geek ranked "Catspaw" as the 28th scariest episode of all Star Trek franchise television episodes, including later television series.

In 2021, ScreenRant ranked "Catspaw" the 10th scariest episode of all Star Trek franchise television episodes, including later series.

In 2024 Deadline Hollywood ranked Catspaw at number 50 out of the 79 original series episodes, calling it "stylish and silly"

=== Release ===
Catspaw was released on VHS on April 15, 1994, by CBS Paramount International Television.

== See also ==
- The Monkey and the Cat, the source of the idiom "catspaw"
