= Edith Atwater =

American actress (1911–1986)

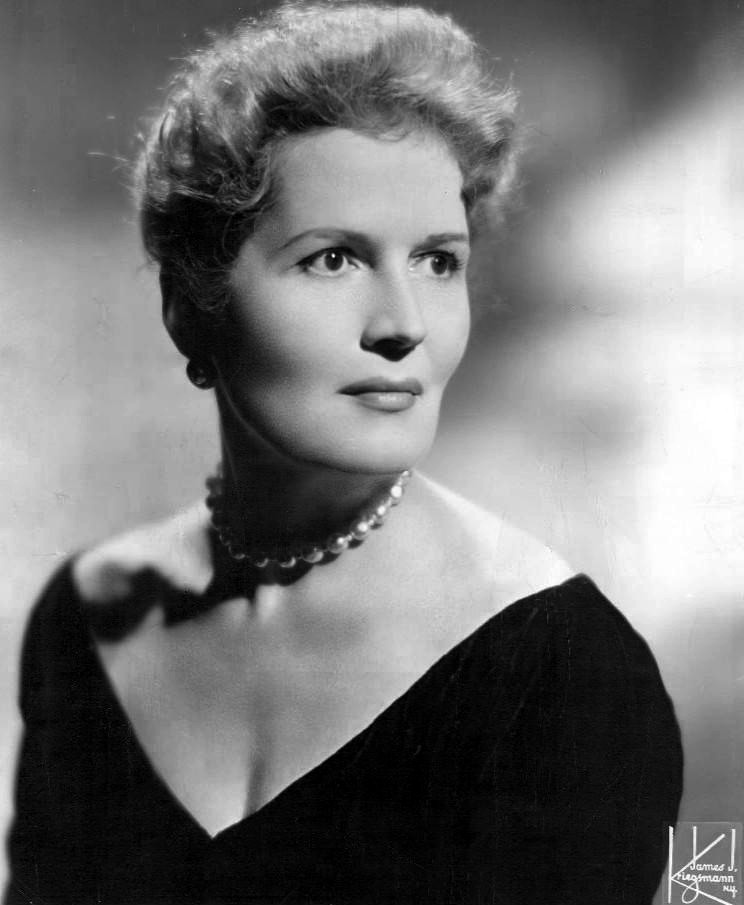
- Atwater in 1961
- Born: April 22, 1911; Chicago, Illinois, U.S.
- Died: March 14, 1986 (aged 74); Los Angeles, California, U.S.
- Occupation: Actress
- Years active: 1936–1985
- Spouses: Hugh Marlowe (m. 1941; div. 1946) Joseph Allen (m. 1951; div. 1953) Kent Smith (m. 1962; died 1985)

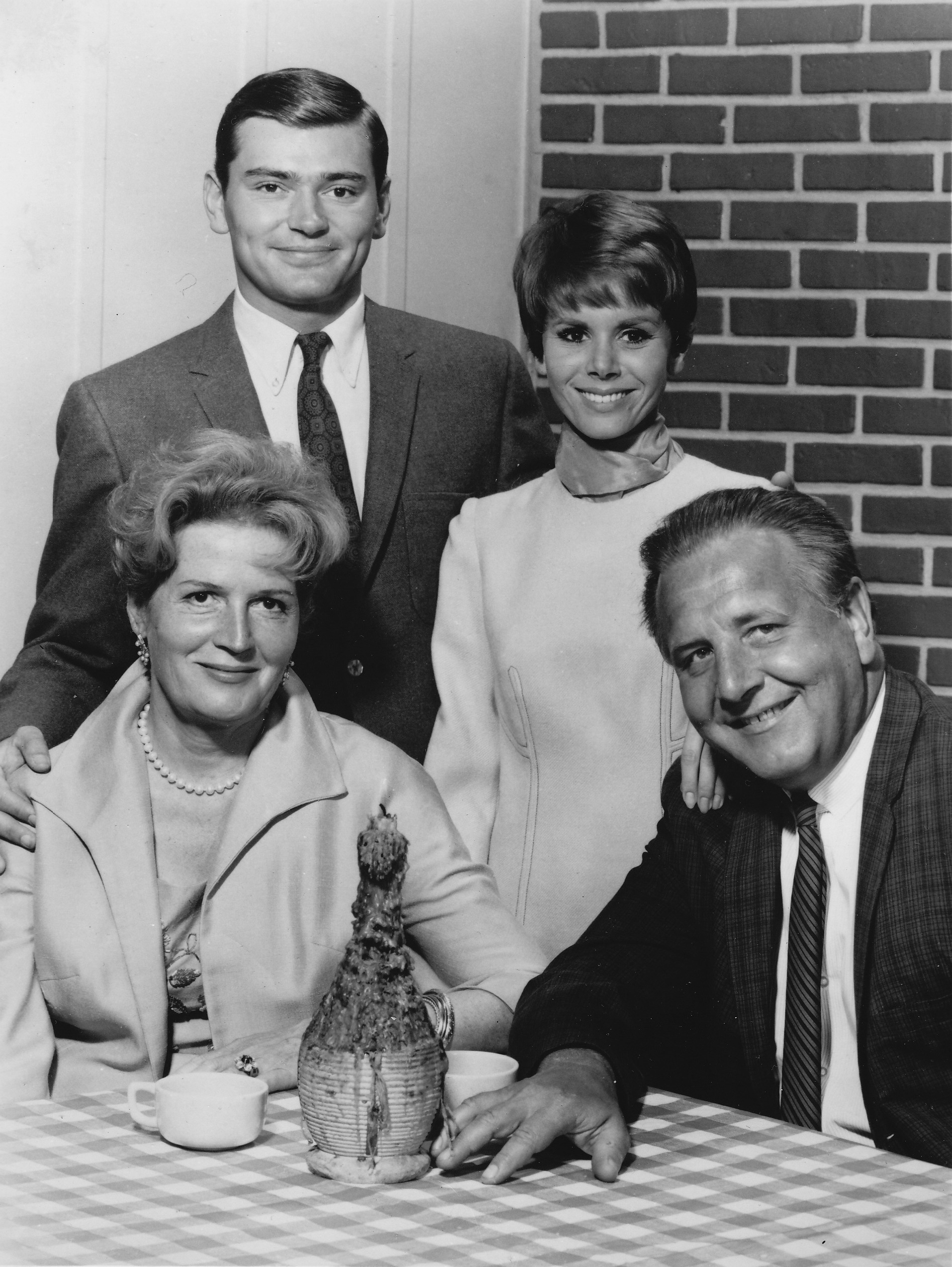
From TV's Love on a Rooftop: Back row, L-R: Pete Duel, Judy Carne Front: Edith Atwater, Herbert Voland (1966)

Edith Atwater (April 22, 1911 – March 14, 1986) was an American stage, film, and television actress.

== Early years ==
Atwater was born on April 22, 1911, in Chicago. She attended the Faulkner School in Chicago and the Holmquist boarding school in New Hope, Pennsylvania, participating in school plays at the latter. She gained a year of additional study at the American Academy of Dramatic Arts. She was trained at the American Laboratory Theatre, after which she debuted when she was 18 years old.

== Career ==
Atwater performed for a year with the Goodman Theatre in Chicago and acted with other stock theater companies before she appeared on Broadway. She made her Broadway debut in 1931 in Springtime for Henry. In 1939, she starred in The Man Who Came to Dinner.

Her film career included roles in The Body Snatcher (1945), Sweet Smell of Success (1957), It Happened at the World's Fair (1963), Strait-Jacket (1964), Strange Bedfellows (1965), True Grit (1969), The Love Machine (1971), Die Sister, Die! (1972), Mackintosh and T.J. (1975), and Family Plot (1976).

From 1964 to 1965, Atwater appeared in several episodes of the television series Peyton Place in the role of Grace Morton, wife of Dr. Robert Morton, who was played by her real-life husband Kent Smith. During the 1966–1967 television season, she appeared in the series Love on a Rooftop. She was also a regular on the television series Kaz during the 1978–1979 season. Her other television work included appearances on The Rockford Files, Hazel, Knots Landing, and numerous other series.

Atwater's work on Broadway included performances in Flahooley (1951), King Lear (1950), Metropole (1949), The Gentleman From Athens (1947), Parlor Story (1947), State of the Union (1945), R.U.R. (1942), Broken Journey (1942), Johnny on a Spot (1942), Retreat to Pleasure (1940), The Man Who Came to Dinner (1939), Susan and God (1937), The Masque of Kings (1937), The Country Wife (1936), This Our House (1935), Brittle Heaven (1934), Are You Decent (1934), and Springtime for Henry (1931).

Atwater was a member of the governing board of Actors' Equity Association.

== Personal life and death ==
On November 15, 1941, in New York, Atwater married actor Hugh Marlowe; they divorced in 1946. She married Joseph Allen in 1951, and they were divorced in 1953. She was married to actor Kent Smith from 1962 until his death in 1985. She died of cancer in 1986 at Cedars-Sinai Medical Center at age 74. She had no children.

== Legacy ==
Atwater's likeness was drawn in caricature by Alex Gard for Sardi's, the theatre-district restaurant in New York City. The picture is now part of the collection of the New York Public Library.

== Filmography ==
Film
Year	Title	Role	Notes
1936	We Went to College	Nina	Alternate title: The Old School Tie
1936	The Gorgeous Hussy	Lady Vaughn	Uncredited
1945	The Body Snatcher	Meg Cameron	
1949	C-Man	Lydia Brundage	
1951	Teresa	Mrs. Lawrence	Uncredited
1957	Sweet Smell of Success	Mary	
1961	Mr. Sardonicus	Nurse	Uncredited
1962	Sweet Bird of Youth	Minor Role	Uncredited
1963	It Happened at the World's Fair	Miss Steuben	
1964	Strait-Jacket	Mrs. Alison Fields	
1965	Strange Bedfellows	Mrs. Stevens	
1969	Daddy's Gone A-Hunting	Hospital Desk Nurse	Uncredited
1969	True Grit	Mrs. Floyd	
1970	Pieces of Dreams	Mrs. Lind (Gregory's Mother)	
1970	Norwood	Angry Bus Passenger	
1971	The Love Machine	Mary	
1972	Call Me by My Rightful Name	Mrs. Watkins	
1972	Stand Up and Be Counted	Sophie	
1974	Our Time	Mrs. Margaret Pendleton	
1975	Mackintosh and T.J.	Mrs. Webster	
1976	Family Plot	Mrs. Clay	
1978	Mean Dog Blues	Linda's Mother	
1978	Die Sister, Die!	Amanda Price	
Television
Year	Title	Role	Notes
1948	The Philco Television Playhouse	Marian Burnett	Episode: "Parlor Story"
1949	NBC Presents		Episode: "Concerning a Lady's Honor"
1950	Suspense	Louise Lord	Episode: "The Man Who Talked in His Sleep"
1951	Somerset Maugham TV Theatre		Episode: "The Outstation"
1955	Armstrong Circle Theatre		Episode: "The Honorable Mrs. Jones"
1958	Decoy	Lily Conway Flagler	Episode: "High Swing"
1960	The Witness		Episode: "Police Lt. Charles Becker"
1961	Festival	Mrs. Moreen	Episode: "The Pupil"
1962	Stoney Burke	Ruth Coles	Episode: "A Matter of Pride"
1962	The Eleventh Hour	Ann Tabor	2 episodes
1964	Dr. Kildare	Miss Thorton	Episode: "A Day to Remember"
1964–65	Peyton Place	Grace Morton	11 episodes
1965	The Alfred Hitchcock Hour	Mrs. Brenner	Episode: "Thou Still Unravished Bride"
1965	Profiles in Courage	Mrs. Andrews	Episode: "Judge Benjamin Barr Lindsey"
1965	Hazel	Edith Stoneham	Episode: "Do Not Disturb Occupants"
1965	The Legend of Jesse James	Sarah Todd	Episode: "One Too Many Mornings"
1966–67	Love on a Rooftop	Phyllis Hammond	15 episodes
1967	Judd, for the Defense	Mrs. Buckley	Episode: "To Love and Stand Mute"
1969	Ironside	Miss Bryan	Episode: "Up, Down and Even"
1969	Walt Disney's Wonderful World of Color	Mrs. Addy Mason	Episodes: "Ride a Northbound Horse" (Parts 1 & 2)
1969	The Flying Nun	Mother General	Episode: "The New Habit"
1970	Nanny and the Professor	Miss Dunbar	Episode: "Nanny Will Do"
1970	Bonanza	Roberta	Episodes: "The Night Virginia City Died", "The Weary Willies"
1973	Room 222	Mrs. Travis	Episode: "Can Nun Be One Too Many?"
1974	Doc Elliot	Emma Johnson	Episode: "The Gold Mine"
1975	The Rockford Files	Kate Banning	Episode: "The Four Pound Brick"
1975	Insight	Alice Jeffries	Episode: "The Pendulum"
1976	Switch	Mrs. Wood	Episode: "Round Up the Usual Suspects"
1976	Family	Judge Harmon	Episode: "Coming Apart"
1976	Baretta	Mrs. Youngstein	Episode: "Dear Tony"
1977	The Hardy Boys/Nancy Drew Mysteries	Aunt Gertrude Hardy	7 episodes
1978–79	Kaz	Illsa Fogel	22 episodes
1981	CBS Afternoon Playhouse	Mrs. Rutherford	Episode: "The Great Gilly Hopkins"
1982	Knots Landing	Dr. Lillian McCary	Episode: "The Best Kept Secret"
1983	Hart to Hart	Dr. Jane Barrett	Episodes: "Pounding Harts", "Harts on the Scent"
1985	Family Ties	Gertrude "Aunt Trudy" Harris	Episode: "Auntie Up"

== See also ==
- List of caricatures at Sardi's restaurant

== Sources ==
- "Edith Atwater Is Dead at 74; Actress in Theater and Film". The New York Times. March 17, 1986.
