= Zelda Popkin =

American novelist and mystery author (1898–1983)

- Born: Jennie Feinberg; July 5, 1898; Brooklyn, New York, U.S.
- Died: May 25, 1983 (aged 84); Silver Spring, Maryland, U.S.
- Occupations: Novelist, mystery writer, journalist, public relations executive
- Notable work: Death Wears a White Gardenia; The Journey Home; Small Victory; Quiet Street
- Spouse: Louis Popkin
- Children: 2, including Richard Popkin

Zelda Popkin (née Feinberg; 5 July 1898 – 25 May 1983) was an American novelist, mystery writer, journalist, and public relations executive. She wrote fourteen books, including five mystery novels featuring department-store detective Mary Carner. Her other novels included The Journey Home (1945), Small Victory (1947), Quiet Street (1951), and A Death of Innocence (1971).

Popkin's fiction included detective novels, works about Jewish American life, and novels dealing with the aftermath of World War II and the Holocaust. Her 1951 novel Quiet Street, about the 1948 Arab–Israeli War, received a Jewish National Book Award.

== Early life and education ==
Zelda Popkin (born Jennie Feinberg in 1898) was the daughter of Lithuanian Jewish immigrants. She was born in Brooklyn and grew up in Plainfield, New Jersey and Wilkes-Barre, Pennsylvania, where her father operated a series of unsuccessful small businesses. Like many American-born children of East European Jews, she left her parents’ religious orthodoxy, which she later dismissed as "medieval dogmas," and sought full integration into American society. She adopted the name Zelda. At age sixteen, she graduated from Wilkes-Barre High School and became the first woman reporter hired by the Wilkes-Barre Times-Leader. Two years later, she moved to New York City, where she would live for the rest of her life. While rejected by the Columbia University School of Journalism and by Barnard College, she did take some classes at Columbia's Extension program.

== Career ==
In New York, Popkin met and married Louis Popkin, himself an American-born child of East European Jewish immigrants and an active Zionist. Their wedding took place at the Broadway Central Hotel in October 1919, performed by Rabbi Joseph Silverman. Both Zelda and Louis wrote articles for the American Hebrew as well as the American Israelite, and later both also worked for the American Jewish Joint Distribution Committee (JDC). After World War I the couple founded one of the United States’ first independent public-relations firms, the Planned Publicity Company. Throughout the 1920s and 1930s, the Popkins represented political candidates from both major parties, supported Spanish Loyalist causes, and assisted Jewish communal initiatives, including fundraising efforts for the Hebrew University in Jerusalem.

Popkin wrote press releases and magazine articles and placed stories in publications including The New Yorker and The New York Times. The couple even succeeded in circulating a fabricated story about a group called “the Shifters,” which fooled major newspapers, including the Times, when it resurfaced decades later.

During the 1930s, Popkin and her husband participated in anti-Nazi rallies, refugee sponsorship efforts, and campaigns opposing Charles Coughlin.

After Louis Popkin's sudden death in 1943, Popkin closed their public-relations firm and returned to work for the JDC, where she assisted in efforts to rescue the remaining Jews of Europe. A memorandum she drafted that year emphasized the need to focus on survivors who might form the basis of a rebuilt European Jewry.

Popkin began publishing fiction in the late 1930s, writing six detective novels between 1938 and 1945, five of which featured Mary Carner, a department-store detective later recognized by critics as one of the earliest fully independent female sleuths in American mystery fiction.

Her 1945 novel The Journey Home was based in part on a wartime train accident Popkin had experienced. It became a bestseller, appearing shortly after V-J Day and selling nearly a million copies. She later secured an assignment from the American Red Cross to travel to Europe and report on relief work in the devastated cities and displaced persons (DP) camps.

During the winter of 1945–46, Popkin visited bombed-out cities in Germany and Austria, traveled extensively under difficult conditions, and observed Jewish survivors living in Displaced Persons (DP) camps. Historian Jeremy Popkin has argued that her letters from this period show changes in her understanding of Jewish survivors and also record critical judgments about some of them.

Popkin's experiences in Europe formed the basis of her 1947 novel Small Victory, one of the earliest American fictional treatments of the human consequences of the Holocaust. Although Jewish survivors appear only peripherally in the story, the novel condemned what Popkin viewed as indifference or hostility within American occupation policy toward Jews. Jeremy Popkin has written that the novel portrayed survivors through stereotypes common in the immediate postwar period. Contemporary reviews of the novel were mixed.

Her next novel, Walk Through the Valley (1949) explored midlife widowhood, while her 1951 novel Quiet Street, the first American novel about the 1948 Arab–Israeli War, was based on several months she spent in Israel visiting her sister, a journalist for the Palestine Post. Quiet Street sold poorly. Popkin later wrote that its reception led her to believe that "Jewish books do not sell."

Popkin published her autobiography, Open Every Door, in 1956. In it, she chronicled her childhood, life with her husband, life after his death, and her postwar experiences.

Another book written later in her career, Herman Had Two Daughters (1968), which is a novel about two young Jewish women growing up in a small Pennsylvania town, is also largely autobiographical.

Popkin continued writing and spent several years working on an unpublished novel about the Molly Maguires. In 1965, she held a residency at the Yaddo writers’ colony, where she interacted with Alfred Kazin, Philip Roth and Saul Bellow.

Popkin's 1971 novel A Death of Innocence was made into a television movie of the same name.

== Personal life and death ==
Zelda Popkin was married to Louis Popkin, and together they ran a small public relations firm until his death in 1943. They had two children, Roy and Richard. She died on May 25, 1983.

== Awards ==
- 1952 Jewish National Book Award for Quiet Street

== Selected Publications ==
=== Mary Carner Crime Series ===
- Death Wears a White Gardenia (1938)
- Time Off for Murder (1940)
- Murder in the Mist (1940)
- Dead Man's Gift (1941)
- No Crime for a Lady (1942)

=== Novels ===
- So Much Blood (1944)
- The Journey Home (1945)
- Small Victory (1947)
- Walk Through the Valley (1949)
- Quiet Street (1951)
- Herman Had Two Daughters (1968)
- A Death of Innocence (1971)
- Dear Once (1975)

=== Non fiction autobiography ===
- Open Every Door (1956)

== Collections ==
Popkin's professional archives are preserved at the Howard Gotlieb Archival Research Center at Boston University. Much of her personal correspondence is retained by the Popkin family.
