= Die Sister, Die! =

1978 film

- Directed by: Randall Hood
- Screenplay by: Tony Sawyer
- Story by: William Hersey
- Produced by: Geoffrey Beaumont (executive producer); Randall Hood (producer)
- Starring: Jack Ging; Edith Atwater; Antoinette Bower; Kent Smith; Robert Emhardt
- Cinematography: Michael Lonzo
- Music by: Hugo Friedhofer
- Production company: Project Blue
- Distributed by: Cinema Shares International
- Release date: December 1978
- Running time: 82 minutes (American video version)
- Country: United States
- Language: English

Die Sister, Die! (also known as The Companion) is a 1978 American thriller film directed by Randall Hood and written by Tony Sawyer starring Jack Ging, Edith Atwater, Antoinette Bower, and Kent Smith.

== Plot ==
Edward (Jack Ging) is tired of the "allowance" granted him by his sister Amanda (Edith Atwater) and becomes impatient for her death and his inheritance. To hasten her demise, or at least stop her suicides from being thwarted, Edward hires Esther (Antoinette Bower), a discredited ex-nurse, to watch over her. Esther is less than enthusiastic about killing the old woman, and curious about the secrets held in the house, including a mysterious third sister, Nell.

== Cast ==
- Jack Ging as Edward
- Edith Atwater as Amanda
- Antoinette Bower as Esther
- Kent Smith as Dr. Thorne
- Robert Emhardt as Father
- Rita Conde as Mrs. Gonzalez
- Peg Shirley as Nell

== Soundtrack ==
The film's score was composed by Hugo Friedhofer, and performed by the National Philharmonic Orchestra conducted by Carl Brandt. It was Friedhofer's final movie work. In 2014 Intrada Records released a limited edition album of the complete score.

== Remake ==
The film was remade in 2013 by director, writer and producer Dustin Ferguson, starring Brinke Stevens as Amanda Price.

== See also ==
- List of American films of 1978
