= This Side of Paradise (Star Trek: The Original Series) =

- Star Trek: The Original Series episode
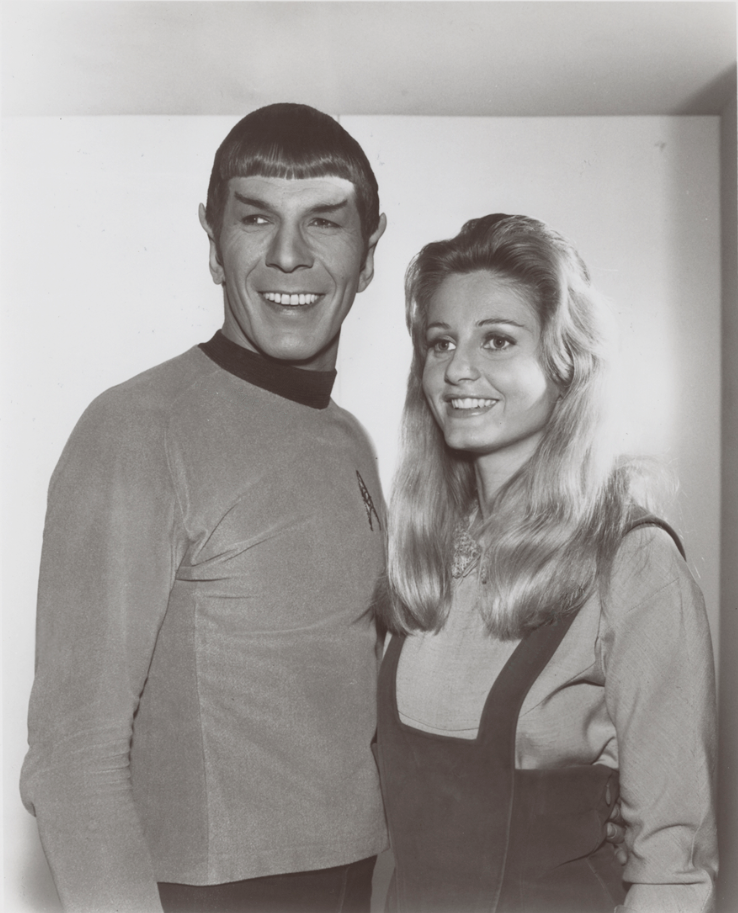
- A smiling Spock (Leonard Nimoy) and Leila Kalomi (Jill Ireland), from a publicity still
- Episode no.: Season 1 Episode 24
- Directed by: Ralph Senensky
- Story by: D. C. Fontana; Nathan Butler
- Teleplay by: D. C. Fontana
- Cinematography by: Gerald Finnerman
- Production code: 025
- Original air date: March 2, 1967

Guest appearances
- Jill Ireland – Leila Kalomi; Frank Overton – Elias Sandoval; Grant Woods – Lt. Kelowitz; Michael Barrier – Lt. DeSalle; Dick Scotter – Painter; Eddie Paskey – Crewman; Walker Edmiston – Voice of Transporter Chief

Episode chronology
← Previous "A Taste of Armageddon"	Next → "The Devil in the Dark"
- Star Trek: The Original Series season 1

"This Side of Paradise" is the twenty-fourth episode of the first season of the American science fiction television series Star Trek. Written by D. C. Fontana and Jerry Sohl (using the pseudonym Nathan Butler) and directed by Ralph Senensky, it was first broadcast on March 2, 1967.

In the episode, the USS Enterprise visits a planet where the inhabitants are under the influence of strange plant life.

The title is taken from the poem "Tiare Tahiti" by Rupert Brooke and the 1920 novel This Side of Paradise by F. Scott Fitzgerald.

== Plot ==
The USS Enterprise is ordered to a Federation colony on Omicron Ceti III. Captain Kirk, First Officer Spock, Chief Medical Officer Leonard McCoy, and others beam down to the colony, and discover the colonists all alive and well, a surprise since the planet is bathed in Berthold rays, a form of radiation which humans cannot survive for longer than a week; the colonists arrived three years previously. Their leader, Elias Sandoval, welcomes them and explains they only lost communications due to equipment failure. Also present is Leila Kalomi, a botanist Spock met on Earth six years before; she loved him, but he was unable to return her love. The landing party notices a lack of animal life, including livestock brought to the colony. During medical exams, McCoy finds no sign of disease or injury in any of them: even Sandoval, who has had an appendectomy, now has a healthy appendix. Kirk nonetheless insists that the colonists be evacuated due to the Berthold rays, over Sandoval's objections.

Kalomi offers to show Spock how the colonists have survived, and takes him to a field of strange flowers. The flowers expel spores that cover Spock, after which he professes his love for Kalomi, and blithely disregards orders to begin the evacuation of the colony. The rest of the landing party are also exposed to the spores and, with the exception of Kirk, exhibit the same sort of behavior. As part of a symbiotic relationship with their human hosts, the spores provide perfect health, including protection from Berthold rays.

Kirk returns to the ship while the rest of its crew, under the influence of spore plants that have been brought on board, beam down to the planet. Lt. Uhura has sabotaged the communication system to prevent contact with Starfleet. After exposure to the spores, Kirk too prepares to leave, but as he is about to beam down, he is seized by frustration at his own abandonment of the ship. The effect of the spores disappears, and Kirk surmises that violent emotions destroy them. Kirk lures Spock back aboard Enterprise and uses derogatory racial remarks to goad him into attacking. As Spock is about to bludgeon Kirk with a stool, he notices that the spores' influence on him is gone.

Kalomi beams aboard to find Spock no longer affected by the spores, and her heartbroken reaction frees her also. Kirk and Spock induce a similar effect on the planet below by broadcasting an irritating subsonic frequency to the crew's communicators, provoking fights among the colonists and crew. Once everyone is cleansed of the spores, Sandoval agrees to the evacuation.

As they leave orbit with the colonists aboard, Kirk asks Spock about his experiences on the planet. Spock replies, "I have little to say about it, Captain, except that for the first time in my life ... I was happy."

== Themes ==
A Thorneloe University document: "Modern Interpretations of the Lotus-Eaters", notes the parallels between the episode and Homer's Odyssey episode of the Lotus-eaters: "These two stories share a particular theme: the diversion or halting of one’s journey (either deliberately or accidentally) and how real life (i.e. the journey itself) cannot be lived on the extremes. ... The original Star Trek series aired in the late 1960s. It reflects the vast social change that was occurring at that time. ... The idea of living in peace and limiting work activities to only the essentials was (and still is, in many respects) contrary to the religious and political ideologies and realities of that era. ... The strong Protestant work-ethic present in American society meant a constant strive for development and dominance over nature, no matter the cost. ... The colonists failed to do this, thus their attempt to live in peace and to develop only what was necessary was considered a failure (as noted towards the end of the show). ... It was also a time of psychoactive drugs. The spores of the flowers could also represent the dangers of these drugs and their potential to help users escape reality."

== Production ==
- Writer Jerry Sohl had his name replaced by the pseudonym "Nathan Butler", after D. C. Fontana rewrote the original draft (entitled "The Way of the Spores").
- This was actor Frank Overton's last performance before his death on April 24, 1967, less than two months after the episode first aired.
- When Michael Barrier and Grant Woods were cast to play the characters Lieutenant Timothy Fletcher and Crewman Dimont, the names were changed to DeSalle and Kelowitz, whom the two actors had played in previous episodes.
- The shot of the empty Enterprise bridge was used as the blue-screen background in the Star Trek: The Next Generation episode "Relics", to depict Scotty's holodeck re-creation of his old ship.

== Reception ==
Zack Handlen of The A.V. Club gave this episode an "A" rating, describing it as "an intriguingly ambiguous episode", and he praised its sense of humor.

In 2015, SyFy ranked this episode as one of the top ten essential Star Trek original series Spock episodes.

In 2016, SyFy ranked guest star Jill Ireland's performance as Leila, as the 15th best guest star on the original series.

In 2016, Empire ranked this the 24th best out of the top 50 episodes of all the 700 plus Star Trek television episodes.

In 2016, IGN ranked "This Side of Paradise" the 24th best episode of all Star Trek including later series. They note this episode for featuring a romance of sorts between Spock and an inhabitant of the planet Omicron Ceti III.

In 2018, PopMatters ranked this the 18th best episode of the original series.

A 2018 Star Trek binge-watching guide by Den of Geek recommended this episode for featuring the trio of characters Kirk, Spock, and Bones of the original series.

In 2019, Nerdist included this episode on their "Best of Spock" binge-watching guide.
