= The Eleventh Hour (1962 TV series) =

American TV medical drama series (1962–1964)

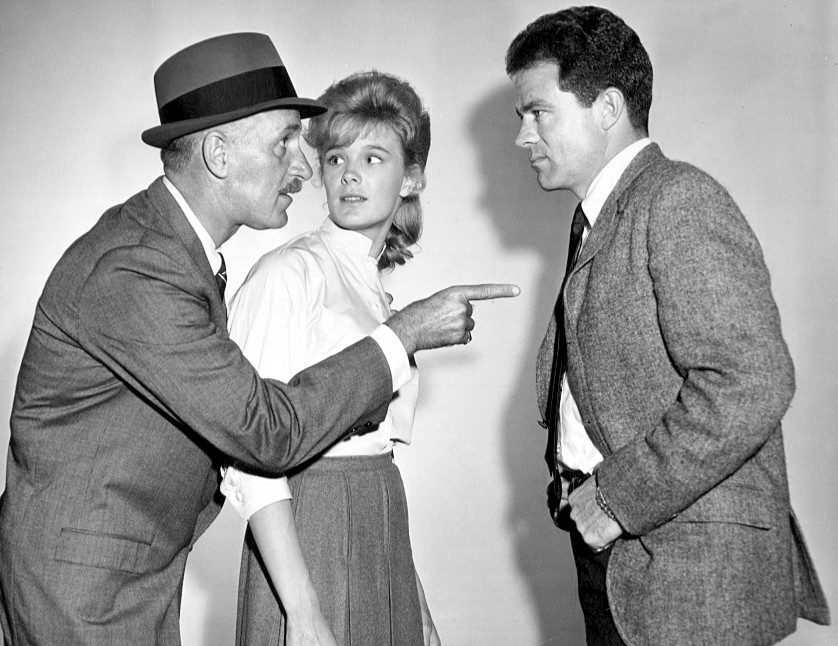
- Jack Ging (right) as Paul Graham with guest stars Keenan Wynn and Linda Evans.
- Genre: Medical drama
- Starring: Wendell Corey; Jack Ging; Ralph Bellamy
- Theme music composer: Cecil King Palmer; Harry Sukman
- Opening theme: "The Film Opens"
- Composers: Harry Sukman; Morton Stevens; John Williams
- Country of origin: United States
- Original language: English
- No. of seasons: 2
- No. of episodes: 62

Production
- Executive producer: Norman Felton
- Producer: Sam Rolfe
- Camera setup: Multi-camera
- Running time: 45–48 min
- Production companies: Arena Productions; MGM Television

Original release
- Network: NBC
- Release: October 3, 1962 – April 22, 1964

The Eleventh Hour is an American medical drama about psychiatry starring Wendell Corey, Jack Ging and Ralph Bellamy, which aired on NBC from October 3, 1962, to September 9, 1964.

== Plot ==
The Eleventh Hour was about psychiatry, both as it helped individuals deal with their problems and as it helped law enforcement agencies. The first season focused on psychiatrists Theodore Bassett and Paul Graham as they worked with people. The show's title related to "patients who came to them 'in the eleventh hour' — on the verge of breakdown". In addition to Bassett's clinical practice, he advised the police department and the state's department of correction. Many episodes had him evaluating people charged with crimes with regard to their mental competency.

In the second season, Bassett was replaced by L. Richard Starke, and he and Graham became more directly involved in cases.

== Cast ==
- Wendell Corey as Dr. Theodore Bassett (season 1)
- Ralph Bellamy as Dr. L. Richard Starke (season 2)
- Jack Ging as Dr. Paul Graham

== Guest stars ==
- Philip Abbott
- Neile Adams
- Eddie Albert
- Lola Albright
- Frank Aletter
- Richard Anderson
- Edward Andrews
- Edward Asner
- Frankie Avalon
- Phyllis Avery
- Martin Balsam
- Joanna Barnes
- Herschel Bernardi
- Charles Bickford
- Bill Bixby
- Beau Bridges
- Lloyd Bridges
- Lloyd Bochner
- Richard Bull
- Paul Burke
- Red Buttons
- James T. Callahan
- Joseph Campanella
- Mary Grace Canfield
- Diahann Carroll
- Veronica Cartwright
- Linden Chiles
- Virginia Christine
- Sandra Church
- James Coburn
- Michael Constantine
- Noreen Corcoran
- Patricia Crowley
- Kim Darby
- Olive Deering
- Colleen Dewhurst
- Bradford Dillman
- Elinor Donahue
- Tony Dow
- Howard Duff
- Dan Duryea
- Andrew Duggan
- Keir Dullea
- Jena Engstrom
- Linda Evans
- Shelley Fabares
- Fabian
- Norman Fell
- Anne Francis
- James Franciscus
- Beverly Garland
- John Goddard
- Harold Gould
- Don Gordon
- Don Grady
- Dabbs Greer
- Virginia Gregg
- James Gregory
- Harry Guardino
- Arthur Hanson
- Eileen Heckart
- Anne Helm
- Peter Helm
- Steven Hill
- Cheryl Holdridge
- Celeste Holm
- Ron Howard
- Kim Hunter
- Diana Hyland
- David Janssen
- Henry Jones
- Katy Jurado
- Noah Keen
- Warren J. Kemmerling
- Shirley Knight
- Ted Knight
- Harvey Korman
- Marta Kristen
- Lou Krugman
- Bert Lahr
- Elsa Lanchester
- Robert Lansing
- Angela Lansbury
- Piper Laurie
- Bethel Leslie
- Joanne Linville
- Robert Loggia
- Julie London
- Lynn Loring
- Tom Lowell
- James MacArthur
- Roddy McDowall
- John McGiver
- Barbara McNair
- Scott Marlowe
- Walter Matthau
- Jayne Meadows
- Burgess Meredith
- Dina Merrill
- Vera Miles
- Elizabeth Montgomery
- Bill Mumy
- Alan Napier
- Ed Nelson
- Lois Nettleton
- Leonard Nimoy
- Jeanette Nolan
- Edmond O'Brien
- Carroll O'Connor
- Jerry Paris
- Eleanor Parker
- Michael Parks
- Roger Perry
- Cliff Robertson
- Ruth Roman
- Marion Ross
- Barbara Rush
- Kurt Russell
- Robert Ryan
- Albert Salmi
- Telly Savalas
- Brenda Scott
- George C. Scott
- Jacqueline Scott
- Alfred Shelly
- Sylvia Sidney
- Tom Simcox
- Jean Stapleton
- Inger Stevens
- Dean Stockwell
- Maxine Stuart
- William Swan
- Karl Swenson
- George Takei
- Irene Tedrow
- Roy Thinnes
- Joan Tompkins
- Franchot Tone
- Rip Torn
- Harry Townes
- Maxine Stuart
- Robert Vaughn
- Robert Wagner
- Robert Walker Jr.
- Tuesday Weld
- Fay Wray
- Keenan Wynn

== Episodes ==
=== Season 1 (1962–63) ===
No. overall	No. in season	Title	Directed by	Written by	Original release date	Prod. code
1	1	"Ann Costigan: A Duel on a Field of White"	Fielder Cook	Harry Julian Fink	October 3, 1962	6701
2	2	"There Are Dragons in This Forest"	Boris Sagal	Theodore Apstein	October 10, 1962	6715
3	3	"Make Me a Place"	Paul Wendkos	Harry Fink & S.S. Schwietzer	October 17, 1962	6716
4	4	"I Don't Belong in a White-Painted House"	Don Medford	Harry Fink & Mark Rodgers	October 24, 1962	6719
5	5	"The Seventh Day of Creation"	William Graham	Harry Fink & Eric Stone	October 31, 1962	6711
6	6	"Of Roses and Nightingales and Other Lovely Things"	Walter Grauman	Theodore Apstein	November 7, 1962	6724
7	7	"Angie, You Made My Heart Stop"	Boris Sagal	Harry Fink & Oliver Crawford & Dick Nelson	November 14, 1962	6714
8	8	"Hooray, Hooray the Circus is Coming to Town"	Lawrence Dobkin	Harry Fink & Gene L. Coon	November 21, 1962	6718
9	9	"Cry a Little for Mary Too"	William Graham	Harry Fink & Sheldon Stark	November 28, 1962	6710
10	10	"Eat Little Fishie Eat"	Walter Grauman	Harry Fink & Leonard Kanter	December 5, 1962	
11	11	"The Blues My Baby Gave to Me"	William Graham	Harry Fink & Alfred Brenner	December 12, 1962	6721
12	12	"Along About Late in the Afternoon"	Paul Nickell	Harry Fink & Gene L. Coon	December 26, 1962	6705
13	13	"Which Man Will Die?"	Elliot Silverstein	Harry Fink & Leonard Kantor & Dick Nelson	January 2, 1963	6735
14	14	"Where Have You Been, Lord Randall, My Son?"	Paul Nickell	Harry Fink & Alfred Brenner & Jerome Ross	January 9, 1963	6704
15	15	"My Name is Judith, I'm Lost, You See"	Lawrence Dobkin	Harry Fink & Pat Fielder	January 16, 1963	6725
16	16	"Where Ignorant Armies Clash by Night"	Byron Paul	Harry Fink & Raphael Hayes	January 23, 1963	6734
17	17	"Advice to the Lovelorn and Shopworn"	Richard Donner	Sam Ross	January 30, 1963	6732
18	18	"Why Am I Grown So Cold?"	Byron Paul	Harry Fink & Robert Bloch & Dick Nelson	February 6, 1963	6729
19	19	"Like a Diamond in the Sky"	Jack Arnold	Harry Fink & Alfred Brenner	February 13, 1963	6733
20	20	"Beauty Playing a Mandolin Underneath a Willow Tree"	Abner Biberman	Harry Fink & Pat Fielder	February 20, 1963	6744
21	21	"A Tumble from a High, White Horse"	William Graham	Jack Jacobs & Dick Nelson	February 27, 1963	6739
22	22	"Five Moments Out of Time"	Jack Smight	Harry Fink & Jerry de Bono	March 6, 1963	6737
23	23	"The Wings of the Morning"	Jack Arnold	Harry Fink & Ellis Marcus	March 20, 1963	6748
24	24	"Hang by One Hand"	Boris Sagal	Harry Fink & Mort R. Lewis & Ellis Marcus	March 27, 1963	6746
25	25	"Something Crazy's Going on in the Back Room"	Robert Gist	Harry Fink & Jerry de Bono	April 3, 1963	6750
26	26	"Everybody Knows You've Left Me"	Jack Arnold	Harry Fink & Alfred Brenner	April 10, 1963	6747
27	27	"Try to Keep Alive Until Next Tuesday"	Don Medford	Theodore Apstein & Jerry De Bono	April 17, 1963	6740
28	28	"I Feel Like a Rutabaga"	Richard Donner	Harry Fink & Ellis Marcus	April 24, 1963	6755
29	29	"A Medicine Man in This Day and Age?"	John Peyser	S.S. Schweitzer	May 1, 1963	6726
30	30	"The Man Who Came Home Late"	Don Medford	Harry Fink & Dick Nelson	May 8, 1963	6745
31	31	"Pressure Breakdown"	Alex March	Harry Fink & Howard Dimsdale	May 15, 1963	6756
32	32	"The Middle Child Gets All the Aches"	William Graham	Harry Fink & Hilda Rolfe	May 22, 1963	6758

=== Season 2 (1963–64) ===
No. overall	No. in season	Title	Directed by	Written by	Original release date	Prod. code
33	1	"Cold Hands, Warm Heart"	John Newland	Theodore Apstein	October 2, 1963	6776
34	2	"The Silence of Good Men"	Unknown	Unknown	October 9, 1963	6779
35	3	"Fear Begins at 40"	Leonard Horn	Unknown	October 16, 1963	6760
36	4	"And Man Created Vanity"	Alan Reisner	Unknown	October 23, 1963	6778
37	5	"Oh, You Shouldn't Have Done It"	Alan Crosland, Jr.	Unknown	October 30, 1963	6751
38	6	"The Bronze Locust"	Alan Crossland, Jr.	Unknown	November 6, 1963	6770
39	7	"What Did She Mean by Good Luck?"	Don Medford	Harry Fink & Ellis Marcus	November 13, 1963	6765
40	8	"This Wonderful Madman Calls Me Beauty"	James Goldstone	Unknown	November 20, 1963	6771
41	9	"Four Feet in the Morning"	Jack Smight	Jerry De Bono	November 27, 1963	6775
Part two of a crossover with Dr. Kildare
42	10	"The Bride Wore Pink"	Robert Gist	Unknown	December 4, 1963	6731
43	11	"There Should Be an Outfit Called Families Anonymous!"	Robert Gist	Unknown	December 11, 1963	6765
44	12	"La Belle Indifference"	Leonard Horn	Jerome B. Thomas & John D.F. Black	December 18, 1963	6764
45	13	"Is Mr. Martian Coming Back?"	Richard Donner	Unknown	December 25, 1963	6752
46	14	"My Door is Locked and Bolted"	Alan Buckhantz	Unknown	January 1, 1964	6741
47	15	"Sunday Father"	Marc Daniels	Alvin Boretz & Lee Erwin	January 8, 1964	6781
48	16	"How Do I Say I Love You?"	Leonard Horn	Unknown	January 15, 1964	6781
49	17	"You're So Smart, Why Can't You Be Good?"	Marc Daniels	Unknown	January 22, 1964	6788
50	18	"Who Chopped Down the Cherry Tree?"	Alan Crosland, Jr.	Unknown	January 29, 1964	6723
51	19	"Cannibal Plants, They Eat You Alive"	Leon Benson	Unknown	February 5, 1964	6767
52	20	"The Only Remaining Copy is in the British Museum"	Alan Crosland, Jr.	Henry Misrock & Madeline Misrock	February 12, 1964	6792
53	21	"87 Different Kinds of Love"	Don Medford	Unknown	February 19, 1964	6784
54	22	"The Secret in the Stone"	Bernard Girard	Pat Fielder	February 26, 1964	6757
55	23	"A Full Moon Every Night"	Alan Reisner	Robert Presnell, Jr.	March 4, 1964	7303
56	24	"Who is to Say How the Battle is to Be Fought?"	Marc Daniels	Unknown	March 11, 1964	7302
57	25	"Prodigy"	John Newland	Unknown	March 18, 1964	6774
58	26	"Does My Mother Have to Know?: Part 1"	James Goldstone	Unknown	March 25, 1964	6769
59	27	"Does My Mother Have to Know?: Part 2"	James Goldstone	Unknown	April 1, 1964	6793
60	28	"A Pattern of Sundays"	Seymour Robbie	Unknown	April 8, 1964	7308
61	29	"To Love is to Live"	James Goldstone	Henry Misrock	April 15, 1964	7312
62	30	"The Color of Sunset"	Leo Penn	Unknown	April 22, 1964	7310

== Production ==
The executive producer was Norman Felton. Herbert Hirschman was the producer, Fielder Cook was the director, and Harry Julian Fink was the writer.

== Release ==
=== Broadcast ===
The Eleventh Hour aired on Wednesdays from 10 to 11 p.m. Eastern Time, following Perry Como's Kraft Music Hall and Espionage.

=== Home media ===
In June 2016, Warner Archive Collection released The Eleventh Hour- The Complete First Season on Region 1 DVD as a manufacture-on-demand (MOD) release.

== See also ==
- Breaking Point, a similar television series
