= Max Steiner filmography =

American composer filmography

Maximilian Raoul "Max" Steiner (May 10, 1888 – December 28, 1971) was an Austrian-born American composer of music for theatre and films. He was a child prodigy who conducted his first operetta when he was twelve and became a full-time professional, either composing, arranging or conducting, when he was fifteen.

Steiner composed over 300 film scores with RKO and Warner Brothers, and was nominated for 24 Academy Awards, winning three: The Informer (1935), Now, Voyager (1942), and Since You Went Away (1944). Besides his Oscar-winning scores, Steiner's other works include King Kong (1933), Little Women (1933), Jezebel (1938), Casablanca (1942), The Searchers (1956), A Summer Place (1959), and the film score for which he is possibly best remembered, Gone with the Wind (1939).

He was also the first recipient of the Golden Globe Award for Best Original Score, which he won for his score to Life with Father. Steiner was a frequent collaborator with some of the best known film directors active in the United States, including Michael Curtiz, John Ford, Howard Hawks, William Dieterle, William Wyler, Raoul Walsh, John Huston, Irving Pichel, King Vidor, and Frank Capra.

== Filmography ==
(as per AFI's database, unless otherwise noted)

All orchestration notes, additional composition, stock music, and main/end title notes come from the Max Steiner filmography in Film Composers in America.

The following list only comprises those films for which Steiner composed the score, or was credited as providing orchestration for. In addition to the films included in this list, Steiner also contributed to hundreds of other films for which his writing provided the stock music.

=== 1920s and 1930s ===
1929 through 1939
Year	Film	Director	Role	Production company	Awards	Notes	Orchestrator
1929	Rio Rita	Luther Reed	Film score	RKO Radio Pictures		Uncredited	
1930	The Delightful Rogue	Lynn Shores	Film score	RKO Radio Pictures		Uncredited; score for a foreign version of the 1929 film; co-written with Roy Webb	
1930	Side Street	Malcolm St. Clair	Film score	RKO Radio Pictures		Uncredited; score for a foreign version of the 1929 film; co-written with Roy Webb	
1930	The Case of Sergeant Grischa	Herbert Brenon	Film score	RKO Radio Pictures		Uncredited; Steiner composed only the main title	
1930	Dixiana	Luther Reed	Orchestration	RKO Radio Pictures		First screen credit	
1931	Are These Our Children?	Wesley Ruggles	Film score	RKO Radio Pictures			
1931	Bachelor Apartment	Lowell Sherman	Film score	RKO Radio Pictures		Uncredited; stock music also used	
1931	Beau Ideal	Herbert Brenon	Film score	RKO Radio Pictures		Uncredited; composed new main and end titles only (other music was stock)	
1931	Cimarron	Wesley Ruggles	Film score	RKO Radio Pictures		Uncredited	
1931	Consolation Marriage	Paul Sloane	Film score	RKO Radio Pictures			Gerstenberger
1931	Cracked Nuts	Edward F. Cline	Film score	RKO Radio Pictures			Marquardt
1931	Fanny Foley Herself	Melville W. Brown	Film score	RKO Radio Pictures		Uncredited	
1931	Friends and Lovers	Victor Schertzinger	Film score (co-written)	RKO Radio Pictures		screen credit states the score was co-written with Victor Schertzinger, but score and cue sheet show no signs of Steiner's work.	
1931	The Gay Diplomat	Richard Boleslawski	Film score	RKO Radio Pictures			
1931	High Stakes	Lowell Sherman	Film score	RKO Radio Pictures		Uncredited; stock music also used	
1931	Kept Husbands	Lloyd Bacon	Film score	RKO Radio Pictures		Uncredited; composed new main and end titles only	
1931	Peach O'Reno	William A. Seiter	Film score	RKO Radio Pictures		Uncredited	R. Heindorf
1931	The Public Defender	J. Walter Ruben	Film score	RKO Radio Pictures		Uncredited	E. Ross
1931	The Runaround	William James Craft	Film score	RKO Radio Pictures		Uncredited	
1931	Secret Service	J. Walter Ruben	Film score	RKO Radio Pictures		Uncredited	
1931	Transgression	Herbert Brenon	Film score	RKO Radio Pictures		Uncredited	
1931	Young Donovan's Kid	Fred Niblo	Film score	RKO Radio Pictures		Uncredited; composed new main title only	
1931	Way Back Home	William A. Seiter	Film score	RKO Radio Pictures		Uncredited	Gerstenberger
1932	The Animal Kingdom	Edward H. Griffith	Film score	RKO Radio Pictures			
1932	A Bill of Divorcement	George Cukor	Film score	RKO Radio Pictures		Main title by Harling	Kaun
1932	Bird of Paradise	King Vidor	Film score	RKO Radio Pictures			Kaun and R. Bassett
1932	The Conquerors	William Wellman	Film score	RKO Radio Pictures			Kaun
1932	Girl Crazy	William A. Seiter	Film score	RKO Radio Pictures		additional composition	
1932	Girl of the Rio	Herbert Brenon	Film score	RKO Radio Pictures		Uncredited	Gerstenberger
1932	The Half-Naked Truth	Gregory LaCava	Film score	RKO Radio Pictures			
1932	Is My Face Red?	William A. Seiter	Film score	RKO Radio Pictures			R. Heindorf and Kaun
1932	Ladies of the Jury	Lowell Sherman	Film score	RKO Radio Pictures		Uncredited; composed main title and stock music	R. Heindorf
1932	The Lost Squadron	George Archainbaud	Film score	RKO Radio Pictures		Uncredited	
1932	Men of Chance	George Archainbaud	Film score	RKO Radio Pictures		Uncredited	Gerstenberger
1932	The Most Dangerous Game	Richard Connell	Film score	RKO Radio Pictures			Kaun and Gerstenberger
1932	The Penguin Pool Murder	George Archainbaud	Film score	RKO Radio Pictures		composed main title	
1932	Roar of the Dragon	Wesley Ruggles	Film score	RKO Radio Pictures			Kaun and Gerstenberger
1932	State's Attorney	George Archainbaud	Film score	RKO Radio Pictures		Uncredited	R. Heindorf
1932	Symphony of Six Million	Gregory La Cava	Film score	RKO Radio Pictures			Kaun
1932	Thirteen Women	George Archainbaud	Film score	RKO Radio Pictures			Kaun and Gerstenberger
1932	What Price Hollywood?	George Cukor	Film score	RKO Radio Pictures			Kaun
1933	The Cheyenne Kid	Robert F. Hill	Film score	RKO Radio Pictures			
1933	Christopher Strong	Dorothy Arzner	Film score	RKO Radio Pictures		additional composition by Webb and orchestrated by Sharpe	Kaun
1933	Diplomaniacs	William A. Seiter	Film score	RKO Radio Pictures		with Webb	Kaune and Sharpe
1933	King Kong	Merian C. Cooper	Film score	RKO Radio Pictures			Kaun
1933	Little Women	George Cukor	Film score	RKO Radio Pictures			Kaun
1933	Lucky Devils	Ralph Ince	Film score	RKO Radio Pictures			
1933	Melody Cruise	Mark Sandrich	Film score	RKO Radio Pictures			
1933	The Monkey's Paw	Ernest B. Schoedsack	Film score	RKO Radio Pictures			Kaun
1933	Morning Glory	Lowell Sherman	Film score	RKO Radio Pictures			Kaun
1933	The Right to Romance	Alfred Santell	Film score	RKO Radio Pictures		additional composition for Webb's score	
1933	Scarlet River	Otto Brower	Film score	RKO Radio Pictures		Uncredited	
1933	The Silver Cord	John Cromwell	Film score	RKO Radio Pictures			
1933	Son of Kong	Ernest B. Schoedsack	Film score	RKO Radio Pictures			Kaun
1933	Sweepings	John Cromwell	Film score	RKO Radio Pictures			Kaun
1934	The Age of Innocence	Philip Moeller	Film score	RKO Radio Pictures			Kaun
1934	The Fountain	John Cromwell	Film score	RKO Radio Pictures			
1934	The Gay Divorcee	Mark Sandrich	Film score	RKO Radio Pictures	Nominated for Academy Award for Best Original Score		
1934	The Life of Vergie Winters	Alfred Santell	Film score	RKO Radio Pictures			Kaun
1934	The Little Minister	Richard Wallace	Film score	RKO Radio Pictures			Kaun
1934	The Lost Patrol	John Ford	Film score	RKO Radio Pictures	Nominated for Academy Award for Best Original Score		Kaun
1934	Murder on the Blackboard	George Archainbaud	Film score	RKO Radio Pictures		composed with Kaun	
1934	Of Human Bondage	John Cromwell	Film score	RKO Radio Pictures			Kaun
1934	Stingaree	William A. Seiter	Film score	RKO Radio Pictures			Kaun
1935	Break of Hearts	Philip Moeller	Film score	RKO Radio Pictures			Kaun
1935	I Dream Too Much	John Cromwell	Film score	RKO Radio Pictures			
1935	The Informer	John Ford	Film score	RKO Radio Pictures	Won the Academy Award for Best Original Score		Kaun and de Packh
1935	Roberta	William A. Seiter	Film score	RKO Radio Pictures			
1935	She	Irving Pichel; Lansing C. Holden	Film score	RKO Radio Pictures			Kaun, de Packh, and E. Powell
1935	Star of Midnight	Stephen Roberts	Film score	RKO Radio Pictures		includes stock music	
1935	The Three Musketeers	Irving Pichel; Lansing C. Holden	Film score	RKO Radio Pictures			Kaun
1935	Alice Adams	George Stevens	Film score	RKO Radio Pictures		with Webb	
1936	The Charge of the Light Brigade	Michael Curtiz	Film score	Warner Bros.			Hugo Friedhofer, Parrish, de Packh, and R. Bassett
1936	Follow the Fleet	Mark Sandrich	Film score	RKO Radio Pictures			
1936	The Garden of Allah	Richard Boleslawski	Film score	Selznick International Pictures	Nominated for the Academy Award for Best Original Score		Kaun, E. Powell, R. Bassett, Parrish, and Friedhofer
1936	Little Lord Fauntleroy	John Cromwell	Film score	Selznick International Pictures			Kaun
1937	First Lady	Stanley Logan	Film score	Warner Bros.			Friedhofer
1937	God's Country and the Woman	William Keighley	Film score	Warner Bros.			Friedhofer
1937	Green Light	Frank Borzage	Film score	Warner Bros.			Friedhofer
1937	Kid Galahad	Michael Curtiz	Film score	Warner Bros.		with Heinz Roemheld	
1937	The Life of Emile Zola	William Dieterle	Film score	Warner Bros.			Friedhofer
1937	Slim	Ray Enright	Film score	Warner Bros.		with Roemheld	Friedhofer
1937	A Star Is Born	William A. Wellman	Film score	Selznick International Pictures			Kaun, Parrish, and Friedhofer
1937	Submarine D-1	Lloyd Bacon	Film score	Cosmopolitan Productions			Friedhofer
1937	That Certain Woman	Edmund Goulding	Film score	Warner Bros.			Friedhofer
1937	Tovarich	Anatole Litvak	Film score	Warner Bros.		First use of Steiner's well-known fanfare for the "Warner Bros. Presents" screen	Friedhofer
1938	The Adventures of Tom Sawyer	Norman Taurog	Film score	Selznick International Pictures			Parrish and Kaun
1938	The Amazing Dr. Clitterhouse	Anatole Litvak	Film score	Warner Bros.			Parrish
1938	Angels with Dirty Faces	Michael Curtiz	Film score	Warner Bros.			Friedhofer
1938	Crime School	Lewis Seiler	Film score	Warner Bros.			Friedhofer and Parrish
1938	The Dawn Patrol	Edmund Goulding	Film score	Warner Bros.			Friedhofer
1938	Four Daughters	Michael Curtiz	Film score	Warner Bros.			Friedhofer
1938	Gold Is Where You Find It	Michael Curtiz	Film score	Warner Bros.			Friedhofer and Kaun
1938	Jezebel	William Wyler	Film score	Warner Bros.	Nominated for the Academy Award for Best Original Score		Friedhofer
1938	The Sisters	Anatole Litvak	Film score	Warner Bros.			Friedhofer
1938	White Banners	Edmund Goulding	Film score	Warner Bros.			
1939	Confessions of a Nazi Spy	Anatole Litvak	Film score	Warner Bros.		uncredited at Steiner's request	
1939	Dark Victory	Edmund Goulding	Film score	Warner Bros.	Nominated for the Academy Award for Best Original Score		Friedhofer
1939	Daughters Courageous	Michael Curtiz	Film score	Warner Bros.			R. Heindorf
1939	Dodge City	Michael Curtiz	Film score	Warner Bros.		additional composition by A. Deutsch	Friedhofer
1939	Dust Be My Destiny	Lewis Seiler	Film score	Warner Bros.			Friedhofer
1939	Each Dawn I Die	William Keighley	Film score	Warner Bros.			Friedhofer
1939	Four Wives	Michael Curtiz	Film score	Warner Bros.			Friedhofer and R. Heindorf
1939	Gone with the Wind	Victor Fleming	Film score	Selznick International Pictures; Metro-Goldwyn-Mayer	Nominated for the Academy Award for Best Original Score	additional composition by Friedhofer, A. Deutsch, Roemheld	Friedhofer, Kaun, R. Bassett, Deutsch, and others
1939	Intermezzo: A Love Story	Gregory Ratoff	Film score	Selznick International Pictures		additional composition by R. Bennett	R. Bennett, Friedhofer, Raab, de Packh, R. Bassett, and Salinger
1939	The Oklahoma Kid	Lloyd Bacon	Film score	Warner Bros.		additional composition by A. Deutsch and Friedhofer	Friedhofer, A. Deutsch, Parrish, and Cutter
1939	The Old Maid	Edmund Goulding	Film score	Warner Bros.			Friedhofer
1939	They Made Me a Criminal	Busby Berkeley	Film score	Warner Bros.			Friedhofer
1939	We Are Not Alone	Edmund Goulding	Film score	First National Pictures			Friedhofer

=== 1940s ===
1940 through 1949
Year	Film	Director	Role	Production company	Awards	Notes	Orchestrator
1940	All This, and Heaven Too	Anatole Litvak	Film score	Warner Bros.			Friedhofer
1940	City for Conquest	Anatole Litvak	Film score	Warner Bros.			Friedhofer and R. Heindorf
1940	A Dispatch from Reuter's	William Dieterle	Film score	Warner Bros.			Friedhofer
1940	Dr. Ehrlich's Magic Bullet	William Dieterle	Film score	Warner Bros.			Friedhofer
1940	The Letter	William Wyler	Film score	Warner Bros.	Nominated for the Academy Award for Best Original Score		Friedhofer
1940	Santa Fe Trail	Michael Curtiz	Film score	Warner Bros.		additional composition by Friedhofer	Friedhofer
1940	Virginia City	Michael Curtiz	Film score	Warner Bros.			Friedhofer
1941	The Bride Came C.O.D.	William Keighley	Film score	Warner Bros.			Friedhofer and R. Heindorf
1941	Dive Bomber	Michael Curtiz	Film score	Warner Bros.			Friedhofer
1941	The Great Lie	Edmund Goulding	Film score	Warner Bros.			Friedhofer and R. Heindorf
1941	One Foot in Heaven	Irving Rapper	Film score	Warner Bros.			Friedhofer
1941	Sergeant York	Howard Hawks	Film score	Warner Bros.	Nominated for the Academy Award for Best Original Score		Friedhofer
1941	Shining Victory	Irving Rapper	Film score	Warner Bros.			Friedhofer
1942	Captains of the Clouds	Michael Curtiz	Film score	Warner Bros.			Friedhofer and Kaun
1942	Casablanca	Michael Curtiz	Film score	Warner Bros.	Nominated for Academy Award for Best Original Score		Friedhofer
1942	Desperate Journey	Raoul Walsh	Film score	Warner Bros.		additional composition by Friedhofer	Friedhofer
1942	They Died with Their Boots On	Raoul Walsh	Film score	Warner Bros.			Friedhofer and Kaun
1942	The Gay Sisters	Irving Rapper	Film score	Warner Bros.			Friedhofer
1942	In This Our Life	John Huston	Film score	Warner Bros.			Friedhofer
1942	Now, Voyager	Irving Rapper	Film score	Warner Bros.	Won the Academy Award for Best Original Score		Friedhofer
1943	The Battle of Britain	Frank Capra	Original music compositions	U.S. War Department		Documentary; with Lava and H. Jackson	
1943	Mission to Moscow	Michael Curtiz	Film score	Warner Bros.			Kaun and Friedhofer
1943	Watch on the Rhine	Herman Shumlin	Film score	Warner Bros.			Friedhofer
1943	This is the Army	Michael Curtiz	Film score	Hal B. Wallis and Jack L. Warner		with Ray Heindorf	
1944	The Adventures of Mark Twain	Irving Rapper	Film score	Warner Bros.	Nominated for the Academy Award for Best Original Score		Kaun
1944	Arsenic and Old Lace	Frank Capra	Film score	Warner Bros.			Friedhofer
1944	The Conspirators	Jean Negulesco	Film score	Warner Bros.		additional composition by Friedhofer	Raab
1944	Passage to Marseille	Michael Curtiz	Film score	Warner Bros.			Raab
1944	Since You Went Away	John Cromwell	Film score	Selznick International Pictures	Won the Academy Award for Best Original Score		Grau, Raab, Moross, Zador
1944	Up in Arms	Elliott Nugent	Film score	Samuel Goldwyn Productions		additional composition by H. Jackson	
1945	The Corn Is Green	Irving Rapper	Film score	Warner Bros.			Friedhofer
1945	Mildred Pierce	Michael Curtiz	Film score	Warner Bros.			Friedhofer
1945	Rhapsody in Blue	Irving Rapper	Film score	Warner Bros.	Nominated for the Academy Award for Best Original Score		Friedhofer
1945	Roughly Speaking	Michael Curtiz	Film score	Warner Bros.			Friedhofer
1945	San Antonio	David Butler	Film score	Warner Bros.			Friedhofer
1945	Saratoga Trunk	Sam Wood	Film score	Warner Bros.		additional composition by Lava	Kaun
1946	The Beast with Five Fingers	Robert Florey	Film score	Warner Bros.			Cutter
1946	The Big Sleep	Howard Hawks	Film score	Warner Bros.			Bucharoff
1946	Cloak and Dagger	Fritz Lang	Film score	United States Pictures			Friedhofer
1946	My Reputation	Curtis Bernhardt	Film score	Warner Bros.			Friedhofer
1946	Night and Day	Michael Curtiz	Film score	Warner Bros.	Nominated for the Academy Award for Best Original Score		Friedhofer
1946	One More Tomorrow	Peter Godfrey	Film score	Warner Bros.		main title by Friedhofer	
1946	A Stolen Life	Curtis Bernhardt	Film score	Warner Bros.			Friedhofer
1946	Tomorrow Is Forever	Irving Pichel	Film score	International Pictures			Kaun
1946	Her Kind of Man	Frederick De Cordova	Film score	Warner Bros.		additional composition for Waxman's score	
1947	Cheyenne	Raoul Walsh	Film score	Warner Bros.			Friedhofer
1947	Deep Valley	Jean Negulesco	Film score	Warner Bros.			Cutter
1947	Life with Father	Michael Curtiz	Film score	Warner Bros.	Nominated for the Academy Award for Best Original Score		Cutter
1947	Love and Learn	Michael Curtiz	Film score	Warner Bros.			Cutter
1947	The Man I Love	Raoul Walsh	Film score	Warner Bros.			Friedhofer
1947	My Wild Irish Rose	David Butler	Film score	Warner Bros.	Nominated for the Academy Award for Best Original Score		Cutter
1947	Pursued	Raoul Walsh	Film score	Warner Bros.			Cutter
1947	The Unfaithful	Vincent Sherman	Film score	Warner Bros.			Cutter
1947	The Voice of the Turtle	Irving Rapper	Film score	Warner Bros.			Cutter
1948	Adventures of Don Juan	Vincent Sherman	Film score	Warner Bros.			Cutter
1948	April Showers	James V. Kern	Film score	Warner Bros.		additional composition for R. Heindorf's score	
1948	The Decision of Christopher Blake	Peter Godfrey	Film score	Warner Bros.			Cutter
1948	Fighter Squadron	Raoul Walsh	Film score	Warner Bros.			Cutter
1948	Johnny Belinda	Jean Negulesco	Film score	Warner Bros.	Nominated for the Academy Award for Best Original Score		Cutter
1948	Key Largo	John Huston	Film score	Warner Bros.			Cutter
1948	My Girl Tisa	Elliott Nugent	Film score	Warner Bros.			Cutter
1948	Silver River	Raoul Walsh	Film score	Warner Bros.			Cutter
1948	The Treasure of the Sierra Madre	John Huston	Film score	Warner Bros.			Cutter
1948	Winter Meeting	Bretaigne Windust	Film score	Warner Bros.			Cutter
1948	The Woman in White	Peter Godfrey	Film score	Warner Bros.			Cutter
1949	Beyond the Forest	King Vidor	Film score	Warner Bros.	Nominated for the Academy Award for Best Original Score		Cutter
1949	Flamingo Road	Michael Curtiz	Film score	Warner Bros.			Cutter
1949	The Fountainhead	King Vidor	Film score	Warner Bros.			Cutter
1949	A Kiss in the Dark	Delmer Daves	Film score	Warner Bros.			Cutter
1949	The Lady Takes a Sailor	Michael Curtiz	Film score	Warner Bros.			Cutter
1949	Mrs. Mike	Louis King	Film score	Nassour Pictures; Regal Films		additional composition by Lava	
1949	South of St. Louis	Ray Enright	Film score	Warner Bros.			Cutter
1949	White Heat	Raoul Walsh	Film score	Warner Bros.			Cutter
1949	Without Honor	Irving Pichel	Film score	Warner Bros.			Cutter

=== 1950s ===
Cutter orchestrated all of the movie scores that Steiner was the sole author of in the 1950s.

1950 through 1959
Year	Film	Director	Role	Production company	Awards	Notes
1950	The Breaking Point	Michael Curtiz	Film score	Warner Bros.		additional composition by H. Jackson
1950	Caged	John Cromwell	Film score	Warner Bros.		
1950	Dallas	Stuart Heisler	Film score	Warner Bros.		
1950	The Flame and the Arrow	Jacques Tourneur	Film score	Warner Bros.	Nominated for the Academy Award for Best Original Score	
1950	The Glass Menagerie	Irving Rapper	Film score	Warner Bros.		
1950	Rocky Mountain	William Keighley	Film score	Warner Bros.		
1950	Backfire	Vincent Sherman	additional composition	Warner Bros.		
1950	Young Man with a Horn	Michael Curtiz	Film score	Warner Bros.		main theme by R. Heindorf
1951	Close to My Heart	William Keighley	Film score	Warner Bros.		
1951	Distant Drums	Raoul Walsh	Film score	Warner Bros.		
1951	Force of Arms	Michael Curtiz	Film score	Warner Bros.		
1951	I Was a Communist for the FBI	Gordon Douglas	Film score	Warner Bros.		
1951	Jim Thorpe – All-American	Michael Curtiz	Film score	Warner Bros.		
1951	Lightning Strikes Twice	King Vidor	Film score	Warner Bros.		
1951	On Moonlight Bay	Roy Del Ruth	Film score	Warner Bros.		
1951	Operation Pacific	George Waggner	Film score	Warner Bros.		
1951	Raton Pass	Edwin L. Marin	Film score	Warner Bros.		
1951	Sugarfoot	Edwin L. Marin	Film score	Warner Bros.		
1951	Come Fill the Cup	Gordon Douglas	additional composition	Warner Bros.		
1952	The Jazz Singer	Michael Curtiz	Film score	Warner Bros.		
1952	The Lion and the Horse	Louis King	Film score	Warner Bros.		
1952	Mara Maru	Gordon Douglas	Film score	Warner Bros.		
1952	The Miracle of Our Lady of Fatima	John Brahm	Film score	Warner Bros.	Nominated for the Academy Award for Best Original Score	
1952	Room for One More	Norman Taurog	Film score	Warner Bros.		
1952	Springfield Rifle	André de Toth	Film score	Warner Bros.		
1952	The Iron Mistress	Gordon Douglas	Film score	Warner Bros.		
1952	I'll See You in My Dreams	Michael Curtiz	additional composition	Warner Bros.		with R. Heindorf
1952	This Woman is Dangerous	Felix E. Feist	additional composition	Warner Bros.		with Buttolph
1953	By the Light of the Silvery Moon	David Butler	Film score	Warner Bros.		
1953	The Charge at Feather River	Gordon Douglas	Film score	Warner Bros.		
1953	The Desert Song	H. Bruce Humberstone	Film score	Warner Bros.		
1953	So Big	Robert Wise	Film score	Warner Bros.		
1953	So This Is Love	Gordon Douglas	Film score	Warner Bros.		
1953	Trouble Along the Way	Michael Curtiz	Film score	Warner Bros.		
1953	This is Cinerama	Merian C. Cooper	Film score	Cinerama Releasing Corp.		additional composition by Webb, Sawtell, Shuken, and Cutner
1953	House of Wax	Andre DeToth	Trailer	Warner Bros.		
1954	The Boy from Oklahoma	Michael Curtiz	Film score	Warner Bros.		
1954	The Caine Mutiny	Edward Dmytryk	Film score	Columbia Pictures	Nominated for the Academy Award for Best Original Score	
1954	King Richard and the Crusaders	David Butler	Film score	Warner Bros.		
1955	Battle Cry	Raoul Walsh	Film score	Warner Bros.	Nominated for the Academy Award for Best Original Score	
1955	Helen of Troy	Robert Wise	Film score	Warner Bros.		
1955	Illegal	Lewis Allen	Film score	Warner Bros.		
1955	The Last Command	Frank Lloyd	Film score	Republic Pictures		
1955	The McConnell Story	Gordon Douglas	Film score	Warner Bros.		
1955	The Violent Men	Rudolph Maté	Film score	Columbia Pictures		
1956	Bandido	Richard Fleischer	Film score	United Artists		
1956	Come Next Spring	R. G. Springsteen	Film score	Republic Pictures		
1956	Death of a Scoundrel	Charles Martin	Film score	Warner Bros.		
1956	Hell on Frisco Bay	Frank Tuttle	Film score	Warner Bros.		
1956	The Searchers	John Ford	Film score	Warner Bros.		
1957	Band of Angels	Raoul Walsh	Film score	Warner Bros.		
1957	China Gate	Samuel Fuller	Film score	20th Century Fox		with H. Jackson; theme by V. Young
1957	Escapade in Japan	Arthur Lubin	Film score	RKO Radio Pictures		
1958	All Mine to Give	Allen Reisner	Film score	RKO Radio Pictures		
1958	Darby's Rangers	William Wellman	Film score	Warner Bros.		
1958	Fort Dobbs	Gordon Douglas	Film score	Warner Bros.		
1958	Marjorie Morningstar	Irving Rapper	Film score	Warner Bros.		
1959	The FBI Story	Mervyn LeRoy	Film score	Warner Bros.		
1959	The Hanging Tree	Delmer Daves	Film score	Warner Bros.		
1959	John Paul Jones	John Farrow	Film score	Warner Bros.		
1959	A Summer Place	Delmer Daves	Film score	Warner Bros.		

=== 1960s ===
Cutter orchestrated all of the movie scores that Steiner wrote in the 1960s.

1960 through 1969
Year	Film	Director	Role	Production company	Awards	Notes
1960	Cash McCall	Joseph Pevney	Film score	Warner Bros.		
1960	The Dark at the Top of the Stairs	Delmer Daves	Film score	Warner Bros.		
1960	Ice Palace	Vincent Sherman	Film score	Warner Bros.		
1961	Parrish	Delmer Daves	Film score	Warner Bros.		
1961	The Sins of Rachel Cade	Gordon Douglas	Film score	Warner Bros.		
1961	Susan Slade	Delmer Daves	Film score	Warner Bros.		
1961	Portrait of a Mobster	Joseph Pevney	Film score	Warner Bros.		Score arranged by Howard Jackson from four Max Steiner scores including The FBI Story.
1962	A Majority of One	Mervyn LeRoy	Film score	Warner Bros.		
1962	Rome Adventure	Delmer Daves	Film score	Warner Bros.		
1962	FBI Code 98	Leslie H. Martinson	Film score	Warner Bros.		
1963	Spencer's Mountain	Delmer Daves	Film score	Warner Bros.		
1964	A Distant Trumpet	Raoul Walsh	Film score	Warner Bros.		
1964	Youngblood Hawke	Delmer Daves	Film score	Warner Bros.		
1965	Two on a Guillotine	William Conrad	Film score	Warner Bros.		
1965	Those Calloways	Norman Tokar	Film score	Walt Disney Productions		
