= The Disappearance of Flight 412 =

- Genre: Drama; Mystery; Sci-Fi
- Written by: George Simpson; Neal R. Burger
- Directed by: Jud Taylor
- Starring: Glenn Ford; Bradford Dillman; David Soul
- Music by: Morton Stevens
- Country of origin: United States
- Original language: English

Production
- Producer: Gerald L. Adler
- Production locations: Oxnard Air Force Base, California; Edwards Air Force Base, California; Universal Studios - 100 Universal City Plaza, Universal City, California
- Cinematography: Robert B. Hauser
- Editor: Carroll Sax
- Running time: 72 minutes
- Production companies: Cine Films Inc. Cinemobile Productions

Original release
- Network: NBC
- Release: October 1, 1974

The Disappearance of Flight 412 is a 1974 American made-for-television science fiction drama film starring Glenn Ford, Bradford Dillman, David Soul and Guy Stockwell. The film was shown as an NBC World Premiere Movie in 1974.

== Plot ==
U.S. Air Force Colonel Pete Moore is the commander of the Whitney Air Force Base 458th Radar Test Group, which has been experiencing electrical difficulties aboard its aircraft. To find the problem, he sends a four-man crew on Flight 412, with Captain Bishop as commander. Lt Podryski, Capt Riggs, and Lt Ferguson are Bishop's crew. Shortly into the test, the Grumman Gulfstream II jet, a small twin-engine VIP transport, picks up three blips on radar. Subsequently, two fighters are scrambled to investigate, but they mysteriously disappear.

At this point, Flight 412 is ordered to land by an unnamed top-level military intelligence group that debunks UFO sightings (referred to throughout the film by their facility's radio call sign "Digger Control", though this is never implied to be the organization's actual name), diverted to a remote, abandoned military airfield somewhere in the desert in the American Southwest. The crew is taken to a barracks building to undergo an 18-hour debriefing by members of a military Special Investigation Division (SID) team, which is more like an indoctrination to convince them that they did not see a UFO. Meanwhile, their aircraft is stored in a dilapidated hangar to hide it from search-and-rescue aircraft. To all appearances, Flight 412 has simply vanished into thin air. Colonel Moore, with the help of Major Mike Dunning, sets out to discover what has happened to his crew.

Just as the government interrogation begins to raise doubts among the flight crew about the "flying saucer" sighting, Moore and Dunning find the secret base. Their efforts to release the crew are stymied by SID leader, Colonel Trottman, who cites national security concerns. Bishop attempts to escape, but Trottman threatens to make things rough on his crew, who agree to accept a sanitized version of their report. Moore presses Trottman for an explanation, despite warning from Dunning to drop the matter. Dunning appears to have faced similar treatment following an incident in which he too faced SID. After their release, when Dunning and Podryski choose to accept the report, the others (Moore, Bishop, Ferguson, and Riggs) seek the help of General Enright. Trottman appears and makes the case to the General that nothing untoward has happened. Speaking to Moore in private, General Enright reveals that some wreckage of the missing jets have been found, but only minimal remains. The pilots are still missing.

Moore tries to pursue the matter, but no one cares, likely because those responsible were unwilling to deal with the implications of the incident.

Four months later, the exercise is repeated, only now with more men overseeing it. Mysterious objects again appear, with the same results. Following a debrief, the matter is dropped.

Those who cooperate get promoted, while the others find that their careers suffer. Colonel Moore is denied multiple promotions, and retires at minimum age.

== Cast ==
Main roles:

- Glenn Ford as Colonel Pete Moore
- Bradford Dillman as Major Mike Dunning
- David Soul as Captain Roy Bishop
- Robert F. Lyons as Captain Cliff Riggs
- Guy Stockwell as Colonel Trottman
- Greg Mullavey as Lieutenant Tony Podryski
- Kent Smith as General Enright
- Stanley Bennett Clay as 2nd Lieutenant Ferguson (credited as Stanley Clay)
- Jonathan Goldsmith as Smith (credited as Jonathan Lippe)
- Jack Ging as Green
- Ken Kercheval as White
- Edward Winter as Mr. Cheer

The preponderance of stock footage was seen in the early part of the film

== Production ==
The Disappearance of Flight 412 was shot at Oxnard Air Force Base and Edwards Air Force Base. The film starts out with stock black-and-white clips of UFOs in flight and various individuals reporting sightings in newsreel style, with narrator voice-overs, to set the mood. However, the remainder of the film (in color) deals only briefly with the fictitious UFO encounter by the aircrew, focusing instead on their ordeal as they undergo an arduous debriefing and brainwashing (perhaps better described as gaslighting) at the hands of their somewhat mysterious captors. It uses on-screen time stamp titles to lend the feeling of a documentary, similar to the 1971 film The Andromeda Strain. (Note: The use of stock footage of aircraft is problematical. While period accurate U.S. Marine McDonnell Douglas F-4B Phantom II fighters are scrambled, the scene switches to Grumman F9F Panther fighter aircraft sent up as interceptors, an unlikely prospect, considering their retirement in the 1950s.)

== Reception ==
After its broadcast premiere, The Disappearance of Flight 412 was destined for late-night TV and lately, home media release. Later reviews have relegated the film to an also-ran due to its "cheesy" production values with a reliance on stock footage.
