= A Death of Innocence =

1971 made-for-TV film directed by Paul Wendkos

- Genre: Drama
- Based on: A Death of Innocence by Zelda Popkin
- Written by: Joseph Stefano
- Directed by: Paul Wendkos
- Starring: Shelley Winters; Arthur Kennedy; Tisha Sterling; Ann Sothern
- Music by: Morton Stevens
- Country of origin: United States
- Original language: English

Production
- Producer: Mark Carliner
- Cinematography: Ben Colman
- Editor: Gene Fowler Jr.
- Running time: 73 minutes
- Production company: CBS Entertainment

Original release
- Network: CBS
- Release: November 26, 1971

A Death of Innocence is a 1971 American made-for-television drama film directed by Paul Wendkos.

== Plot ==
A woman attends the murder trial of her daughter.

== Cast ==
- Shelley Winters as Elizabeth Cameron
- Arthur Kennedy as Mark Hirsch
- Tisha Sterling as Buffie Cameron
- Ann Sothern as Annie La Cossit
- John Randolph as Charles Cameron
- Harold Gould as Alexander Weisberg
- Antoinette Bower as Cara Fellman
- Peggy McCay as Helen McCloud
- Richard Bright as Jimmy Rekko
- Tony Young as Joe La Cossit
- Pilar Seurat as Miss Santiago
- Doreen Lang as Mary Fingerhut

== Reception ==
The film was very successful in the ratings being the second most watched movie on U.S. television during 1971 after Brian's Song with a Nielsen rating of 30.8 and an audience share of 55% (the share being more than Brian's Song's 48%).
