= The Storm Rider =

1957 film by Edward Bernds

- Theatrical release poster
- Directed by: Edward Bernds
- Screenplay by: Edward Bernds; Don Martin
- Based on: short story "Longrider Jones" by L. L. Foreman
- Produced by: Bernard Glasser
- Starring: Scott Brady; Mala Powers; Bill Williams; John Goddard; William Fawcett; Roy Engel
- Cinematography: Brydon Baker
- Music by: Les Baxter
- Production company: Regal Films Inc
- Distributed by: 20th Century Fox
- Release date: March 1957
- Running time: 72 minutes
- Country: United States
- Language: English

The Storm Rider is a 1957 American Western film directed by Edward Bernds, written by Edward Bernds and Don Martin, and starring Scott Brady, Mala Powers, Bill Williams, John Goddard, William Fawcett and Roy Engel. It is based on the short story "Longrider Jones" by L. L. Foreman, from the book Rider's West. The film was released in March 1957, by 20th Century Fox.

== Cast ==
- Scott Brady as Bart Jones
- Mala Powers as Tay Rorick
- Bill Williams as Sheriff Pete Colton
- John Goddard as Harry Rorick
- William Fawcett as Captain Cruickshank
- Roy Engel as Major Bonnard
- George Keymas as Apache Kid
- Olin Howland as Will Collins
- Bud Osborne as Toby
- James Dobson as Frank Cooper
- Rocky Lundy as Bud Cooper
- Hank Patterson as Tom Milstead
- Wayne Mallory as Hanks
- Court Shepard as Brass Flood
- Frank Richards as Will Feylan
- Tom London as Todd (uncredited)

== Producer ==
Scott Brady co produced the film.
