= Kent Smith =

American actor (1907–1985)

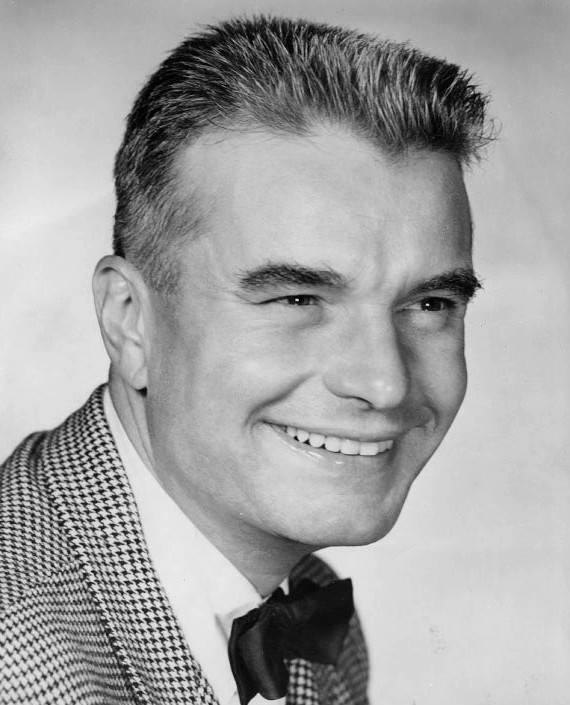
- Smith in 1953
- Born: Frank Kent Smith; March 19, 1907; New York City, U.S.
- Died: April 23, 1985 (aged 78); Woodland Hills, California, U.S.
- Occupation: Actor
- Years active: 1929-1978
- Spouses: Betty Gillette (m. 1937; div. 1954) Edith Atwater (m. 1962)
- Children: 1

Frank Kent Smith (March 19, 1907 – April 23, 1985) was an American actor who had a lengthy career in film, theatre and television.

== Early years ==
Smith was the son of Mr. and Mrs. James E. Smith. He was born in New York City and was educated at Lincoln School, Phillips Exeter Academy in Exeter, New Hampshire, and at Harvard University.

== Stage ==
Smith's early acting experience started in 1925 when he was one of the founders of the Harvard University Players, which later included Henry Fonda, James Stewart, Joshua Logan and Margaret Sullavan in Falmouth, Massachusetts. Smith's stock experience included productions with the Maryland Theatre in Baltimore. His professional acting debut was in 1929 in Blind Window in Baltimore. He made his Broadway acting debut in 1932 in Men Must Fight. He appeared on Broadway in Measure for Measure; Sweet Love Remembered; The Best Man; Ah, Wilderness!; Dodsworth (1934); Saint Joan (1936); Old Acquaintance (1941); Antony and Cleopatra (1948) and Bus Stop (1956). Smith appeared as the Leading Man for the 1938 Summer stock season at Elitch Theatre.

== Film ==
Smith moved to Hollywood, California, where he made his film debut in The Garden Murder Case.

His biggest successes occurred during the 1940s in films such as Cat People (1942), Hitler's Children (1943), This Land Is Mine (1943), Three Russian Girls (1943), Youth Runs Wild (1944), The Curse of the Cat People (1944), The Spiral Staircase (1946), Nora Prentiss (1947), Magic Town (1947), My Foolish Heart (1949), The Fountainhead (1949), and The Damned Don't Cry (1950). He continued acting in films such as Comanche (1956); Sayonara (1957); Party Girl (1958); The Mugger (1958); Imitation General (1958); The Badlanders (1958); This Earth Is Mine (1959); Strangers When We Meet (1960); Susan Slade (1961); The Balcony (1963); A Distant Trumpet (1964); Youngblood Hawke (1964); The Young Lovers (1964); The Trouble with Angels (1966); A Covenant with Death (1967); Games (1967); The Money Jungle (1968); Kona Coast (1968); Assignment to Kill (1968); Death of a Gunfighter (1969); The Games (1970); Pete 'n' Tillie (1972); Die Sister, Die! (1972); the (1973) made-for-tv horror film, The Cat Creature; Lost Horizon (1973) and Billy Jack Goes to Washington (1977).

During World War II, Smith served as a private in the U.S. Army, making training films covering medicine, dentistry, artillery, electronics, and other topics

== Television ==
=== Regular cast ===
Kent Smith played the imperious Dr. Morton on the popular series Peyton Place with his real-life wife (Edith Atwater) cast as Mrs. Morton. Smith played Edgar Scoville in the second season of the science-fiction series The Invaders (1967-1968) and was a host for the anthology series Philip Morris Playhouse (1953-1954).

=== Guest appearances ===
Smith had roles in TV movies such as How Awful About Allan (1970), The Night Stalker (1972), The Judge and Jake Wyler (1972), The Cat Creature (1973), The Affair (1973) and The Disappearance of Flight 412 (1974). His numerous television credits included a continuing role in Peyton Place as Dr. Robert Morton. He began guest-starring in television series in 1949 in The Philco Television Playhouse and appeared in Robert Montgomery Presents; General Electric Theater; Alfred Hitchcock Presents; Naked City; Have Gun – Will Travel; Perry Mason; Gunsmoke “Beaton” (1963), a man trying to steal two Irish immigrants’ land in “Two of a Kind” (S8E27, 1963), "Dakota" (1963), and as an aging gunslinger in “The Glory & The Mud” (S9E14); The Beverly Hillbillies; Rawhide S2 E8 as Capt. Loomis in "Incident of the Haunted Hills" (1959); The Americans; Barnaby Jones; Wagon Train in 1957 as "Professor Paul Owens", husband to Shelley Winters, in "The Ruth Owens Story" (S1E3), and in 1959 S3 E14 "The Lita Foladaire Story" as Jess Foladaire; The Outer Limits; The Alfred Hitchcock Hour S1 E4 as Jerry O'Hara in "I Saw the Whole Thing" (1962); Mission: Impossible ("The Confession" 1/22 (1967); Night Gallery and the 1976 miniseries Once an Eagle.

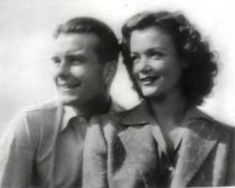
Kent Smith and Simone Simon in Curse of the Cat People (1944)

He played Governor Winston Brubaker in The Wild Wild West S3 E12 "The Night of the Legion of Death" which aired 11/22/1967. He appeared in the musical remake of Lost Horizon (1972), and the television movie Probe (1972), that would become the pilot for the TV series Search.

== Personal life and death ==
Smith was married to actress Betty Gillette from 1937 until their divorce in 1954 and to actress Edith Atwater from 1962 until his death from congestive heart failure in Woodland Hills, California at the age of 78. He was survived by his wife and daughter.

In 1961, Smith said: "I'm capricious when there's a national election. My background's Republican, but whenever I'm planted in a city long enough to vote on the local level, I find I'm against whoever is in office."

== Filmography ==
Year	Title	Role	Notes
1936	The Garden Murder Case	Woode Swift	
1939	Back Door to Heaven	Attorney	
1942	Cat People	Oliver Reed	
1943	Hitler's Children	Professor Nichols	
1943	Forever and a Day	Gates Trimble Pomfret	
1943	This Land Is Mine	Paul Martin	
1943	Three Russian Girls	John Hill	alternate title: She Who Dares
1944	The Curse of the Cat People	Oliver Reed	
1944	Resisting Enemy Interrogation	Captain Reining, American Working for the Nazis	
1944	Youth Runs Wild	Danny Coates	
1946	The Spiral Staircase	Dr. Parry	
1947	Nora Prentiss	Dr. Richard Talbot	
1947	Magic Town	Professor Frederick Hoopendecker	
1947	The Voice of the Turtle	Kenneth Bartlett	
1949	The Fountainhead	Peter Keating	
1949	My Foolish Heart	Lew Wengler	
1950	The Damned Don't Cry	Martin Blankford	
1950	This Side of the Law	David Cummins	
1952	Paula	John Rogers	alternate title: The Silent Voice
1956	Comanche	Quanah Parker	
1957	Sayonara	General Mark Webster	
1958	Imitation General	Brigadier General Charles Lane	
1958	The Badlanders	Cyril Lounsberry	
1958	Party Girl	Jeffrey Stewart	
1958	The Mugger	Dr. Pete Graham	
1959	This Earth Is Mine	Francis Fairon	
1959	Alfred Hitchcock Presents	Gilbert Hughes	Season 4 Episode 34: "A True Account"
1960	Strangers When We Meet	Stanley Baxter	
1961	Susan Slade	Dr. Fane	
1961	Rawhide	Captain Loomis	S2:E8, "Incident of the Haunted Hills"
1962	Moon Pilot	Secretary of the Air Force	
1962	The Alfred Hitchcock Hour	Jerry O'Hara	Season 1 Episode 4: "I Saw the Whole Thing"
1963	The Balcony	General	
1964	A Distant Trumpet	Secretary of War	
1964	Youngblood Hawke	Paul Winter Sr.	
1964	The Young Lovers	Dr. Shoemaker	
1964	The Alfred Hitchcock Hour	Dr. Sam Adamson	Season 2 Episode 32: "Body in the Barn"
1964	Rawhide	Colonel Greer	S6:E23, "Incident at Hourglass"
1965	The Alfred Hitchcock Hour	Mr. Benner	Season 3 Episode 22: "Thou Still Unravished Bride"
1966	The Trouble with Angels	Uncle George	
1967	A Covenant with Death	Parmalee	
1967	Games	Harry Gordon	
1967	The Money Jungle	Paul Kimmel	
1967	Mission Impossible	Congressman Townsend	"The Confession"
1968	Assignment to Kill	Mr. Eversley	
1968	Kona Coast	Akamai	
1969	Death of a Gunfighter	Andrew Oxley	
1970	The Games	Kaverley	
1970	How Awful About Allan	Raymond Colleigh	ABC Movie of the Week
1971	The Last Child	Gus Iverson	ABC Movie of the Week
1972	The Night Stalker	District Attorney Tom Paine	ABC Movie of the Week
1972	Probe	Dr. Edward Laurent	TV movie
1972	Another Part of the Forest	Simon Isham	TV movie
1972	The Crooked Hearts	James Simpson	TV movie
1972	The Judge and Jake Wyler	Robert Dodd	TV movie
1972	Pete 'n' Tillie	Father Keating	
1972	Call Me by My Rightful Name	Mr. Watkins	
1973	Lost Horizon	Bill Fergunson	
1973	Maurie	Dr. Walker	uncredited
1973	Cops and Robbers	Bit Part	uncredited
1973	The Affair	Mr. Patterson	ABC Movie of the Week
1973	The Cat Creature	Frank Lucas	ABC Movie of the Week
1974	Murder or Mercy	Judge	ABC Movie of the Week
1974	The Disappearance of Flight 412	General Enright	TV movie
1976	Once an Eagle	General Jacklyn	TV miniseries
1977	Billy Jack Goes to Washington	Senator Joe Foley	
1978	Die Sister, Die!	Dr. Thorne	alternate title: The Companion final film role
