= Antoinette Bower =

British-American actress (1932–2026)

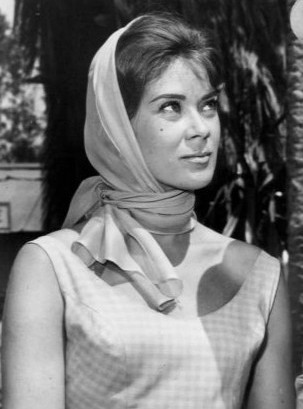
- Bower as guest star on Adventures in Paradise, 1961
- Born: 30 September 1932; Baden-Baden, Republic of Baden, Germany
- Died: 30 April 2026 (aged 93); Eagle Rock, California, U.S.
- Years active: 1954–1992
- Known for: Catspaw; Neon Rider
- Spouse: James Francis Gill (m. 1962)

Antoinette Alexandra Jane Bower (30 September 1932 – 30 April 2026) was a British-American actress, whose career lasted nearly four decades, appearing in numerous television shows in Hollywood.

== Early years ==
Bower was born in Baden-Baden, Germany on 30 September 1932, to a German mother and an English father. She lived in England, Vienna, and Monte Carlo and was educated in England. She moved to Canada in 1953.

== Career ==
=== Early career ===
Bower worked as a disc jockey at a radio station in Owen Sound, Ontario. She moved to Toronto to pursue acting, appearing in stage productions at the newly opened Crest Theatre, the first in that city to consistently mount Canadian productions rather than touring productions from the US or Britain.

=== Television ===
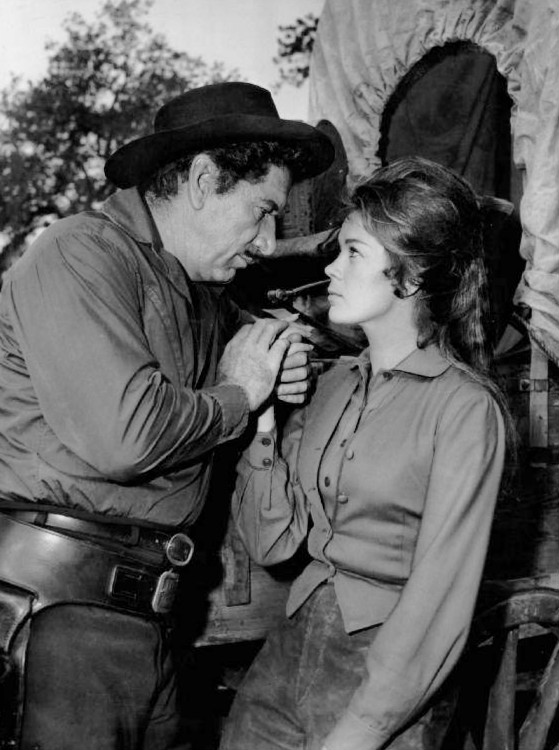
Richard Boone and Antoinette Bower in Have Gun - Will Travel in 1961

Bower started her television career in Canada in 1958, appearing in the CBC Television made-for-TV film The Telltale Heart, and in an episode of The Unforeseen. She had a recurring role in Hudson's Bay (1959), and appeared in episodes of Heritage in 1960. That same year, she wrote, produced and narrated an hour-long profile of actor Barry Morse and his family for CBC Radio.

While visiting friends in Los Angeles, Bower landed her first role on an American series, appearing in the January 1961 episode "Night Cry", of the series Hong Kong. She continued working in the 1960s in Thriller, Alfred Hitchcock Presents, The Twilight Zone (1963) as Eve Norda in the episode "Probe 7, Over and Out". Bower continued with steady work on American television, amassing appearances on such programs as Ben Casey, The Fugitive, Combat!, 12 O'Clock High, Kraft Suspense Theatre as Gillian ("Rapture at Two-Forty", pilot for Run for Your Life), The Invaders, Mannix, Mission: Impossible (in 4 episodes), Perry Mason, The Big Valley, Star Trek ("Catspaw"), Hogan's Heroes (in 3 different roles), and The Name of the Game ("Laurie Marie"). In the 1970s and 1980s, Bower was in Cannon, Columbo, Hawaii Five-O, The Six Million Dollar Man, Kojak, Hart to Hart, the made-for-TV movies A Death of Innocence (1971) and The Cowboy and the Ballerina (1984), and Murder, She Wrote. She appeared in the miniseries The Thorn Birds (1983).

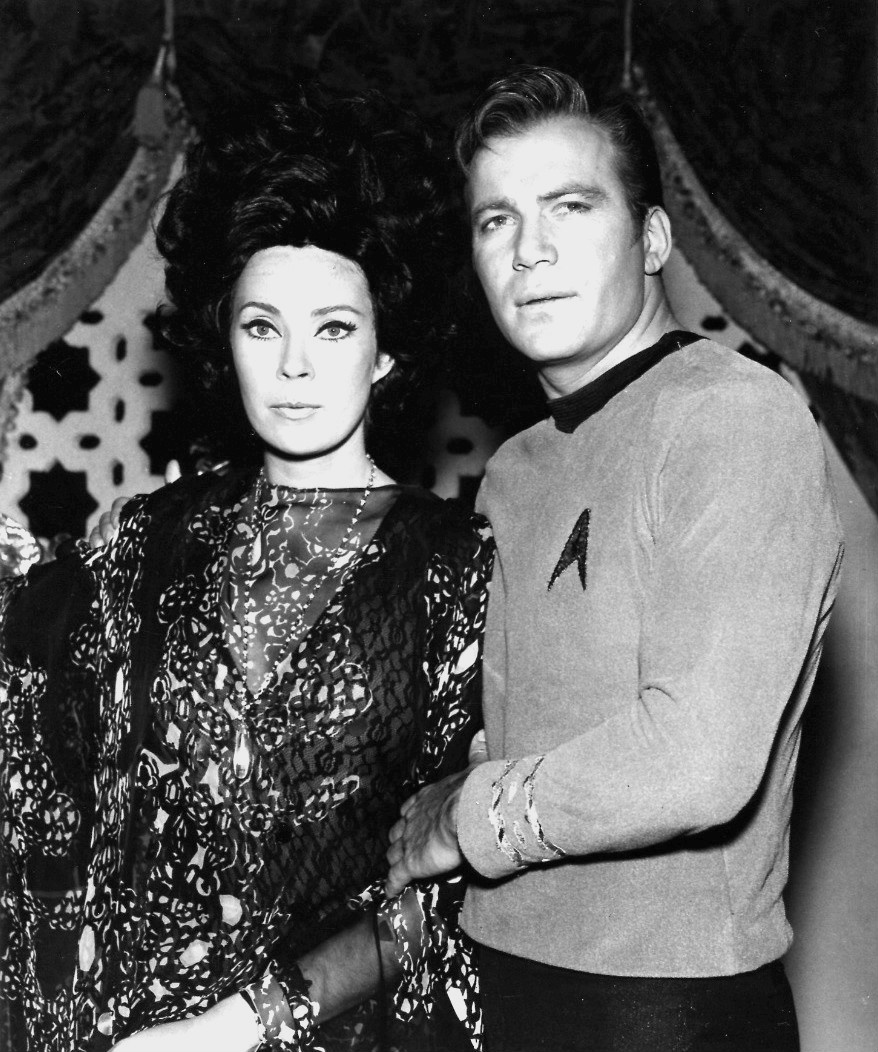
Antoinette Bower and William Shatner in the second season Star Trek episode "Catspaw" in 1967

Bower completed her nearly 40-year acting career where she first started, returning to Canada to join the main cast for the first three seasons (1990–1993) of the series Neon Rider, this time on the CTV Television Network.

=== Film ===
Bower was in Mutiny on the Bounty (1962), The Mephisto Waltz (1971), and Superbeast (1972). She appeared in the movies Die Sister, Die! (1972, released in 1978), Prom Night,, Blood Song (1982), Time Walker (1982), The Evil That Men Do (1984), and Club Paradise (1986).

=== Radio ===
In 1979, Bower co-starred in four episodes of Mutual Radio Theater. They were titled Carmella (March 7), Assassin (May 9), Test of Love (May 23), and Whisper in My Ear (June 6).

== Personal life and death ==
Reserved when discussing her private life in the press, Bower did state, in a 1968 interview with the Canadian magazine Weekend, that she was married to Texas-born artist James Francis Gill, whom she met when he moved to Los Angeles in 1962.

Bower died at an Eagle Rock senior retirement home in Los Angeles, on 30 April 2026, at the age of 93.

== Filmography ==
=== Film ===
Year	Title	Role	Director(s)	Notes	Ref.
1962	Mutiny on the Bounty	Lady Gwendenare	Lewis Milestone	Epic adventure historical drama film Based on the 1935 novel of the same name by Charles Nordhoff and James Norman Hall; Uncredited	
1971	The Mephisto Waltz	Member of Ely's Group	Paul Wendkos	Supernatural horror film Based on The Mephisto Waltz (1969) by Fred Mustard Stewart; Uncredited	
1972	Superbeast	Dr. Alix Pardee	George Schenck	Horror film	
1978	Die Sister, Die!	Esther Harper	Randall Hood	Thriller film Filmed in 1972	
1980	Prom Night	Mrs. Hammond	Paul Lynch	Mystery slasher film	
1982	Blood Song	Bea	Alan J. Levi	Slasher film	
1982	Time Walker	Dr. Hayworth	Tom Kennedy	Science fiction horror film	
1984	The Evil That Men Do	Claire Moloch	J. Lee Thompson	Action thriller film Based on The Evil That Men Do (1978 novel) by R. Lance Hill	
1986	Club Paradise	Pamela	Harold Ramis	Comedy film	

=== Television ===
Year	Title	Role	Notes
1958	The Tell-Tale Heart	Guest	Adaptation of the short story by Edgar Allan Poe
1958	The Unforeseen	Guest	Episode: "The Key"
1959	Hudson's Bay	Various	3 episodes
1960	Heritage	Guest	Episode: "The Great in the Heart"
1960–1961	Adventures in Paradise	Sarah; Vicki	Episodes: "Hangman's Island"; "Command at Sea"
1961	Hong Kong	Laura Marriott	Episode: "Night Cry"
1961	The Tab Hunter Show	Maggie	Episode: "Galatea"
1961	The Aquanauts	Linda Liggett	Episode: "The Tidal Wave Adventure"
1961	Have Gun – Will Travel	Sybil Lansing	Episode: "The Piano"
1961	Wagon Train	Diana Saybrook	Episode: "The Bruce Saybrook Story"
1961–1962	Thriller	Sheila Corbett; Annette Jacquelin	Episodes: The Return of Andrew Bentley"; "Waxworks"
1961–1962	Alfred Hitchcock Presents	Miss Greco; Elisa Minden	Episodes: "A Woman's Help"; "The Silk Petticoat"
1962	Hawaiian Eye	Susan Woodruff	Episode: "'V' is for Victim"
1962	Kraft Mystery Theatre	Helen Webster	Episode: "Sound of Murder"
1962–1963	Perry Mason	Ellen Carson; Linda Blake	Episodes: "The Case of the Ancient Romeo"; "The Case of the Bluffing Blast"
1963	Stoney Burke	Erna Bremen	Episode: "Point of Entry"
1963	Combat!	Jeanine	Episode: "The Battle of the Roses"
1963	The Twilight Zone	Eve Norda	Episode: "Probe 7, Over and Out"
1963–1964	The Travels of Jaimie McPheeters	Nellie	Episodes: "The Day of the Homeless"; "The day of the Tin Trumpet"
1964	The Great Adventure	Anna Pratt	Episode: "The Special Courage of Captain Pratt"
1964–1966	12 O'Clock High	Various	3 episodes
1965	Kraft Suspense Theatre	Gillian	Episode: "Rapture at Two-Forty"; Pilot for Run for Your Life
1965	The Man from U.N.C.L.E.	Delilah Dovro	Episode: "The Bow-Wow Affair"
1965	Burke's Law	Countess Anna Marie Mouton	Episode: "Operation Long Shadow"
1965	Convoy	Kay	Episode: "Felicia"
1965	The Wild Wild West	Janet Coburn	Episode: "The Night of Sudden Death"
1965	Ben Casey	Julie Jacoby; Ann Phelps	Episodes: "Journeys End in Lovers Meeting"; "War of Nerves"; "No More, Cried The Rooster - There Will Be Truth"
1965–1966	The Wackiest Ship in the Army	Various	3 episodes
1966	I Spy	Shelby Clavell	Episodes: "Return to Glory"; "Crusade in Limbo"
1966	A Man Called Shenandoah	Lila Morgan	Episode: "Aces and Kungs"
1966	Bob Hope Presents the Chrysler Theatre	Maureen Hollings	Episode: "One Embezzlement and Two Margaritas"
1966	Jericho	Marissa	Episodes: "One for the Mountain, part 1"; "One for the Mountain, part 2"
1966	Iron Horse	Angie Bemis	Episode: "Town Full of Fear"
1966–1967	The Fugitive	Various	3 episodes
1967	T.H.E. Cat	Gail Ogden	Episode: "The Blood-Red Night"
1967	The Scorpio Letters	Terry	Made-for-TV movie directed by Richard Thorpe
1967	The Invaders	Laurie CKeller	Episode: "Condition Red"
1967	Star Trek	Sylvia	Episode: "Catspaw"
1967	Tarzan	Helge Egger	Episode: "The Last of the Supermen"
1967	The Felony Squad	Betty Lasher	Episode: "My Mommy Got Lost"
1967–1968	Cowboy in Africa	Bibi Graf; Ellen Cromwell	Episodes: "The New World"; "The Lions"
1967–1969	Hogan's Heroes	Various	3 episodes
1967–1971	Mission: Impossible	Various	3 episodes
1967–1972	Ironside	Andra Bellingham; Judy Klaven	Episodes: "Tagged for Murder"; "Buddy, Can You Spare a Life?"
1967–1973	The F.B.I.	Various	3 episodes
1968	The Big Valley	Alicia Akers	Episode: "Deathtown"
1968	Bonanza	Martha Cartwright Dorcas	Episode: "Little Girl Lost"
1968	The Sunshine Patriot	Iris	Made-for-TV movie directed by Joseph Sargent
1968	Insight	Lila	Episode: "The Late Great God"
1968–1969	Mannix	Gail Mason; Barbara Sanderson	Episodes: "Deadfall: Part 1"; "Deadfall: Part 2"; "Shadow of a Man"
1969	Hawaii Five-O	Margi Carstairs	Episode: "Six Kilos"
1969	Get Smart	Valerie	Episode: "Valerie of the Dolls"
1969	Lancer	Angeline Ferris	Episode: "The Black Angel"
1969	The Name of the Game	Katherine Benning	Episode: "Laurie Marie"
1970	The Young Lawyers	Dr. Hilary Sadler	Episode: "A Busload of Bishops"
1971	A Death of Innocence	Cara Fellman	Made-for-TV movie directed by Paul Wendkos
1971	See The Man Run	Peggi Larson	Made-for-TV movie directed by Corey Allen
1972	The Whiteoaks of Jalna	Roma Fitzsturgis	Recurring
1973	Search	Contessa Penny Lucchese	Episode: "A Honeymoon to Kill"
1973	Hawkins	Vivian Vincent	Episode: "Death and the Maiden"
1973	The Starlost	Dr. Heather Marshall	Episode: "The Beehive"
1974	The Wide World of Mystery	Contessa	Episode: "A Beautiful Killing"
1974	Columbo	Frances Galesko	Episode: "Negative Reaction"
1975	Archer	Melissa Stonehurst	Episode: "Shades of Blue"
1976	Cannon	Karen Jennings	Episode: "Point After Death"
1976	The Six Million Dollar Man	Nora Crandall	Episode: "A Bionic Christmas Carol"
1978	Kojak	Diane Marco	Episode: "Photo Must Credit Joe Paxton"
1978	First, You Cry	Marsha	Made-for-TV movie directed by George Schaefer
1982	Hart to Hart	Maris Thorn	Episode: "On a Bed of Harts"
1982	Bring 'Em Back Alive	Lady Selwyn	Episode: "The Pied Piper"
1983	The Thorn Birds	Sarah McQueen	Miniseries "Part 1" and "Part 2"
1984	The Cowboy and the Ballerina	Madame Rostov	Made-for-TV movie directed by Jerry Jameson
1987	Murder, She Wrote	Mrs. Audrey Martin	Episode: "If It's Thursday, It Must Be Beverly"
1990–1992	Neon Rider	Fox Devlin	Seasons 1–3: 42 episodes
