= Jack Ging =

American actor (1931–2022)

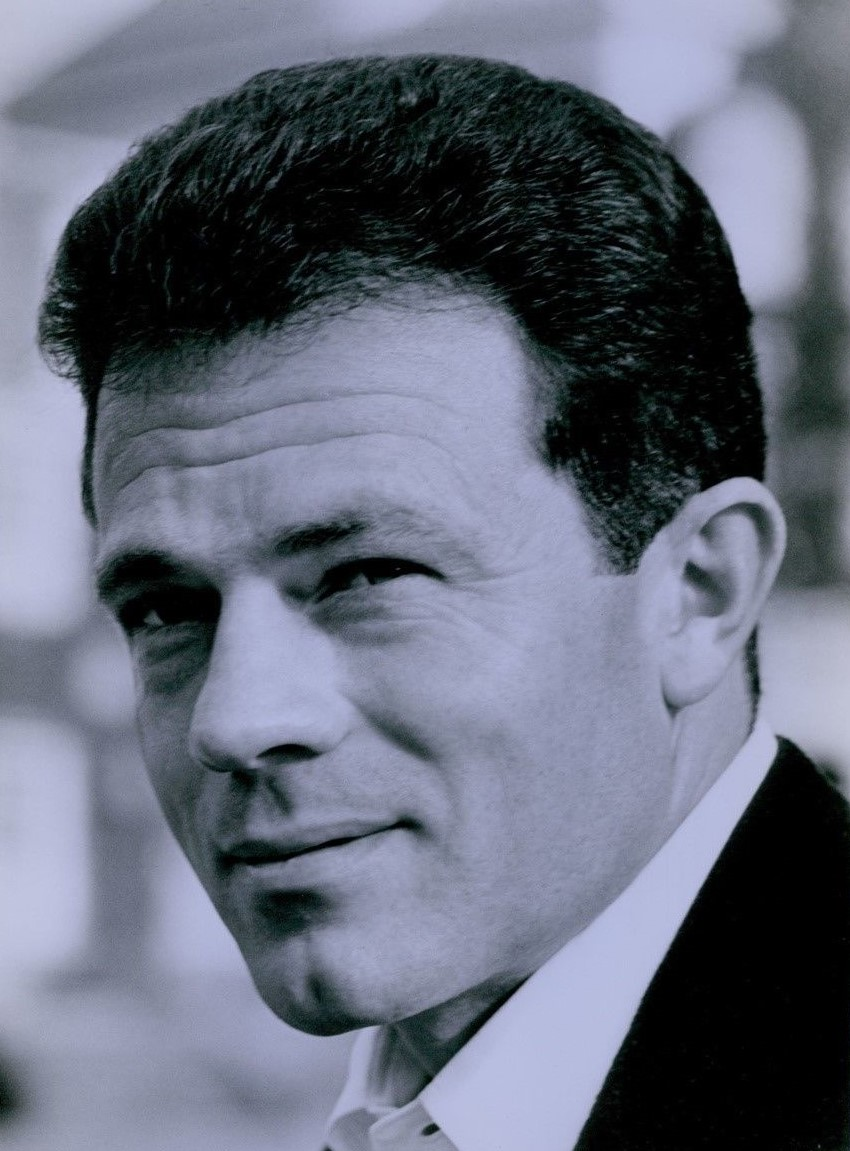
- Ging in a 1964 publicity photo
- Born: Jack Lee Ging; November 30, 1931; Alva, Oklahoma, U.S.
- Died: September 9, 2022 (aged 90); La Quinta, California, U.S.
- Education: University of Oklahoma
- Occupation: Actor
- Years active: 1958–1994
- Spouses: Katie Ging (m. 1952; div. 1954); Gretchen Graening (m. 1956; div. 1972); Ramona Ging (m. 1978)
- Children: 4

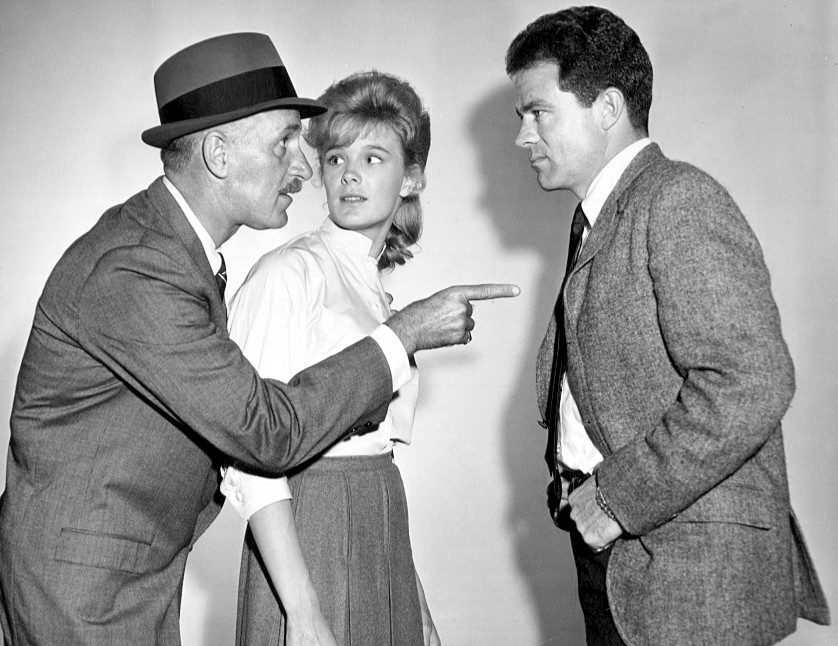
Keenan Wynn, Linda Evans, and Ging in an episode of TV's The Eleventh Hour (1963)

Jack Lee Ging (November 30, 1931 – September 9, 2022) was an American actor. He was best known as General Harlan "Bull" Fulbright on NBC's television adventure series The A-Team, and for his supporting role in the final season of Tales of Wells Fargo starring Dale Robertson.

== Early life ==
Born on November 30, 1931, in Alva, Oklahoma, Ging was the son of a couple who farmed on the outskirts of Alva, Oklahoma. Both sets of his grandparents were participants in the Cherokee Strip Land Run of 1893. When he was young, his parents divorced, and his mother began working as a "Harvey Girl". Although his mother had custody of him, her irregular hours as a waitress led to his living with relatives. Eventually, he settled with a family named Domenici while he attended a Catholic school. Later, he attended St. Michael's boarding school in Santa Fe, New Mexico. He left there when his mother became ill, resulting in their return to Oklahoma, where she lived with his grandmother while he lived with an aunt and uncle.

Before turning to acting, Ging served in the U.S. Marine Corps for four years and was honorably discharged. During the 1950s, he played college football at the University of Oklahoma, Norman. He scored five touchdowns during his time at Oklahoma and played in the 1954 Orange Bowl game.

== Career ==
Ging starred in the war film Sniper's Ridge (1961) and played Will Coleman in Where the Red Fern Grows (1974). Other film credits include Hang 'Em High (1968), Play Misty for Me (1971), and High Plains Drifter (1973), all opposite Clint Eastwood. He also appeared in the horror films Die Sister, Die! (1972) and Sssssss (1973), as well as the action film That Man Bolt (1973). He appeared in TV movies such as Terror in the Sky (1971) and The Disappearance of Flight 412 (1974).

Ging portrayed Dan Wright in NBC's The Man and the Challenge (1959–1960). He also starred in "Dead Men don't pay no debts", an episode of Bat Masterson, playing a small-town sheriff in love with a girl whose name is the same as the man he's sworn to kill. He portrayed a raider in eight episodes of the 1958–1959 syndicated western series Mackenzie's Raiders. Thereafter, he appeared as Beau McCloud in thirteen episodes in the last season of the NBC western series Tales of Wells Fargo.

In 1960, Ging appeared in one episode of The Twilight Zone, "The Whole Truth". He made three guest appearances on Perry Mason, including, in 1962, playing Danny Pierce in "The Case of the Lonely Eloper". From 1962 to 1964, he played a young psychiatrist in NBC's 62-episode medical drama The Eleventh Hour. In 1966 he played "Simon Dobbs", a blind ex-lawman trying to cope with his new affliction, on the episode "Stage Stop" (S12E10) on the TV Western Gunsmoke.

Ging had a recurring role as Lieutenant Dan Ives, one of many of Joe Mannix's Los Angeles Police Department contacts on Mannix from 1967 to 1975. Ging's other roles were on The Roaring 20s, The Six Million Dollar Man, The Bionic Woman, Wiseguy, B. J. and the Bear, The Winds of War, and War and Remembrance. In 1981, Ging played Tracy Winslow in the episode "My Heroes Have Always Been Cowboys" of ABC's The Greatest American Hero. From 1984 to 1985, Ging played the arrogant Lieutenant Ted Quinlan on the adventure/detective series Riptide; his character was killed off and he went on to appear on The A-Team, on which he made two guest appearances as villains. His roles as a regular on TV programs included that of Chuck Morris on the short-lived CBS crime drama Dear Detective and Admiral Conte on the NBC adventure series The Highwayman.

== Athletic accomplishments ==
In addition to his achievements in football during his college years, Ging played for one season with the Edmonton Eskimos of the Canadian Football League after he graduated. He also was a "Crosby golf tournament winner, [and a] Clint Eastwood Celebrity Tennis tournament champion."

== Personal life ==
Jack and Katie Ging married "right out of high school". After they divorced, he wed Gretchen Graening on April 19, 1956. They had one son and divorced in September 1973. On September 23, 1978, Ging married Sharon Ramona Thompson in Los Angeles. They had two daughters.

Ging died of natural causes at his home in La Quinta, California, on September 9, 2022, at the age of 90.

== Filmography ==
=== Film ===
Year	Title	Role	Notes
1958	Rally 'Round the Flag, Boys!	Hoxie's Driver	Uncredited
1959	Ghost of Dragstrip Hollow	Tony	
1960	Desire in the Dust	Peter Marquand	
1960	Tess of the Storm Country	Peter Graves	
1961	Sniper's Ridge	Private Sharack	
1966	Intimacy	Jim Hawley	
1967	Mosby's Marauders	Lt. John Singleton Mosby	
1968	Hang 'Em High	Marshal Ace Hayes	Uncredited
1971	Terror in the Sky	Controller	
1971	Play Misty for Me	Frank	
1972	Die Sister, Die!	Edward Price	Filmed in 1972, released in 1978
1973	High Plains Drifter	Morgan Allen	
1973	Sssssss	Sheriff Dale Hardison	
1973	That Man Bolt	Connie Mellis	
1974	Where the Red Fern Grows	Papa	
1974	The Disappearance of Flight 412	Green	
1977	Another Man, Another Chance	Preacher	Uncredited

=== Television ===
Year	Title	Role	Notes
1958–1959	Mackenzie's Raiders	Lieutenant / Lieutenant Sanders / Otis Matthews	8 episodes
1959	Wanted: Dead or Alive	Royer	Episode: "Bad Gun"
1959	Tales of Wells Fargo	Stacy	Episode: "Return of Doc Bell"
1959–1960	Bat Masterson	Clark Bassett / Billy Webb	2 episodes
1960–1962	Perry Mason	Robert Samuel Chapman / James Kincannon / Danny Pierce	3 episodes
1961	The Twilight Zone	Young Man	Episode: "The Whole Truth"
1961	Sea Hunt	Lou James	Episode: "Rescue"
1961	Tales of Wells Fargo	Beau McCloud	13 episodes
1961	Alfred Hitchcock Presents	Detective Joe Parks	Season 7 Episode 4: "Keep Me Company"
1962–1964	The Eleventh Hour	Dr. Paul Graham	59 episodes Ging was a regular in season 1 of 2 seasons
1963	Dr. Kildare	Dr. Paul Graham	Episode: "Four Feet in the Morning"
1966	Gunsmoke	Simon Dobbs	Season 12, Episode 10: "Stage Stop"
1967	Walt Disney's Wonderful World of Color	Lieutenant John Singleton Mosby	2 episodes: "Willie and the Yank: The Deserter", "Willie and the Yank: The Mosby Raiders"
1968	Mannix	James Spencer	Episode: "The End of the Rainbow"
1970–1974	Mannix	Lieutenant Dan Ives	7 episodes
1974–1979	Barnaby Jones	Various roles	4 episodes
1975, 1977	Kojak	Leo Becker / Hackford	2 episodes
1978	Fantasy Island	Sergeant Gus Fallon	Episode: "Trouble, My Lovely / The Common Man"
1978	Starsky & Hutch	Ray Pardee	Episode: "The Game"
1979	B. J. and the Bear	Inspector / Treasury Agent Paul Mason	2 episodes
1979	Dear Detective	Detective Chuck Morris	4 episodes
1980	The Misadventures of Sheriff Lobo	Dr. Richard Peterson	Episode: "First to Finish, Last to Show"
1980	Galactica 1980	Captain Bannister	Episode: "The Super Scouts"
1980	Hart to Hart	Drew Kendall	Episode: "What Murder?"
1981	Quincy, M.E.	Mickey Langford	Episode: "Dead Stop"
1981	The Greatest American Hero	Lieutenant Tracy Winslow	Episode: "My Heroes Have Always Been Cowboys"
1982	The Fall Guy	Johnson	Episode: "How Do I Kill Thee... Let Me Count the Ways"
1983	The Winds of War	Destroyer Commander Baldwin	Episode: "The Changing of the Guard"
1983	The A-Team	SWAT Captain Stark / Border Patrol Lieutenant Taggart	2 episodes
1984–1985	Riptide	Lieutenant Ted Quinlan	31 episodes
1985–1986	The A-Team	General Harlan 'Bull' Fulbright	6 episodes
1986	Highway to Heaven	Michael Gunn	Episode: "Code Name: FREAK"
1988	War and Remembrance	Commander William Buracker	Episode: "Part III"
1991–1992	P.S. I Luv U	Chief Hollings	6 episodes
1994	Wings	Coach Dan Mattay	Episode: "Boys Will Be Girls", (final appearance)
2005	Bring Back The A Team	Himself	1 Episode.
