= Hugo Friedhofer =

American composer (1901–1981)

- Born: Hugo Wilhelm Friedhofer; May 3, 1901; San Francisco, California, U.S.
- Died: May 17, 1981 (aged 80) Los Angeles, California, U.S.
- Genres: Film score; contemporary classical
- Occupations: Composer, arranger
- Instrument: Cello

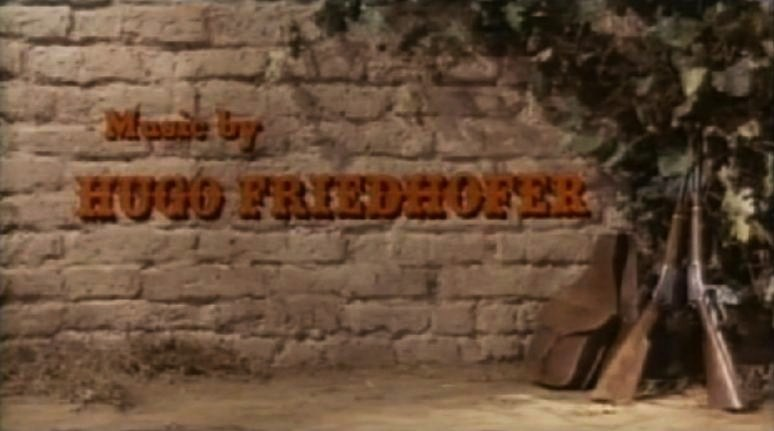
One-Eyed Jacks - main title

Hugo Wilhelm Friedhofer (May 3, 1901 – May 17, 1981) was an American composer and cellist, known for his film scores. He won an Academy Award for Best Original Score for The Best Years of Our Lives (1946), out of nine total nominations.

== Biography ==
Hugo Wilhelm Friedhofer was born in San Francisco, California, United States. His father, Paul, was a cellist trained in Dresden, Germany; his mother, Eva König, was born in Germany.

Friedhofer began playing cello at the age of 13. After taking lessons in harmony and counterpoint at University of California, Berkeley, he was employed as a cellist for the People's Symphony Orchestra.

In 1929, he relocated to Hollywood, where he performed as a musician for Fox Studios productions such as Sunny Side Up (1929) and Grand Canary (1934). Later, he was hired as an orchestrator for Warner Bros. and worked on more than 50 films for the studio. While at Warners he was largely assigned to work with Max Steiner and, because he could speak German, Erich Wolfgang Korngold. Steiner, in particular, relied on Friedhofer's skill in turning his sketches into a full orchestral score.

In 1937, Friedhofer composed his first full-length film score, The Adventures of Marco Polo. Though he was still employed as an orchestrator through the 1930s and into the 1940s, he gradually received more assignments as a composer. In 1942, he composed the score for the film Chetniks! The Fighting Guerrillas.

In 1946, Friedhofer was hired to compose the score for the 1946 William Wyler directed film, The Best Years of Our Lives, which earned him an Oscar for Best Original Score at the 1947 Academy Awards, beating Bernard Herrmann, Miklós Rózsa, William Walton and Franz Waxman. A new recording of the score, released in 1979 by Entr'acte Recording Society, was favorably received at the time.

Friedhofer was also nominated for eight other films, including The Woman in the Window, The Bishop's Wife, Joan of Arc, Above and Beyond, Between Heaven and Hell, Boy on a Dolphin and An Affair to Remember (both nominated in 1958), as well as The Young Lions.

Friedhofer, who was greatly admired by his colleagues, was also noted for his caustic, self-deprecating wit. When asked by fellow composer David Raksin as to the progress he was making on his score for Joan of Arc, he replied, "I've just started on the barbecue!". When asked, in a 1975 profile/interview penned by lyricist Gene Lees, to evaluate his place in the pantheon of film musicians, Friedhofer quipped, "I am just a fake giant among real pygmies." (Note: In the interests of giving credit where credit is due, Friedhofer—though unable to recall to whom in fact credit was due—made a point of promptly informing Lee that he did not coin the "fake giant ... real pygmies" quip. To that question, the quote that appears to be Friedhofer's inspiration—literally, "a sham giant surrounded by real pygmies"—was attributed posthumously in December 1938 to the then-recently departed Arthur W. Ryder by Ryder's fellow UC Berkeley faculty member, poet Leonard Bacon, in Part II of the latter's 6-page remembrance of his Berkeley tenure, published in Harper's Magazine.)

A biographical collection of essays, letters and interviews has been edited by Linda Danly.

He died at St. Vincent Hospital from complications of a fall on May 17, 1981.

== Film and television work ==
Friedhofer wrote music for 256 movies, shorts or television episodes without credit — as a music department composer of themes, additional music, stock music, incidental music or background music. He composed as a primary composer, both credited and uncredited, for 166 movies, shorts or television episodes.

== Films ==
- The Dancers (1930)
- Heartbreak (1931)
- Orient Express (1934)
- The Adventures of Marco Polo (1938)
- The Adventures of Robin Hood (1938)
- Topper Takes a Trip (1938)
- China Girl (1942)
- Chetniks! The Fighting Guerrillas (1943)
- They Came to Blow Up America (1943)
- Paris After Dark (1943)
- Lifeboat (1944)
- The Lodger (1944)
- Roger Touhy, Gangster (1944)
- Home in Indiana (1944)
- Wing and a Prayer (1944)
- The Bandit of Sherwood Forest (1946)
- So Dark the Night (1946)
- The Best Years of Our Lives (1946)
- Body and Soul (1947)
- Wild Harvest (1947)
- The Bishop's Wife (1947)
- The Swordsman (1948)
- Adventures of Casanova (1948)
- Enchantment (1948)
- Joan of Arc (1948)
- Sealed Verdict (1948)
- Bride of Vengeance (1949)
- Guilty of Treason (1950)
- The Sound of Fury (1950)
- Two Flags West (1950)
- Edge of Doom (1950)
- Broken Arrow (1950)
- Captain Carey, U.S.A. (1950)
- No Man of Her Own (1950)
- Three Came Home (1950)
- Queen for a Day (1951)
- Ace in the Hole (1951)
- The Marrying Kind (1952)
- The Outcasts of Poker Flat (1952)
- Lydia Bailey (1952)
- Above and Beyond (1952)
- Thunder in the East (1952)
- Man in the Attic (1953)
- Hondo (1953)
- Vera Cruz (1954)
- The Rains of Ranchipur (1955)
- Seven Cities of Gold (1955)
- Soldier of Fortune (1955)
- Violent Saturday (1955)
- White Feather (1955)
- Between Heaven and Hell (1956)
- The Revolt of Mamie Stover (1956)
- The Harder They Fall (1956)
- The Sun Also Rises (1957)
- An Affair to Remember (1957)
- Boy on a Dolphin (1957)
- The Young Lions (1958)
- In Love and War (1958)
- The Barbarian and the Geisha (1958)
- Never So Few (1959)
- The Blue Angel (1959)
- This Earth Is Mine (1959)
- Woman Obsessed (1959)
- Homicidal (1961)
- One-Eyed Jacks (1961)
- Beauty and the Beast (1962)
- Geronimo (1962)
- The Secret Invasion (1964)
- The Over-the-Hill Gang (1969)
- Von Richthofen and Brown (1971)
- Die Sister, Die! (1972)
- Private Parts (1972)

== Television ==
- Outlaws (1960–61) (episodes for TV series)
- Empire (1962) (TV series)
- Voyage to the Bottom of the Sea (1964) (episodes for TV series)
- The Guns of Will Sonnett (1967) (episodes for TV series)
- I Spy (1966–68) (episodes for TV series)
- Lancer (1968–69) (episodes for TV series)
- My Friend Tony (1969) (episode for TV series)
- The F.B.I. (1970) (episode for TV series)
- Barnaby Jones (1973–78) (episodes for TV series)
- Psychette: William Castle and 'Homicidal' (2002) (video short released after Friedhofer's death)

== See also ==
- Max Steiner filmography for notes on Steiner scores Friedhofer orchestrated
