= John Goddard (actor) =

American film and television actor

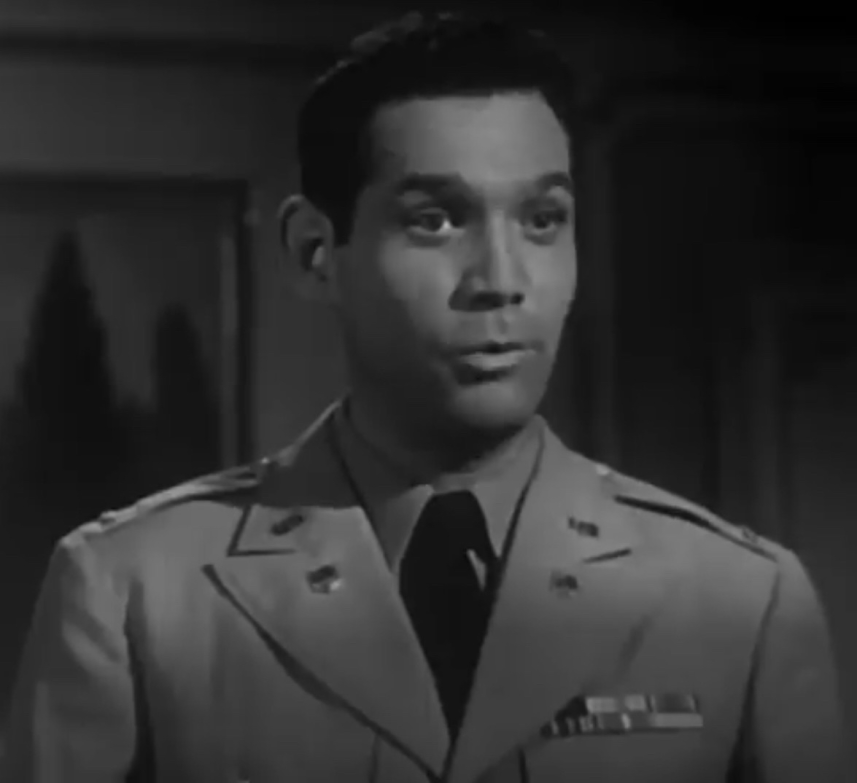
- Goddard in Man with a Camera, 1960
- Born: August 28, 1927 (age 99); United States
- Occupations: Film and television actor
- Years active: 1952–1993

John Goddard (born August 28, 1927) is an American film and television actor.

== Life and career ==
Goddard was born in the United States. He began his screen career in 1952, appearing in the NBC crime anthology television series Gangbusters. The next year, he appeared in the film The Kid from Left Field.

Later in his career, in 1959, Goddard was offered the role of Adam Cartwright in the NBC western television series Bonanza, but he turned it down to star along with Read Morgan in the television series Johnny Fletcher; it was not picked up. He guest-starred in numerous television programs including The Rifleman, The Life and Legend of Wyatt Earp, M Squad, Cimarron City, Dragnet, 77 Sunset Strip, Tales of Wells Fargo, Voyage to the Bottom of the Sea, Perry Mason and Wagon Train. He also appeared in films such as The Storm Rider (as Harry Rorick), Sniper's Ridge (as Captain Tombolo), Not as a Stranger, A Bullet for Joey, Twenty Plus Two, The Impossible Years and Gun Fever.

Goddard retired from acting in 1993, last appearing in the film When the Party's Over.
