= Michael Barrier (actor) =

American film and television actor

- Barrier in Mission: Impossible, 1966
- Born: Michael Geoffrey Barrier; July 8, 1933; New York, U.S.
- Died: February 26, 2024 (aged 90); Pembroke Pines, Florida, U.S.
- Occupations: Film and television actor

Michael Geoffrey Barrier (July 8, 1933 – February 26, 2024) was an American film and television actor. He was best known for playing the recurring role of Lieutenant DeSalle in the first and second season of the American science fiction television series Star Trek.

== Life and career ==
Barrier was born in New York. He began his screen career in 1960, appearing in the ABC legal drama television series The Law and Mr. Jones. In the same year, he appeared in the ABC western television series The Rebel.

Later in his career, Barrier guest-starred in television programs including Gunsmoke, Bonanza, The Untouchables, 12 O'Clock High, Voyage to the Bottom of the Sea and Mission: Impossible, and played the recurring role of Lieutenant DeSalle in the first and second season of the NBC science fiction television series Star Trek. In 1965, he played an uncredited role in the film The Satan Bug. Aside from acting, he taught drama at Glendale High School.

Barrier retired from acting in 1969, last appearing in the film Angel in My Pocket. After retiring from acting, he worked as a law instructor in the department of nautical science and law at the United States Coast Guard Academy.

== Death ==
Barrier died on February 26, 2024, in Pembroke Pines, Florida, at the age of 90.
