= The Underpants =

Play of 2002 by Steve Martin, adapted from Die Hose by Sternheim

- Original language: English
- Written by: Steve Martin
- Subject: Die Hose by Carl Sternheim

Premiere
- Date: April 4, 2002
- Place: Classic Stage Company

The Underpants is the most recent adaptation of the 1910 German farce Die Hose by the playwright Carl Sternheim. The adaptation was written by Steve Martin. It was produced at New York City's Off-Broadway theater Classic Stage Company from April 4, 2002 through April 28, 2002. The play, a "farcical send-up of bourgeois snobbery and conformity" was directed by Barry Edelstein and featured Cheryl Lynn Bowers and Byron Jennings as Louise and Theo Maske.

== Other productions ==
The play has been produced at the Geffen Playhouse in Los Angeles (March - April 2004) and at the Arden Theatre in Philadelphia (September - October 2004. More recent productions include:

- Brüka Theatre (Reno, Nevada), November 11, 2005 - February 4, 2006, directed by Brian Barney.
- Showcase Theatre, Exeter, Pa. 2005
- Alley_Theatre, Houston, April 1–24, 2005
- The Old Red Lion, Islington, London, UK, October 24 - November 18, 2006, directed by Richard Braine
- University of Northern Iowa, Cedar Falls, Iowa, June 6–8, 2008, directed by Jay Edelnant
- Langhorne Players, Newtown, PA, April 17 - May 2, 2009, directed by Alice Weber
- University of Adelaide Theatre Guild, Adelaide, Australia, May 9–23, 2009 directed by John Wells
- First Presbyterian Theater, Fort Wayne, Indiana, June 4–20, 2009, directed by Joel D. Scribner
- Princeton Summer Theater, Princeton, New Jersey, August 6–16, 2009, directed by Shawn Fennell
- Rockford College, Artists' Ensemble Theatre, Rockford, Illinois, September 9–26, 2011, directed by Richard Raether
- Shore School Drama Studio, Sydney, Australia, November 18–21, 2009, directed by Rachel Blake
- The University of Scranton Players - December 3–6, 2009
- The University of Mississippi, Oxford, Mississippi, USA, February 16–21, 2009, directed by Rory Ledbetter.
- Dearborn Heights Civic Theater, Dearborn Heights, Michigan- February 20–22 + 26-27 2010, directed by Cynthia Frabutt http://www.dhctstage.org/
- Penobscot Theatre Company, Bangor, Maine, USA, May 26 - June 30, 2010, directed by Nathan Halvorson
- The Richard Stockton College of New Jersey, Galloway Township, New Jersey—November 17–20, 2010, directed by Pamela Hendrick
- Chung Ying Theatre Company, Hong Kong, April 1–10, 2011, directed by Gabriel Lee http://www.chungying.com
- Salem State University, Salem, Massachusetts—Spring 2011, directed by Britt Mitchell, assistant directed by Emily Laverdiere and Kevin Murphy Walunas
- Pentacle Theatre, Salem, Oregon, July 15-August 6, 2011, directed by Jenni Bertels
- National Institute of Dramatic Art, Sydney, Australia, 22 - 25, 27 June 2011, directed by Craig Ilott
- McPherson College, McPherson, Kansas, October 2011, directed by Jd. Bowman
- Waterloo Community Playhouse, Waterloo, Iowa, May 11–19, 2012, directed by Charles Stilwill
- Los Medanos College, Pittsburg, California, March, 6 - 9, 11, 13 - 15, 2013, directed by Nick Garcia
- Florida Studio Theatre, Sarasota, Florida, June 26 - July 28, 2013, directed by Bruce Jordan
- Epic Shit Entertainment, New Delhi, India, February 14–24, 2013, adapted and directed by Madhav Mehta
- Hartford Stage, Hartford, Connecticut, January 9 - February 9, 2014, directed by Gordon Edelstein
- Syracuse Stage, Syracuse, New York, October 21 - November 8, 2015, directed by Bill Fennelly
- The Collective Face Theatre Ensemble, Savannah, Georgia, December 4–20, 2015
- Acrosstown Repertory Theatre, Gainesville, Florida, June 3–19, 2016, directed by Jessica Arnold.
- Fauquier Community Theater, Warrenton, VA, January 27-February 12, 2017, directed by Scott J. Strasbaugh.
- American Repertory Theater of Western New York, Buffalo, NY, March 9 - April 1, 2017, directed by Jeff Coyle.
- The University of Wisconsin, Madison, WI, April 13-April 30, 2017, directed by Scott Cummins.
- Armstrong State University, Savannah, GA, July 13–16, 2017, Masquers Performance Directed by Geoffrey Douglas
- Temple University, Philadelphia, PA, December 2017
- Murray State University, Murray, KY, April 25–28, 2019, directed by Matthew Crider
- Bergen County Players, Oradell, NJ, May 14–22, 2022
- Sonnentag Theatre at the Ice House, Mount Dora, FL, May 12 - June 4, 2023
- The Winston-Salem Little Theatre, Winston-Salem, NC, Sept 15-24, 2023
- Nevada Conservatory Theatre, University of Nevada, Las Vegas, October 2025
- Clayton State University, Morrow, GA, October 2026
