= Amzie Strickland filmography =

This is the complete filmography of actress Amzie Strickland (January 10, 1919 – July 5, 2006).

== 1930s ==
Year	Title	Role	Notes
1937	You Only Live Once	Young Woman	Uncredited
1937	History Is Made at Night	Restaurant Patron	Uncredited
1937	The Toast of New York	Minor Role	Uncredited
1937	Ali Baba Goes to Town	Harem Girl	Uncredited
1937	Hollywood Hotel	Guest at Orchid Room	Uncredited
1937	Wise Girl	Minor Role	Uncredited
1938	The Big Broadcast of 1938	Chorus Girl	Uncredited
1938	Paradise for Three	Hotel Guest	Uncredited
1938	Jezebel	Woman at the Olympus Ball	Uncredited
1938	Bluebeard's Eighth Wife	Minor Role	Uncredited
1938	Wives Under Suspicion	Lady in Courtroom	Uncredited
1938	The Amazing Dr. Clitterhouse	Patient	Uncredited
1938	My Lucky Star	Dancer / Skater	Uncredited
1938	There Goes My Heart	Customer	Uncredited
1938	Artists and Models Abroad	Girl	Uncredited
1938	Sweethearts	Chorus Girl	Uncredited
1939	The Little Princess	Nurse	Uncredited
1939	Broadway Serenade	Girl at Party	Uncredited
1939	Dark Victory	Judith's Friend	Uncredited
1939	Calling Dr. Kildare	Patient	Uncredited
1939	Bachelor Mother	Minor Role	Uncredited
1939	Stronger Than Desire	Flagg's Party Guest	Uncredited
1939	Hotel for Women	Model	Uncredited
1939	The Women	Glamour Girl	Uncredited
1939	The Roaring Twenties	Nightclub Patron	Uncredited
1939	First Love	Ball Guest	Uncredited
1939	The Cisco Kid and the Lady	Saloon Girl	Uncredited

== 1940s ==
Year	Title	Role	Notes
1940	He Married His Wife	Nightclub Patron	Uncredited
1940	And One Was Beautiful	Girl at Party	Uncredited
1940	Brother Orchid	Girl	Uncredited
1940	Arise, My Love	Girl at Maxim's	Uncredited
1941	The Devil and Miss Jones	Shopper at Neeley's	Uncredited
1941	Ziegfeld Girl	Ziegfeld Girl	Uncredited
1941	Sunny	Minor Role	Uncredited
1941	Blossoms in the Dust	Guest at Second Party	Uncredited
1941	Hold That Ghost	Nightclub Patron	Uncredited
1941	I Wake Up Screaming	Girl at Table	Uncredited
1941	Unholy Partners	Girl at Party	Uncredited
1941	Melody Lane	Carnival Recording Booth Woman	Uncredited
1942	Holiday Inn	Girl	Uncredited
1942	The Gay Sisters	Courtroom Spectator	Uncredited
1942	I Married a Witch	Girl at Country Club	Uncredited
1942	Arabian Nights	Harem Girl	Uncredited
1943	Forever and a Day	WAAC Girl	Uncredited
1943	Mr. Lucky	War Relief Worker	Uncredited
1943	Coney Island	Dancer	Uncredited
1943	Princess O'Rourke	Hotel Guest	Uncredited
1944	The Story of Dr. Wassell	Native Woman	Uncredited
1944	Bathing Beauty	Showgirl	Uncredited
1945	Tonight and Every Night	Showgirl	Uncredited
1945	Thrill of a Romance	Hotel Guest	Uncredited
1945	The Bourgeois Gentleman		TV movie, Uncredited
1945	Week-End at the Waldorf	Hotel Guest	Uncredited
1945	Bud Abbott and Lou Costello in Hollywood	Nightclub Patron	Uncredited
1945	Scarlet Street	Woman	Uncredited
1946	Tomorrow Is Forever	Ship Passenger	Uncredited
1946	The Strange Love of Martha Ivers	Nightclub Patron	Uncredited
1946	The Locket	Wedding Guest	Uncredited
1947	Life with Father	Churchgoer	Uncredited
1947	Song of the Thin Man	Nightclub Patron	Uncredited
1947	Gentleman's Agreement	Guest at Anne's Party	Uncredited
1947	My Wild Irish Rose	Diner at White Horse Tavern	Uncredited
1948	You Were Meant for Me	Minor Role	Uncredited
1948	The Sainted Sisters	Townswoman	Uncredited
1948	The Velvet Touch	Minor Role	Uncredited
1948	Hollow Triumph	Hotel Guest	Uncredited
1948	Night Has a Thousand Eyes	Secretary	Uncredited
1948	Sorry, Wrong Number	Dance Team Member	Uncredited
1948	Moonrise	Minor Role	Uncredited
1948	June Bride	Airline Passenger	Uncredited
1948	Portrait of Jennie	Ice Skating Extra	Uncredited
1949	The Barkleys of Broadway	Theatre Lobby Guest	Uncredited
1949	Easy Living	Party Guest	Uncredited

== 1950s ==
Year	Title	Role	Notes
1950	Nancy Goes to Rio	Party Guest	Uncredited
1950	Caged	Inmate	Uncredited
1950	711 Ocean Drive	Dame at Boxing Match	Uncredited
1950	The Fuller Brush Girl	Dancer	Uncredited
1951	Royal Wedding	Dancer in Haiti Number	Uncredited
1951	I Can Get It for You Wholesale	Restaurant Patron	Uncredited
1951	Angels in the Outfield	Steakhouse Patron	Uncredited
1952	A Girl in Every Port	Hotel Guest	Uncredited
1952	No Room for the Groom	Relative	Uncredited
1952	Young Man with Ideas	Party Guest	Uncredited
1952	Sudden Fear	Reception Guest	Uncredited
1952	The Jazz Singer	Woman in Synagogue	Uncredited
1953	Angel Face	Woman	Uncredited
1953	The Blue Gardenia	Woman at Bar	Uncredited
1953	Glen or Glenda	Minor Role	Uncredited
1954	Drive a Crooked Road	Minor Role	Uncredited
1954	Magnificent Obsession	Luncheon Guest	Uncredited
1954	Woman's World	Woman in Bargain Basement	Uncredited
1954	The Silver Chalice	Audience Member	Uncredited
1955	Medic	Miss Walker	Episode: "A Time to Be Alive"
1955	Treasury Men in Action	Kay Randall	Episode: "The Case of the Princely Pauper"
1955	I Love Lucy	Amzie the Salesgirl	Episode: "The Fashion Show"
1955	The Man Behind the Badge	Betty / Fay	2 episodes
1955	Climax!	Jane	Episode: "Night of Execution"
1955	Jane Wyman Presents The Fireside Theatre	Edie	Episode: "One Last September"
1955	Man with the Gun	Mary Atkins	Uncredited
1955-1956	Matinee Theatre	Sarah / Daughter-in-law	3 episodes
1955-1958	Dragnet	Elma Face / Mrs. Anita Spencer / Sylvania Carnes / Barbara Fleischer	4 episodes
1955-1970	Gunsmoke	Minnie Carver / Mrs. Hewitt / Mrs. Brant / Lennie Hinton	4 episodes
1956	Celebrity Playhouse	Helen Dean	Episode: "More Than Kin"
1956	Behind the High Wall	Mrs. Baynar	Uncredited
1956	The Girl He Left Behind	Women's Club Member	Uncredited
1956	The Loretta Young Show	Gladys	Episode: "Somebody Else's Dream"
1956-1958	The Millionaire	Amy Taylor / Miss Cross / Donna McKeever	3 episodes
1957	Drango	Mrs. George Randolph	
1957	Battle Hymn	Mrs. Peterson	Uncredited
1957	State Trooper	Delia Gilbert (as Anzie Strickland)	Episode: "Who Killed Doc. Robbins"
1957	Bernardine	Woman at Phone Co. counter	Uncredited
1957	Slaughter on 10th Avenue	Mrs. Cavanagh	
1957	House of Numbers	Saleswoman	Uncredited
1957	The Court of Last Resort	Marion	Episode: "The Gordon Wallace Case"
1957	The Thin Man	Librarian	Episode: "Come Back Darling Asta"
1957	The Adventures of Jim Bowie	Denise Martel	Episode: "Charivari"
1957	The Pied Piper of Hamelin	Leading Townswoman	TV movie, Uncredited
1957	December Bride	Marilyn	Episode: "Matt's Gray Hair"
1958	Zorro	Dona Inez Montes	Uncredited, Episode: "Sweet Face of Danger"
1958	M Squad	Kate Larson	Episode: "The Chicago Bluebeard"
1958	The Restless Gun	Elvira Peebles	Episode: "The Crisis at Easter Creek"
1958	Trackdown	Madge Roberts	Episode: "The Governor"
1958	Goodyear Theatre	Claire Lane	Episode: "Decision by Terror"
1958	Flight		Episode: "Master Sergeant"
1958	Zane Grey Theater	Mae Jones	Episode: "The Vaunted"
1958-1962	Make Room for Daddy	Various Roles	8 episodes
1958-1964	Wagon Train	Mrs. Lowell / Mrs. West / Minnie Hershey / Agnes Montgomery / Arletta Hoag / Martha	6 episodes
1959	Black Saddle	Polly Banks	Episode: "Client: Banks"
1959	Rawhide	Bess Hargrove	Episode: "Incident of Fear in the Streets"
1959	Curse of the Undead	Frank's Wife	Uncredited
1959	The Detectives	Eddie's Mother	Episode: "Back-Seat Driver"

== 1960s ==
Year	Title	Role	Notes
1960	The Bramble Bush	Mrs. Brendel	Uncredited
1960	The Twilight Zone	Woman	Episode: "The Monsters Are Due on Maple Street"
1960	This Man Dawson		Episode: "Get Dawson"
1960	Sea Hunt	Nurse Hawkins	Episode "Cindy"
1960	The Chevy Mystery Show	The Landlady	Episode: "The Machine Calls It Murder"
1960	Full Circle	Beth Pearce / Beth Perce	2 episodes
1960	One Step Beyond	Miss Welles / Agatha Dunlap	2 episodes
1960-1965	The Andy Griffith Show	Myra Tucker / Myra Tucker / Lila Sims / Mrs. Ralph Campbell / Miss Rosemary	5 episodes
1961	Leave It to Beaver	Woman who pays Beaver $5 to mow her lawn	Episode: "Beaver Goes in Business"
1961	The Real McCoys	Annabelle Keller	Episode: "The Trailer Camp"
1961	Perry Mason	Miss Clara Prentice	Episode: "The Case of the Left-Handed Liar"
1961-1962	The Dick Powell Theatre	Miss Talbot / Mrs. Mason	2 episodes
1962	The Joey Bishop Show	Mrs. Vincent - Juror	Episode: "Jury Duty"
1962	Room for One More	Mrs. Bailey	Episode: "Son of a Boss"
1962	Our Man Higgins	Maude	Episode: "A Servant of the People"
1962	It's a Man's World	Mrs. Hoff	Episode: "The Beavers and the Otters"
1962	Emergency Hospital	Clancy	TV movie
1962-1963	Bonanza	Lady in audience / Mary Clarke	2 episodes
1963	FBI Code 98	Maid	TV movie, Uncredited
1963	The Untouchables	Maid	Episode: "The Butcher's Boy"
1963	The Virginian	Ruth Arlen	Episode: "The Mountain of the Sun"
1963	Captain Newman, M.D.	Katie - Ward 3 Nurse	Uncredited
1963-1964	The Bill Dana Show	Mrs. Phillips / Mrs. Harris	12 episodes
1963-1965	The Dick Van Dyke Show	Various Roles	7 episodes
1963-1965	The Adventures of Ozzie and Harriet	Mrs. Tyler / Editor Woman's Page / Woman / Lady (Martha)	4 episodes
1964	Burke's Law	Cadet Leader	Episode: "Who Killed Carrie Cornell?"
1964	Wendy and Me	Mary Jo	Episode: "Wendy's Anniversary for --?"
1965	Peyton Place	Lucy Frisby	Episode #1.41, Uncredited
1965	My Favorite Martian	Jenny Holbrook	Episode: "The Martian's Fair Hobo"
1965	The Farmer's Daughter	Marianne Rogers	Episode: "Here Comes the Bride's Father"
1965	The Fugitive	Mrs. Crandall	Episode: "An Apple a Day"
1965	Hank	Mrs. Harry Wallace	Episode: "My Boyfriend, the Doctor"
1965	The Patty Duke Show	Richard's Mother	Episode: "Patty and the Eternal Triangle"
1966	The F.B.I.	Deputy Clerk #2	Episode: "The Chameleon"
1966	The Lucy Show	Salesgirl	Episode: "Lucy Bags a Bargain"
1966	The Donna Reed Show	Mrs. Grayson	Episode: "Calling Willie Mays"
1966	Gomer Pyle: USMC	Miss Sims, The Governess	Episode: "Little Girl Blue"
1966	The Danny Kaye Show	Betty Simpson	Episode #3.26
1966	Death Valley Days	Laticia Daigle / Martha Hall	2 episodes
1966	Penelope	Miss Serena	
1967	The Big Valley	Beanie	Episode: "Down Shadow Street"
1967	F Troop	Emily Barker	Episode: "Is This Fort Really Necessary?"
1967	The Road West	Anna Grimmer	Episode: "Elizabeth's Odyssey"
1967	Cimarron Strip	Mrs. Andrews	Episode: "The Search"
1967	Judd for the Defense	Mrs. Lynch	Episode: "The Money Farm"
1967-1970	That Girl	Ella Tansy / Mrs. Chatsworth	2 episodes
1968-1975	Adam-12	Mrs. Alltoff / Agatha Zephyr	2 episodes
1968	It Takes a Thief	Saleswoman	Episode: "When Thieves Fall In"
1968	My Three Sons	Cora Dennis	Episode: "Casanova O'Casey"
1968-1969	Dragnet	Amanda Tucker / Thelma Wade	2 episodes
1968-1969	Petticoat Junction	Gwendolyn Tucker / Mrs. Finch	2 episodes
1969	The Bold Ones: The New Doctors	Head Nurse	Uncredited, Episode: "The Rebellion of the Body"
1969	The Doris Day Show	Mrs. Fletcher	Episode: "The Chocolate Bar War"
1969	Silent Night, Lonely Night	Saleswoman	TV movie
1969	Mod Squad	Ellie	Episode: "Never Give the Fuzz an Even Break"
1969	Then Came Bronson	Mary	Episode: "Sibyl"
1969-1973	Ironside	Rita Logan / Landlady / Dorothy Barnes / Roberta O'Gorman	4 episodes

== 1970s ==
Year	Title	Role	Notes
1970	The Cockeyed Cowboys of Calico County	Hotel desk clerk	Uncredited
1970	Nancy	Mrs. Drew	Episode: "Boys' Night Out"
1970	The Bold Ones: The Lawyers	Mrs. Pryor	Episode: "The Loneliness Racket"
1971	Dan August	Hilda Jackson	Episode: "Bullet for a Hero"
1971	Kotch	Nurse Barons	
1971	Alias Smith and Jones	Various Roles	
1971-1977	Insight	Katherine / Mrs. Roche / Betty Hertzig	3 episodes
1972	The Rookies	Head Nurse	2 episodes
1973	Mission: Impossible	Mildred	Episode: "Boomerang"
1974	Apple's Way	Mrs. Moore	Episode: "The Applicant"
1974	Happy Days	Mrs. Finley	Episode: "The Best Man"
1974	The Story of Pretty Boy Floyd	Farm Woman	TV movie
1974	Death Cruise	Lynn	TV movie
1974-1976	Barnaby Jones	Mrs. Morrison / Mrs. Loomis	2 episodes
1975	Lucas Tanner	Mrs. Jernigan	Episode: "Those Who Cannot, Teach"
1975	The Legend of Lizzie Borden	Adelaide Churchill	TV movie
1975	The Six Million Dollar Man	Little Old Lady	Episode: "Steve Austin, Fugitive"
1976	ABC Saturday Comedy Special	Mrs. Lodge	Episode: "Archie"
1976	Widow	Matty	TV movie
1976	The Streets of San Francisco	Alma Drake	Episode: "Alien Country"
1976	Brinks: The Great Robbery	Neighbor lady	TV movie
1976	Jeremiah of Jacob's Neck	Abby Penrose	TV movie
1976-1978	The Bob Newhart Show	Bakerman Character / Mrs. Walhauser	2 episodes
1978	The One and Only	House Mother	
1978	The Waltons	Courthouse Clerk	Episode: "The Family Tree"
1978	Project U.F.O.	Sister Anne	Episode: "Sighting 4013: The St. Hilary Incident"
1978	Harper Valley PTA	Shirley Thompson	
1978	The New Adventures of Heidi	Cousin Martha	TV movie
1978-1979	Carter Country	Julia Mobey	6 episodes

== 1980s ==
Year	Title	Role	Notes
1980	Dan August: Murder, My Friend	Hilda Jackson	TV movie
1980	Flo	Betty	Episode: "Happy Birthday, Mama"
1981	A Matter of Life and Death	Nellie Norris	TV movie
1981	Three's Company	Gladys Moore	Episode: "Jack's Other Mother"
1981	A Few Days in Weasel Creek	Mrs. Stayvey	TV movie
1982	Father Murphy	Ruby Dobbins	Episode: "Graduation"
1982	The Facts of Life	Marie Thornwell	Episode: "The Oldest Living Graduate"
1982	Falcon Crest	Woman on Bus	Episode: "The Vigil"
1983	The Jeffersons	Lillian Warren	Episode: "My Girl, Louise"
1983	Knight Rider	Martha Haberstraw	Episode: "A Nice, Indecent Little Town"
1984	Finder of Lost Loves	Mrs. Hawthorne	Episode: "Goodbye, Sara"
1985	The Twilight Zone	Cleaning Woman	Episode: "Night of the Meek/But Can She Type?/The Star" (segment "But Can She Type?")
1986	The Golden Girls	Lady at Funeral	Episode: "It's a Miserable Life"
1987-1988	It's Garry Shandling's Show	Ma Schumaker	2 episodes
1987	My Sister Sam	Virginia Schultz	Episode: "Who's Afraid of Virginia Schultz?"
1987	St. Elsewhere	Rae Mills	Episode: "Weigh In, Way Out"
1988	Annie McGuire	Mrs. Henshaw	Episode: "The Legend of the Bad Fish"
1989	Murphy Brown	Mrs. Myrna Bickner	Episode: "The Bickners"

== 1990s to 2000s ==
Year	Title	Role	Notes
1990	Big Bad John	Nellie	
1990	ALF	Rebecca	Episode: "When I'm 64"
1990	Pretty Woman	Opera Matron	
1990	Father Dowling Mysteries	Alice Carmichael	Episode: "The Solid Gold Headache Mystery"
1990	Doctor Doctor	Sadie Mitchell	Episode: "Good Doc, Bad Doc"
1991	Doc Hollywood	Violet, Welcoming Committee	
1991	Fire in the Dark	Gladys	TV movie
1991	Man of the People	Ethel Jones	Episode: "Of Cars and Kids and Cads"
1992	Empty Nest	Mrs. Robinson	Episode: "Charley for President"
1993	The Golden Palace	Sylvia	Episode: "The Chicken and the Egg"
1993	Matlock	Irene Payson	Episode: "The Capital Offense"
1994	Models Inc.	Opal	Episode: "In Models We Trust"
1994	Spring Awakening	Mrs. Skimmons	TV movie
1995	Full House	Edna	Episode: "Leap of Faith"
1995	An Element of Truth	Joanne	TV movie
1995	Can't Hurry Love	Shirley	Episode: "Not Home Alone"
1996	Sister, Sister	Geraldine Jones	Episode: "The Volunteers"
1996	The Client	Aunt Clara	Episode: "Damn Yankees"
1996	Mad About You	Woman Customer	Episode: "The Weed"
1996	Roseanne	Agnes	Episode: "Ballroom Blitz"
1996	Shiloh	Mrs. Young	
1996	Ned and Stacey	Bea	Episode: "The Muffins Take Manhattan"
1997	Wings	Mrs. Herbert	Episode: "Just Call Me Angel"
1997	Chicago Hope	Betty Fenton	Episode: "Leggo My Ego"
1997	Tower of Terror	Abigail Gregory	TV movie
1997	Dr. Quinn, Medicine Woman	Twila	Episode: "Lead Me Not"
1998	Krippendorf's Tribe	Gladys Schmades	
1998	Ellen	Old Woman	Episode: "When Ellen Talks, People Listen"
1998	Maggie	Mrs. Cullen	Episode: "Liar, Liar"
1998	I'll Be Home for Christmas	Tom Tom Girl Mary	
1999	7th Heaven	Old Woman	Episode "The Tribes That Bind"
1999	Inherit the Wind	Mrs. Krebs	TV movie
1999-2000	ER	Jean Connelly	2 episodes
2000	Another Woman's Husband	Annette	TV movie
2001	Wanderlust	Aunt Clara	(final film role)
