= Princeton Summer Theater =

Princeton Summer Theater is a summer stock theater group located on the Princeton University campus. It was founded in 1968 by a group of Princeton University undergraduates under the name 'Summer Intime' as a high grade summer stock theater company.

== Organizational history ==
In the 1930s, members of student-run Theater Intime, initiated summer theater at Princeton. From the late 1920s until the 50s students called the summer company the University Players. The University Players operated from Hamilton Murray Theater for years. In 1968, the group became semi-independent from the University under the name "Summer Intime", and in the late 70s it was renamed Princeton Summer Theater. Every summer a new company of Princeton students forms to present a season of four main stage shows and a children's show.

Dedicated to training future leaders of the theater world, Princeton Summer Theater offers students and young professionals experience working in every area of theatre production, from performance, to design, to marketing, to theater management. In recent years the company has also included members from the Tisch School of the Arts at NYU, Rutgers University and Rider University. Notable alumni include John Lithgow, Bebe Neuwirth, William Hootkins, Geoff Rich, Mark Nelson, Winnie Holzman, Bretaigne Windust and Henry Fonda.

Hamilton Murray Theater was dubbed a "jewel box of a theater" by Stuart Duncan of the "Princeton Packet".

Princeton Summer Theater celebrated its half-centennial along with Theatre Intime's centennial in November 2022, after delays due to the COVID-19 pandemic.

== Current season ==
2026
Barefoot in the Park by Neil Simon
The 39 Steps by Patrick Barlow
True West by Sam Sheppard

== Past seasons ==
=== University Players ===
1928

The Dover Road by A. A. Milne
Beyond the Horizon by Eugene O'Neill
The Torch-Bearers by George Kelly
The Jest by Sam Benelli
In the Next Room by Eleanor Belmont and Harriet Ford
The New Way by Annie Nathan Meyer
Is Zat So
The Thirteenth Chair by Bayard Veiller

1929

The Devil in the Cheese by Tom Cushing
The Donovan Affair by Owen Davis (directed by Henry Fonda)
Outward Bound by Sutton Vane
The Last Warning by Thomas F. Fallon (directed by Bretaigne Windust '28)
Merton of the Movies by George S. Kaufman and Marc Connelly
Crime by Kent Smith
The Bad Man by Porter Emerson Browne
The Czarina by Melchior Lengyel and Ludwig Biro
The Constant Nymph by Margaret Kennedy and Basil Dean (directed by Charles Leatherbee)

1930

Murray Hill by Leslie Howard
The Wooden Kimono by Bretaigne Windust
The Watched Pot by Saki and Charles Maude
Thunder on the Left by Jean Ferguson Black
The Makropulos Affair by Karel Čapek
The Firebrand by Edwin Justus Mayer
Hell-Bent Fer Heaven by Hatcher Hughes
The Marquise by Noël Coward
A Kiss for Cinderella by J.M. Barrie

1931

Paris Found by Philip Barry
Interference by Roland Pertwee and Harold Dearden
Mr. Pim Passes By by A. A. Milne
Coquette by Ann Preston Bridgers and George Abbott
Her Cardboard Lover by Jacques Deval (Dans sa candeur naïve, translated by Valerie Wyngate and P. G. Wodehouse)
The Trial of Mary Dugan by Bayard Veiller
The Guardsman by Ferenc Molnár (original title: Testőr)
Juno and the Paycock by Seán O'Casey
The Silent House by John G. Brandon and George Pickett
The Italian Straw Hat (Un chapeau de paille d'Italie) by Eugène Marin Labiche and Marc Michel

In July 1933 a fire devastated the theater, starting in the basement and burning up the entire stage. It was renovated over the summer.

1948

No Exit (Huis clos) by Jean-Paul Sartre
How He Lied to Her Husband by George Bernard Shaw
The Beautiful People by William Saroyan
Yes Is for a Very Young Man by Gertrude Stein

1949

The Vegetable by F. Scott Fitzgerald
Cathleen ni Houlihan by W. B. Yeats
Purgatory by W. B. Yeats
The End of the Beginning by Seán O'Casey
The Streets of New York by Dion Boucicault

In 1951 and 1952, no productions were staged due to the Korean War.

1953

The Rose Tattoo by Tennessee Williams
The Devil's Disciple by George Bernard Shaw
The Infernal Machine by Jean Cocteau
Hello Out There by William Saroyan
The Apollo of Bellac by Jean Giraudoux
Red Peppers by Noël Coward
The Italian Straw Hat (Un chapeau de paille d'Italie) by Eugène Marin Labiche and Marc Michel
The Tempest by William Shakespeare

1954

Camino Real by Tennessee Williams
Right You Are (If you think so) (Così è (se vi pare)) by Luigi Pirandello
A Penny for a Song by John Whiting (American première)
Theatre of the Soul by Nikolai Evreinov
Queens of France by Thornton Wilder
Village Wooing by George Bernard Shaw
Ghosts (original Danish title: Gengangere) by Henrik Ibsen
Show Loves Me Not by Howard Lindsay
Alice in Wonderland by Lewis Carroll adapted by Mario Siletti
Twelfth Night by William Shakespeare

1956

Saint Joan by George Bernard Shaw
Charley's Aunt by Brandon Thomas
Blood Wedding by García Lorca
The Grass Harp by Truman Capote
The Father (Swedish: Fadren) by August Strindberg
Ring Round the Moon by Christopher Fry (adapted from L'Invitation au Château by Jean Anouilh)
The Happy Journey to Trenton and Camden by Thornton Wilder
Bedtime Story by Seán O'Casey
As You Like It by William Shakespeare

1957

A Streetcar Named Desire by Tennessee Williams
The Skin of Our Teeth by Thornton Wilder
Heartbreak House by George Bernard Shaw
The Enchanted by Jean Giraudoux
The Love of Don Perlimplín and Belisa in the Garden (original title: Amor de Don Perlimplín con Belisa en su jardín) by García Lorca
The Tinker's Wedding by J. M. Synge
The Shadow of a Gunman by Seán O'Casey
Love's Labour's Lost by William Shakespeare
Lord Byron's Love Letter by Tennessee Williams

1958

A View from the Bridge by Arthur Miller
The Matchmaker by Thornton Wilder
Legends of Lovers by Jean Anouilh (original title Eurydice, translated by Kitty Black as Point of Departure and republished as Legend of Lovers)
The Burnt Flower Bed (L'aiuola bruciata) by Ugo Betti
An Evening of Tennessee Williams: Auto Da Fé, The Case of the Crushed Petunias, The Unsatisfactory Supper
Misalliance by George Bernard Shaw
Purple Dust by Seán O'Casey
The Two Gentlemen of Verona by William Shakespeare

=== Summer Intime ===
- 1968

The Night of the Iguana by Tennessee Williams
Amphitryon 38 by Jean Giraudoux
The Trial (Le Procès) by André Gide and Jean-Louis Barrault (after the book by Franz Kafka)
Arms and the Man by George Bernard Shaw

- 1969

The Little Foxes by Lillian Hellman
L'Idiote (or A Shot in the Dark) by Marcel Achard
Anne of the Thousand Days by Maxwell Anderson
Heartbreak House by George Bernard Shaw

- 1970

The Eccentricities of a Nightingale by Tennessee Williams
The Playboy of the Western World by J. M. Synge
The Homecoming by Harold Pinter
Misalliance by George Bernard Shaw

- 1971

The Rainmaker by N. Richard Nash
Twelfth Night by William Shakespeare
A Day in the Death of Joe Egg by Peter Nichols
Uncle Vanya by Anton Chekhov

- 1972

Billy Liar by Keith Waterhouse and Willis Hall
Happy Birthday, Wanda June by Kurt Vonnegut
A Flea in Her Ear (La Puce à l'oreille) by Georges Feydeau
What the Butler Saw by Joe Orton

- 1973

The Philanthropist by Christopher Hampton
The Birthday Party by Harold Pinter
The Beaux' Stratagem by George Farquhar
Tango by Sławomir Mrożek
George Washington Crossing the Delaware by Koch

- 1974

Arms and the Man by George Bernard Shaw
Luv by Murray Schisgal
Baby Want a Kiss by James Costigan
The Lion in Winter by James Goldman

- 1975

Oh Dad, Poor Dad, Mamma's Hung You in the Closet and I'm Feelin' So Sad by Arthur Kopit
Charley's Aunt by Brandon Thomas
The Voice of the Turtle by John Van Druten
U.T.B.U. (Unhealthy To Be Unpleasant) by James Kirkwood, Jr.

- 1976

Fallen Angels by Noël Coward
The Imaginary Invalid (Le malade imaginaire) by Molière
Two for the Seesaw by William Gibson
Picnic by William Inge

- 1977

Cox and Box by F. C. Burnand and Arthur Sullivan
Candida by George Bernard Shaw
The Creation of the World and Other Business by Arthur Miller
110 in the Shade by Tom Jones and Harvey Schmidt
Moonchildren by Michael Weller
Alice Through the Looking-Glass by Lewis Carroll, Florida Friebus and Eva Le Gallienne

- 1978

Tartuffe by Molière
Holiday by Philip Barry
Match Play by McCleery
The Mousetrap by Agatha Christie

- 1979

Last of the Red Hot Lovers by Neil Simon
Towards Zero by Agatha Christie
The Matchmaker by Thornton Wilder
After the Fall by Arthur Miller

=== Princeton Summer Theater ===
- 1980

The Devil's Disciple by George Bernard Shaw
The Sorcerer by Gilbert and Sullivan
The Mound Builders by Lanford Wilson
Night Watch by Lucille Fletcher

In 1981 the theater was dark.

In 1982 and 1983 the summer company was known as Newstage at Intime

- 1982

Scapino! by Jim Dale and Frank Dunlop (an adaptation of Molière's Les Fourberies de Scapin)
The Belle of Amherst by William Luce
Happy End by Kurt Weill, Elisabeth Hauptmann, and Bertolt Brecht
The Freedom of the City by Brian Friel

- 1983

Bus Stop by William Inge
Talking With... by Jane Martin
March of the Falsettos by William Finn
Betrayal by Harold Pinter

- 1984

Sly Fox by Larry Gelbart
Angels Fall by Lanford Wilson
Say Goodnight, Gracie by Rupert Holmes
Side By Side By Sondheim by Stephen Sondheim

- 1985

Beyond Therapy by Christopher Durang
The Skin of Our Teeth by Thornton Wilder
A Coupla White Chicks Sitting Around Talking by John Ford Noonan
Starting Here, Starting Now by Richard Maltby, Jr. and David Shire

In 1986, a company from outside PST occupied The Hamilton Murray Theater.

- 1987

Noises Off by Michael Frayn
Don Juan in Hell by George Bernard Shaw
Arms and the Man by George Bernard Shaw
A Midsummer Night's Dream by William Shakespeare

The theater was dark in 1988 and 1989.

- 1990

The Nerd by Larry Shue
Three Postcards by Craig Lucas
Twelfth Night by William Shakespeare

- 1991

The Mousetrap by Agatha Christie
Same Time, Next Year by Bernard Slade
Much Ado about Nothing by William Shakespeare
Drinking in America by Eric Bogosian

- 1992

Dial M for Murder by Frederick Knott
Barefoot in the Park by Neil Simon
Run for Your Wife by Ray Cooney

- 1993

Sleuth by Anthony Shaffer
Little Shop of Horrors by Alan Menken and Howard Ashman
The Good Doctor by Neil Simon

- 1994

Speed-the-Plow by David Mamet
Private Lives by Noël Coward
A Midsummer Night's Dream by William Shakespeare
It's Only a Play

- 1995

The Glass Menagerie by Tennessee Williams
The Real Inspector Hound by Tom Stoppard
Much Ado about Nothing by William Shakespeare
Wait Until Dark by Frederick Knott

- 1996

The Fantastiks by Harvey Schmidt and Tom Jones
The Crucible by Arthur Miller
Romeo and Juliet by William Shakespeare
Lend Me a Tenor by Ken Ludwig

- 1997

Arsenic and Old Lace by Joseph Kesselring
Camelot by Alan Jay Lerner and Frederick Loewe
The Merchant of Venice by William Shakespeare
Our Town by Thornton Wilder

- 1998

Harvey by Mary Chase
She Loves Me by Joe Masteroff, Sheldon Harnick and Jerry Bock
The Taming of the Shrew by William Shakespeare
The Seagull by Anton Chekhov

During 1999 and 2000 extensive renovations carried out to the theater leaving it "dark".

- 2001

Barefoot in the Park by Neil Simon
Much Ado about Nothing by William Shakespeare
Joseph and the Amazing Technicolor Dreamcoat by Tim Rice and Andrew Lloyd Webber
The Effect of Gamma Rays on Man-in-the-Moon Marigolds by Paul Zindel

- 2002

Direct from Moscow
Baby with the Bathwater by Christopher Durang
A Midsummer Night's Dream by William Shakespeare
The Fantasticks by Harvey Schmidt and Tom Jones
How I Learned to Drive by Paula Vogel

- 2003

The Importance of Being Earnest by Oscar Wilde
You're a Good Man, Charlie Brown by Clark Gesner
Rosencrantz and Guildenstern Are Dead by Tom Stoppard
The Star-Spangled Girl by Neil Simon

- 2004

The Complete Works of William Shakespeare (Abridged) by Adam Long, Daniel Singer and Jess Winfield
Scenes From American Life
Private Lives by Noël Coward
Proof by David Auburn

- 2005

The Voice of the Turtle by John Van Druten
Godspell by Stephen Schwartz and John-Michael Tebelak
Dial M for Murder by Frederick Knott
Picasso at the Lapin Agile by Steve Martin

- 2006

Wait Until Dark by Frederick Knott
Black Comedy by Peter Shaffer
Little Shop of Horrors by Alan Menken and Howard Ashman
Betrayal by Harold Pinter

- 2007

Bell, Book and Candle by John Van Druten
Biloxi Blues by Neil Simon
10 Little Indians by Agatha Christie
'Art' by Yasmina Reza

- 2008

Arcadia by Tom Stoppard
Bus Stop by William Inge
An Inspector Calls by J. B. Priestley
Blithe Spirit by Noël Coward

- 2009

Urinetown by Mark Hollmann and Greg Kotis
The Glass Menagerie by Tennessee Williams
No Time for Comedy by S. N. Behrman
The Underpants adapted by Steve Martin from Die Hose by Carl Sternheim

- 2010

The Heidi Chronicles by Wendy Wasserstein
The Turn of the Screw by Henry James, adapted by Jeffrey Hatcher
Misalliance by George Bernard Shaw
Fifth of July by Lanford Wilson

- 2011

Into the Woods by Stephen Sondheim and James Lapine
Barefoot in the Park by Neil Simon
Beyond Therapy by Christopher Durang
A Doll's House by Henrik Ibsen

- 2012

A Little Night Music by Hugh Wheeler, music and lyrics by Stephen Sondheim
Gaslight by Patrick Hamilton
Boeing-Boeing by Marc Camoletti
The American Plan by Richard Greenberg

- 2013

She Loves Me by Joe Masteroff, lyrics by Sheldon Harnick, and music by Jerry Bock.
Crimes of the Heart by Beth Henley
The 39 Steps by Patrick Barlow
Time Stands Still by Donald Margulies

Princeton Summer Theater took a hiatus during the 2014 summer in order to make renovations to the theater.

- 2015

Metamorphoses by Mary Zimmerman
Pygmalion by George Bernard Shaw
The Real Inspector Hound by Tom Stoppard, paired with "The Actor's Nightmare" by Christopher Durang
Eurydice by Sarah Ruhl

- 2016

Assassins by John Weidman, music and lyrics by Stephen Sondheim
God of Carnage by Yasmina Reza, translated by Christopher Hampton
Rosencrantz and Guildenstern Are Dead by Tom Stoppard
Fool for Love by Sam Shepard

- 2017

Pippin by Roger O. Hirson, music and lyrics by Stephen Schwartz
The Crucible by Arthur Miller
Spider's Web by Agatha Christie
Appropriate by Branden Jacobs-Jenkins

- 2018

Tick, Tick... Boom! by Jonathan Larson
Uncommon Women and Others by Wendy Wasserstein
The Children's Hour by Lillian Hellman
The Baltimore Waltz by Paula Vogel

- 2019

Falsettos music and lyrics by William Finn and book by James Lapine
Deathtrap (play) by Ira Levin
A Midsummer Night's Dream by William Shakespeare
Topdog/Underdog by Suzan-Lori Parks

- 2020

Due to the pandemic of covid-19, the original season was unable to proceed as planned. Instead, the PST board curated a series of virtual events, including a virtual production of the show Night Vision by Dominique Morisseau and directed by Chamari White-Mink. The season also included a virtual production of a new children's play, A Curious Tea Party by Annika Bennett.

Princeton Summer Theater took a hiatus in 2021 due to the covid-19 pandemic.

- 2022
  The Great Gatsby by F. Scott Fitzgerald, adapted by Simon Levy
  The Fox on the Fairway by Ken Ludwig Detroit '67 by Dominique Morisseau
- 2023
  Pride and Prejudice by Kate Hammill, based on the novel by Jane Austen Ghost Quartet by Dave Malloy Peerless by Jiehae Park
- 2024
  Dracula adapted by Kate Hamill
  The Last Five Years by Jason Robert Brown
  Emergency by Daniel Beaty
- 2025

The Bridges of Madison County by Marsha Norman, Music and Lyrics by Jason Robert Brown, based on the novel by
Ken Ludwig's The Game's Afoot
Frankenstein by Nick Dear, based on the novel by Mary Shelley
Voice Lessons by Allison Spann

== Company name timeline ==
Company Name	Years
University Players	1928 - 1967
Summer Intime	1968 - 1980
Princeton Summer Theater	1981
Newstage at Intime	1982 - 1983
Princeton Summer Theater	1984 to present

== Sources ==
- http://princeton.patch.com/listings/princeton-summer-theater.
- Princeton Summer Theater Records, 1968-2008: Finding Aid
