= Bretaigne Windust =

American film director and television producer

- Publicity Photo of Bretaigne Windust
- Born: Ernest Bretaigne Windust; January 20, 1906; Paris, France
- Died: March 19, 1960 (aged 54); New York City, United States
- Occupation: Director
- Years active: 1928–1960

Ernest Bretaigne Windust (January 20, 1906 – March 19, 1960) was a United States–based, French-born theater, film and television director.

== Early life ==
Windust was born in Paris, the son of English violin virtuoso Ernest Joseph Windust and singer Elizabeth Amory Day from New York City. The family escaped to London during World War I, and it was there that he developed an interest in theater.

They returned to Paris following the war, but Windust's parents divorced in 1920 and he and his mother moved to the United States. He attended Columbia University and then Princeton, where he became a member and later president of the Theatre Intime players.

== Career ==
Planning to becoming an actor, Windust cofounded (with Charles Leatherbee) the University Players in 1928 on Cape Cod in Falmouth, Massachusetts. The company lasted five years and included later luminaries Joshua Logan, Henry Fonda, James Stewart, Margaret Sullavan, Mildred Natwick, Eleanor Phelps, Barbara O'Neil, Myron McCormick, Kent Smith and Aleta Freel.

Windust directed more often than he acted. Although he began his association with the Theatre Guild in Manhattan as an assistant stage manager in 1929, he maintained his position as a director of the University Players in the offseason when they performed on Cape Cod through mid-1932. He quit the Theatre Guild briefly during the winter season of 1931-32 to direct the University Players through its 18-week winter season in Baltimore.

Windust's first major credit as a professional theater director was the 1932 West End production of Eugene O'Neill's Strange Interlude. He directed Alfred Lunt and Lynn Fontanne in The Taming of the Shrew and Amphitryon 38 (which he translated from the original French) and appeared with them in Idiot's Delight, his last work as an actor.

Windust's first major Broadway hit was Life with Father, the Russel Crouse/Howard Lindsay play based on the memoirs of Clarence Day, Jr., a distant relative on Windust's mother's side. At 3,224 performances, it held the record for the longest-running Broadway production for many years. It remains the longest running non-musical show in Broadway history. In quick succession, he followed with Arsenic and Old Lace and Strip for Action, giving him three hits running simultaneously on Broadway. Windust cemented his Broadway career by directing the musical hit Finian's Rainbow (1947).

In 1947, Windust relocated to Hollywood, where he worked as the dialogue director for Stallion Road, starring Ronald Reagan. His film directing career included two 1948 Bette Davis vehicles, the melodramatic Winter Meeting and the screwball comedy June Bride. The latter part of his career was spent in the television division of Universal, directing episodes of Alfred Hitchcock Presents, Wagon Train, Leave It to Beaver and Bachelor Father, in addition to the Thanksgiving 1957 special The Pied Piper of Hamelin, later released as a feature film.

Windust's final work was the direction of an episode of the Startime television anthology series titled "Dear Arthur" that was taped several days before his death.

== Personal life ==
Windust's wife Irene Windust (née Corbett) was an actress who appeared in several feature films and multiple episodes of the television series Bachelor Father, Wagon Train and Alfred Hitchcock Presents.

== Death ==
On March 19, 1960, Windust was admitted to the New York-Presbyterian Hospital for an operation but died there at the age of 54.

== Selected filmography ==
=== Director ===
- June Bride (1948)
- Winter Meeting (1948)
- Perfect Strangers (1950)
- Pretty Baby (1950)
- The Enforcer (1951)
- The Pied Piper of Hamelin (1957)
- The Thin Man (3 episodes, 1958)
- Alfred Hitchcock Presents (2 episodes, 1959)
- Markham (4 episodes, 1959)
- Wagon Train (3 episodes, 1959)
- Leave It to Beaver (1 episode, 1960)
- Star Time (3 episodes, 1959–1960)
- Bachelor Father (10 episodes, 1959-1960)
- The Jim Backus Show (1 episode, 1960)

=== Producer ===
- Climax! (7 episodes, 1954–1955)
- Star Time (2 episodes, 1959–1960)

== Broadway credits ==
- The Hasty Heart (1945)
- State of the Union (1946)
- Finian's Rainbow (1947)
