= Theatre Intime =

Theatre company at Princeton University

Coordinates: 40°20′52.8″N 74°39′27.8″W

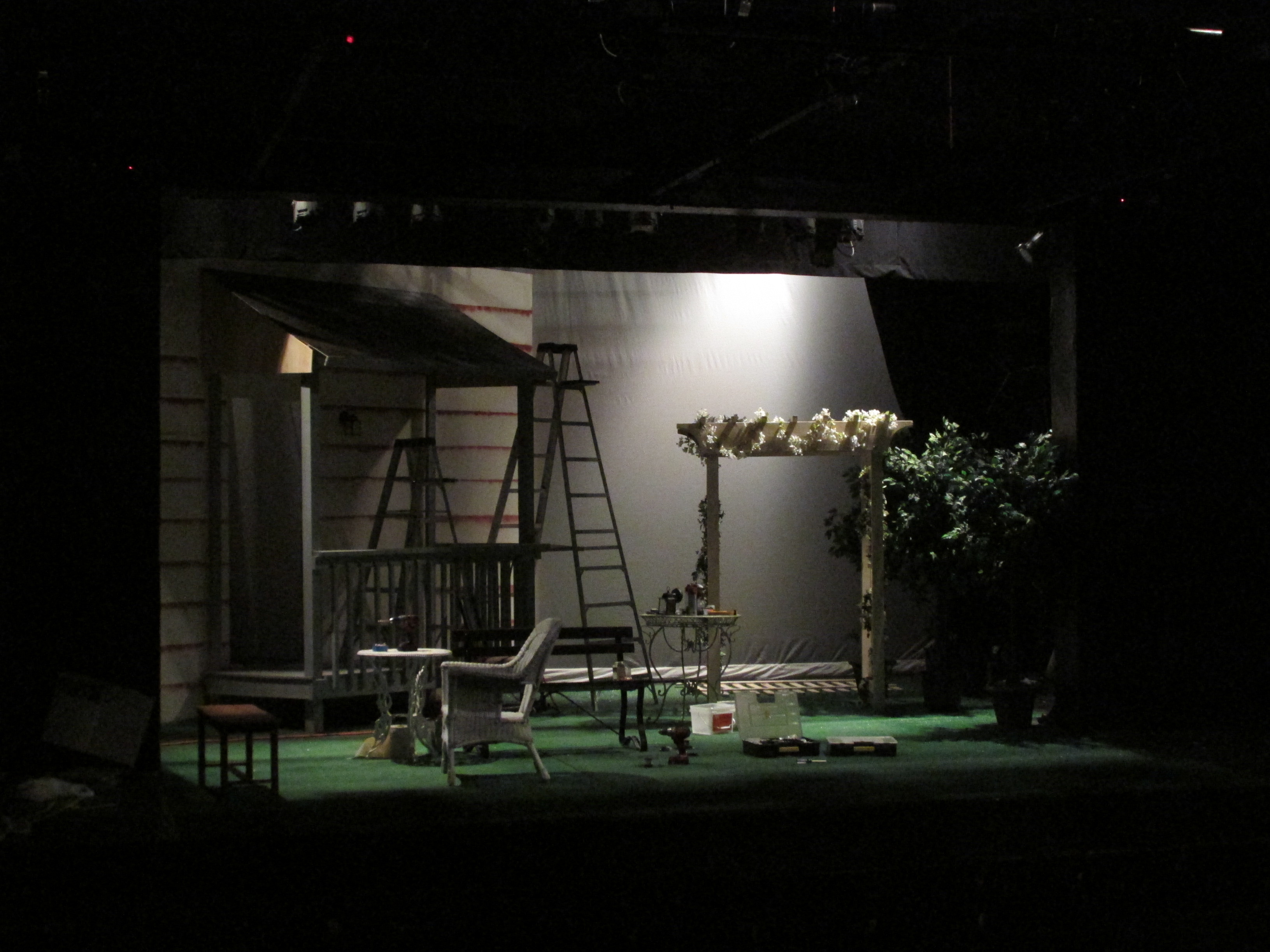
Preparing for the production of All My Sons

Theatre Intime is an American entirely student-run dramatic arts not-for-profit organization operating out of the Hamilton Murray Theater at Princeton University, located in Princeton, New Jersey.

Intime receives no direct support from the university, and is entirely acted, produced, directed, teched and managed by a board of students that is elected once a semester. "Students manage every aspect of Theatre Intime, from choosing the plays to setting the ticket prices."

== History ==
Theatre Intime was founded in 1920 by a group of Princeton undergraduates; in 1922 it took over the Hamilton Murray Theater as its stage. It has presented the American premieres of several plays by prominent creators, including Jean Cocteau's The Typewriter and W. H. Auden's Age of Anxiety. Members of the troupe have included Jimmy Stewart, Joshua Logan, Larry Strichman, William Hootkins, John C. Vennema, Roger Berlind, Mark Feuerstein, Charles Scribner, Clark Gesner, Richard Greenberg, Winnie Holzman, Mark Nelson, and Wentworth Miller.

In the late 1920s, the group spawned a summer theater project, the University Players, whose early members included Stewart, Logan, and Henry Fonda. Later, a semi-professional summer company was founded by Charles Bernstein, class of 1967, and Jon Lorrain and Geoff Peterson, class of 1969. It was called 'Summer Intime.' In its first season, the company produced The Night of the Iguana, Amphitryon 38, The Trial and Arms and the Man. It paid salaries to its acting company by selling subscriptions to the Princeton community. Some years later, the name of the summer company was changed to Princeton Summer Theater.

In November 2022, Theatre Intime celebrated its centennial after delays due to the COVID-19 pandemic.

== Board ==
The Intime board is composed entirely of current undergraduates. It is divided into two levels, the Managing Board, which includes roles such as Costumes Manager and House Manager and is elected every semester, and the Executive Board, which is headed by the General Manager, Business Manager, and Production Manager and is elected once a year at the beginning of the spring term. The board is responsible for the maintenance and running of the theater as well as choosing the season every year from a list of submitted proposals.

== Seasons ==
2024–2025

- The Harvest by Samuel D. Hunter
- Eurydice by Sarah Ruhl
- Carrie: The Musical by Michael Gore, Dean Pitchford, and Lawrence D. Cohen
- Missing Dog, Very Helpful by Kristen Tan '26
- King Lear by William Shakespeare

2023–2024

- Low Pay? Don't Pay! by Dario Fo, Translated by Joseph Farrell
- All The Things They Wish They Said by Matthew Cooperberg '26
- Something Rotten by Karey Kirkpatrick, Wayne Kirkpatrick, and John O’Farrell
- Pipeline by Dominique Morisseau
- Yaga by Kat Sandler
- Pippin by Stephen Schwartz and Roger O. Hirson

2022–2023

- Celebration and Party Time by Harold Pinter
- Twelfth Night by William Shakespeare
- Autumn Rewind by Le'Naya Wilkerson '25
- Torch Song by Harvey Fierstein

2021–2022

- Sniper by Bonnie Culver
- Much Ado About Nothing by William Shakespeare
- A Doll's House by Henrik Ibsen
- The Laramie Project by Moisés Kaufman
- Shrek the Musical by Jeanine Tesori and David Lindsay-Abaire

2020–2021

The 2020–2021 season was interrupted by the COVID-19 pandemic. The Mainstage season was supplemented by a number of original festivals.

- As You Like It by William Shakespeare

2019–2020

- Eurydice by Sarah Ruhl
- Measure for Measure by William Shakespeare
- Antigonick by Anne Carson
- Vanya and Sonia and Masha and Spike by Christopher Durang
- Sweeney Todd by Stephen Sondheim (music and lyrics) and Hugh Wheeler (book)

=== 2018–2019 ===
- The Moors by Jen Silverman
- Iphigenia at Aulis by Euripides
- Iphigenia and Other Daughters by Ellen McLaughlin
- The Luck of the Irish by Kirsten Greenidge
- Cowboy vs. Samurai by Michael Golamco
- Richard III by William Shakespeare
- Seascape by Edward Albee

=== 2017–2018 ===
- The Flick by Annie Baker
- Arcadia by Tom Stoppard
- She Kills Monsters by Qui Nguyen
- Stop Kiss by Diana Son
- A Funny Thing Happened on the Way to the Forum by Stephen Sondheim (lyrics), Burt Shevelove (book), and Larry Gelbart (music)

=== 2016–2017 ===
- Blue Heart by Caryl Churchill
- California Suite by Neil Simon
- Speech & Debate by Stephen Karam
- Agamemnon by Aeschylus
- Mud by Maria Irene Fornes

=== 2015–2016 ===
- Gidion's Knot by Johnna Adams
- Bengal Tiger at the Baghdad Zoo by Rajiv Joseph
- When Dawn Breaks (an adaptation of One Thousand and One Nights) by Nico Krell '18
- Harvey by Mary Chase
- Oleanna by David Mamet

=== 2014–2015 ===
- Red by John Logan
- Romeo and Juliet by William Shakespeare
- The Little Dog Laughed by Douglas Carter Beane
- La Cage aux Folles by Harvey Fierstein (book) and Jerry Herman (music and lyrics)
- How the Other Half Loves by Alan Ayckbourn

=== 2013–2014 ===
- Fuddy Meers by David Lindsay-Abaire
- All My Sons by Arthur Miller
- Frankenstein by Robert Sandberg
- The Language Archive by Julia Cho
- Venus in Fur by David Ives
- The Drowsy Chaperone by Bob Martin and Don McKellar (book), Lisa Lambert and Greg Morrison (music and lyrics)
- Everything In Isolation by Ava Geyer '15

=== 2012–2013 ===
- Gruesome Playground Injuries by Rajiv Joseph
- Wait Until Dark by Frederick Knott
- Sight Unseen (play) by Donald Margulies
- The Baltimore Waltz by Paula Vogel
- Circle Mirror Transformation by Annie Baker
- Sexy Imaginary Friend by Mark Watter '14
- June Groom by Rick Abbot

=== 2011–2012 ===
- Lost in Yonkers by Neil Simon
- Rock 'n' Roll by Tom Stoppard
- The Pavilion by Craig Wright
- Dead Man's Cell Phone by Sarah Ruhl
- Private Lives by Noël Coward
- Admissions by Clayton Raithel, Dan Abromowitz, and Nora Sullivan
- 7 Stories by Morris Panych

=== 2010–2011 ===
- Red Herring by Michael Hollinger
- This Is Our Youth by Kenneth Lonergan
- Garden District by Tennessee Williams
- Recent Tragic Events by Craig Wright
- Brighton Beach Memoirs by Neil Simon
- The Elephant Man by Bernard Pomerance
- Amateurs by Tom Griffin

=== 2009–2010 ===
- Proof by David Auburn
- Venting by Mara Nelson-Greenberg
- Crime and Punishment by Marilyn Campbell and Curt Columbus
- The Tempest by William Shakespeare
- Copenhagen by Michael Frayn
- Reefer Madness by Kevin Murphy (books and lyrics) and Dan Studney (music)
- Catch Me If You Can by Jack Weinstock and Willie Gilbert

=== 2008–2009 ===
- Crimes of the Heart by Beth Henley
- Some Things You Need to Know Before the World Ends by Larry Larson and Levi Lee
- Boy Gets Girl by Rebecca Gilman
- Metamorphoses by Mary Zimmerman
- King Lear by William Shakespeare
- Hey Boy Wonder! The Other Adventures of Ultraman by Shawn Fennell
- Our Town by Thornton Wilder

=== 2007–2008 ===
- The Violet Hour by Richard Greenberg
- Topdog/Underdog by Suzan-Lori Parks
- The Skin of Our Teeth by Thornton Wilder
- Macbeth by William Shakespeare
- The Pillowman by Martin McDonagh
- Arabian Nights by Mary Zimmerman
- The Foreigner by Larry Shue

=== 2006–2007 ===
- Boston Marriage by David Mamet
- Cuchulain Comforted by W.B. Yeats
- Equus by Peter Schaffer
- Terra Nova by Ted Talley
- Valentine at Bellevue by Joshua Williams
- Under Milk Wood by Dylan Thomas
- Glengarry Glenn Ross by David Mamet

=== 2005–2006 ===
- Buried Child by Sam Shepard
- Too Much Light Makes the Baby Go Blind by The Neo-Futurists
- Wonderland Salvage by Joshua Williams
- Fences by August Wilson
- The Goat, or Who Is Sylvia? by Edward Albee
- College: The Musical by Scott Elmegreen and Drew Fornarola
- All My Sons by Arthur Miller

=== 2004–2005 ===
- Fair Game by Karl Gajdusek
- Rumors by Neil Simon
- The Real Thing by Tom Stoppard
- A Chorus Line by James Kirkwood & Nicholas Dante (book), Marvin Hamlisch (music), Edward Kleban (lyrics)
- Cymbeline by William Shakespeare
- The Bald Soprano and The Chairs by Eugène Ionesco
- Hannah and Martin by Kate Fodor

=== 2003–2004 ===
- Hysteria by Terry Johnson
- The Laramie Project by Moisés Kaufman and the Tectonic Theater Project
- No Exit by Jean-Paul Sartre
- The Clouds by Aristophanes
- The Trestle at Pope Lick Creek by Naomi Wallace
- Cabaret by John Kander (music), Fred Ebb (lyrics), and Joe Masteroff (book)
- The Master and Margarita adapted by Peter Morris

=== 2002–2003 ===
- Betty's Summer Vacation by Christopher Durang
- Men Without Shadows by Jean-Paul Sartre
- The Hothouse by Harold Pinter
- Six Degrees of Separation by John Guare
- The Water Engine by David Mamet
- Bums and Monkeys by David Brundige
- The Fix by John Depsey (book) and Dana P. Rowe (music)

=== 2001–2002 ===
- The Effect of Gamma Rays on Man-in-the-Moon Marigolds by Paul Zindel
- The Real Inspector Hound by Tom Stoppard
- The Shadow Box by Michael Christopher
- Man of La Mancha by Dale Wasserman (book), Joe Darion (lyrics), and Mitch Leigh (music)
- The American Dream and The Zoo Story by Edward Albee
- Stop Kiss by Diana Son
- Rhinoceros by Eugene Ionescu
- Student Playwrights Festival
- Plaza Suite by Neil Simon

=== 2000–2001 ===
- Noises Off by Michael Frayn
- Who's Afraid of Virginia Woolf? by Edward Albee
- Hedda Gabler by Henrik Ibsen
- Death and the Maiden by Ariel Dorfman
- Picasso at the Lapin Agile by Steve Martin
- The House of Yes by Wendy MacLeod
- Macbeth by William Shakespeare

=== 1999–2000 ===
- Rosencrantz and Guildenstern Are Dead by Tom Stoppard
- Educating Rita by Willy Russell
- Mad Forest by Caryl Churchill
- Jeffrey by Paul Rudnick
- Assassins by Stephen Sondheim (music, lyrics) and John Weidman (book)
- J.B. by Archibald MacLeish
- Beyond Therapy by Christopher Durang
- Student Playwrights Festival

=== 1998–1999 ===
- I Hate Hamlet by Paul Rudnick
- Arms and the Man by George Bernard Shaw
- Tartuffe by Molière
- Extremities by William Mastrosimone
- The Mousetrap by Agatha Christie
- The Colored Museum by George C. Wolfe
- Arcadia by Tom Stoppard
- Student Playwrights Festival

=== 1997–1998 ===
- Brighton Beach Memoirs by Neil Simon
- The Glass Menagerie by Tennessee Williams
- Oh Dad, Poor Dad, Mamma's Hung You in the Closet and I'm Feelin' So Sad by Arthur Kopit
- Company by Stephen Sondheim
- Hay Fever by Noel Coward
- FOB (play) by David Henry Hwang
- Student Playwrights Festival

=== 1996–1997 ===
- An Actors Nightmare and Sister Mary Ignatious Explains It All for You, by Christopher Durang
- Pippin by Stephen Schwartz (music, lyrics) and Roger o. Hirson (book)
- Guest Production: Murder, Mystery, Mayhem, by Marvin Cheiten '65, directed by Dan Berkowitz '70
- Keely and Du by Jane Martin
- Crimes of the Heart by Beth Henley
- All in the Timing by David Ives
- A Few Good Men by Aaron Sorkin
- The Importance of Being Earnest by Oscar Wilde

=== 1995–1996 ===
- Six Degrees of Separation by John Guare
- Gatsby, adapted and directed by Erik Brodnax '96 from the novel
- Burn This by Lanford Wilson, directed by Suzanne Agins '97
- The Bacchae by Euripides
- Dime Store Zen, organized by Joseph Hernandez-Kolski
- Bent by Martin Sherman
- Daughters of Survival, 50 year memorial of female experience in Auschwitz, written and directed by Jennifer Huang '97
- True West by Sam Shepherd
- Student Playwrights Festival

=== 1994–1995 ===
- Lips Together, Teeth Apart by Terrence McNally
- Sexual Peversity in Chicago by David Mamet
- Ducks by David Mamet
- Across Jordan by Merle Field and Margaret Pine: Guest Production and World Premiere
- Les Liaisons Dangereuses by Christopher Hampton
- The Marriage of Bette and Boo by Christopher Durang
- Grotesque Lovesongs by Don Nigro
- Rosencrantz and Guildenstern Are Dead by Tom Stoppard
- Our Country's Good by Timberlake Wertenbaker
- Dime Store Zen, a festival of scenes, dances and monologues organized by Kiersten Van Horne '95
- The Maids by Jean Genet
- Student Playwrights Festival

=== 1993–1994 ===
- Vampire Lesbians of Sodom by Charles Busch
- The Shadow Box by Michael Christopher
- Hamlet by Pirandello
- Buried Child by Sam Shepherd
- The Tempest
- Steel Magnolias by Robert Harling
- Student Plays
- Great Tuna by Gaston, Sears and Howard

=== 1992–1993 ===
- Little Footsteps by Ted Tally
- Master Harold and the Boys by Atho Fugard
- The Importance of Being Earnest by Oscar Wilde
- The House of Blue Leaves by John Guare
- Noises Off by Michael Frayn
- Another Antigone by A.R. Gurney
- Suddenly Last Summer by Tennessee Williams
- Solitary Confinement by Jeff Gothard '95

=== 1991–1992 ===
- Here Lies Jeremy Troy by Jack Sharkey
- Drinking in America by Eric Bogosian
- The Foreigner by Larry Shue
- Deathtrap by Ira Levin
- As You Like It
- The Gospel of Luke by Bruce Kuhn
- The Rehearsal by Jean Anouilh
- Find Me by Olwen Wynmark
- Cyrano de Bergerac by Edmond Rostand
- The Cherry Orchard
- Student plays

=== 1990–1991 ===
- White Stones by Bill Boesky '88
- Laundry and Bourbon by James McLure
- Talk Radio by Eric Bogosain
- Hurlyburly by David Rabe
- Rhinoceros by Ionesco
- Amadeus by Peter Schaffer
- Waiting for Godot by Samuel Beckett
- Student Plays
- Biloxi Blues by Neil Simon

=== 1989–1990 ===
- Luv by Murray Schisgal
- No Exit by Jean-Paul Sartre
- Uncommon Women by Wendy Wasserstein
- A Lesson from Aloes by Athol Fugard
- Burn This by Lanford Wilson
- Orphans by Lyle Kessler
- Fool for Love by Sam Shepard
- Student Plays
- Dusa, Fish, Stas and Vi

=== 1988–1989 ===
- Brilliant Traces by Cindy Lou Johnson
- Sister Mary Ignatius Explains Its All For You by Christopher Durang
- Benefactors by Michael Frayn
- In the Jungle of the Cities by Bertolt Brecht
- Hair by Geronme Ragnim James Rando and Galt MacDermot
- Blood Relations by Sharon Pollock
- Old Times by Harold Pinter
- Student Plays
- The Day Room by Don Delilo

=== 1987–1988 ===
- Private Scenes
- Play/ Come and Go/ What, Where, by Samuel Beckett, directed by Elizabeth Quainton '89 and Colgate grad Russel Reich
- Equus by Peter Schaffer
- The Promise by Alexei Arbuzov
- The Prisoner of Second Avenue by Neil Simon
- The Serpent by Jean Claude van Itallie
- Aunt Dan and Lemon by Wallace Shawn
- Student Plays
- Mousetrap by Agatha Christie

=== 1986–1987 ===
- Condemned by Tennessee Williams
- Alternative Voices in American Theater, led by Kevin Teal and Ilze Thielman
- The Dutchman and The Sound of a Voice by David Hwang
- Happy Birthday Wanda June by Kurt Vonnegut
- The Real Thing by Tom Stoppard
- Crimes of the Heart by Beth Henley
- Extremities by William Mastrosimone
- The Time by Paul Schiff Berman '88

=== 1985–1986 ===
- Home Free by Lanford Wilson
- The Maids by Jean Genet
- Shivaree by William Mastrosimone
- Blue Window by Craig Lucas
- Twelfth Night
- Dracula
- Agnes of God by John Pielmeier
- Of Mice and Men by John Steinbeck

=== 1984–1985 ===
- Lone Star by Kevin Groome '85
- A Night Out by Harold Pinter
- Performing by Michael Kaplan '85
- The Diviners by Jim Leonard
- The Lion in Winter by James Goldman
- Rosencrantz and Guildenstern Are Dead by Tom Stoppard
- Who's Afraid of Virginia Woolf by Edward Albee
- Sexual Perversity in Chicago
- Suddenly Last Summer by Tennessee Williams
- Julius Caesar

=== 1983–1984 ===
- The American Dream by Edward Albee
- Silence by Harold Pinter
- Miss Julie by Strindberg
- The House of Blue Leaves by John Guare
- Curiculo by Plautus
- Pippin by Roger O. Hirson and Stephen Schwartz
- The Cocktail Party by T.S. Eliot
- Nuts by Tom Topor
- Dead Give-Away by Michael Rosenfeld '84, directed by Veronica Brady
- Feiffer's People by Jules Feiffer

=== 1982–1983 ===
- Jack, or The Submission by Ionesco
- The Bear by Anton Chekhov
- On the Harmfulness of Tobacco by Anton Chekhov
- A Marriage Proposal by Anton Chekhov
- As You Like It
- They Are Dying Out by Peter Handke
- Adaptation by Elaine May
- Plants and Waiters by William Anastasi
- Brussels by Jacques Brel
- The Rimers of Eldritch by Lanford Wilson
- Born Yesterday by Garson Kanvin
- A Soldier's Tale by Igor Stravinsky
- The Odd Couple by Neil Simon

=== 1981–1982 ===
- Feiffer's People by Jules Feiffer
- The Loveliest Afternoon of the Year by John Guare
- The Dumwaiter by Harold Pinter
- Camino Real by Tennessee Williams
- Misanthrope by Molière
- Godspell by Stephen Schwartz
- Black Comedy by Peter Schaffer
- Lysistrata by Aristophanes
- Stage Directions by Israel Horowitz
- Aria de Capo by Edna St. Vincent Millay
- Scenes from American Life by A.R. Gurney

=== 1980–1981 ===
- The Birdbath by Leonard Malfi
- No Exit by Jean-Paul Sartre
- The Lesson by Eugène Ionesco
- The Importance of Being Earnest by Oscar Wilde
- The Fifth Column by Ernest Hemingway
- Harvey by Mary Chase
- Man is Man by Bertolt Brecht
- The Impresario by Gian Lorenzo Bernini
- Lovers by Brian Friel
- The Zoo Story by Edward Albee
- A Child's Guide to American History
- One woman show based on the life of Edna St. Vincint Millay, by Kelly Easterling '81

=== 1979–1980 ===
- A Jaques Brel by Jaques Brel
- Welcome to Andromeda by Ron Whyte
- Home Free by Lanford Wilson
- The Birthday Party by Harold Pinter
- The Norman Conquests by Alan Ayckbourn
- Hedda Gabler by Henrik Ibsen
- A Day in the Death of Joe Egg by Peter Nichols
- Antigone by Jean Anouilh
- MIT Shakespeare Ensemble in Residence, performing The Winter's Tale

=== 1978–1979 ===
- Anatol by Arthur Schnitxler
- Romeo and Juliet
- The Typists by Murray Schisgal
- 27 Wagons of Cotton, by Tennessee Williams
- On the Harmfulness of Tobacco by Chekhov
- Patience by Gilbert and Sullivan
- Aeneas in Flames by Billy Aronson '79, directed by Carol Elliott
- The Children's Hour by Lillian Hellman
- Troilus and Cressida
- MIT Shakespeare Ensemble in Residence.

=== 1977–1978 ===
- The Tiger
- Anyone Can Whistle by Stephen Sondheim, directed by Geoff Rich '78
- When You Comin' Back Red Ryder? by Mark Medoff
- House of Blue Leaves by John Guare
- On the Harmfulness of Tobacco by Chekhov
- The Bear by Chekhov
- The Chorus Girl by Chekhov
- This Property is Condemned by Tennessee Williams
- Talk to Me Like the Rain and Let me Listen by Tennessee Williams
- Loot by Joe Orten

=== 1976–1977 ===
- How He Lied to Her Husband by George Bernard Shaw
- Old Times by Harold Pinter
- The Tempest
- Don Juan by Molière
- Sea Fantasy by Billy Aronson
- Tonight at 8.30 by Noël Coward
- The Vise by Pirandello
- The Birdbath by Leonard Malfi
- Ring Around the Moon by Jean Anouilh, directed by Geoff Rich '78
- Endgame by Samuel Beckett

=== 1975–1976 ===
- The Golden Fleece by A.R. Gurney
- The Public Eye by Peter Schaffer, director Kate Stewart '77
- The Private Ear by Peter Schaffer, director by Mitchell Ivers '77
- All's Well That Ends Well
- Lysistrata by Aristophanes
- We're on the One Road
- The Marriage of Bette and Boo by Christopher Durang

=== 1974–1975 ===
- The Typists by Murray Schisgal
- The Effect of Gamma Rays on Man-in-the-Moon-Marigolds by Paul Zindel
- The Real Inspector Hound by Tom Stoppard
- After Magritte by Tom Stoppard
- Lovers by Brian Friel
- Ubu Cuckold by Alfred Jarry
- The Puppet Show by Alexander Blok
- The Caucasian Chalk Circle by Bertolt Brecht
- The Glass Menagerie by Tennessee Williams

=== 1973–1974 ===
- The Lover by Harold Pinter
- Adaptation by Elaine Mat
- Next by Terrence McNally
- Balls by Paul Foster
- The Successful Life of 3 by Maria Irene Fornes
- Measure for Measure
- Slow Dance on the Killing Ground by William Hanley
- The American Dream by Edward Albee
- The Sandbox by Edward Albee
- Citizen Kong
- 'Tis Pity She's a Whore by John Ford

=== 1972–1973 ===
- The Hundred and First by Kenneth Carmon
- As you Like It
- Electra by Euripides
- Ten Little Indians by Agatha Christie
- Squanto by Jim Magnuson, directed by Professor Robert Knapp
- Hay Fever by Noël Coward

=== 1971–1972 ===
- Dracula adapted from Tod Browning's film by Daniel Blackmon '73 and William Bowman '74
- Frogs! by Aristotle
- Phaedra by Racine
- The two Executioners by Arrabal
- The Hostage by Brendan Behan
- Woyzeck by Georg Buchner
- The Philanderer by George Bernard Shaw

=== 1970–1971 ===
- Zoo Story by Edward Albee
- Swan Song by Chekhov
- Three Penny Opera by Brecht
- The Physicists by Friedrich Dürrenmatt
- Endgame by Samuel Beckett
- Henry IV Part I
- Beyond the Fringe

=== 1969–1970 ===
- The Red Eye of Love by Arnold Weinstein
- A Man for All Seasons by Robert Bolt
- The Happy time by Samuel Taylor
- Marat/Sade

=== 1968–1969 ===
- The Dumbwaiter by Harold Pinter
- The Lesson by Eugène Ionesco
- The Clouds by Aristophanes
- The Killer by Eugène Ionesco, Directed by Professor Frederic O'Brady
- The World of Carl Sandburg
- Long Day's Journey Into Night by Eugene O'Neill
- Slow Dance on the Killing Ground, by William Hanley, directed by Professor Robert Knapp
- The Alchemist by Ben Jonson
- An Irish Faustus by Lawrence Durrell, directed by Dan Berkowitz '70
- Moby Dick Rehearsed by Orson Welles
- The Knack by Ann Jellicoe
- The Madness of Lady Bright by Lanford Wilson

=== 1967–1968 ===
- Under Milk Wood by Dylan Thomas
- The Balcony by Jean Genet
- Incident at Vichy by Arthur Miller
- The Misanthrope by Molier, Directed by Professor Frederic O'Brady
- The Dumbwaiter by Harold Pinter
- Hamlet
- Luv by Murray Schisgal
- Once Upon a Mattress by Jay Thompson, Marshall Baker and Dean Fuller
- Miracle by Max Kerpelman and Barry Miles, directed by Geoff Peterson '69

=== 1965–1966 ===
- Th White Devil by John Webster
- Sophocles' King Oedipus by W.B. Yeats
- The Bespoke Overcoat by Wolf Mankowitz
- You Can't Take It with You, by George Kaufman and Moss Hart
- Little Mary Sunshine by Rick Besoyan
- The Caretaker by Harold Pinter
- The Taming of the Shrew
- Those that I Fight by Joanna Russ
- The Cat and the Canary by John Willard, directed by Geoff Peterson '69
- Cat on a Hot Tin Roof by Tennessee Williams
- Thurber Carnival by James Thurber
- The Romanticks (Les Romanesques), Edmond Rostand

=== 1964–1965 ===
- Inherit the Wind by Lawrence and Robert Lee
- Passion, Poison, and Petrification by George Bernard Shaw
- Mister Roberts by Joshua Logan, Princeton '31 and Thomas Heggen
- Escurial by Michel de Gheldore
- The Dumbwaiter by Harold Pinter
- A Man's a Man by Bertolt Brecht

=== 1963–1964 ===
- The Potholder by Alice Gerstenberg
- The Skin of Our Teeth
- Kind Lady by Edward Choderate
- Zoo Story by Edward Albee
- The American Dream by Edward Albee
- Billy Budd by Herman Melville

=== 1962–1963 ===
- Hello Out There by William Saroyan
- Bedtime Story by Sean O'Casey
- A Streetcar Named Desire by Tennessee Williams
- The Devil's Disciple by George Bernard Shaw

=== 1961–1962 ===
- The Fisherman by Jonthon Tree
- Passion, Poison, and Petrification by George Bernard Shaw
- Charley's Aunt by Brandon Thomas
- Henry IV by Pirandello
- Look Back in Anger by John Osbourne
- Calvary by W.B. Yeats
- A Night of the Trojan War by John Drinkwater
- Passion, Poison and Petrification

=== 1960–1961 ===
- Purgatory by W.B. Yeats
- Professor Taranna by Arthur Adamov
- Recollections by Arthur Adamov
- The Jew of Malta by Christopher Marlowe
- Woyzeck by Georg Buchner
- Twenty-Seven Wagons Full of Cotton by Tennessee Williams
- The Purification by Tennessee Williams
- La Ronde by Arthur Schnitzler

=== 1958–1959 ===
- A Masque of Reason by Robert Frost
- World Without End
- Beyond the Horizon by Eugene O'Neill
- The Revenger's Tragedy by Cyril Trourneur
- Ondine by Jean Giraudoux
- Student Plays

=== 1957–1958 ===
- Hello OutThere by William Saroyan
- Sweeney Agonistes by T.S. Eliot
- The Rainmaker by Richard Nash
- The Alchemist by Ben Jonson
- The Glass Menagerie by Tennessee Williams
- Mother Loves me: A Freudian Fable by Clark Gesner, class '60, author of You're a Good Man, Charlie Brown

=== 1956–1957 ===
- Alcestis by Euripides
- Androcles and the Lion by George Bernard Shaw
- Measure for Measure
- Bound East for Cardiff by eugene O'Neil
- Student Plays
- The Caine Mutiny by Herman Wouk

=== 1955–1956 ===
- Liliom by Feremc Molnar
- Clash by Night by Clifford Odets
- Student Plays
- The Braggart Warrior by Plautus

=== 1954–1955 ===
- Murder in the Cathedral
- The Victors by Jean-Paul Sartre
- The Knight of the Burning Pestle by William Congreve
- Student Plays
- Love for Love by William Congreve

=== 1953–1954 ===
- An Evening of Readings
- Arms and the Man by George Bernard Shaw
- Henry IV, Part I
- Student Plays
- Tartuffe by Molière

=== 1952–1953 ===
- Antigone by Jean Anouilth
- Othello
- The White Rooster, film adapted by Charles Robinson '54
- Student Plays
- The Drunkard by Anonymous

=== 1951–1952 ===
- The Trojan War Will Not Take Place by Jean Giraudoux
- Student Plays, including A Modern Romance by Edwin Conquest, directed by Roger Berlind Princeton, '52
- The Searching Sun by John O'Hara

=== 1950–1951 ===
- The Importance of Being Earnest by Oscar Wilde
- The Petrified Forest by Robert Sherwood
- Henry IV
- Volpone by Ben Jonson
- Student Plays

=== 1949–1950 ===
- The School for Scandal by Sheridan
- The Typewriter by Jean Cocteau
- King Lear
- Student Plays
- Captain Brassbound's Conversion by George Bernard Shaw

=== 1948–1949 ===
- Yes Is for a Very Young Man by Gertrude Stein
- The Cenci by Percy Shelly
- A Christmas Carol
- Heartbreak House by George Bernard Shaw
- Student Plays
- Boy Meets Girl by Bella dn Samuel Spewack

=== 1947–1948 ===
- High Tor by Maxwell Anderson
- The Imaginary Invalid by Molière
- Richard II
- One on the House

=== 1946–1947 ===
- Blithe Spirit by Noël Coward
- The Critic by Sheridan
- The Scheming Lieutenant by Sheridan
- Twilight Bar
- Make Mine Sherry

=== 1945–1946 ===
- Break the Ice

=== 1941–1942 ===
- Jim Dandy by William Saroyan
- Three White Leopards
- Gabbatha
- Give the Earth a Little Longer by Jules Romains
- Come What April

=== 1940–1941 ===
- Our Boys by Bryon
- Troilus and Cressida
- Time of Their Lives by Robert Nail, Princeton '33
- The Lawyer by Ferenc Molnár
- Raise Your Six

=== 1928–1929 ===
- Much Ado About Nothing
- Crocadiles Are Happy
- Tsar Fyodor Ivanovitch by Alexei Tolstoy
- The Torchbearers by George Kelly
- The Old Timer by Charles Mather

=== 1927–1928 ===
- Caesar and Cleopatra by George Bernard Shaw
- Open Collars by Erik Barnouw '29
- The Wild Duck by Henrik Ibsen
- The Truth About Blayds by A.A. Milne
- The Devil's Disciple by George Bernard Shaw

=== 1926–1927 ===
- Doctor Faustus by Christopher Marlowe
- Student Plays
- Saint Joan by George Bernard Shaw
- Outward Bound by Sutton Vane
- Hamlet[13][14]

=== 1925–1926 ===
- Where the Cross is Made by Eugene O'Neill
- Wurzel-Flummery by A.A. Milne
- The Proposal by Chekhov
- Two Crooks and a Lady by Eugene Pillot
- A Good Woman by Arnold Bennett
- Candida by George Bernard Shaw
- The Green Goddess by William Archer

=== 1919–1920 ===
- Le Ballet Intime
- Ghost by Ibsen (last act)
- Macbeth
- Hamlet
- The Glittering Gate by Lord Dunsany
- Fame and the Poet by Lord Dunsany
- Swine by Lewis Laflin '26
- A Game of Chess by Kenneth Sawyer Goodman
- Sampson and Delilah by Ralph Kent '21 and Reginald Lawrence '21
- Interlude by A. Hyatt Mayor '22
- Isle of Paradise by Henry Hart '23 and Louis Laflin '26
- The Caine Mutiny by Herman Wouk

== Sources ==
- Dorgers, Edward (1950) A History of Dramatic Production in Princeton NJ. New York University: NLB
- Princeton University. "Theatre Intime Facility To Be Renovated." 2000, https://pr.princeton.edu/news/00/q2/0427-intime.htm. Accessed 7 Mar 2019.
