= The Pied Piper of Hamelin (1957 film) =

1957 television film directed by Bretaigne Windust

- DVD cover
- Based on: The Pied Piper of Hamelin by Robert Browning
- Written by: Hal Stanley; Irving Taylor
- Directed by: Bretaigne Windust
- Starring: See below
- Theme music composer: Edvard Grieg
- Country of origin: United States
- Original language: English

Production
- Producer: Hal Stanley
- Cinematography: William E. Snyder
- Editors: Norman A. Cerf; Floyd Knudtson
- Running time: 87 minutes

Original release
- Network: NBC
- Release: November 26, 1957

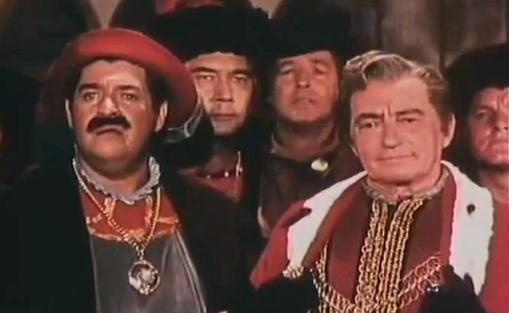
Stanley Adams (left) & Claude Rains

The Pied Piper of Hamelin is an American musical film based on the famous poem of the same name by Robert Browning and using the music of Edvard Grieg, arranged by Pete King with new lyrics by Hal Stanley and Irving Taylor. It stars Van Johnson, Claude Rains (in his only singing and dancing role), Lori Nelson, Jim Backus and Kay Starr. It was directed by Broadway veteran Bretaigne Windust. Nearly all of the dialogue in The Pied Piper of Hamelin is spoken in rhyme, much of it directly lifted from Browning's poem.

Initially airing on NBC on November 26, 1957, The Pied Piper of Hamelin was the first television film not presented live, in contrast to the usual televised family specials of the era, but on motion picture film using three-strip Technicolor, a tactic whose previous use on television was solely for the one-hour science specials Our Mr. Sun and Hemo the Magnificent. Theatrical prints erroneously bill the film as having been made in Eastmancolor.

Preempting that evening's telecasts of The Nat King Cole Show and The Eddie Fisher Show, the film's success spawned a record album, and it re-aired on NBC in 1958 before syndication on various local stations, where it was rerun annually in the tradition of other holiday specials. It received a brief theatrical release in 1966, though it did not fare nearly as well.

== Plot ==
The Pied Piper is first spotted working magic in Hamelin by a disabled boy, Paul, and playing his signature tune "In the Hall of the Mountain King." Paul tells his best friend, the schoolteacher Truson (who bears an uncanny resemblance to the Piper), who is skeptical.

The town of Hamelin has entered into a competition between several villages in order to win a banner from the king. The mayor exhorts the people, even the children, to work incessantly to build a clocktower to the extent that the children are denied school and play. Truson protests to no avail. As part of the competition, the mayor and his cabinet plan to cast golden chimes for the clocktower in order to impress the king's emissary, who is due to pay a visit to Hamelin. However, their efforts are temporarily halted when the town is invaded by rats, which have fled the neighboring city of Hamelout after the Weser River flooded and destroyed the town.

The Piper magically appears before the mayor and his councilors. Asking to be paid all the money in the town's treasury, he offers to rid the town of its rats. Whenever the Piper plays a happy song for the children, only Truson and the children can hear it. When he plays "In the Hall of the Mountain King" and leads the rats to their doom in the river, the children quickly fall asleep and only the materialistic adults such as the mayor, but not Truson, can hear the music.

The Piper has rid the town of its rats, but rather than simply paying him, the mayor and his cabinet attempt to trick him into signing an agreement whereby, among other legalistic trickery, he must deposit money to guarantee that the rats will not return. Furious, the Piper leaves without his money and the mayor plots to use the gold to construct the chimes. Truson, who is in love with the mayor's daughter Mara, is thrown in jail for speaking out against the injustice. The mayor plans to marry Mara to the king's emissary, but the Piper takes his revenge: playing a happy variation on "In the Hall of the Mountain King," he leads the children of Hamelin away into a beautiful kingdom concealed in a cave that magically opens for the children. Paul is accidentally left behind after falling, and the cave closes before he can pass through.

The town's leaders attempt to recover the children by blasting the mountain with cannon fire, and when this fails the mayor scapegoats Truson, using his resemblance to the Piper as one excuse, but this too fails when Truson appeals to the people. The mayor is deposed and Truson is chosen as the new mayor. He and Paul prepare to deliver money to help the refugee population of Hamelin, but before they depart Truson leads the town in silent prayer. Suddenly the sound of the Piper's pipe is heard. The Piper sets the children free, and Truson is magically gifted with the Piper's pipe, which he gives to the repentant former Mayor.

== Cast ==
- Van Johnson as Pied Piper / Truson
- Claude Rains as Mayor of Hamelin
- Lori Nelson as Mara
- Jim Backus as King's Emissary
- Kay Starr as John's Mother
- Doodles Weaver as the Mayor's Councillor
- Stanley Adams as the Mayor's Councillor
- Carl Benton Reid as the Hamelout Mayor
- Oliver Blake as Leading Villager
- Amzie Strickland as Leading Townswoman
- Rene Kroger as Paul
- Brian Corcoran as John

== Music ==
As in the 1944 Broadway musical Song of Norway, many of Grieg's most famous pieces are heard, but with lyrics. The first movement of the Piano Concerto in A Minor serves as the tune for the lovers' duet, Wedding-Day at Troldhaugen plays as a work song for the townsfolk and Grieg's Peer Gynt is used for most of the other musical numbers.

=== Soundtrack ===
All music by Edvard Grieg, and lyrics by Irving Taylor. Orchestra conducted by Pete King.

- "Pied Piper’s Morning Romp/In the Hall of the Mountain King" (orchestral arrangement adapted from Peer Gynt)
- Doodles Weaver and chorus - "Work Song" (adapted from "Wedding Day at Troldhaugen")
- Van Johnson - "How Can I Tell You?" (adapted from "Piano Concerto in A Minor")
- Claude Rains, Doodles Weaver, Stanley Adams and Councilors - "Prestige"
- "Befriendment of the Children/In the Hall of the Mountain King" (adapted from Peer Gynt)
- Van Johnson and Villagers - "Feats of the Piper" (adapted from "Anitra's Dance" from Peer Gynt)
- "Rat Exodus/In the Hall of the Mountain King" (orchestral arrangement adapted from Peer Gynt)
- "Morning Waltz" (adapted from "Morning Mood" from Peer Gynt)
- Van Johnson - "Flim Flam Floo" (adapted from one of the "Norwegian Dances")
- Claude Rains, Doodles Weaver, Stanley Adams and Councilors - "Prestige" Reprise
- Van Johnson - "Fool's Gold" (adapted from "Solvejg's Song" from Peer Gynt)
- Lori Nelson - "My Heart Will Fly to Heaven" (adapted from "Wedding Day at Troldhaugen")
- Villagers - "Welcome Emissary Song" (adapted from "Arabian Dance" from Peer Gynt)
- Van Johnson and Lori Nelson - "How Can I Tell You?" Reprise
- "Exodus of the Children/In the Hall of the Mountain King" (orchestral arrangement adapted from Peer Gynt)
- Kay Starr - "A Mother's Lament" (adapted from "Aase's Death" from Peer Gynt)
- "Return of the Children/In the Hall of the Mountain King" (adapted from Peer Gynt)

== Production ==
The film was one of several 1950s telecasts of musical fantasy specials for children. This trend started after the great success of the first two live telecasts (in 1955 and 1956) of Peter Pan, which had gained the largest audience for a televised special to date.

In late 1955, Hallmark Hall of Fame presented a live telecast of the 1932 stage adaptation of Alice in Wonderland. This was followed in 1956 by the first telecast of MGM's 1939 film The Wizard of Oz (starring Judy Garland), and the first, live version of Rodgers and Hammerstein's only musical for television, Cinderella (1957), starring Julie Andrews. Both Oz and Cinderella also drew large audiences. Only a month prior to the telecast of The Pied Piper of Hamelin, NBC presented a live live-action musical adaptation of Pinocchio starring Mickey Rooney.

In 1958, a live musical version of Hansel and Gretel, with Barbara Cook and Red Buttons, was televised. Both Pinocchio and Hansel and Gretel boasted scores by Alec Wilder. Cole Porter would follow in 1958 with Aladdin, starring Sal Mineo and Basil Rathbone, and that same year, ABC, with the help of Serge Prokofiev and Ogden Nash, combined the elements of musical comedy, marionettes and classical music in a successful special entitled Art Carney Meets Peter and the Wolf.

== Home media ==
Rarely telecast now, The Pied Piper of Hamelin is available on DVD and through online streaming services, but there has never been a restoration. The DVD was reissued in 2004 by Digiview Productions. It is now in the public domain.

== Legacy ==
Johnson's performance remained so fondly remembered that he played a Piper-like criminal called The Minstrel who also spoke in rhyme on the 1966 TV series Batman. During the same year Johnson's television version of the Piper was released to theaters.
