= American Repertory Theater of Western New York =

American Repertory Theater of Western New York is a 501(c)3 theatre company located in Buffalo, New York. Established in 2007 by Matthew LaChiusa, the company produces contemporary & classic comedies including Greater Tuna and Laughter on the 23rd Floor, musicals such as Floyd Collins, premieres of new plays such as Fred's Requiem, well-known dramas such as The Gin Game, Killer Joe and "Heathers: The Musical". The theatre also showcases the work of local Buffalo playwrights and other new playwrights through One-Act Showcase the 2010 Young Playwrights Festival. American Repertory Theater of WNY has also highlighted Western New York playwrights through showcases requesting writers to base their material on songs written by contemporary musicians such as the 2018 "Rain Dogs Project" that featured works based on the music of Tom Waits.

After the COVID 19 pandemic shut down American Repertory Theater of WNY in March 2020, the company reopened doors in September 2021 to present original works by Western New York playwrights, including Artie Award winner, Mark Humphrey. The company resumed operations with Humphrey's "Speed of Dark" and scheduled an additional three other productions, featuring the works of Western New York Playwrights, for the 2021-22 theatrical season. These works included the October 2021 world premier of James A Marzo's "Something Wicked", the March 2022 "Fall From the Grace of God" showcase with Western New York playwrights, Mark C Lloyd, James A Marzo, John Snodgrass, Karen McDonald, Jennifer Tromble, Monish Bhatacharayya, Matthew LaChiusa, Timothy Joyce, and John F Kennedy crafting short plays based on the music of The Pogues. The May 2022 world premiere of Matthew LaChiusa's "The Paradigm Bomb". was postponed to September 2022 due to the tragic events surrounding the Jefferson Street Tops Supermarket shootings.

American Repertory Theater of WNY continued with the company's artistic vision of producing Western New Your based playwrights in the 2022-23 season. World premiere works included the remounting of the postponed "The Paradigm Bomb" by Matthew LaChiusa in September 2022, Justin Karcher's "The Birth of Santa" in December 2023, multiple writers including j Snodgrass Ellen Scherer-Falank, Samatha Marchant, Suzanne Hibbard, Matthew Boyle, and Michael Frannelli were featured in the company's showcased "Mercy Seat" (one-acts based on the music of Nick Cave), and finishing up the season with local playwright j Snodgrass' "Rust and Redemption".

In 2024-25, American Repertory Theater of Western New York continued the company's mission to produce local playwrights with world premieres of Western New York playwrights including Mark Humphrey "The Break Song", Lara Haberberger's adaptation of William Shakespeare's Merchant of Venice entitled "Shylock", Bella Poynton's "The Mighty Maisie", and Matthew LaChiusa's "The Informer" (an adaptation of Liam O'Flahety's 1923 novel of the same name). All four plays were nominated for Buffalo theater excellence by the Artie Award voting committee with LaChiusa's "The Informer" winning the Emmanuel Fried Award for Best New Play.

The company's stated mission is "to produce both classic and contemporary theatrical works and support a new generation of playwrights...[and to] serve as a catalyst for community dialogue and action that will result in sustained economic growth." The recent 2021 revisions to the mission statement: "The mission of the American Repertory Theater of WNY is two-fold. First, the mandate of The American Repertory Theater of WNY is to produce both classic & contemporary theatrical works, and support a new generation of playwrights. These productions are purposefully created to embody innovation, diversity, and inclusivity, thereby expanding the cultural and intellectual experience of the theatergoer. Second, the American Repertory Theater of WNY will serve as a catalyst for community dialogue and action that will result in sustained economic growth and increase the collaboration within all sectors of our community"

Throughout the company's 17 seasons, American Repertory Theater of WNY received 23 nominations for theater excellence, and won 4 local awards "The Arties" for theatrical productions.

American Repertory Theater of WNY is currently located on 545 Elmwood Avenue, Buffalo New York.
