= June Bride =

1948 film by Bretaigne Windust

- Theatrical release poster
- Directed by: Bretaigne Windust
- Screenplay by: Ranald MacDougall
- Based on: Feature for June; 1944 play by Graeme Lorimer; Sarah Lorimer; Elaine Tighe
- Produced by: Henry Blanke
- Starring: Bette Davis; Robert Montgomery; Fay Bainter; Betty Lynn
- Cinematography: Ted D. McCord
- Edited by: Owen Marks
- Music by: David Buttolph
- Production company: Warner Bros. Pictures
- Release date: October 29, 1948
- Running time: 96 minutes
- Country: United States
- Language: English
- Budget: $2,021,000
- Box office: $2,434,000 $1.5 million (US/Canada rentals)

June Bride is a 1948 American comedy film directed by Bretaigne Windust. The screenplay, which was based on the unproduced play Feature for June by Eileen Tighe and Graeme Lorimer, was nominated for the Writers Guild of America Award for Best Written American Comedy. The film starred Bette Davis and Robert Montgomery. The Warner Bros. Pictures release marked the screen debut of Debbie Reynolds, although her appearance was uncredited.

== Plot ==
Foreign correspondent Carey Jackson returns to New York City when his newspaper's Vienna office is closed and is offered a job on a women's magazine called Home Life. He accepts the position only because it will put him in daily contact with editor Linda Gilman, whom he once loved. Linda is averse to the idea because of his leaving her three years earlier, but agrees to hire him if he will keep their relationship on a strictly professional level.

The two head for the Brinker home in Crestville, Indiana, to prepare a feature story about eldest daughter Jeanne's wedding to Bud Mitchell for the June issue. Linda wants Carey to write a simple story about the young couple, but he insists on looking for an angle, which presents itself in the form of Jeanne's younger sister Barbara (nicknamed "Boo"), who confesses she always has been in love with Bud, the brother of Jeanne's former beau Jim, who was dumped by Jeanne when he joined the Army. At first Carey proposes they ask an officer he knows to order Jim home for the wedding, but thinks better of it, knowing he will lose his job if the wedding plans are disrupted. Boo, however, secretly telephones Carey's friend and arranges a leave for Jim.

Complications ensue when Jim arrives home and Carey tries to get rid of him while Linda, unaware of the reality of the situation, intervenes and makes him stay. Jim and Jeanne elope, Linda fires Carey, Carey feigns interest in Boo to make Bud jealous, and the scheme succeeds, with Bud proposing to Boo. Despite losing his job, Carey writes his story, Linda realizes he always knew the truth about the couples, and the two reconcile.

== Cast ==
- Bette Davis as Linda Gilman
- Robert Montgomery as Carey Jackson
- Fay Bainter as Paula Winthrop
- Betty Lynn as Barbara ("Boo") Brinker
- Tom Tully as Whitman Brinker
- Barbara Bates as Jeanne Brinker
- Jerome Cowan as Carleton Towne
- Mary Wickes as Rosemary McNally
- Raymond Roe as Bud Mitchell
- Ray Montgomery as Jim Mitchell

== Production ==
Paramount Pictures also considered producing a film version of Tighe and Lorimer's play which Tighe, the editor of House and Garden, had considered adapting into a stage musical.

Bette Davis wanted either Dennis Morgan or Jack Carson for her co-star, but director Windust and producer Henry Blanke convinced her to accept Robert Montgomery as her leading man, arguing he had a larger fan base. Blanke later admitted they believed the mid-forties Montgomery would make 40-year-old Davis look younger, but after watching the rushes, he realized the casting achieved the opposite effect, with Davis making Montgomery look younger.

June Bride was filmed during the 1948 Presidential campaign. A line of dialogue delivered by Mary Wickes referring to the desperately-needed refurbishment of the old-fashioned Brinker home, a dowdy house crammed full of Victoriana kitsch, was filmed twice, once as "How can I convert this McKinley stinker into a Dewey modern?" and the second time with the name Truman substituted for Dewey. When the film opened in New York City in late October, Dewey seemed a sure win, so the Dewey line was retained. When Truman unexpectedly won the election, a revised reel was sent to theaters. Davis, a staunch Truman supporter, sent Montgomery, who had headed the Hollywood Republican Committee to elect Dewey, a gloating telegram.

The film's success proved to be an oasis for Davis and Warner Brothers; her previous two pictures were box-office disappointments. It was the first comedy film Davis had made since 1941. In that year, she starred in two comedies: The Bride Came C.O.D. and The Man Who Came to Dinner. As a result, Davis was given a new, four-picture contract with a salary of $10,285 a week, making her the highest-paid woman in the United States at the time. June Bride was also reunion for Davis and two prominent cast members - Fay Bainter, who in 1938, along with Davis, won an Oscar for Jezebel, and Mary Wickes, who was featured in both The Man Who Came to Dinner in 1941 and Now, Voyager in 1942. In addition, the two young actresses who played the Brinker sisters - Barbara Bates and Betty Lynn - were also cast in two future Bette Davis films. Although she had no scenes with Davis, Barbara Bates was memorably featured in the last scene of the classic 1950 Twentieth-Century-Fox Oscar-winning film All About Eve as Phoebe, a young ruthless, opportunistic actress very much like Eve Harrington (played by Anne Baxter). In 1949, Betty Lynn was cast as Davis's daughter in the RKO film Payment on Demand, filmed that year but not released until 1951. June Bride was the penultimate Warner Brothers film for Bette Davis. In 1949, Davis made Beyond the Forest against her will and after the film was completed, she and Warner Brothers parted company after eighteen years.

Davis reprised her role of Linda Gilman in an August 29, 1949, Lux Radio Theatre broadcast co-starring James Stewart as Carey Jackson. Irene Dunne and Fred MacMurray assumed the roles in a second Lux adaptation on December 28, 1953, and Marguerite Chapman and Jerome Thor starred in a Lux Video Theatre telecast on August 25, 1955.

== Critical reception ==
In his review in The New York Times, Bosley Crowther described the film as "a delightful vehicle [and] a sophisticated thing, largely dependent for its humors upon a complex of wry attitudes...[It is] also a pretty solid story of good old home-town folks, never too soggy with sentiment and just a shade satiric around the edge." William Brogdon of Variety wrote the film is "a sometimes subtle, sometimes wacky takeoff on home magazines and human nature. It has a starting hurdle as characters are set up, but once on its way never lets itself or the audience down. Bretaigne Windust's direction is always lively and extremely able at milking a line or situation, whether satire or antic, in filming the potent script by Ranald MacDougall." Time magazine wrote "Thanks largely to some bright dialogue and an artful performance by Robert Montgomery, this is the best Bette Davis picture in some time."

== Box office ==
According to Warner Bros records, the film earned $1,882,000 domestically and $552,000 foreign.
