= Brüka Theatre =

Coordinates: 39°31′32″N 119°48′47″W

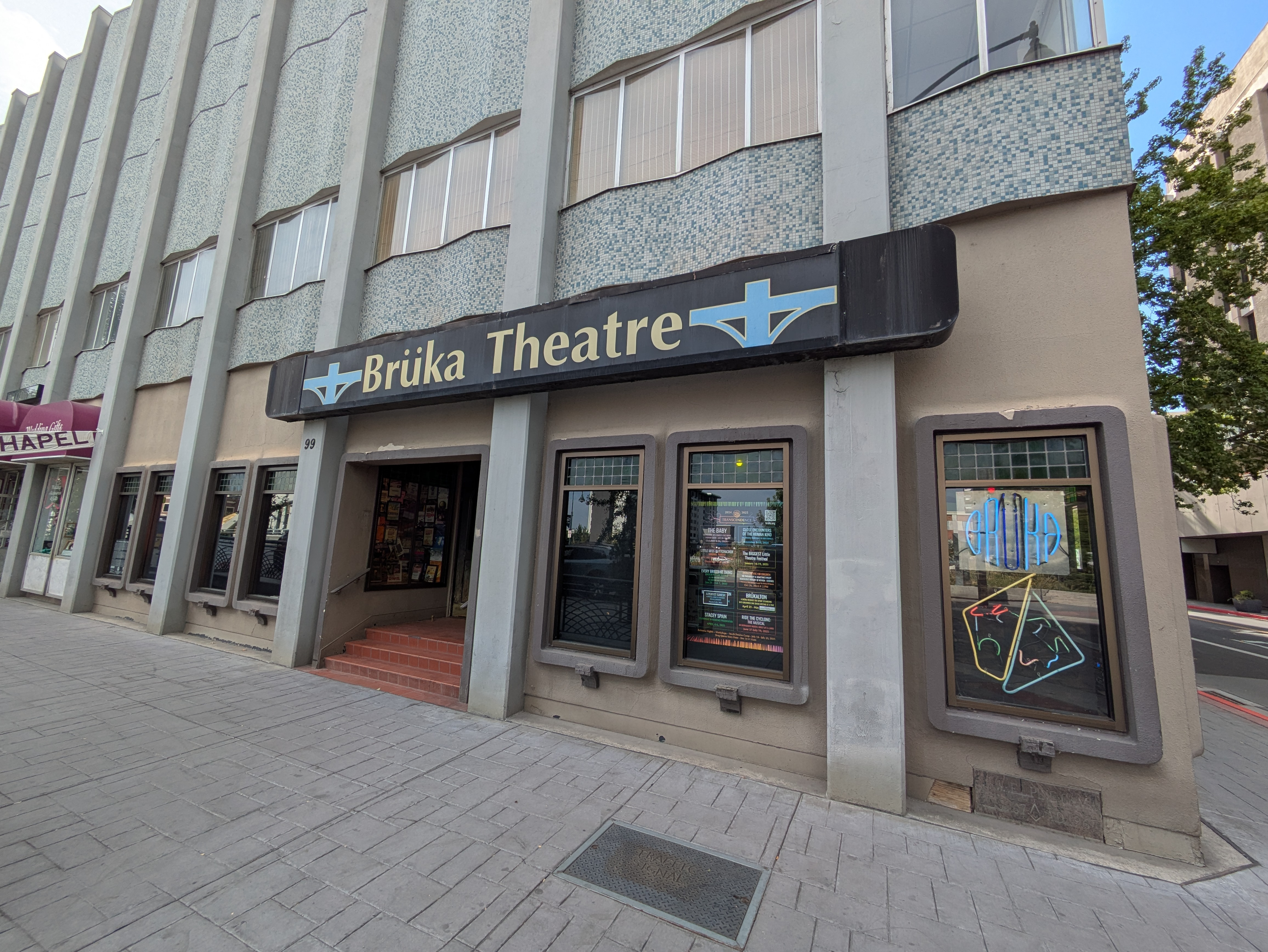
- Interactive map of Brüka Theatre
- Address: Reno, Nevada; United States

Construction
- Opened: 1992

Brüka Theatre is a Reno-based theater group which was founded in 1992, and is one of the main live theaters in northern Nevada. The theatre is named after the German expressionist artist group, Die Brücke.

Most plays by Brüka are produced on their Main Stage, but several other productions are held in Sub-Brüka, their venue for less traditional fare, and other special events. This theater also performs touring theater for children, such as an adaptation of James Thurber's Many Moons.

== History ==
When it first opened, Brüka Theatre focused more on shows for children, both those including child performers and intended for children audience. By 1996, however, the theatre started producing shows in different genres, including avant-garde ones. In 1999, Brüka Theatre also merged with another theatre company, Renaissance Projects.

== Building ==
The theatre usually performs their work in either the Main Stage or the Sub-Brüka.

== Productions ==
Brüka Theatre has performed a large body of work since the beginning of its operations. Several of them includes: Victor/Victoria, The Legend of Georgia McBride, and The Crucible.

== Other works ==
In collaboration with Good Luck Macbeth and Reno Little Theater, Brüka Theatre also operates a YouTube Channel called Ghost Light TV since March 2020, partly due to COVID-19 pandemic closures.
