= Janis Paige =

American actress and singer (1922–2024)

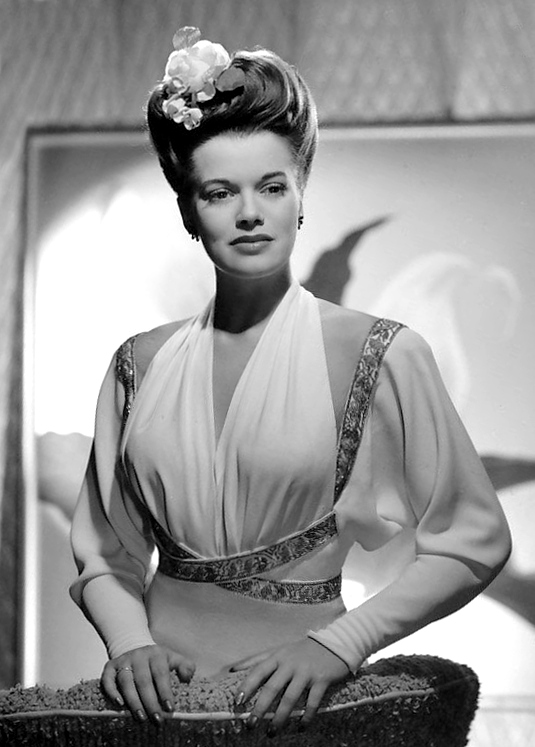
- Paige in 1944
- Born: Donna Mae Tjaden; September 16, 1922; Tacoma, Washington, U.S.
- Died: June 2, 2024 (aged 101); Los Angeles, California, U.S.
- Occupations: Actress, singer
- Years active: 1944–2001
- Known for: Pajama Game, It's Always Jan
- Spouses: Frank Martinelli Jr. (m. 1947; div. 1951); Arthur Stander (m. 1956; div. 1957); Ray Gilbert (m. 1962; died 1976)

Janis Paige (born Donna Mae Tjaden; September 16, 1922 – June 2, 2024) was an American actress and singer. With a career spanning nearly 60 years, she was one of the last surviving stars from the Golden Age of Hollywood.

Born in Tacoma, Washington, Paige began singing in local amateur shows at the age of five. After high school, she moved to Los Angeles, where she became a singer at the Hollywood Canteen during World War II, as well as posing as a pin-up model.

This led to a film contract with Warner Bros., although she later left the studio to pursue live theatre work, appearing in a number of Broadway shows. She continued to alternate between film and theatre work for much of her career. Beginning in the mid-1950s, she also made numerous television appearances, as well as starring in her own sitcom It's Always Jan.

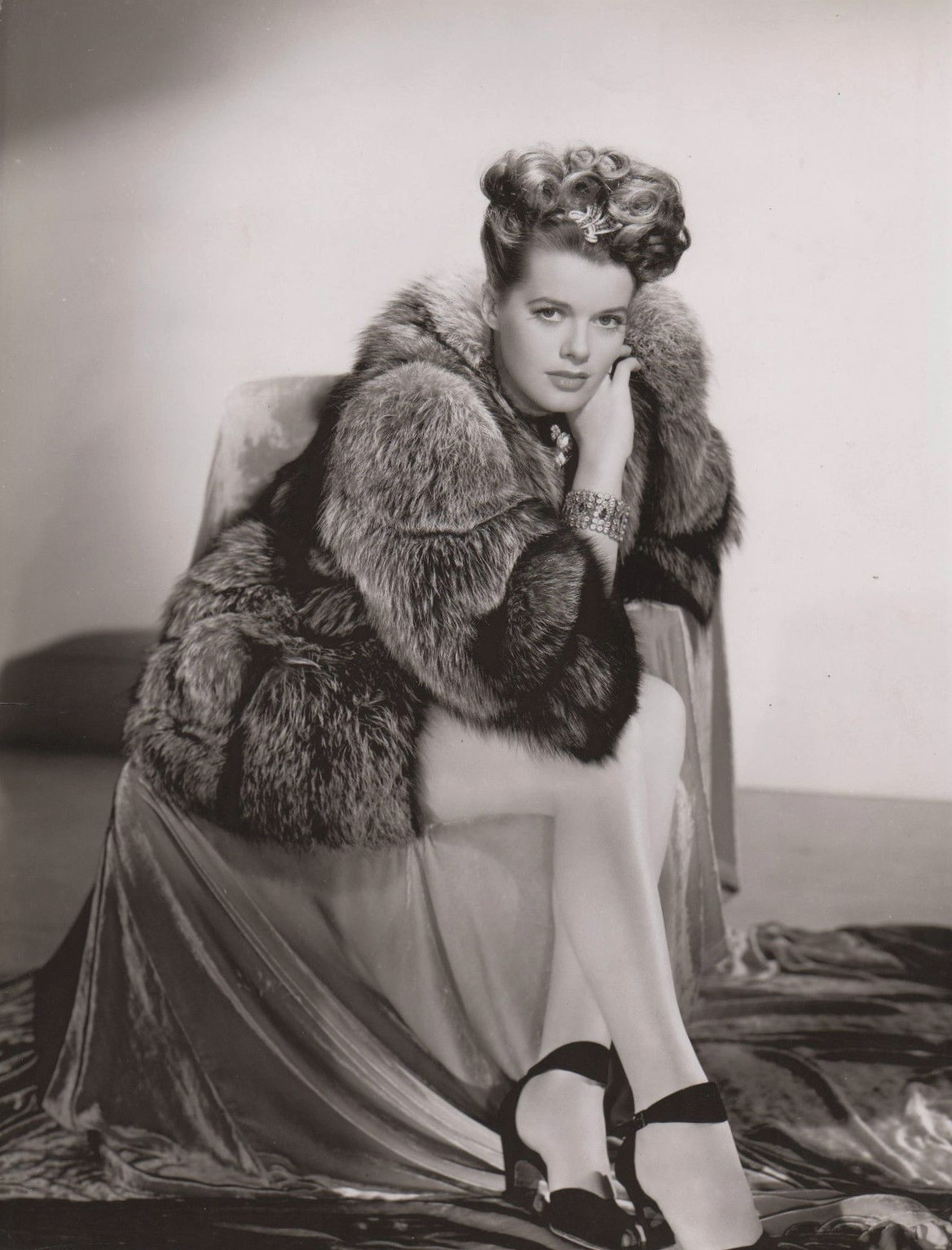
Janis Paige in 1944

== Early life ==
Paige was born Donna Mae Tjaden in Tacoma, Washington, the elder child of Hazel Leah (née Simmons) and George S. Tjaden on September 16, 1922, primarily of Norwegian, German, English, and Cornish descent. She had a younger sister named Betty Jane (June 21, 1925, Tacoma, Washington – July 16, 2020, Windsor Locks, Connecticut), who was known by her married name of Betty Jane Finney.

Paige began singing in public at age five in local amateur shows. She moved, with her mother and sister, to Los Angeles after graduating from high school, and she was hired as a singer at the Hollywood Canteen during World War II. Courtesy of MGM, she helped entertain the troops in February 1944 at Camp Roberts, California, starring in Rio Rita along with Ann Ayars. During the war, United States Army Air Forces pilots flying the P-61 Black Widow chose her as their "Black Widow Girl". In appreciation, she posed as a pin-up model, dressed in an appropriate costume.

== Film roles ==
The Hollywood Canteen was a studio-sponsored club for members of the military. A Warner Bros. agent saw her there, saw her potential and signed her to a contract. She began co-starring in low-budget musicals, often paired with Dennis Morgan or Jack Carson. She co-starred in Romance on the High Seas (1948), the film in which Doris Day made her movie debut. Paige later co-starred in adventures and dramas, in which she felt out of place. Following her role in Two Gals and a Guy (1951), she decided to leave Hollywood.

== Broadway ==
Paige appeared on Broadway, and she was a huge hit in a 1951 comedy-mystery play Remains to Be Seen. She also toured successfully as a cabaret singer. In April 1947, she was crowned "Miss Damsite" and participated at the ground-breaking ceremony for the McNary Dam, on the Columbia River, alongside Oregon Governor Earl Snell and Mrs. Cornelia Morton McNary (the widow of Senator Charles McNary).

Stardom came in 1954 with her role as Babe in the Broadway musical The Pajama Game. She was on the December 1954 cover of Esquire, where she was featured in a seductive pose taken by American photographer Maxwell Frederic Coplan. For the screen version, the studio wanted one major movie star to guarantee the film's success, so John Raitt's role of Sid was offered to Frank Sinatra, who would have been paired with Paige. When Sinatra declined, the producers offered Paige's role of Babe to Doris Day, who accepted and was paired with Raitt.

== Return to film ==
After six years away, Paige returned to Hollywood in Silk Stockings (1957), which starred Fred Astaire and Cyd Charisse, the Doris Day/David Niven comedy Please Don't Eat the Daisies (1960), and as a love-starved married neighbor in Bachelor in Paradise (1961) with Bob Hope. A rare dramatic role was as Marion, an institutionalized prostitute, in The Caretakers (1963).

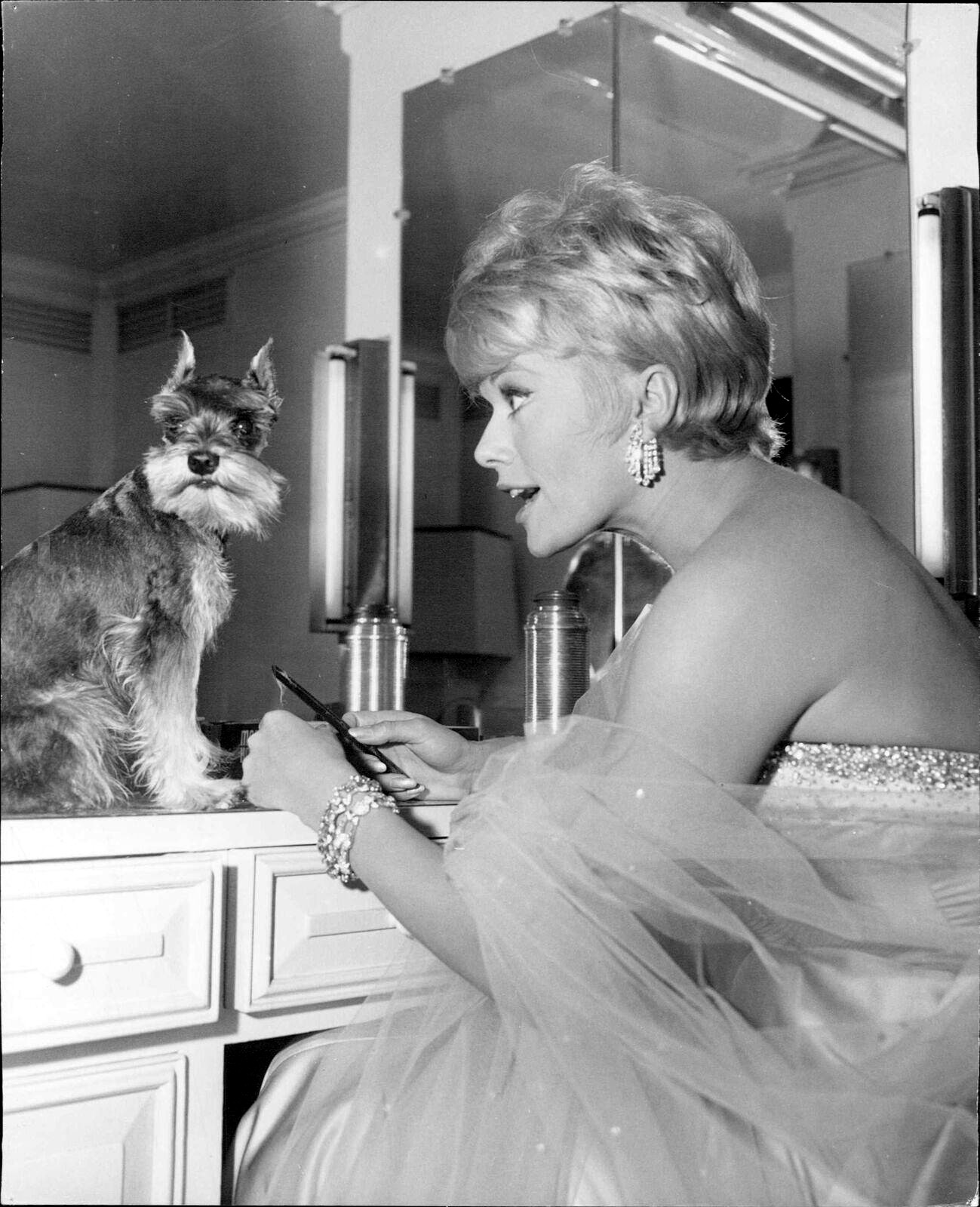
Paige with dog Squeakie in 1960

== Musical theater ==
Paige returned to Broadway in 1963 in the short-lived Here's Love. In 1968, when after nearly two years Angela Lansbury left the Broadway production of the musical Mame to take the show on a limited U.S. tour, Paige was the star chosen to be the first Broadway replacement, and she admired the character, saying, "She's a free soul. She can be down, but never out. She's unbigoted. She says what she thinks with a kind of marvelous honesty, which is the only way to say anything."

Paige appeared in touring productions of musicals such as Annie Get Your Gun, Applause, Sweet Charity, Ballroom, Gypsy: A Musical Fable, and Guys and Dolls. In 1984, she was back on Broadway with Kevin McCarthy in a nonmusical play, Alone Together. The tryout tour gave Paige her first experience of the eastern summer-stock circuit, where she said audiences "laughed so hard you just had to wait", and she enjoyed the role so much, she played it again in 1988 at the Coconut Grove Playhouse, this time with Robert Reed.

== Television host and roles ==
During the 1955–1956 television season, Paige starred in her own sitcom It's Always Jan as Janis Stewart, a widowed mother.

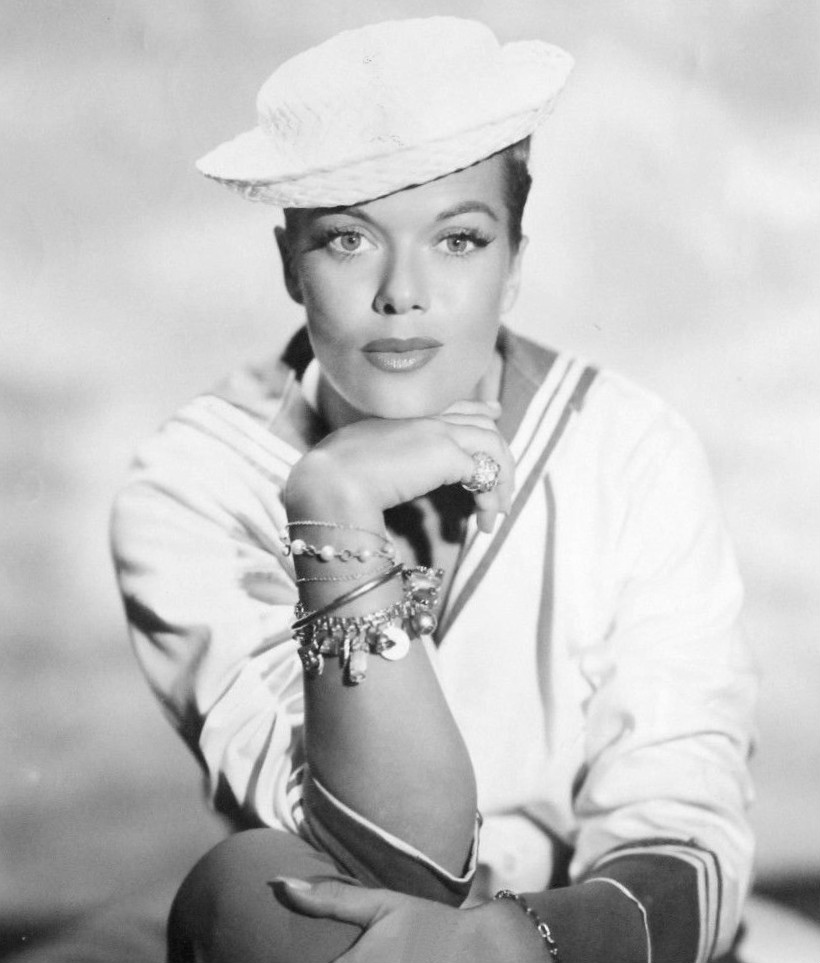
Janis Paige in It's Always Jan (1955–1956)

Paige made her live dramatic TV debut June 27, 1957, in "The Latch Key" on Lux Video Theatre. She appeared as troubadour Hallie Martin in The Fugitive episode "Ballad for a Ghost" (1964). She also had a recurring role as Auntie V, Tom Bradford's sister, in Eight Is Enough.

Paige appeared as a waitress named Denise in both the seventh and ninth seasons of All in the Family. In her first appearance, she has a flirtation with Archie Bunker that threatens to become serious.

Paige appeared on episodes of 87th Precinct; Trapper John, M.D.; Columbo; Night Court; and Caroline in the City; and in the 1975 television movie John O'Hara's Gibbsville (also known as The Turning Point of Jim Malloy). In 1982, she appeared on St. Elsewhere as a female flasher who stalked the hallways of the hospital to "cheer up" the male patients. She also appeared on a season 11 episode of Happy Days, as a roadside diner waitress named Angela who may or may not be Fonzie's long lost mother; Fonzie has a heartfelt talk with Angela, and it is left up to the viewer to determine if she is his mother or not – though the emotions exhibited by her character throughout the scene indicate that she is, but does not want to be found out. In the 1980s and 1990s, she was seen on several soap operas, including Capitol (1987, as Sam Clegg's first wife, Laureen), General Hospital (1989–1990, as Katharine Delafield's flashy Aunt Iona, a lady counterfeiter), and Santa Barbara (1990–1993, replacing Dame Judith Anderson as matriarch Minx Lockridge).

== Honors ==
Paige was given a star in the Motion Picture section of the Hollywood Walk of Fame at 6624 Hollywood Boulevard on February 9, 1960.

== Personal life and death ==
Paige was married three times. She married Frank Louis Martinelli Jr., a restaurateur, in 1947; they divorced in 1951. She married Arthur Stander, a television writer and creator of It's Always Jan, in 1956 and divorced him the next year. Paige married composer and music publisher Ray Gilbert in 1962. They remained married until his death on March 3, 1976. She had no children.

In 2001, Paige found that her voice was cracking with nearly irreparable vocal-cord damage. She went to a singing teacher a friend recommended. Paige's voice ended up worse with her not being able to talk at all. "He literally took my voice away," she said. "I lost all my top voice. I couldn't hold a pitch for a second. Finally, I couldn't make a sound. He said that this will all come back. It didn't." Another singing teacher told her to go to the voice clinic at Vanderbilt University Medical Center in Nashville. "There were bits of skin hanging off my vocal cords", she said. "They told me to go home and not talk for three months." She finally was introduced by a doctor to another voice teacher, Bruce Eckstut, who helped her regain her speaking voice and singing voice.

In 2017, at age 95, Paige wrote a guest column for The Hollywood Reporter in which she stated that Alfred S. Bloomingdale had attempted to rape her when she was 22 years old. She alleges that she was sexually assaulted after being lured into Bloomingdale's apartment under false pretenses.

Paige turned 100 on September 16, 2022, and died at her Los Angeles home on June 2, 2024, at the age of 101.

== Filmography ==
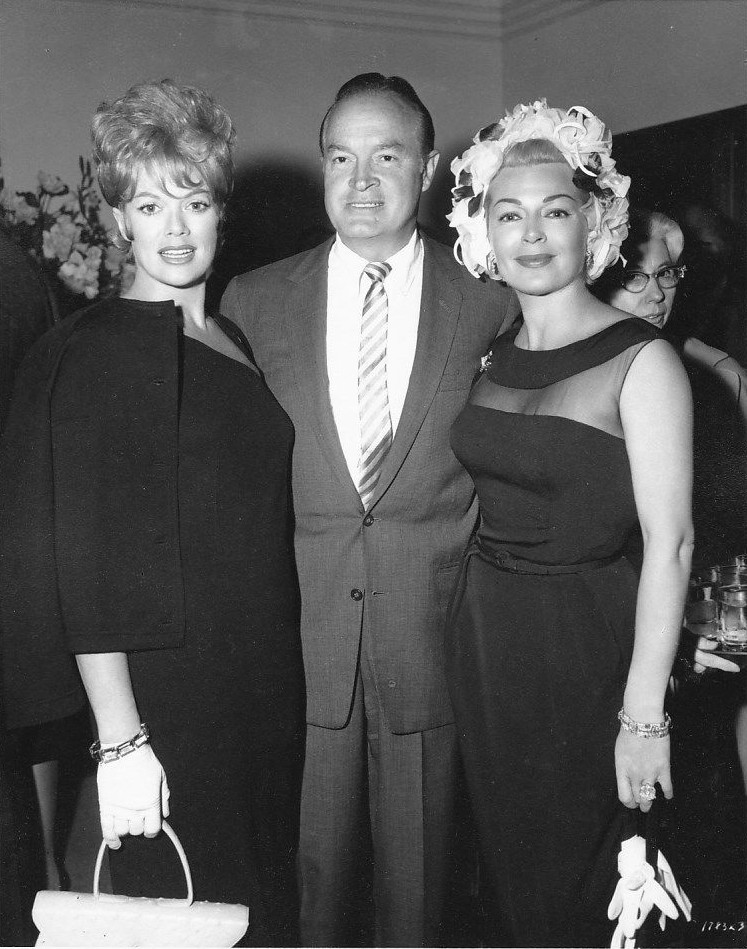
Paige (pictured left), with Lana Turner and Bob Hope in 1960

=== Film ===
Year	Title	Role	Notes
1944	Bathing Beauty	Janis	musical film directed by George Sidney
1944	Hollywood Canteen	Studio Guide	musical film directed by Delmer Daves
1946	Her Kind of Man	Georgia King	film noir directed by Frederick De Cordova
1946	Of Human Bondage	Sally Athelny	drama film directed by Edmund Goulding; the second screen adaptation of W. Somerset Maugham's 1915 novel with the 1934 Pre-Code drama film directed by John Cromwell
1946	Two Guys from Milwaukee	Polly	comedy film directed by David Butler.
1946	The Time, the Place and the Girl	Sue Jackson	musical film directed by David Butler; known as in these languages: Austrian dialect of German: Der Himmel voller Geigen, Finnish: Aika, paikka ja tyttö, Swedish: Här kommer Broadway, German: Krieg nach Noten, Italian: L'ora, il luogo e la ragazza, French: La fille et le garçon, and Danish: Tiden, stedet og pigen!.
1947	Love and Learn	Jackie	comedy film directed Frederick de Cordova
1947	Cheyenne	Emily Carson	western film directed by Raoul Walsh
1947	Always Together	Polly	comedy film directed Frederick de Cordova; uncredited
1948	Winter Meeting	Peggy Markham	drama film directed by Bretaigne Windust and written by Catherine Turney from the novel of the same title by Grace Zaring Stone under the pseudonym Ethel Vance
1948	Wallflower	Joy Linnett	comedy film directed by Frederick de Cordova
1948	Romance on the High Seas	Elvira Kent	musical film directed by Michael Curtiz; known as It's Magic in the United Kingdom
1948	One Sunday Afternoon	Virginia Brush	musical film directed by Raoul Walsh; based on James Hagan's play of the same name, which was produced on Broadway in 1933
1949	The Younger Brothers	Kate Shepherd	western directed by Edwin L. Marin
1949	The House Across the Street	Kit Williams	comedy film directed by Richard L. Bare
1950	Fugitive Lady	Barbara Clementi	crime–drama film directed by Sidney Salkow and Marino Girolami; known as La strada buia in Italian; based on the novel Dark Road by Doris Miles Disney
1950	This Side of the Law	Nadine Taylor	film noir directed by Richard L. Bare
1951	Mister Universe	Lorraine	comedy film directed by Joseph Lerner
1951	Two Gals and a Guy	Della Oliver / Sylvia Latour	comedy film directed by Alfred E. Green; also known as Baby and Me
1957	Silk Stockings	Peggy Dayton	musical film adaptation of the 1955 stage musical of the same name, which was an adaptation of the film Ninotchka
1960	Please Don't Eat the Daisies	Deborah Vaughn	comedy film directed by Charles Walters and partly inspired by the book of the same name by Jean Kerr
1961	Bachelor in Paradise	Dolores Jynson	comedy film directed by Jack Arnold
1963	Follow the Boys	Liz Bradville	comedy film directed by Richard Thorpe
1963	The Caretakers	Marion	drama film produced and directed by Hall Bartlett and based on the novel of the same name by Dariel Telfer
1967	Welcome to Hard Times	Adah	western film directed by Burt Kennedy and based on the novel of the same name by E.L. Doctorow
1994	Natural Causes	Mrs. MacCarthy	thriller film directed by James Becket

=== Documentary/short subjects ===
Year	Title	Role	Notes
1944	I Won't Play	Kim Karol / Sally	short film directed by Crane Wilbur
1947	So You Want to Be in Pictures	Herself	uncredited; short film written and directed by Richard L. Bare
2003	Broadway: The Golden Age, by the Legends Who Were There	Herself	documentary film by Rick McKay
2021	Journey to Royal: A WWII Rescue Mission	Herself	documentary film by Christopher Johnson and Mariana Coku

=== Television ===
Year	Title	Role	Notes
1949–1950	Bonnie Maid's Versatile Varieties	herself	contract role; "Bonnie Maid" dressed in plaid kilts for sponsor Bonnie Maid Linoleum
1953	Plymouth Playhouse	guest	episode: "Baby and Me"
1954	Philip Morris Playhouse	guest	episode: "Make Me Happy, Make Me Sad"
1955–1956	It's Always Jan	Jan Stewart	26 episodes
1957	Lux Video Theatre	Iris	episode: "The Latch Key"
1957	Studio 57	guest	Episode: "One of the Family"
1958	Schlitz Playhouse	Bebe Evans	episode: "Home Again"
1958	Shower of Stars	herself	episode: "Episode #4.7"
1958	Roberta	Scharwenka	TV film directed by Ed Greenberg and Dick McDonough
1959	The Red Skelton Show	School Teacher	episode: "Bashful Clem"
1959	Westinghouse Desilu Playhouse	The Redhead	episode: "Chez Rouge"
1959	Andy Williams Show	herself	July 7, 1959, episode
1960	The Secret World of Eddie Hodges	Circus Star	TV film and musical directed by Norman Jewison
1960	Maisie	Maisie Ravier	Usold television pilot directed by Edward Ludwig and based on Wilson Collison's novel Dark Dame, aired on the anthology series New Comedy Showcase.
1960	Hooray for Love	leading actress	TV film and musical directed by Burt Shevelove
1960	The Ann Sothern Show	Edith	episode: "The Girls"
1961	Wagon Train	Nellie Jefferson	episode: "The Nellie Jefferson Story"
1961	The Dinah Shore Chevy Show	Kathy Hewitt	episode: "Happiest Day"
1962	87th Precinct	Cheryl Anderson	episode: "Girl in the Case"
1962	Alcoa Premiere	Connie Rankin	episode: "Blues for a Hanging"
1962	The Red Skelton Show	Mrs. Cavendish	episode: "Ten Baby Fingers and 12 Baby Toes"
1963	The Dick Powell Theater	Lavern	episode: "Last of the Private Eyes"
1964	Burke's Law	Sharon McCauley	episode: "Who Killed the Swinger on a Hook?"
1964	The Fugitive	Hallie Martin	episode: "Ballad for a Ghost"
1965	The Red Skelton Show	Hatta Mari	episode: "Dial 'O' for Nothing"
1969	Roberta	Scharwenka	TV film directed by John Kennedy and Dick McDonough
1971	Sarge	Marian Hart	episode: "Psst! Wanna Buy a Dirty Picture?"
1972	Columbo	Goldie Williamson	episode: "Blueprint for Murder"
1972	Banacek	Lydia	episode: "To Steal a King"
1973	Mannix	Georgia Durian	episode: "A Way to Dusty Death"
1974	Police Story	Harry's Wife	episode: "A Dangerous Age"
1975	Gibbsville	Lonnie	episode: "The Turning Point of Jim Malloy"; originally a TV film co–written and directed by Frank D. Gilroy
1975	Police Story	Irene	episode: "The Return of Joe Forrester"; pilot for Joe Forrester; later a TV film retitled Cop on the Beat
1975	Doc	guest	episode: "The Other Woman"
1975	Police Story	Mrs. Driscoll	episode: "Vice: 24 Hours"
1976	The Mary Tyler Moore Show	Charlene Maguire	episode: "Menage-a-Lou"
1976	All in the Family	Denise	2 episodes
1976	All's Fair	Barbara	episode: "Jealousy"
1976	The Nancy Walker Show	guest	episode: "Dear Dr. Dora"
1976–1977	Lanigan's Rabbi	Kate Lanigan	5 episodes
1977	The Betty White Show	Wilma	episode: "Mitzi's Cousin"
1977–1980	Eight Is Enough	Aunt Vivian	5 episodes
1978	The Love Boat	Phyllis Morrison	episode: "A Selfless Love / The Nubile Nurse / Parents Know Best"
1978	Alice	Ruth	episode: "The Cuban Connection"
1978	Fantasy Island	Charlotte	episode: "The Beachcomber / The Last Whodunit"
1978	Hawaii Five-O	Minnie Cahoon	episode: "The Case Against Philip Christie"
1978	Charlie's Angels	Joan Sayers	episode: "Angels Ahoy"
1978	The Rockford Files	Miriam	episode: "A Three-Day Affair with a Thirty-Day Escrow"
1978	All in the Family	Denise	episode: "Return of the Waitress"
1980	Valentine Magic on Love Island	Madge	TV film directed by Earl Bellamy
1980	Angel on My Shoulder	Dolly Blaine	TV film directed by John Berry
1981	Fantasy Island	Mabel Martin	episode: "High Off the Hog / Reprisal"
1981	Happy Days	Angela	episode: "Mother and Child Reunion"
1981	Bret Maverick	Mandy Packer	2 episodes
1981	Flamingo Road	Jenny	episode: "The Powers That Be"
1981	Lewis & Clark	Rose	episode: "The Family Affair"
1982	Too Close for Comfort	Irene Miller	episode: "The Last Weekend"
1982	Romance Theatre	Estelle	5 episodes
1983	Matt Houston	Lauren Calder	episode: "The Purrfect Crime"
1983	St. Elsewhere	Dee Mackaluso	episode: "Remission"
1983	Gun Shy	Nettie McCoy	6 episodes; series based upon The Apple Dumpling Gang films
1983	Fantasy Island	Brian's Mother	episode: "The Devil Stick / Touch and Go"
1983	The Other Woman	Mrs. Barnes	TV film directed by Melville Shavelson
1983	Baby Makes Five	Blanche Riddle	5 episodes
1983	Trauma Center	guest	episode: "Trail's End"
1984	Night Court	Eleanor Brandon	episode: "Welcome Back, Momma"
1984	No Man's Land	Maggie Hodiak	TV film directed by Rod Holcomb
1984	We Think the World Is Round	Nina (voice)	TV film directed by Rudy Larriva
1985	Rockhopper	Helen Larabee	TV film directed by Bill Bixby
1985–1986	Trapper John, M.D.	Catherine Hackett	15 episodes
1987	Capitol	Laureen Clegg	episode: "Episode #1.1268"
1989	Mission: Impossible	Katherine Foster	episode: "The Haunting"
1989	General Hospital	Aunt Iona Huntington	recurring role
1990	Shades of L.A.	Ruth Lockwood	episode: "Where There's No Will, There's a Weigh-In"
1990–1993	Santa Barbara	Minx Lockridge	106 episodes
1992	Room for Two	Charlotte Agnoletti	episode: "Whose Mouth Is It Anyway?"
1995	Legend	Delilah Pratt	episode: "Clueless in San Francisco"
1997	Caroline in the City	Loretta	episode: "Caroline and the Bad Trip"
2001	Family Law	Ann Fox	episode: "The Quality of Mercy"

== Theater ==
Year	Title	Role	Venue	Notes
1951–1952	Remains to Be Seen	Jody Revere	Morosco Theatre (October 3, 1951 – March 22, 1952)	directed by Bretaigne Windust, written by Howard Lindsay and Russel Crouse, and produced by Leland Hayward
1952	Remains to Be Seen	Jody Revere	National Tour, Chicago, Detroit, Cleveland Summer 1952	
1954–1955	The Pajama Game	Babe Williams	St. James Theatre (May 13, 1954 – June 23, 1955)	directed by George Abbott and Jerome Robbins, written by George Abbott & Richard Bissell, and produced by Frederick Brisson, Robert E. Griffith & Harold S. Prince.; based on the novel 7½ Cents by Richard Bissell
1959	High Button Shoes	Unknown	State Fair of Texas in Dallas at Fair Park	based on the semi-autobiographical novel The Sisters Liked Them Handsome by Stephen Longstreet; written by George Abbott and Stephen Longstreet and directed by Abbott
1963–1964	Here's Love	Doris Walker	Shubert Theatre (October 3, 1963 – July 25, 1964)	directed and produced by Stuart Ostrow and written by Meredith Willson; based on the film Miracle on 34th Street; based on the novel Here's Love by Meredith Willson
1967	Born Yesterday	Billie Dawn	Paper Mill Playhouse, Millburn, NJ	
1967	Sweet Charity	Charity	Kenley Players, Various Ohio Cities Summer 1967	
1968	Mame	Mame Dennis	Winter Garden Theatre (April 1, 1968 – November 30, 1968)	directed by Gene Saks and produced by Fryer, Carr & Harris Inc.; based on the novel Auntie Mame by Patrick Dennis
1969	Mame	Mame Dennis	tour of various U.S. cities	
1970	Gypsy	Rose	Hershey Community Theater (August 17–22, 1970)	with Jack Haskell
1971	Applause	Margo Channing		performed in Johannesburg, South Africa
1973	Born Yesterday	Billie Dawn	Country Dinner Playhouse (July 17, 1973 – August 19, 1973)	
1974	Desk Set	Bunny Watson	Thunderbird Dinner Theatre	directed by Robert Bruce Holley
1974	Gypsy	Rose	national tour	
1975	Annie Get Your Gun	Annie Oakley	national tour	
1975	The Gingerbread Lady	Evy	Candlelight Dinner Playhouse (August 19, 1975–unknown)	replacement for Carolyn Jones
1978	Guys and Dolls	Adelaide	national tour	
1979	Ballroom	Bea	national tour	
1984–1985	Alone Together	Helene Butler	Music Box Theatre (October 21, 1984 – January 12, 1985)	directed by Arnold Mittelman, written by Lawrence Roman, originally produced at the Whole Theatre Company, and produced by Arnold Mittelman and Lynne Peyser
1987	Happy Birthday, Mr. Abbott! or Night of 100 Years	Unknown	Palace Theatre (June 22, 1987)	
1987	The Gingerbread Lady	Evy	Equity Library Theater	directed by Geoffrey C. Shlaes
1988	Alone Together	Helene Butler	Coconut Grove Playhouse, Miami, Florida	
1989	The Gingerbread Lady	Evy	Coconut Grove Playhouse	directed by Jack Allison
