= Blanke =

Blanke or Blancke is a surname. Notable people with the surname include:

== Blanke ==
- Christa Blanke (born 1948), German theologian and animal rights activist
- Detlev Blanke (1941–2016), an interlinguistics lecturer at Humboldt University of Berlin
- Henry Blanke (1901–1981), a German-born film producer who also worked as an assistant director, supervisor, writer, and production manager
- John Blanke (fl. 1501–1511), an African musician in England
- Thomas Blanke (died 1588), Lord Mayor of London
- Wilhelm Blanke (1873–1936), German painter and lithographer
- Dan Blanke (1969– ), Handsome Viking man

== Blancke ==
- Sandrine Blancke (born 1978) a Belgian French actress
- Wilton Blancké (1908–1971), American diplomat

== See also ==
- Blanke (DJ), Australian electronic music producer and DJ
