= Catherine Turney =

American screenwriter

- Born: December 26, 1906; Chicago, Illinois
- Died: September 9, 1998 (aged 91); Sierra Madre, California
- Occupations: Screenwriter, writer
- Writing career
- Years active: 1930s–1970s

Catherine Turney (December 26, 1906 – September 9, 1998) was an American writer and screenwriter. Born in Chicago, Illinois, she was active from the 1930s to the 1970s. She was one of the first women writers to become a contract worker at Warner Brothers, where she worked from 1943 to 1948 on films such as The Man I Love, A Stolen Life, and My Reputation.

== Early life and education ==
Turney and her parents, George W. and Elizabeth Blamer Turney, moved from Chicago to Rome, New York, where she spent most her of her childhood. In 1921, they moved to Pasadena, California.

In the summer of 1926, Turney started working at the Pasadena Playhouse's School of Theatre, where she helped Gilmore Brown prepare for the premiere of Eugene O'Neill's Lazarus Laughed. She later became the director of the Playhouse Workshop and received a scholarship for the School of Theatre, where she graduated in the first class of 1931.

== Early career ==
In the 1930s, she had early success in theater with her plays Bitter Harvest (1936), performed in London, and due to the work's positive reviews and thinking she was English and not American, she was offered a job from MGM. She then worked on the film The Bride Wore Red (1937) which was an adaptation of Ferenc Molnár's unproduced play, The Girl from Trieste, which was later handed to another screenwriter, Joe Mankiewicz. Turney and Waldo Salt, her co-writer, were not given screen credit for the film, but Turney later stated that the film "turned out to be an awful turkey called The Bride Wore Red."

After Bitter Harvest and her experience at MGM, she returned to playwriting and penned My Dear Children (1939), her greatest stage success, which was performed on Broadway and starring John Barrymore. The play was performed 117 times and would have been performed more if Barrymore hadn't grown tired of it.

Turney returned to working at the Pasadena Playhouse until she was offered a job from Warner Brothers.

== Hollywood ==
She was one of the first women writers to become a contract worker at Warner Brothers, where she worked from 1943 to 1948. When asked about why she was hired, Turney stated that due to men being at war, women could be given more opportunities. With this opportunity, Turney wrote characters for big female film stars that were known to be strong and independent women with a sense of character and humor. She became known for writing for some of the biggest stars of the time, such as Rosalind Russell, Ann Sheridan, Ida Lupino, Bette Davis, and Barbara Stanwyck among others.

Turney is probably best known for The Man I Love, A Stolen Life, My Reputation and Mildred Pierce, although uncredited for the latter. When Mildred Pierce was nominated for Best Screenplay Writing at the 1946 Academy Awards, Turney did not receive on-screen credit and therefore was technically never nominated for an Academy Award.

Winter Meeting (1948) was Turney's last film with Warner Brothers as she would later join Paramount Pictures for the writing of No Man of Her Own in 1949. Her last screenplays were both with 20th Century Fox, they were Japanese War Bride and Back from the Dead, the latter being an adaptation of her own novel, The Other One.

== Personal life ==
Turney was married and divorced twice. Her first marriage was to actor Cyril E. Armbrister (1896–1966) from 1931 to 1938 and Clifford Guthrie "George" Reynolds from February 18, 1940, to 1949. She was in a long-term relationship with California artist Lenard Kester, but they never married.

== Later years and death ==
Turney wrote for television from the late 1950s to the early 1960s for shows including: Maverick, General Hospital, Alcoa Presents, and The Wonderful World of Disney.

In the later 1950s, she focused on writing biographies, historical romance novels and television soap operas. The Other One, her first novel published in 1952, was adapted into a film in 1957 under the title Back from the Dead, which she wrote the screenplay for. Perhaps her most recognized biography is Byron's Daughter: A Biography of Elizabeth Medora Leigh about Elizabeth Medora Leigh. It was published in 1972.

Despite the successes in her career, Turney is said to have lived most of her life suffering from financial troubles.

Turney died in her sleep at the age of 92 in her Sierra Madre, California home. She is survived by a nephew and a niece.

== Filmography ==
Year	Title	Studio	Notes
1937	The Bride Wore Red	MGM	Uncredited, based on Ferenc Molnár's novel, The Bride from Trieste
1945	Roughly Speaking	Warner Bros.	Uncredited, based on Louise Randall Pierson's novel, Roughly Speaking
1945	Mildred Pierce	Warner Bros.	Uncredited, adapted from James M. Cain's novel, Mildred Pierce
1946	My Reputation	Warner Bros.	Based on Clare Jaynes' Instruct My Sorrows
1946	One More Tomorrow	Warner Bros.	
1946	Of Human Bondage	Warner Bros.	Based on the novel Of Human Bondage by W. Somerset Maugham
1946	A Stolen Life	Warner Bros.	Based on Karel J. Benes' novel, Uloupeny Zivot
1947	The Man I Love	Warner Bros.	Based on Maritta Wolff's novel, Night Shift
1947	Cry Wolf	Warner Bros.	Based on Marjorie Carleton's novel, Cry Wolf
1948	Winter Meeting	Warner Bros.	Based on Ethel Vance's novel, Winter Meeting
1950	No Man of Her Own	Paramount Pictures	Based on Cornell Woolrich's novel, I Married a Dead Man
1952	Japanese War Bride	20th Century-Fox	Story by Anson Bond, screenplay by Turney
1957	Back from the Dead	20th Century-Fox	Adapted from her novel, The Other One (1952)

Preceded by Terence and Joan Maples	Head Writer of General Hospital; October 7 – 11, 1963	Succeeded by Milton Geiger
