= Winter Meeting =

1948 film by Bretaigne Windust

- Theatrical release poster
- Directed by: Bretaigne Windust
- Written by: Catherine Turney
- Based on: Winter Meeting; 1946 novel by Ethel Vance
- Produced by: Henry Blanke
- Starring: Bette Davis; Jim Davis (billed as James Davis)
- Cinematography: Ernest Haller
- Edited by: Owen Marks
- Music by: Max Steiner
- Distributed by: Warner Bros. Pictures
- Release date: April 7, 1948
- Running time: 104 minutes
- Country: United States
- Language: English
- Budget: $1,927,000
- Box office: $1,083,000

Winter Meeting is a 1948 American drama film directed by Bretaigne Windust and starring Bette Davis and Jim Davis. The screenplay, based on the novel of the same name by Grace Zaring Stone (under the pseudonym Ethel Vance), was written by Catherine Turney.

== Plot summary ==
Disenchanted poet Susan Grieve, escorted by her friend Stacy Grant, meets embittered World War II naval hero Lieutenant Slick Novak at a Manhattan restaurant where a dinner party is being held in his honor. He is more interested in Susan than his blind date Peggy Markham and offers to take her home at the end of the evening. The two become better acquainted over coffee in Susan's apartment, and she initially resists but then succumbs to his charms when he tries to kiss her.

The following day, Slick returns to see Susan, and she spontaneously invites him to spend the remainder of his leave with her at her country house. In this setting, the two share secrets about each other, Susan telling him about her clergyman father's descent into insanity and eventual suicide, and how it estranged her from her mother, he confessing his longtime desire to become a priest and revealing the guilt he feels about surviving the war while others died in battle.

Slick returns to the city alone, and Susan later accidentally runs into him and Peggy in the restaurant where they first met. The following day, he visits Susan's apartment and suggests they try to make their relationship work, but she urges him to reconsider the priesthood and the two part ways. Susan, having learned her mother has been hospitalized, then calls her in the hope they can reunite.

== Cast ==
- Bette Davis as Susan Grieve
- Janis Paige as Peggy Markham
- James Davis as Slick Novak
- John Hoyt as Stacy Grant
- Florence Bates as Mrs. Castle
- Walter Baldwin as Mr. Castle
- Ransom Sherman as Mr. Roderick Moran Jr.

== Production ==
William Grant Sherry introduced his wife Bette Davis to the novel Winter Meeting and suggested it as a possibility for her next film. Davis enlisted her friend Catherine Turney to write a screen adaptation and stayed in close touch with her throughout the process, sending her memos about sequences that concerned her. "I am very rested and very ambitious to do something really outstanding - and I don't feel this, the way it is, answers the requirements," the actress noted at one point. She later recalled, "Winter Meeting was a great book . . . We should never have tried to make it. This is where censorship really hurt us. We were not allowed to be honest about the differences of opinion between a Catholic and a non-Catholic. It was, therefore, a dull and meaningless film." Davis spoke at length about the censorship problems with Winter Meeting in a later interview with Thomas M. Pryor of the New York Times, insisting the original story "would have made an engrossing film drama, but unfortunately much of the novel had to be bowdlerized to meet production code requirements."

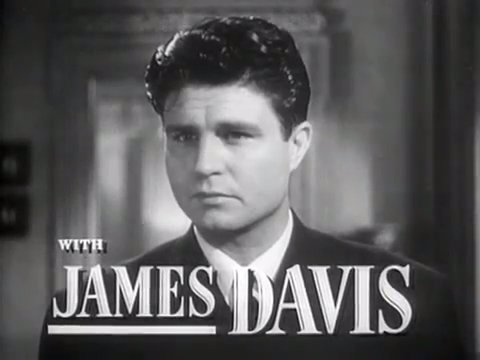
From the film's trailer

The casting of Slick Novak proved to be problematic. Burt Lancaster turned the role down because he did not like the script and did not find the character to be believable. Richard Widmark tested well, but studio executives were concerned his portrayal of a sadistic killer in the previous year's Kiss of Death would make it difficult for audiences to accept him in a sympathetic role. Thirteen additional actors were considered, and of them all Davis thought James Davis was best suited for the part. New York theatrical director Bretaigne Windust had been assigned the film because of his intimate knowledge of the Manhattan social scene, but Bette Davis felt that he ultimately was responsible for her leading man's lackluster performance. "Because of the overanalytical approach of Bretaigne Windust," she later observed, "Jim Davis never again during filming showed any signs of the character he portrayed in the test that made me want him for the part. No help I tried to give him could offset the effect of the detailed direction of Windust. He was lost and openly admitted it."

== Box office ==
The film cost $1,927,000 and took in $1,083,000 at the box office, $880,000 domestic and $203,000 foreign.

It was Davis' second film to lose money. Deception, made in 1946, was her first financial failure. Winter Meeting was her least financially successful Warners release. As a result, Jack L. Warner lost confidence in Davis as an asset to the studio, and Winter Meeting marked the beginning of her final days as a Warner star.

== Reception ==
In his review in The New York Times, Bosley Crowther opined

"Of all the frustrating experiences that Bette Davis has had in films...[this] is clearly the most bewildering, not only for her but for us... No doubt, the people at Warners thought they were doing Miss Davis a good turn by putting her in this situation which would tax the composure of a lady Job...But actually [their] generosity is Miss Davis' misfortune in this case and her manner of handling the situation is much better than that of the script...she actually catches at times some sense of a woman's deep disturbance at a most puzzling turn in an affair of love. And never, let's say to her credit, does she nibble the scenery as of yore. However, the explanation may be that she's so busy speaking lines — endless lines of completely tedious dialogue — that she has no time for anything else...Catherine Turney, who assembled this rhetoric...should be made to sit through Winter Meeting about twenty-five or thirty times — which is the number of times you are likely to feel you've sat through it when you've seen it once."

Time observed:

"The best thing that can be said about Winter Meeting is that its attempt to articulate Ethel Vance's obscure theme is a thoroughly honest failure and that Bette Davis's talents are great enough to be sometimes apparent even in the midst of such unrewarding mediocrity."

Variety noted:

"Miss Davis tries hard, but the script and the part and its treatment are against her, and the role assigned [James] Davis opposite her is too much for him."

TV Guide stated:

This one has more talk than a Senate filibuster and is only a tenth as interesting. Bette Davis is one of the great 'sufferers' of the silver screen and she does it again here, but the audience suffers just as much in this overblown drama."

== Bibliography ==
- Higham, Charles (1981). The Life of Bette Davis (1st ed.). New York City: Macmillan Publishing Company. pp. 211–212. ISBN 978-0025515000.
- Stine, Whitney; Davis, Bette (1974). Mother Goddam: The Story of the Career of Bette Davis (1st ed.). New York City: Hawthorn Books. pp. 210–214. ISBN 0-801551846.
- Staggs, Sam (2001). All About All About Eve. New York City: St. Martin's Press. p. 70. ISBN 978-0312273156.
