= Marjorie Carleton =

American playwright

Marjorie Carleton (1897 in Brockton, Massachusetts – 4 June 1964) was an American playwright and crime fiction novelist. Her best known work is Cry Wolf which was made into a 1947 film under the same title. She was nominated for the Edgar Award for Best Mystery Novel in 1958 by the Mystery Writers of America for her suspense novel The Night of the Good Children. Her plays included The Barretts, and The Bride Regrets.
