= The Unknown Terror =

1957 film by Charles Marquis Warren

- Theatrical release poster
- Directed by: Charles Marquis Warren
- Written by: Kenneth Higgins
- Produced by: Robert Stabler
- Starring: John Howard; Mala Powers; Paul Richards; May Wynn
- Cinematography: Joseph F. Biroc
- Edited by: Michael Luciano
- Music by: Raoul Kraushaar
- Color process: Black and white
- Production companies: Regal Films; Emirau Productions
- Distributed by: 20th Century Fox
- Release date: August 12, 1957
- Running time: 77 minutes
- Country: United States
- Language: English

The Unknown Terror is a 1957 American horror science fiction film directed by Charles Marquis Warren and starring John Howard, Mala Powers, Paul Richards and May Wynn. It was produced by Robert Stabler. The narrative follows a group of explorers who, while searching for a missing man, come across the "Cave of the Dead", filled with parasitic fungi and inhabited by foamy, fungus-covered monster men. The film was released theatrically in the US on August 12, 1957 on a double bill with Back from the Dead.

== Plot ==
The mysterious disappearance of Jim Wheatley while exploring the legendary "Cave of the Dead" brings his sister Gina Matthews and her husband Dan to what Dan calls the "shores of the Caribbean." But at a pre-expedition party, Gina is taken aback when Pete Morgan arrives uninvited. Pete, Gina and Dan had been a romantic triangle. Pete saved Dan's life on an earlier expedition, but was injured and now limps on his permanently damaged right leg; after the injury, Gina and Dan married. He convinces Dan to take him on the new expedition.

Sir Lancelot, the King of the Calypso, performs a song with cryptic lyrics that Dan believes refer to the Cave of the Dead: Down, down, down in the bottomless cave/Down, down, down beyond the last grave/If he's got the stuff of fame/If he's worthy of his name/He may get another chance but he's never more the same/He's got to suffer to be born again. But when Dan asks Raoul Koom, whose village is near the cave, to interpret the song, Raoul refuses, saying that it is better for both him and them if he keeps his mouth shut. Nevertheless, Dan, Gina, Pete and Raoul set off in search of the cave.

Upon their arrival in Raoul's village, where the residents deny that the cave exists, Raoul runs away. Dan, Gina and Pete go to the home of "Americano doctor" Ramsey. They find him boiling fruit in a large pot and putting it up in mason jars. Ramsey is married to a villager, Concha, whom he treats like a servant. When she drops a jar of fruit, he beats her. Pete stops him, but Gina notices that the fruit has fungus growing on it. Ramsey tells them that he uses the fruit on his research on fungi, bacteria and slime molds. Ramsey also says there is no Cave of the Dead. Dan, Pete and Gina, however, are determined to find it, and Dan offers to pay $200 to anyone in the village who will lead them to the cave.

The situation becomes tense when Concha takes Pete and Dan to a place where they can hear the voices of the dead crying from beneath the earth. While they are gone, a foamy fungus-covered man-monster chases Gina, who has stayed behind, into the jungle. She is saved when two passing men kill the creature.

Lino, who works for Ramsey, agrees to guide Dan and Pete to the cave entrance for the $200. While exploring the cave, Dan and Pete find several skeletons and Raoul's body. A storm floods the cave, trapping Dan. Pete escapes. After the storm abates, he and Gina return to the cave, again led by Lino. After they enter, Lino sets off a dynamite charge to trap them inside, but it also causes a rockslide which kills him.

Pete and Gina discover that the cave walls are thick with a fast-growing parasitic fungus, the same stuff that grows on Ramsey's canned fruit. They find Dan, his back broken. He warns them of the fungus-covered monster-men in the cave. The man-monsters attack, but Pete fights them off with his flaming torch. The fungus begins sliding in large blobs down the sides of the cave.

Pete finds a shaft that runs to Ramsey's house. Leaving Gina with Dan, he climbs up for help and learns that Ramsey himself has created the monster-making fungus. Ramsey refuses to help until Pete tells him that the fungus, which had so far been unable to live in fresh air, is now growing out of control. "We can't let it out!" exclaims Ramsey. "We can seal it in the cave! Otherwise it'll destroy the world!" Pete yanks Ramsey into the cave with him as Concha sets off explosives to collapse the shaft. The blast kills Ramsey, whose body is then consumed by his fungus. Dan dies from his injuries. Pete and Gina don the diving gear they've brought along and swim from the cave to the safety of a beautiful tropical beach.

== Cast ==
Starring:

- John Howard as Dan Matthews
- Mala Powers as Gina Matthews
- Paul Richards as Peter Morgan
- May Wynn as Concha Ramsey

With:

- Gerald Milton as Dr. Ramsey
- Duane Grey as Lino (as Duane Gray)
- Richard Gilden Raoul Koom
- Martin Garralaga as Old Native Villager
- Patrick O'Moore as Dr. Willoughby
- William Hamel as Mr. Trainer
- Charles H. Gray as Jim Wheatley (as Charles Gray)
- Charles Postal as The Butler

And:

- The King of the Calypso, Sir Lancelot

== Production ==
The project was originally known as Beyond Terror. Sir Lancelot signed to appear in the film to take advantage of the calypso craze.

It was the first of an eight-picture deal between Charles Marquiss Warren's Emirau Productions and 20th Century Fox.

The Unknown Terror was filmed during late March and early April 1957 at what Powers called "the old Producers Studio" in Hollywood. The film's working title was Beyond Terror, of which Powers said, "I think that might have been a better title." According to the American Film Institute (AFI), the name and composer of the song performed by Sir Lancelot during the movie is unknown. Music for the film is listed in the credits as being by Raoul Kraushaar, but without mention of individual pieces of music.

== Release ==
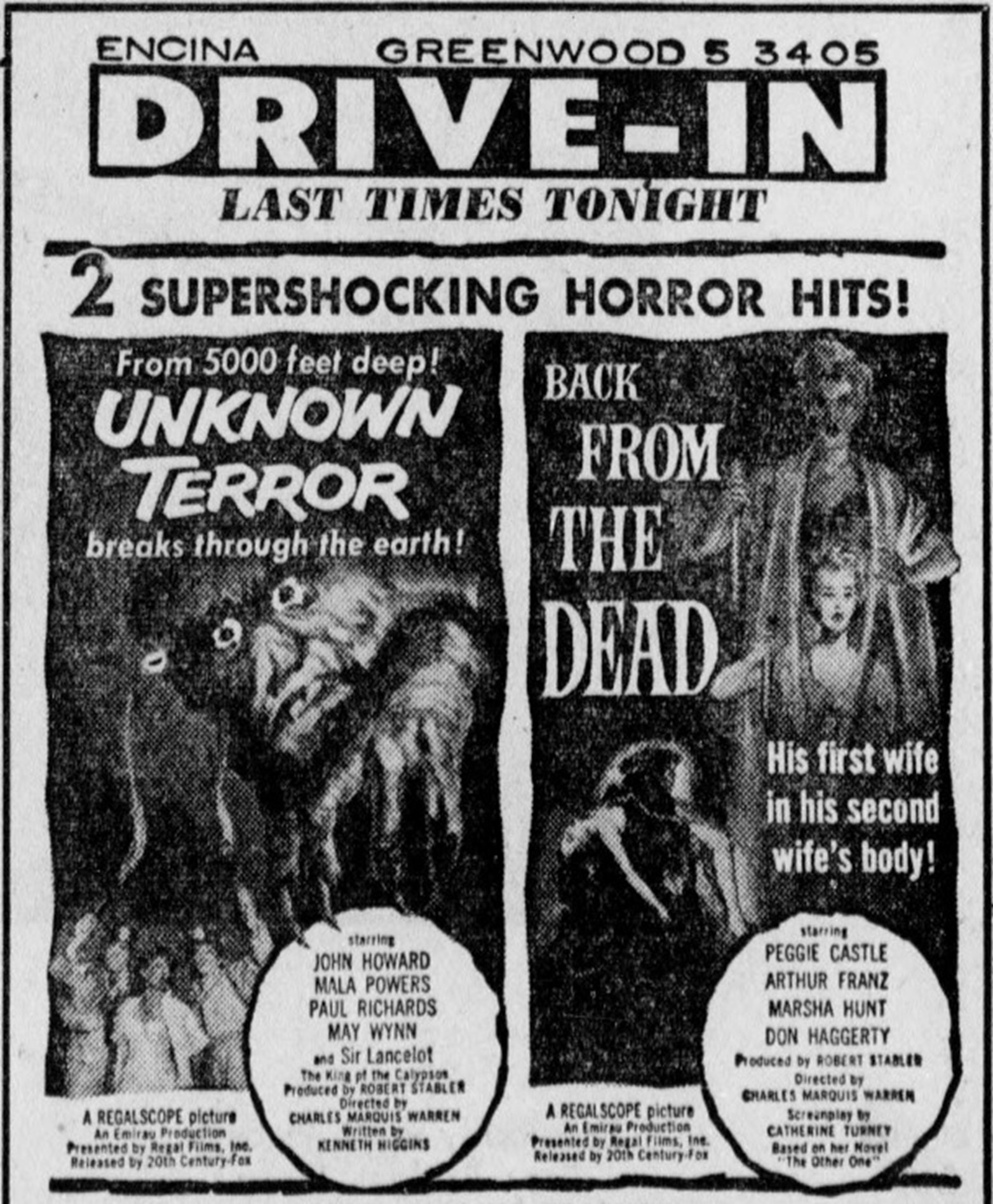
Drive-in advertisement from 1957 for The Unknown Terror and co-feature, Back from the Dead.

The Unknown Terror was the first film on a double-bill with Back from the Dead, both of which were made by Regal Films and were released in the US on August 12, 1957. The pressbook for the films refers to them as "2 Supermonstrous Superhuman Supershockers!"

When the film was released in the UK in October 1957, it was granted an A-certificate by the British Board of Film Censors. An "A-Cert" meant that the film was considered to be "more suitable for adults." The Unknown Terror opened in Sweden on December 1, 1957, and in Mexico and Greece at unspecified dates. Twentieth Century Fox distributed the film to theaters in the UK and the US.

The film went into television syndication through National Telefilm Associates in 1960. In Chicago, for example, it was shown repeatedly after 1964, when WBBM-TV instituted "Science Fiction Wednesdays" as part of the station's Early Show daily movie series, shown at 4:00 pm Central Time, which had been on the air since the 1950s. It was also shown regularly on Chicago's WGN-TV film series Creature Features in various time slots and on various days, usually starting between 10:30 pm and 1:25 am Central Time. The movie was not available for individual home viewing until 2004, when Teakwood Studios put on sale an "unauthorized" release in VHS and DVD formats.

== Critical reception ==
The Unknown Terror does not appear to have gotten particularly favorable reviews at the time of its release. BoxOffice in its regular feature "Review Digest" summarized the overall ratings given the film by six publications: The Hollywood Reporter and The Film Daily wrote that it was "good"; Parent's and Harrison's Reports called it "fair"; and Variety and BoxOffice both rated it as "poor." For the magazines that placed the film in the "poor" category, "Kove", writing in Variety after having previewed the film at the studio on July 30, 1957, said it was for "uncritical clientele" and that the direction is "at the elementary level. The Kenneth Higgins script is distinguished only by its moldy quality." BoxOffice offered readers only a brief synopsis of the plot, which noted that Gina and Pete "escape to bring to fruition the love they had always had for each other." The magazine suggested in its "Exploitips" that exhibitors create public interest by having "an aid" from a newspaper, TV or radio station watch the film with an audience and arranging "with a local doctor or psychology teacher to test the person afterward for pulse rate, effects, etc." BoxOffice also recommended decorating the theater lobby with "weird masks and Indian lore, with simulated fungus growing about."

The film's financial success varied by location. BoxOffice's "Boxoffice Barometer" measured gross receipts from exhibitors in 1957 in "20 key cities" using a scale on which 100 percent represented normal gross receipts. The magazine reported scores from seven of the 20 cities: Chicago, 200 percent of normal; Denver and New Haven, Connecticut, 100 percent; Detroit, 75 percent; Los Angeles, 55 percent; Pittsburgh, 45 percent; and San Francisco, 40 percent. The average score was calculated at 88 percent.

Film critics have disagreed about the film's precise setting, calling it variously Mexico, Central America, South America and the Caribbean. Dialogue within the film refers to the location only as the "shores of the Caribbean."

Much of the critical commentary about The Unknown Terror has focused on the special effects; i.e., the fungus and the fungus-covered man-monsters. Most critics, both at the time of the film's release and later, agree that the fungus looks much like soap suds. Per American film critic Bill Warren, The Monthly Film Bulletin said in its 1957 review that "the fungus looks like gargantuan quantities of good-quality detergent." Warren went on to write himself that "some fungi do resemble soap suds, but the reverse isn't true: soap suds do not convince as a fungal menace" and, as such, "credibility washes away in the foam." Bryan Senn, the American film critic, says in a similar vein that "it's difficult to make a bunch of advancing soapsuds look menacing" and that "the creatures themselves are never shown too clearly, which is just as well since they inspire more menace in spongy silhouette than in full bubbly view (upon which they look just like what they are – actors with bits of dirty cotton stuck to their faces)." British film critic Phil Hardy writes that "the monsters are unintentionally hilarious – they are simply actors entirely covered in soap suds." And Warren says he "wonders hopelessly why the filmmakers didn't consider how audiences might react when they saw huge quantities of suds pouring down cave walls. It's not likely they didn't care ... it's more likely they sadly misjudged the look of their menace, and the intelligence of most horror and science fiction audiences."

Two of the actors in The Unknown Terror have also commented on the special effects. Powers said in an interview that the fungus-covered monster-men's makeup "was just cotton, put on with a liquid adhesive or spirit gum." And while Howard called the monsters "just nonsense" in an interview, he also said that "in viewing the movie, I thought that it looked like soap bubbles coming down the cave walls. I didn't see how this would frighten anybody, but it sure frightened the hell out of my kids – they were scared to death!"

Other critics have dug more deeply into the film, peering through the suds to find more complex meanings. American academic film historian Rob Craig notes a religious theme within The Unknown Terror. He writes that the songs performed by Sir Lancelot "are well used as purveyors of taboo folk wisdom, with one line, 'He's got to suffer to be born again,' vividly foreshadowing the ensuing religious emphasis on the film." As an example, Craig writes that when he's asked about the Cave of the Dead's precise location, "Ramsey chuckles, 'I can show you how to find that – it's their purgatory ...' as he points his spoon towards the flames under his boiling pot. A more literal reference to the fiery flames of the Christian Hell cannot be imagined and the audience now knows that what the natives fear, and the white men seek, is access to death."

Laurence Raw, a British film scholar, makes special note of the role of Sir Lancelot in The Unknown Terror. To Raw, Sir Lancelot's importance is that he embodies "mainstream Euro representations of the African American experience – on the one hand he portrays the Caribbean as a holiday-maker's paradise, full of sunshine, sea and limitless pleasures; on the other hand it is also a place of great danger, wherein westerners are perpetually vulnerable to attack by unknown forces."

Aspects of Sir Lancelot's career in music and film were included in a Campbell Gallery exhibit at the University of Illinois, titled "Calypso Music in Postwar America: Photographs and Illustrations, 1945–1990." The exhibit featured "rare photographs and promotional graphics [which] are used to trace calypso in phonograph recordings, song publishing, nightclub acts, concerts, Broadway shows and Hollywood movies." The exhibit ran from March 25 to August 10, 2008.

== See also ==
- List of American films of 1957
