= A Stolen Life (film) =

1946 film by Curtis Bernhardt, Jack Gage

- Theatrical release poster
- Directed by: Curtis Bernhardt
- Screenplay by: Catherine Turney; Margaret Buell Wilder (adaptation)
- Based on: Uloupeny Zivot; 1935 novel by Karel Josef Benes
- Produced by: Bette Davis
- Starring: Bette Davis; Glenn Ford; Dane Clark; Walter Brennan; Charlie Ruggles; Bruce Bennett
- Cinematography: Ernest Haller; Sol Polito
- Edited by: Rudi Fehr
- Music by: Max Steiner
- Production company: B.D. Production
- Distributed by: Warner Bros. Pictures
- Release date: July 6, 1946
- Running time: 109 minutes
- Country: United States
- Language: English
- Budget: $2,217,000
- Box office: $4,785,000 $3 million (US rentals)

A Stolen Life is a 1946 American drama film starring Bette Davis, who also produced it. The film, based on the 1935 novel A Stolen Life by Karel Josef Benes, was directed by Curtis Bernhardt. Among the supporting cast are Glenn Ford, Dane Clark, Peggy Knudsen, Charlie Ruggles, and Bruce Bennett. It is a remake of the 1939 British film Stolen Life starring Elisabeth Bergner and Michael Redgrave.

It was nominated for Best Special Effects (William C. McGann; Special Audible Effects by Nathan Levinson) at the 19th Academy Awards, but lost to Blithe Spirit.

The second time Davis played twin sisters was in Dead Ringer (1964).

== Plot ==
Kate Bosworth is a sincere, demure artist who misses her boat to an island off New England, where she intends to meet her twin sister Patricia and her cousin Freddie. She persuades Bill Emerson to take on the two-hour journey in his boat. Later, their relationship grows while she paints a portrait of Eben Folger, the old lighthouse keeper, and Kate falls very much in love.

Her identical twin sister Pat, a flamboyant, man-hungry manipulator, fools Bill when she first meets him by pretending to be Kate. Pat then pursues him when he leaves the island for a trip to Boston, and when they return, they announce to Kate their intention to marry.

A heartbroken Kate focuses on her painting with a rude but very talented artist named Karnock, but rejects his sexual overtures. Bill eventually goes to Chile, allowing Kate to spend some time with her sister, whom she has not seen since the marriage. When the two go sailing, a sudden storm washes Pat overboard and she drowns, her sister inadvertently seizing her wedding ring while trying to save her. Kate passes out and is washed ashore in the boat. When she regains consciousness, she is mistaken for Pat.

Bill cuts his Chilean trip short due to "Kate's" death, so Kate decides to assume her dead sister's identity. To her surprise, she learns that Bill is angry at Pat for her many affairs and in no mood to continue their marriage. Cousin Freddie guesses the truth and insists that Kate must reveal to Bill her real identity. When she does, Bill realizes that Kate is the one he truly loves.

== Cast ==
- Bette Davis as Kate and Patricia Bosworth
- Glenn Ford as Bill Emerson
- Dane Clark as Karnock
- Walter Brennan as Eben Folger
- Charlie Ruggles as Freddie Linley
- Bruce Bennett as Jack R. Talbot
- Peggy Knudsen as Diedre
- Esther Dale as Mrs. Johnson
- Clara Blandick as Martha
- Joan Winfield as Lucy
- Jack Mower as George (uncredited)
- Leo White as Waiter (uncredited)

== Box office ==
According to Warner Bros. records, the film earned $3,222,000 domestically and $1,563,000 foreign.

== Reception ==
The Brooklyn Eagle criticized the plot's implausibilities while complimenting the cast: "Bette Davis is trying her hand...on a drama of two twin sisters, a film that Elisabeth Bergner used as a comeback vehicle in 1939. It is 'A Stolen Life,' a challenge to an actress but not a very rewarding drama. It is filled with emotional highspots and it scores an exciting melodramatic climax, but it fails utterly to be convincing....Individually, Miss Davis' characterizations are good....Glenn Ford is agreeable....Dane Clark draws a sharp but elaborate portrait....Charlie Ruggles adds an occasional and welcome dash of comedy....But 'A Stolen Life' needs a more serious operation than they can perform."
