= Back from the Dead (film) =

1957 film by Charles Marquis Warren

- Theatrical release poster
- Directed by: Charles Marquis Warren
- Screenplay by: Catherine Turney
- Based on: The Other One by Catherine Turney
- Produced by: Robert Stabler
- Starring: Peggie Castle; Arthur Franz; Marsha Hunt; Don Haggerty; Marianne Stewart; Otto Reichow
- Cinematography: Ernest Haller
- Edited by: Leslie Vidor
- Music by: Raoul Kraushaar
- Production company: 20th Century Fox
- Distributed by: 20th Century Fox
- Release date: August 12, 1957
- Running time: 79 minutes
- Country: United States
- Language: English

Back from the Dead is a 1957 American horror film produced by Robert Stabler and directed by Charles Marquis Warren for Regal Films. The film stars Peggie Castle, Arthur Franz, Marsha Hunt, and Don Haggerty. The narrative concerns a young woman who, under the influence of a devil cult, is possessed by the spirit of her husband's first wife, who had died six years earlier. The screenplay was written by Catherine Turney from her novel The Other One. The film was released theatrically on August 12, 1957, by 20th Century Fox on a double bill with The Unknown Terror (also 1957).

== Plot ==
A happy vacation along California's rocky coast for a pregnant Mandy Anthony, her husband Dick and her sister Kate Hazelton is ruined when Mandy has a seizure, loses consciousness and miscarries. Worse, when she awakens, she says that she is "Felicia" and calls Dick "Dicken." A stunned Dick tells an uncomprehending Kate that Felicia was his first wife and Dicken was her pet name for him - and that he's never told Mandy of his first marriage, the name Dicken, nor Felicia's death six years earlier!

Felicia demands to visit the Bradleys, an elderly couple whom Dick says that Mandy doesn't know. They're Felicia's parents. She convinces them that she is indeed Felicia, back from the dead. Mrs. Bradley is delighted; Mr. Bradley is horrified. Dick, upset by the reunion, tells Kate that Mrs. Bradley "was a strange, evil woman - Felicia, too" and that he was a fool to not face the truth. Meanwhile, Mr. Bradley says to Mrs. Bradley, "God will punish you for this." Mrs. Bradley contemptuously replies, "You believe in your god. I'll believe in mine."

Dick invites his friends John Mitchell and Molly Prentiss to the vacation house for cocktails. Afterwards, Felicia tries to gas Kate in her bedroom - Kate survives when Mandy's voice awakens her - then goes outside and kills their dog, Copper, who loved Mandy but hates Felicia.

The next day, Kate is at John's house when neighbor Nancy Cordell drops by. She casually tells Kate that she and the Bradleys are members of Maître Victor Renalt's devil cult, as was Felicia. Kate expresses an interest and Nancy arranges for Kate to meet Renault.

Kate tells Renault that Mrs. Bradley has brought Felicia back. This angers Renault because, he says, Mrs. Bradley went behind his back. After Kate and Nancy leave, Renault gazes lovingly at a photo and murmurs, "Now that you've returned, Felicia, I'll never let you go again." He fails to notice that a jealous Nancy has stayed behind and is watching him.

Mr. Bradley asks Kate to come see him. He tells her that he has left the devil cult and will help her bring Mandy back. But Mrs. Bradley threatens Kate, saying, "There are secret ways of causing pain - pain that will end in death." Kate is quite ill by the time she gets home, but John arrives and his feelings for Kate break Mrs. Bradley's curse.

John tells Kate his secret shame - that he feels responsible for Felicia's death. After a party, he found her hiding in his car. They stopped near the cliffs overlooking the sea and quarreled. Felicia said that she'd kill herself if John didn't submit to her advances. An angry John told her that if she wanted to die, they were in a good place for it. Felicia got out and started backing toward the edge of the cliff. John tried to stop her but she fell to her death on the rocks below.

The Bradley's housekeeper, Agnes, calls Dick in a panic. Dick, Felicia and Kate rush to the Bradley's house, where they find them both dead. Mrs. Bradley had killed Mr. Bradley but then died from a spell cast on her by Renault. Dick and Kate take Felicia home and lock her in her room. But she escapes after convincing Kate that she's really Mandy and then knocking Kate unconscious. Felicia goes to Renault and tells him that they have to act quickly or Mandy will return and reclaim the body they're sharing.

Nancy tells Dick, Kate and John that Renault will sacrifice Molly to keep Felicia alive. They all rush to Renault's to stop him. Dick and John wrestle a knife away from Renault but then Nancy, holding a pistol, yells at them to let Renault go. Nancy leads Renault outside and shoots him. Felicia has a seizure and the others take her home.

When she awakens, she is Mandy again and thinks that she has had an odd dream. Kate says that Mandy must never learn the truth about Felicia, while John asks rhetorically, "Will anyone ever?"

== Cast ==
- Peggie Castle as Mandy Hazelton Anthony
- Arthur Franz as Dick Anthony
- Marsha Hunt as Kate Hazelton
- Don Haggerty as John Mitchell
- Marianne Stewart as Nancy Cordell
- Otto Reichow as Maître Renault
- Helen Wallace as Ada Bradley
- James Bell as Mr. Bradley
- Evelyn Scott as Molly Prentiss
- Jeanne Bates as Agnes
- Ned Glass as The Doctor
- Jeane Wood as The Nurse

IMDb.com lists two uncredited performers: Jean Bradshaw as Redhead and Frances Turner as Baby Sitter.

== Production ==
The film was produced during April 1957 in Laguna Beach, California and cost about $125,000 to make.

It is based on the 1952 novel The Other One by Catherine Turney, who also wrote the screenplay. The working title for the movie was originally The Other One.

== Release ==
Back from the Dead was distributed to American theaters on August 12, 1957 by 20th Century Fox Film Corporation as the second feature on a double bill with the Regal Films science fiction movie The Unknown Terror. The pressbook for the films refers to them as "2 Supermonstrous Superhuman Shockers!" Back from the Dead went to theaters in Brazil and Greece at unspecified dates. National Television Associates handled it for syndication to television in the US, although the date it went into syndication is unknown. Contemporary posters show that the film was also released in the UK, where its exhibition was restricted to those age 16 and over by dint of the X-certificate given it by the British Board of Film Censors (BBFC).

The film has apparently popped up only rarely within other films or DVDs. A poster of it can be seen in the 1991 American comedy-horror film Popcorn. The US theatrical trailer was shown in Dawn to Dusk Drive-In Trash-0-Rama Show Vol. 9, a DVD released in 2002 by Something Weird Video

== Critical reception ==
Both contemporary and modern reviews are difficult to find for Back from the Dead. BoxOffice magazine's anonymous reviewer in 1957 offered little more than a brief plot description, pointing out that Felicia "belonged to a weird, blood-letting cult in which her mother is still active." The magazine's "Exploitips" for drumming up business suggested that exhibitors "have a woman dressed as a zombi (sic) wander about the streets near the theatre bearing a sign with the picture's title, such as: I am 'Back from the Dead.' Come and see me at (name of theatre)."

BoxOffice summarized the film's ratings from its usual sources in its weekly "Review Digest" feature. BoxOffice, Harrison's Reports, Variety and Film Daily all called the movie "fair." The Hollywood Reporter rated it as "good" while Parent's Magazine said it was "poor." BoxOffice also listed Back from the Dead in its weekly "Boxoffice Barometer," a numerical chart based on gross receipts from theaters in "20 key cities" on which a score of 100 percent was taken as normal. The magazine listed scores from seven cities. In Chicago, the film generated 200 percent of the usual gross receipts; in Denver and New Haven, Connecticut, 100 percent; and 75 percent in Detroit. Figures were lower in other cities, with Los Angeles reporting 55 percent; Pittsburgh 45 percent; and San Francisco 40 percent. The average score was 88 percent.

Marsha Hunt, who played Kate Hazelton, was interviewed by American film critic Tom Weaver about Back from the Dead. She said, "It was certainly not a fine film. I don't think that I could even say it's a good film. But it's such an interesting premise ... that you stay tuned." However, "it just doesn't have a quality that makes it memorable." Weaver writes that the movie was an attempt by Regal Films to "cash in" on the "intense public interest in reincarnation" which at the time centered on the "widely publicized story" of a Colorado woman "who claimed (after 'hypnotic regression') to be a nineteenth-century Irishwoman named Bridey Murphy." More than 170,000 copies of the book The Search for Bridey Murphy were sold and "for several months reincarnation became the subject of songs, nightclub acts, conversation and motion pictures."

Another American critic, Bryan Senn, sees both good and bad in the film. He writes that "the craggy coastline and brooding narration ... sets a melancholy tone and effectively creates a feeling of impending doom and inescapable disaster" and that Warren uses the rocky seaside setting "as a pointed symbol of unstoppable forces and malevolent intent." Unfortunately, he says, the film then "backs itself into a corner, thanks to its small-scale production and poorly-constructed script, which offers only a cheap satanic ritual, some halfhearted black magic mumbo-jumbo and a decidedly anticlimactic climax ...."

British critic Phil Hardy also takes issue with the script, calling it "cliché-ridden ... muddled, murky and a good deal less gripping" than the novel on which the film is based. But he singles out Hunt for credit, writing that as "the possessed woman's sister - in effect, the heroine - [she] gives a better performance than the circumstances warrant."
