= Of Human Bondage (1946 film) =

1946 film by Edmund Goulding

- Theatrical release poster
- Directed by: Edmund Goulding
- Screenplay by: Catherine Turney
- Based on: Of Human Bondage; 1915 novel by W. Somerset Maugham
- Produced by: Henry Blanke
- Starring: Paul Henreid; Eleanor Parker; Alexis Smith; Edmund Gwenn; Janis Paige
- Cinematography: J. Peverell Marley
- Edited by: Clarence Kolster
- Music by: Erich Wolfgang Korngold
- Production company: Warner Bros. Pictures
- Distributed by: Warner Bros. Pictures
- Release date: July 5, 1946
- Running time: 105 minutes
- Country: United States
- Language: English

Of Human Bondage is a 1946 American drama film directed by Edmund Goulding and starring Paul Henreid, Eleanor Parker and Alexis Smith. The second screen adaptation of W. Somerset Maugham's 1915 novel, this Warner Bros. Pictures sanitized version was written by Catherine Turney. The central characters are Philip Carey, a clubfooted medical student, and Mildred Rogers, a low-class waitress with whom he becomes obsessed.

The first film version of Somerset Maugham's classic novel was the 1934 film adaptation, starring Leslie Howard and Bette Davis, and the third was the 1964 film adaptation, starring Laurence Harvey and Kim Novak.

== Plot ==
Philip, an impoverished, clubfooted, failed artist, is attending medical school in London, using a trust set up for him by a wealthy uncle for tuition. When he initially meets Mildred, a waitress in whom his friend is interested, she pays scant attention to him and he finds her common and crass, but his wounded pride spurs him to return to the restaurant where she works, hoping to spark her interest. He invites her to accompany him to the theatre and, because she has nothing else to do, Mildred accepts. Philip spends what little money he has on her before she breaks a date with him and an ugly argument ensues. When he discovers she apparently has run off to marry one of her regular customers, Miller, he initially is happy to be free from his emotional bondage to her.

Philip resumes a relationship with Norah Nesbitt, an author he had met in France, but it soon becomes obvious to her that her love for him is returned only as friendship. A pregnant Mildred, abandoned by the married Miller, returns seeking Philip's help, and he takes her away to Brighton, willing to marry her and adopt the child. He introduces her to his handsome and personable friend Harry Griffiths, who entrances Mildred and steals her away from him.

Philip strikes up a friendship with Athelny, one of his patients, and quickly becomes a regular at the man's family Sunday dinners. He attracts the attention of Athelny's oldest daughter Sally, but when he sees the homeless Mildred in the street, he offers her and her baby a place to stay. The relationship is platonic, and Mildred becomes increasingly enraged by Philip's apparent lack of interest in her. When he spurns her physical advances, she chases him out of his home and then burns his money and trashes his apartment. Philip catches pneumonia and is nursed back to health by Griffiths, who eventually takes him to the hospital charity ward where Mildred is dying. With the burden of his obsession lifted by her death, Philip returns to Sally.

== Principal cast ==
- Paul Henried as Philip Carey
- Eleanor Parker as Mildred Rogers
- Edmund Gwenn as Athelny
- Janis Paige as Sally Athelny
- Patric Knowles as Harry Griffiths
- Isobel Elsom as Mrs. Athelny
- Alexis Smith as Norah Nesbitt
- Henry Stephenson as Dr. Tyrell
- Una O'Connor as Mrs. Foreman
- Matthew Boulton as Mr. Foreman
- Doris Lloyd as Landlady

== Production ==
The first screen adaptation, filmed in 1934, made a star of Bette Davis who, frustrated with the unsubstantial roles she was being assigned at Warner Bros., had campaigned long and hard for Jack L. Warner to release her to RKO to make the movie.

In 1944, hoping he could do for another of his contract players what the first film had done for Davis, Warner decided to give the part of Mildred to Eleanor Parker, at the time better known for sweet young lady roles. Director Goulding, unconvinced she could handle it, tested Parker twice before he decided she could pull it off. To prepare, Parker studied the Cockney dialect with character actress Doris Lloyd, who had a small supporting role in the film. She perfected it so well British extras thought she was one of them.

To explain the non-English accent of Philip Carey, portrayed by Paul Henreid, reference was made to his Austrian mother. Henreid was actually too old for the role and was fitted with a blond wig to disguise his age.

Henreid wrote in his memoirs that he felt the original script "was very well written" but that Goulding rewrote it throughout the shoot. He did not get along with Goulding, disagreeing as to how scenes should be played and taking too many long takes.

The film was completed in 1944 but, following a disastrous preview screening, was shelved for two years. After edits that lost Parker some of her best moments (a death scene showing her ravaged by illness was considered too grim for audiences and cut) and severely reduced Alexis Smith's performance from a lead to a supporting character, it was released to mostly poor reviews and largely ignored by the moviegoing public.

Henreid said after the preview that he suggested via his agent Lew Wasserman that producer Blanke redo the print and use pick-ups to help recut the film. He says that as a result "we ended up with a good film."

== Critical reception ==
In his review in The New York Times, Bosley Crowther described the remake as "a pale and pedestrian repeat ... so manufactured and dramatically inert that even those who did not see the original will likely find it disappointingly dull ... the role of Philip Carey is performed by Paul Henreid in a highly self-conscious and completely unconvincing style ... a girl named Eleanor Parker wiggles and whines so elaborately in the role of the licentious waitress that her manner seems almost in jest ... Edmund Goulding, the director, must share a part of the blame for the stuffed and mechanical performance of these two characters ... although the screen-writer, Catherine Turney, didn't help matters any here ... Of Human Bondage, in this version, is pretty much of a thorough-going bore."

Variety said the film "has been given excellent period mounting to fit early London background, is well-played and directed in individual sequences, but lacks overall smoothness ... Edmund Goulding's direction gets good work out of the cast generally, and helps interest, although most of major characters carry little sympathy."

TV Guide says, "Henreid and Parker do admirable jobs, though they certainly don't match Leslie Howard or Bette Davis ... Though by no means a great picture ... [it] is certainly an entertaining one."
