= So You Want to Be in Pictures =

1947 short film by Richard L. Bare

- Directed by: Richard L. Bare
- Written by: Richard L. Bare
- Produced by: Gordon Hollingshead
- Starring: George O'Hanlon; Art Gilmore; Jack Carson
- Cinematography: Wesley Anderson
- Edited by: Everett Dodd
- Music by: William Lava
- Production company: Richard L. Bare Productions
- Distributed by: Warner Bros.
- Release date: June 7, 1947
- Running time: 11 minutes
- Country: United States
- Language: English

So You Want to Be in Pictures is a 1947 one-reel short film in the Joe McDoakes series, starring George O'Hanlon. It was written and directed by Richard L. Bare.

== Cast ==
=== Main ===
- George O'Hanlon as Joe McDoakes
- Art Gilmore as narrator

=== Cameo appearance/uncredited ===
- Jack Carson as man giving directions
- George Chandler as Sammy
- Clyde Cook as actor in army scene
- Bess Flowers as woman with sunglasses
- Jane Harker as Alice McDoakes
- Robert Hutton as himself
- Wayne Morris as himself
- Janis Paige as herself
- Ronald Reagan as himself
- Ralph Sanford as Anthony Anguish
- Alexis Smith as herself
- Martha Vickers as herself
