= The Fountainhead (film) =

1949 film directed by King Vidor

- Theatrical release poster
- Directed by: King Vidor
- Screenplay by: Ayn Rand
- Based on: The Fountainhead; 1943 novel by Ayn Rand
- Produced by: Henry Blanke
- Starring: Gary Cooper; Patricia Neal; Raymond Massey; Kent Smith; Robert Douglas
- Cinematography: Robert Burks
- Edited by: David Weisbart
- Music by: Max Steiner
- Distributed by: Warner Bros. Pictures
- Release date: July 2, 1949
- Running time: 112 minutes
- Country: United States
- Language: English
- Budget: $2.375 million
- Box office: $3 million

The Fountainhead is a 1949 American black-and-white drama film produced by Henry Blanke, directed by King Vidor, and starring Gary Cooper, Patricia Neal, Raymond Massey, Robert Douglas and Kent Smith. The film is based on the bestselling 1943 novel of the same name by Ayn Rand, who also wrote the adaptation. Although Rand's screenplay was used with minimal alterations, she later criticized the editing, production design and acting.

The story follows the life of Howard Roark, an individualistic architect who chooses to struggle in obscurity rather than compromise his artistic and personal vision. Roark fights to design modern architecture despite resistance from the traditionally minded architectural establishment. Roark's complex relationships with the individuals who assist or hinder his progress allow the film to be both a romantic drama and a philosophical work. Roark represents Rand's embodiment of the human spirit, and his struggle represents the struggle between individualism and collectivism.

The film opened to negative reviews and was panned by critics but has since been reappraised.

== Plot ==
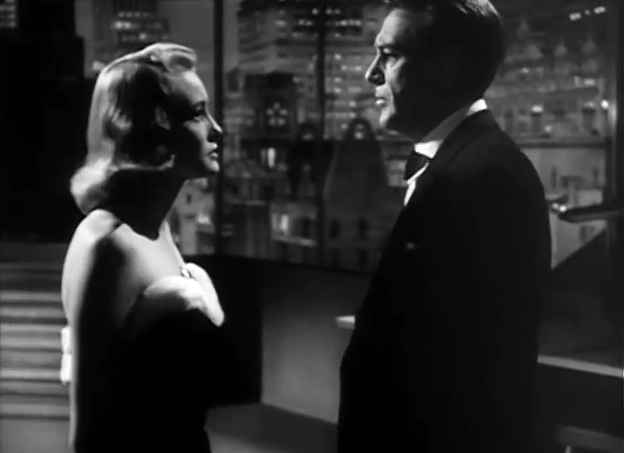
Patricia Neal and Gary Cooper in The Fountainhead

Howard Roark is an individualistic architect who follows his own artistic path in the face of public conformity. Ellsworth Toohey, the architecture critic for The Banner newspaper, opposes Roark's individualism and volunteers to lead a print crusade against him. Wealthy and influential publishing magnate Gail Wynand pays little attention, approving the idea and giving Toohey a free hand. Dominique Francon, a glamorous socialite who writes a Banner column, admires Roark's designs, and opposes the paper's campaign against him. She is engaged to an architect, the unimaginative Peter Keating (Kent Smith). She never has met or seen Roark, but she believes that he is doomed in a world that abhors individualism. Wynand falls in love with Francon and exposes Keating as an opportunist.

Roark is unable to find a client willing to build according to his vision. He walks away from opportunities that involve any compromise of his standards. Broke, he takes a job as a day laborer in a quarry that belongs to Francon's father and is near the Francon summer home. The vacationing Francon visits the quarry on a whim and spots Roark, and they share a mutual attraction. Francon contrives to have Roark repair some white marble in her bedroom. Roark mocks her pretense, and after the first visit, he sends another worker to complete the repair. Francon is enraged and returns to the quarry on horseback. She finds Roark walking from the site. He again mocks her, and she strikes him across the face with her horsewhip. He later appears in her open bedroom, forcefully embracing and kissing her passionately. In his room, Roark finds a letter offering him a new building project. He immediately packs up and leaves. Francon later goes to the quarry and learns that Roark has quit. She does not know that he is Howard Roark, the brilliant architect whom she had once championed in print.

Wynand offers to marry Francon, though she is not in love with him. Francon demurs and soon learns Roark's true identity when she is introduced to him at a party opening the Enright House, a new building that Roark has designed. Francon goes to Roark's apartment and offers to marry him if he gives up architecture, saving himself from public rejection. Roark rejects her fears and says that they will face many years apart until she alters her thinking. Francon finds Wynand and accepts his marriage proposal. Wynand agrees and commissions Roark to build him a lavish but secluded country home. Wynand and Roark become friends, which drives Francon to jealousy.

Keating, employed to create an enormous housing project, requests Roark's help. Roark agrees, demanding that Keating must build it exactly as designed in exchange for permitting Keating to take all of the credit. With prodding from the envious Toohey, the firm backing the project alters the Roark design presented by Keating into a gingerbread monstrosity. Roark, with Francon's help, rigs explosives to destroy the buildings and is arrested at the site. Toohey pressures Keating into privately confessing that Roark had designed the project. Roark goes on trial and is painted as a public enemy by every newspaper apart from The Banner, in which Wynand now publicly campaigns on Roark's behalf. However, Toohey has permeated The Banner with men loyal to him. He has them quit and uses his clout to keep others out. He leads a campaign against The Banner's new policy that all but kills the newspaper. Faced with losing, Wynand saves The Banner by bringing back Toohey's gang, joining the rest in publicly condemning Roark.

Calling no witnesses, Roark addresses the court on his own behalf. He makes a long speech defending his right to offer his own work on his own terms. He is found innocent of the charges against him. A guilt-stricken Wynand summons the architect and coldly presents him with a contract to design the Wynand Building, destined to become the greatest structure of all time, with complete freedom to build it however Roark sees fit. As soon as Roark leaves, Wynand pulls out a pistol and kills himself.

Months later, Francon enters the construction site of the Wynand Building and identifies herself as Mrs. Roark. She rises in the open construction elevator, looking upward toward the figure of her husband. Roark stands, his arms akimbo, near the edge of the tall skyscraper as the crosswinds buffet him.

== Cast ==
- Gary Cooper as Howard Roark
- Patricia Neal as Dominique Francon
- Raymond Massey as Gail Wynand
- Kent Smith as Peter Keating
- Robert Douglas as Ellsworth M. Toohey
- Henry Hull as Henry Cameron
- Ray Collins as Roger Enright
- Moroni Olsen as Chairman
- Jerome Cowan as Alvah Scarret
- Griff Barnett as Judge (uncredited)
- Creighton Hale as Court Clerk (uncredited)
- Russell Hicks as Board Member (uncredited)
- Jack Mower as Foreman (uncredited)
- Paul Newlan as Policeman (uncredited)
- Charles Trowbridge as Director (uncredited)
- Leo White as Pedestrian (uncredited)

== Production ==
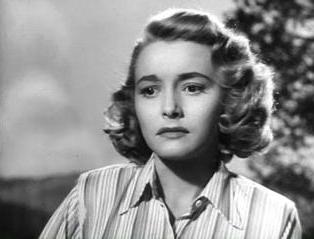
Patricia Neal played Dominique Francon.

Ayn Rand's novel The Fountainhead was published in May 1943. Barbara Stanwyck read it and wanted to play the novel's heroine, Dominique Francon, in a movie adaptation. She asked Jack L. Warner to buy the rights to the book for her. Warner Bros. Pictures purchased the film rights in October 1943 and asked Rand to write the screenplay. Rand agreed, on the condition that not a single word of her dialogue be changed. The Fountainhead went into production with Mervyn LeRoy hired to direct, but the production was delayed. LeRoy said that the delay was the result of the influence of the War Production Board, spurred by Rand's anti-Communist politics.

Three years later, production commenced under the direction of King Vidor, although there were disputes among Rand, Vidor, and Warner Bros. throughout the production. Vidor wanted Humphrey Bogart to play Howard Roark, and Rand wanted Gary Cooper to play the part. Stanwyck continued to push for the role of Dominique, appealing personally to Rand and to producer Henry Blanke, but Vidor thought she was too old. Press reports in early 1948 suggested Lauren Bacall would be cast as Dominique, but in June, Vidor hired Patricia Neal for the role. Cooper criticized Neal's audition as badly acted, but she was cast against his judgment; during the production, Cooper and Neal began an affair. Rand called Stanwyck to tell her about the decision. Stanwyck was upset, both about losing the role and that no one from the studio spoke to her about it. This led to her leaving Warner Bros.

=== Writing ===
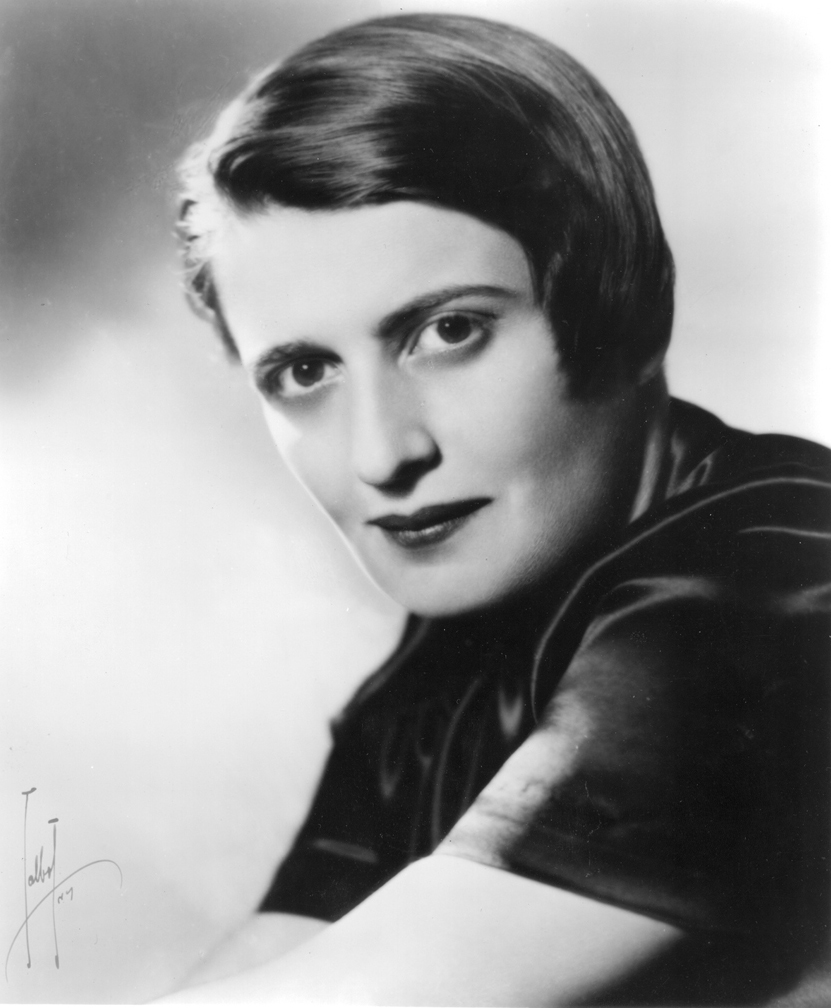
Ayn Rand wrote the screenplay based on her own novel.

Rand completed her screenplay in June 1944. The setting of The Fountainhead is a collective society in which individuals and new ideas of architecture are not accepted, and all buildings must be constructed "... like Greek temples, Gothic cathedrals and mongrels of every ancient style they could borrow", in the deathbed words of Roark's patron Henry Cameron. Rand's screenplay criticized the Hollywood film industry and its self-imposed mandate to "give the public what it wants". Roark, in his architecture, refuses to give in to this demand "by the public". He refuses to work in any way that compromises his integrity and in which he would succumb to "popular taste". In a similar vein, Rand wrote a new scene for the film in which Roark is rejected as architect for the Civic Opera Company of New York, an allusion to Edgar Kaufmann, Jr., Frank Lloyd Wright, and the Civic Light Opera Company of Pittsburgh.

While communism is not explicitly named, the film is interpreted as a criticism of the communist ideology and the lack of individual identity in a collective life under a communist society. However, the novel's criticisms were aimed at Franklin D. Roosevelt's New Deal, which is reflected in Rand's endorsement of modernism in architecture in both the book and the film. In adapting her novel, Rand used the melodrama genre to dramatize the novel's sexuality and the aesthetics of modernistic architecture.

Patricia Neal remembered that Rand often visited the set to "protect her screenplay". During filming, Vidor decided that Roark's speech at the end of the film was too long, and decided to omit segments that he did not feel relevant to the plot. After learning of Vidor's decision, Rand appealed to Jack L. Warner to honor her contract, and Warner persuaded Vidor to shoot the scene as she had written it.

Rand later wrote a note thanking Warner and the studio for allowing the preservation of the novel's "... theme and spirit, without being asked to make bad taste concessions, such as a lesser studio would have demanded".

However, Rand altered the film's plot slightly to be approved by the Production Code Administration. In the novel, Wynand divorces Dominique, but because the Motion Picture Production Code prohibited divorces, Rand opted to have Wynand commit suicide instead.

=== Production design ===
Rand's screenplay instructed, "It is the style of Frank Lloyd Wright -- and only of Frank Lloyd Wright -- that must be taken as a model for Roark's buildings. This is extremely important to us, since we must make the audience admire Roark's buildings." According to Warner Bros., once it was known that the film had gone into production, the studio received letters from architects suggesting designs; Wright turned down an offer to work on the film.

The architectural style that Roark advocates, realized in the production designs of Edward Carrere, is closer to the corporate International Style of the East Coast in the late 1940s than it is to Wright's architecture of the Midwest from the 1920s era when Rand's book was written. Therefore, the style is rooted in German, rather than American, modernism. During filming, Rand told Gerald Loeb that she disliked the style, which she felt had resulted from Carrere's lack of experience as a practicing architect. She described his designs as copied from pictures of "horrible modernistic buildings" and judged them as "embarrassingly bad". The film's closing image, depicting Roark standing atop his "tallest structure in the world", arguably evokes futurism.

=== Music score ===
The film's score was composed by Max Steiner, with orchestrations by Murray Cutter. Chris Matthew Sciabarra described Steiner as a "veritable film score architect...perhaps, the 'fountainhead' of film music" and says that Steiner's cues "immediately call to mind the story of Howard Roark".

Philosophy professor Glenn Alexander Magee has offered that the score suggested "a strong affinity for The Fountainhead...[it] perfectly conveys the feel of a Rand novel," and that Steiner's music accents the story's themes of redemption and renewal, providing insight into Roark's opposition, Francon's sense of life, and Wynand's flaw.

Excerpts from Steiner's score were included in RCA Victor's tribute to the composer, an album featuring the National Philharmonic Orchestra conducted by Charles Gerhardt that was released on LP in 1973 and reissued on CD.

== Release ==
Neal appeared on the television series Hollywood Calling with Milton Berle to discuss their upcoming films, which included The Fountainhead and Berle's Always Leave Them Laughing.

For the film's Warner Hollywood Theatre premiere, Warner Bros. erected two banks of bleachers on Hollywood Boulevard to accommodate the expected mob of fans. Neal attended the premiere with Kirk Douglas as her date, and the two signed autographs for fans. The Los Angeles Times wrote that the audience "strongly responded to the unusual elements in the production". After the film, Neal noticed that many people were avoiding her and turning their faces away, except for Virginia Mayo, who approached Neal and exclaimed "My, weren't you bad!" Cooper felt that he had not delivered the final speech as he should have. Around this time, Cooper and Neal let it be publicly known that they were having an affair, and the public knowledge of their relationship may have somewhat negatively affected the film's box office.

=== Rand's response ===
Sales of Rand's novel increased following release. She wrote, "The picture is more faithful to the novel than any other adaptation of a novel that Hollywood has ever produced" and "It was a real triumph." Rand conceded to friend DeWitt Emery that "I can see your point in feeling that Gary Cooper's performance should have been stronger", but concluded, "I would rather see the part underplayed than overdone by some phony-looking ham." In later years, she would state that she "... disliked the movie from beginning to end" and complained about the film's editing, acting and other elements. As a result of the film, Rand said that she would not sell any more of her novels without the right to pick the director and screenwriter and to edit the film.

=== Box οffice ===
According to Warner Bros. financial records, the film earned $2,179,000 domestically and $807,000 in foreign markets (thus $2,986,000 worldwide), against a cost of $2,375,000.

== Reception ==
=== Initial reception ===
The Fountainhead was panned by critics upon its initial release. The Hollywood Reporter wrote: "Its characters are downright weird and there is no feeling of self-identification." The Los Angeles Times wrote that the film would not "catch the interest of what is known as the average movie audience -- whoever they may be nowadays". The communist newspaper Daily Worker deemed The Fountainhead to be "an openly fascist movie". Variety called the film "cold, unemotional, loquacious [and] completely devoted to hammering home the theme that man's personal integrity stands above all law". John McCarten of The New Yorker deemed the film to be "the most asinine and inept movie that has come out of Hollywood in years". Cue described it as "shoddy, bombastic nonsense". Bosley Crowther, in his review for The New York Times, called the film "wordy, involved and pretentious" and characterized Vidor's work as a "vast succession of turgid scenes".

=== Retrospective reception ===
While The Fountainhead opened to negative reviews upon initial release, the film has since been reappraised and received significantly more positive reception in the early years of the 21st century.

On review aggregator Rotten Tomatoes, the film has an approval rating of 83% based on 12 reviews, with an average rating of 7/10. Film critic Emanuel Levy described it as a "highly enjoyable, juicy Freudian melodrama", praising Vidor's technical virtuosity and imagery. Dave Kehr wrote "King Vidor turned Ayn Rand's preposterous 'philosophical' novel into one of his finest and most personal films, mainly by pushing the phallic imagery so hard that it surpasses Rand's rightist diatribes."

Mike McCahill ranked The Fountainhead on The Telegraph’s list of the "50 Most Underrated Films of All Time".

Marxist philosopher Slavoj Žižek considers it one of his five favorite movies: "ultracapitalist propaganda, but it's so ridiculous that I cannot but love it".

== Home media ==
In the United States, the film was released on DVD by Warner Bros. Home Entertainment on November 7, 2006. The title was released as both a standalone DVD, as well as part of a 5-film Gary Cooper DVD box-set.

== Legacy ==
Architect David Rockwell, who saw the film when he visited New York City in 1964, has said that the film influenced his interest in architecture and design and that at his university, many architecture students named their dogs Roark as a tribute to the protagonist of the novel and film.

Director Steven Berkoff described the film as a life-changing experience and claimed that the film "knocked [him] sideways".

Illustrator Nick Gaetano first encountered Ayn Rand's work via the film, which he admired for Gary Cooper's performance. This led him to accept a commission for the 25th anniversary covers of several Ayn Rand novels. His Art Deco-style illustrations would become closely associated Rand's works.

Various filmmakers have expressed interest in new adaptations of The Fountainhead, although none of these potential films has begun production. In the 1970s, writer-director Michael Cimino wanted to film his own script for United Artists. In 1992, producer James Hill optioned the rights and selected Phil Joanou to direct. In the 2000s, Oliver Stone was interested in directing a new adaptation; Brad Pitt was reportedly under consideration to play Roark. In a March 2016 interview, director Zack Snyder also expressed interest in a new film adaptation. In 2021, Snyder revealed that he had put the project on hold.

In February 2020, the film was shown at the 70th Berlin International Film Festival as part of a retrospective dedicated to King Vidor's career.
