= Cry Wolf (1947 film) =

1947 film by Peter Godfrey

- Theatrical release poster
- Directed by: Peter Godfrey
- Screenplay by: Catherine Turney
- Based on: Cry Wolf; 1945 novel by Marjorie Carleton
- Produced by: Henry Blanke
- Starring: Errol Flynn; Barbara Stanwyck; Geraldine Brooks
- Cinematography: Carl E. Guthrie
- Edited by: Folmar Blangsted
- Music by: Franz Waxman
- Production company: Warner Bros. Pictures
- Distributed by: Warner Bros. Pictures
- Release date: 18 July 1947
- Running time: 83 minutes
- Country: United States
- Language: English
- Budget: $1,461,000
- Box office: $2 million (US rentals) or $2,690,000

Cry Wolf is a 1947 American mystery film noir directed by Peter Godfrey and starring Errol Flynn, Barbara Stanwyck and Geraldine Brooks. It was produced and distributed by Warner Bros. Pictures. It is based on the 1945 novel of the same name by Marjorie Carleton.

== Plot ==
Hearing that her husband is dead, Sandra Marshall arrives at his prominent family's remote estate to claim her inheritance. She receives a cold reception, especially from her husband's uncle, research scientist Mark Caldwell, who had not known about her or the marriage and accuses her of scheming. He allows her to stay in the mansion while the legal details are settled, and as the two become better acquainted, they develop a less contentious relationship.

Caldwell's teenage niece Julie welcomes Sandra but claims that her uncle is holding her prisoner on the estate, that strange things are occurring in an area of the mansion that she is forbidden to enter and that the older family members and their servants may not be telling the truth about the recent death. Although Caldwell insists that Julie simply has an overactive imagination, Sandra wonders what to believe and whom to trust. Increasingly convinced that something is amiss at the mansion, she becomes willing to take risks to uncover what it is.

== Cast ==
- Errol Flynn as Mark Caldwell
- Barbara Stanwyck as Sandra Marshall
- Geraldine Brooks as Julie Demarest
- Richard Basehart as James Caldwell Demarest
- Jerome Cowan as Senator Charles Caldwell
- John Ridgely as Jackson Laidell
- Patricia Barry as Angela
- Rory Mallinson as Becket
- Helene Thimig as Marta
- Paul Stanton as Davenport
- Barry Bernard as Roberts
- Lisa Golm as Mrs. Laidell
- Jack Mower as Watkins
- Creighton Hale as Doctor Reynolds
- Paul Panzer as Gatekeeper

== Production ==
=== Original novel ===
The novel was published in January 1945. The New York Times wrote: "[T]he plot has pace; the mansion is traditionally eerie, the heroine is charming. Situations and dialogue, however, are often clumsily handled." The Chicago Tribune called the book "a spicy piece".

=== Development ===
In April 1945, Warner Bros. Pictures bought the film rights as a vehicle for Barbara Stanwyck. Catherine Turney was assigned to write the script and Dennis Morgan announced as the male lead. Turney says Stanwyck read the book "and thought it was a good part for her."

In March 1946, Errol Flynn was announced as the male lead and Peter Godfrey as director. Turney says Flynn realised he was playing support to Stanwyck but after reading the script felt it was "kind of an interesting character" and was persuaded to make the film.

The film was produced by Flynn's Thomson Productions company. According to Catherine Turney, "At that time, the studio was making deals with some of the big stars so they wouldn't have to give them raises in salary. They would make them producers in name only, and it allowed them to get capital gains, something taken off their income tax." She says this was the case with Flynn who "never functioned" as a producer on Cry Wolf "in any way. He couldn't have cared less."

Geraldine Brooks and Richard Basehart were both New York stage actors who had recently accepted contracts with Warner Bros.

=== Shooting ===
Filming started in May 1946 and concluded in August. Turney said she found Flynn "very easy to work with, very charming. And he was always very agreeable with me on the set. And it turned out to be a pretty good picture."

== Reception ==
The film was not released until July 1947.

=== Critical ===
In a contemporary review for The New York Times, critic Bosley Crowther wrote: "[A]ll of the dark and ominous doings in a good three-quarters of this film—all of the fearful things encountered by a presumed young widow in a big dark house, ruled over by an icy young scientist who maintains a forbidden laboratory in one wing—are just so much clear and calculated dust in the audience's eyes. The final explanation of the mystery is ridiculous and banal. ... As it draws on toward its payoff, the disappointment looms. And when it is plain that the whole thing is a mockery—well, you know how those shepherds must have felt when that naughty little joker brought them running with his baseless cry of 'Wolf!'"

The Wall Street Journal wrote that the film was "often as dull as it is frightening because its melodramatic story is full of cliches... without tommy gun or sword, Mr. Flynn seems unhappily wooden." The Christian Science Monitor wrote that it "grips the attention and holds it right through...the result is something well above average."

The Los Angeles Times called the film "murky" and "fairly opaque" although it felt that audiences "are likely to be impressed by the performance of Flynn."

=== Box office ===
The film was moderately successful at the box office. Variety estimated its rentals in the U.S. and Canada at $2 million.

According to Warner Bros. records, the film earned $1,842,000 domestically and $848,000 foreign.
