= My Reputation =

1946 film

- Directed by: Curtis Bernhardt
- Screenplay by: Catherine Turney
- Based on: Instruct My Sorrows; 1942 novel by Clare Jaynes
- Produced by: Henry Blanke; Jack L. Warner (executive producer)
- Starring: Barbara Stanwyck; George Brent; Eve Arden; Lucile Watson; Scotty Beckett; Bobby Cooper
- Cinematography: James Wong Howe
- Edited by: David Weisbart
- Music by: Max Steiner
- Distributed by: Warner Bros. Pictures
- Release date: January 25, 1946
- Running time: 94 minutes
- Country: United States
- Language: English
- Budget: $1,106,000
- Box office: $3 million (US rentals) or $4,001,000

My Reputation is a 1946 American romantic drama film directed by Curtis Bernhardt. Barbara Stanwyck portrays an upper-class widow whose romance with an army officer causes trouble for her gossiping friends, domineering mother and young sons. Catherine Turney wrote the script, an adaptation of Clare Jaynes' 1942 novel Instruct My Sorrows. Stanwyck's costumes were designed by Edith Head.

== Plot ==
When her beloved husband dies after a long illness, Jessica "Jess" Drummond is comforted by the executor of her husband's estate, lawyer Frank Everett, a longtime family friend who later shows an interest in dating her. Jess has two boys, 14-year-old Keith and 12-year-old Kim. She tries to reconnect with her friends but finds that they remind her too much of her husband. George Van Orman, an old friend, forces himself on her and she rejects his advances. She runs to her friend Ginna Abbott and accompanies Ginna and her husband Cary on a vacation to Lake Tahoe.

When Jess finds herself lost with a broken ski, she meets Major Scott Landis, who helps her back to the Abbotts' lodge. Jess and Scott become acquainted but she spurns his romantic advances and tells him to leave. Back home in Lake Forest, Jess learns that Scott has been seen at a club. Jess goes to the club to find Scott and discovers that he is stationed in Chicago. However, he refrains from telling her that he is waiting for military orders to be deployed overseas.

When a friend of Jess's mother sees Jess enter Scott's apartment, gossip spreads among Jess's friends, including George's wife Riette and their children. Jess's mother Mary confronts Scott on Christmas Eve. Jess's relationship with Scott is platonic, though Jess has begun to return his affections, initially out of spite against the rumor mill. She later confronts the gossipers at a New Year's Eve party, where Riette expresses her disapproval of Jess's behavior. Jess denies any wrongdoing and resents Riette's intrusion.

After Jess tells Scott that she loves him, he tells her that he must report to New York the next day for his next overseas assignment. Jess wants to accompany him to New York so that may spend their remaining time together. They agree to meet at the train platform. Kim and Keith ask her if she is really going to New York, and she confirms that she is.

In the early morning, Jess discovers that the boys have fled to Mary's house. They think that her planned trip to New York with Scott means that the gossip, what they had heard at the New Year's Eve party, is true. Jess assures them that she loved their father and continues to do so, but that she can also love another. While they do not fully understand their mother's explanation, Kim and Keith choose to return home with Jess. Mary congratulates Jess for her efforts to bring them back to her life.

Jess hurries to the train platform to meet Scott. She informs him that she cannot accompany him as her sons are too young to understand the situation. Scott tells her that he has changed and wants to be with her, and asks her to wait for his return. Jess promises to do so, and Scott departs on the train.

== Cast ==
- Barbara Stanwyck as Jessica Drummond
- George Brent as Maj. Scott Landis
- Warner Anderson as Frank Everett
- Lucile Watson as Mrs. Mary Kimball
- John Ridgely as Cary Abbott
- Eve Arden as Ginna Abbott
- Jerome Cowan as George Van Orman
- Esther Dale as Anna
- Scotty Beckett as Kim Drummond
- Bobby Cooper as Keith Drummond
- Leona Maricle as Riette Van Orman
- Mary Servoss as Mary
- Cecil Cunningham as Mrs. Stella Thompson
- Janis Wilson as Penny Boardman
- Ann E. Todd as Gretchen Van Orman

== Reception ==
The New York Times' Bosley Crowther described the film as "much ado about nothing—or practically nothing, we'd say. For this earnest dramatic disquisition on the great value of a good name, after making elaborate clawing gestures at the hearts of the customers for more than an hour, arrives at an easy conclusion which makes the whole preceding turmoil seem absurd…Dismissing completely the aspects of egocentrism in this yarn…the mere demonstration of behavior and social conventions herein is so thoroughly stilted and stuffy that the whole thing lacks common sense. As the beautiful widow-lady, Barbara Stanwyck tries hard to act real, but the script seems to make her uncomfortable, except in a tight sweater in one scene. George Brent plays the role of the major with a strong list to juvenility, especially in those passages wherein he is supposed to make wolfish love. Mr. Brent, for your information, is about as urbane as a high-school sophomore."

According to Warner Bros. records, the film earned $2,775,000 in the U.S. and $1,226,000 in other markets.

== Release ==
Though the film was produced in 1944 on the heels of Stanwyck's great success, Double Indemnity, it was not released in the U.S. until 1946. It was first distributed for showing to members of the armed forces.
