= Wilhelm Blanke =

German painter (1873–1936)

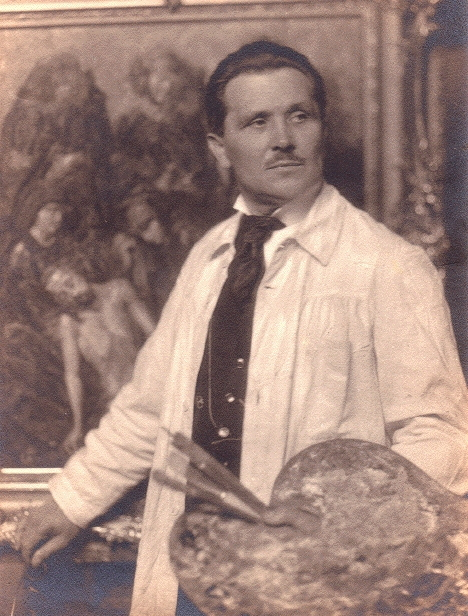
- Blanke in 1923
- Born: Wilhelm Blanke; 11 March 1873; Kargowa, Province of Posen, German Empire
- Died: 16 April 1936 (aged 63)
- Known for: Painting; lithography

Wilhelm Blanke (11 March 1873 – 16 April 1936) was a German painter and lithographer.

Born to Johanna Karoline (née Neumann) and Ernst Johann Blanke in Kargowa, he was trained as a decorative painter by his eldest brother. He later moved to Berlin to work on his profession. From 1895 to 1930, Blanke lived and worked in Steglitz. Blanke often participated in art exhibitions.

In the 1920s, his art reflected an Art Deco taste. After an art exhibition in 1931, art critic Franz Servaes called Blanke "one of the greatest masters of Berlin painting," praising how "every brushstroke 'sits' with him," and complimenting how he juxtaposes colors "in the most daring way." Indeed, Blanke was noted for his use of color in his work.

He had a son, Henry, born in 1901.

== Gallery ==
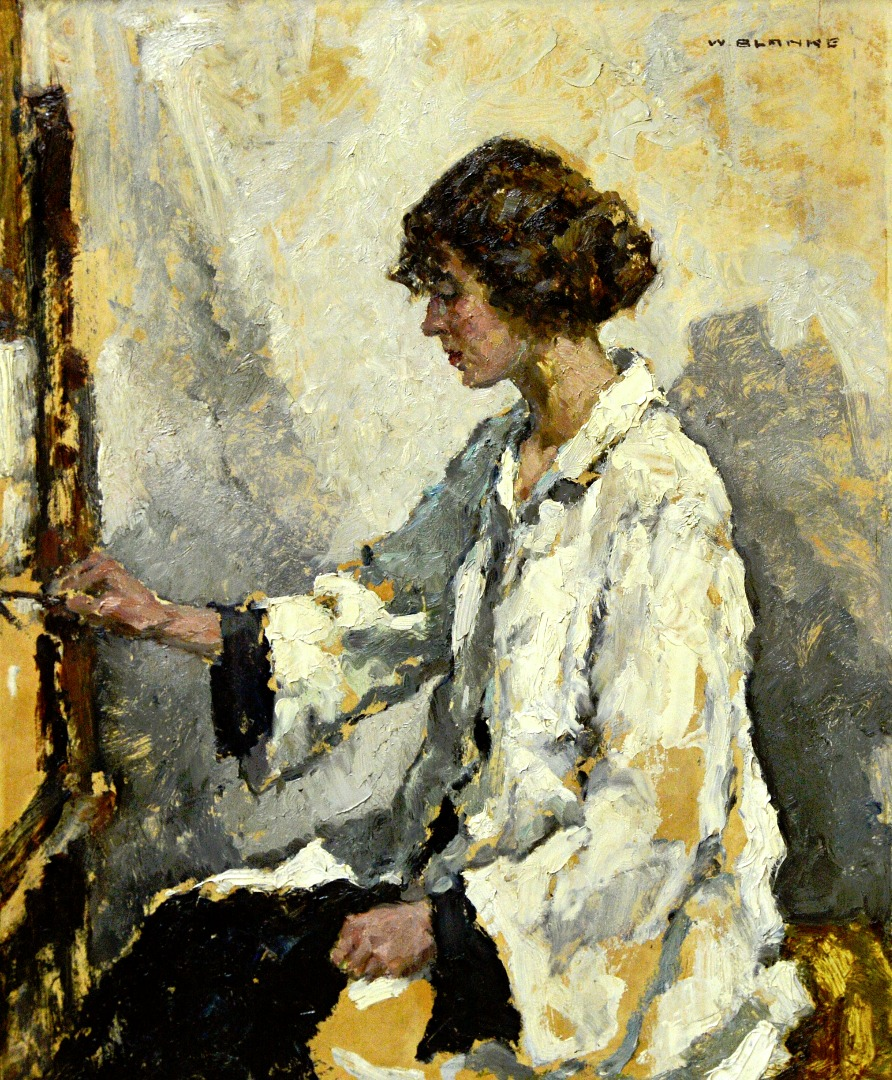
Woman painting at an easel

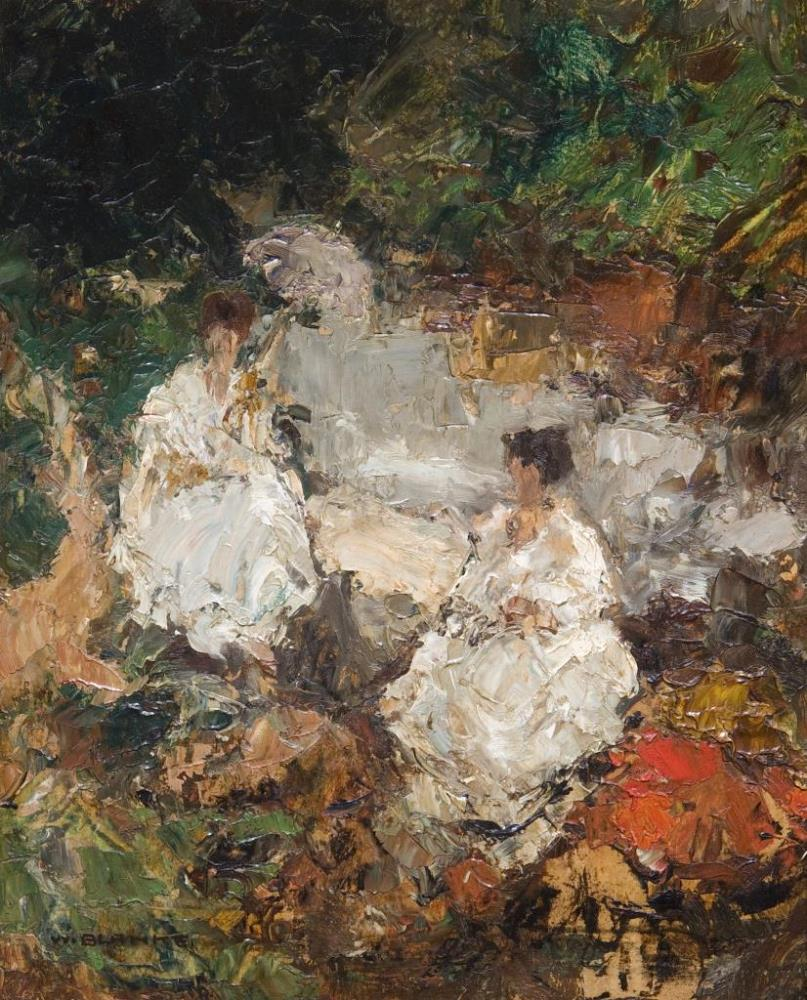
Girls in the Park

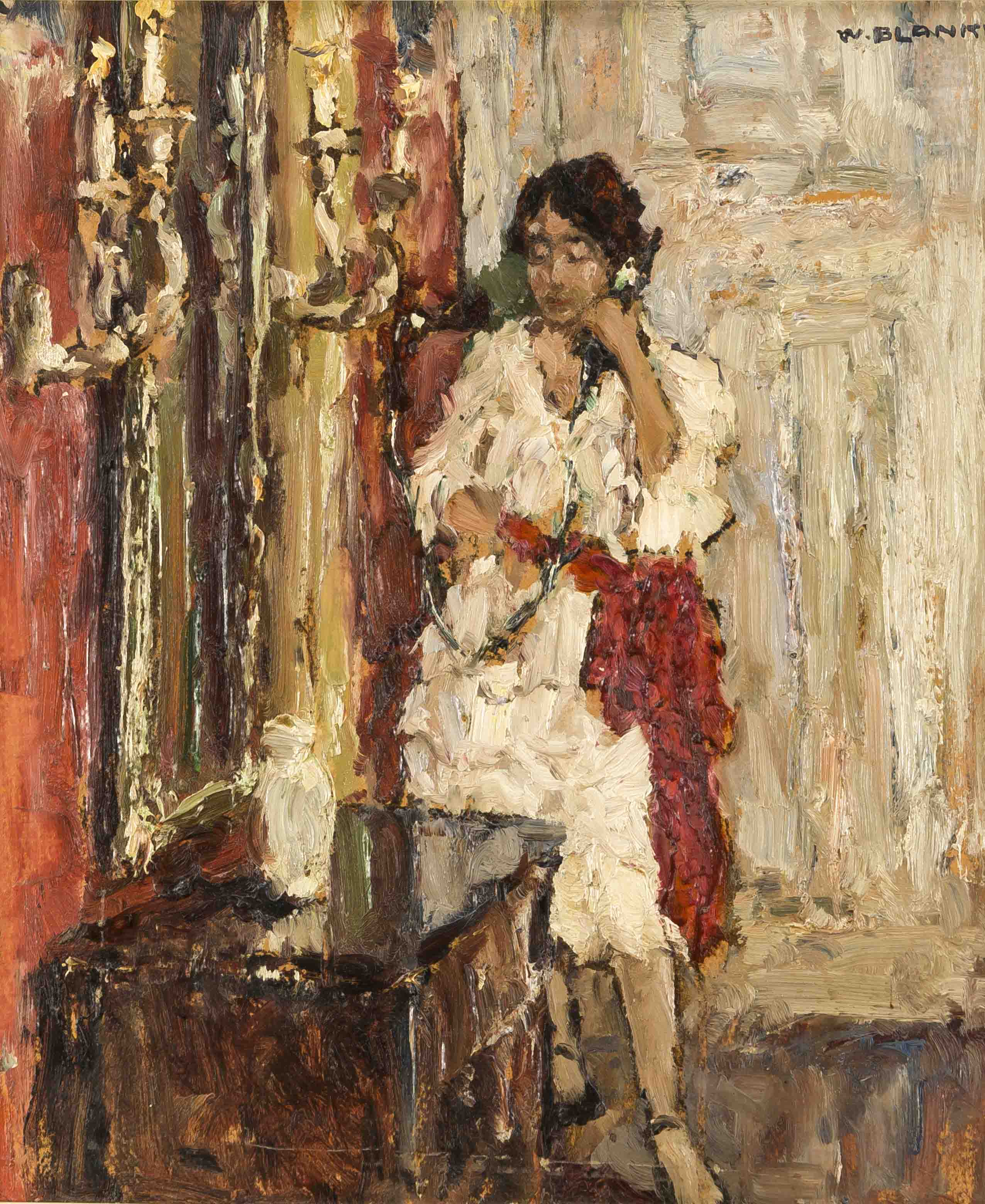
Lady on the phone
