= List of Fantasy Island episodes =

This is a list of episodes of the 1977–84 television series Fantasy Island. This series consists of two 2-hour TV movies and seven seasons of 1-hour episodes. The 1-hour episodes have multiple titles, referencing the simultaneous storylines contained within.

== Series overview ==
Season	Episodes	Originally released		Rank	Rating
Season	Episodes	First released	Last released	Rank	Rating
TV movies	2	January 14, 1977	January 20, 1978	—N/a	—N/a
1	14	January 28, 1978	May 20, 1978	17	21.4 (Note: Tied with Barney Miller)
2	25	September 16, 1978	May 13, 1979	22	20.8
3	23	September 17, 1979	May 17, 1980	28	20.1
4	24	October 25, 1980	May 23, 1981	17	20.7 (Note: Tied with Trapper John, M.D. and Diff'rent Strokes)
5	22	October 10, 1981	May 8, 1982	30	18.3
6	22	October 16, 1982	May 14, 1983	37	—N/a
7	22	October 8, 1983	May 19, 1984	49	15.3

== TV movies ==
Title	Directed by	Written by	Original release date
"Fantasy Island"	Richard Lang	Gene Levitt	January 14, 1977
"Return to Fantasy Island"	George McCowan	Marc Brandell	January 20, 1978

== Episodes ==
=== Season 1 (1978) ===
No. overall	No. in season	Title	Original release date
1	1	"Escape" / "Cinderella Girls"	January 28, 1978
2	2	"Bet a Million" / "Mr. Irresistible"	February 4, 1978
3	3	"The Prince" / "The Sheriff"	February 11, 1978
4	4	"Family Reunion" / "Voodoo"	February 18, 1978
5	5	"Lady of the Evening" / "The Racer"	February 25, 1978
6	6	"Treasure Hunt" / "Beauty Contest"	March 11, 1978
7	7	"The Funny Girl" / "Butch and Sundance"	March 18, 1978
8	8	"Superstar" / "Salem"	March 25, 1978
9	9	"Trouble, My Lovely" / "The Common Man"	April 1, 1978
10	10	"The Over-the-Hill Caper" / "Poof, You're a Movie Star"	April 15, 1978
11	11	"Reunion" / "Anniversary"	April 29, 1978
12	12	"King for a Day" / "Instant Family"	May 6, 1978
13	13	"Fool for a Client" / "Double Your Pleasure"	May 15, 1978
14	14	"Call Me Lucky" / "Torch Song"	May 20, 1978

=== Season 2 (1978–79) ===
No. overall	No. in season	Title	Original release date
15	1	"Homecoming" / "The Sheikh"	September 16, 1978
16	2	"The Big Dipper" / "The Pirate"	September 23, 1978
17	3	"The Beachcomber" / "The Last Whodunnit"	September 30, 1978
18	4	"Best Seller" / "The Tomb"	October 14, 1978
19	5	"I Want to Get Married" / "The Jewel Thief"	October 21, 1978
20	6	"War Games" / "Queen of the Boston Bruisers"	October 28, 1978
21	7	"Let the Good Times Roll" / "Nightmare" / "The Tiger"	November 4, 1978
22	8	"Return" / "The Toughest Man Alive"	November 11, 1978
23	9	"The Appointment" / "Mr. Tattoo"	November 18, 1978
24	10	"The Flight of the Great Yellow Bird" / "The Island of Lost Women"	November 25, 1978
25	11	"Carnival" / "The Vaudevillians"	December 2, 1978
26	12	"Charlie's Cherubs" / "Stalag 3"	December 9, 1978
27	13	"The Lady and the Longhorn" / "Vampire"	December 16, 1978
28	14	"Seance" / "The Treasure"	January 13, 1979
29	15	"Cowboy" / "Substitute Wife"	January 20, 1979
30	16	"Photographs" / "Royal Flush"	January 27, 1979
31	17	"The Stripper" / "The Boxer"	February 10, 1979
32	18	"Casting Director" / "Pentagram" / "A Little Ball"	February 17, 1979
33	19	"Spending Spree" / "The Hunted"	February 24, 1979
34	20	"Birthday Party" / "Ghostbreaker"	March 3, 1979
35	21	"Yesterday's Love" / "Fountain of Youth"	March 17, 1979
36	22	"The Comic" / "The Golden Hour"	May 5, 1979
37	23	"Fantasy Island Sunday Special: "Cornelius and Alphonse" / "The Choice"	May 6, 1979
38	24	"Bowling" / "Command Performance"	May 12, 1979
39	25	"Fantasy Island Sunday Special: "Amusement Park" / "Rock Stars"	May 13, 1979

=== Season 3 (1979–80) ===
No. overall	No. in season	Title	Original release date
40	1	"Hit Man" / "The Swimmer"	September 7, 1979
41	2	"Goose for the Gander" / "Stuntman"	September 14, 1979
42	3	"Tattoo: the Love God" / "Magnolia Blossoms"	September 21, 1979
43	4	"Baby" / "Marathon: Battle of the Sexes"	October 5, 1979
44	5	"The Chain Gang" / "The Boss"	October 20, 1979
45	6	"The Red Baron" / "Young at Heart"	October 27, 1979
46	7	"The Wedding"	November 3, 1979
47	8	"The Handyman" / "Tattoo's Romance"	November 10, 1979
48	9	"The Dancer" / "Nobody's There"	November 17, 1979
49	10	"Class of '69" / "The Pug"	November 24, 1979
50	11	"The Mermaid" / "The Victim"	December 1, 1979
51	12	"The Cheerleaders" / "Marooned"	December 8, 1979
52	13	"The Inventor" / "On the Other Side"	December 15, 1979
53	14	"Lookalikes" / "The Winemaker"	December 22, 1979
54	15	"Unholy Wedlock" / "Elizabeth"	January 12, 1980
55	16	"Rogues and Riches" / "Stark Terror"	January 19, 1980
56	17	"Playgirl" / "Smith's Valhalla"	January 26, 1980
57	18	"Aphrodite" / "Dr. Jekyll and Miss Hyde"	February 2, 1980
58	19	"The Swinger" / "Terrors of the Mind"	February 9, 1980
59	20	"Nona" / "One Million B.C."	March 1, 1980
60	21	"Jungle Man" / "Mary Ann and Miss Sophisticate"	March 8, 1980
61	22	"My Fair Pharaoh" / "The Power"	May 10, 1980
62	23	"Eagleman" / "Children of Mentu"	May 17, 1980

=== Season 4 (1980–81) ===
No. overall	No. in season	Title	Original release date
63	1	"The Devil and Mandy Breem" / "Instant Millionaire"	October 25, 1980
64	2	"Flying Aces" / "The Mermaid Returns"	November 1, 1980
65	3	"The Skater's Edge" / "Concerto of Death" / "The Last Great Race"	November 8, 1980
66	4	"Don Quixote" / "The Sex Symbol"	November 15, 1980
67	5	"The Love Doctor" / "The Pleasure Palace" / "Possessed"	November 22, 1980
68	6	"With Affection, Jack the Ripper" / "Gigolo"	November 29, 1980
69	7	"The Invisible Woman" / "The Snowbird"	December 6, 1980
70	8	"Crescendo" / "Three Feathers"	December 20, 1980
71	9	"My Late Lover" / "Sanctuary"	January 3, 1981
72	10	"High Off the Hog" / "Reprisal"	January 10, 1981
73	11	"The Artist and the Lady" / "Elizabeth's Baby"	January 17, 1981
74	12	"The Heroine" / "The Warrior"	January 24, 1981
75	13	"The Man from Yesterday" / "World's Most Desirable Woman"	January 31, 1981
76	14	"The Chateau" / "White Lightning"	February 7, 1981
77	15	"Loving Strangers" / "Something Borrowed, Something Blue"	February 14, 1981
78	16	"Chorus Girl" / "Surrogate Father"	February 21, 1981
79	17	"Also Rans" / "Portrait of Solange"	February 28, 1981
80	18	"The Searcher" / "The Way We Weren't"	March 7, 1981
81	19	"The Proxy Billionaire" / "The Experiment"	March 21, 1981
82	20	"Delphine" / "The Unkillable"	April 11, 1981
83	21	"Basin Street" / "The Devil's Triangle"	May 2, 1981
84	22	"Hard Knocks" / "Lady Godiva"	May 9, 1981
85	23	"Man-Beast" / "Ole Island Opry"	May 16, 1981
86	24	"Paquito's Birthday" / "Technical Advisor"	May 23, 1981

=== Season 5 (1981–82) ===
No. overall	No. in season	Title	Original release date
87	1	"Show Me a Hero..." / "Slamdunk"	October 10, 1981
First appearance of Wendy Schaal as Julie
88	2	"The Devil and Mr. Roarke" / "Ziegfeld Girls" / "Kid Corey Rides Again"	October 17, 1981
89	3	"Cyrano" / "The Magician"	October 24, 1981
90	4	"The Last Cowboy" / "The Lady and the Monster"	October 31, 1981
91	5	"Mr. Nobody" / "La Liberatora"	November 7, 1981
92	6	"Druids" / "A Night in a Harem"	November 14, 1981
93	7	"The Perfect Husband" / "Volcano"	November 21, 1981
94	8	"Lillian Russell" / "The Lagoon"	November 28, 1981
95	9	"Romance Times Three" / "Night of the Tormented Soul"	December 5, 1981
96	10	"A Very Strange Affair" / "The Sailor"	January 2, 1982
97	11	"House of Dolls" / "Wuthering Heights"	January 9, 1982
98	12	"The Magic Camera" / "Mata Hari" / "Valerie"	January 16, 1982
99	13	"King Arthur in Mr. Roarke's Court" / "Shadow Games"	January 23, 1982
100	14	"Daddy's Little Girl" / "The Whistle"	January 30, 1982
101	15	"The Case Against Mr. Roarke" / "Save Sherlock Holmes"	February 6, 1982
102	16	"The Challenge" / "A Genie Named Joe"	February 13, 1982
103	17	"Funny Man" / "Tattoo, the Matchmaker"	February 20, 1982
104	18	"Sitting Duck" / "Sweet Suzi Swann"	March 6, 1982
105	19	"Face of Love" / "Image of Celeste"	March 20, 1982
106	20	"Forget-Me-Not" / "The Quiz Masters"	April 10, 1982
107	21	"The Big Bet" / "Nancy and the Thunderbirds"	May 1, 1982
Final appearance of Wendy Schaal as Julie
108	22	"The Ghost's Story" / "The Spoilers"	May 8, 1982

=== Season 6 (1982–83) ===
No. overall	No. in season	Title	Original release date
109	1	"Curse of the Moreaus" / "My Man Friday"	October 16, 1982
110	2	"Dancing Lady" / "The Final Round"	October 23, 1982
111	3	"The Perfect Gentleman" / "Legend"	October 30, 1982
112	4	"The Angel's Triangle" / "Natchez Bound"	November 6, 1982
113	5	"Everybody Goes to Gilley's" / "Face of Fire"	November 20, 1982
114	6	"The Beautiful Skeptic" / "The Lost Platoon"	November 27, 1982
115	7	"Roller Derby Dolls" / "Thanks a Million"	December 4, 1982
116	8	"The Kleptomaniac" / "Thank God, I'm a Country Girl"	December 11, 1982
117	9	"Naughty Marietta" / "The Winning Ticket"	January 8, 1983
118	10	"Operation Breakout" / "Candy Kisses"	January 15, 1983
119	11	"The Songwriter" / "Queen of the Soaps"	January 22, 1983
120	12	"The Tallowed Image" / "Room and Bard"	January 29, 1983
121	13	"Midnight Waltz" / "Let Them Eat Cake"	February 12, 1983
122	14	"Revenge of the Forgotten" / "Charo"	February 19, 1983
123	15	"Return to the Cotton Club" / "No Friends Like Old Friends"	February 26, 1983
124	16	"Eternal Flame" / "A Date with Burt"	March 5, 1983
125	17	"King of Burlesque" / "Death Games"	March 12, 1983
126	18	"The Devil Stick" / "Touch and Go"	March 19, 1983
127	19	"Edward" / "Extraordinary Miss Jones"	April 9, 1983
128	20	"What's the Matter with Kids?" / "Island of Horrors"	April 16, 1983
129	21	"Remember When..."	May 7, 1983
130	22	"Love Island" / "The Sisters"	May 14, 1983
Final appearance of Hervé Villechaize as Tattoo

=== Season 7 (1983–84) ===
No. overall	No. in season	Title	Original release date
131	1	"Forbidden Love" / "The Other Man -- Mr. Roarke"	October 8, 1983
First appearance of Christopher Hewett as Lawrence
132	2	"The Big Switch" / "The Hooker's Holiday"	October 15, 1983
133	3	"Nurses Night Out"	October 22, 1983
134	4	"God Child" / "Curtain Call"	October 29, 1983
135	5	"Roarke's Sacrifice" / "The Butler's Affair"	November 12, 1983
136	6	"Second Time Around" / "Three's a Crowd"	November 19, 1983
137	7	"The Wedding Picture" / "Castaways"	November 26, 1983
138	8	"Random Choices" / "My Mommy, the Swinger"	December 3, 1983
139	9	"The Fantasy Island Girl" / "Saturday's Child"	December 10, 1983
140	10	"Goin' on Home" / "Ambitious Lady"	January 7, 1984
141	11	"Games People Play" / "The Sweet Life"	January 14, 1984
142	12	"To Fly with Eagles" / "The High Cost of Loving"	January 21, 1984
143	13	"Ladies Choice" / "Skin Deep"	January 28, 1984
144	14	"Lady of the House" / "Mrs. Brandell's Favorites"	February 25, 1984
145	15	"Dark Secret" / "The Outrageous Mr. Smith"	March 3, 1984
146	16	"Baby on Demand" / "The Last Dogfight"	March 10, 1984
147	17	"Awakening of Love" / "The Imposter"	March 17, 1984
148	18	"Mermaid and the Matchmaker" / "The Obsolete Man"	March 24, 1984
149	19	"Lost and Found" / "Dick Turpin's Last Ride"	April 7, 1984
150	20	"Don Juan's Last Affair" / "Final Adieu"	April 14, 1984
151	21	"Bojangles and the Dancer" / "Deuces Are Wild"	May 12, 1984
152	22	"Surrogate Mother" / "The Ideal Woman"	May 19, 1984
