= Clare Jaynes =

Pen named used by two American women who were co-authors in the 1940s

Clare Jaynes was a combined pseudonym of co-writers Jane Mayer and Clara Spiegel. Together the two women wrote, and are most well known for Instruct My Sorrows, a novel used as the basis of the film My Reputation starring Barbara Stanwyck.

== Collaboration ==
Clare Spiegel and Jane Mayer began their collaboration in 1940, writing short stories that were published in magazines such as The New Yorker and Mademoiselle. Later, they wrote four novels together: These Are the Times, This Eager Heart, The Early Frost, and Instruct My Sorrow.

In 1953, the Wilson Library Bulletin described the two women as:

brown-haired, brown-eyed; she is five feet three inches tall, and is of German-American ancestry. She was born in Kansas City, and again in Chicago the following year. She attended Vassar for one year, and was graduated after completing a four-year course at Vassar. And, although she already had a husband whom she married in 1923, she was again lawfully married in 1927. She has two children, also three, and her home is in two of Chicago's northshore suburbs about a mile apart.

- making the dual nature of the authorship clear.

== Jane Mayer ==
Mayer was born in 1904 in Kansas City, Missouri. When her father forbade her to become a professional writer, she took on a pen name and continued to write for the Kansas City Star, writing book reviews. While at Vassar College, Mayer met Clara Spiegel who became her co-writer. Together they wrote under the pen name Clare Jaynes. Clare (from Clara Spiegel) and Jaynes (from Jane Mayer.) In addition to Instruct My Sorrows, the pair wrote three other novels together. One of their stories, "Coming of Age," won an O. Henry Award in 1942. Jane married David Mayer whom she met on a visit to Chicago in 1927 after being introduced to him by Clare Spiegel. Mayer wrote the novel "The Year of the White Trees," published in 1958, using her own name. She also wrote travel articles for the Chicago Tribune and short stories for Collier's. In addition, she penned two books for children, one about Dolley Madison, and another about Betsy Ross. Mayer stopped writing after her husband's death in 1960. She became active in the Midland Authors Association, women's boards, and the Arts Club of Chicago. She died on September 3, 2001, in Northwestern Memorial Hospital in Chicago at the age of 97. When she died she left two sons, David and Philip, seven grandchildren, and four great grandchildren.

== Clara Spiegel ==
Clara Elizabeth Gatzert was born on December 6, 1904, in her parents house at 4915 Washington Park Court on the south side of Chicago. Her father, August Gatzert, was born in Germany. He manufactured clothing. Her mother was Isabel Rosalie Florsheim, born and raised in Chicago. Isabel's father, Simon, made corsets, and was also born in Germany. Later, she lived in Ketchum, Idaho, in a house she built to her specifications, where she lived for over 40 years. She attended the Faulkner School for Girls, and Vassar College, where she met Jane Mayer. She spoke four languages, and was an avid hunter and all-around sportswoman. She was friends, and hunted with Ernest Hemingway and Gary Cooper. She was married to mail-order magnate Frederick Spiegel, the past president of Spiegel Inc., the Spiegels had two sons, Andrew and William. In 1949 the couple divorced. She died in Wood River Medical Center in Sun Valley, Idaho on Monday, October 20, 1997, at the age of 92. Her son William had died just a few months before her death. She was survived by her older son Andrew, five granddaughters and three great grandchildren.

== Bibliography ==
- Instruct My Sorrows (1942)
- These Are the Times (1944)
- This Eager Heart (1947)
- The Early Frost (1952)
