= Henry Blanke =

American film producer (1901-1981)

- Born: Heinz Blanke; December 30, 1901; Steglitz, Berlin, Germany
- Died: May 28, 1981 (aged 79); Los Angeles, California, U.S.
- Awards: Golden Globe Award for Best Motion Picture – Drama; 1948 The Treasure of the Sierra Madre; NBR Award for Best Film; 1959 The Nun's Story

Henry Blanke (December 30, 1901 – May 28, 1981) was a German-born film producer who also worked as an assistant director, supervisor, writer, and production manager. He was nominated for the Academy Award for Best Picture for The Nun’s Story (1959).

== Biography ==
He was born Heinz Blanke in Steglitz, Berlin, Germany, the son of painter Wilhelm Blanke. He began his career as a film cutter in 1920. Blanke became an assistant to Ernst Lubitsch and moved to Hollywood with him to make films with Warner Bros. including The Marriage Circle (1924). He produced nine films in his native Germany before emigrating to Hollywood.

After Lubitsch left, Blanke stayed on as an assistant director. He returned to Germany to be the production manager of Fritz Lang's 1927 film Metropolis and then Warners re-hired him and put him in charge of German co-productions. He eventually became a power at Warner's becoming production supervisor and working at the studio for over 25 years.

When Hal B. Wallis became production chief after Darryl F. Zanuck left in 1933, Blanke and Sam Bischoff were the main producers at the studio. In 1945, Blanke signed a 15-year contract with the studio and by 1953, was one of only three producers left, along with Bischoff and David Weisbart.

Among his Hollywood producing credits are: Of Human Bondage (1946), The Treasure of the Sierra Madre (1948) and The Fountainhead (1949). When the announced production of The Life of Emile Zola (1937) came under fire from Georg Gyssling, the Nazi German consul to the United States (due to its portrayal of Alfred Dreyfus, who was of Jewish descent), Blanke lied to him, telling him the Dreyfus affair was only a small part of the film.

The Online Archive of California has a transcript of his oral recollections.

== Partial filmography ==
As producer unless otherwise indicated.

- Dearie (1927) (assistant director to Archie Mayo)
- Brass Knuckles (1927) (assistant to Lloyd Bacon)
- My Sister and I (1929)
- The Dance Goes On (1930)
- You'll Be in My Heart (1930)
- The Sacred Flame (1931)
- Mystery of the Wax Museum (1933) (uncredited)
- Goodbye Again (1933) (uncredited)
- Bureau of Missing Persons (1933) (uncredited)
- Convention City (1933)
- Easy to Love (1934) (uncredited)
- Fashions of 1934 (1934) (uncredited)
- Fog Over Frisco (1934) (uncredited supervising producer)
- Dr. Monica (1934) (uncredited)
- I Am a Thief (1934) (uncredited)
- The Girl from 10th Avenue (1934) (uncredited)
- The Case of the Lucky Legs (1935) (uncredited)
- A Midsummer Night's Dream (uncredited)
- The Green Pastures (1935) (supervising producer)
- Anthony Adverse (1936) (uncredited supervising producer)
- The Case of the Velvet Claws (1936) (uncredited)
- The Life of Emile Zola (1937) (uncredited associate producer)
- White Banners (1938) (uncredited associate producer)
- Jezebel (1938) (uncredited associate producer)
- The Adventures of Robin Hood (1938) (uncredited associate producer)
- Four Daughters (1938) (uncredited associate producer)
- Juarez (1939) (associate producer)
- Daughters Courageous (1939) (associate producer)
- The Old Maid (1939) (associate producer)
- We Are Not Alone (1939) (associate producer)
- Saturday's Children (1940) (associate producer)
- The Sea Hawk (1940) (associate producer)
- A Dispatch from Reuter's (1940) (associate producer)
- Four Mothers (1940) (associate producer)
- The Sea Wolf (1941) (associate producer)
- The Great Lie (1941) (associate producer)
- The Maltese Falcon (1941) (associate producer)
- Blues in the Night (1941) (associate producer)
- The Gay Sisters (1942)
- Edge of Darkness (1943)
- The Constant Nymph (1943)
- Old Acquaintance (1943)
- The Mask of Dimitrios (1944)
- Roughly Speaking (1945)
- My Reputation (1946)
- Of Human Bondage (1946)
- Deception (1946)
- Cry Wolf (1947)
- Deep Valley (1947)
- Escape Me Never (1947)
- The Treasure of the Sierra Madre (1948)
- Winter Meeting (1948)
- The Woman in White (1948)
- June Bride (1948)
- The Fountainhead (1949)
- Beyond the Forest (1949)
- Bright Leaf (1950)
- Lightning Strikes Twice (1951)
- Goodbye, My Fancy (1951)
- Tomorrow Is Another Day (1951)
- Come Fill the Cup (1951)
- Room for One More (1952)
- The Iron Mistress (1952)
- She's Back on Broadway (1953)
- So This Is Love (1953)
- So Big (1953)
- Phantom of the Rue Morgue (1954)
- Lucky Me (1954)
- King Richard and the Crusaders (1954)
- Young at Heart (1954)
- The McConnell Story (1955)
- Sincerely Yours (1956)
- Serenade (1956)
- Too Much, Too Soon (1958)
- Westbound (1959)
- The Nun's Story (1959)
- The Miracle (1959)
- Ice Palace (1960)
- Cash McCall (1960)
- The Sins of Rachel Cade (1961)
- Hell Is for Heroes (1962)
