= Grace Zaring Stone =

American novelist

Grace Zaring Stone (January 9, 1891 – September 29, 1991) was an American novelist and short-story writer. She is perhaps best known for having three of her novels made into films: The Bitter Tea of General Yen, Winter Meeting, and Escape. She also used the pseudonym Ethel Vance.

== Biography ==
Born in New York City in 1891, Zaring Stone was the great-great-granddaughter of social reformer Robert Owen. Her mother died during her childhood. She started writing in St. Thomas in the Virgin Islands, where she lived with her husband, Ellis Spencer Stone (1889-1956), later a commodore in the U.S. Navy (where he commanded all of the aircraft carriers at the time of the 1941 Pearl Harbor attack, though none were lost as none was there that day). Later, she and her husband moved to Stonington, Connecticut. They had one child, the author and gardener Eleanor Perenyi.

Zaring Stone had used the pseudonym of Ethel Vance to write her 1939 anti-Nazi thriller Escape to avoid jeopardizing her daughter, who was living in occupied Europe during the Second World War. Editions of her books after World War II sometimes credited her as "Grace Zaring Stone (Ethel Vance)", as Escape was her best-known book at the time of the war. Three of her novels --The Bitter Tea of General Yen, Escape, and Winter Meeting—were adapted for film. In 1955, Escape was translated into German and published in Germany as Die Flucht.

== Death ==
Zaring Stone died on September 29, 1991, at the Mary Elizabeth Nursing Center in Mystic, Connecticut, aged 100.

== Bibliography ==
- Letters to a Djinn, 1922
- The Heaven and Earth of Dona Elena, 1929
- The Bitter Tea of General Yen, 1930
- The Almond Tree, 1931 (published in England as All the Daughters of Music)
- The Cold Journey, 1934
- Escape, 1939 (as "Ethel Vance")
- Reprisal, 1942 (as "Ethel Vance")
- Winter Meeting, 1946 (as "Ethel Vance")
- The Secret Thread, 1949 (as "Ethel Vance")
- The Grotto, 1951 (published in England as My Son is Mortal under the "Ethel Vance" pseudonym)
- Althea, 1962
- Dear Deadly Cara, 1968

The Bitter Tea of General Yen, The Cold Journey, Escape, Reprisal and Winter Meeting were published as Armed Services Editions during WWII.
