= Geraghty =

Geraghty and Garaghty (/ˈɡɛrəti/ GHERR-ə-tee) are Irish surnames. Originally written in a Gaelic form as Mag Oireachtaigh (or MacGeraghty in English), the name is derived from the word oireachtach, referring to a member of an assembly. The name of the modern national legislative body in Ireland, the Oireachtas comes from the same Gaelic root.

== History ==
The MacGeraghty clan are descended from the Siol Muireadaigh of the Kingdom of Connacht, the same Gaelic lineage and homeland as the Ó Conchubhair dynasty. Their lands were originally situated in the Barony of Roscommon.

Their original name was Ó Roduibh before they took the name Mag Oireachtaigh. Ó Roduibh means "descendant of Rodub". The clan's head was one of the four Royal Chiefs under O'Conor and appears often in Connacht records. Later bardic verse calls their territory Muintir Roduibh "of royal judgments" and praises the chief as a horseman and fearless warrior. They were rulers of Clann Tomaltaigh and the Muintir Roduib and are referred to in the topographical poem Triallam timcheall na Fódla by Seán Mór Ó Dubhagáin

Members of this Clan are said to have named the island of Innis Murray after themselves as they were formerly chiefs of the Siol Murray.

The MacGeraghty clan are associated with Clan Taidg as well as the Gaelic Kingdoms of Uí Briúin and Uí Maine.

A Chief of the name, called McGiriaght is listed in the Composition Book of Connacht in 1585, as seated in the Barony of Athlone.

Geoffrey Keating’s History of Ireland records that:

"Mac Oiraghty of the steeds was the ruling chief of Muintir Roduiv of rightful laws - A fearless warrior as he ranged the woods"

The clan name MacGeraghty lead to the anglicised name Geraghty, descendants of the family are still found in large numbers in County Galway, County Mayo, County Roscommon, County Sligo and among the Irish diaspora.

== Related surnames ==
Related surnames that derive from the same Gaelic root are:

- McGarrity
- Garrity
- Garraty
- Gerety
- Gerrity
- Gerahty
- Garraty
- MacGeraghty
- McGeraghty
- McGerity
- MacGartie
- MacGarty
- Gerighty
- Gerighaty
- Geraty
- Gerty
- Gurty
- Guerty
- Jerety
- Gearty

== People ==
The name Geraghty may refer to:

- Agnes Geraghty (1907–1974), swimmer
- Barry Geraghty (born 1979), jockey
- Ben Geraghty (1912–1963), baseball player
- Brian Geraghty (born 1974), actor
- Carmelita Geraghty (1901–1966), actress
- David Geraghty (born 1975), singer-songwriter
- Des Geraghty (born 1943), politician
- Donn Óge Mag Oireachtaigh (died 1230), Irish lord
- Edward Geraghty (1956-2001) FDNY Chief - killed 9/11/2001
- Graham Geraghty (born 1973), footballer
- Jack Geraghty (1934–2023), mayor
- James Geraghty (Australian politician) (1896–1960), politician
- Jim Geraghty, author and activist
- Johnny Geraghty (born 1942), sportsperson
- Kate Geraghty (born 1973), photojournalist
- Marita Geraghty, actress
- Martin Geraghty, comic book artist
- Michael Geraghty (born 1952), Attorney General of Alaska
- Paul Geraghty (born 1959), author and illustrator
- Paul L Geraghty (born 1954), artist and painter
- Robyn Geraghty, politician
- Sarah Geraghty, (born 1974), Northern District Judge of Georgia
- Shane Geraghty (born 1986), rugby union player
- Tara Geraghty-Moats (born 1993), ski jumper
- Thomas F. Geraghty, jurist
- Thomas J. Geraghty (1883–1945), screenwriter
- Tony Geraghty, writer and journalist
- Garry Marsh, born Leslie March Geraghty, actor
- Marcela Guerty, born Marcela Geraghty (1968), argentine actress and scriptwriter. https://es.wikipedia.org/wiki/Marcela_Guerty#Teatro
- Cecilia Guerty, born Cecilia Geraghty (1967), argentine scriptwriter.
- Eugenia Guerty, born Eugenia Geraghty (1975, argentine actress. https://es.wikipedia.org/wiki/Eugenia_Guerty
- Santiago Guerty, born Santiago Geraghty (1972), argentine scriptwriter.
- Pacho Guerty, born Patricio Geraghty (1970), argentine actor and director of photography.
- Felipe Geraghty (born 1993), argentine rugby union player of Dendermonde Rugby Club, Belgium (brother of the Guerty's)
- Brenda Geraghty (born 1991), argentine dubbing actress.

== See also ==
- Barony of Roscommon
- Clan Taidg
- Connacht
- Connachta
- Síol Murray
- Uí Briúin
- Uí Maine
