= Say, Darling =

Play

- Poster
- Music: Jule Styne
- Lyrics: Betty Comden; Adolph Green
- Book: Abe Burrows; Marian Bissell; Richard Bissell
- Basis: Richard Bissell's autobiographical book Say, Darling.
- Productions: 1958 Broadway

Say, Darling is a three-act comic play by Abe Burrows and Richard and Marian Bissell about the creation of a Broadway musical. While the play featured nine original songs with lyrics by Betty Comden and Adolph Green and music by Jule Styne, all the songs are presented as either rehearsal or audition material.

== Background ==
In a case of art imitating life not once, but twice, the show is an adaptation of Richard Bissell's semi-autobiographical novel of the same name which chronicled his experience adapting his novel 7½ Cents for The Pajama Game: namely, a stage adaptation of a novel, which itself concerns the musical adaptation of a book.

It focuses on Jack Jordan (David Wayne), who is brought to Broadway to help develop his best-seller into a musical for leading lady Irene Lovelle (Vivian Blaine). His journey provides him - and the audience - with an education about what goes on behind-the scenes on the Great White Way, from auditions to rehearsals, to rewrites in hotel rooms to feuds among cast members, all under the watchful eye of veteran stage producer/director Richard Hackett (Jerome Cowan), loosely based on George Abbott, and a very young fledgling co-producer, Ted Snow (Robert Morse) whose financial acumen greatly outweighs his show business savvy. Actor Morse was widely thought to be imitating producer Harold Prince, who had co-produced The Pajama Game, because of their similar physical appearance.

== Original production ==
The Broadway production, directed by Burrows and choreographed by Matt Mattox, opened on April 3, 1958 at the ANTA Playhouse, transferring to the Martin Beck Theatre for the last five weeks of its 332-performance run, where it closed on January 17, 1959. In addition to David Wayne as Jack Jordan, Vivian Blaine as Irene Lovelle, and Robert Morse as Ted Snow, the cast included Johnny Desmond (Rudy Lorraine), Jerome Cowan (Richard Hackett), Horace McMahon (Schatzie Harris), and Constance Ford (Frankie Jordan). Eddie Albert replaced Wayne later in the run. Appearing in small roles as chorus performers were Elliott Gould and Virginia Martin. Morse was nominated for the Tony Award for Best Featured Actor in a Play and won the Theatre World Award for his performance.

The original 1957 Broadway production featured only two pianos, but RCA Victor released a fully orchestrated original cast recording of the score, leading many to conclude that Say, Darling was actually a musical.

== Critical reception ==
Reviewing the original Broadway production, Brooks Atkinson of The New York Times called it "hardly more than a clever college show" and a "higgledy-piggledy yarn."

In the New York Daily News, critic John Chapman said the play could be "fixed up," but called Morse "splendid" and praised Wayne's and Blaine's performances.

== Other productions ==
The New York City Center Light Opera Company's production of Say, Darling opened on February 25, 1959, a few weeks after the musical's Broadway closing. Many of the cast members returned for this short revival, including Morse, Matt Mattox, Mitchell Gregg and Elliott Gould; and joining the company were Orson Bean (Jack Jordan), Mindy Carson (Irene Lovelle), David Atkinson (Rudy Lorraine), Betsy von Furstenberg (Frankie Jordan) and Jack Waldron (Schatzie Harris). This run closed on March 8, 1959, after only 16 performances.

The play was revived Off-Broadway at the West End Theatre in New York City for 16 performances in May through June 1996 under the direction of Robert Armin.

An original cast recording was released by RCA Victor with orchestrations and musical direction by Sid Ramin. The 2008 CD release on DRG Records was re-edited from the first-generation master recording and interpolated five dialogue lead-ins that were not included on the 1958 LP release. The "long-lost" Robert Morse dialogue was not included.

== Songs ==
Act I

- Try to Love Me
- It's Doom
- The Husking Bee

Act II

- It's the Second Time You Meet That Matters
- Chief of Love
- Let the Lower Lights Be Burning (by Philip P. Bliss)
- Say, Darling
- The Carnival Song

Act III

- Try to Love Me
- Dance Only with Me
- Something's Always Happening on the River

Something’s Always Happening on the River was recorded in June 1958 by Bob Scobey's Frisco Band and released on RCA Victor's eponymous named Something’s Always Happening on the River.
