= Rosenstrasse =

Rosenstrasse (or Rosenstraße) is a street in Berlin.

Rosenstrasse may also refer to:

- Rosenstrasse protests, street protests, Berlin, 1943
- Rosenstrasse (film), 2003 film by Margarethe von Trotta
- Rosenstrasse (game), 2022 historical indie role-playing game by Jessica Hammer and Moyra Turkington
