= Thomas P. Gerrity =

American academic

Thomas P. Gerrity (b. July 13, 1941) is the former dean of the Wharton School of Business at the University of Pennsylvania where he was also Joseph J. Aresty Professor of Management. Prior to Wharton, he was the Chairman and CEO of the Index Group.

== Early life ==
Gerrity was born July 13, 1941 in Savannah, Georgia. He was the son of Air Force general Thomas Patrick Gerrity and his wife Margaret.

Gerrity earned his S.B. and S.M. in electrical engineering from MIT in 1963 and 1964 respectively. At MIT, he was also a wrestler. He attended Oxford University as a Rhodes Scholar, studying industrial economics. He earned his Ph.D. from the MIT Sloan School of Management in 1970.

== Career ==
While a graduate student at MIT, he was a cofounder with James Champy, an undergraduate roommate, and MIT classmates Richard Carpenter and Fred Luconi of the Index Group in 1969. MIT professor Michael Scott Morton directed the company at the beginning. The firm developed business software systems, building on work Gerrity had done during a graduate study field project developing "one of the first software programs for portfolio managers," according to the New York Times.

From 1970 to 1974, he split his time between serving on the Wharton faculty and the Index Group.

In 1974, Gerrity left MIT to join the Index Group full time. A 1983 restructuring transformed the Index Group into a consulting business with $6 million in annual revenues. It was sold to Computer Sciences Corporation in 1988 and Gerrity became the head of the firm's CSC Consulting unit. From there, he was recruited to become the head of the Wharton School in 1990 when Russell E. Palmer announced his own departure.

At Wharton, he oversaw a transformation of the school's curriculum that led to a large increase in the number of applicants to its MBA program and an increase in the school's ranking. A 1995 New York Times profile drew a connection between this reform of the school's curriculum and what Gerrity, James Champy, and others had done in the restructuring of the Index Group in 1983, dubbed "re-engineering the corporation," the subject of a 1993 book of that title by Champy and Michael Martin Hammer. This would develop into the business strategy known as business process re-engineering.

Gerrity stood down as dean of Wharton in 1999, but remained a professor.

In addition to serving as dean of Wharton, Gerrity served as a member of the Board of Directors of Fannie Mae from September 1991 to December 2006 and as the Chairman of the Audit Committee from January 1999 to May 2006. He was also a board member at Sunoco beginning in 1990 and remaining through at least 2009.

== Personal life ==
Gerrity has four children with his wife Anna. As of 2007, he lived in Haverford, Pennsylvania. He is a rock climber.
