= Gerahty =

Gerahty is a surname. Notable people with the surname include:

- Cecil Gerahty (1888–1938), English journalist
- Charles Cyril Gerahty (1888–1978), British colonial judge
- Digby George Gerahty (1898–1981), English novelist
- Peter Gerahty (1921–2013), British Army officer

== See also ==
- Geraghty
