= Thomas Gerrity =

Thomas Gerrity may refer to:

- Thomas Patrick Gerrity (1913–1968), United States Air Force general
- Thomas P. Gerrity, former dean and professor of management at the Wharton School of Business at the University of Pennsylvania
