= Garrity =

Garrity is a surname. Notable people with the surname include:

- Chris Garrity (born 1981), professional lacrosse goaltender
- Douglas Alan Garrity, American engineer
- Freddie Garrity (1936–2006), singer and actor in the 1960s pop band Freddie and the Dreamers
- George F. Garrity (1895–1967), United States Attorney for the District of Massachusetts
- Gregg Garrity (born 1960), former professional American football wide receiver
- Hank Garrity (disambiguation), several people
- Jack Garrity (1926–2015), retired ice hockey player
- James A. Garrity (1878–1944), New York state senator
- Jason Garrity (born 1993), English motorcycle speedway rider
- Ken Garrity (1935–2016), retired English professional footballer
- Pat Garrity (born 1976), retired American NBA basketball player
- Robert T. Garrity, Jr. (born 1949), American lawyer and state legislator
- Shaenon K. Garrity (born 1978), webcomics writer and artist, creator of Narbonic
- Stacy Garrity (born 1964), Pennsylvania state treasurer
- Terry Garrity (1940–2022), American author, also known as "J" (for "Joan"), author of The Sensuous Woman
- Thomas A. Garrity (born 1957), American mathematician
- Wendell Arthur Garrity Jr. (1920–1999), former U.S. District Judge in Massachusetts

== See also ==
- Garrity Creek, 3 mile creek in Richmond, California's Hilltop neighborhood
- Friends of Garrity Creek (FGC) is a political organization promoting the preservation of Garrity Creek
- Garrity warning, advisement of rights usually by U.S. federal agents to federal employees and contractors in internal investigations
- "Mr. Garrity and the Graves", episode of the American television series The Twilight Zone
- Garrity v. New Jersey, 385 U.S. 493 (1967), was a case concerning the right of public employees to be free from compulsory self-incrimination
- McGarrity, surname page
