= Champy =

Champy can refer to:

- Champ (folklore), reputed lake monster living in Lake Champlain
- Champagne (wine), a sparkling wine
- James A. Champy, one of the founders of the management theory behind Business process reengineering (BPR)
