= Reengineering =

Reengineering can refer to:

- Troubleshooting
- Business process reengineering
- Reengineering (software)

== See also ==
- Reverse engineering
