= Jack Waldron (actor) =

American actor and comedian (1893–1969)

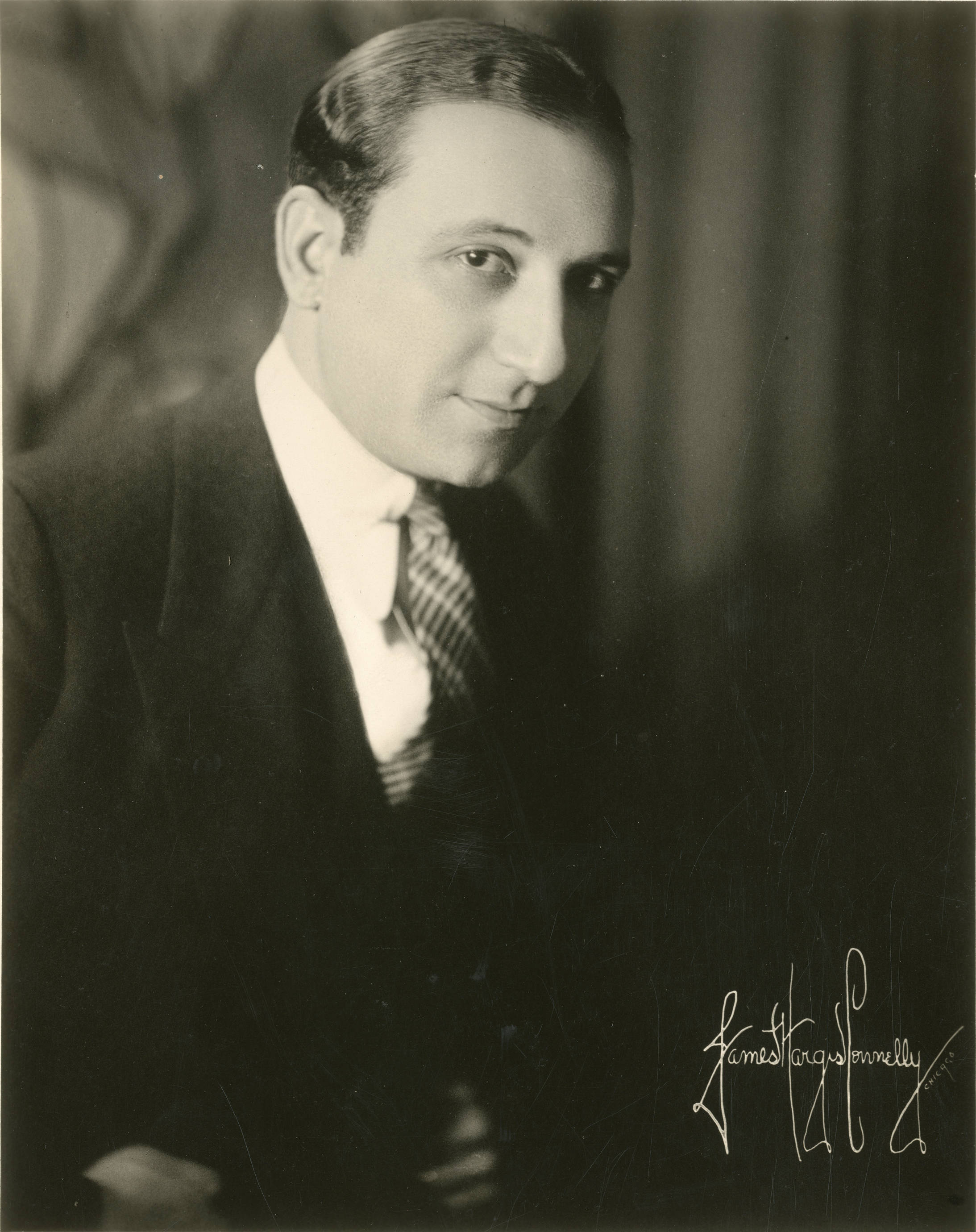
- Waldron in 1928
- Born: Jack Kestenbaum; February 3, 1893; Brooklyn, New York, U.S.
- Died: November 21, 1969 (aged 76); New York City, U.S.
- Occupations: Actor, Comedian, Shepherd of The Lambs
- Years active: 1920s–1950s
- Spouse: Harriett Fowler Waldron

Jack Waldron (born Jack Kestenbaum; February 3, 1893 – November 21, 1969) was an American actor-comedian, singer and dancer.

== Early life ==
As a boy, his two passions were baseball and the theatre, and he began his career as a dancer in vaudeville. During the Meuse–Argonne offensive in World War I, he entertained the troops as a member of the "Argonne Players".

== Career ==
After the war, he played in Chicago nightclubs during the Prohibition years: the Chez Paris, Colosimo, the Paramount, and the Follies; he knew many of the racketeers of the period, including Al Capone. After the repeal of Prohibition, Waldron returned to New York to entertain in cafes.

On Broadway, he played the role of Tommy in Flossie (1924), an unspecified role in The Great Temptations (1926), one of the Boys of the Chorus in Hello Daddy! (1928–1929) and again in Woof Woof (1929–1930). In the 1950s, he played Mike Spears in the revival of Pal Joey (1952–1953), a salesman in The Pajama Game (1954–1956), Myron H. Hubbard in The Vamp (1955), and Schatzie Harris in Say, Darling (1959).

Waldron in A Breath of Broadway (1928)

As a comedic actor, he was known for his short films for Vitaphone Varieties: A Breath of Broadway (#2691, September 5, 1928) and Radio and Relatives (December 30, 1938). He also played a bartender in a 1951 episode of Martin Kane, Private Eye.

== The Lambs ==
Waldron was elected to The Lambs in 1949 and was later made an Honorary Life member. He was elected to Council 1960-1969 and became Shepherd in 1969, six months before his death.

== Death ==
Waldron died of cardiac arrest, suddenly and quietly during the night on November 21, 1969, in the arms of his wife Harriet.
