= Megan Lawrence =

American actress (born 1972)

Megan Lawrence (born 1972) is an American actress best known for her roles on Broadway. Among other honors, she has been nominated for a Tony Award. She has also appeared Off-Broadway, in regional theatre and on television.

== Life and career ==
Lawrence grew up near Baltimore, Maryland. Her father was music professor at Towson University, and her mother taught lower school music. She attended Cincinnati Conservatory for a year and then returned to Baltimore to attend classes at Towson, work as a waitress and consider whether to begin a career in theatre. By the early 1990s, Lawrence began to perform in children's theatre and then adult musicals at a dinner theatre in Maryland.

At the Signature Theatre (Arlington, Virginia) in the 1990s, Lawrence played, among other roles, Marta in Company, Little Red Riding Hood in Into the Woods and Sally Bowles in Cabaret (1995), earning Helen Hayes Award nominations for all three roles and winning for Into the Woods for Outstanding Supporting Actress, Resident Musical. She played the daughter in Kander and Ebb's Over and Over in 1999.

She played Frenchy in a Grease national tour and made her Broadway debut as a replacement for various characters in the original Broadway production of Les Misérables, playing Eponine in 1998 and 1999. She was in the original Off-Broadway cast of Urinetown and returned to the show on Broadway as a replacement, eventually playing Little Sally in 2002 and 2003.

Other roles include Hillary Clinton in Monica! The Musical at the New York Musical Theatre Festival and a role in O. Henry's Lovers at the Goodspeed Playhouse in 2003. In 2005, she was in Two Gentlemen of Verona in the role of "Lucetta", produced by The Public Theater at the Delacorte Theater (New York City).

On television, she has appeared as Joyce on the TV soap opera One Life to Live.

Lawrence was nominated for the Tony Award for Best Featured Actress in a Musical for her portrayal of Gladys in the 2006 Broadway revival of The Pajama Game. She also played Mother and Buddahdalirama in the 2009 revival of Hair. She starred as Louise in Broadway's 2016 production of "Holiday Inn, The New Irving Berlin Musical", at Studio 54.

== Personal life ==
In 1999, she married actor and singer Kevin Kern.
