= The Pajama Game =

1954 musical by Richard Adler and Jerry Ross

- Original Broadway windowcard illustrated by Peter Arno
- Music: Richard Adler; Jerry Ross
- Lyrics: Richard Adler; Jerry Ross
- Book: George Abbott; Richard Bissell
- Basis: Novel 7½ Cents by Richard Bissell
- Premiere: May 13, 1954: St. James Theatre
- Productions: 1954 Broadway; 1955 West End; 1973 Broadway revival 2006 Broadway revival 2014 West End revival
- Awards: Tony Award for Best Musical; Tony Award for Best Revival

The Pajama Game is a musical based on the 1953 novel 7½ Cents by Richard Bissell. The book is by George Abbott and Richard Bissell; the music and lyrics are by Richard Adler and Jerry Ross. Dances were staged by Bob Fosse in his choreography debut. The story deals with labor troubles and romance in a pajama factory.

The original Broadway production opened on May 13, 1954, at the St. James Theatre, and ran for 1,063 performances, with a brief stop at the Shubert Theatre at the end of the run. It was revived in 1973, and again in 2006 by The Roundabout Theatre Company. The original production, produced by Frederick Brisson, Robert E. Griffith and Harold S. Prince, won a Tony Award for Best Musical. The 2006 Broadway revival won a Tony Award for Best Revival of a Musical. The musical is a popular choice for community and school group productions.

The original West End production opened at the London Coliseum on October 13, 1955, where it ran for 588 performances.

== Characters ==
- Sid Sorokin, the handsome new factory superintendent who falls in love with Babe, despite their being on opposite sides of the labor dispute central to the plot.
- Katherine "Babe" Williams, the leader of the Union Grievance Committee, who falls in love with Sid.
- Myron "Old Man" Hasler, the strict head of the pajama factory who keeps a secret.
- Gladys Hotchkiss, Hasler's attractive, quick-witted secretary, who dates Hines and is chased by Prez.
- Vernon Hines, the factory timekeeper, who thinks Gladys flirts too much and, as a result is always jealous.
- Prez, the head of the union and a skirt chaser, despite being a married man.
- Mabel, the mother hen of the factory and Sid's secretary.
- Mae, a loud-mouthed member of the Grievance Committee, who accepts Prez's advances, much to his surprise.
- Pop, Babe's kind and agreeable father.
- Max, a salesman.
- Charley, a worker in the factory and the handyman.
- Joe, a factory worker and Prez's right-hand man.
- Brenda, a member of the Grievance Committee.
- Virginia, a factory girl and union activist.
- Poopsie, a factory girl and union activist.
- Gus, an unhappy factory helper whom Sid shoves.

== Plot ==
Act I

Vernon Hines, the efficiency expert at the Sleep-Tite Pajama Factory in Cedar Rapids, Iowa, breaks the fourth wall to introduce the story ("The Pajama Game Opening"). Inside the factory, workers churn out pajamas at a backbreaking pace ("Racing with the Clock"). In the middle of this, Sid Sorokin has come from out of town to work in the factory as the new superintendent ("A New Town Is a Blue Town"). The union, led by Prez, is seeking a wage raise of seven-and-a-half cents an hour, though the company president, Myron Hasler, refuses to give way. Katherine "Babe" Williams is the leader of the Union Grievance Committee. Sid and Babe are in opposite camps, yet romantic interest is sparked at their first encounter. Despite cajoling from her fellow garment workers, Babe appears to reject Sid ("I'm Not At All in Love"). Meanwhile, Hines is in love with Gladys Hotchkiss, the company president's secretary, but is pushing her away with his jealous behavior. After witnessing a fight between the couple, Sid's secretary, Mabel, tries to help Hines break from his jealous ways ("I'll Never Be Jealous Again"). Meanwhile, Sid, rejected again by Babe, is forced to confide his feelings to a dictaphone ("Hey There").

During the annual company picnic, kicked off with the official Sleep-Tite Company Anthem ("Sleep-Tite"), Hines demonstrates his knife throwing act while intoxicated, almost striking Babe while attempting to knock an apple off her head. Prez chases after Gladys, who rejects his advances ("Her Is"). Babe warms up to Sid, and they turn the entire picnic into a celebratory dance ("Once a Year Day"). As the picnic-goers head home, Prez turns his attentions to Mae, who responds in the positive far more quickly and aggressively than he'd expected ("Her Is (Reprise)"). At Babe's home, Sid's romantic overtures are deflected by Babe, who makes casual conversation on tangential subjects ("Small Talk"). Eventually the walls come down between the two, who admit their love for one another ("There Once Was a Man"), but their estrangement is reinforced when they return to the factory. A slow-down is staged by the union, strongly supported by Babe ("Racing with the Clock (Reprise)"). Sid, as factory superintendent, demands an "honest day's work" and threatens to fire slackers. Babe, however, is still determined to fight for their cause, and intentionally jams the factory line, causing a breakdown, and Sid reluctantly fires her. As she leaves, he begins to wonder again whether a romance with her is a mistake ("Hey There (Reprise)").

Act II

At the Union meeting, after a rallying speech by Prez, Gladys (Mae in the 2006 revival) performs for the rest of the union, with "the boys from the cutting room floor" ("Steam Heat"). After the main meeting, the Grievance Committee meets at Babe's house, to discuss further tactics, such as mismatching sizes of pajamas and sewing the fly-buttons onto the bottoms such that they are likely to come off and leave their wearer pants-less. At the meeting, as Prez and Mae's relationship is waning, Sid arrives and tries to smooth things over with Babe. Despite her feelings for Sid, she pushes him away ("Hey There (Reprise)").

Back at the factory, the girls reassure Hines, who is personally offended by the slow down, that he is doing nothing wrong ("Think of the Time I Save"). Hasler has a meeting in his office with Max, one of the company's traveling salesmen, about an incident that occurred in Peoria, Illinois. Hines is called in to try on pajama pants, which fall down in front of everybody just as Gladys walks in. Believing that he is fooling around, she angrily dismisses him. Sid, now convinced that Babe's championship of the union is justified, takes Gladys out for the evening to a night club, Hernando's Hideaway ("Hernando's Hideaway"), where he wheedles the key to the company's books from her. Hines and Babe each discover the pair and assume they are becoming romantically involved. Babe storms out, and Hines believes his jealous imaginings have come true ("I'll Never Be Jealous Again Ballet").

Using Gladys' key, Sid accesses the firm's books and discovers that Hasler has already tacked on the extra seven and one-half cents to the production cost, but has kept all the extra profits for himself. Hines, still jealous out of his mind, has broken into Gladys' office, and flings knives past Sid and Gladys, narrowly missing an increasingly paranoid Mr. Hasler. After detaining Hines, Sid then brings about Hasler's consent to a pay raise and rushes to bring the news to the Union Rally, already in progress ("7½ Cents"). This news brings peace to the factory and to his love life, allowing him to reconnect with Babe ("There Once Was a Man (Reprise)"). Everyone goes out to celebrate at Hernando's Hideaway clothed in company brand pajamas ("The Pajama Game Finale").

== Musical numbers ==
Act I

- "The Pajama Game Opening" – Hines
- "Racing With the Clock" – Factory Workers
- "A New Town Is a Blue Town" – Sid
- "I'm Not At All in Love" – Babe and Factory Girls
- "I'll Never Be Jealous Again" – Mabel and Hines
- "Hey There" – Sid
- "Racing With the Clock" (Reprise) – Factory Workers
- "Sleep-Tite" – Company
- "Her Is" – Prez and Gladys
- "Once a Year Day" – Sid, Babe, and Company
- "Her Is" (Reprise) – Prez and Mae
- "Small Talk" – Sid and Babe
- "There Once Was a Man" – Sid and Babe
- "Hey There" (Reprise) – Sid

Act II

- "Steam Heat" – Gladys (Mae in 2006) and the Box Boys
- "The World Around Us" (added to 2006 production) – Sid
- "Hey There" (Reprise) – Babe
- "If You Win, You Lose" (added to 2006 production) – Sid and Babe
- "Think of the Time I Save" – Hines and Factory Girls
- "Hernando's Hideaway" – Gladys and Company
- "The Three of Us (Me, Myself and I)" (added to 2006 production) – Hines and Gladys
- "7½ Cents" – Prez, Babe and Factory Workers
- "There Once Was a Man" (Reprise) – Sid and Babe
- "The Pajama Game Finale" – Full Company

=== Notes on the music ===
Two of the songs, "There Once Was a Man" and "A New Town Is a Blue Town", were actually written by Frank Loesser, although they were uncredited.

==== "Hernando's Hideaway" ====
For the 2006 revival, Harry Connick Jr. played the piano, when Gladys (Megan Lawrence), Sid, and Company were on stage for "Hernando's Hideaway". "The length and form of the song remain steady", Kathleen Marshall said, "but he can improvise within it."

==== "Steam Heat" ====
In the original production, and in the film version, the famed dance number "Steam Heat" was danced by Gladys. In the 2006 revival, the number was made with Mae (Joyce Chittick), instead of Gladys. Kathleen Marshall explains: "Hines accuses Gladys of being a flirt, and she's not. So does it make sense that she'd go and strut her stuff in front of the whole union? Hines would say, 'Aha, you floozy, I caught you!' Also, she's the boss's secretary, so why would she be at a union meeting? I think it's much more fun that Gladys doesn't really let go until she goes out with Sid, gets real drunk, and throws caution to the wind."

==== New songs for the 2006 revival ====
===== "The Three of Us (Me, Myself and I)" =====
Words and music by Richard Adler; in 2006, Hines (Michael McKean) performed the new number, "The Three of Us" at show's end with Gladys (Megan Lawrence). At the time of the revival, Adler was quoted as saying that he wrote the song for Jimmy Durante in 1964. "It was written for Jimmy Durante", says McKean, "and Durante used to do it in his act, but he never recorded it, so it's kind of an orphan." The song was actually featured in the 1966 television musical, Olympus 7-000, part of the ABC Stage 67 series which also produced Stephen Sondheim's Evening Primrose. Eddie Foy Jr. (who had played Hines in the original Broadway and movie versions of The Pajama Game) introduced the song in Olympus 7-000 and sings it on the Command Records soundtrack album. Donald O'Connor, Larry Blyden and Phyllis Newman co-starred in the TV special with Foy.

===== "The World Around Us" =====
"The World Around Us" was part of the 1954 Broadway previews and opening, but was dropped during the first week of the Broadway run, replaced by Babe's reprise of "Hey There". This would leave Sid with no songs in the second act, aside from the reprise of "There Once was a Man". The number was restored for the 2006 Broadway revival, allowing star Harry Connick Jr. to have a second-act song.

===== "If You Win, You Lose" =====
Words and music by Richard Adler; for the 1973 revival, in place of the second-act "Hey There" reprise, there was a new song, "Watch Your Heart". Retitled "If You Win, You Lose", the song has been included in recent productions of the show and was in the 2006 Broadway production.

== Casts (1950s-1970s) ==
Character	Original Broadway Production	US National Tour	Original West End Production	City Center Revival	The Muny Production	Pittsburgh Civic Light Opera Production	Film Version	Pittsburgh Civic Light Opera Production	Music Fair Circuit Production	The Muny Production	Music Fair Circuit Production	The Muny Production	US Regional Tour	Broadway Revival
Character	1954-1956	1955-1957		1957				1960	1961	1962	1966	1968	1973	1973-1974
Sid Sorokin	John Raitt	Larry Douglas	Edmund Hockridge	Larry Douglas	Bob Carroll	John Raitt	John Raitt	Julius La Rosa	Walter Farrell	Stephen Douglass	Stanley Grover	John Raitt	John McCook	Hal Linden
Babe Williams	Janis Paige	Fran Warren	Joy Nichols	Jane Kean	Mindy Carson	Patricia Marand	Doris Day	?	Julia Meade	Dolores Gray	Liza Minnelli	Jaye P. Morgan	Juliet Prowse	Barbara McNair
Vernon Hines	Eddie Foy Jr.	Buster West	Max Wall	Paul Hartman	Eddie Foy Jr.	—N/a	Eddie Foy Jr.	Jack Goode	Sammy Smith	Jack Goode	Bernie West	Jack Goode	Danny Meehan	Cab Calloway
Gladys	Carol Haney	Pat Stanley	Elizabeth Seal	Pat Stanley	Dorothy Love	Neile Adams	Carol Haney	Ellen Ray	Judy Guyll	Helen Gallagher	Luba Lisa	Patti Karr	Barbara Erwin	Sharron Miller
Prez	Stanley Prager	Jack Straw	Frank Lawless	Stanley Prager	Benny Baker	?	Jack Straw	Jack Naughton	Sid Raymond	Zale Kessler	Sid Raymond	Kenneth McMillan	Danny Carroll	Marc Jordan
Mae	Thelma Pelish	Tally Brown	Jessie Robins	Thelma Pelish	Thelma Pelish	?	Thelma Pelish	Tally Brown	Thelma Pelish	Tally Brown	Thelma Pelish	Pat Hartman Bock	Carol Trigg	Margret Coleman
Mabel	Reta Shaw	Marguerite Shaw	Joan Emney	Marguerite Shaw	Marguerite Shaw	Justine Johnston	Reta Shaw	?	Justine Johnston	Marguerite Shaw	Ruth Gillette	Marguerite Shaw	Travis Hudson	Mary Jo Catlett
Hasler	Ralph Dunn	Fred Irving Lewis	Felix Felton	Ralph W. Chambers	Ralph Dunn	—N/a	Ralph Dunn	—N/a	T. J. Halligan	Humphrey Davies	Eddie Bruce	James Paul	Lawrence Vincent	Willard Waterman
Pop	William David	Franklyn Fox	Charles Rolfe	William David	Dave Mallen	—N/a	Franklyn Fox	—N/a	Sam Kressen	Edmund Lyndeck	Charles White	Truman Gaige	Charles Schulte	Baron Wilson
Poopsie	Rae Allen	Barrie Croft	Susan Irvin	Chele Graham	Jackie McElroy	Josephine Chase	Barbara Nichols	—N/a	Jane Herstelle	Carole Lintzenich	Diana Finn	Sherry Gore	Chris Carlson	Wyetta Turner
Charlie	Ralph Chambers	Bobby Vail	Stanley Beadle	Eugene Wood	Nolan Van Way	John Clavin	Ralph Chambers	—N/a	Sam Stoneburner	David MacLaren	William Black	Joseph Roberts	Dennis Stewart	Tiger Haynes
Brenda	Marion Colby	Mary Stanton	Olga Lowe	Ann Buckles	Alberta Hopkins	—N/a	Mary Stanton	—N/a	Joan Trona	Kelly Stephens	Lynda Wells	Patty Kay Booth	Suzie Swanson	Chris Calloway

=== Notable Replacements ===
==== Original Broadway Production (1954–1956) ====
- Sid Sorokin: Stephen Douglass
- Babe Williams: Julie Wilson, Fran Warren, Patricia Marand
- Vernon Hines: Buster West, Paul Hartman, Stanley Prager (u/s)
- Gladys: Helen Gallagher, Neile Adams, Shirley MacLaine (u/s)
- Mabel: Ruth Gillette

==== US National Tour (1955–1957) ====
- Gladys: Barbara Bostock
- Mabel: Ruth Gillette

==== Broadway Revival (1973-1974) ====
- Vernon Hines: Tiger Haynes (s/b)

== Casts (1980s-2020s) ==
Character	US Regional Tour	Leicester Haymarket Theatre Production	New York City Opera Production	California Music Theatre Production	Jay Records Studio Cast Recording	Goodspeed Musicals Production	Reprise Theatre Company Production	West End Revival	Pittsburgh Civic Light Opera Production	Encores! Production	Broadway Revival	The Muny Production	Chichester Festival Theatre Production	West End Revival	Arena Stage Production
Character	1981	1985–1986	1989		1996	1998		1999	2000	2002	2006	2007	2013	2014	2017
Sid Sorokin	John Raitt	Paul Jones	Richard Muenz	Keith Rice	Ron Raines	Sean McDermott	Dorian Harewood	Graham Bickley	?	Brent Barrett	Harry Connick Jr.	Will Chase	Hadley Fraser	Michael Xavier	Tim Rogan
Babe Williams	Diane J. Findlay	Fiona Hendley	Judy Kaye	Lisa Robinson	Judy Kaye	Colleen Fitzpatrick	Christine Ebersole	Leslie Ash	Beth Leavel	Karen Ziemba	Kelli O'Hara	Kate Baldwin	Joanna Riding	Joanna Riding	Britney Coleman
Vernon Hines	Robert Fitch	Harry Dickman	Avery Saltzman	Pat Harrington Jr.	Avery Saltzman	Bob Walton	Peter Scolari	John Hegley	?	Mark Linn-Baker	Michael McKean	Bruce Adler	Gary Wilmot	Peter Polycarpou	Eddie Korbich
Gladys	Margery Beddow	Rachel Izen	Lenora Nemetz	Patti Colombo	Kim Criswell	Valerie Wright	Christina Saffran Ashford	Alison Thérèse Limerick	Jane Lanier	Deidre Goodwin	Megan Lawrence	Leslie Denniston	Alexis Owen Hobbs	Alexis Owen Hobbs	Nancy Anderson
Prez	Stan Rubin	Robert Oates	David Green	Don Bovingloh	David Green	Casey Nicholaw	Bob Amaral	Jonathan D. Ellis	Jeffrey Howell	Daniel Jenkins	Peter Benson	Joe Farrell	Eugene McCoy	Eugene McCoy	Blakely Slaybaugh
Mae	Lulu Downs	Wendy Schoemann	Susan Nicely	Bonnie Hellman	—N/a	Lynn Eldredge	Mary Gallipoli	Louise Davidson	Patricia Phillips	Katie Harvey	Joyce Chittick	Ruth Pferdehirt	Jenny Boyd	Jennie Dale	Gabi Stapula
Mabel	Fran Stevens	Pip Hinton	Brooks Almy	Mary Jo Catlett	Brooks Almy	Nora Mae Lyng	Brooks Almy	Anita Dobson	Georgia Engel	Gina Ferrall	Roz Ryan	Patti Mariano	Claire Machin	Claire Machin	Donna McKechnie
Hasler	Irwin Charone	Peter Schofield	Steve Pudenz	Jack Ritschel	Theodore Pappas	David Coffee	Kenneth Kimmins	John Levitt	Gene A. Saraceni	Ken Page	Richard Poe	John Freimann	Colin Stinton	Colin Stinton	Edward Gero
Pop	Lee H. Doyle	John Bott	William Ledbetter	Dan Stroud	—N/a	Chet Carlin	?	Nick Hamilton	?	Fred Burrell	Michael McCormick	John Contini	Colin Stinton	Colin Stinton	Elliot Dash
Poopsie	Jane Ann Sargia	Andrée Bernard	Lillian Graff	Sherri Bannister	—N/a	Penny Ayn Maas	Jill Matson	Karen Clegg	?	Jennifer Cody	Jennifer Cody	Jennifer Cody	Landi Oshinowo	Sharon Wattis	?
Charlie	Jean-Paul Richard	Ian Dring	—N/a	Brian Galatto	—N/a	Brian O'Brien	—N/a	Rufus Dean	Dana Steer	J.D. Webster	Stephen Berger	Rich Pisarkiewicz	Carl Sanderson	Nolan Frederick	—N/a
Brenda	Ginger Williams	Francesca Whitburn	Joyce Campana	Karole Foreman	—N/a	?	Palmer Davis	Deborah Spellman	Lisa McMillan	Angela Robinson	Paula Leggett Chase	Sara Sheperd	Sophia Nomvete	Keisha Amponsa Banson	—N/a

=== Notable Replacements ===
==== New York City Opera Production (1989) ====
- Sid Sorokin: Mark Jacoby (s/b)
- Gladys: Karen Ziemba (s/b)

==== Broadway Revival (2006) ====
- Vernon Hines: Michael McCormick (u/s)
- Gladys: Jennifer Cody (u/s)

== Production history ==
=== Original Broadway ===
The original Broadway production opened at the St. James Theatre on May 13, 1954, and closed on November 24, 1956, after 1,063 performances. It was directed by George Abbott and Jerome Robbins and was the first Broadway show to feature the choreography of Bob Fosse. The production's scenic designer and costume designer was Lemuel Ayers. The original cast included Eddie Foy Jr. (Hines), Stanley Prager (Prez), Gordon Woodbrun (Joe), Ralph Dunn (Hasler), Carol Haney (Gladys), John Raitt (Sid Sorokin), Reta Shaw (Mabel), Buzz Miller (Second Helper), Janis Paige (Babe Williams), Rae Allen (Poopsie) and Jack Waldron (Salesman).

This production is also noted for jump-starting the career of Shirley MacLaine. An unknown 20-year-old at the time, she was selected to understudy Carol Haney's role. Starting in late May 1954, MacLaine filled the role while Haney was out of commission with an injured ankle. Director/producer Hal B. Wallis was an audience member at one of MacLaine's performances, and signed her as a contract player for Paramount Pictures. The production received the Tony Award for Best Musical, and Carol Haney's performance and Bob Fosse's choreography were also honored.

=== Original London ===
The Pajama Game opened at the London Coliseum on 13 October 1955 and ran for 588 performances – an undoubted hit. Edmund Hockridge played Sid Sorokin and Joy Nichols played Babe Williams. Max Wall, in a rare outing to the musical stage, played Hines, Elizabeth Seal, who later found stardom playing the lead role in Irma La Douce, played Gladys, and Frank Lawless played Prez.

=== Original Australia and New Zealand ===
The original Australian production presented by J.C. Williamson commenced at Her Majesty's Theatre, Melbourne on February 2, 1957.

The cast was led by Toni Lamond as Babe Williams and William Newman as Sid Sorokin, with Keith Petersen as Hines, Jill Perryman as Mabel, Don Richards as Prez and Tikki Taylor as Gladys.

It subsequently toured to Sydney's Empire Theatre, commencing June 12, 1957, followed by Her Majesty's Theatre, Brisbane from November 12, 1957. The show then made a return engagement to Her Majesty's Theatre, Melbourne, commencing Boxing Day, December 26, 1957.

The production continued touring through 1958, first to His Majesty's Theatre, Perth from May 3, 1958, then to Theatre Royal, Adelaide from June 18, 1958.

After its Australian season, the tour commenced its New Zealand season on February 10, 1958 at His Majesty's Theatre, Auckland, followed by the Grand Opera House, Wellington, from March 12, 1958, where it concluded its run.

=== Film, 1957 ===
The film version was released by Warner Bros. in 1957 and featured the original stage cast except for Janis Paige, whose role is played by Doris Day, and Stanley Prager, whose role is played by Jack Straw.

=== Broadway revival, 1973 ===
A Broadway revival opened on December 9, 1973, at the Lunt-Fontanne Theatre, but it closed on February 3, 1974, after just 65 performances. It was directed by George Abbott, one of the two directors of the original production in 1954, with choreography by Zoya Leporska. The cast included Hal Linden, Barbara McNair, and Cab Calloway as Hines.

=== West End, 1999 ===
A West End revival arrived at the Victoria Palace Theatre in October 1999 having originated at Birmingham Rep and transferred to the Victoria Palace via Toronto. Directed by Simon Callow, it briefly starred Ulrika Johnson as Babe (Birmingham Rep), but she left the production when it travelled to Toronto where Babe was played by Camilla Scott, then in London, Leslie Ashe. Sid Sorokin was played by Graham Bickley throughout, earning himself a Dora Award nomination for 'Outstanding Performance by a male in a Principal Role' in Toronto. It also starred John Hegley and Anita Dobson with choreography by David Bintley. It closed on 18 December 1999.

=== Broadway, 2006 ===
The Roundabout Theatre Company revival, produced by special arrangement with Jeffrey Richards, James Fuld Jr. and Scott Landis, opened on February 23, 2006 and closed on June 17, 2006, after 129 performances (and 41 previews). Kathleen Marshall was choreographer and director, with a cast starring Harry Connick Jr., making his Broadway acting debut as Sid, Kelli O'Hara as Babe, Michael McKean as Hines, Roz Ryan as Mabel, and Megan Lawrence as Gladys. The revival included three added songs by Richard Adler. The original book by George Abbott and Richard Bissell was revised by Peter Ackerman. This revival cast made a recording that was included in full on the two-part album Harry on Broadway, Act I with Connick Jr. and O'Hara recording a second set of selections from the 2001 musical Thou Shalt Not.

=== Chichester Festival Theatre and West End, 2013/2014 ===
Directed by Richard Eyre, the UK 2013 revival of The Pajama Game opened on April 22 at Chichester Festival Theatre's Minerva Theatre and the cast included television personality Gary Wilmot. The production's sold-out run at Chichester ended on 8 June 2013, and on 1 May 2014 it transferred to the West End's Shaftesbury Theatre. The West End transfer received positive reviews from a number of national media outlets. The production ran for a limited season at the Shaftesbury Theatre, closing on 13 September 2014.

== Awards and nominations ==
=== Original Broadway production ===
Year	Award Ceremony	Category	Nominee	Result
1955	Tony Award	Best Musical		Won
1955	Tony Award	Best Performance by a Featured Actress in a Musical	Carol Haney	Won
1955	Tony Award	Best Choreography	Bob Fosse	Won

=== 2006 Broadway revival ===
Year	Award Ceremony	Category	Nominee	Result
2006	Tony Award	Best Revival of a Musical		Won
2006	Tony Award	Best Performance by a Leading Actor in a Musical	Harry Connick Jr.	Nominated
2006	Tony Award	Best Performance by a Leading Actress in a Musical	Kelli O'Hara	Nominated
2006	Tony Award	Best Performance by a Featured Actress in a Musical	Megan Lawrence	Nominated
2006	Tony Award	Best Direction of a Musical	Kathleen Marshall	Nominated
2006	Tony Award	Best Choreography	Kathleen Marshall	Won
2006	Tony Award	Best Orchestrations	Dick Lieb and Danny Troob	Nominated
2006	Tony Award	Best Scenic Design	Derek McLane	Nominated
2006	Tony Award	Best Costume Design	Martin Pakledinaz	Nominated
2006	Drama Desk Award	Outstanding Revival of a Musical		Nominated
2006	Drama Desk Award	Outstanding Actor in a Musical	Harry Connick Jr.	Nominated
2006	Drama Desk Award	Outstanding Actress in a Musical	Kelli O'Hara	Nominated
2006	Drama Desk Award	Outstanding Director of a Musical	Kathleen Marshall	Nominated
2006	Drama Desk Award	Outstanding Choreography	Kathleen Marshall	Won
2006	Drama Desk Award	Outstanding Orchestrations	Danny Troob and Dick Lieb	Nominated
2006	Drama Desk Award	Outstanding Sound Design	Brian Ronan	Nominated
2006	Outer Critics Circle Award	Outstanding Revival of a Musical		Nominated
2006	Outer Critics Circle Award	Outstanding Actor in a Musical	Harry Connick Jr.	Nominated
2006	Outer Critics Circle Award	Outstanding Actress in a Musical	Kelli O'Hara	Nominated
2006	Outer Critics Circle Award	Outstanding Featured Actor in a Musical	Peter Benson	Nominated
2006	Outer Critics Circle Award	Outstanding Featured Actress in a Musical	Megan Lawrence	Nominated
2006	Outer Critics Circle Award	Outstanding Direction of a Musical	Kathleen Marshall	Nominated
2006	Outer Critics Circle Award	Outstanding Choreography	Kathleen Marshall	Won
2006	Outer Critics Circle Award	Outstanding Costume Design	Martin Pakledinaz	Nominated
2006	Theatre World Award		Harry Connick Jr.	Won
2007	Grammy Award	Best Musical Show Album		Nominated

== Recordings ==
- The 1954 cast recording, originally issued by Columbia Records and currently available on Sony Masterworks.
- The 1957 film soundtrack recording, originally issued by Columbia Records and currently available on Collectables Records.
- An EP of the Australian cast was recorded during the New Zealand leg of the tour. The track list included "The Pajama Game", "Her Is", "Hey There", "I'll Never Be Jealous Again", and "7 1/2 Cents".
- The cast recording for the 2006 revival is a two-disc set: The first disc contains the Broadway cast recording from The Pajama Game; and as a suggestion from the Sony record company, there is a second disc, which contains new recordings of songs from Harry Connick, Jr.'s, compositions for the 2001 musical Thou Shalt Not, performed by Harry Connick Jr., and Kelli O'Hara. The double album is produced by Tracey Freeman and Harry Connick Jr.
