= Finding Neverland (musical) =

2012 musical by Barlow and Kennedy

- Broadway Playbill cover
- Music: Scott Frankel (Leicester production); Gary Barlow (Revised edition); Eliot Kennedy (Revised edition)
- Lyrics: Michael Korie (Leicester production); Gary Barlow (Revised edition); Elliott Kennedy (Revised edition)
- Book: Allan Knee (Leicester production); James Graham (Revised edition)
- Basis: The Man Who Was Peter Pan by Allan Knee and Finding Neverland by David Magee
- Productions: 2012 Leicester; 2014 Cambridge; 2015 Broadway; 2016 US Tour

Finding Neverland is a musical with music and lyrics by Gary Barlow and Eliot Kennedy and a book by James Graham adapted from the 1998 play The Man Who Was Peter Pan by Allan Knee and its 2004 film version Finding Neverland. An early version of the musical made its world premiere at the Curve Theatre in Leicester in 2012 with a book by Allan Knee, music by Scott Frankel and lyrics by Michael Korie. A reworked version with the current writing team made its world premiere in 2014 at the American Repertory Theater in Cambridge, Massachusetts. Following completion of its Cambridge run, the production transferred to Broadway in March 2015.

After a 17-month Broadway run, Finding Neverland closed on 21 August 2016, and began a U.S. national tour the following month.

== Background ==
On 6 February 2011, La Jolla Playhouse, California, announced that they would produce a new stage musical based on the film with the book by Allan Knee, score by Scott Frankel (music) and Michael Korie (lyrics), and directed and choreographed by Rob Ashford. A planned production at La Jolla Playhouse was not held. A developmental reading was held in New York on 31 March 2011, with Julian Ovenden, Kelli O'Hara, Tony Roberts, Mary Beth Peil, Michael Cumpsty, and Meredith Patterson, directed by Ashford. The adaptation had its world premiere on 22 September 2012 at Curve in Leicester. Directed by Rob Ashford, it starred Julian Ovenden as J.M Barrie and West End actress Rosalie Craig as Sylvia Llewelyn Davies.

On 4 September 2013, it was announced that producer Harvey Weinstein had hired Barry Weissler as executive producer. They planned on opening a revised version of the musical at the American Repertory Theater (ART), Cambridge, Massachusetts in 2014. The revised musical had a new creative team, with Diane Paulus as director, a new book by James Graham, and 22 songs by Gary Barlow and Eliot Kennedy, with a few songs from the original composers. A private reading was held in September 2013 with Brian d’Arcy James as Barrie and Jason Alexander as the "nagging theater producer". On 27 February 2014, a further developmental workshop was announced for March with Matthew Morrison as Barrie.

== Productions ==
=== Cambridge, Massachusetts (2014) ===
The revised production ran at the ART from 23 July 2014 to 28 September 2014, with songs by six-time Ivor Novello Award winner Gary Barlow and Eliot Kennedy, the book by James Graham and choreography by Mia Michaels; ART artistic director Diane Paulus is the director. The full cast and creative team was announced on 2 June 2014, with Jeremy Jordan as Barrie and Laura Michelle Kelly as Sylvia Llewelyn Davies featured. The cast also includes Michael McGrath as Charles Frohman/Captain Hook, Carolee Carmello as Madame du Maurier, Jeanna de Waal as Mary Barrie, Aidan Gemme as Peter, Alex Dreier as Michael, Sawyer Nunes as George and Hayden Signoretti as Jack. Roger Bart who was originally announced for the character of Charles Frohman was replaced by Michael McGrath.

Jennifer Hudson debuted the song "Neverland", from the musical, at the 68th Tony Awards on 8 June 2014.

=== Broadway (2015-16) ===
The ART production directed by Diane Paulus moved to Broadway at the Lunt-Fontanne Theatre in March 2015. On 10 November 2014, it was announced that Matthew Morrison would take Jordan's place in the portrayal of J. M. Barrie in the Broadway production. Kelsey Grammer starred as Charles Frohman and Laura Michelle Kelly reprised the role of Sylvia Llewelyn Davies. Previews began 15 March 2015, with the official opening on 15 April. The production did not receive any Tony Award nominations. The Broadway production closed on 21 August 2016 after 565 performances. In 2017, as an offshoot of investigations into and reporting about Weinstein's many sexual abuse allegations, several news sources also reported that a significant amount of money that Weinstein ostensibly raised for the AIDS charity amfAR was instead allegedly funneled into the American Repertory Theater and the production budget for Finding Neverland.

=== US national tour (2016-17) ===
The US national tour began in Buffalo, New York on 7 October 2016, prior to the official opening on 11 October. The tour was directed by Diane Paulus and featured Kevin Kern as J.M. Barrie, Christine Dwyer as Sylvia Llewelyn Davies, Tom Hewitt as Frohman/Hook, Crystal Kellogg, Joanna Glushak, Jordan Cole, Finn Faulconer, Tyler Patrick Hennessy, Ben Krieger, Eli Tokash and Mitchell Wray. John Davidson replaced Hewitt in June 2017.

=== Planned London production ===
In early 2016 it was announced that Finding Neverland would open in London in 2017, starring Alfie Boe as J.M. Barrie. The rest of the cast was not announced at the time. On 15 May 2016, Gary Barlow performed the song "Something About This Night" from the musical for the Queen's 90th birthday celebration, hosted by Ant & Dec. Guest starring was Katherine Jenkins and Dame Shirley Bassey.

== Characters ==
- James Matthew Barrie: The creator of Peter Pan, a Scottish playwright who still has a child inside of him.
- Sylvia Llewelyn Davies: a widow with four children whose family inspires Barrie to write Peter Pan.
- Mary Barrie: James' unhappy wife.
- Mrs. du Maurier: Sylvia's strict mother who despises Barrie.
- Charles Frohman: Barrie's friend and the director/producer of the Acting Company that Barrie writes for.
- Captain James Hook: The classic villain from Peter Pan, comes to Barrie in a vision to convince him to add a villain to his show. Played by the same actor as Frohman.
- Peter Llewelyn Davies: One of Sylvia's sons. Loves reading and develops a strong relationship with Barrie.
- Michael Llewelyn Davies: One of Sylvia's sons.
- Jack Llewelyn Davies: One of Sylvia's sons.
- George Llewelyn Davies: One of Sylvia's sons.
- Lord Canaan: A wealthy and pompous man who Frohman tries to get as a fellow producer for the play, ends up with Mary.
- Mr. Cromer: A grumpy yet lovable member of the acting troupe. Plays Michael in Peter Pan.
- Mr. Henshaw: A vain yet friendly member of the acting troupe. Plays Nana in Peter Pan.
- Elliott: Frohman's eager assistant.
- Miss Basset: A member of the acting troupe. Plays Nibs in Peter Pan.
- Miss Jones: A member of the acting troupe. Plays Tootles in Peter Pan.
- Mr. Turpin: A member of the acting troupe. Plays Captain Hook in Peter Pan.
- Peter Pan: The titular character of the play, takes Sylvia to Neverland towards the end of the show.
- Wendy (Acting Troupe): The eldest Darling child in the show within a show.
- Albert: Mary's butler.
- Emily: Mary's head maid.
- Porthos: Barrie's dog.
- The Acting Troupe, Servants, Londoners, Pirates, Indians, Lost Boys

== Casts ==
Note: Below are the principal casts of all professional major productions. some roles are portrayed by the same actors.

Role	Original Leicester Cast	Original A.R.T. Cast	Original Broadway Cast	U.S. National Tour Cast
Role	2012	2014	2015	2016
J. M. Barrie	Julian Ovenden	Jeremy Jordan	Matthew Morrison	Kevin Kern
Sylvia Llewelyn Davies	Rosalie Craig	Laura Michelle Kelly	Laura Michelle Kelly	Christine Dwyer
Charles Frohman Captain James Hook	Oliver Boot	Michael McGrath	Kelsey Grammer	Tom Hewitt
Mary Barrie	Clare Foster	Jeanna de Waal	Teal Wicks	Crystal Kellogg
Mrs. du Maurier	Liz Robertson	Carolee Carmello	Carolee Carmello	Joanna Glushak
Michael Llewelyn Davies	Worrall Courtney Jon Joe Flynn Morgan Heath Jamieson Hughes	Alex Dreier	Alex Dreier Hayden Signoretti Noah Hinsdale	Jordan Cole Mitchell Wray Tyler Patrick Hennessy
Jack Llewelyn Davies	Connor Fitzgerald Harrisson Slater Garrett Tennant	Hayden Signoretti	Hayden Signoretti Christopher Paul Richards Alex Dreier	Mitchell Wray Eli Tokash Tyler Patrick Hennessy
George Llewelyn Davies	Connor Phillips Josh Swinney Corey Wickenden	Sawyer Nunes	Sawyer Nunes Jackson Demott Hill Christopher Paul Richards	Finn Faulconer Ben Krieger Eli Tokash
Peter Llewelyn Davies	Theo Fewell Luke James Harry Folden	Aidan Gemme	Aidan Gemme Jackson Demott Hill Christopher Paul Richards	Ben Krieger Mitchell Wray Eli Tokash

=== Notes ===
- In the Leicester production, Lord Cannan was called Lord Griffin and Charles Blount was called Maximilian Blunt. Cut characters include PG Wodehouse (Norman Bowman), Mermaid (Ashley Hale), Scheherazade (Frankie Jenna), Mother (Julia Jupp), Arthur Conan Doyle (Martin Ledwith), Sally (Zoe Rainey), GK Chesterton (Gary Watson), Jerome K. Jerome (Stephen Webb), and David (James Scudamore).

=== Notable Broadway replacements ===
- Charles Frohman/Captain Hook: Anthony Warlow, Terrence Mann, Marc Kudisch
- J.M. Barrie: Tony Yazbeck, Alfie Boe, Kevin Kern (u/s)
- Mrs. du Maurier: Sandy Duncan, Sally Ann Triplett

== Musical numbers ==
=== Cambridge ===
Act I

- "Anywhere But Here" – J. M. Barrie
- "Better" – Charles Frohman, J. M. Barrie and the Acting Troupe
- "Rearranging the Furniture" – Mary Barrie
- "Believe" – J. M. Barrie, Sylvia Llewelyn Davies, Boys and Ensemble
- "All That Matters" – Sylvia and Mrs. du Maurier
- "We Own the Night (The Dinner Party)" – Mary, Mrs. du Maurier, Lord Cannan, Frohman, Sylvia, J. M. Barrie, Boys, Ensemble
- "Sylvia's Lullaby" – Sylvia
- "Neverland" – J. M. Barrie
- "Circus of Your Mind" – Frohman, Mary, Mrs. du Maurier and Ensemble
- "Hook" – Captain Hook, Barrie, Pirates
- "Stronger" – J. M. Barrie, Captain Hook, Pirates, and Ensemble

Act II

- "The World is Upside Down" – J. M. Barrie, Frohman and the Acting Troupe
- "Play" – Frohman, Sylvia and the Acting Troupe
- "What You Mean to Me" – J. M. Barrie and Sylvia
- "We're All Made of Stars" – the Llewelyn Davies Boys
- "When Your Feet Don't Touch the Ground" – J. M. Barrie and Peter
- "Something About This Night" – Mr. Cromer, Miss Potter, Mr. Turpin, Elliot, Frohman, JM Barrie, Peter, Ensemble
- "Neverland" (Reprise) – J. M. Barrie, Sylvia, Mrs. du Maurier, Boys and the Acting Troupe
- "Finale (All That Matters)" – Mrs. du Maurier, J. M. Barrie, Boys, Company

=== Broadway ===
Act I

- "If the World Turned Upside Down" – J. M. Barrie
- "All of London is Here Tonight" – Charles Frohman, J. M. Barrie, Mary and Company
- "The Pirates of Kensington" – George, Jack, Michael and Peter
- "Believe" – J. M. Barrie, Sylvia Llewelyn Davies, Boys and Ensemble
- "The Dinner Party" – Mary, Mrs. Du Maurier, Lord Cannan, Frohman, Barrie, Sylvia, Boys and Servants
- "We Own the Night" – Peter, Barrie, Sylvia, Boys, Ensemble
- "All That Matters" – Sylvia
- "The Pirates of Kensington" (Reprise) – George, Peter, Jack and Michael
- "Sylvia's Lullaby" – Sylvia Llewelyn Davies
- "Neverland" – J. M. Barrie and Sylvia
- "Circus of Your Mind" – Frohman, Mary, Mrs. du Maurier and Ensemble
- "Live by the Hook" – Captain Hook, Barrie and Pirates
- "Stronger" – J. M. Barrie, Captain Hook, Pirates and Ensemble

Act II

- "The World is Upside Down" – J. M. Barrie, Frohman and the Acting Troupe
- "What You Mean to Me" – J. M. Barrie and Sylvia
- "Play" – Frohman, Sylvia, Cromer, Henshaw, Miss Bassett, Turpin, Miss Jones, Elliott, Barrie, and the Acting Troupe
- "We're All Made of Stars" – the Llewelyn Davies Boys
- "When Your Feet Don't Touch the Ground" – J. M. Barrie and Peter
- "Something About This Night" – Frohman, Elliott, the Acting Troupe, J. M. Barrie and Peter
- "Neverland" (Reprise) – J. M. Barrie, Sylvia, Mrs. du Maurier, Boys and the Acting Troupe
- "Finale (When Your Feet Don't Touch the Ground)" – Mrs. du Maurier, J. M. Barrie and Ensemble

=== National Tour ===
Act I

- "Welcome to London" - Barrie, Ensemble
- "My Imagination" - J.M. Barrie
- "Believe" – J. M. Barrie, Sylvia Llewelyn Davies, Boys and Ensemble
- "The Dinner Party" – Mary, Mrs. Du Maurier, Lord Cannan, Frohman, Barrie, Sylvia, Boys and Servants
- "We Own the Night" – Mary, Mrs. du Maurier, Lord Cannan, Frohman, Sylvia, Barrie, Boys and Servants
- "All That Matters" – Sylvia
- "We Own the Night" (Reprise) – George, Peter, Jack and Michael
- "Sylvia's Lullaby" – Sylvia Llewelyn Davies
- "Neverland" – J. M. Barrie and Sylvia
- "Circus of Your Mind" (Part 1) - Charles Frohman
- "Circus of Your Mind" (Part 2) - Mary Barrie
- "Circus of Your Mind" (Part 3) - Mrs. du Maurier
- "Circus of Your Mind" (Part 4) – Frohman, Mary, Mrs. du Maurier and Ensemble
- "Stronger" (Part 1) – J. M. Barrie, Captain Hook and Ensemble
- "Live by the Hook" – Captain Hook, Barrie, Pirates and Ensemble
- "Stronger" (Part 2) – J. M. Barrie, Captain Hook, Pirates and Ensemble

Act II

- "The World is Upside Down" – J. M. Barrie, Frohman and the Acting Troupe
- "What You Mean to Me" – J. M. Barrie and Sylvia
- "Play" – Frohman, Sylvia, Cromer, Henshaw, Barrie, and the Acting Troupe
- "We're All Made of Stars" – the Llewelyn Davies Boys
- "When Your Feet Don't Touch the Ground" – J. M. Barrie and Peter
- "Something About This Night" (Part 1) – Frohman, the Acting Troupe, J. M. Barrie and Peter
- "Something About This Night" (Part 2) – Frohman, the Acting Troupe, J. M. Barrie and Peter
- "Neverland" (Reprise) – J. M. Barrie, Sylvia, Mrs. du Maurier, Boys and the Acting Troupe
- "Finale (Believe)" – Mrs. du Maurier, J. M. Barrie, Boys, and Ensemble

== Synopsis ==
The following synopsis is based on the Broadway version of the show.

=== Act 1 ===
The show opens with J.M. Barrie dressed in black with Peter Pan and Tinker Bell (represented by a light) on stage. Barrie is thinking out loud about his life. He also is finding clarity and accepting himself ("If the World Turned Upside Down").

Time winds back and James M. Barrie states that the story happens in London, 1903. We see a party hosted at Barrie’s house by his wife Mary and himself, after the opening night of his latest play The Wedding Guest. Charles Frohman, the show's producer, is attending the party. The party-goers say that it's the "best party of the year", however the play failed to please the audience. Lord Canaan, a wealthy and pompous man, is also attending the party and flirts with Mary ("All of London is Here Tonight").

A month later, Barrie meets Frohman at Kensington Garden and tells him that he is almost finished with his next play to substitute the failure that The Wedding Guest was. The Llewelyn Davies boys, Peter, Michael, Jack and George, play as pirates around the park and interact with Barrie, except Peter who sits and reads. Sylvia, their mother, tries to get them to behave, but fails, ultimately joining the play ("The Pirates of Kensington"). She meets Barrie and confesses that she did not enjoy his latest play as it felt that he recycled lots of elements from the previous ones. Barrie asks Peter why did he not play with his brothers, to which he responds that he finds it all silly.

Back at their home, Mary is waiting for Barrie to go to a formal dinner, complaining that he is late. Barrie arrives and tells her that he met Sylvia Llewelyn Davies and her children. Mary says that Sylvia’s husband died of cancer of the jaw and that her mother, Mrs. du Maurier, is very influential and thus they should invite them for dinner. Mary leaves alone for the dinner and Barrie tears his newest play up, believing it to be rubbish.

The next day, Barrie meets Frohman and the acting troupe, who are expecting to read the new play but are frustrated to discover Barrie threw it away. Frohman says that if Barrie cannot write another play fast he will find another writer. Later, Barrie meets with the Llewelyn Davies at the park. Barrie says to Peter that he started writing when he was his age to escape reality. He stimulates him and the rest of the family to use their imagination ("Believe"). Barrie invites Sylvia, her mother and the boys to the dinner his wife is planning.

The following month, the dinner occurs. Mrs. du Maurier tells Mary she is intrigued by Barrie’s relationship with her daughter and grandsons. Frohman arrives with Lord Canaan in an attempt to persuade him to invest in their next play. Barrie gives Peter a notebook as a present, incentivizing him to write a play. During dinner, inspired by a spoon reflecting the light, Barrie claims that the light is a fairy. Bored by the grown-ups' talk, Barrie stops time with his imagination and is joined by the boys, Sylvia and the servants to have their own party ("We Own the Night (The Dinner Party)"). The time unfreezes and Lord Cannan leaves the party offended by Barrie's behavior. Mary scolds him telling that he is behaving like a child.

Mrs. du Maurier gives Sylvia and the children a carriage ride home. Sylvia talks with her mother outside, who is worried that her relationship with Barrie is hurting her prospects. Sylvia is sick and avoiding telling her boys, since her husband recently died. Sylvia wishes to spend the rest of her life living it to the fullest with her boys and contemplates the happiness Barrie has brought to her ("All That Matters").

On another night inside the house, the boys play in their pajamas and refuse to go to sleep ("The Pirates of Kensington (Reprise)"). Barrie is there and watches the boys jumping on their beds, and is inspired as they look like they are flying. They discuss what they should play and Peter suggests they pretend to be castaways and Barrie should be an Indian chief. Peter is offended as Barrie says that as the chief he would raise the castaways as his sons, claiming he is not their father. The boys fight and Sylvia sings them to sleep ("Sylvia's Lullaby"). Barrie confides in Sylvia that when he was Peter's age his brother died, so he knows the pain of loss. Sylvia gives Barrie a thimble, claiming it protects from pain while sewing. Barrie claims his brother went to Neverland, a place he invented where no one ever grows older ("Neverland").

In the theater, Barrie presents his idea based on Neverland for his play to Frohman. Frohman is outraged as he believes the concept will not attract an audience. He also alerts Barrie to comments people have been making about his relationship with Sylvia and the boys. Barrie goes home and finds Mary alone with Lord Canaan. She confronts him with his diary, where he writes a lot about Sylvia, but not about her. She leaves him. Barrie goes to the Llewelyn Davies residence to see Sylvia and the boys, but Mrs. du Maurier stops him at the door claiming Sylvia is in bed and that their relationship is hurting her. Barrie is flustered by all the different pressures he is facing ("Circus of Your Mind").

Seemly defeated, Barrie is visited in his imagination by Captain Hook. A figment of Barrie’s frustrations and strife, Hook convinces Barrie to continue with the play and write him in as the new villain. It is communicated that Hook is a villainous side to Barrie’s personality, but one that he needs nonetheless ("Live by the Hook"). Barrie strides, in his imagination, on a pirate ship with the support of Hook and the pirates. He realizes that he doesn’t need to allow anyone else’s opinion to change his. If he believes in his own work, that's all that truly matters ("Stronger").

=== Act 2 ===
At the beginning of act II, the Llewelyn Davies boys visit Barrie at the theater as the company is reluctant and confused, testing some elements of the new play ("The World is Upside Down"). Charles invites the actors to drink at The Swan, a tavern. Sylvia arrives to take the children home. She has heard that Mary left him. The children convince her to go with Barrie to the tavern as Elliott, Frohman’s assistant, takes them home. Sylvia is afraid that she was part of the reason Mary left Barrie, but he assures her that the separation was long in the making. The two play in the empty theater stage with the shadows cast by the ghost light and try to put to words what their relationship means to each other ("What You Mean to Me").

At the tavern, the company is afraid the play will be a failure. Barrie arrives with Sylvia and tells Frohman that they need children in the audience, asking him to keep 25 seats to orphans. Sylvia remarks that Frohman and the actors have forgotten how to play. They reminisce about old times when they used to live more whimsical and free in their youth ("Play").

In the Llewelyn Davies backyard the boys prepare a play of their own, written by Peter, who is afraid he is not a real writer. His brothers tell him to be proud of what he did and encourage him based on what Barrie has been teaching them ("We're All Made of Stars"). Barrie and Sylvia arrive to watch the play. Barrie asks Peter permission to use his name as the protagonist. They start Peter's play, but during the presentation, Sylvia starts to cough very badly, to which she claims it is only a silly chest cold. Barrie sees blood on the handkerchief, but Sylvia refuses to pursue treatment as she does not want the boys to relieve the experience they had with their father and asks Barrie to take care of her children. Barrie takes Sylvia inside and Peter starts destroying the set of the play. Barrie comes back to check on Peter, who lashes out at him, saying that grown ups are always lying and he does not believe that his mother has just a chest cold, for something similar happened to his father. In rage, he tears his play apart from the notebook Barrie gave him. Barrie comforts him, letting him know that life can be difficult but imagination can help him escape for a bit when needed ("When Your Feet Don't Touch the Ground").

On opening night the company is very nervous, but Frohman encourages them as they prepare to present Peter Pan ("Something About This Night"). Barrie arrives at the Llewelyn Davies residence to pick up the family to see the play. Mrs. du Maurier stops him at the door and forbids him to see her daughter. George intervenes and lets Barrie in, confronting his grandmother. Sylvia is not feeling well and cannot leave the bed, so the children have decided to stay with her. Barrie decides to stay with them as well and miss the opening night to his own play. Sylvia insists that he goes and takes one of the boys with him, as she wants a full report. Michael, Jack and George insist that Peter should be the one to accompany Barrie. Before he leaves, Sylvia gifts him with his notebook, to which she pasted his play back together.

At the theater, Frohman greets the audience, while at the Llewelyn Davies' residence, Jack, George and Michael prepare to go to sleep while Sylvia and Mrs. du Maurier put them to bed. Barrie and Peter arrive with the whole cast claiming that the theater was just a dress rehearsal, for the real opening night would take place at their residence. Peter says that the main character has his name, but the real Peter Pan is Barrie himself. The company presents the show while the family watches amused as they recognize elements of their times together that inspired the play. Sylvia is sprinkled with fairy dust and flies off with Peter to Neverland ("Neverland (Reprise)").

Barrie appears wearing the black clothes in which he started the first scene, showing that he has been mourning Sylvia. He meets Mrs. du Maurier at the park and she explains to him that Sylvia asked them to have joint guardianship of the boys in her will, which he accepts. Barrie then meets Mary accompanied by Lord Canaan. Mary praises Barrie’s play while Lord Cannan acts childishly. Frohman appears next, claiming they are going to make a lot of money with the success that Peter Pan is, to which Barrie responds that he will donate all the profit to a children's hospital. Peter appear next, holding a play which he is working on. He says he is missing his mother, to which Barrie responds that he can visit her anytime he likes in Neverland. The boys appear next and Jack calls Barrie "father" for the first time. Mrs. du Maurier, seeing with new eyes the positive impact Barrie had on the children, says that Sylvia will keep guiding them from Neverland and is joined by Barrie, the boys and the rest of cast in concluding that make believe can help you navigate the world ("Finale").

== Recordings ==
On 9 June 2015 Finding Neverland The Album (Songs From The Broadway Musical) was released, featuring covers of the musical's songs by popular artists such as Zendaya, Kiesza, Nick Jonas, Ellie Goulding, Paloma Faith, Jennifer Lopez, Trey Songz, Christina Aguilera, Jon Bon Jovi, Pentatonix, John Legend, Christina Perri, and Goo Goo Dolls. It debuted at number 114 on the US Billboard 200 and number one on the Billboard Cast Albums chart.

The original Broadway cast recording of Finding Neverland was released on 23 June 2015. It debuted at number 84 on the US Billboard 200 and number one on the Billboard Cast Albums chart.

== Awards and nominations ==
=== Original Broadway production ===
Year	Award Ceremony	Category	Nominee	Result
2015	Drama Desk Award	Outstanding Actor in a Musical	Matthew Morrison	Nominated
2015	Drama Desk Award	Outstanding Featured Actress in a Musical	Carolee Carmello	Nominated
2015	Drama League Award	Distinguished Production of a Musical		Nominated
2015	Drama League Award	Distinguished Performance	Matthew Morrison	Nominated
2015	Drama League Award	Distinguished Performance	Kelsey Grammer	Nominated
2015	Astaire Award	Best Choreographer	Mia Michaels	Nominated
2015	Astaire Award	Best Female Dancer in a Broadway Show	Melanie Moore	Nominated
