= Roscommon (barony) =

Barony (land unit) in County Roscommon, Ireland

Roscommon Ros Comáin (Irish)
- Barony
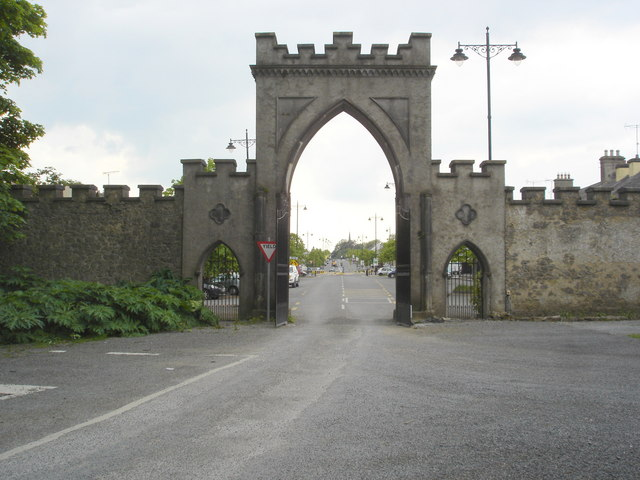
- Gates of Strokestown Park

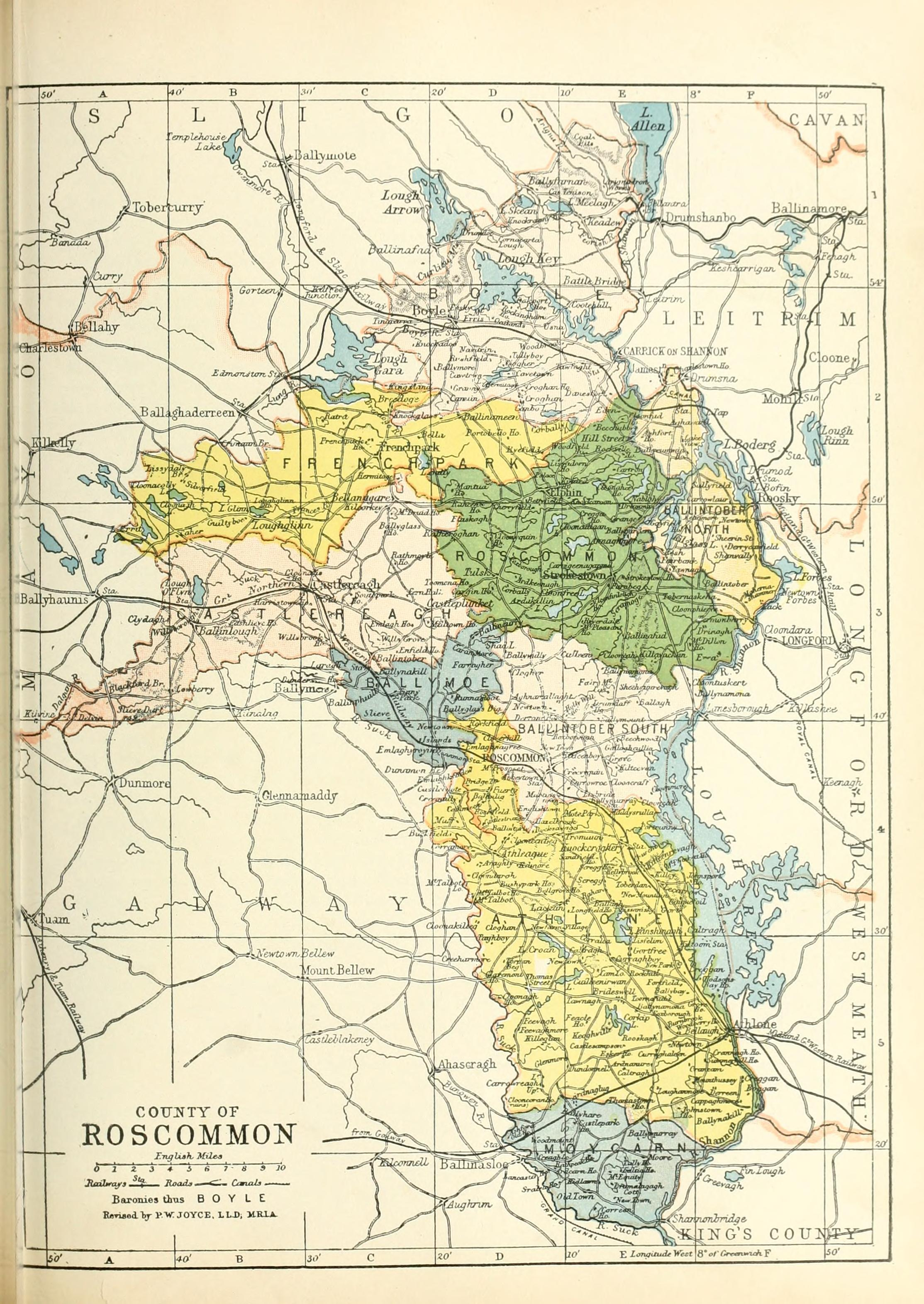
- Barony map of County Roscommon, 1900; Roscommon barony is coloured green, in the centre.
- Sovereign state: Ireland
- Province: Connacht
- County: Roscommon

Area
  - Total: 330.16 km^{2} (127.48 sq mi)

Roscommon (Irish: Ros Comáin) is a barony in County Roscommon, Ireland.

== Etymology ==
Roscommon barony is named after Roscommon town; however, it does not actually contain that town, which is located in Ballintober South.

== Geography ==
Roscommon barony is located in the centre of County Roscommon, an area with many lakes including Lough Boderg. The only mountain is Slieve Bawn.

== History ==
The Mag Oireachtaigh (Mageraghtys) were rulers here of Clann Tomaltaigh and the Muintir Roduib.

The Ó Fídhne (O'Feeney) were also in Roscommon barony. The O'Mulconaire were hereditary historians and bards.

The Ó Maoilbhreanainn (O'Mulrenan) sept were chiefs of Clann Chonchobhair (O'Conor).

It is referred to in the topographical poem Tuilleadh feasa ar Éirinn óigh (Giolla na Naomh Ó hUidhrín, d. 1420):

OMaoilbrenaiin co mbladaiḃ
Ar Cloinn clármaoith Conċoḃair
A maicne os gaċ droing do dliġ
An aicme do Cloinn Chathail.
[...]
Ag Mág Oireaċtaiġ na n-each
Muintir Roduiḃ na righḃreaṫ

("O'Maoilbhrenainn with fame over the irriguous plain of Clann-Conchobhair, Their children are entitled to be above every tribe, that sept of the Clann-Cathail. [...] To Mac Oireachtaigh of the steeds belong Muintir Roduibh of royal judgments.")

== List of settlements ==
Below is a list of settlements in Roscommon barony:

- Elphin
- Strokestown
- Tulsk

== See also ==
- Barony (Ireland)
