= Richard Pike Bissell =

American writer

- Richard Bissell, early 1950s
- Born: June 27, 1913; Dubuque, Iowa
- Died: May 4, 1977 (aged 63); Dubuque, Iowa
- Education: Harvard College
- Occupation: Author
- Spouse: Marian Van Patten Grilk
- Children: 4
- Writing career
- Notable works: 7½ Cents, The Pajama Game, Say, Darling
- Notable awards: Tony Award for Best Musical, 1955

Richard Pike Bissell (June 27, 1913 – May 4, 1977) was an American author of short stories and novels. His third book, and second novel, 7½ Cents, was adapted into the Broadway musical The Pajama Game. This won him (along with co-author George Abbott) the 1955 Tony Award for Best Musical. He wrote a book about the experience called Say, Darling, which chronicled the ins and outs of a Broadway musical production and featured characters based on those (such as Harold Prince) he worked with; this book was also turned into a musical, also called Say, Darling, in 1958.

== Early life ==
Bissell was born, in Dubuque, Iowa, the second son of Frederick Ezekiel Bissell, a factory owner, and Edith Mary Pike Bissell, in Dubuque, Iowa. He graduated from Phillips Exeter Academy in 1932, and graduated from Harvard College in 1936, with a B.A. in anthropology.

== Career ==
After college, Bissell worked tor Polaroid, and worked in the Venezuelan oil fields, later signing on as a seaman on an American Export Lines freighter. In 1938, he married Marian Van Patten Grilk, returning to Dubuque, and living on a Mississippi River houseboat, then worked for the family clothing manufacturer business, H. B. Glover Company. After being rejected by the Navy for enlistment during World War II because of poor eyesight, Bissell worked river towboats in the Midwest, rising from a deckhand to a river pilot. After the war, he returned to Dubuque and resumed his work for the garment factory founded by his great-grandfather in 1845. He published articles on his war experiences in Atlantic Monthly, Collier's, and Esquire.

The Bissell family moved to the East coast so he could turn his book, 7½ Cents, into a Broadway musical, which later became a motion picture. This inspired his novel Say, Darling, which also became a Broadway musical.

Bissell wrote works about his experiences on the Mississippi River, including, novels: A Stretch on the River, High Water, Goodbye Ava, The Monongahela, and the non-fiction: My Life on the Mississippi or Why I am Not Mark Twain, that had some critics comparing him to Mark Twain. Bissell's 7½ Cents was based on his experiences in the garment industry, written while he was the vice-president of his family's Dubuque pajama factory.

He wrote a memoir of his experiences at Harvard, You Can Always Tell a Harvard Man (McGraw Hill, 1965). He worked on a freighter on the American Export Business Lines and riverboats, served as vice president at a Dubuque clothing manufacturer which had been bought by his great-grandfather (who worked his way from the bottom to the top of the company).

== Personal life ==
On February 15, 1938, he married Marian Van Patten Grilk, an editor, who he met at Phillips Exeter Academy, raising a daughter, Anastasia, and three sons, Thomas, Nathaniel, and Samuel, and living in a 1909 Fairfield, Connecticut, home designed by Stanford White. Bissell belonged to 11 historical societies, spent his summers in Boothbay Harbor, Maine, collected antique cars to saloon pianos, and a majestic 11-foot mirror from Mark Twain's New York home. A 2017 biographical article in The Iowan Magazine noted that "his gravestone in the Linwood Cemetery contains an etching of the upper Mississippi, much like the one he had to draw to get his pilot’s license, cutting straight through, from corner to corner." He lived for several years in Rowayton, Connecticut. Bissell was a member of The Lambs from 1956.

=== Death ===
In 1975, Bissell moved back to Dubuque, Iowa to live in the house his grandfather built. He died in a Dubuque hospital on May 4, 1977, of a brain tumor.

== Works ==
- A Stretch on the River (1950)
- The Monongahela, Rivers of America Series, (1952)
- 7½ Cents (1953)
- High Water: A Novel of Adventure on a Mississippi River Towboat (1954)
- Say, Darling (1959)
- Good Bye, Ava (1960)
- You Can Always Tell a Harvard Man (1962)
- Still Circling Moose Jaw (1965)
- How Many Miles to Galena; or, Baked, Hashed Brown, or French Fried? (1968)
- Julia Harrington, Winnebago, Iowa, 1913 (1969)
- My Life on the Mississippi, or Why I Am Not Mark Twain (1973)
- New Light on 1776 and All That (1975)

== Influence ==
In 2008, Elmore Leonard cited Richard Bissell as a major influence in formation of his style because he felt Bissell could be naturally funny:

Once I realized he (Ernest Hemingway) doesn't have much of a sense of humor, at least he doesn't show it in his books then I had to find someone else. And there was a writer by the name of Richard Bissell and Bissell wrote 7½ Cents which became The Pajama Game and wrote books set on the Mississippi river where he was a pilot, a towboat pilot I don't know for how long. Then he wrote about five books and he had such a natural style. There was humor on his towboat guys' talk, but it was never forced. He wasn't trying to be funny. That was the main point. I thought that's the way to do it. That's the way.

== Awards ==
- Tony Award for Best Musical (Book), 1955: The Pajama Game, George Abbott & Richard Pike Bissell
