= Garraty =

Garraty is a surname. Notable people with the surname include:

- Billy Garraty (1878–1931), English footballer
- John A. Garraty (1920–2007), American historian and biographer
- Raymond Garraty, fictional character

== See also ==
- Garrity
