= Kevin Kern (actor) =

American Broadway actor (born 1974)

Kevin Michael Kern (born May 18, 1974, in Ohio) is a Broadway actor. He originated the role of J. M. Barrie on the 2016 National Tour of Finding Neverland. He has appeared in six Broadway shows and one show in London's West End. He is married to Megan Lawrence and they have four children named Gus, Sunny Jo, Magnolia, and Clover.

== Credits ==
His Broadway credits include Fiyero in Wicked, standby J.M. Barrie in Finding Neverland, and standby Robert in The Bridges of Madison County, as well as roles in The Wedding Singer, First Date, and Les Misérables. (In Les Mis, he played numerous roles, including Marius, Jean Prouvaire, Joly and Marius (understudy) with the "approximate dates: 1997 to 1999; 2001 to 2003 (not necessarily continuously)."

http://www.playbill.com/person/kevin-kern-vault-0000047611

== Education ==
He is a cum laude graduate of New York University. He has a B.M. in Vocal Performance and a "full scholarship and one year study - M.A. in Music Vocal Performance." Prior to NYU, he was a 1992 graduate of St. Xavier High School (Cincinnati).

== Personal life ==
He married Megan Lawrence in June 1999. They have four children. His brother is actor and director Joey Kern.
