= Thomas Patrick Gerrity =

United States Air Force general (1913–1968)

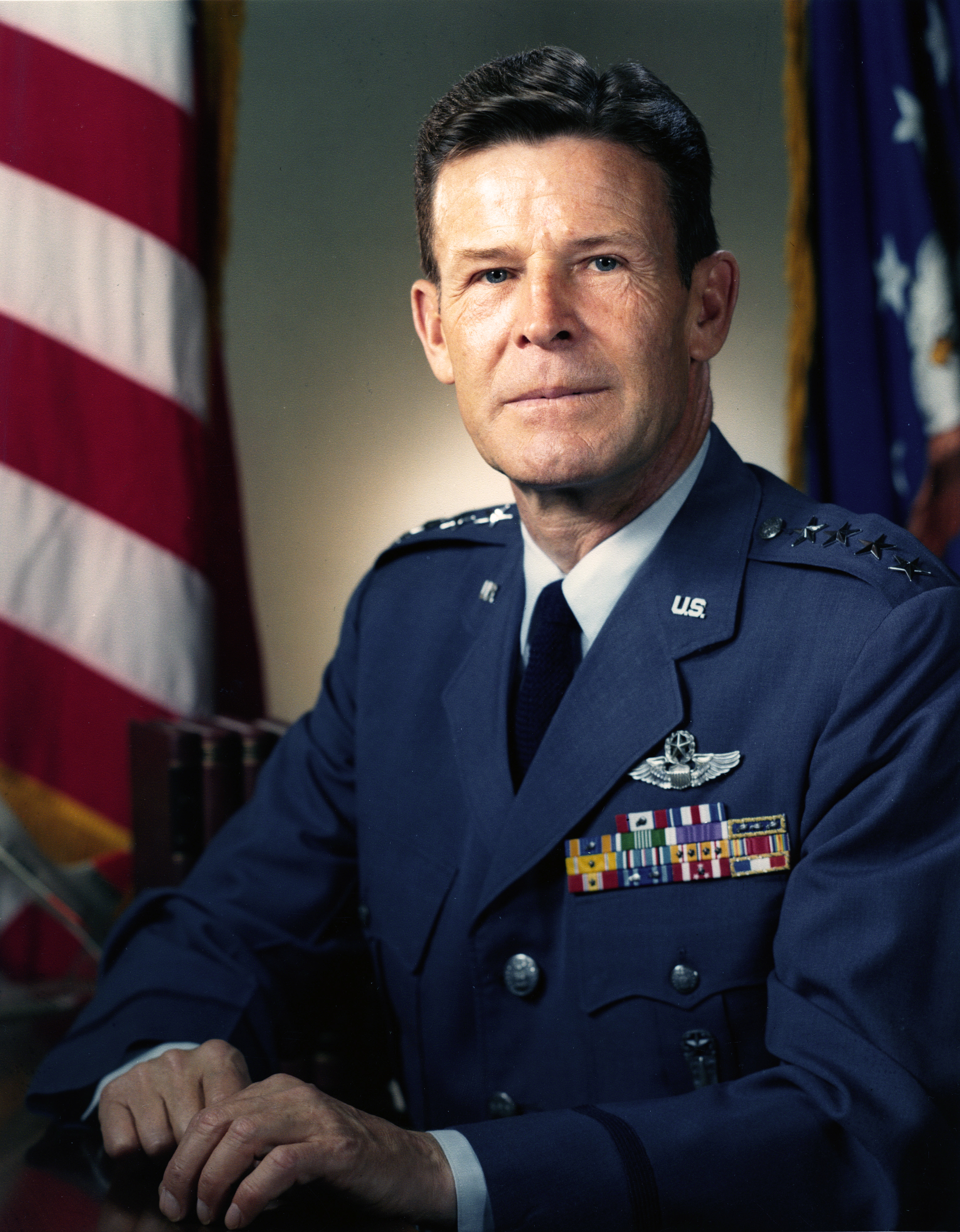
- Born: December 8, 1913; Harlowton, Montana, US
- Died: February 24, 1968 (aged 54); Wright-Patterson Air Force Base, Ohio
- Burial place: Arlington National Cemetery
- Relatives: Thomas P. Gerrity (son)
- Military career
- Allegiance: United States of America
- Branch: United States Air Force
- Service years: 1939-1968
- Rank: General
- Commands: Air Force Logistics Command
- Conflicts: World War II
- Awards: Air Force Distinguished Service Medal (2); Silver Star; Air Medal (2); Purple Heart

General Thomas Patrick Gerrity (December 8, 1913 – February 24, 1968) was a United States Air Force general and was commander of the Air Force Logistics Command at Wright-Patterson Air Force Base, Ohio.

Gerrity was born in Harlowton, Montana, in 1913. His family moved to Chicago, Illinois, when he was a child. He graduated from St. Leo High School in 1930, attended Tilden Tech and later the Armour Institute, now the Illinois Institute of Technology, all three schools located in Chicago. He entered military service in August 1939 as an aviation cadet, completed flying school in May 1940 and was commissioned a second lieutenant in the Army Air Corps Reserve.

His first assignment was with the 15th Bombardment Squadron at Barksdale Field, Louisiana, and in October 1940 he was transferred to the 17th Bombardment Squadron at Savannah Field, Georgia. While stationed at Savannah, he attended Armstrong Junior College.

He went to the Philippine Islands in October 1941 with the 17th Bombardment Squadron and was assigned to the Air Ground Support Section of the Luzon Forces. In February 1942 he joined the 21st Pursuit Squadron at Bataan, transferring in April to the 13th Bombardment Squadron for duty in Australia. He assumed command of the 90th Bombardment Squadron on New Guinea in August 1942. During this period he flew 49 combat missions.

In November 1942 Gerrity was assigned to the Army Air Forces Materiel Command at Wright Field, Dayton, Ohio, as project officer on North American B-25 Mitchell, Martin B-26 Marauder, Boeing B-29 Superfortress, Consolidated B-32 Dominator, Northrop YB-35 and Convair B-36 bombardment aircraft. During this assignment he attended the Command and General Staff School at Fort Leavenworth, Kansas. After graduation in October 1945 he resumed his former position at Wright Field, and in January 1946 became chief of the Bomber Branch in the Aircraft and Missile Section. While Chief of the Bomber Branch he attended the advanced management course at Harvard University. Later he was named chief of the Aircraft and Missile Section.

In March 1950 Gerrity assumed command of the 11th Bombardment Group, Strategic Air Command at Carswell Air Force Base, Texas. He was transferred to Headquarters U.S. Air Force, Washington, D.C., in March 1953 as director of procurement and production engineering in the Office of the Deputy Chief of Staff for Materiel and later was named assistant for production programming in the same office.

Gerrity was transferred to the Air Materiel Command in August 1957 and assumed command of the Oklahoma City Air Materiel Area at Tinker Air Force Base, Oklahoma. In July 1960 he was appointed commander of the Ballistic Missile Center of the Air Materiel Command at Los Angeles, California. As a result of the reorganization of the Air Research and Development Command and the Air Materiel Command into the Air Force Systems Command in April 1961, General Gerrity became the first commander of the Ballistic Systems Division in Inglewood, California.

In July 1962 Gerrity became deputy chief of staff for systems and logistics at Headquarters U.S. Air Force, Washington, D.C. He also served as senior Air Force member, Military Staff Committee, United Nations. In August 1967 he became commander of the Air Force Logistics Command at Wright-Patterson Air Force Base, Ohio.

His decorations included the Air Force Distinguished Service Medal with oak leaf cluster, Silver Star, Air Medal with oak leaf cluster, Army Commendation Medal, and the Purple Heart. He received an honorary doctor of humanities degree from the University of Tulsa, Oklahoma.

At 7:30 pm on February 24, 1968, Gerrity was "stricken at his home" by a heart attack and rushed to the hospital at Wright-Patterson Air Force Base. He was pronounced dead on arrival. He was later buried in Arlington National Cemetery. Upon his wife, Margaret B. Gerrity's death in 1979, she was buried next to him.
