= Michael Martin Hammer =

American engineer and author

- Born: April 13, 1948; Annapolis, Maryland
- Died: September 3, 2008 (aged 60)
- Known for: Business process reengineering
- Children: Four, including Jessica Hammer

Academic background
- Education: Massachusetts Institute of Technology

Michael Martin Hammer (April 13, 1948 – September 3, 2008) was a Jewish-American engineer, management author, and professor of computer science at the Massachusetts Institute of Technology (MIT). Hammer and James A. Champy founded the management theory of business process reengineering (BPR), which they presented in their best-selling Reengineering the Corporation: A Manifesto for Business Revolution in 1993.

== Biography ==
=== Early life and education ===
Hammer was born in Annapolis, Maryland. He attended Massachusetts Institute of Technology, earning his bachelor's degree in math in 1968. He earned his master's degree in electrical engineering in 1970 and his doctorate in computer science in 1973. He married Phyllis Thurm Hammer in 1973; they lived in Newton, Massachusetts with their four children, including Jessica.

=== Career ===
After graduating from MIT, Hammer started his career as a professor of computer science at the institute. He additionally was a lecturer's assistant in the MIT Sloan School of Management. In 1987, he transitioned to working as a managing consultant. Drawing on his training as an engineer, he proposed a process-oriented view of business management, emphasizing strategies which could enable businesses to reliably perform quality work. He developed a focus on the potential of "reengineering" corporations by evaluating existing business processes and developing new, more effective practices. This work inspired his international bestseller, Reengineering the Corporation. He later launched the managing consulting firm Hammer and Company in Cambridge, Massachusetts; he was the company's president, directing the firm's focus on research and business education.

He spent much of his later career as a lecturer, consultant, and author. Articles written by Hammer have been published in the Harvard Business Review and The Economist. In addition to Reengineering the Corporation, coauthored with James Champy, he individually wrote The Reengineering Revolution: A Handbook and Beyond Reengineering: How the Process-centered Organization is Reshaping Our Work and Our Lives.

Forbes magazine ranked Reengineering the Corporation third on its list of the "20 most influential business books of the last 20 years". In 1996,TIME named him one of America's 25 most influential individuals.

=== Death ===
At age 60, Hammer died from complications of a brain hemorrhage he suffered while on vacation. His funeral was held in Stanetsky Memorial Chapel and he was buried in the Baker Street Jewish Cemeteries in West Roxbury, Boston.

== Legacy ==
Business Process Re-engineering

BPR became really popular during the 1990s, due to many business struggling to make profits due to competition, markets, and increase in modern technology. BPR the ability to redesign business processes by making critical improvements to the inner structure of the company like quality, cost, services, output, and efficiency. The main goal would be to cut down costs and improve processes to make things more efficient. Every organization is different in its own way, but following the 5 business RE-engineering steps can dramatically cut down expenses and improve quality and service across the board granting them competitive advantage with in the industry. The 5 BPR steps are:

1. define and analyze the current state of business processes
2. determine the vision for the redesign
3. Identify and redesign
4. Design and run test on prototype
5. implement/ monitor the new system changes and be mindful of dependencies
6. establish performance measures

=== Hammer and Company ===
Hammer launched Hammer and Company as a research and business education firm. The company focuses more on discovering major issues in business operations, organizations, management, process. Hammer being well known for Business process re-engineering, he was able to redesign and reiterate how corporations should improve their process by incorporating Methodology like Lean and Six Sigma. This was done by measuring and managing them. Hammers contribution allowed corporations to achieve unparalleled and efficient improvements in their operating performance. Over a couple of years Hammer and CO was able to help multi companies capitalize on the power of process. His Ideas are still relevant today, it has embedded itself within business and organizations.

=== Hammer idea of revolution ===
Hammer's vision was not to fix anything but to restart, start from scratch, he believed that the re-engineering was misunderstood and misinterpreted. He Re-engineered the business process into a brand new structure designed to increase productivity and create more jobs among corporations. One of the ways that contributed to evolution of Business process where he redesigned the hierarchy of directors, managers, and workers. Hammer changed the traditional chain of command more into a collaborative relationship. This re-collaborated how managers would focus more on increase development of employees instead of supervising them. Hammers ideas allowed companies to make fundamental changes to their process and procedure. Which will overall increase their performance.

At the time, the Business model was old and outdated, Hammer was able to realize it needed to be integrated with the current economy. Hammer integrated the increased power of modern information technology. Which allowed multiple businesses to achieve some sufficient improvements to their productivity, lower cost, increase quality, better service. The new principle to this model was to encourage the Specialization of labor to an end to end processes, generally creating more value for the customer. Not only does it benefit the customer but it also will assist in escalating more job growth and production.

== Publications ==
- Reengineering the Corporation: A manifesto for Business Revolution (1993), which Hammer he co-authored with James A. Champy, was instrumental in capturing the focus of business community towards Business Process Reengineering (BPR). 2.5 million copies of the book were sold, and the book remained on the New York Times Best Seller list for more than a year.
- The Reengineering Revolution (1995)
- Beyond Reengineering (1996)
- The Agenda (2001)
- Faster, Cheaper, Better (2010), co-authored with Lisa Hershman
