= Tom McGarrity =

Scottish footballer (1922–1999)

Personal information
- Full name: Thomas Welsh McGarrity
- Date of birth: 24 November 1922
- Place of birth: Scotstoun, Scotland
- Date of death: 17 March 1999 (aged 76)
- Place of death: Oxford, England
- Position: Inside forward

Youth career
- St Mungo's Academy
- Arthurlie

Senior career*
Years	Team	Apps	(Gls)
1946–1952	Morton	128	(34)
1952–1953	Southampton	5	(1)
1953–1954	Headington United		
1954–19??	Banbury Spencer		
- * Club domestic league appearances and goals

Thomas Welsh McGarrity (24 November 1922 – 17 March 1999) was a Scottish footballer who played as an inside forward in the 1940s and 1950s. After starting his professional career with Morton, he moved to England in 1952 where he played for Southampton. He later became the physiotherapist for Oxford United.

== Playing career ==
McGarrity was born in Scotstoun, west of Glasgow City Centre. He was educated at St Mungo's Academy and played junior football with Arthurlie, gaining schoolboy honours for Scotland in the late 1930s. During World War II, McGarrity served with the Royal Air Force as a navigator.

After the war, he signed for Morton in August 1946, where he stayed for six years making 128 Scottish League appearances, scoring 34 goals. In 1949–50, McGarrity was part of the Morton team that won the Division B title. He was offered the chance to Join Celtic, but his mother, a devout Catholic, was concerned that he might become involved in sectarian rivalry, so he turned down the move.

Described as "highly intelligent, but with abroad streak of pragmatism", he walked out of Morton in 1952 in a row over his wages. He moved to Maidenhead in England where he practiced as a physiotherapist, having gained his qualifications while playing.

When Ted Bates became aware of his availability, he signed McGarrity for Southampton for £4,500 in November 1952. Although he scored on his debut with the opening goal in a 5–1 victory over Hull City on 29 November, a few days after his 30th birthday. McGarrity only made a further four appearances for the Saints' first-team, with Johnny Walker preferred at inside-left. At the end of the season, Southampton were relegated to the Third Division. McGarrity fell out with Southampton in a dispute over financial matters and refused to sign on for the 1953–54 season.

== Later career ==
McGarrity decided to quit full-time football and resumed his physiotherapy practice, working in various hospitals in Oxford, becoming head of the Physiotherapy Geriatrics Department at the Radcliffe Infirmary.

He continued to play part-time football for Headington United and Banbury Spencer. In the late 1980s he became Oxford United's physio.

== Honours ==
Morton

- Scottish League Division B champions: 1949–50

== Bibliography ==
- Chalk, Gary; Holley, Duncan; Bull, David (2013). All the Saints – A Complete Players' Who's Who of Southampton FC. Hagiology Publishing. ISBN 978-0-9926864-0-6.
- Holley, Duncan; Chalk, Gary (1992). The Alphabet of the Saints. ACL & Polar Publishing. ISBN 0-9514862-3-3.
- Holley, Duncan; Chalk, Gary (2003). In That Number – A Post-war Chronicle of Southampton FC. Hagiology Publishing. ISBN 0-9534474-3-X.
- Hugman, Barry (1981). Football League Players Records (1946–1981). Aylesbury: Rothmans Publications. ISBN 0-907574-08-4.
