= Ken Garrity =

English footballer

Personal information
- Full name: Kenneth Garrity
- Date of birth: 6 August 1935
- Place of birth: Blackburn, England
- Date of death: May 2016 (aged 80)
- Place of death: Wirral, England
- Positions: Forward; full back

Senior career*
Years	Team	Apps	(Gls)
1958–1960	Accrington Stanley	37	(5)
- Chorley
- Darwen
- * Club domestic league appearances and goals

Kenneth Garrity (6 August 1935 – May 2016) was an English professional footballer who played as a forward or full back in the Football League for Accrington Stanley. He also played non-league football for clubs including Chorley and Darwen.
