= Peter Gerahty =

Colonel Peter Gerahty CBE
- Born: 1 September 1921; Cyprus
- Died: 15 September 2013 (aged 92)
- Education: Malvern College
- Spouse: Arminell Morshead
- Children: 2
- Relatives: Charles Cyril Gerahty
- Military career
- Allegiance: British
- Branch: Army
- Rank: Colonel
- Service number: 207799
- Unit: 6th Airborne Division
- Commands: Oxfordshire and Buckinghamshire Light Infantry
- Conflicts: Operation Varsity

Colonel Peter Gerahty CBE (1 September 1921 – 15 November 2013) was one of the last surviving British Army officers to have served with 6th Airborne Division in Operation Varsity on 24 March 1945: the largest airborne operation in the history of warfare, part of Operation Plunder: the Rhine Crossing in March 1945. He was later appointed a CBE for his work on combat development with the Ministry of Defence.

== Biography ==
Peter Echlin Gerahty was born in Cyprus, the eldest son of Sir Charles Cyril Gerahty QC. He was educated at Malvern College, Malvern, Worcestershire. Gerahty was commissioned into the Oxfordshire and Buckinghamshire Light Infantry in September 1941 and was posted to the 5th Oxfordshire and Buckinghamshire Light Infantry. He served with 9th Parachute Battalion from July 1944 to September 1944 when he transferred to the 2nd Oxfordshire and Buckinghamshire Light Infantry (the 52nd) and joined the battalion at Bulford, Wiltshire.

He served with the 2nd Ox and Bucks in the Ardennes and the Netherlands from December 1944 to February 1945. Gerahty took part in Operation Varsity: the gliderborne air assault landing over the River Rhine on 24 March 1945 which was the last major battle on the Western Front in the Second World War. He commanded the recce platoon, Letter C Company, 2nd Ox and Bucks, whose objective was Hamminkeln railway station; the scene of some of the fiercest fighting during Operation Varsity. He then took part in the advance across Germany to the Baltic Sea. In August 1945, Gerahty led the advance party of 2nd Ox and Bucks in India, preparing for an airborne assault in the East Asia, when the Japanese army surrendered.

He served as Adjutant of the 2nd Ox and Bucks in Palestine from October 1945 to September 1947. Gerahty was second-in-command of the 1st Oxfordshire and Buckinghamshire Light Infantry, 43rd and 52nd and the 1st Green Jackets (43rd and 52nd) from July 1958 to July 1960. He served at HQ East Africa Command, in Kenya, from August 1960 to September 1962. He commanded the Oxfordshire and Buckinghamshire Light Infantry (TA) from April 1963 to September 1965. Gerahty was promoted to colonel in June 1969 and following posts at the Ministry of Defence he retired from the Army in September 1976. He was appointed MBE in June 1962 and CBE in the New Year Honours list 1977.

He married Arminell Morshead in 1952 with whom he was to have a son and daughter. He lived in Langport, Somerset.

Colonel Peter Gerahty CBE died on 15 November 2013.
