= James A. Champy =

Italian-American business consultant (born 1942)

- Born: April 22, 1942 (age 84); Lawrence, Massachusetts, U.S.
- Education: Boston College Law School
- Known for: Business process reengineering

James A. Champy (born 1942) is an Italian-American business consultant, and organizational theorist, known for his work in the field of business process reengineering, business process improvement and organizational change. He co-authored the book Reengineering the Corporation: A Manifesto for Business Revolution in 1993 with Michael Martin Hammer, which was considered one of the 25 most influential business management books by Time.

== Biography ==
=== Education ===
Champy earned his B.S. in 1963 and his M.S. in Civil Engineering in 1965 from Massachusetts Institute of Technology, and a J.D. degree from Boston College Law School in 1968.

=== Career ===
Champy consults with senior-level executives of multinational companies seeking to improve business performance. His approach centers on helping leaders achieve business results through four distinct, yet overlapping areas: business strategy, management and operations, organizational development and change, and information technology.

Champy was chairman and chief executive officer of CSC Index, the management consulting arm of Computer Sciences Corporation. He had been one of the original founders of Index, a $200 million consulting practice that was acquired by CSC in 1988. Subsequently, he was chairman of Dell Perot Systems (now Dell Services) consulting practice, where he was responsible for providing direction and guidance to the company’s team of business and management consultants.

=== Legacy ===
Champy was a senior research fellow at Harvard's Advanced Leadership Initiative from 2011–2015. He is a life member of the MIT Corporation, Massachusetts Institute of Technology's board of trustees, and serves on the board of overseers of the Boston College Law School. He is also a member of the board of directors of Analog Devices, Inc.

Champy is a member of the MIT School of Engineering Dean's Advisory Council (DAC).

James and his wife, Lois, established the James A. '68 and Lois Champy Fund, to fund scholarships for students pursuing public interest law at Boston College Law School.

== Selected publications ==
- Michael Hammer, and James Champy. Reengineering the Corporation: Manifesto for Business Revolution, 1993.
- Champy, James. Reengineering management., 1995.
- Champy, James. X-engineering the corporation. New York, NY: Warner Books, 2002.
- James Champy and Harry Greenspun. Reengineering Healthcare: A Manifesto for Radically Rethinking Health Care Delivery. FT Press, 2010.

Articles, a selection

- Champy, James A. "Preparing for organizational change." The organization of the future (1997): 9-16.
