= 7½ Cents =

1953 novel by Richard Bissell

7 1/2 Cents
- First edition cover
- Author: Richard Bissell
- Cover artist: Jane Pitts
- Language: English
- Published: 1953 (Atlantic-Little, Brown)
- Media type: Print (Hardback)
- Pages: 245

7 1/2 Cents is a 1953 novel by Richard Bissell, his third book and second novel. It was a selection of the Book-of-the-Month Club. With George Abbott, Bissell adapted it into the musical The Pajama Game, which was a hit on Broadway and won the 1955 Tony Award for Best Musical.

The novel is set in the fictional Junction City, Iowa, (Note: There is a real Junction City in several states, including nearby Illinois and Missouri.) a few years after the end of the Second World War. The novel humorously follows the problems of Sidney Sorokin from Chicago, recently hired as a labor superintendent at the Sleep Tite pajama factory, as the union stages a slowdown over its demand for a 7 1/2 cents per hour wage increase.

== Plot summary ==
Sid Sorokin, the new superintendent at the Sleep Tite pajama factory, finds himself patching up endless little problems caused by the cheapskate policies of his boss, Myron Hasler, acting for T. J. O'Hara, the owner who is taking a long vacation in the middle of nowhere. Hasler is a devotee of conservative radio pundit Fulton Lewis, ardently anti-union, and a self-proclaimed "fighter", but with no previous experience in the garment industry.

Sorokin begins dating worker Catherine "Babe" Williams about the time the union is pushing for the same 7 1/2 cents-per-hour raise that other garment workers have been receiving. Rejected flat-out by Hasler, Williams leads the workers in a slowdown. Sorokin finds himself caught between his love for Williams, who is now keeping Sorokin at a certain distance, and Hasler's stubbornness.

As orders pour in for the Christmas season, Hasler gets frantic, and demands that Williams be fired. Sorokin explains that will only lead to a strike, so Hasler relents, but Sorokin finds himself very unhappy that weekend. Williams has to leave for an uncle's wake and funeral in Wisconsin. Sorokin gets himself drunk and dragged to a party at the wealthy Watson's house, where the spoiled heiress takes him to bed. Sorokin arrives at work Monday morning unsure of himself as Williams has still not returned. The union representative arrives and fails to convince Hasler to budge. A nationally famous management consultant hired by Hasler arrives on Tuesday, and also tells Hasler, rather pointedly, that he has to concede, and is dismissed. But the consultant runs into O'Hara, returning from his long vacation, gets him up to speed, and O'Hara chews out Hasler as Sleep Tite faces the threat of losing a three-state forty-store chain's business.

Sorokin announces to everyone that the 7 1/2 cents-per-hour raise is effective (and retroactive) and that overtime rates apply for the time being. Hasler wants to speak with Sorokin, but Sorokin announces he is quitting. That evening he returns to his apartment, depressed, and is surprised to find Williams inside waiting for him. She also has quit, and they start talking about honeymoon plans.

== Reception ==
... an oddly likable piece of Americana.

— –, Time

7 1/2 Cents is the most entertaining piece of foolishness I've read in a long time.

— Charles Poore, New York Times

In working out the ramifications of this particular segment of the class struggle, Mr. Bissell has made a modest but significant contribution toward the folklore of American capitalism.

— Nathan Glick, Commentary
