= Gerety =

Gerety is a surname. Notable people with the surname include:

- Anne Gerety (1926–2003), American actress
- Mary Frances Gerety, American advertisement copywriter
- Megan Gerety (born 1971), American alpine ski racer
- Peter Gerety (born 1940), American actor
- Peter Leo Gerety (1912–2016), American Catholic prelateh
- Tom Gerety, lawyer, philosopher, school administrator
