= Charles Cyril Gerahty =

Chief Justice of Trinidad and Tobago from 1937 to 1943

Sir Charles Cyril Gerahty
- Born: 17 June 1888; Epping, Essex, United Kingdom
- Died: 6 June 1978 (aged 89); Sussex, United Kingdom
- Occupation: Colonial judge
- Office: Chief Justice of Trinidad and Tobago
- Spouse: Ethel Murray (m. 1915)

Sir Charles Cyril Gerahty (17 June 1888 – 6 June 1978) was a British colonial judge who became Chief Justice of Trinidad and Tobago.

He was born near Epping, Essex, as the second son of civil servant Charles Echlin Gerahty, from a family from Dungannon, County Tyrone.

He entered the Middle Temple in 1906 to study law and was called to the bar on 23 June 1909. After military service in the First World War, he joined the British Colonial Legal Service and served in a judicial capacity in Cyprus before being appointed Attorney General there in 1926. In 1932, he moved to the Straits Settlements as a puisne judge and in 1934 to Malta as Legal Advisor to the government there. From 1937 to 1943, he was Chief Justice of Trinidad and Tobago.

He was knighted in the 1939 Birthday Honours.

He married Ethel Murray in 1915. Their son, born in Cyprus, was Colonel Peter Gerahty. He died in Sussex in 1978.
