= McGarrity =

McGarrity is a surname. Notable people with the surname include:

- John McGarrity (1925–2006), Scottish footballer
- Joseph McGarrity (1874–1940), Irish Republican
- Kevin McGarrity (born 1973), Northern Irish racing driver
- Mark C. McGarrity (1943–2002), better known by his pen name Bartholomew Gill, American writer
- Michael McGarrity (born 1939), American writer
- Tom McGarrity (1922–1999), Scottish footballer
