= Rosenstrasse (game) =

Historical indie roleplaying game

- Designers: Jessica Hammer, Moyra Turkington
- Publication: 2022
- Genres: indie role-playing game, tabletop role-playing game, historical

Rosenstrasse is an historical indie role-playing game by Jessica Hammer and Moyra Turkington that explores the erosion of Jewish civil liberties in Nazi Germany, culminating in the Rosenstrasse protest, an uprising in which nearly 1,500 non-Jewish wives of Jewish men saved their husbands from deportation. Each player is responsible for playing two pre-generated characters from a set of four married couples, in order to examine the historical scenario from different perspectives. Rosenstrasse was nominated for the 2023 Diana Jones Award for Excellence in Gaming and the 2022 ENNIE Award for Best Writing, was an official selection at IndieCade 2017, and was featured at XOXO (festival) in 2019. The game has also been the subject of academic scholarship.

== Inspiration ==
In an article for the Association for Jewish Studies, Hammer and Turkington explained that their goal in creating Rosenstrasse was:

to educate players about a lesser-known historical moment; to inspire them to resist oppression in their daily lives; and to help them start conversations about activism.

== Scholarship ==
In Designing Ourselves: Empathy, Bias, and Game Design, Dr. Karen Schrier discusses Rosenstrasse as a tool for honing ethical decision-making. Anthropologist Nathan LaBlanc wrote an article about Rosenstrasse as an example of how roleplaying games can be used in the field of ethnography.
