= Jessica Hammer =

American computer scientist

- Education: Harvard University; New York University; Columbia University
- Father: Michael Martin Hammer
- Scientific career
- Fields: Psychology of games
- Workplaces: Human-Computer Interaction Institute; Entertainment Technology Center
- Website: replayable.net

Jessica Hammer is an associate professor in the Human-Computer Interaction Institute at Carnegie Mellon University, where she is the director of the Center for Transformational Play, and a game designer.

== Early life and education ==
Hammer, who was a finalist in the Regeneron Science Talent Search, attended the Maimonides School, in Brookline, Massachusetts.

She is the daughter of Michael Martin Hammer.

She earned her B.A. in computer science at Harvard University, her MS from the NYU Interactive Telecommunications Program and her Ph.D. in cognitive science at Columbia University, where she developed the game design course sequence and was a founding member of the Teachers College EGGPLANT game research laboratory.

== Career ==
Hammer's research focuses on the psychology of games, focusing on the way specific game design decisions affect how players think and feel.

While a graduate student at Columbia, Hammer helped create Lit, a mobile game designed to help individuals quit smoking. Hammer has worked on video games for the National Institute of Health and for Nokia.

She also spent time in Ethiopia, working with local partners to create game clubs that help girls acquire the social capital and the skills they need to solve their problems for themselves. In 2014 she was selected as a World Economic Forum Young Scientist.

In his 1998 book, Why We Don 't Talk to Each Other Anymore: The De-Voicing of Society, biolinguist John L. Locke discusses the research produced by Hammer as a young researcher working with Simon Baron-Cohen. According to Locke, Baron-Cohen and Hammer found that the parents of individuals with Asperger's syndrome did less well than the general population on tasks involving the interpretation of emotional status of others by looking at the expression of their eyes, and better than the general population at identifying shapes embedded within complex designs.

Since 2014, Hammer's recent projects include exploring live action role-playing games as a potential avenue for improving mental or physical health, and conducting research on how games may reduce opioid abuse after work-related injuries.

Currently, Hammer works as an associate professor at Carnegie Mellon University, jointly appointed between the HCI Institute and the Entertainment Technology Center. She teaches courses related to Game Design and Learning Media, and directs the Center for Transformational Play.

Hammer co-designed the 2022 tabletop role-playing game Rosenstrasse.
