= Hank Garrity =

Hank Garrity is the name of:

- Hank Garrity (coach) (1900–1972), American college football, baseball and basketball coach
- Hank Garrity (baseball) (1908–1962), American baseball player
