= The Pajama Game (album) =

Soundtrack album by Doris Day, John Raitt
- Released: August 12, 1957
- Genre: Pop
- Label: Columbia

Doris Day chronology
Day by Day (1956)	The Pajama Game (1957)	Day by Night (1957)

The Pajama Game is an album released on August 12, 1957 by Columbia Records. It contains songs from the movie of the same name, mostly sung by Doris Day and John Raitt. The catalog number was OL-5210.

Professional ratings
Review scores
Source	Rating
Allmusic	link

== Track listing ==
All songs by Jerry Ross and Richard Adler.

1. "The Pajama Game" (Opening) (Eddie Foy, Jr. and Ensemble)
2. "Racing with the Clock" (Foy, Jr. and Ensemble)
3. "I'm Not at All in Love" (Doris Day and the Girls)
4. "I'll Never Be Jealous Again" (Foy, Jr. and Reta Shaw)
5. "Hey There" (John Raitt)
6. "Once-a-Year Day" (Day, Raitt and Ensemble)
7. "Small Talk" (Day and Raitt)
8. "There Once Was a Man" (Day and Raitt)
9. "Steam Heat" (Carol Haney, Kenneth Le Roy and Buzz Miller)
10. "Hernando's Hideaway" (Haney and Ensemble)
11. "Seven and a Half Cents" (Day, Jack Straw and Ensemble)
12. "Finale"
