= Ella Sings Broadway =

Studio album by Ella Fitzgerald
- Released: 1963
- Recorded: October 1–4, 1962
- Studio: Capitol (Hollywood)
- Genre: Jazz
- Length: 34:08
- Label: Verve
- Producer: Norman Granz

Ella Fitzgerald chronology
Ella Swings Gently with Nelson (1962)	Ella Sings Broadway (1963)	Ella Fitzgerald Sings the Jerome Kern Songbook (1963)

Professional ratings
Review scores
Source	Rating
AllMusic	3/5 stars
New Record Mirror	5/5 stars
The Penguin Guide to Jazz Recordings	3/4 stars

Ella Sings Broadway is a 1963 studio album by the American jazz singer Ella Fitzgerald, with an orchestra arranged and conducted by Marty Paich. Shortly before the sessions for Ella Sings Broadway , Ella had recorded two singles with Marty Paich, the Antonio Carlos Jobim song "Desafinado" and a bossa nova version of the jazz standard "Stardust".

This album is a musical departure for Ella in many senses. As the author David Hajdu comments in his liner notes for the 2001 reissue of Ella Sings Broadway, virtually every important singer of standards recorded an album of musical-theatre songs, Sinatra with The Concert Sinatra (1963) and My Kind of Broadway (1965), Sarah Vaughan with Great Songs From Hit Shows (1958) and Doris Day with Show Time (1960).

These singers, especially Sinatra and Fitzgerald, had acquired a reputation of being consummate performers of the Great American Songbook, a songbook which by and large had been written before the outbreak of the Second World War, and which had been aped in its popularity with youth by rock and roll by the time of the Vietnam War. With many George and Ira Gershwin, Cole Porter and Irving Berlin standards having been written in the 1920s and 1930s, whilst Sinatra and Fitzgerald were growing up.

On Ella Sings Broadway, Ella connects with the Broadway songs of the previous decade and a half, vastly different in musical terms to the Great American Songbook standards from 40 years previously.

The twelve songs are from eight musicals, being;

- "Warm All Over" and "Somebody Somewhere" from Frank Loesser's The Most Happy Fella (1956)
- "If I Were a Bell" and "Guys and Dolls" from Frank Loesser's Guys and Dolls (1950)
- "Almost Like Being in Love" from Lerner and Loewe's Brigadoon (1947)
- "I Could Have Danced All Night" and "Show Me" from Lerner and Loewe's My Fair Lady (1956)
- "No Other Love" from Rodgers and Hammerstein's Me and Juliet (1953)
- "Dites-Moi" from Rodgers and Hammerstein's South Pacific (1949)
- "Hernando's Hideaway" and "Steam Heat" from Adler and Ross's Pajama Game (1954)
- "Whatever Lola Wants" from Adler and Ross's Damn Yankees (1955)

Awarded 4 stars by Down Beat jazz magazine in 1963, the review commented that it was "A perfect complement to Fitzgerald's classic series of 'Song Book' albums".

== Track listing ==
For the 1963 Verve LP release; Verve V6-4059; re-issued in 2001 on CD, Verve 549 373-2

Side One:

1. "Hernando's Hideaway" (Richard Adler, Jerry Ross) – 3:17
2. "If I Were a Bell" (Frank Loesser) – 2:22
3. "Warm All Over" (Loesser) – 2:46
4. "Almost Like Being in Love" (Alan Jay Lerner, Frederick Loewe) – 3:02
5. "Dites-Moi" (Richard Rodgers, Oscar Hammerstein II) – 2:30
6. "I Could Have Danced All Night" (Lerner, Loewe) – 2:22

Side Two:

1. "Show Me" (Lerner, Loewe) – 2:22
2. "No Other Love" (Rodgers, Hammerstein) – 2:20
3. "Steam Heat" (Adler, Ross) – 3:27
4. "Whatever Lola Wants" (Adler, Ross) – 3:13
5. "Guys and Dolls" (Loesser) – 2:21
6. "Somebody Somewhere" (Loesser) – 3:12

== Personnel ==
Recorded October 1–4, 1962, at Capitol Studios, Hollywood, Los Angeles:

- Ella Fitzgerald – vocals
- Marty Paich – arranger, conductor
- Val Valentin – engineer

Others unknown.
