= Live at the Opera House =

Live album by The Pointer Sisters
- Released: August 13, 1974
- Recorded: April 21, 1974
- Venue: San Francisco Opera House (San Francisco, California)
- Genre: R&B; soul; funk
- Label: Blue Thumb
- Producer: David Rubinson & Friends, Inc.

The Pointer Sisters chronology
That's a Plenty (1974)	Live at the Opera House (1974)	Steppin' (1975)

Professional ratings
Review scores
Source	Rating
AllMusic	4/5 stars

Live at the Opera House is the first live album released by the American vocal group The Pointer Sisters, released on the Blue Thumb label in 1974.

== History ==
The album became a milestone for the group. They became the first contemporary pop group to perform at San Francisco's Opera House. The album peaked at number 96 on the Billboard 200 and reached number 29 on the R&B albums chart. The album was remastered and issued on CD in 2006 by Hip-O Select.

== Track listing ==
Side one
No.	Title	Writer(s)	Length
1.	"Overture--Prelude to Islandia"	Tom Salisbury	7:30
2.	"Walk-On"	Salisbury	1:09
3.	"Salt Peanuts"	Bruce Good, Jeffrey Cohen / Dizzy Gillespie, Kenny Clarke	4:13
4.	"Shaky Flat Blues"	June Pointer, Anita Pointer, Bonnie Pointer	5:11
5.	"Fairytale"	A. Pointer, B. Pointer	4:27

Side two
No.	Title	Writer(s)	Length
6.	"Cloudburst"	Jon Hendricks, Leroy Kirkland, Jimmy Harris	2:49
7.	"Jada"	A. Pointer, J. Pointer, B. Pointer, Ruth Pointer / Good, Cohen	5:19
8.	"Black Coffee"	Paul Francis Webster, Sonny Burke	5:59
9.	"Let It Be Me"	Gilbert Bécaud, Mann Curtis	4:26

Side three
No.	Title	Writer(s)	Length
10.	"Hands Up" / "Wang Dang Doodle" (medley)	A. Pointer, B. Pointer, J. Pointer, R. Pointer / Willie Dixon	5:16
11.	"Old Songs" (medley) / "That's a Plenty" / "Bei Mir Bist Du Schoen"	John Shine, Bing Nathan, Good, Cohen / Ray Gilbert, Lew Pollack / Sammy Cahn, Jacob Jacobs, Saul Chaplin, Sholom Secunda	8:25
12.	"Steam Heat"	Richard Adler, Jerry Ross	4:11

Side four
No.	Title	Writer(s)	Length
13.	"Yes We Can Can"	Allen Toussaint	5:44
14.	"Love in Them There Hills"	Kenneth Gamble, Leon Huff, Roland Chambers	10:02
15.	"Walk-Off"	Salisbury	0:43

== Personnel ==
- Anita Pointer, Ruth Pointer, Bonnie Pointer, June Pointer – vocals
- Chris Michie – guitar
- Thomas P. Salisbury – piano, Hohner clavinet, organ
- John Newmann – bass
- Gaylord Birch – drums, congas

== Production ==
- David Rubinson & Friends, Inc. – producer, mix-down engineer
- Fred Catero – associate producer, recording engineer, mix-down engineer
- David Coffin, Greg Odell, Valerie Clausen, Stephen Jarvis, Ken Hopkins – recording engineers
- George Horn, Phil Brown – mastering engineer
- Tom Salisbury – conductor, arrangements
- Tom Wilkes – graphics
- Ren Deaton – photography

== Charts ==
Chart performance for Live at the Opera House
Chart (1974)	Peak position
US Billboard Top LPs & Tape	96
US Billboard Top Soul LPs	29
