= The Pajama Game (film) =

1957 film by George Abbott and Stanley Donen

- Theatrical release poster
- Directed by: George Abbott; Stanley Donen
- Screenplay by: George Abbott; Richard Bissell
- Based on: The Pajama Game by: George Abbott; Richard Bissell
- Produced by: George Abbott; Stanley Donen
- Starring: Doris Day; John Raitt; Carol Haney; Eddie Foy Jr.; Reta Shaw; Barbara Nichols
- Cinematography: Harry Stradling
- Edited by: William Ziegler
- Music by: Richard Adler; Jerry Ross
- Production company: Warner Bros. Pictures
- Distributed by: Warner Bros. Pictures
- Release date: August 29, 1957
- Running time: 101 minutes
- Country: United States
- Language: English
- Box office: $2.5 million (US and Canada rentals)

The Pajama Game is a 1957 American musical romantic comedy film based on the 1954 Broadway musical of the same name, itself based on the 1953 novel 7½ Cents by Richard Bissell. The film was produced and directed by George Abbott and Stanley Donen, with most Broadway cast members repeating their roles in the film with the notable exception of star Doris Day. The choreography is by Bob Fosse, who also staged the dances for the Broadway production.

== Plot ==
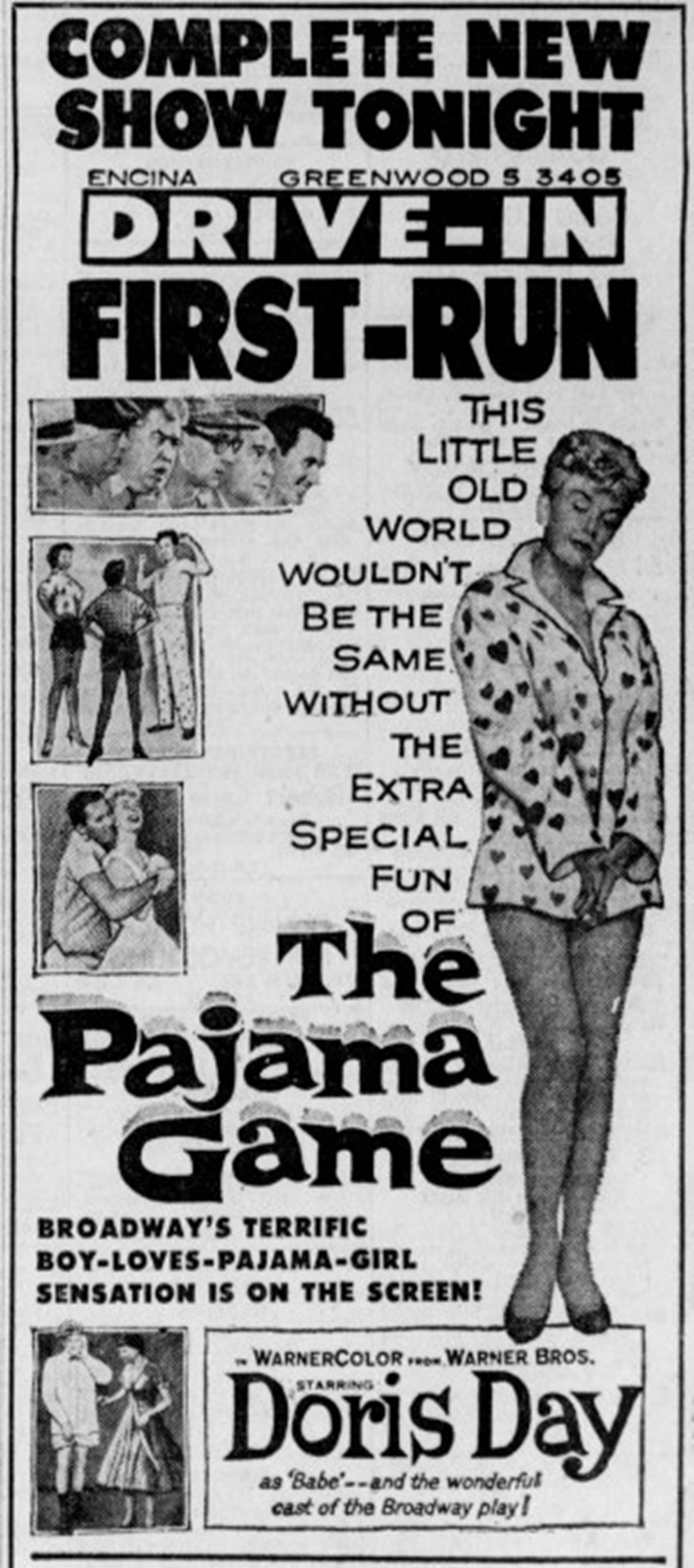
Drive-in advertisement from 1957

Sid Sorokin has just been hired as superintendent of the Sleeptite Pajama Factory in Cedar Rapids, Iowa, where the union is pushing for a raise of seven-and-a-half cents per hour to bring them in line with the industry standard ("The Pajama Game"). The factory's owner, Mr. Hasler, opposes the raise.

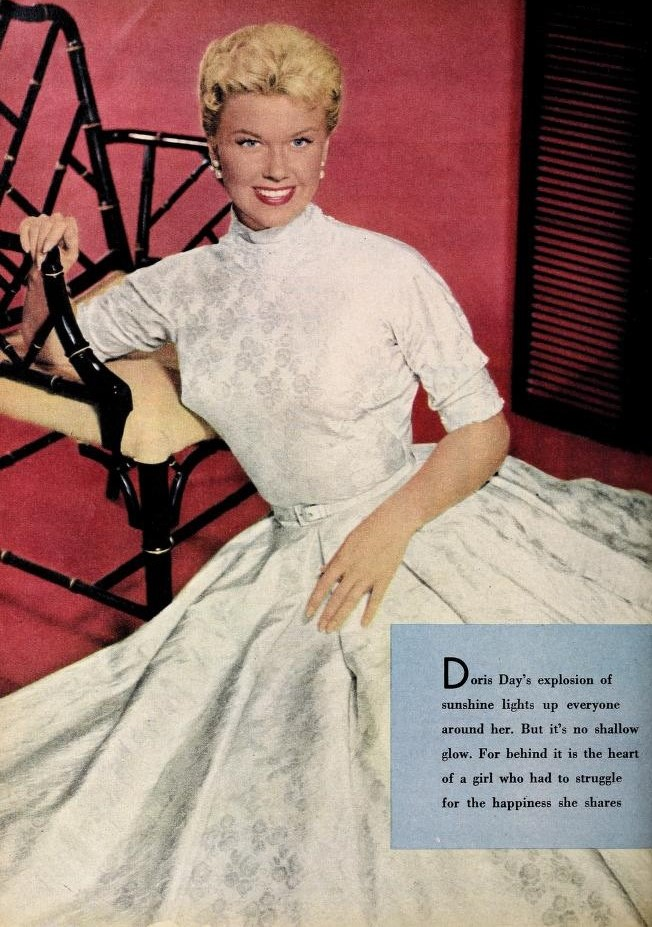
Doris Day plays Babe Williams, chair of the Grievance Committee at the Sleeptite Pajama Factory.

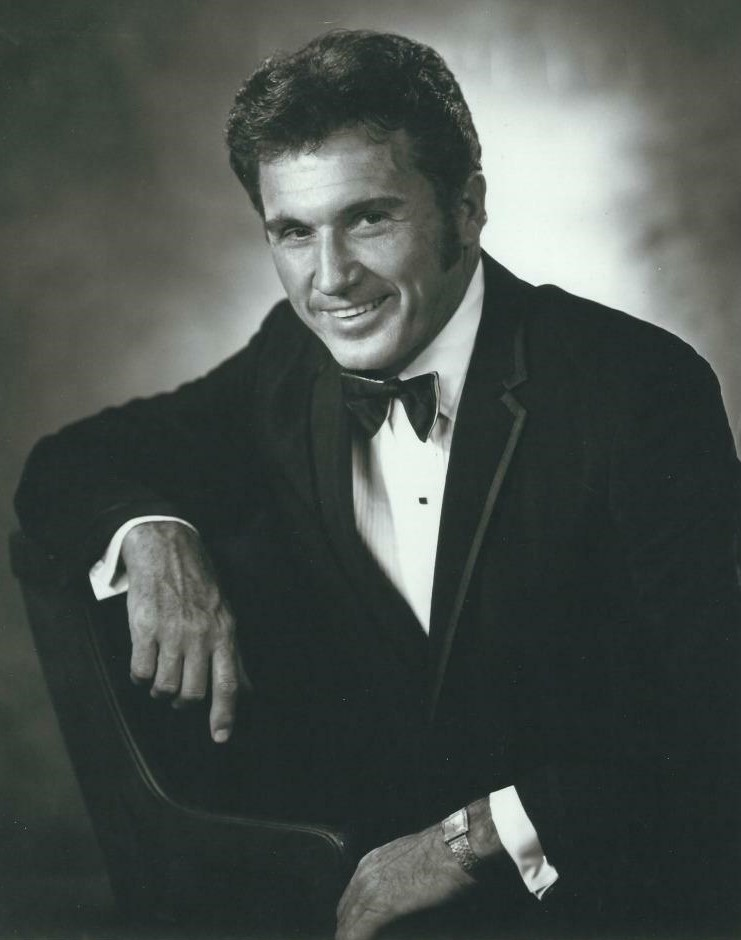
John Raitt plays Sid Sorokin, the newly hired superintendent of the Sleeptite Pajama Factory.

Impatient to improve efficiency amid employee slackness ("Racing with the Clock"), Sid shoves a dawdling employee, who reports Sid to the Grievance Committee, claiming that Sid assaulted him. When Catherine "Babe" Williams, a factory worker and chair of the Grievance Committee, comes to investigate the claims of abuse, Sid does not take her seriously, though he becomes smitten with her. Babe instructs the employee to have the nurse examine him and send her a report. Babe later dismisses the matter as an exaggeration by the employee. The female employees mock Babe's changed attitude, accusing her of being infatuated with Sid, which Babe denies ("I'm Not at All in Love").

Meanwhile, the factory's "time study man", Vernon "Hinesie" Hines, is unable to overcome his suspicions that his girlfriend Gladys, Hasler's secretary, is unfaithful to him. Mabel, Sid's secretary, presents various seemingly compromising but innocent scenarios to Hinesie to convince him that he must learn to trust his girlfriend ("I'll Never Be Jealous Again").

Sid complains that Babe keeps her distance and asks her out on a date, but she declines, insisting that they keep their relationship strictly professional. Sid counsels himself to forget about his attraction to Babe ("Hey There"). At the annual company picnic ("Once-a-Year-Day"), Babe volunteers to have an apple knocked off her head as part of Hinesie's knife-throwing act, which results in a near miss. Sid intervenes and takes her for a walk, during which they kiss and become a couple.

That night at Babe's house, Sid professes his love for Babe ("Small Talk"), but she worries that their roles in management and labor will drive them apart. She warns him that she will be fighting hard for the union during the upcoming negotiations for the seven-and-a-half-cent raise. Nevertheless, Babe declares that she returns his love and they both are jubilant ("There Once Was a Man").

The union leaders instruct the workers to stage a slowdown of work ("Racing with the Clock" reprise). Babe deliberately sabotages the machinery, prompting Sid to fire her, though she continues to work on behalf of the union.

Union workers hold a meeting on how to proceed ("Steam Heat"). They decide on more indirect sabotage, such as mismatching pajama pieces and improperly sewing on buttons. Sid visits Babe at home to convince her that their relationship can continue even if she no longer works at the factory. Sid admits that he bluffed his way into the top management job, having just been a cutting room foreman previously, and insists he needs to keep his job. Babe remains determined to fight for the union and tries to talk herself out of her feelings for Sid ("Hey There" reprise).

Hoping to uncover Hasler's secrets, Sid takes Gladys on a date to the local hot spot ("Hernando's Hideaway"). In her drunken state, Gladys lends Sid the key to the locked account book. The next day, an increasingly jealous Hinesie chases Gladys through the factory with a knife. As she seeks refuge in Sid's office, Hinesie flings knives past Sid and Gladys.

Sid confronts Hasler with the knowledge that he has already added the seven-and-a-half-cent raise to the production costs and has been pocketing the difference himself for the last six months. Sid threatens to send the account book to the board of directors if the raise is not paid immediately.

At a union rally that evening, amid talk of a strike ("7½ Cents"), Sid arrives with Hasler, who announces he will approve the raise as long as the workers do not seek retroactive pay. As the workers celebrate their victory, Babe and Sid reconcile. Some time later, the Sleeptite employees organize a pajama fashion show, with Babe and Sid, now married, sharing a single set of pajamas, Babe wearing the top and Sid the bottoms.

== Cast ==
- Doris Day as Katherine "Babe" Williams
- John Raitt as Sid Sorokin
- Carol Haney as Gladys Hotchkiss
- Eddie Foy Jr. as Vernon "Hinesie" Hines
- Reta Shaw as Mabel
- Barbara Nichols as "Poopsie"
- Thelma Pelish as Mae
- Jack Straw as Prez
- Ralph Dunn as Myron Hasler
- Owen Martin as Max
- Jackie Kelk as First Helper
- Ralph Chambers as Charlie
- Mary Stanton as Brenda
- Buzz Miller and Kenneth LeRoy dance "Steam Heat"

== Production ==
The principal cast of the Broadway musical repeated their roles for the movie, with the exception of Janis Paige, whose role is played by Doris Day; and Stanley Prager, whose role is played by Jack Straw.

As recounted in 2016 by Paige, the studio desired to use as many members of the Broadway cast as possible. But one of the leads had to be a movie star. She said that the male lead, played by Raitt, was originally offered to Frank Sinatra. Had he accepted the role, Paige said, she would have played the part that was given to Doris Day.

== Songs ==
1. "The Pajama Game" – Hines and Ensemble
2. "Racing with the Clock" – Ensemble
3. "I'm Not at All in Love" – Babe and Ensemble
4. "I'll Never Be Jealous Again" – Hines and Mabel
5. "Hey There" – Sid
6. "Once-a-Year-Day" – Babe, Sid, and Ensemble
7. "Small Talk" – Babe and Sid
8. "There Once Was a Man" – Babe and Sid
9. "Racing with the Clock" (reprise) – Ensemble
10. "Steam Heat" – Gladys
11. "Hey There" (reprise) – Babe
12. "Hernando's Hideaway" – Gladys and Ensemble
13. "7½ Cents" – Babe, Prez, and Ensemble

== Reception ==
On the review aggregator website Rotten Tomatoes, the film holds an approval rating of 81% based on 16 reviews.

At the time of its release, it received a favorable review by Bosley Crowther of The New York Times. He compared the film favorably to the Broadway stage version, and said the film is "as good as it was on the stage, which was quite good enough for many thousand happy customers over a period of a couple of years. It is fresh, funny, lively and tuneful. Indeed, in certain respects—such as when they all go on the factory picnic—it is even more lively than it was on the stage."

== Unproduced remake ==
In October 1992, it was announced Warner Bros. had secured the rights to The Pajama Game for a new version to be developed by John Hughes as writer, director, and producer. The project never came to fruition.

== See also ==
- List of American films of 1957
- The Pajama Game (album)
