= That's a Plenty (album) =

Studio album by the Pointer Sisters
- Released: February 13, 1974
- Studios: Wally Hedier (San Francisco); Quadraphonic (Nashville, Tennessee); United Western (Los Angeles)
- Genres: R&B; soul; funk; jazz; big band; country
- Length: 48:25
- Label: Blue Thumb
- Producers: David Rubinson & Friends, Inc.

The Pointer Sisters chronology
The Pointer Sisters (1973)	That's a Plenty (1974)	Live at the Opera House (1974)

Singles from That's a Plenty
- 1. "Fairytale" Released: June 1974

Professional ratings
Review scores
Source	Rating
AllMusic	4/5 stars
The Encyclopedia of Popular Music	2/5 stars
The New Rolling Stone Record Guide	2/5 stars

That's a Plenty is the second studio album by the American female vocal group the Pointer Sisters. It was released in 1974 on Blue Thumb Records.

The album peaked at No. 82 on the Billboard 200.

== History ==
Mixing the Pointers' brand of soul with rollicking blues numbers and jazz covers, the album also included the country-flavored "Fairytale", their second Top 40 hit. The song crossed over to the country charts, enabling the group to become the first African-American vocal group to perform at the Grand Ole Opry. The group won the Grammy Award for "Best Country Vocal Performance by a Duo or Group with Vocal".

It wouldn't be until Beyoncé, 50 years later, in 2025 that another black woman would win in The Country Category.

The album was the second by the group to be certified gold. The album was remastered and issued on CD in 2006 by Hip-O Select.

== Track listing ==
Side one
No.	Title	Writer(s)	Length
1.	"Bangin' on the Pipes" / "Steam Heat" (Medley)	Bruce Good, Jeffrey Cohen / Richard Adler, Jerry Ross	5:39
2.	"Salt Peanuts"	Good, Cohen / Dizzy Gillespie, Kenny Clarke	5:10
3.	"Grinning in Your Face"	Son House	4:49
4.	"Shaky Flat Blues"	June Pointer, Anita Pointer, Bonnie Pointer	4:41
5.	"That's a Plenty" / "Surfeit, U.S.A." (Medley)	Ray Gilbert, Lew Pollack / Good, Cohen	3:42

Side two
No.	Title	Writer(s)	Length
1.	"Little Pony"	Neal Hefti, Jon Hendricks, Dave Lambert	4:43
2.	"Fairytale"	A. Pointer, B. Pointer	5:04
3.	"Black Coffee"	Paul Francis Webster, Sonny Burke	6:07
4.	"Love in Them There Hills"	Kenneth Gamble, Leon Huff, Roland Chambers	8:30

== Personnel ==
- Anita Pointer, Ruth Pointer, Bonnie Pointer, June Pointer – vocals

Musicians

- Tom Salisbury – keyboards, Silverton accordion (1), brass and string arrangements
- Herbie Hancock – acoustic piano (2, 6); electric piano, Hohner clavinet and ARP synthesizer (9)
- David Briggs – acoustic piano (7)
- David Grisman – mandolin (1)
- Jesse Ed Davis – electric guitar (3)
- Jack Viertell – electric guitar (3)
- Bonnie Raitt – slide guitar (3)
- John Shine – guitar (4)
- Bobby Thompson – acoustic guitar (7)
- Weldon Myrick – pedal steel guitar (7)
- John Neumann – bass (1, 5, 8)
- Ron McClure – bass (2, 4, 6)
- Paul Jackson – bass (3, 9)
- Norbert Putnam – bass (7)
- Gaylord Birch – drums (1−6, 8, 9)
- Ken Buttrey – drums (7)
- Bill Summers – African talking drum, shekere and congas (9)
- Britt Woodman – trombone solo (4)
- Gordon Messick – trombone (5)
- Harry "Sweets" Edison – trumpet solo (4)
- James Goodwin – trumpet (5)
- Jim Rothermel – clarinet (5)
- Floyd Cooley – tuba (5)
- Buddy Spicher – fiddle (7)

Production

- David Rubinson & Friends, Inc. – producer
- Tom Salisbury, Jeffrey Cohen, Bruce Good – associate producers
- Jeremy Zatkin, Fred Catero, David Rubinson – recording engineers
- George Horn, Phil Brown – mastering engineers
- David Rubinson – arrangements on "Grinning in Your Face" and "Black Coffee"
- Norman Landsberg, Jeffrey Cohen, Bruce Good – vocal arrangement on "Salt Peanuts"
- Randy Tuten – cover art
- Herb Greene – art direction, photography

== Chart positions ==
Chart performance for That's a Plenty
Chart (1974)	Peak position
Australian Albums (Kent Music Report)	79
US Billboard Top LPs & Tape	82
US Billboard Top Soul LPs	33
