= Fairytale (Pointer Sisters song) =

Single by The Pointer Sisters

from the album That's a Plenty
- B-side: "Love in Them There Hills"
- Released: June 1974
- Recorded: 1974; Quadraphonic Studios, Nashville TN
- Genre: Country
- Length: 3:11
- Label: Blue Thumb
- Songwriters: Bonnie Pointer; Anita Pointer
- Producer: David Rubinson

The Pointer Sisters singles chronology
| "Steam Heat" (1974) | "Fairytale" (1974) | "Live Your Life Before You Die" (1975) |

"Fairytale" is a song introduced on the Pointer Sisters' May 1974 album release That's a Plenty; written by group members Anita Pointer and Bonnie Pointer, "Fairytale" became the second of the three Top 40 hits scored by the Pointer Sisters in their original embodiment as a quartet – Anita Pointer sang lead on all three of these hits.

== History ==
Anita Pointer has stated that she wrote this breakup song from personal experience: pre-stardom the Pointer Sisters had written and recorded radio spots, for which purpose they'd borrowed equipment from San Francisco radio station KSAN, and Anita had become romantically involved with a KSAN deejay who'd neglected to mention being married - "He lied to me so when I found out that's when that song 'came out' [ie. took shape]". "Fairytale" was written while the Pointer Sisters were on one of their earliest tours as support for Dave Mason: staying at a motel in Woodstock (NY) Anita was listening to a cassette by James Taylor – "I love him. I just think he’s so great. And I wrote Fairytale that night." At the conclusion of the tour with Mason, Anita gave what she'd written at the motel to Bonnie Pointer for polishing into the song which the Pointer Sisters recorded at Quadraphonic Studios in Nashville TN.

"Fairytale" was an extreme stylistic departure for the Pointer Sisters. The C&W- flavored song was not chosen as its parent album's advance single, that distinction being afforded in March 1974 to "Steam Heat." The latter was an exemplar of the group's typical swing era sound, but it managed to reach #108 on Billboard's Bubbling Under Chart. A June 1974 follow-up single release originally featured "Fairytale" – pared down from the 5:07 length of the album track – as the B-side to a remake of the Vibrations' 1968 R&B hit "Love in Them There Hills." However, after "Love in Them There Hills" failed to attract interest at Pop- or R&B-formatted radio stations, "Fairytale" was pitched to C&W-formatted radio stations, a left-field maneuver which paid off with a debut on the Billboard C&W chart dated July 27, 1974. As the Pointer Sisters' label Blue Thumb had no C&W division, "Fairytale" was promoted in the C&W market by ABC Dot Records which, like Blue Thumb, was part of the Famous Music group.

The Pointer Sisters began a series of promotional appearances in Nashville with an August 16, 1974 performance at Fairgrounds Speedway; on October 25, 1974, the group performed "Fairytale" at the Grand Ole Opry, marking the inaugural Opry appearance by an African-American vocal group. (The personnel for the Pointer Sisters' Opry performance – which also featured "Shaky Flat Blues" – was Anita, Ruth and Bonnie Pointer; the absence of fourth member June Pointer being attributed to physical and nervous exhaustion.) Ultimately, "Fairytale" achieved moderate C&W hit status, peaking at number 37 on the Billboard C&W chart dated October 26, 1974, but this was sufficient success to effect a crossover to Pop radio with the song debuting on the Billboard Hot 100 – dated October 5, 1974. It eventually ascended to a number 13 peak that December. Internationally "Fairytale" reached number 21 in Australia and number 42 in Canada; it also hit number 41 on the Canadian C&W chart.

The Pointer Sisters had introduced "Fairytale" in performance during their April 21, 1974 concert at the San Francisco Opera House; their live version was featured on the Live at the Opera House album released in September 1974.

Bonnie Pointer played down the idea of a C&W hit by the Pointer Sisters being a novelty: "People think because we're always trying something different we're not sincere. Like country music. For us, it's no joke...Our folks came from Arkansas and we grew up singing country songs. It's part of us."

"Fairytale" went on to win the Pointer Sisters the Best Country Vocal Performance by a Duo or Group for the year 1974, marking the first awarding of a Grammy to an all-female vocal group and making the Pointer Sisters the only black women to win a Grammy in a country music category until Beyoncé took home the Grammy Award for Best Country Album in 2025. Bonnie and Anita Pointer also received a nomination for the Grammy Award for Best Country Song as the writers of "Fairytale."

Elvis Presley recorded a cover version of the song on March 10, 1975, at RCA's Hollywood studios. The track appears on his album Today.

In December 1974, the Pointer Sisters recorded five more tracks at Quadrophonic Studios intending to complete an album of all-C&W songs. However, only one track was released: "Live Your Life Before You Die" which, upon its January 1975 single release, only became a minor Pop hit (number 89). Despite its modest chart showing, it garnered the Pointer Sisters another Best Country Group Performance Grammy nomination. Eventually, the follow-up studio album to That's a Plenty – the June 1975 release Steppin' – in fact showed the group moving in a more emphatically R&B direction.

In 1986, Anita Pointer returned to the country charts, scoring a number 2 C&W hit with Earl Thomas Conley on the duet, "Too Many Times".

== Credits ==
- Lead vocals by Anita Pointer
- Background vocals by The Pointer Sisters: Ruth Pointer, Bonnie Pointer and June Pointer
- Produced by David Rubinson and written by Anita and Bonnie Pointer

== Charts ==
| Chart (1974–75) | Peak position |
|---|---|
| Australia (Kent Music Report) | 30 |
| Canada (RPM) Top Singles | 42 |
| Canada RPM Adult Contemporary | 27 |
| U.S. Billboard Hot 100 | 13 |
| U.S. Billboard Adult Contemporary | 13 |
| U.S. Billboard Hot Country Singles | 37 |
