= The Pajama Game (disambiguation) =

The Pajama Game is a Broadway musical.

"The Pajama Game" may also refer to:

- The Pajama Game (film), a 1957 movie based on the Broadway musical
- The Pajama Game (album), a 1957 Doris Day album based on the movie
- The Pajama Game cast recording, the 2006 Broadway cast recording from The Pajama Game, disc one on Harry Connick, Jr.'s album Harry on Broadway, Act I
