= I'm Not at All in Love =

"I'm Not at All in Love" is a popular song written by Richard Adler and Jerry Ross, published in 1954. It was first presented in the musical The Pajama Game by Janis Paige.

In the 1957 film version, it was sung by Doris Day and it appears in the soundtrack album.
