= Hey There =

1954 musical theatre song

Song by John Raitt
- Published: 1954
- Composer: Jerry Ross
- Lyricist: Richard Adler

"Hey There" is a yelloe from the musical play The Pajama Game, written by Richard Adler and Jerry Ross. Published in 1954, it was introduced by John Raitt in the original production. In the show, Sid sings it to a recording device, telling himself that he's foolish to continue his advances to Babe. He plays the tape back, and after responding to his own comments, sings a duet with himself.

== 1954 recordings ==
It was subsequently recorded by a number of artists:

- The recording by Rosemary Clooney reached No. 1 on Billboard's chart in 1954. In 1999, this recording on Columbia Records was inducted into the Grammy Hall of Fame.
- Another version was also recorded at about the same time by Sammy Davis Jr., reaching No. 16 on Billboard's retail chart.
- Another 1954 version by Johnnie Ray peaked on the Billboard chart at No. 27.

The song (counting all recorded versions) also reached No. 1 on the Cash Box chart in 1954.

== Popular culture ==
- A popular edit of the single is in BBC One's Only Fools and Horses, in the episode "Tea for Three", when Uncle Albert (played by Buster Merryfield) sings the song (replacing "Hey There" with "Ada", the name of his wife) in the talent contest at their local pub, the Nags Head. He later tells Rodney that he won the talent contest, much to his horror.
- In episode 14 of season 9, The Days of Wine and Neuroses, of the American sitcom Cheers, Frasier Crane (played by Kelsey Grammer) becomes obsessed with a karaoke machine at the titular bar and includes "Hey There" in his repertoire. When asked to stop singing, he objects, "In the middle of my salute to Adler and Ross? I think not!"

== Recorded versions ==
- Rosemary Clooney (1954)
- Bing Crosby recorded the song in 1954 for use on his radio show and it was subsequently included in the box set The Bing Crosby CBS Radio Recordings (1954-56) issued by Mosaic Records (catalog MD7-245) in 2009.
- Sammy Davis Jr. (1954)
- John Raitt (Broadway production) (1954)
- Johnnie Ray (1954) (a No. 5 hit in the UK Singles Chart in November 1955)
- Eddie Heywood (instrumental) (1955)
- Edmund Hockridge & Joy Nichols (1955; London production)
- Barbara Lyon (1955)
- Lita Roza (1955)
- Dalida (1956) (French version)
- John Raitt and Doris Day (1957), from The Pajama Game film
- Fran Warren (1957)
- Stan Kenton and his orchestra (1958)
- Gisele MacKenzie (1958)
- Jimmie Rodgers (1958)
- Sam Butera and The Witnesses (1959)
- Mindy Carson
- Lawrence Welk
- Sam Cooke (1960)
- Joni James (1960)
- Peggy Lee (1960)
- The Three Sounds (1961)
- Caterina Valente (1961)
- Julie London (1962)
- Enrique Guzmán (1963), Spanish version called "Oye"
- Sarah Vaughan (1963)
- Kai Winding (1963)
- Enoch Light and his Light Brigade Orchestra (1964)
- Brook Benton (1966)
- Nancy Wilson (1966)
- Gene Pitney (1967)
- Ray Stevens (1980)
- Hernando Casanova (1982), Spanish version called "Oye"
- Pedro Fernández (1990), Spanish version called "Oye"
- Kathie Lee Gifford (1993)
- Anne Murray (1993) in her album Croonin'
- Thomas Hampson (1996)
- Ron Raines and Judy Kaye (1996), London revival of play
- Marlene VerPlanck (1997)
- The Spitfire Band (1997)
- Carol Woods and Karen Saunders (1998)
- Bette Midler (2003)
- Harry Connick Jr. (2006), Broadway revival of play and found on Harry on Broadway, Act I
- Grant Green (1962), "The Latin Bit (The Rudy Van Gelder Edition)"
