= Somebody Somewhere (1956 song) =

Song by Frank Loesser

"Somebody, Somewhere" is a popular song written by Frank Loesser. The song was published in 1956 as part of Loesser's musical, The Most Happy Fella, where it was introduced by Jo Sullivan Loesser.

== Recordings ==
- Doris Day, for the EP Hits from 'The Most Happy Fella' (1956).
- Jo Sullivan Loesser, Original cast recording of The Most Happy Fella, 1956.
- Ella Fitzgerald on Ella Sings Broadway, 1963.
- Sergio Franchi on 1963 RCA Victor Red Seal album, Broadway, I Love You.
- Esther Ofarim on 1965 album Is It Really Me?; now 2006 CD, In New York with Bobby Scott & His Orchestra.
- Sophie Hayden, cast recording of Broadway revival of The Most Happy Fella, 1992.
- Jo Sullivan Loesser, Emily Loesser, and Don Stephenson on Loesser by Loesser, 1992.
- Liz Callaway on Anywhere I Wander: Liz Callaway Sings Frank Loesser, 1993.
- Rebecca Kilgore and Dave Frishberg on Why Fight the Feeling: Songs By Frank Loesser, 2008.
