= The Joker Is Wild =

1957 American biographical film

- Theatrical release poster
- Directed by: Charles Vidor
- Screenplay by: Oscar Saul
- Based on: The Joker Is Wild: The Story of Joe E. Lewis by Art Cohn
- Produced by: Samuel J. Briskin
- Starring: Frank Sinatra; Mitzi Gaynor; Jeanne Crain; Eddie Albert
- Cinematography: Daniel L. Fapp
- Edited by: Everett Douglas
- Music by: Walter Scharf
- Production company: Paramount Pictures
- Distributed by: Paramount Pictures
- Release date: September 26, 1957 (USA)
- Running time: 126 minutes
- Country: United States
- Language: English
- Budget: $2.4 million
- Box office: $3 million (US and Canadian rentals)

The Joker Is Wild is a 1957 American musical drama film directed by Charles Vidor, starring Frank Sinatra, Mitzi Gaynor, Jeanne Crain and Eddie Albert, and released by Paramount Pictures. The VistaVision film is about Joe E. Lewis, the popular singer and comedian who was a major attraction in nightclubs from the 1920s to the early 1950s.

== Plot ==
In 1929, Joe E. Lewis is a successful nightclub singer in Chicago while working for the Mob during the Prohibition era. His decision to work elsewhere displeases his Mob employer, who has his thugs assault him by slashing his face and throat, preventing him from continuing his career as a singer.

After many years, he eventually recovers and turns his acerbic and witty sense of humor into an act, when given a break as a stand-up comedian from singer Sophie Tucker. Soon, Lewis makes a career as a comic, but heavy drinking and self-destructive behavior lead him to question what his life has become and how he has hurt the people around him, including his wife Martha and his best friend Austin.

== Cast ==
- Frank Sinatra as Joe E. Lewis
- Mitzi Gaynor as Martha Stewart
- Jeanne Crain as Letty Page
- Eddie Albert as Austin "Mr" Mack (real name of Lewis's long-time piano accompanist)
- Beverly Garland as Cassie Mack
- Jackie Coogan as Swifty Morgan (real name of Lewis's uncle)
- Barry Kelley as Captain Hugh McCarthy
- Ted de Corsia as Georgie Parker
- Leonard Graves as Tim Coogan
- Valerie Allen as Flora, Chorine
- Hank Henry as Burlesque Comedian
- Sophie Tucker as herself (in last feature film appearance)
- Bill Hickman as hood with knife who attacks Lewis offscreen (uncredited)

== Production ==
Sinatra read Art Cohn's book The Joker Is Wild: The Story of Joe E. Lewis in the mid-1950s, was immediately taken by the story, and bought the rights to the book after Lewis turned down a reported $150,000 from Metro-Goldwyn-Mayer for the film rights. Variety reported in November 1955 that Paramount Pictures would finance an independent feature film that was headed by Lewis and Sinatra, along with director Charles Vidor and author Art Cohn. The New York Times reported that Sinatra's share was in the region of $125,000, along with 25-percent of the film's profits.

The filming was done mostly later in the day, as Sinatra preferred to work at that time. Sinatra also insisted that all the musical scenes and songs be recorded live on set to keep the performances more genuine. Sinatra stated, "When I do a concert and someone coughs, I like that. I like the scraping of chairs. You get the feeling that it's really happening. I've always thought Lewis was one of only about four or five great artists in this century—one of them was Jolson—and I remember him screaming like the devil when he made a soundtrack." (from All the Way: A Biography of Frank Sinatra)

== Critical reception ==
The Joker Is Wild opened to mostly favorable reviews.

Los Angeles Times reviewer Phillip K. Scheuer wrote, "[Sinatra] catches the bitter inner restlessness almost too well ... When Lewis, highball in hand, is reciting them [the drunk monologues] his natural clown's grin takes the curse off their cynicism; from Sinatra the gags come out bitter and barbed."

Films and Filming reviewer Gordon Gow stated, "One consolation in the glossy gloom of this downbeat drama is that Frank Sinatra has sufficient talent and taste to break through the wall of embarrassment that is bound to arise between an audience and the film case-history of an unanonymous alcoholic."

Variety commented on the "major job Sinatra does ... alternately sympathetic and pathetic, funny and sad".

This movie won the 1957 Academy Award for Best Original Song, for "All the Way", by Jimmy Van Heusen and Sammy Cahn in an oft-reprised arrangement from Nelson Riddle. When the film was re-released some years later, its title was changed for a period to All the Way, due to the immense popularity of the film's theme song, which peaked at number 2 in Billboard.

On Lewis's 1961 comedy album, It Is Now Post Time, he discusses his thoughts on the film:

Sinatra did my life story, ladies and gentlemen, in a picture called The Joker Is Wild. And those of you who saw the picture, it wasn't my true story. Paramount couldn't get a liquor licence. But it was a good picture ... There were two girls in the picture, Jeanne Crain and Mitzi Gaynor. They were supposed to be in love with me in my early days of vaudeville. And I must have been stiff—I can't remember these broads at all. But they were in love with me throughout the picture, and sometimes I think Sinatra had more fun playing my life than I had living it. But that's the way the Pepsi pops, you know.

== See also ==
- List of American films of 1957
