= Victory at Sea =

American documentary television series

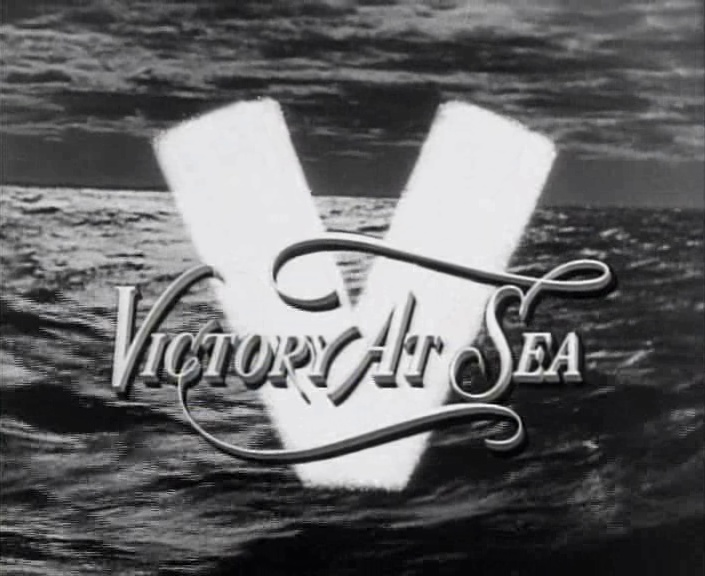
- Title screen
- Genre: Documentary
- Narrated by: Leonard Graves
- Music by: NBC Symphony Orchestra
- Composers: Richard Rodgers; Robert Russell Bennett
- Country of origin: United States
- Original language: English
- No. of episodes: 26 (list of episodes)

Production
- Producer: Henry Salomon
- Running time: 30 minutes
- Production company: NBC Television Network

Original release
- Network: NBC
- Release: October 26, 1952 – May 3, 1953

Victory at Sea is a documentary television series about warfare in general during World War II, and naval warfare in particular, as well as the use of industry in warfare. It was broadcast by NBC in the United States during 1952–53. It was condensed into a film released in 1954. Excerpts from the music soundtrack, by Richard Rodgers and Robert Russell Bennett, were re-recorded for record albums. The original TV broadcasts comprised 26 half-hour segments—Sunday afternoons at 3:00 p.m. (EST) in most markets—starting on October 26, 1952, and ending on May 3, 1953. The series won an Emmy award in 1954 as "best public affairs program" and played an important part in establishing historic "compilation" documentaries as a television genre.

== History ==
The project was conceived by Henry Salomon, who, while a U.S. Navy Lieutenant Commander during World War II, was a research assistant to historian Samuel Eliot Morison. Morison was then writing the 15-volume History of United States Naval Operations in World War II. Salomon learned of the large amounts of film that the opposing navies had compiled. Salomon left the Navy in 1948 and eventually discussed his idea of a documentary series with one of his Phillips Academy and Harvard classmates, Robert Sarnoff, a rising executive at NBC television and the son of David Sarnoff, the chairman of RCA (then the owner of NBC). It was Robert Sarnoff who championed Salomon's proposal, won its approval and saw it through to completion.

NBC approved the project in 1951, with Salomon as producer and a budget of $500,000 (large for that era). His team, composed largely of newsreel veterans, searched naval archives around the world and received cooperation from the U.S. Navy, which recognized the publicity value. Salomon's team compiled 60,000,000 ft (11,000 mi) of film, which was edited to about 61,000 ft (11.6 mi) for broadcast.

After the first run, NBC syndicated it to local stations, where it proved successful financially through the mid-1960s. NBC also marketed the series overseas; by 1964, it had been broadcast in forty foreign markets. NBC created a feature-length (89-minute) motion picture condensation. The feature-length version was narrated by Alexander Scourby who replaced Leonard Graves, the narrator of the 26-part series. NBC made a distribution deal with United Artists and the film debuted in mid-1954. NBC also prepared another, 79-minute, condensation for broadcast and it debuted on December 29, 1960, in a 90-minute evening slot as part of NBC's Project 20 ("Project XX") series, which itself was established in 1955 as an offshoot of original Victory at Sea production unit.

== Awards ==
Victory at Sea won many honors, including:

- a 1953 Emmy nomination for Best Public Affairs Program
- a 1954 Emmy award for Best Public Affairs Program
- a 1953 Peabody award.
- the Freedoms Foundation's George Washington Medal.

== Music ==
Salomon also signed Richard Rodgers, fresh off several successful Broadway musicals, to compose the musical score. Rodgers contributed 12 "themes"—short piano compositions a minute or two in length; these may be examined in the Rodgers Collection at the Library of Congress. Robert Russell Bennett did the orchestrating, transforming Rodgers's themes for a variety of moods, and composing much more original material than Rodgers, as may be observed in Bennett's holograph scores, archived with his papers at Northwestern University and microfilmed at the Library of Congress. Episode No. 18, for example, is entirely of Bennett's creation, and uses none of Rodgers's twelve themes. Bennett nonetheless received credit only for arranging the score and conducting NBC Symphony Orchestra members on the soundtrack recording sessions, and many writers still refer erroneously to "Rodgers's thirteen-hour score". In 1954, Rodgers recorded the VAS "Symphonic Scenario" medley (scored by Bennett) with the New York Philharmonic for Columbia Records, but it was Bennett who conducted the much more familiar RCA Victor recordings—the first (1953) with NBC Symphony Orchestra musicians who played for the soundtrack sessions, and later with members of the Symphony of the Air, an orchestra created in the autumn of 1954 from former NBC Symphony members, identified on the albums as the RCA Victor Symphony Orchestra.

RCA has released and reissued the Rodgers-Bennett musical score several times on LP and CD. The listing below is based on the 1992 RCA remastered recordings titled Victory at Sea (13 tracks) and More Victory at Sea (11 tracks). Selections from More Victory at Sea are marked by an asterisk (*). Note that the More Victory at Sea album also includes "Special Effect Battle Sounds" as part of many of the tracks.

The movements and approximate timings in the RCA Victor Symphony performance are as follows:

1. The Song of the High Seas – 5:02
2. The Pacific Boils Over – 5:43
3. Fire on the Waters – 5:58
4. Guadalcanal March – 3:07
5. Pelelieu* – 3:37
6. Theme of the Fast Carriers – 6:44
7. Hard Work and Horseplay – 3:46
8. Mare Nostrum – 4:29
9. Beneath the Southern Cross – 4:04
10. Mediterranean Mosaic – 5:52
11. Allies on the March* – 5:15
12. D-Day – 5:55
13. The Sound of Victory* – 6:12
14. Victory at Sea – 6:14
15. Voyage into Fate* – 6:20
16. Rings Around Rabaul* – 6:06
17. Full Fathom Five* – 7:08
18. The Turkey Shoot* – 5:18
19. Ships That Pass* – 4:53
20. Two If By Sea* – 6:27
21. The Turning Point* – 5:24
22. Symphonic Scenario* – 10:34
23. Danger Down Deep – 4:53
24. The Magnetic North – 5:45

The score was a favorite of U.S. President Richard Nixon, who was a Navy veteran himself, and part of it was played at his funeral. Additionally, Volume 1 of the score won "Best Engineering Contribution - Classical Recording" at the 2nd Annual Grammy Awards in 1960. The category has since been renamed "Best Engineered Album, Classical."

Rodgers's "Beneath the Southern Cross" theme was given words by Oscar Hammerstein, titled "No Other Love", and put into their 1953 musical, Me and Juliet. The May 1953 recording by RCA Victor recording artist Perry Como became a "Number One" hit on the pop charts later that year.

== Home media ==
Though the original series Victory at Sea is in the public domain because its copyright was never renewed, the copyright on the original musical score was renewed and thus only the music remains under copyright. Victory at Sea has been released on VHS, Betamax, CED, LaserDisc, DVD and Blu-ray. These include both unofficial and official releases. Embassy Home Entertainment produced the VHS, Betamax, and LaserDisc versions. Newer releases include a DVD set from The History Channel/New Video under license from NBC News. In 2010, Periscope Film released the program as a three-disc Blu-ray set. The Periscope Film release is in true 24p high definition and includes commentary tracks by film historian Peter C. Rollins. In 2012, Mill Creek Entertainment marketed the 26-episode series on two DVDs and a bonus disc running over 16 hours. The music soundtrack, originally released as an LP record, has been remastered and released on compact disc. The soundtrack has separate copyright limitations pertaining to the Rodgers and Hammerstein organization.

== Episode list ==
Ep. #	Original air date	Title (with link to full video)	General topic(s)	Synopsis
1.	October 26, 1952	"Design for War"	Battle of the Atlantic, 1939–1941	World War II begins with the Germans invading Poland and France. But German forces are restrained by the British thanks to the vital convoys, Canadian and American naval forces' initial involvement and the Lend-Lease program. Still, the German submarine war increases its crescendo thanks to new French bases.
2.	November 2, 1952	"The Pacific Boils Over"	Pearl Harbor, December 7, 1941	Using Japanese footage, viewers see the planning, execution and, ultimately, the celebration of the country's attack on Pearl Harbor. There also is an explanation provided for the attack and some peaceful moments depicted among the US sailors before the attack. Though damaged, the US Navy survives to fight again. (This episode was re-broadcast on December 7, 1952—the anniversary of the attack.)
3.	November 9, 1952	"Sealing the Breach"	Anti-submarine warfare, 1941–1943	With war now declared by the US, naval forces join to bring convoys of supplies across the Atlantic Ocean to the Allies in England. German U-Boats come through and manage to destroy some of ships along the way. Still, the Americans are resilient.
4.	November 23, 1952	"Midway Is East"	Japanese victories and the Battle of Midway	The Japanese are ascendant as they invade the East Indies, Singapore and the Philippines. But the Americans are victorious, first on the Coral Sea and ultimately on Midway as they manage to bomb and sink four of Japan's aircraft carriers—the same ones that were used for the attack on Pearl Harbor—making the imperial fleet retreat and giving the US an early victory in the Pacific.
5.	November 30, 1952	"Mediterranean Mosaic"	Gibraltar, Allied and enemy fleets, Malta	World War II comes to the Mediterranean Sea as Italian, French and British naval forces struggle. British forces have the unenviable position of guarding the sea as they escort convoys from Gibraltar to Malta. Still, they have their relaxing moments, especially the daily mealtimes: Morning cocoa, breakfast, dinner, tea, and supper. Meanwhile, the German Luftwaffe attacks Malta, but the Maltese remain determined to keep fighting. Their heroism is rewarded when King George VI pays a later visit to the island, reviving their spirits.
6.	December 14, 1952	"Guadalcanal"	Guadalcanal	After training in Australia and New Zealand, the US Marines land on Guadalcanal. The US Navy suffers defeats by the Japanese Navy around the island—in an area called Ironbottom Sound. Essential information is conveyed about how some deaths are caused not just by battle but also by malaria. The number of people dying on both sides is emphasized here as an example of endurance. Meanwhile, to the tune of Richard Rodgers' most famous march from the series, America's men and materiel are mobilized against the ultimate struggle that is World War II.
7.	December 21, 1952	"Rings Around Rabaul"	Struggle for the Solomon Islands	The Japanese Navy is ascendant in its conquests, of which its main base is on Rabaul in the New Britain Islands. This episode refers to the US strategy of surrounding and strangling the Japanese base in the autumn of 1943 through invasions of its surrounding islands (Bougainville, Rendova). Praise is given to the "Seabees", who made the airfields operational in a brief time, and to observation planes and radar, which helped the US Navy stop Japanese reinforcements and counterattacks.
8.	December 28, 1952	"Mare Nostrum"	Mediterranean Theater, 1940–1942	Mussolini calls the Mediterranean mare nostrum ("our sea") and seeks to exploit it. British and Greek military forces, however, defeat the Italians, forcing the Germans to send the Afrika Korps. But it is the sea battles to control the Mediterranean that is the crux. At issue is who controls the Suez Canal in Egypt. Eventually, the Allies triumph, and proceeded to destroy the Germans in the desert.
9.	January 4, 1953	"Sea and Sand"	Invasion of North Africa, 1942–1943	The USSR government demands a "second front" as their country struggles against the Germans. The wish is granted as Roosevelt and Churchill in Washington agree on the first invasion of North Africa against General Rommel's forces via Operation Torch, while the Allies also neutralize many of the Axis' Mediterranean supply bases. Eventually, the Germans counterattack, but to no avail.
10.	January 11, 1953	"Beneath the Southern Cross"	War in the south Atlantic	The South Atlantic becomes a front in the overall Battle of the Atlantic, from the pursuit of the German ship Graf Spee to the battle between HMS Devonshire and the German raider Atlantis. The Allies, meanwhile, nurture their relations with South America and gain a vital base in Ascension Island. Despite sympathy for the Nazis, South American nations rally to the Allies' cause, securing vital bases, forces and resources.
11.	January 18, 1953	"The Magnetic North"	War from Murmansk to Alaska	This episode of Victory at Sea explores the battles between the Allies and Germans near the Arctic Circle, and the convoys battling past German-occupied Norway to Russia. Meanwhile, the Japanese invade Alaska unsuccessfully, and the US Navy again is ordered to guard this vital area amidst the harsh climate and vast vistas.
12.	January 25, 1953	"The Conquest of Micronesia"	Carrier warfare and the Gilberts and Marshalls	The aircraft carriers of the US Navy attack in the Central Pacific Ocean at the Gilbert and Marshall Islands, destroying Japanese installations. But for all of these, there is a price to pay for victory.
13.	February 1, 1953	"Melanesian Nightmare"	New Guinea campaign	The Allies are victorious in New Guinea as they repel the Japanese. They thus bring the fight through a series of "island-hopping" offensives using a new ship—the slow but vital LST. The price paid is great on both sides, but as Japanese casualties increase in their never-ending losing battle against the Allied onslaught, their homeland only hears news of their victory being broadcast by radio. Japan's people are shown suffering in defeat through a scene of a massive funeral, providing a balance of how universal grief truly is.
14.	February 8, 1953	"Roman Renaissance"	Sicily and the Italian campaign	While Hitler's Germany begins its decline, Mussolini's Italy falls. Eventually, as Naples and Rome are bombed, the Italians surrender. But there is still a slow campaign (Salerno, Cassino, Anzio) until victory is achieved by the liberation of Roma, where Romans celebrate freedom waving American flags, and the Pope addressing the audience.
15.	February 15, 1953	"D-Day"	Normandy	The Allied invasion of Normandy is detailed—from preparation to execution—via vintage footage from both sides.
16.	February 22, 1953	"Killers and the Killed"	Victory in the Atlantic, 1943–1945	The U-Boats are ascendant, and their triumphs proclaimed in Germany. But the Allies fight back with new bases in countries bordering the Atlantic Ocean, new anti-submarine techniques and the new escort, or "jeep", carrier. Thus, the eventual neutralization and destruction of the German U-Boat forces is guaranteed.
17.	March 1, 1953	"The Turkey Shoot"	Conquest of the Marianas	Guam, a US territory, is invaded by Japanese a few days after Pearl Harbor and remains occupied for two and a half years. The Japanese fleet is destroyed in a classic "turkey shoot". Meanwhile, the Americans are preparing the bases in the Marianas for the ultimate bomber offensive against Japan.
18.	March 8, 1953	"Two If by Sea"	Peleliu and Angaur	Before the Philippine Islands, the US first attacks Peleliu and Anguar.
19.	March 15, 1953	"Battle for Leyte Gulf"	Sea battle for Leyte Gulf	The Japanese fleet is disintegrating, and the Imperial Navy conducts its last major operation in the Philippines. It ends in debacle: The risen battleships of Pearl Harbor avenge the attack in Surigao Strait, the Center Force is defeated in Sibuyan Sea, the jeep carriers and destroyers fend off a stronger Japanese force near Samar and the remaining Japanese aircraft carriers are sunk. This segment marked the near inevitability that the Japanese would be defeated.
20.	March 22, 1953	"Return of the Allies"	Liberation of the Philippines	Just after the US entered World War II, the Japanese conquered and occupied the Commonwealth of the Philippines, an American protectorate. But they still hope, and in January 1945, these were answered as much of the Philippines Islands were liberated and its people cheered the Americans. Their liberation became bloody as they fought their way in Manila, but still they cheered.
21.	March 29, 1953	"Full Fathom Five"	US submarines, 1941–1945	This episode show how US Navy submarines contributed to the Japanese empire's defeat, sinking thousands of tons of cargo ships.
22.	April 5, 1953	"The Fate of Europe"	Black Sea, south of France, surrender	Sevastopol was liberated and the Allies defeat Germany. The meeting of Roosevelt, Churchill and Stalin for final plans for Germany's surrender and the forming of the United Nations are depicted. At the end, Hitler commits suicide, and Nazi flags are torn apart and German military uniforms and hats lie on the ground, discarded.
23.	April 12, 1953	"Target Suribachi"	Iwo Jima	The US fought two battles here—the US Marines at Iwo Jima against the Japanese, and the US Navy against a typhoon. During the now-legendary events depicted in this episode, the series reaches the final throes of battle in the Pacific war against the Japanese. And as the scene of the recent Mount Suribachi memorial appears, viewers are once again reminded of the price that comes before true victory can be achieved.
24.	April 19, 1953	"The Road to Mandalay"	China, Burma, India, and Indian Ocean	The Japanese invade China in 1937, but the Japanese are not satisfied and they invade Indochina and Thailand, enabling the invasion of Burma. The US and British navies nurture their relations with the Indian Navy as supplies are built for the return. Eventually, it was decided to build a road to link with the Burma Road. Eventually, they "came back to Mandalay", and the first supplies traveled the road to cheering Chinese.
25.	April 26, 1953	"Suicide for Glory"	Okinawa	In a last effort at glory, Japan employs suicide pilots—the Kamikaze—who crash their planes into ships in order to destroy the American spirit. But the US Navy and Marines are ready for them with their guns, and they fought heroically against the onslaught. And on Okinawa, Americans fight a major battle with the Japanese Army.
26.	May 3, 1953	"Design for Peace"	Surrender of Japan and aftermath of war	The atomic bomb is detonated, and its effects demonstrated at Hiroshima and Nagasaki. Japan surrenders, signing the surrender documents aboard the USS Missouri. The US armed forces come home to signs saying, "Welcome Home" before they are greeted by mothers, wives, children and fellow neighbors.

== Notes ==
Literature

- Peter C. Rollins, "Victory at Sea: Cold War Epic"Gary R. Edgerton/Peter C Rollins (eds.), Television Histories. Shaping Collective Memory in the Media Age, Kentucky 2001, pp. 103–122.
- Robert Russell Bennett music manuscripts, 1911–1981. Deering Library, Northwestern University, Evanston IL. http://findingaids.library.northwestern.edu/catalog/inu-ead-mus-archon-186
