= Kwamina =

1961 musical by Richard Adler

- Original Broadway Cast Album
- Music: Richard Adler
- Lyrics: Richard Adler
- Book: Robert Alan Aurthur
- Premiere: October 23, 1961; 64 years ago: 54th Street Theatre
- Productions: 1961 Broadway

Kwamina is a musical with the libretto by Robert Alan Aurthur and music and lyrics by Richard Adler.

== Production ==
The musical opened in out of town tryouts in Toronto, where, as noted by Ken Mandelbaum, "The reviews were promising", and then ran in Boston. Kwamina premiered on Broadway at the 54th Street Theatre on October 23, 1961, and closed on November 18, 1961, after 32 performances. The production starred Sally Ann Howes, Terry Carter, Robert Guillaume, and Brock Peters, and was directed by Robert Lewis and choreographed by Agnes de Mille. Mandelbaum noted that the Broadway reviews were "mixed but mostly negative", but did praise de Mille, her dancers, and the set.

== Synopsis ==
The son of an African tribal chief returns home after attending medical school in London and finds his modern methods conflict with his village's traditions. He also butts heads with the village's white female doctor, but he ultimately falls in love with her.

== Original cast album ==
The original cast album was recorded for Capitol Records on Monday, November 20, 1961 following the Saturday close two days earlier.

Jazz pianist Billy Taylor released The Original Jazz Score of Kwamina in 1961.

== Songs ==
Act I

- "The Cocoa Bean Song" - Ako, Singers and Company
- "Welcome Home" - Singers, Spear Dancers and Company
- "The Sun is Beginning to Crow" - Company
- "Did You Hear That?" - Eve and Kwamina
- "You're As English As" - Eve
- "Seven Sheep, Four Red Shirts, and a Bottle of Gin" - Akufo, Singers, Dancers and Company
- "Nothing More To Look Forward To" - Ako and Naii
- "What's Wrong With Me?" - Eve
- "Something Big" - Kwamina and Company
- "Ordinary People" - Eve and Kwamina
- "A Man Can Have No Choice" - Obitsebi
- "What Happened to Me Tonight?" - Eve

Act II

- "One Wife" - Mammy Trader, Alla, Singers and Dancers
- "Nothing More to Look Forward To (Reprise)" - Naii
- "Something Big (Reprise)" - Company
- "Another Time, Another Place" - Eve
- "Fetish" - Obitsebi and Dancers

== Notes ==
- You Gotta Have Heart by Richard Adler. 1990
- Sing Out Louise! by Dennis McGovern & Deborah Grace Winer. Schirmer Books, 1993.
- Not Since Carrie: Forty Years of Broadway Musical Flops by Ken Mandelbaum. St. Martin's Press, 1991
- Slings and Arrows: Theatre in My Life by Robert Lewis, Stein & Day, 1984. ISBN 0-8128-2965-4
