= Bay Raitt =

American artist

Bay Leaf Raitt is an American artist, 3D graphic novelist, animator and video game developer. He was the Creature Facial Lead for Gollum in the Lord of the Rings movie trilogy and worked at Valve Software for 9 years.

== Career ==
Raitt worked for Image Comics, providing computer-image coloring for Steve Oliff to use with "Spawn", "The Pitt", and "The Maxx". He later worked at Protozoa, providing 3D animation computer effects.

In 1999 Raitt emigrated to New Zealand to work for Weta Digital. In that post he was responsible for creating the computer-generated face for Gollum in The Lord of the Rings. Raitt and his colleagues Richard Baneham, Eric Saindon and Ken McGaugh won the Visual Effects Society Award for Best Character Animation in a Live Action Motion Picture for their work on The Lord of the Rings.

In video games, he is a modeler, animator, and level designer for the videogame Squeezils. He worked for Valve for 9 years until he departed on February 13, 2013. He worked on the Source Filmmaker tool, the TF2 Meet the Team animated shorts, TF2 Hats, and the video games Half-Life 2, Half-Life 2: Episode One, Team Fortress 2, Day of Defeat: Source, Left 4 Dead, Left 4 Dead 2, and Portal 1 and 2.

He founded the Spiraloid Workshop Company and worked with Unity3d.

== Personal life ==
He is the nephew of singer-songwriter Bonnie Raitt, and the grandson of musical theater actor John Raitt.
