= Leonard Graves =

American actor and singer

- Born: 1927; Memphis, Tennessee, U.S.
- Died: January 25, 2000 (aged 72–73)
- Education: Juilliard School
- Occupation: Actor
- Spouse: Meryl Graves
- Children: 4 sons

Leonard Graves (1927–2000) was an American actor and singer best known for narrating the 1952 television documentary Victory at Sea. Graves was the only voice on the 26-part series, which won multiple awards, including a 1954 Emmy for Best Public Affairs Program, a special Peabody award and the Freedoms Foundation's George Washington Medal.

Graves was born in Memphis, Tennessee in 1927. The son of a farmer, he was a soloist in a local church choir and began his performing career in radio. He joined the Broadway cast of The King and I as the Interpreter and also understudied for Yul Brynner as the King, filling in on many occasions. Graves took over the lead when Brynner left the show, and after a two-year run on Broadway, he joined a national tour. Moving to California, he performed with the Los Angeles Grand Opera Company and the San Francisco Opera, and also performed the starring roles of Julius Caesar and Macbeth with the UCLA Opera Workshop.

Graves appeared in several motion pictures, including:

- Three Brave Men (1956) as Flaxman (uncredited)
- The Joker Is Wild (1957) as Tim Coogan
- The Brothers Karamazov (1958) as Third Court Officer (uncredited)
- The Buccaneer (1958) as Chighizola
- Pork Chop Hill (1959) as Lt. Cook
- A Private's Affair (1959) as General's Aide (uncredited)
- Pay or Die (1960) as Opera Singer (uncredited)
- The Story of Ruth (1960) as Reaper (uncredited)
- A Message from the Future (שדר מן העתיד) (1981) as Anderson (final film role)

Graves also had guest roles in a number of television series including Navy Log and The Big Picture (Army In Action episodes). In 1968 he was appointed manager of the Memphis Opera Theater. Graves later moved to Israel with his wife where managed and performed with the Israel National Opera. He reportedly died circa 2000.
