= No Other Love (Rodgers and Hammerstein song) =

Rodgers and Hammerstein show tune

Song
- Published: 1953
- Genre: Show tune
- Composer: Richard Rodgers
- Lyricist: Oscar Hammerstein II

"No Other Love"

Single by Perry Como
- B-side: "Keep It Gay"
- Released: June 20, 1953
- Recorded: May 19, 1953
- Genre: Traditional pop; vocal; jazz
- Length: 3:14
- Label: RCA Victor
- Songwriter: Richard Rodgers

Perry Como singles chronology
"My One and Only Heart" (1953)	"No Other Love" (1953)	"Keep It Gay" (1953)

"No Other Love" is a show tune from the 1953 Rodgers and Hammerstein musical Me and Juliet.

== Background ==
Richard Rodgers originally composed this tune (with the title "Beneath the Southern Cross") for the NBC television series Victory at Sea (1952/1953). When Rodgers and Oscar Hammerstein II collaborated on Me and Juliet, Rodgers took his old melody and set it to new words by Hammerstein, producing the song "No Other Love". The song has a tango rhythm (referred to by Rodgers as a "languid tango" in his autobiography, Musical Stages).

The 1953 song should not be confused with "No Other Love", a song of 1950. The melody for the 1950 song was taken from Étude in E major, Op. 10, No. 3 by Frédéric Chopin.

== Other recordings ==
- Vikki Carr included in her album Discovery II (1964).
- Perry Como recorded the Rodgers and Hammerstein song on May 19, 1953, which was released by RCA Victor. The record reached No. 1 on both the Billboard and Cash Box charts in August 1953.
- Bing Crosby recorded it for Decca Records on December 31, 1953 and it was also included on his LP Bing Sings the Hits.
- Michael Feinstein - included in his 1988 album Isn't It Romantic.
- Ella Fitzgerald included the song on her album Ella Sings Broadway (1963).
- Ronnie Hilton - his 1956 version reached No. 1 for six weeks on the UK Singles Chart.
- Edmund Hockridge - reached No. 24 in the UK charts in 1956.
- Jay and the Americans released a cover version of the song in 1968 which reached No. 119 in the Billboard charts.
- The Johnston Brothers reached No. 22 in the UK charts in 1956.
- Mantovani for his Decca album Songs To Remember (1960).
- Helen O'Connell recorded for Capitol (2487) in 1953.
- Keely Smith included in her album Because You're Mine (1962).
- Victory at Sea the instrumental only recording is used for Episode 10 Beneath the Southern Cross.

== See also ==
- List of UK Singles Chart number ones of the 1950s
