= Steppin' =

Studio album by The Pointer Sisters
- Released: May 19, 1975
- Studio: Wally Heider Studios (San Francisco, California)
- Genre: R&B; soul; funk
- Label: ABC; Blue Thumb
- Producer: David Rubinson & Friends, Inc.

The Pointer Sisters chronology
Live at the Opera House (1974)	Steppin' (1975)	The Best of the Pointer Sisters (1976)

Singles from Steppin'
- 1. "How Long (Betcha' Got a Chick on the Side)" Released: July 26, 1975; 2. "Going Down Slowly" Released: November 12, 1975

Professional ratings
Review scores
Source	Rating
AllMusic	4.5/5 stars

Steppin' is the third studio album by The Pointer Sisters, released in 1975 on the ABC/Blue Thumb label.

== History ==
Steppin', which was more R&B heavy than the sister quartet's previous albums, generated a number one R&B hit with its first single, "How Long (Betcha' Got a Chick on the Side)". It also peaked at #20 on the Billboard Hot 100. A second single, "Going Down Slowly", was moderately successful, peaking at #16 on the R&B chart and #61 on the Billboard Hot 100. The album was remastered and issued on CD in 2006 by Hip-O Select.

== Track listing ==
Side one
No.	Title	Writer(s)	Length
1.	"How Long (Betcha' Got a Chick on the Side)"	Anita Pointer, Bonnie Pointer, David Rubinson	7:21
2.	"Sleeping Alone"	Stevie Wonder	4:29
3.	"Easy Days"	Isaac Hayes, A. Pointer, B. Pointer, June Pointer	3:37
4.	"Chainey Do"	Willie McTell, Taj Mahal	6:05

Side two
No.	Title	Writer(s)	Length
5.	"I Ain't Got Nothin' But the Blues - A Medley in Tribute to Duke Ellington" ("I Ain't Got Nothin' But the Blues" / "Rocks in My Bed" / "Creole Love Song" / "Satin Doll" / "I Got It Bad (and That Ain't Good)" / "Mood Indigo")	Duke Ellington, Don George / Ellington / Ellington, Bruce Good / Ellington, Johnny Mercer, Billy Strayhorn / Ellington, Paul Francis Webster / Ellington, Irving Mills, Barney Bigard	6:08
6.	"Save the Bones for Henry Jones"	Danny Barker, Vernon Lee	3:10
7.	"Wanting Things"	Hal David, Burt Bacharach	3:11
8.	"Going Down Slowly"	Allen Toussaint	7:56

== Personnel ==
The Pointer Sisters

- Anita Pointer, Ruth Pointer, Bonnie Pointer, June Pointer – vocals

Musicians

- Tom Salisbury – acoustic piano
- Stevie Wonder – electric piano (track 2)
- Herbie Hancock – Hohner clavinet (track 4)
- Jim Rothermel – Hohner clavinet (track 6)
- Chris Michie – guitar
- Wah Wah Watson – guitar (tracks 1, 3, 4, 8)
- Eugene Santini – bass
- Paul Jackson – bass (track 4)
- Gaylord Birch – drums, percussion
- Bill Summers – percussion (track 4)

=== Production ===
- David Rubinson & Friends, Inc. – producer
- Fred Catero – recording engineer
- Fred Catero, David Rubinson – re-mix engineers
- Jeremy Zatkin – recording engineer on "Chainey Do"
- George Horn, Phil Brown – mastering engineers
- Tom Salisbury – arrangements
- Allyn Ferguson – arrangements on "I Ain't Got Nothin' But the Blues"
- Ken Welch, Mitzie Welch – treatment on "I Ain't Got Nothin' But the Blues"

== Charts ==
Chart performance for Steppin'
Chart (1975)	Peak position
US Billboard 200	22
US Billboard Top R&B/Hip-Hop Albums	3
