= Steam Heat =

Show tune

"Steam Heat" is a show tune from the 1954 Broadway musical The Pajama Game, written by Richard Adler and Jerry Ross.

"Steam Heat" was one of four songs which Adler and Ross wrote ("within two days, I think" - Adler) and submitted to George Abbott in hopes of being hired to score the stage musical Abbott was developing, which would become The Pajama Game. Rather than complementing the musical's storyline of a labor dispute at a garment factory, "Steam Heat" manifests as an overt staged number being a song-and-dance number featured as the "entertainment portion" of a union rally with the factory boss's secretary Gladys as lead performer. Carol Haney originated the role of Gladys and she sang and danced the "Steam Heat" number in the original production of The Pajama Game with the accompaniment of Peter Gennaro and Buzz Miller.

== History ==
"Steam Heat"

Single by Patti Page
- B-side: "Lonely Days"
- Released: April 1954
- Recorded: 1954
- Genre: Pop
- Length: 2:16
- Label: Mercury 70380X45
- Songwriters: Richard Adler, Jerry Ross

Patti Page singles chronology
| "Cross Over the Bridge" (1954) | "Steam Heat" (1954) | "What a Dream" (1954) |

The "Steam Heat" number in The Pajama Game would make stage musical history by introducing the signature style of choreographer Bob Fosse. George Abbott had asked Fosse to stage "Steam Heat" in a manner appropriate to the amateur entertainment it was supposed to be, with Abbott specifically stating: "Do something small". When the "Steam Heat" number, featuring Fosse's minimalist but riveting dance moves, prefigured its Broadway reception by stopping the show during The Pajama Game's out-of-town tryout in New Haven, Abbott, discomfited by the disruption to the play's flow, moved to cut the number; however Abbott's partner Jerome Robbins successfully lobbied for its retention.

The "Steam Heat" number would be recreated for the 1957 film version of The Pajama Game in which Haney would perform "Steam Heat" accompanied by Buzz Miller and Kenneth LeRoy. Haney, who would die in 1964 at age 39, had severe health problems during the film's shoot, being hospitalized at one point and according to Harvey Evans, a dancer in the film: "When you watch 'Steam Heat' [in the film] you can see that [physically] she's not really up to par".

In the national tour of the original Broadway production of The Pajama Game Barbara Bostock would perform "Steam Heat" with accompaniment from Lee Capo and Cy Young.

The 1955 West End production of The Pajama Game featured "Steam Heat" as performed by Elizabeth Seal with accompaniment from Johnny Greenland and Ivor Meggido.

In the 2006-07 Roundabout Theatre revival of The Pajama Game the "Steam Heat" number was reassigned to a factory worker character named Mae, played by Joyce Chittick: Chittick was accompanied on the "Steam Heat" number by David Eggers and Vince Pesce. Taprena Augustine as Mae performed "Steam Heat" in the national tour of the Roundabout Theatre production (2008–09).

"Steam Heat" was performed in Fosse by Meg Gillentine with Julio Monge and Josh Rhodes.

"Steam Heat" became a staple of Shirley MacLaine's nightclub act, as MacLaine had been the understudy for Carol Haney in the original Broadway production of The Pajama Game and had gone on for Haney at a performance attended by film producer Hal B. Wallis who was interested in Haney. MacLaine's performance had so impressed Wallis that he'd come backstage to invite her to audition for him the next day, resulting in MacLaine being signed for her motion picture debut in The Trouble with Harry. ("Hernando's Hideaway", Carol Haney's other big number from The Pajama Game, was also a staple of MacLaine's act.)

"Steam Heat" became at Top Ten hit for Patti Page as released by Mercury Records as catalog number 70380: debuting on the Billboard chart of 26 May 1954, the disc charted for nine weeks with a #8. (The film rights for The Pajama Game would eventually be purchased to provide a vehicle for Page although she was to play the character of Babe rather than Gladys; ultimately Babe would be played in the film by Doris Day.) The recording featured a replication of a radiator being pounded, an effect performed by Mac Ceppos, a career session violinist who previously had been heard barking on Page's 1952 #1 hit "The Doggie in the Window". Page's recording was prominently featured at the end of "Hot Water", Episode 20 of Season 3 of Pretty Little Liars broadcast February 19, 2013. Spencer Hastings (played by Troian Bellisario) had been endangered by being locked in an overheating sauna earlier in the episode, which ends with the series' unseen stalker putting the finishing touches on a funeral wreath while listening to the Patti Page recording of "Steam Heat".

Ella Fitzgerald recorded "Steam Heat" for her 1963 album release Ella Sings Broadway.

Liza Minnelli and Tracey Everitt sang and danced Everitt's choreography to "Steam Heat" on The Judy Garland Show's Christmas Special episode (Aired Dec. 22, 1963).

The Pointer Sisters remade "Steam Heat" for their 1974 album That's a Plenty on which "Steam Heat" was framed by the original composition (by Jeffrey Cohen and Bruce Good) "Bangin' On the Pipes". Released as a single by the Pointer Sisters, "Steam Heat" failed to become a major hit, only "Bubbling Under" the Billboard Hot 100 at #108. However "Steam Heat", which was featured on the 1974 concert album The Pointer Sisters Live at the Opera House, became a signature song of the Pointer Sisters' first career phase, with the group performing "Bangin' On the Pipes"/"Steam Heat" on The Carol Burnett Show broadcast of September 28, 1974. The November 27, 1976, broadcast of The Mary Tyler Moore Show titled "Murray Can't Lose", featured Georgia Engel performing a sultry song and dance number to "Steam Heat". The Good Times episode broadcast December 20, 1978, featured cast members Esther Rolle, Ja'net Dubois, BernNadette Stanis and Janet Jackson performing "Steam Heat", with the quartet introduced as "the Pointless Sisters."

Wall Street Crash performed "Steam Heat" for the European release of their 1982 self-titled album.
