= Me and Juliet =

1953 musical by Rodgers and Hammerstein

- Original Broadway windowcard (1953)
- Music: Richard Rodgers
- Lyrics: Oscar Hammerstein II
- Book: Oscar Hammerstein II
- Productions: 1953 Broadway; 1954 Chicago

Me and Juliet is a musical with music by Richard Rodgers, and lyrics and book by Oscar Hammerstein II. The sixth stage collaboration by Rodgers & Hammerstein, it tells a story of romance backstage at a long-running musical: assistant stage manager Larry woos chorus girl Jeanie behind the back of her electrician boyfriend, Bob. Me and Juliet premiered in 1953 and was considered a modest success — it ran for much of a year on Broadway and had a limited run in Chicago (altogether nearly 500 performances), and returned a small profit to its backers.

Rodgers had long wanted to write a musical comedy about the cast and crew backstage at a theatre. After Rodgers and Hammerstein had another hit with The King and I in 1951, Rodgers proposed the backstage project to his partner. Hammerstein was unenthusiastic, thinking the subject matter trivial, but agreed to do the project. The play required complex machinery, designed by Jo Mielziner, so that the audience could view action not only on the stage of the theatre where the show-within-the-show (also named Me and Juliet) takes place, but in the wings and on the light bridge (high above the stage, from which the lighting technicians train spotlights) as well.

When Me and Juliet began tryout performances in Cleveland, the duo realized the show had problems with plot and staging. Extensive revisions during the remaining Cleveland and Boston tryouts failed to fix the difficulties with the plot, which the critics considered weak and uninteresting. The show was met with poor reviews, though Mielziner's staging won praise from audience and critics. The show closed once it had exhausted its advance sales. Bill Hayes, the show's star, states in his autobiography Like Sands Through the Hourglass (2005):

We played nearly five hundred performances, all to full houses. Production costs were paid off and substantial profits went into the R&H till. So, though not in the same category as the storied five that were made into films - Oklahoma!, Carousel, South Pacific, The King and I and The Sound of Music - our show must be considered a success.

With the exception of a short run in Chicago, there was no national tour, and the show has seldom been seen. A small-scale production was presented by London's Finborough Theatre in 2010.

== Inception ==
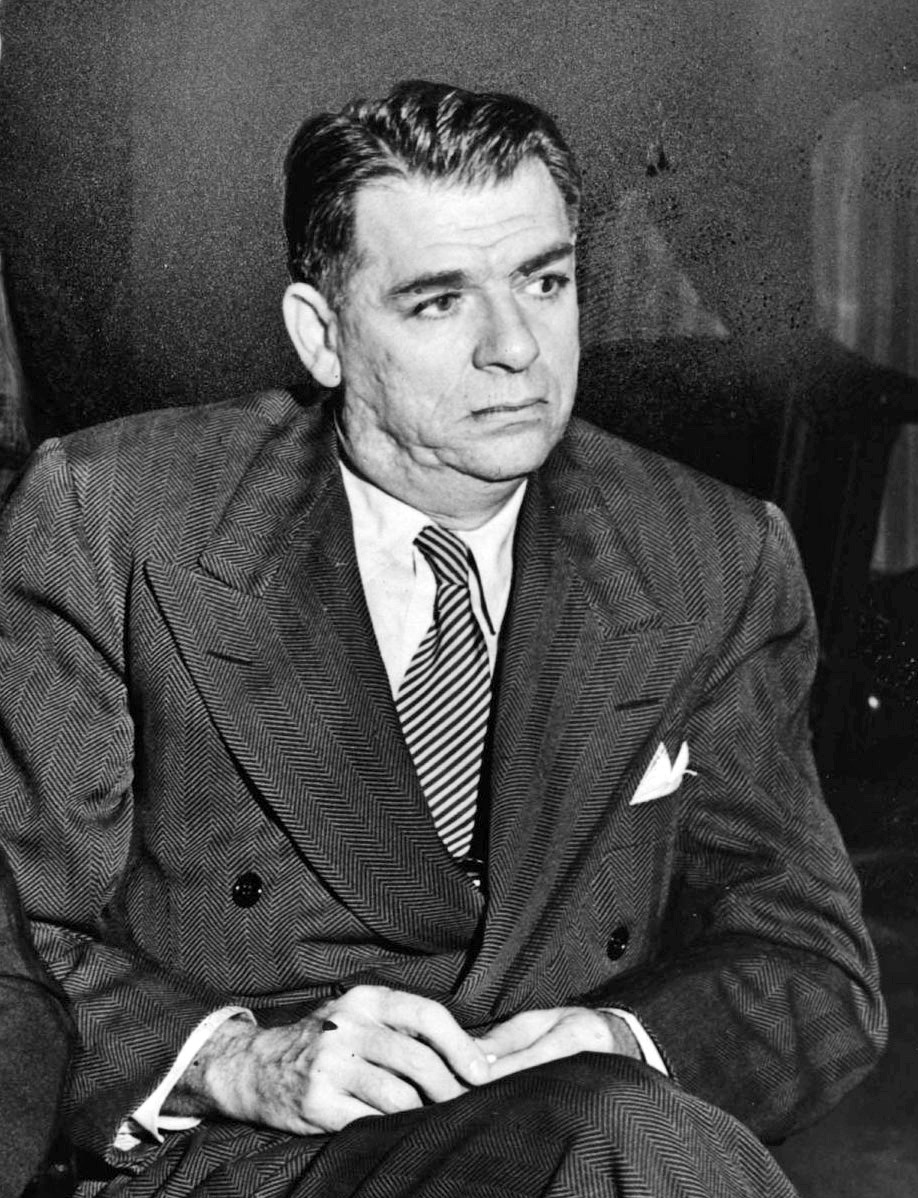
Oscar Hammerstein II

The origins of Me and Juliet can be traced to the early days of the relationship between Rodgers and Hammerstein. The musical Oklahoma! opened in 1943; it was Rodgers and Hammerstein's first work together and a massive hit. Soon after Oklahoma! opened, Rodgers began considering the idea of a musical set backstage at a theatre staging a musical. The production could explore different areas of the backstage world. Rodgers also saw it as the opportunity to write a pure musical comedy, without the serious themes which had marked their early works—such as the attacks on racism in South Pacific, and the cultural tolerance in The King and I.

Hammerstein was initially unenthusiastic, thinking the subject matter trivial, but Rodgers pressed the matter. It was Hammerstein's turn to give in to his partner; Rodgers had agreed to the project that became the 1947 musical Allegro, their initial failure, under pressure from Hammerstein, who had long dreamed of doing a serious musical about an ordinary man. According to Stephen Sondheim, a protégé of Hammerstein, "Oscar was able to keep the partnership together by taking Dick's suggestion [for a backstage musical], which he did not want to take." As the two discussed the backstage idea, Hammerstein became more enthusiastic, suggesting that the show start with the stage entirely bare, as if the audience had come in not at performance time but at another time during the day. Such effects are today well known following the success of other "backstagers" such as A Chorus Line; in the early 1950s they were unrealized and novel.

The two discussed the matter at a meeting in early 1952 in Palm Beach, Florida, where Rodgers was vacationing as he worked on melodic sketches for the television documentary Victory at Sea. Rodgers suggested dispensing with the overture, reserving that for the overture of the show-within-the-show. Following another meeting in mid-1952, they called in long-time Rodgers and Hammerstein stage designer Jo Mielziner and hired him to design the sets. Mielziner confirmed that a scene could be played part onstage and part in the backstage world, but that this would be expensive. In August 1952, Hammerstein began a sketch of the plot; by early October he had a near-complete first draft. As the show was to be musical comedy, the pair hired one of the top musical comedy directors, George Abbott, who accepted the position without reading the script. He regretted the haste of this decision as soon as he read the script, finding it sentimental and melodramatic. He confided his concerns to the pair; in response, Hammerstein told him to make whatever changes in the script he thought best. With Hammerstein's permission, Abbott made major changes to the plot.

Hammerstein had only briefly described the show-within-the-show. Fearing the show would be uninteresting, Abbott hoped that some highlights would be furnished when the show-within-the-show, as yet only briefly described by Hammerstein, was fleshed out. According to author and composer Ethan Mordden in his book about the duo's works, Hammerstein thought the show-within-the-show was to be:

something bizarre, to stand out and amaze us, the better to set off the plain life of the actor ... We shall imagine some rather advanced musical of the near future, something beyond even Allegro, with archetypical characters—a simple hero and his lovable Juliet, the rapacious Don Juan and his volatile Carmen. Then the audience will always know where it is. Contrast is the key. The show-within must look and sound, at every moment, as far from real life as possible.

Hammerstein included an incident he had seen when he was a neophyte assistant stage manager: a chorus boy came up to a chorus girl and asked to use some of her mascara—to disguise a hole in the boy's black socks. Hammerstein stated, "we were religious in keeping away from the trite things—the kindly old stage door man named Pop, the pretty little understudy who replaces the star on opening night. We steered clear, too, of the backstage story of a company putting on a new show, with all the anxieties of the actors and producers ... It seemed right to focus on a show which is already running because we wanted to tell a story about a community, the backstage community, and this community becomes settled and established after a show opens."

In addition to Abbott, the duo recruited other professionals experienced in musical comedy. Choreographer Robert Alton had worked in such hits as Panama Hattie and in movie musicals. Don Walker was hired to do the orchestrations; his would be simpler than those of Robert Russell Bennett, who usually performed that function in the pair's musicals but who was not available. Irene Sharaff was engaged to design the more than 300 costumes which would be needed. The show was originally named Hercules and Juliet, but they soon changed it to Me and Juliet. The Majestic Theatre, which Rodgers and Hammerstein desired to have for Me and Juliet, was currently occupied by their South Pacific, four years into its run. Arrangements were made to shift South Pacific to the Broadway Theatre though, due to schedule conflicts, this meant moving that show to Boston for five weeks.

== Plot ==
For theatrical terminology, see Stage (theatre).

The entire action of the show takes place in and close to a Broadway theatre in which the long-running musical Me and Juliet (the "show-within-the-show") is playing. The setting is the early 1950s.

=== Act 1 ===
A half-hour remains before the show is to begin. Electrician Sidney and chorus girl Jeanie are irritated at Sidney's fellow electrician, Bob, for not being there. Sidney needs Bob's help; Jeanie, Bob's girlfriend, is annoyed at being stood up. Sidney warns Jeanie that Bob may not be the right man for her; these are doubts she has too (Musical numbers: "A Very Special Day"/"That's the Way it Happens").

Jeanie leaves, and Bob appears. Bob tells Sidney he likes dating Jeanie, but does not plan to marry her. When Sidney jokes that Jeanie can do better than Bob, the larger man momentarily chokes him. Jeanie sees this, adding to her doubts about Bob. Larry, the assistant stage manager, is also attracted to Jeanie (reprise of "That's the Way it Happens").

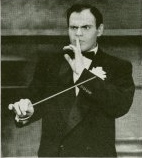
George S. Irving, as Dario the conductor

Stage manager Mac sees to the final preparations, and the overture to the internal show is played by the orchestra, led by Dario, the conductor ("Overture to Me and Juliet"). The internal show's curtain rises ("Marriage Type Love"): the main male character, "Me" (performed by Charlie, a singer), tells the audience about the girl he wants to marry, Juliet (Lily, a singer). He also tells the audience of the girl he is determined not to marry, Carmen, who scares him. "Me" feels Carmen (the lead female dancing role) is better suited to his boss, Don Juan (the lead male dancer). As the internal show continues, Bob and Sidney are on the light bridge. Bob identifies with Don Juan for his reluctance to marry ("Keep It Gay").

Another day at Me and Juliet, and the dancers are rehearsing under Mac's supervision (conclusion of "Keep It Gay"). At Larry's urging, Jeanie decides to audition for the position of second understudy for the role of Juliet. On learning this, Mac takes Larry aside and warns him never to get involved with a cast member of a show while in charge of it. No sooner has Mac said this than his girlfriend Betty (currently in the show across the street) auditions for the role of Carmen. The producer gives her the role. As Larry looks on with amusement, Mac accepts this professionally, then stamps off in disgust.

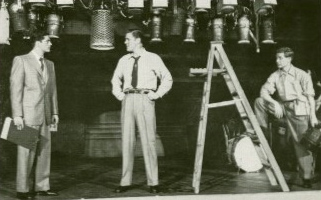
From left: Bill Hayes (as Larry) and Mark Dawson (Bob) exchange hostile stares as Edwin Phillips (Sidney) looks on. From the original production.

Jeanie practices for her own audition ("No Other Love"), and Larry tells her that the audience will accept her if she's "a real kid" like Juliet, but reject her if she's a "phony" ("The Big Black Giant"). Larry desires a romance with Jeannie, but fears the larger and stronger Bob.

Several months pass, during which Jeanie gets the job as second understudy. Larry and Jeanie are meeting secretly and keeping their budding romance from Bob. The rest of the cast is aware of their dates—one dancer spotted them in a chili restaurant on Eighth Avenue.

Mac, true to his principles, has dumped Betty, but the two are still attracted to each other. Betty enjoys acting ("It's Me"). As she performs in the internal show, Bob and Sidney are on the light bridge again.

Bob has been fooled by Jeanie's lies about why they are not going out, and is enlightened when Sidney lets slip that Larry and Jeanie are seeing each other. Bob demands proof, and Sidney tells Bob to watch what happens in the wings during the upcoming Act 1 finale to Me and Juliet. Bob sees Larry and Jeanie kiss after she comes offstage with a tray of flowers, an action caught by Bob's spotlight. Mac enters, grasps the situation, sends Larry away, then puts the tray back in Jeanie's hands and pushes her onstage. She is pursued by Bob's spotlight, which relentlessly follows her around the stage as more and more of the dancers become aware something has gone badly wrong. Bob drops a sandbag from the light bridge; it knocks the tray Jeanie is holding to the ground. Mac orders the curtain lowered in front of a stage in panic.

=== Act 2 ===
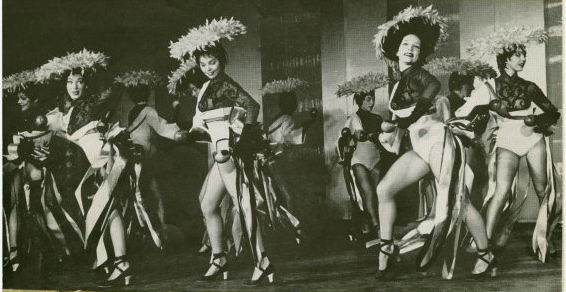
Dance scene from the show-within-the-show. Original production, 1953.

In the downstairs lounge, a few minutes before the Act 2 curtain for Me and Juliet rises, the ushers comment on the remarkable conclusion to Act 1—although the audience has noticed nothing unusual ("Intermission Talk"). As Act 2 of the internal show starts, an enraged Bob is searching the theatre for Jeannie and Larry. Unable to find them, he takes up position at a bar across the street where he can watch the theatre doors ("It Feels Good"). The perspective shifts to the onstage action in Me and Juliet, where Don Juan and Carmen are on a date ("We Deserve Each Other"), before moving to the manager's office where Larry and Jeanie are hiding out ("I'm Your Girl"). Mac has only just begun his lecture to them when Bob enters through the window, having heard familiar voices. In the ensuing fight, Bob knocks out Mac, but when the electrician grabs for Jeannie, Larry strongly defends her. The fight ends when Bob accidentally hits his head on a radiator and is knocked out as well.

Ruby, the company manager, sends Larry and Jeannie down to the stage to continue the play. After Bob and Mac recover, Ruby informs Bob that Larry and Jeanie had secretly married earlier that day, and the surprised electrician leaves. Mac, fearful of more mayhem, goes in search of him. As Mac exits, the phone rings, and Ruby takes the call. It is the producer, calling for Mac to transfer him to another show, thereby setting him free to resume his romance with Betty.

Onstage, Me and Juliet is concluding. After the internal show finishes ("Finale to Me and Juliet"), Larry, who will be the new stage manager, insists on rehearsing a scene from the show. Seeing Bob enter with a scowl, Larry orders him and Sidney to be present the next morning to re-angle the lights. Taken aback, and rather sheepishly, Bob says "I didn't know you were married" before quietly leaving, after stating, "I'll be here, I guess." Jeanie is congratulated by her showmates, but Larry, all business, waves them to their places to rehearse the scene. As Lily has had to leave, Jeanie stands in for her as Juliet, while Larry sings the part of Me in the scene, as the curtain falls ("Finale of Our Play").

== Rehearsals and tryouts ==
The cast consisted mostly of unknowns, though Isabel Bigley, who had just originated Sister Sarah Brown in Guys and Dolls, was given the leading role of chorus girl Jeanie. For Larry, the assistant stage manager who falls in love with Jeanie, they cast Bill Hayes, a well-known stage and television actor. William Tabbert, the original Lt. Joe Cable in South Pacific was considered for the part of Larry, but lost out because he was thought to be too tall to be afraid of Mark Dawson, hired as the towering bully Bob.

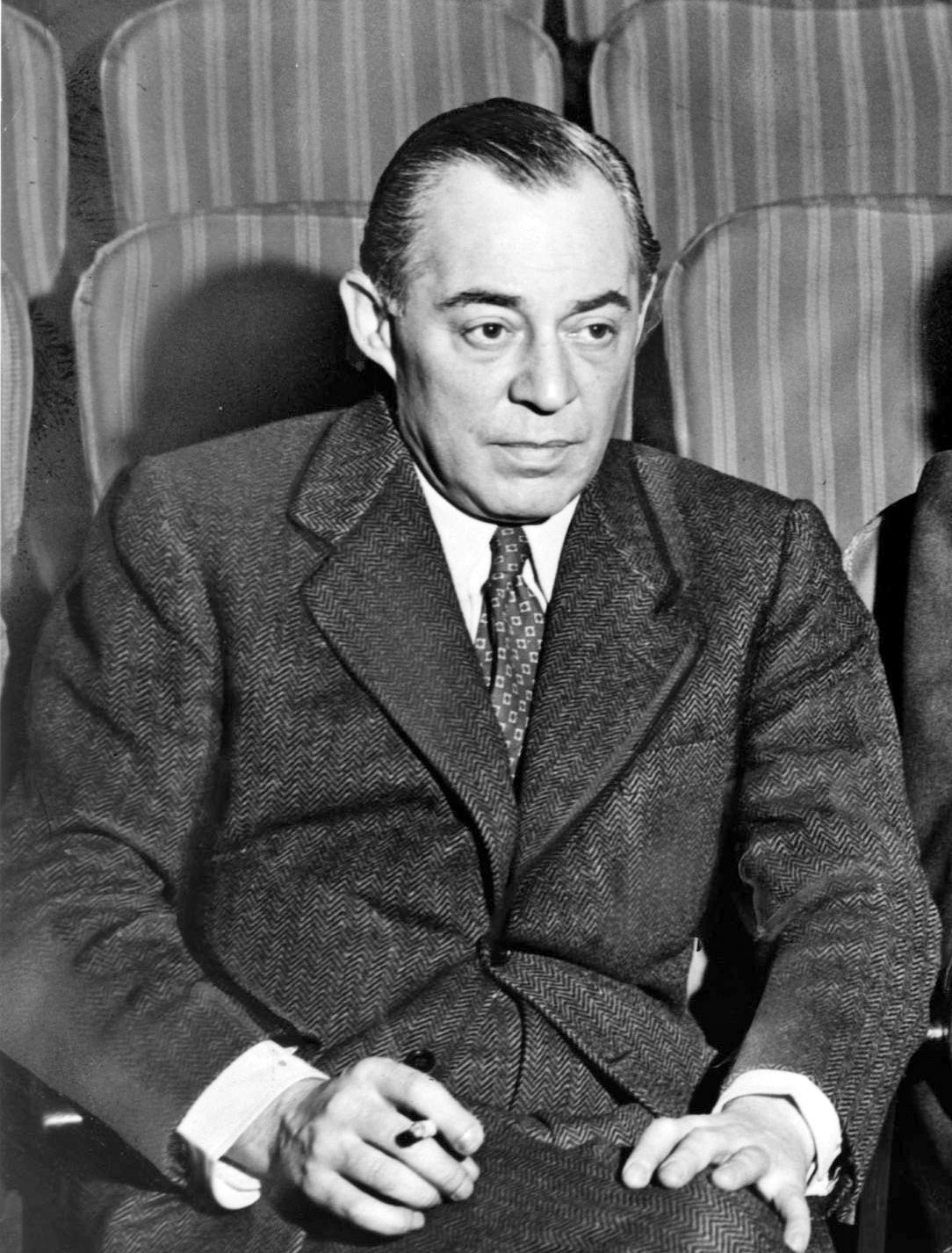
Richard Rodgers

Chorus auditions began March 10, 1953, at Broadway's Majestic Theatre; Rodgers, Hammerstein, and Abbott listened to more than 1,000 people. Rehearsals opened at the Majestic for principals and the Alvin Theatre for dancers. According to Saul Pett, a freelance reporter who was allowed to observe the show's rehearsals, "everyone seems relaxed except Hammerstein." The lyricist's son James served as second assistant stage manager. James Hammerstein remembered having a difficult relationship with Rodgers; the composer suggested James do his work from front of house, rather than from backstage. "I think he thought it was his show and his bailiwick. Why should a Hammerstein be back there?" James Hammerstein found the lead female dancer attractive, and asked her out. Just before the date, Rodgers fired her, telling James Hammerstein to break the news.

Pett recorded the technical problems which had to be solved to accomplish the complex staging:

A number of key scenes required the audience to both see the play-within-the-play and at the same time observe the realism of the stage manager's operations in the wings. To achieve this result and to make both elements simultaneous, the major part of the production had to hang on specially-constructed overhead steel tracks. Synchronized electric motors slowly moved the stage pictures off into the wings far enough to expose the stage manager's desk and actors and stagehands offstage awaiting their cues.

During the rehearsals, the duo took out two production numbers, "Wake Up, Little Theatre" and "Dance", concerned that the show was running long. The actress playing Juliet in the internal play proved to be a fine singer but a poor actress; she was replaced by Helena Scott. Abbott had few negative comments after the final New York run-through, and the company entrained for Cleveland, site of the first tryouts, in high spirits, sleeping little on the train ride. RCA Records put up the $350,000 cost of the production in exchange for a fifty-percent interest and rights to the original cast recording.

The tryouts in Cleveland were at the Hanna Theatre. The dress rehearsal the night before the initial performance revealed a number of problems with the show; during the first act alone, Hammerstein dictated eight pages of notes. The sandbag which falls from the light bridge near the end of Act 1 dropped off-cue, nearly striking Isabel Bigley, who played Jeanie. Pett remembered that the rehearsal was stopped often, as Rodgers sought to work out each problem as it arose, and the rehearsal, which began at 8 p.m. lasted until 2 a.m.

The Cleveland premiere on the evening of April 20, 1953, saw a distinguished crowd turn out. When the stage backdrop failed to come down on time, Hammerstein was heard to mutter, "Damn and damn and damn! This is a new way: they saved it for the performance!" Nevertheless, the crowd gave the show a rousing welcome. The Cleveland critics thought well of the show, but were concerned about the weak story. After the Cleveland reactions and problems, according to Rodgers biographer Meryle Secrest, "what had seemed to be a show needing minor adjustments became a musical in serious trouble". Bigley remembered that she had just come from a hit and "there just wasn't the same energy". Hammerstein had intended to omit the overture, with the audience to watch, after the curtain rose, a blank stage on which the play-within-the-play performers and crew drifted in and began their preparations. Expecting the orchestra to begin the evening, the audience talked throughout the initial scenes before being quieted by the internal show's overture; in response, the duo abandoned Hammerstein's concept and opened with an overture.

In contrast to the levity on their first train ride, the company was downcast and exhausted en route from Cleveland to Boston for the final tryouts. The show opened previews in Boston on May 6. A majority of the Boston critics liked the show, and expressed confidence that Rodgers and Hammerstein could fix the problems with the plot. The pair took out one song, "Meat and Potatoes", which was felt to be too raunchy. After watching it performed by Joan McCracken, who played Betty (Carmen in the play-within-the-play), the pair decided it had too many double entendres and cut it. It was replaced by "We Deserve Each Other", which the pair had written in a Cleveland hotel room. Another cut song, "You Never Had It So Good", included lyrics which satirized the duo's own earlier efforts. Its lyrics, "I'll sew, I'll bake / I'll try to make your evenings all enchanted. / My honeycake, / I'm yours to take, but don't take me for granted", alluded to two songs from South Pacific, "Some Enchanted Evening" and "Honey Bun". Audiences continued to greet the show warmly.

During the Boston previews, the duo heard the audience praise the sets, a reaction which usually augured ill for the show itself. Hammerstein wrote to The King and I director John van Druten:

Me and Juliet looks like a great big hit. It is a change of pace for us and in some quarters we may be criticized because it is not as high-falutin' as our most recent efforts. It is in fact an out and out musical comedy. If this be treason, make the most of it.

== Production ==
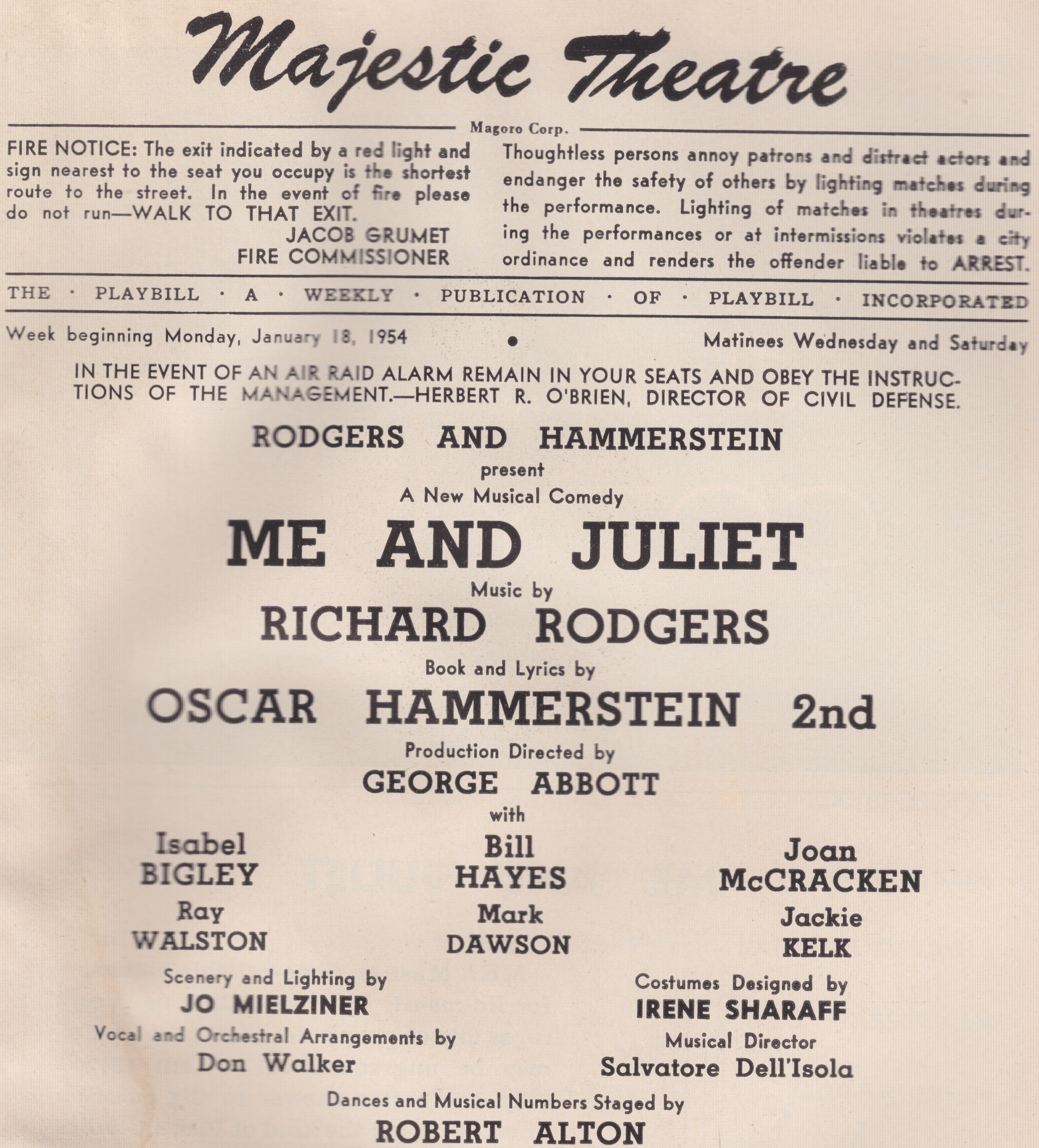
First credits from Me and Juliet 's playbill

The musical opened on Broadway on May 28, 1953, at the Majestic Theatre. Large advance sales guaranteed a considerable run; by the start of November, it had paid back its advance, and closed after 358 performances, paying a small profit to RCA. Thomas Hischak, in his The Rodgers and Hammerstein Encyclopedia, suggests that business fell off after the advance sales were exhausted "because audiences had come to expect more from a Rodgers and Hammerstein musical". According to Frederick W. Nolan in his book about the duo's works,

[D]espite a $500,000 advance sale, (Note: US$500,000 in 1953 is equivalent to $6,017,000 in 2025, according to calculations based on the consumer price index measure of inflation.) despite a ten-month run (which, for anyone except Rodgers and Hammerstein, would have represented a major success), and despite an eventual profit in excess of $100,000, (Note: US$100,000 in 1953 is equivalent to $1,203,000 in 2025, according to calculations based on the consumer price index measure of inflation.) Me and Juliet has to be classed as a failure.

The backstage drama portrayed in the musical was matched by actual difficulties among the cast. McCracken, who played Betty, was the wife of choreographer Bob Fosse and became pregnant during the run. Bill Hayes later wrote that she lost her baby through miscarriage about the same time she lost her husband to Gwen Verdon. The baby was in fact aborted, because the pregnancy would have endangered McCracken's health as a result of her diabetes. Hayes noted that in the fifteen months he played Larry, he did not recall ever having a conversation with Isabel Bigley, who was supposedly his love interest and wife: "I doubt that the audience ever believed we were deeply in love." The show received no Tony Award nominations. During the run, Hammerstein followed his usual practice of visiting the theatre now and again to ensure that the performers were not taking liberties with his book. Upon his return, Hammerstein's secretary asked him how the show was going. The lyricist thought for a second, then said "I hate that show." According to Bill Hayes in his autobiography, Like Sands Through the Hourglass (2005):

We played nearly five hundred performances, all to full houses. Production costs were paid off and substantial profits went into the R&H till. So, though not in the same category as the storied five that were made into films - Oklahoma!, Carousel, South Pacific, The King and I and The Sound of Music - our show must be considered a success.

No national tour was attempted, but the show did have a six-week run at the Shubert Theatre in Chicago in spring 1954. Rodgers & Hammerstein, with their spouses, attended the opening night performance. Among those who played in the chorus during the New York run was future star Shirley MacLaine; Shirley Jones was a chorus girl in the Chicago performances, and she at least once substituted for an indisposed Isabel Bigby, "downed with a virus." Subsequent productions include one by Kansas City's Starlight Theatre in 1955. Equity Library Theatre produced it in New York in 1970; it returned to that city, though not to Broadway, in 2002 with the York Theatre. A London production was presented by the Finborough Theatre in 2010 in a fifty-seat theatre; the production was billed as the show's European premiere.

== Musical numbers ==
Act 1

- "A Very Special Day" – Jeanie and trio
- "That's the Way It Happens" – Jeanie and trio
- "That's the Way It Happens" (Reprise) – Larry
- "Dance Impromptu" – Chorus, George, and trio
- "Overture to Me and Juliet" – Dario and orchestra
- "Opening of Me and Juliet" – Lily, Jim, Susie, and Charlie
- "Marriage Type Love" – Charlie, Lily, and singers
- "Keep It Gay" – Bob, Jim, and chorus
- "Keep it Gay" (Reprise) – Betty and Buzz
- "The Big Black Giant" – Larry
- "No Other Love" – Jeanie and Larry
- "Dance" – Ralph, Francine, and Elizabeth
- "The Big Black Giant" (Reprise) – Ruby
- "It's Me" – Betty and Jeanie
- "First Act Finale" – Lily, Betty, Charlie, Jim, Jeanie, and chorus

Act 2

- "Intermission Talk" – Herbie and chorus
- "It Feels Good" – Bob
- "We Deserve Each Other" [Sequence in Second Act of Me and Juliet] – Betty, Jim, and dancers
- "I'm Your Girl" – Jeanie and Larry
- "Second Act Finale" – Charlie, Lily, Betty, Jim, and chorus
- "Finale" – Company

== Musical treatment and recording ==
One source of Rodgers's excitement for the concept that became Me and Juliet was his view that a contemporary musical gave him the opportunity for a contemporary score. At the time Rodgers wrote the score, a Latin dance craze had swept the United States, and its influence found its way into the music for Me and Juliet. Rodgers put an onstage jazz trio in the production and encouraged the members to improvise. Among the trio was jazz artist Barbara Carroll as Chris, rehearsal pianist. "Intermission Talk", the chatter among audience members early in the second act, is given a bouncy melody and sly references to a number of shows then on Broadway—including the duo's own The King and I. According to author and composer Ethan Mordden, Rodgers's score "found [Rodgers & Hammerstein] going for impish, nimble, the sound of the Hit Parade as reimagined by [them]".

Rodgers borrowed the music for "No Other Love," a tango, from his award-winning score for Victory at Sea. RCA, which had those rights, arranged for Perry Como to record the song, and it was rushed onto the market to coincide with the show's Broadway opening. The record became a number-one hit for Como on the Disc Jockey chart, though #2 as a best seller, remaining on the charts for 22 weeks.

Hischak described the original cast album as "surprisingly lively and mostly enjoyable for a musical that was considered so dull on stage." He pointed to "Intermission Talk" as a number which probably works better in a recording than on stage and states that "there is no mistaking the hypnotic power of 'No Other Love'". The original cast recording was released on compact disc in 1993.

== Critical reception and assessment ==
The musical received neutral-to-unfavorable reviews from critics. The New York Times critic Brooks Atkinson praised the acting and choreography, but stated, "This is their Valentine to show business, expressed in the form of a show-within-a-show; and it has just about everything except an intelligible story." Herald-Tribune critic Walter Kerr noted that "Rodgers and Hammerstein have come perilously close to writing a show-without-a-show." George Jean Nathan of the Journal American stated that "Hammerstein's book has the effect of hanging idly around waiting for an idea to come to him." Robert Coleman of the Daily Mirror noted, "Having set new high standards for musicals throughout the world, Rodgers and Hammerstein dipped into the lower drawer of their desk for Me and Juliet. It proved a big disappointment for this dyed-in-the-wool R. & H. fan." John Chapman of the Daily News commented, "It is at its most interesting when Jo Mielziner's sets are in motion". According to Steven Suskin in his compilation of Broadway opening night reviews, the seven major New York critics allotted the production no raves, one favorable review, one mixed, four unfavorable, and one pan.

One well-received number was "Keep It Gay", a song which in rehearsal had been assigned to several different performers before ending with Bob. The song was liked in part due to the novelty of its setting: it begins with Bob singing from the light bridge high above the stage; following a blackout the internal play performers take it up on the stage below, and following another blackout, the performers are seen in their workout clothes, at a rehearsal some weeks later. Hammerstein gave credit for the scene to Mielziner, and suggested that it demonstrated one way in which the book had affected the music.

Abbott stated that there were two reasons for what he considered to be the show's failure. The first was Rodgers and Hammerstein's overconfidence; they thought of themselves as Broadway's "Golden Boys" who could do no wrong. The other was the play-within-the-play, which had not been thoroughly thought out by anyone. According to Abbott, Hammerstein remained "positively Sphinx-like" on the subject. At a loss to understand the characters of the play-within-the play, Alton came up with nothing more than routine song-and-dance numbers. During the run, the duo approached choreographer Jerome Robbins and asked him if he could fix the dances. Robbins said that he could, but he would not, as "it would kill Bob Alton". According to Hammerstein biographer Hugh Fordin, "[the] intended contrast between onstage and backstage life was never achieved because the onstage show was so tepid and confusing."

"That's the Way it Happens" was included in the 1996 stage version of Rodgers and Hammerstein's 1945 movie musical, State Fair. According to David Lewis in his history of the Broadway musical, "The Rodgers and Hammerstein office has, it would appear, given up on [later R&H musical] Pipe Dream and [Me and] Juliet ever finding an audience ... so these songs are up for grabs." (Note: Lewis, p. 180)

Composer and author Ethan Mordden, in his book on the duo's works, wrote of the conceptual difficulties which Rodgers and Hammerstein had with the musical:

[Me and Juliet] was the first of their plays without a powerful sense of destiny, of characters consequentially interconnected. In Oklahoma!, Carousel, South Pacific and The King and I especially, the principals—whether noble or weak, just or impetuous—change each other's lives. Me and Juliet's characters appear to be thrown together by chance and—except for the lovers—will part company unaffected by each other as soon as the show closes. This left Hammerstein with nothing to seek out in his people, and Rodgers with nothing to illustrate.

== Characters and opening night cast ==
Principal characters:

- Jeanie, chorus singer — Isabel Bigley
- Bob, electrician — Mark Dawson
- Larry, assistant stage manager — Bill Hayes
- Mac, stage manager — Ray Walston
- Dario, conductor — George S. Irving
- Sidney, electrician — Edwin Phillips
- Herbie, candy counter boy — Jackie Kelk
- Ruby, company manager — Joe Lautner
- Buzz, principal dancer — Buzz Miller

Characters in "Me and Juliet" (play-within-the-play):

- Charlie (Me), featured lead — Arthur Maxwell
- Lily (Juliet), singing principal — Helena Scott
- Jim (Don Juan), principal dancer — Robert Fortier
- Susie (Carmen), principal dancer — Svetlana McLee
- Betty, successor to Susie as principal dancer — Joan McCracken
