= Salt Peanuts =

1941 jazz song by Dizzy Gillespie

"Salt Peanuts" is a bebop tune composed by Dizzy Gillespie in 1941, co-written by drummer Kenny Clarke. The song was copyrighted on October 13, 1941 and credited to both musicians. It has also been erroneously cited as a composition by Charlie Parker. Parker himself publicly credited Gillespie as the composer on May 15, 1953, as may be heard on the Jazz at Massey Hall live recording. The original lyrics have no exophoric meaning. Instead, they are a skat/bebop vocal which matches the octave note interval played predominantly throughout the song. The Pointer Sisters subsequently included vocalese lyrics for their rendition of "Salt Peanuts" as recorded on their album That's a Plenty.

== Composition ==
"Salt Peanuts" is a contrafact of "I Got Rhythm" by George and Ira Gershwin: it has the same 32-bar AABA structure and harmony, but its melody is different. It is a simple piece – "a four-measure riff phrase played twice in each A section, and a slightly more complex bridge (which incorporates the ubiquitous ♭9–7–8 figure twice)".

While the verbal exhortation "Salt Peanuts, Salt Peanuts!" is closely identified with Dizzy Gillespie, the motif upon which it is based predates Gillespie and Clarke. Glenn Miller recorded the sound-alike "WHAM (Re-Bop-Boom-Bam)" on August 1, 1941, and before this, it appeared as a repeated six-note instrumental phrase played on piano by Count Basie on his July 2, 1941, recording of "Basie Boogie". Basie also played it in a recorded live performance at Cafe Society later that year.

The refrain also appears in the song "Five Salted Peanuts" by Charlie Abbott and Bert Wheeler, recorded by both Tony Pastor & His Orchestra and The Counts & The Countess in 1945.

== Performances ==
The first known recording was by Georgie Auld, Coleman Hawkins and Ben Webster as the Auld-Hawkins-Webster Saxtet, released on the Apollo label in 1944. Bebop historian Tom Owens described the version recorded by Dizzy Gillespie and His All-Stars in May 1945 as "the definitive version". The lineup was Gillespie (trumpet), Charlie Parker (alto sax), Al Haig (piano), Curley Russell (bass), and Sid Catlett (drums).

In 1978, President Jimmy Carter sang the two-word lyric of "Salt Peanuts" with Gillespie in a White House concert. This was the first White House Jazz Concert and was the only time that a president has performed a jazz song while in office. According to Gillespie, Carter (who was also nicknamed "The Peanut Farmer") requested the song, and Gillespie responded that he would "play it if [Carter] will come up here and sing it with us."

== See also ==
- List of jazz contrafacts
- Groovin' High (Dizzy Gillespie album)
- Dispute over the definition of jazz in France in 1945 when Hugues Panassié first heard "Salt Peanuts".
