= John Raitt =

American actor and singer (1917–2005)

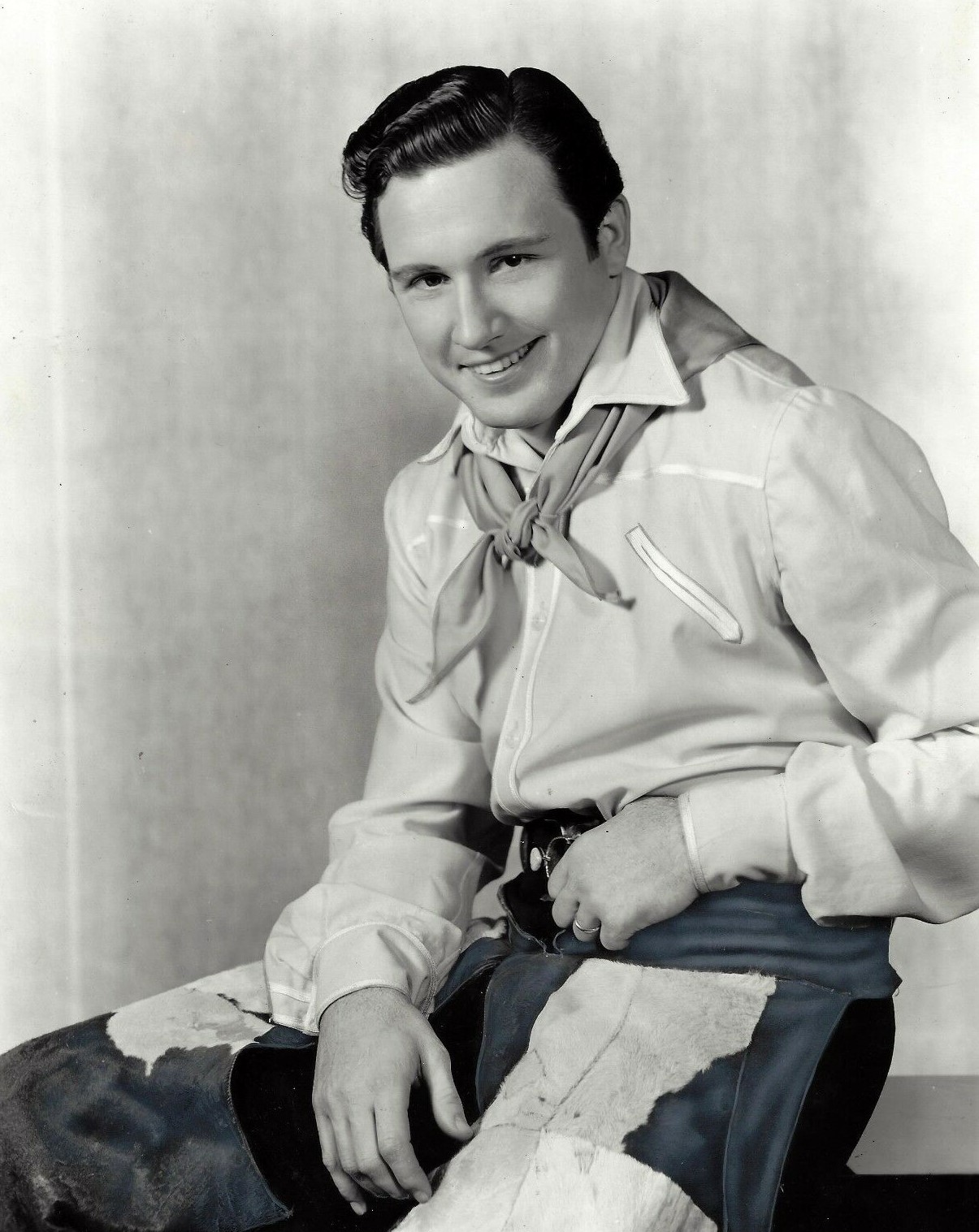
- Raitt in Oklahoma! (1945)
- Born: John Emmet Raitt; January 29, 1917; Santa Ana, California, U.S.
- Died: February 20, 2005 (aged 88); Pacific Palisades, California, U.S.
- Resting place: Anaheim Cemetery, Orange County, California
- Occupations: Actor, singer
- Years active: 1940–1992
- Spouses: Marjorie Haydock (m. 1942; div. 1971) Rosamond Smith (m. 1972; div. 1980) Rosemary Kraemer (m. 1981)
- Children: 3; including Bonnie

John Emmet Raitt (/reɪt/; January 29, 1917 – February 20, 2005) was an American actor and singer best known for his performances in musical theatre. His most notable role was Billy Bigelow in the original Broadway cast of Carousel.

== Early years ==
Raitt was born in Santa Ana, California. He got his start in theatre as a high school student at Fullerton Union High School in Fullerton, California. While there, he played in several drama productions in Plummer Auditorium. Raitt sang in the chorus of The Desert Song. (A few years before he died, Raitt again came back to the Plummer to see a rehearsal, visit students and recollect his beginnings.) He is on the school's "Wall of Fame" for his accomplishments.

In 1935, Raitt won the "football throw" at the California State High School Track and Field Championship; his mark of 220 feet remains the state record in that short-lived event. (Note: "When the discus throw was dropped from the state meet after 1932, the football throw for distance was substituted. This competition continued as a scoring event through 1938.") He was named "Athlete of the Meet" after that accomplishment. He graduated from the University of Redlands in 1939.

After graduating, he was initially inclined toward a classical concert career as a lyric baritone, using as his model the elegant Welsh baritone Thomas L. Thomas. However, after a consultation with Romano Romani, the composer, conductor, and coach who had shaped the career of soprano Rosa Ponselle, Raitt accepted that the timbre (or tone quality) of his voice was that of a tenor rather than a lyric baritone, but without the high notes of a concert tenor. As a result, he decided upon a career in popular music. During World War II, as a Quaker he did not serve in the military.

== Career ==
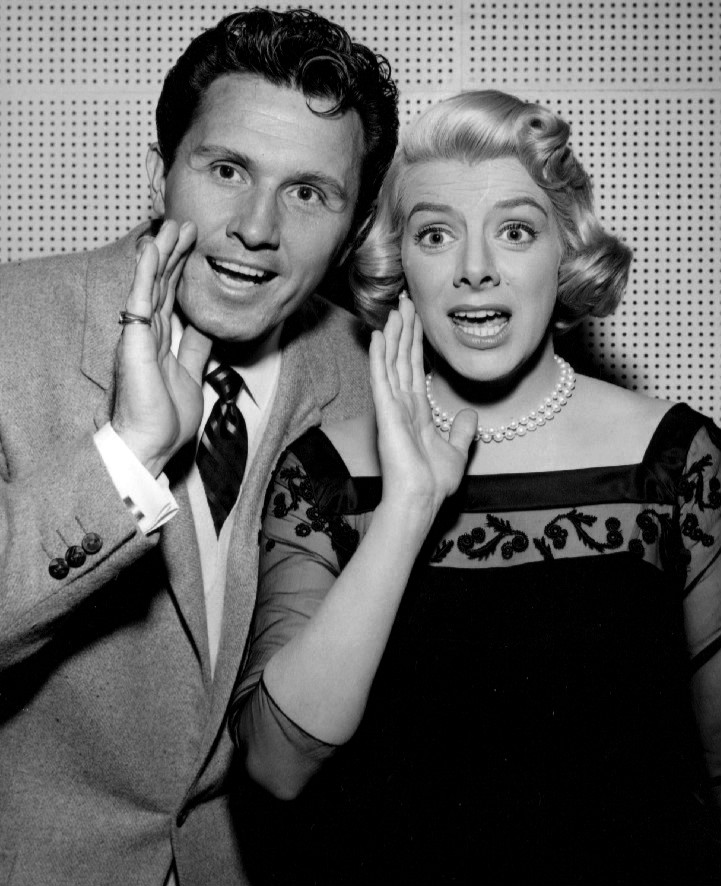
Publicity photo with Rosemary Clooney from the television program The Lux Show featuring Rosemary Clooney (1957-58)

He is best known for his stage roles in the musicals Carousel, Oklahoma!, The Pajama Game, Carnival in Flanders, Three Wishes for Jamie, and A Joyful Noise, and, in 1957, he and Mary Martin starred in the national touring version of Annie Get Your Gun. He set the standard for virile, handsome, strong-voiced leading men during the golden age of the Broadway musical. His only leading film role was in the 1957 movie version of The Pajama Game opposite Doris Day. Raitt also toured in productions of Man of La Mancha and The Music Man, portraying the leading roles in both.

On television, he was seen many times on the Bell Telephone Hour. A clip of a television performance of Raitt singing the final section of the song "Soliloquy" from Carousel is included in the documentary film Broadway: The Golden Age, by the Legends Who Were There. On September 29, 1953, he joined Jackie Gleason and Phil Foster in an appearance on the CBS panel discussion This Is Show Business. In 1957, he and Mary Martin re-created their starring roles in Annie Get Your Gun on NBC. On January 26, 1961, he appeared in the last season of NBC's The Ford Show, Starring Tennessee Ernie Ford.

Raitt appeared in the 1960 episode, "The Man on the Road", on the syndicated anthology series, Death Valley Days, hosted by Stanley Andrews. He was cast as Jim Dandy, an itinerant peddler who befriends a boy, Pete Rawson (Kevin Jones), whose father, played by House Peters, Jr., has been jailed falsely for horse theft. The episode also stars Mort Mills as Holt, a leader in the efforts to lynch the suspect. Jim Dandy devises a scheme to find the real horse thief. Raitt also manages to sing one song in this episode.

In addition, Raitt made several studio cast recordings of Broadway musicals, including Oklahoma! (as Curly), The Pajama Game (as Sid), Show Boat (as Gaylord Ravenal), and Jekyll & Hyde (as Sir Danvers).

In 1945, John Raitt was one of the recipients of the first Theatre World Award for his debut performance in Carousel. In 1965, he starred in the twentieth-anniversary production of the show at Lincoln Center for the Performing Arts. He also served as narrator on the documentary about Volunteers of America, Journey to Hope (1976).

Raitt appeared at the legendary Elitch's Theatre three times: 1976’s Shenandoah, 1977’s I Do! I Do!, and 1979’s Man of La Mancha.

In January 1992, Raitt was honored with a star on the Hollywood Walk of Fame for Live Theatre, located at 6126 Hollywood Blvd.

== Later years ==
In 1981, he found out that his high school sweetheart was widowed. Having recently divorced from his second wife, he phoned her. "Having played Zorba, I believe in grabbing at life," he recalled. "So I called her and this sweet voice answered. 'I'm free now,' I told her, 'and I'm coming to dinner.'" They married.

Raitt appeared in a 1996 cameo role in Season 1 (episode 12, "Frozen Dick") of 3rd Rock from the Sun in which he sings a portion of the title song from Oklahoma!

== Personal life ==
From his first marriage, Raitt was the father of singer Bonnie Raitt, and former father-in-law of Michael O'Keefe. He was also the father of David Raitt and Steve Raitt. Steve played in bands and then switched to designing high-end home entertainment systems in Eden Prairie in Hennepin County, Minnesota. In 2009, Steve Raitt died of cancer. Raitt's grandson, Bay Raitt, is the creator of Gollum's face for The Lord of the Rings film trilogy.

== Death ==
Raitt died on February 20, 2005, at his home in Pacific Palisades, California, from complications due to pneumonia, aged 88. He was laid to rest at Anaheim Cemetery in Orange County, California, beside his wife of 23 years, Rosemary.
