= Hernando's Hideaway =

Ross/Adler musical theatre composition

Song by Carol Haney
- Published: 1954
- Genre: Tango
- Composer: Jerry Ross
- Lyricist: Richard Adler

"Hernando's Hideaway" is a tango show tune, largely in long metre, from the musical The Pajama Game, written by Jerry Ross and Richard Adler and published in 1954. It was sung in the stage and film versions of the musical by Carol Haney. The song is about a fictional invitation-only nightclub of the same name where lovers can meet for secret rendezvous. In the few years after the song's release, a number of artists had hit recordings of it, including Archie Bleyer, Johnnie Ray, The Johnston Brothers, and Ella Fitzgerald.

== Inspiration ==
According to author Dave Hoekstra, "Hernando's Hideaway" was based on Hilltop, an establishment in East Dubuque, Illinois, that had been a speakeasy in the 1920s (where Al Capone once hid out from the Chicago police) before turning into a supper club.

== Recordings ==
The most successful recording of the song was done by Archie Bleyer, the record reaching No. 3 on the Billboard chart in 1954.

A version by Johnnie Ray hit number 11 on the UK Singles Chart in October 1955. It also reached the Billboard charts at #14.

The Johnston Brothers' 1955 recording was a No. 1 UK hit in November 1955.

A live recording (from Carnegie Hall in 1954) by Ella Fitzgerald can be found on the Verve/Polygram release Jazz at the Philharmonic, the Ella Fitzgerald Set, with Ray Brown on bass and Buddy Rich on drums.

Billy May’s Latin jazz cover recording of the song with the Rico Mambo Orchestra was included on the second album in the Ultra-Lounge series.

== Alternate versions ==
There are at least 15 Finnish versions, titled Hernandon salaisuus, by different artists of the song, the first and most popular by Olavi Virta, in 1956.

The 2000 hit song "Dance With Me" by R&B singer Debelah Morgan used the melody of "Hernando's Hideaway" in its chorus, with different lyrics. Morgan paid homage to the song by naming the club in her song's video Hernando's Hideaway.

== In movies and television ==
The instrumental section of the Johnston Brothers rendition was used as the theme for Brick Top Polford in the 2000 movie Snatch.

In 2014, contestants Jessica Richens and Zack Everhart Jr. danced to the song on the 11th season Fox dancing competition show So You Think You Can Dance. The dance's choreographer, Spencer Liff, was nominated for the Primetime Emmy Award for Outstanding Choreography in 2015 for that routine as well as two others.

Music used for Anthony Dexter and Patricia Medina in Valentino (1951).

== Legacy ==
A number of places around the world today are named Hernando's Hideaway, evidently based on the popularity of the song.

"Hernando's Hideaway" also became a nickname for the smoking room for British parliamentarians in the House of Commons. The Labour Member of Parliament, Stephen Pound, told the House during a smoking debate on February 14, 2006: "I refer the House to the dystopic hell – 'Hernando's Hideaway' – that is the Smoking Room on the Library Corridor. It is like the Raft of the Medusa most nights, with great groups of people crammed into it."

== See also ==
- List of UK Singles Chart number ones of the 1950s
