= Richard Adler =

American lyricist, writer, composer and producer (1921–2012)

- Born: August 3, 1921; New York City, U.S.
- Died: June 21, 2012 (aged 90) Southampton, New York, U.S.
- Occupations: Composer; writer; lyricist; producer
- Formerly of: Adler and Ross

Richard Adler (August 3, 1921 – June 21, 2012) was an American lyricist, writer, composer and producer of several Broadway shows. He is best known for his work with Jerry Ross on the musicals The Pajama Game (1954) and Damn Yankees (1955).

== Life and career ==
Adler was born in New York City, the son of Elsa Adrienne (née Richard) and Clarence Adler. His mother was a debutante from Mobile, Alabama. Adler had a musical upbringing, his father being a renowned concert pianist, as well as teacher of such composers as Aaron Copland. He graduated from the University of North Carolina at Chapel Hill in 1943 and served in the U.S. Naval Reserve during World War II. After his Navy service he began his career as a lyricist, teaming up with Jerry Ross in 1950. As a duo they worked in tandem, both taking credit for lyrics and music.

=== Adler and Ross years (1950–1955) ===
After establishing their partnership, Adler and Ross quickly became protégés of composer, lyricist, and publisher Frank Loesser. Their first notable composition was the song "Rags to Riches", which was recorded by Tony Bennett and reached No. 1 on the charts in late 1953.

At the same time Bennett's recording was topping the charts, Adler and Ross began their career in Broadway theater with John Murray Anderson's Almanac, a revue for which they provided most of the songs.

Adler and Ross's second Broadway effort, The Pajama Game, opened in May 1954 and was a popular as well as a critical success, winning Tony Awards as well as the Donaldson Award and the Variety Drama Critics Award. Three songs from the show were covered by popular artists and made the upper reaches of the US Hit Parade: Patti Page's version of "Steam Heat" reached No. 9; Archie Bleyer took "Hernando's Hideaway" to No. 2; and Rosemary Clooney's recording of "Hey There" made it to No. 1.

Opening almost exactly a year later, their next vehicle Damn Yankees replicated the awards and success of the earlier show. Cross-over hits from the show were "Heart" recorded by Eddie Fisher and "Whatever Lola Wants" by Sarah Vaughan.

The duo had authored the music and lyrics for three great Broadway successes in three years, and had seen more than a half-dozen of their songs reach the US Top 10, with two of them peaking at No. 1. However, their partnership was cut short when Ross died of leukemia in November 1955 at age 29.

Ross is believed to have died from complications related to the lung disease bronchiectasis.

=== Later work ===
Adler continued to write both alone and with other partners, and composed a major 1958 hit in collaboration with Robert Allen: "Everybody Loves a Lover", as recorded by Doris Day. However, after 1955 Adler had no further successes on Broadway either as a composer or a producer, although revivals of The Pajama Game and Damn Yankees have proved popular. The 1973 revival of The Pajama Game included one new Adler song, which was retained for the 2006 revival.

His later musicals included Kwamina, which he wrote for his then-wife, Sally Ann Howes, who starred in the show opposite Terry Carter. The musical centered around an interracial love story and was too controversial in a time when civil rights were hotly contested. It has not had a Broadway revival.

Adler wrote the musical Olympus 7-0000 for the show ABC Stage 67. His last original Broadway musical was 1976's Music Is (lyrics by Will Holt, music by Adler), based on Shakespeare's Twelfth Night.

In 2000, Debelah Morgan based her song "Dance With Me" on a sample of the Adler and Ross song "Hernando's Hideaway" from The Pajama Game. Adler and Ross consequently received co-composer credits on the track, which reached No. 8 on the US Billboard charts—and made Adler the unlikely 79-year-old co-composer of a 21st-century popular R&B hit.

In 2001, some Adler and Ross songs originally written for The Pajama Game and Damn Yankees were featured in the Broadway musical Fosse, about the work of Bob Fosse.

He also composed several symphonic and ballet pieces, including one to celebrate the Statue of Liberty's centennial.

Adler staged and produced several shows for U.S. presidents; the most notable of these was a 1962 Madison Square Garden birthday celebration for John F. Kennedy that included Marilyn Monroe singing a version of Happy Birthday to the president in her trademark breathy voice.

He is a member of the Songwriter's Hall of Fame.

== Personal life ==
Adler was married three times. His second marriage was to English actress Sally Ann Howes in 1958. She adopted his two sons, Andrew and Broadway lyricist Christopher, after the death of his first wife in 1964. Howes appeared in her husband's TV musical Gift of the Magi, based on the O. Henry short story of that name, and starred in his Broadway musical Kwamina. They divorced in 1966. Christopher died of AIDS-related cancer in 1984 at age 30.

Richard was a Democrat and, along with Democratic National Committee (DNC) Chairman John Bailey, Lena Horne, Carol Lawrence, Sidney Salomon, Vice-Chairwoman of the DNC Margaret B. Price, and Secretary of the DNC Dorothy Vredenburgh Bush, visited John F. Kennedy at The White House on November 20, 1963, two days prior to his assassination.

== Death ==
Adler died on June 21, 2012, at his home in Southampton, New York, at age 90. He was survived by his third wife, Susan A. Ivory; his son, Andrew; his daughter, Katherine; and his stepson, Charlie Shipman.

== Selected works ==
=== Broadway and television work ===
As composer/lyricist, unless otherwise noted:

- Stop the Music – Writer; series aired 1949 to 1956
- John Murray Anderson's Almanac – Musical December 10, 1953 – June 26, 1954 (with Jerry Ross)
- The Pajama Game – Musical, Comedy May 13, 1954 – November 24, 1956 (with Jerry Ross)
- Damn Yankees – Musical, Comedy May 5, 1955 – October 12, 1957 (with Jerry Ross)
- The Sin of Pat Muldoon – Play March 13, 1957 – March 16, 1957 (Producer only – no music in play)
- Little Women - TV musical featuring Florence Henderson, Jeannie Carson, Zina Bethune, Margaret O'Brien, and Joel Grey. October 16, 1958
- Gift of the Magi (musical) – TV musical featuring then wife Sally Ann Howes. December 9, 1958
- Kwamina – Musical. Featured then-wife Sally Ann Howes. October 23, 1961 – November 18, 1961
- A Mother's Kisses – September 21 to October 19, 1968 – three weeks of out-of-town tryouts in New Haven and Baltimore only. It was canceled before it reached Broadway. Featured Bea Arthur and Bernadette Peters
- Rex – Musical April 25, 1976 – June 5, 1976 (Producer only. Music by Richard Rogers, lyrics by Sheldon Harnick)
- Music Is – Musical comedy December 20, 1976 – December 26, 1976 (Composer only. Lyrics by Will Holt.)
- Fosse – Musical, Revue, Dance January 14, 1999 – August 25, 2001 (Includes Adler & Ross works originally written for Damn Yankees and The Pajama Game)

=== Broadway revivals ===
- The Pajama Game – December 9, 1973 – February 3, 1974
- Damn Yankees – March 3, 1994 – August 6, 1995
- The Pajama Game – February 23, 2006 – June 11, 2006 (starring Harry Connick Jr, Kelli O'Hara, Michael McKean)

=== Popular songs ===
- "Rags To Riches" (with Jerry Ross)
- "Hey, There" (with Jerry Ross)
- "Hernando's Hideaway" (with Jerry Ross)
- "Steam Heat" (with Jerry Ross)
- "Whatever Lola Wants" (with Jerry Ross)
- "Everybody Loves A Lover" (Words by Adler, music by Robert Allen)
- "Another Time, Another Place" (Words and music by Adler, from the 1961 musical Kwamina)
- "Heart" (with Jerry Ross)
- "I'm Not at All in Love" (with Jerry Ross)

== Awards, nominations and honors ==
- Tony Awards
  - 1955 Best Musical – The Pajama Game (music and lyrics)
  - 1956 Best Musical – Damn Yankees (music and lyrics)
  - 1962 Best Composer nomination – Kwamina (music)
- Four Pulitzer Nominations
- Two Donaldson Awards
- Two Variety Critics Awards
- London Evening Standard Award
- Colgate Distinguished Service Award
- Inducted into the Songwriters Hall of Fame in 1984.
- National Park Service Honorary Ranger Award
- Emmy Award
- Southampton Cultural Center Achievement Award for Theater (1993)
- University of North Carolina at Chapel Hill Lifetime Achievement Award
- ASCAP Richard Rodgers Award
- Honorary Doctorate in Music and Theater Wagner College

== Autobiography ==
- Richard Adler with Lee Davis (1990). You Gotta Have Heart. Donald I. Fine, Inc. ISBN 1-55611-201-7.
