= Jerry Ross (composer) =

American lyricist and composer (1926–1955)

- Born: Jerold Rosenberg; March 9, 1926; The Bronx, New York City, U.S.
- Died: November 11, 1955 (aged 29)
- Occupations: Lyricist, composer

Jerry Ross (born Jerold Rosenberg; March 9, 1926 – November 11, 1955) was an American lyricist and composer whose works with Richard Adler for the musical theater include The Pajama Game and Damn Yankees, winners of Tony Awards in 1955 and 1956, respectively, in both the "Best Musical" and "Best Composer and Lyricist" categories.

== Biography ==
Jerold Rosenberg was born in the Bronx, New York City, to a Russian-Jewish household, to immigrant parents, Lena and Jacob Rosenberg. Growing up, he was a professional singer and actor in the Yiddish theater.

Following high school, he studied at New York University under Rudolph Schramm. Introductions to singer Eddie Fisher and others brought him into contact with music publishers at the Brill Building, the center of songwriting activity in New York. (Fisher later had a hit with Ross’ The Newspaper Song.)

Ross met Richard Adler in 1950, and as a duo they became protégés of the great composer, lyricist, and publisher Frank Loesser. Their song Rags to Riches was recorded by Tony Bennett and reached number 1 on the charts in 1953. They also had a jazz novelty hit with Anita O'Day's recording of "No Soap, No Hope Blues".

Adler and Ross began their career in the Broadway theater with John Murray Anderson's Almanac, a revue for which they provided most of the songs (resulting in recordings of Acorn in the Meadow by Harry Belafonte and Fini by Polly Bergen). The revue opened in 1953 and ran for 229 performances.

Adler and Ross's second effort, The Pajama Game, opened on Broadway in May 1954. It was a popular as well as critical success, running for 1063 performances. The show won the 1955 Tony Award for Best Musical as well as the Donaldson Award and the Variety Drama Critics Award. Two songs from the show, "Hernando's Hideaway" (for Archie Bleyer) and "Hey There" (for Rosemary Clooney), topped the Hit Parade. Other notable songs were "Steam Heat" (choreographed on stage by Bob Fosse), "Small Talk", and "Seven and a Half Cents".

Their next musical, Damn Yankees, opened on Broadway in 1955, starring Gwen Verdon. The musical ran for 1,019 performances. Adler and Ross, as composer and lyricist, shared in the 1956 Tony Award for Best Musical. Pop hits from the show were "Heart", recorded by Eddie Fisher, and "Whatever Lola Wants" for Sarah Vaughan.

== Death ==
Jerry Ross died on November 11, 1955, at the age of 29, from complications related to the lung disease bronchiectasis. In his short life, Ross was extremely productive; he wrote, alone or in collaboration, more than 250 songs in addition to his theatre work.

Ross was entered posthumously into the Songwriters Hall of Fame in 1982, his widow, Judy, and daughter, Janie, accepting on his behalf.
