= Perillo =

Perillo is a surname. Notable people with the surname include:

- Gaetano Perillo (1897–1975), Italian politician
- Henrique Moura Perillo (born 1991), Brazilian footballer
- Jason Perillo (born 1977), American politician
- Juan Manuel Perillo (born 1985), Argentine footballer
- Justin Perillo (born 1991), American footballer
- Lucia Perillo (1958–2016), American poet
- Marconi Perillo (born 1963), Brazilian politician
- Mario Perillo (1926–2003), American businessman
- Mateo Perillo, Uruguayan rugby player
- Robert Perillo, American master voice teacher
- Steve Perillo (born 1955), businessman

== See also ==
- Perilla, a genus of plants in the mint family
- Périllos, town in France
- Pirillo, surname
