= Harry's Girls =

American TV situation comedy series (1963–1964)

- Genre: Sitcom
- Directed by: Stanley Z. Cherry; Richard Kinon; Ralph Levy
- Starring: Larry Blyden; Dawn Nickerson; Susan Silo; Diahn Williams
- Theme music composer: Stu Phillips
- Opening theme: "Harry's Girls"
- Country of origin: United States
- Original language: English
- No. of seasons: 1
- No. of episodes: 15

Production
- Executive producer: Joseph Stein
- Producer: Billy Friedberg
- Camera setup: Multi-camera
- Running time: 22–24 minutes
- Production company: MGM Television

Original release
- Network: NBC
- Release: September 13, 1963 – January 3, 1964

Harry's Girls is an American sitcom which aired on NBC from September 13, 1963 to January 3, 1964.

== Plot ==
Harry's Girls was based on the film Les Girls (1957). Harry Burns sang, danced, and managed a vaudeville troupe consisting of three young women: Lois, Rusty, and Terry. Overseeing their off-stage exploits proved exasperating for Burns, and episodes "implied that Burns and the women did not have enough talent to make it in America. None of the episodes had big-name guest stars.

== Cast ==
- Larry Blyden as Harry Burns
- Susan Silo as Rusty
- Diahn Williams as Terry
- Dawn Nickerson as Lois

== Episodes ==
| No. | Title | Directed by | Written by | Original release date |
|---|---|---|---|---|
| 1 | "The Rajah" | Richard Kinon | Unknown | September 13, 1963 |
Susan falls in love with a playboy Rajah, insisting that he has proposed marriage, but Harry sees through the charade to protect her.
| 2 | "When in Rome" | Richard Kinon | Unknown | September 20, 1963 |
The girls' opportunity to work in a Rome nightclub is jeopardized by both the Ministry of Culture and the Ministry of the Interior.
| 3 | "A Naval Affair" | Richard Kinon | Bob O'Brien | September 27, 1963 |
The American Fleet hits the Riviera, and Harry thinks he's found a way to make a bet on "a sure thing."
| 4 | "The Director" | Richard Kinon | Hal Goodman & Larry Klein | October 4, 1963 |
The girls decide they want a movie career when they're stranded in a small town where a famous Italian director is making a film.
| 5 | "Cafe on the Riviera" | Richard Kinon | Unknown | October 11, 1963 |
In the midst of Harry buying a restaurant, the girls go on strike while he hires a knife throwing act to replace them.
| 6 | "The Forgotten Man" | Richard Kinon | Unknown | October 18, 1963 |
After Harry sprains his ankle, the girls are forced to do their act without him.
| 7 | "Countess" | Richard Kinon | Unknown | October 25, 1963 |
Broke and stranded in Monte Carlo, Harry meets a statistician who says he has a system to beat the roulette wheel.
| 8 | "The Star" | Richard Kinon | Unknown | November 1, 1963 |
A fast-talking, slow-moving film producer gives Harry visions of becoming a big star.
| 9 | "Diamond Necklace" | Unknown | Unknown | November 8, 1963 |
A penniless art student gives Lois a diamond-encrusted dog collar borrowed from a stray dog. When Harry attempts to return it to police, he is jailed.
| 10 | "Made in Heaven" | Richard Kinon | Unknown | November 29, 1963 |
The girls become an "international matchmaking cartel" to find bachelor Harry a wife.
| 11 | "The Busker" | Richard Kinon | Unknown | December 6, 1963 |
Harry pays the price for attempting to help a faded musical hall celebrity who double-crossed people during his run of success.
| 12 | "Collector's Item" | Stanley Z. Cherry | Unknown | December 13, 1963 |
Harry concocts a scheme to ingratiate himself with an important booking agent.
| 13 | "His Highness" | Richard Kinon | Joseph Stein & Sid Zylenka | December 20, 1963 |
While playing at a French chateau, a plot is being hatched to restore the monarchy in France.
| 14 | "A Girl's Best Friend" | Richard Kinon | Unknown | December 27, 1963 |
Harry's romance becomes complicated when it's discovered that his girlfriend is a jewel thief.
| 15 | "Bet it All" | Richard Kinon | Unknown | January 3, 1964 |
A crooked roulette wheel seems to benefit the girls, giving them visions of an early retirement.

== Production and cancellation ==
Metro-Goldwyn-Mayer Television produced Harry's Girls, and the Colgate-Palmolive Company sponsored it. Those companies' contract specified 26 episodes, but they agreed to end the series after 15 episodes because of low ratings and lack of critical acclaim. An NBC executive cited "general agreement that the show had not lived up to expectations."

Billy Friedberg was the producer, and Stanley Z. Cherry was the director. Bob O'Brien, Joseph Stein, Sydney Zelinka, Harry Goodman, and Larry Klein were among the writers.

The series was filmed in black and white at Studios De La Victorine in Nice, France, and was broadcast on Fridays from 9:30 to 10 p.m. Eastern Time. Its competition included The Twilight Zone on CBS and The Farmer's Daughter and The Price Is Right on ABC. It was replaced by That Was the Week That Was.
