= Carol Haney =

American dancer and actress (1924–1964)

- Born: Carolyn Haney; December 24, 1924; New Bedford, Massachusetts, U.S.
- Died: May 10, 1964 (aged 39); Saddle River, New Jersey, U.S.
- Years active: 1945–1957
- Spouses: Eugene Dorian Johnson (m. 1945; div. 1953) Larry Blyden (m. 1955; div. 1962)
- Children: 2
- Awards: Tony Award for Best Featured Actress in a Musical (1955)

Carol Haney (born Carolyn Haney; December 24, 1924 – May 10, 1964) was an American dancer, actress and choreographer. After assisting Gene Kelly in choreographing films, Haney won a Tony Award for her role in Broadway's The Pajama Game, while later work as a stage choreographer earned her three Tony nominations.

== Life and career ==
Haney was born in New Bedford, Massachusetts, to Norman Vincent Haney (1899-1990), a bank teller, and his Danish-born wife, Ellen (née Christensen) Haney (1900-1952). She had an older sister, Miriam Woodcock (1922-1961). She began to dance at age five and opened a dancing school in her teens.

After high school, Haney left her home town for Hollywood and landed bit parts in movies until she was spotted by dancer/choreographer Jack Cole, becoming his dance partner and assistant from 1946 to 1948. In 1949, Haney was hired by Gene Kelly to be his assistant choreographer on several M-G-M musical films, and she aided Kelly in some of his best work, including On the Town (1949), Summer Stock (1950), An American in Paris (1951), Singin' in the Rain (1952), as well as Kelly's dream project, Invitation to the Dance (1956).

As Kelly's Dance Captain, Haney routinely worked with his partners and upon learning their strong points, choreographed numbers around them. Kelly attempted to elevate Haney's film presence, most notably by wanting her for the "Gotta Dance" sequence in Singin' in the Rain. He was continually overruled by the studio, who felt Haney lacked sufficient physical appeal.

Known as the most lithe dancer in films, Haney danced with Bob Fosse in the 1953 film version of Kiss Me, Kate. When Fosse landed his first Broadway choreographing assignment, The Pajama Game (1954), he recommended that Haney be cast in a small dancing part. She impressed director George Abbott so much that Abbott combined her role with a larger part, resulting in the character of Gladys Hotchkiss, showcasing her in two specialty dance numbers "Steam Heat" and "Hernando's Hideaway". The role shot Haney to Broadway fame and won her a Tony Award and two Donaldson awards. The role of Gladys was lucky for Haney's understudy, Shirley MacLaine. A month into the run of The Pajama Game, in May 1954, Haney injured her ankle during a Wednesday matinee, and MacLaine played the role. MacLaine was spotted by Hollywood producer Hal Wallis, who had come to the show to see Haney, and MacLaine got a contract that launched her film career.

After this, Haney appeared in a few shows, including the touring production Ziegfeld Follies of 1956, but developed paralyzing stage fright. She was seen on television, and she recreated her performance as Gladys in the film version of The Pajama Game (1957). She then focused her career on choreography for Broadway shows: Flower Drum Song (1958, directed by Gene Kelly), Bravo Giovanni (1962), She Loves Me (1963) and Funny Girl (1964). The American Dance Machine (1978) featured her choreography from television. Haney earned three Tony Award for Best Choreography nominations: for Flower Drum Song, Bravo Giovanni, and Funny Girl (posthumous). In May 1958, she appeared with Dick Van Dyke as a guest star on Polly Bergen's short-lived NBC variety show, The Polly Bergen Show, as well as popular game shows such as What's My Line? She demonstrated her talent as a dramatic actress in occasional stage productions such as the role of "Lila" in William Inge's A Loss of Roses, opposite newcomer Warren Beatty, who, ironically, was Shirley MacLaine's real-life brother. However, for the film version she was again passed over for a part she had originated on stage.

== Family ==
Haney was married to Eugene Dorian Johnson from 1945 to 1953 and then Broadway actor and TV host Larry Blyden from 1955 to 1962, whom she choreographed in Flower Drum Song. She and Blyden had two children, Joshua (1957–2000) and Ellen (b. 1960).

== Death ==
Haney died in Saddle River, New Jersey in 1964, at age 39, six weeks after the opening of Funny Girl, which she choreographed (and ten years to the month after she injured her ankle and was replaced by Shirley MacLaine in The Pajama Game). The cause was pneumonia, complicated by diabetes and alcoholism.

Blyden and Haney resided in the historic Achenbach House in Saddle River, New Jersey, which they believed to be haunted by the spirit of its builder. The house was later sold to tour operator Mario Perillo and was destroyed by fire in 2004.

== Filmography ==
Year	Title	Role	Notes
1945	Wonder Man	Goldwyn Girl	Uncredited
1945	Ziegfeld Follies	Ziegfeld Girl	Uncredited
1949	On the Town	Dancer in 'Day in New York' Ballet	Uncredited
1950	Summer Stock	Stock Company Member	Uncredited
1950	Tea for Two	Chorus Girl	Uncredited
1953	Kiss Me Kate	Specialty Dancer	
1956	Invitation to the Dance	Scheherazade in 'Sinbad the Sailor'	
1957	The Pajama Game	Gladys Hotchkiss	Final Film Role
