= Achenbach House =

Historic house in New Jersey, United States

- U.S. National Register of Historic Places
- New Jersey Register of Historic Places
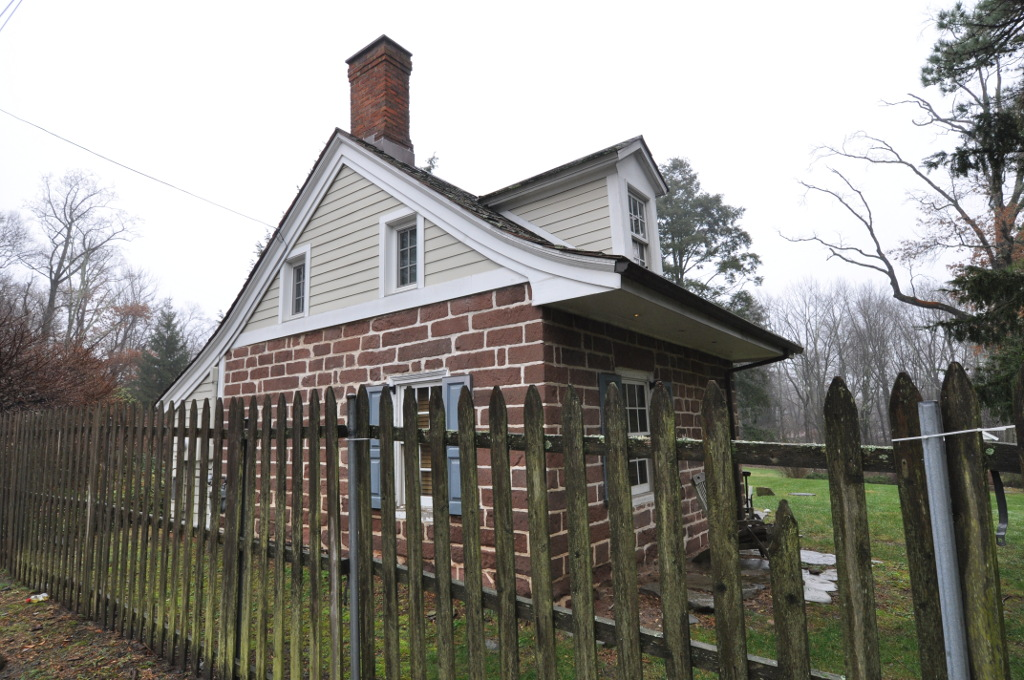
- The surviving remnant of the house, 2018

- Location within Bergen County, New Jersey Location within New Jersey Location within the United States
- Location: 184 Chestnut Ridge Road, Saddle River, New Jersey
- Coordinates: 41°2′13″N 74°4′53″W
- Area: 3 acres (1.2 ha)
- Built: c. 1757
- Built by: Johan(Hans) George Achenbach
- Architectural style: Colonial, Dutch Colonial
- MPS: Stone Houses of Bergen County TR; Saddle River MRA
- NRHP reference No.: 79001475
- NJRHP No.: 672

Significant dates
- Added to NRHP: April 18, 1979
- Designated NJRHP: October 13, 1978

The Achenbach House remains are located at 184 Chestnut Ridge Road in the borough of Saddle River in Bergen County, New Jersey, United States. The stone house was built around 1757 by Johan George Achenbach and was added to the National Register of Historic Places on April 18, 1979, for its significance in architecture. It was listed as part of the Early Stone Houses of Bergen County Multiple Property Submission (MPS) and the Saddle River MPS.

The house was the home of Larry Blyden and Carol Haney in the 1960s. It was owned (but never occupied) by travel pioneer Mario Perillo until his death in 2003, and subsequently passed on to a trust in his son Stephen Perillo's name, who is the present owner. It was largely destroyed by fire in 2004, though a portion of the original structure remains intact as a guest cottage.

== See also ==
- National Register of Historic Places listings in Saddle River, New Jersey
- National Register of Historic Places listings in Bergen County, New Jersey
