= Margie (TV series) =

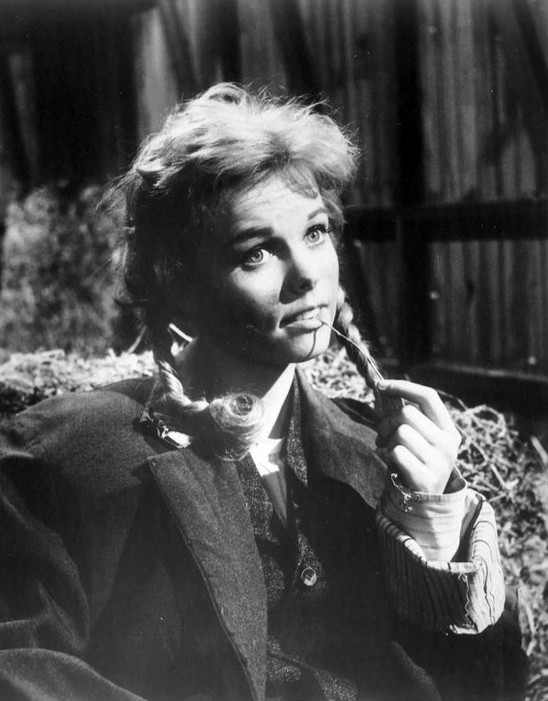
- Cynthia Pepper as Margie
- Based on: 1946 film of the same name
- Developed by: Hal Goodman; Larry Klein
- Starring: Cynthia Pepper; Penny Parker; Dave Willock; Wesley Tackitt; Tommy Ivo
- Theme music composer: Con Conrad; J. Russel Robinson; Benny Davis
- Composer: Warren Barker
- Country of origin: United States
- Original language: English
- No. of seasons: 1
- No. of episodes: 26

Production
- Producers: Hal Goodman; Larry Klein
- Running time: 30 minutes
- Production company: 20th Century Fox Television

Original release
- Network: ABC
- Release: October 12, 1961 – April 12, 1962

Margie is an American television sitcom starring Cynthia Pepper that was broadcast on ABC from October 12, 1961 to August 31, 1962.

== Premise ==
Margie was set in the Roaring Twenties. Margie Clayton lived with her parents, a little brother, and an aunt. Maybelle Jackson (her best friend) was a flapper. Two boys, Heywood Batts and Johnny Green, vied for Margie's affection. The locale was Madison, a small town "somewhere in New England".

The series was adapted from the 1946 film of the same name. Larry Klein, one of the producers, said "We have preferred to create our own family and situations rather than rely on fixed characters created by someone else." Among the differences, the film had Margie living with her grandmother because her mother had died when the title character was a little girl.

== Cast ==
- Cynthia Pepper as Margie Clayton
- Dave Willock as Harvey Clayton
- Wesley Tackitt as Nora Clayton
- Tommy Ivo as Haywood Botts
- Penney Parker as Maybelle Jackson
- Richard Gering as Johnny Green
- Hollis Irving as Aunt Phoebe
- Johnny Bangert as Cornell Clayton

== Production ==
20th Century Fox Television produced Margie's 26 episodes. They were in black-and-white, and they included a laugh track. Crest toothpaste, Prell shampoo, and Ralston-Purina were among the sponsors.

William Self was the executive producer. Harry Goodman and Klein were the producers. Among the directors were Rod Amateau, Jack Donohue, Gene Reynolds, Don Richardson, James Sheldon, and Jack Sher.

The theme song was the "Margie" (1920) by Con Conrad, Benny Davis, and J. Russel Robinson.

== Publications ==
Dell Publishing produced two issues of Margie comic books based on the TV series.

== Episodes ==
No.	Title	Directed by	Written by	Original release date
1	"The Vamp"	Jack Sher	Hal Goodman & Larry Klein	October 12, 1961
2	"County Fair"	Don Richardson	Albert E. Lewin & Burt Styler	October 19, 1961
3	"The Big Move"	Don Richardson	Albert E. Lewin & Burt Styler	October 26, 1961
4	"Pity the Poor Working Girl"	Gene Reynolds	Benedict Freedman	November 2, 1961
5	"The Initiation"	Don Richardson	Ralph Goodman	November 9, 1961
6	"The Matchmaker"	Don Richardson	Albert E. Lewin & Burt Styler	November 16, 1961
7	"The Jazz Band"	Jack Donohue	Robert Van Scoyk	November 30, 1961
8	"By the Sea"	Don Richardson	Albert E. Lewin & Burt Styler	December 7, 1961
9	"Hail the Conquered Hero"	Rod Amateau	John Bradford & Ray Brenner	December 14, 1961
10	"The New Dress"	Don Richardson	Ralph Goodman	December 21, 1961
11	"Riches to Rags"	Don Richardson	Ralph Goodman	December 28, 1961
12	"Margie Flies the Coop"	Jack Donohue	Benedict Freeman	January 4, 1962
13	"Burning Kisses"	Jack Donohue	John Bradford & Ray Brenner	January 11, 1962
14	"Madame President"	Don Richardson	Larry Rhine & Milton Pascal	January 18, 1962
15	"False Alarm"	Jack Donohue	Barbara Hammer	January 25, 1962
16	"Flaming Youth"	James Sheldon	Mel Tolkin & Leo Rifkin	February 1, 1962
17	"A Lesson in Teaching"	Don Richardson	Benedict Freedman	February 8, 1962
18	"Lady of the House"	Don Richardson	John Bradford & Ray Brenner	February 15, 1962
19	"The Dangerous Age"	Unknown	Unknown	February 22, 1962
20	"The Wolf of Wall Street"	Gene Reynolds	Arnold Horwitt	March 1, 1962
21	"Margie, the Jinx"	Gene Reynolds	Albert E. Lewin & Burt Styler	March 8, 1962
22	"Whatever Mama Wants"	Don Richardson	Laurence Marks	March 15, 1962
23	"A Woman Scorned"	Don Richardson	Arnold Horwitt	March 22, 1962
24	"Margie, the Gossip Columnist"	Don Richardson	Alan Woods	March 29, 1962
25	"Friendship is for Friends"	Don Richardson	Benedict Freedman	April 5, 1962
26	"The Professional Man"	Don Richardson	Alan Lipscott & Robert Fisher	April 12, 1962

== See also ==
- 1961-62 United States network television schedule
