= Jack Pepper =

American vaudeville dancer, singer, comedian, musician

- Publicity Photo of Jack Pepper
- Born: Edward Jackson Culpepper; June 14, 1902; Palestine, Texas, U.S.
- Died: April 1, 1979 (aged 76); Los Angeles, California, U.S.
- Occupations: Singer; dancer; comedian; musician; nightclub manager
- Spouses: Ginger Rogers (m. 1929; div. 1931) Dawn Stanton (m. 1935)
- Children: Cynthia Pepper

Jack Pepper (born Edward Jackson Culpepper; June 14, 1902 – April 1, 1979) was an American vaudeville dancer, singer, comedian, musician, and later in life a nightclub manager.

Pepper began entertaining on the vaudeville circuit in his youth with his sisters Helen and Winnie Mae. He first came to national prominence in the 1920s as part of the duo Salt and Pepper with Frank Kurtz (Salt). Pepper sang and played ukulele in a style similar to that of Cliff Edwards as well as performed comic and dance bits. Salt and Pepper appeared prominently in Broadway revues, made radio broadcasts, and recorded a number of sides for Cameo Records in the mid-1920s.

After striking out on his own, Pepper teamed with dancer Ginger Rogers as Ginger and Pepper. Rogers and Pepper were married from 1929 to 1931. Although the marriage was short, they continued to speak respectfully of each other all their lives.

The year 1929 marked Pepper's film debut in the short subject After the Show.

By his second wife, Dawn, Pepper was the father of actress Cynthia Pepper, star of the 1961 TV comedy series Margie.

In 1940, he appeared in the Bing Crosby film Rhythm on the River and Road to Singapore, the first Bob Hope–Bing Crosby "Road" picture. Drafted during World War II, he toured with the USO.

Pepper continued as a film and television character actor into the 1960s. He made three guest appearances during the 1964–1965 final season of The Jack Benny Program. He was seen with Academy Award winner Lee Marvin in the 1965 hit comedy Cat Ballou. Throughout his career, Jack Pepper appeared in 10 Bob Hope features, including the 1969 comedy How to Commit Marriage, his final role.

He was buried at the Forest Lawn, Hollywood Hills Cemetery in Los Angeles.

== Partial filmography ==
- Road to Singapore (1940) - Newspaper Columnist (uncredited)
- Rhythm on the River (1940) - Bob's cabbie (uncredited)
- Silver Canyon (1951) - Bit Role (uncredited)
- My Favorite Spy (1951) - FBI Man (uncredited)
- Son of Paleface (1952) - Restaurant Patron (uncredited)
- Just for You (1952) - Stagehand (uncredited)
- Stop, You're Killing Me (1952) - The Singer
- Off Limits (1952) - Bartender (uncredited)
- Trouble Along the Way (1953) - Irish Tenor / Pianist in Saloon (uncredited)
- A Star Is Born (1954) - Chef (uncredited)
- The Seven Little Foys (1955) - Theater Manager (uncredited)
- Lucy Gallant (1955) - Minor Role (uncredited)
- Anything Goes (1956) - Man (uncredited)
- That Certain Feeling (1956) - Extra (uncredited)
- Beau James (1957) - Politician (uncredited)
- Man on Fire (1957) - Club Member (uncredited)
- I Married a Woman (1958) - Crawford (uncredited)
- Once Upon a Horse... (1958) - Roulette Croupier (uncredited)
- The Five Pennies (1959) - Ship Worker (uncredited)
- Bachelor in Paradise (1961) - Floor Man (uncredited)
- Papa's Delicate Condition (1963) - Joe (uncredited)
- Critic's Choice (1963) - 1st Baseman (uncredited)
- The Incredible Mr. Limpet (1964) - Sport Fishermen (uncredited)
- Cat Ballou (1965) - Banjo Player
