= Larry Blyden =

American game show host (1925–1975)

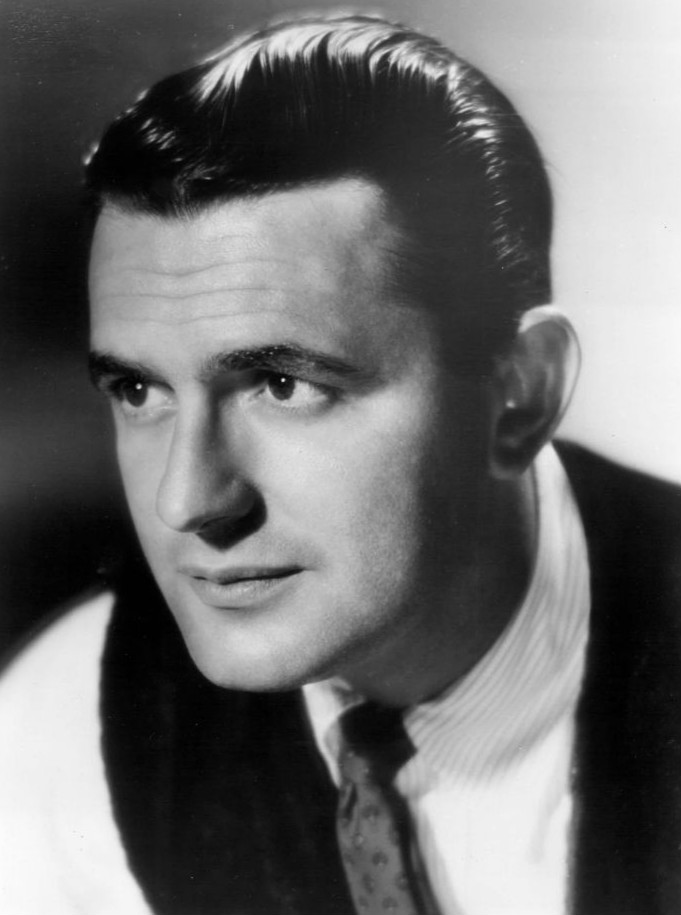
- Blyden in 1962
- Born: Ivan Lawrence Blieden; June 23, 1925; Houston, Texas, U.S.
- Died: June 6, 1975 (aged 49); Agadir, Morocco
- Resting place: Forest Park Lawndale Cemetery
- Education: Southwestern Louisiana Institute; University of Houston; Stella Adler Studio of Acting
- Occupations: Actor, stage producer and director, game show host
- Years active: 1948–1975
- Spouse: Carol Haney (m. 1955; div. 1962)
- Children: 2

Ivan Lawrence Blieden (June 23, 1925 – June 6, 1975), known professionally as Larry Blyden, was an American actor, stage producer, and director, and game show host. He made his Broadway stage debut in 1948 and went on to appear in numerous productions on and off Broadway. In 1972, he won the Tony Award for Best Featured Actor in a Musical for his performance in the revival of A Funny Thing Happened on the Way to the Forum, which he also produced. That same year, he became the host of the syndicated revival version of What's My Line?.

At the time of his death, Blyden was slated to host a new game show, Showoffs. He died of injuries sustained in a single-car accident while vacationing in Morocco on June 6, 1975.

== Early life ==
Blyden was born to Adolph and Marian (née Davidson) Blieden in Houston, Texas, and raised in the Jewish faith. As a child, he attended Wharton Elementary School and Sidney Lanier Junior High School.

His neighbor Elmore Torn also became an actor, Rip Torn. The Blieden and Torn families were friends; the Blieden family name was pronounced "bleedin'", giving rise to a family joke. As Blyden recalled, when Rip and Larry's fathers introduced themselves, Torn would announce, "I'm Torn and he's Blieden."

Blyden became interested in acting at a young age and made his stage debut in a production headed by Margo Jones when he was 14 years old. After graduating from Lamar High School, Blyden attended Southwestern Louisiana Institute for a year before enlisting in the U.S. Marine Corps during World War II, rising to the rank of second lieutenant. After leaving the service in 1946, he enrolled at the University of Houston. While in college, Blyden worked as an announcer for KPRC radio and performed at the Alley Theatre and Houston Little Theater. After graduating with a Bachelor of Arts in 1948, Blyden moved to New York City to pursue an acting career.

== Career ==
=== Stage and films ===
While in New York, Blyden again worked in radio and studied acting at the Stella Adler Studio of Acting for eighteen months. While starring in a showcase of The Importance of Being Earnest, he was spotted by director Joshua Logan who cast him in a small role in the Broadway production of Mister Roberts. He was then cast in the larger role of "Ensign Pulver", and remained with the production until 1951. His second Broadway role was that of "Schmutz" in the original production of Wish You Wish Here. In 1958, Blyden replaced Larry Storch as "Sammy Fong" in the out-of-town tryouts for the musical Flower Drum Song. He remained in the role during the show's original Broadway run for which he was nominated for a Tony Award for Best Actor in a Musical. The show was choreographed by his then-wife, Carol Haney. That same year, he appeared in You Can't Take It with You, at Expo 58 (also known as Brussels World's Fair).

In November 1962, Blyden tried his hand at stage directing in the Broadway production of Harold, starring Anthony Perkins and Don Adams. The production closed after twenty performances. In February 1967, Blyden replaced Martin Balsam in the Broadway production of You Know I Can't Hear You When the Water's Running. Blyden's second stage directing effort was the play The Mother Lover, in which he also starred. The production also featured Eileen Heckart and Valerie French and premiered at the Booth Theatre on February 1, 1969. In March 1972, he portrayed the role of "Hysterium" in the revival of A Funny Thing Happened on the Way to the Forum, starring Phil Silvers, which Blyden also produced. He won the Tony Award for Best Featured Actor in a Musical for his work in the play.

In 1974, Blyden appeared as "Dionysos" with the Yale Repertory Theatre in the musical comedy The Frogs, in New Haven, Connecticut. The play was written by Burt Shevelove, and based on a play written by Aristophanes in 405 B.C. The play's music and lyrics were composed by Stephen Sondheim. Blyden's final stage role was that of "Sidney" in Alan Ayckbourn's comedy Absurd Person Singular, for which he was nominated for a Drama Desk Award for Outstanding Featured Actor in a Play and a Tony Award for Best Actor in a Play. He remained with the production for 250 performances.

Over the course of his career, Blyden appeared in three feature films. He made his film debut in a supporting role in the 1957 drama The Bachelor Party, starring Don Murray. He also had supporting roles in Kiss Them for Me (1957) and On a Clear Day You Can See Forever (1970), starring Barbra Streisand.

=== Television ===
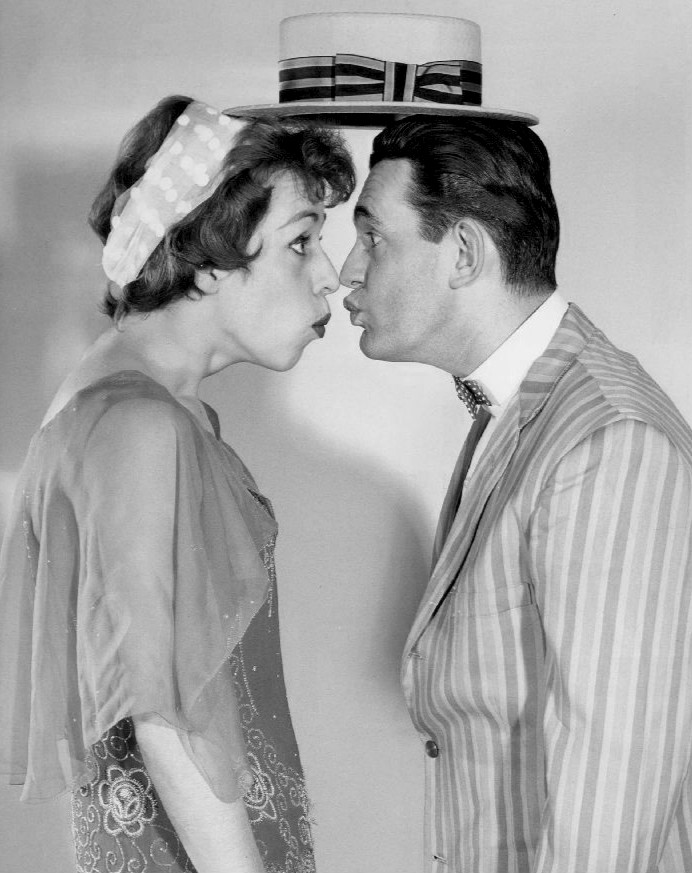
Carol Burnett and Larry Blyden on The Garry Moore Show (1960)

In addition to stage and occasional film work, Blyden also appeared in guest spots for television shows. In the 1950s, he made guest performances on several dramatic anthology shows including Playhouse 90, Omnibus, The Loretta Young Show and The United States Steel Hour. In May 1955, CBS announced that Blyden was set to star opposite Nita Talbot in the sitcom Joe and Mabel. The series, which was based on the radio series of the same name that had aired on the NBC Red Network from February 1941 to September 1942, was scheduled to premiere on September 20, 1955. Production began that summer but was hampered by the Screen Actors Guild strike that began on August 5, 1955. Although the strike lasted just ten days, production on the series ceased. Production eventually resumed but the series was plagued with various issues and, upon being previewed for critics, was poorly received. CBS eventually decided to burn off the series' thirteen completed episodes during the summer of 1956 after which it was canceled.

After the cancelation of Joe and Mabel, Blyden returned to stage work (replacing Ray Walston in the Philadelphia and Broadway runs of Who Was That Lady I Saw You With? and Flower Drum Song). He returned to television in 1959 as "Sammy Glick" in the television adaptation of Budd Schulberg's 1941 novel What Makes Sammy Run? The two-part special aired on the NBC Sunday Showcase on September 27 and October 4, 1959, and also starred John Forsythe, Dina Merrill and Barbara Rush.

In the early 1960s, Blyden returned to television with guest starring roles in two episodes of The Twilight Zone: "A Nice Place to Visit" in April 1960 and "Showdown with Rance McGrew" in February 1962 in which he starred as the title character. In 1963, Blyden was cast to star in a second sitcom, NBC's Harry's Girls. Produced by MGM Television, the series was an adaptation of the Robert E. Sherwood play Idiot's Delight, with Blyden starring as Harry, a vaudeville style performer constantly getting into trouble and falling in love. The series received a great deal of publicity before it aired because it was being filmed on location in Europe (interiors were filmed at the Victorine Studios in France while exteriors were shot on location in Rome, Paris and other European locations). Upon its debut, Harry's Girls was also not well received and was canceled after one season. For the remainder of the decade, Blyden continued with guest roles on television including spots on Alfred Hitchcock Presents, The Defenders, The Fugitive, and The Man from U.N.C.L.E.

In the late 1960s, Blyden began working as a game show host and master of ceremonies starting with Personality in June 1967. In 1969, he hosted You're Putting Me On and The Movie Game.

In 1972, Blyden took over hosting duties for the syndicated revival of the game show What's My Line?. He remained the show's host until Goodson-Todman discontinued production on December 12, 1974. During the same year, Blyden also appeared as a guest panelist on the Goodson-Todman daytime CBS game show Match Game '74.

In the weeks before his death, Blyden was involved in several major projects. He co-hosted the 29th Tony Awards telecast that aired on ABC on April 20, 1975. On May 2, Blyden reprised his role as Ensign Pulver opposite Henry Fonda at a gala tribute to director Joshua Logan at Broadway's Imperial Theatre (which was recorded and eventually released on a privately distributed LP album). He also narrated a segment of CBS's Bicentennial Minute which aired during primetime the evening of May 30.

On May 6, 1975, Blyden left the production of Absurd Person Singular after he was hired to host a new game show entitled Showoffs, a video version of the parlor-game charades. The project began unhappily, owing to "Larry's phobia about not wasting time and Mark Goodson's total disregard of time when he is in the throes of the creative process." On May 24, 1975, the day the pilot episode was taped, Blyden was furious that studio delays forced him to miss his daughter's graduation play, but he remained professional and hosted the pilot.

== Personal life ==
Blyden married actress and dancer Carol Haney on April 17, 1955, in Las Vegas. The couple had two children: Joshua and Ellen Rachel. Blyden and Haney were divorced in 1962.

During their marriage, Blyden and Haney purchased the historic Achenbach House in Saddle River, New Jersey, which they believed to be haunted by the spirit of its builder. After Haney's death in 1964, Blyden inherited the home and became convinced that her own spirit was haunting the house. Blyden later told a friend that in the months after Haney's death, the house was filled with the smell of brownies baking which had been Haney's favorite. Blyden told his friend that after he yelled at Haney to leave him alone, the smell instantly vanished. The house was later sold to tour operator Mario Perillo and was destroyed by fire in 2004.

== Death ==
Before production was set to begin on Showoffs, Blyden was granted a two-week vacation and decided to fly to Marrakesh, Morocco. While he was driving near Agadir on May 31, Blyden's rental car reportedly went off the road and overturned. According to Blyden's manager, Blyden suffered injuries to the chest, head and abdomen. He underwent surgery, but died of his injuries on June 6, 1975, at age 49. Blyden's body was flown back to the United States on June 13. A memorial was held on June 20, after which he was buried at Forest Park Lawndale Cemetery in Houston.

== Broadway appearances ==
Date	Production	Role	Notes
February 18, 1948 – January 6, 1951	Mister Roberts	Shore Patrol Officer; Ensign Pulver	Replacement (Ensign)
June 25, 1952 – November 28, 1953	Wish You Were Here	Itchy Flexner	Understudy (Flexner), Replacement (Schmutz)
December 17, 1953 – November 13, 1954	Oh, Men! Oh, Women!	Grant Cobble	
March 3 – August 30, 1958	Who Was That Lady I Saw You With?	Michael Haney	Replacement
December 1, 1958 – May 7, 1960	Flower Drum Song	Sammy Fong	Nominated: Tony Award for Best Actor in a Musical
November 29 – December 15, 1962	Harold	–	Director
February 16 – April 18, 1964	Foxy	Doc	
November 11, 1964 – January 7, 1967	Luv	Milt Manville	Replacement
October 18, 1966 – November 25, 1967	The Apple Tree	Snake, Balladeer, Narrator	
March 13, 1967 – January 4, 1969	You Know I Can't Hear You When the Water's Running	Chuck, George, Richard Pawling	Replacement
February 1, 1969	The Mother Lover	Seymour	Director
March 30 – August 12, 1972	A Funny Thing Happened on the Way to the Forum	Hysterium	Producer; Tony Award for Best Featured Actor in a Musical
October 8, 1974 – May 6, 1975	Absurd Person Singular	Sidney	Nominated: Drama Desk Award for Outstanding Featured Actor in a Play; Tony Award for Best Actor in a Play

== Television ==
Year	Title	Role	Notes
1950	The Silver Theatre		Episode: "Never Hit a Pigeon"
1950	The Philco-Goodyear Television Playhouse		2 episodes
1952–1954	Armstrong Circle Theatre		3 episodes
1954	Goodyear Television Playhouse		Episode: "Suitable for Framing"
1955	Star Tonight		Episode: "Zone of Quiet"
1955	The Elgin Hour	Harrison B. Harrison	Episode: "The $1,000 Window"
1956	Playwrights '56	Sargeant Barney Bender	Episode: "Sometimes You Get Rich"
1956	Joe and Mabel	Joe Sparton	13 episodes
1956–1957	Studio One in Hollywood	Various	2 episodes
1957	Playhouse 90	Various	2 episodes
1957	The Alcoa Hour	Ralph	Episode: "He's for Me"
1957	Kraft Television Theatre		Episode: "The Old Ticket"
1957	Kiss Them for Me	Mississip	
1958	DuPont Show of the Month	Dr. Sanderson	Episode: "Harvey"
1958	Armchair Theatre	Krupp	Episode: "Time of Your Life"
1958–1962	The United States Steel Hour	Various	6 episodes
1959–1960	NBC Sunday Showcase	Sammy Glick	Episodes: "What Makes Sammy Run? (Part 1 & 2)" "One Clear Voice"
1959–1960	The Play of the Week	Various	3 episodes
1960	The Chevy Mystery Show	Peter Meinecke	Episode: "The Machine Calls It Murder"
1960	Moment of Fear		Episode: "Conjure Wife"
1960	The Witness	Bugsy Siegel	Episode: "Bugsy Siegel"
1960	Omnibus	Teddy Roosevelt	Episode: "He Shall Have Power"
1960–1962	The Twilight Zone	Henry Francis Valentine, Rance McGrew	Episodes: "A Nice Place to Visit", "Showdown with Rance McGrew"
1961	Thriller	Ralphie Teal	Episode: "Choose a Victim"
1961	The Loretta Young Show	Various	2 episodes
1961	Target: The Corruptors!	Chuck Baxter	Episode: "The Golden Carpet"
1961	General Electric Theater	Johnny Henderson	Episode: "Call to Danger"
1962	Cain's Hundred	Jay Adams	Episode: "Blood Money"
1962	Adventures in Paradise	Charlie Vale	Episode: "The Dream Merchant"
1962	The Dick Powell Show	Lou Marks	Episode: "Tomorrow, the Man"
1962	Sam Benedict	Mort Friedman	Episode: "Hear the Mellow Wedding Bells"
1963	The DuPont Show of the Week	Corporal William Yarrow	Episode: "Two Faces of Treason"
1963–1964	Harry's Girls	Harry Burns	15 episodes
1964	Route 66	Cam Wilcox	Episode: "Like This It Means Father..."
1964	The Reporter	Al Swan	Episode: "Murder by Scandal"
1947	Dr. Kildare	Eddie Hiller	Episode: "Take Care of My Little Girl"
1965	The Alfred Hitchcock Hour	Walter Mills/Philip Marshall	Episode: "Wally the Beard"
1965	12 O'Clock High	Lt. Tony Kemp	Episode: "Mutiny at Ten Thousand Feet"
1965	The Defenders	Charles Parker	Episode: "The Prosecutor"
1965	Kraft Suspense Theatre	Lester Pennell	Episode: "Twixt the Cup and the Lip"
1965	The Fugitive	Sal Mitchell	Episode: "Crack in a Crystal Ball"
1965	Slattery's People	Martin Keiller	Episode: "The Hero"
1966	The Man from U.N.C.L.E.	George Dennell	Episode: "The Waverly Ring Affair"
1967	ABC Stage 67	Todd Bronson	Episode: "Olympus 7-0000"
1967	Ghostbreakers	Waldo Kent	Television movie
1970	On a Clear Day You Can See Forever	Warren Pratt	
1970	The F.B.I.	Frank Colling	Episode: "The Innocents"
1971	The Mod Squad	Bob Hardy	Episode: "Exit the Closer"
1972	Medical Center	Dr. Lieber	Episode: "Terror"
1972	Cannon	Phil Dobson	Episode: "The Torch"
1974	The Wide World of Mystery	Daniel	Episode: "The Satan Murders"

== Notes ==
Media offices
Preceded by Wally Bruner	Host of What's My Line? 1972–1975	Succeeded by Program cancellation
