= Dave Willock =

American actor (1909–1990)

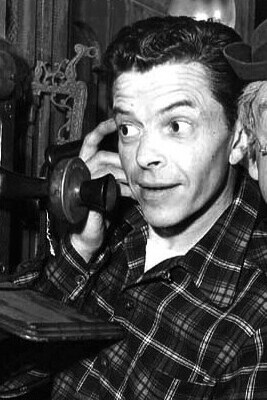
- Willock on Dave and Charley, 1952
- Born: David Willock; August 13, 1909; Chicago, Illinois, U.S.
- Died: November 12, 1990 (aged 81); Los Angeles, California, U.S.
- Other name: Dave "Tugwell" Willock
- Occupation: Actor
- Years active: 1931–1979
- Spouse: Lota B. Butler (m. 1934)
- Children: 5

David Willock (August 13, 1909 – November 12, 1990) was an American character actor. He appeared in 181 films and television series from 1939 to 1979.

== Biography ==
Born in 1909, Willock began his professional career in vaudeville in 1931, teaming with his boyhood friend Jack Carson in a comedy song and dance routine. For a time in the mid-1930s, he was a reporter and editor for a Milwaukee newspaper. He first appeared on screen in Good Girls Go to Paris (1939), in an uncredited bit part.

He teamed with Carson again when Carson invited him to write for his radio show; Willock wrote and played the part of Carson's nephew Tugwell on The Jack Carson Show from 1943 to 1949. Willock and Cliff Arquette had their own radio and television shows in the early 1950s. Both versions were called Dave and Charley; the radio version was heard circa 1950, but the television version of it was on the air for only three months in early 1952. He appeared on television in S2 E15 of "Wanted:Dead or Alive" as Jethro Dane in "Chain Gang" which aired 12/10/1959.

In the 1961–1962 season, he played Harvey Clayton, father of the 1920s teenager Margie Clayton, portrayed by Cynthia Pepper in ABC's Margie. He appeared on an episode of Dragnet as an ex-vaudevillean who is cheated out of $9,000 that he found on a sidewalk. In 1966, he had an uncredited role as the bartender in the Elvis Presley vehicle Frankie and Johnny. Willock is probably most familiar to modern audiences from his performance as Baby Jane Hudson's father in the opening scenes of the cult classic What Ever Happened to Baby Jane? (1962). He appeared in two episodes of The Cara Williams Show with Cara Williams in 1964 and 1965 and played seven different characters on CBS's Green Acres with Eddie Albert and Eva Gabor, mostly portraying clerks or elevator operators.

Willock did voice acting for animated series, such as the offscreen narrator on Wacky Races (1968) and as father Augustus "Gus" Holiday on The Roman Holidays (1972). Willock appeared in a classic 1970 television commercial for "The Great American Soups", directed by American satirist Stan Freberg, alongside tap-dancing star Ann Miller.

== Death ==
Willock died of complications due to a stroke on November 12, 1990, at the age of 81. He is buried in Valhalla Memorial Park Cemetery. For his contribution to the television industry, Willock has a star on the Hollywood Walk of Fame at 6358 Hollywood Boulevard.

== Selected filmography ==
- Three Texas Steers (1939) – Hotel Desk Clerk (uncredited)
- S.O.S. Tidal Wave (1939) – Page (uncredited)
- Good Girls Go to Paris (1939) – Student (uncredited)
- Blondie Takes a Vacation (1939) – Hotel Desk Clerk (uncredited)
- Golden Boy (1939) – Arena Call Boy (uncredited)
- Three Sons (1939) – Stock Boy (uncredited)
- Mr. Smith Goes to Washington (1939) – Senate Guard (uncredited)
- Little Accident (1939) – Attendant (uncredited)
- Legion of Lost Flyers (1939) – Blinky, the Radioman
- The Amazing Mr. Williams (1939) – Bellboy (uncredited)
- Brother Rat and a Baby (1940) – Talking Cadet in Trouble (uncredited)
- Granny Get Your Gun (1940) – The Timid Driver (uncredited)
- Honeymoon Deferred (1940) – Steward (uncredited)
- Framed (1940) – News Photographer (uncredited)
- Black Friday (1940) – Student (uncredited)
- Too Many Husbands (1940) – Elevator Operator (uncredited)
- Argentine Nights (1940) – Steward (uncredited)
- Honeymoon for Three (1941) – Hotel Porter (uncredited)
- The Monster and the Girl (1941) – Charlie, Photographer (uncredited)
- Mr. District Attorney (1941) – Hypo (uncredited)
- A Shot in the Dark (1941) – Elevator Operator (uncredited)
- The People vs. Dr. Kildare (1941) – Father (uncredited)
- She Knew All the Answers (1941) – Messenger Boy
- Caught in the Draft (1941) – Colonel's Orderly (uncredited)
- Cracked Nuts (1941) – Radio Technician (uncredited)
- Never Give a Sucker an Even Break (1941) – Assistant Director Johnson (uncredited)
- Great Guns (1941) – Recruit at Target Practice (uncredited)
- Niagara Falls (1941) – Bellboy (uncredited)
- The Chocolate Soldier (1941) – Messenger Boy with Flowers (uncredited)
- Louisiana Purchase (1941) – Bellhop (uncredited)
- Hellzapoppin' (1941) – Orchestra Trombone Player (uncredited)
- Playmates (1941) – Tommy (uncredited)
- The Fleet's In (1942) – Sailor (uncredited)
- Frisco Lil (1942) – Jamison, Law Student (uncredited)
- The Mad Doctor of Market Street (1942) – Band Leader (uncredited)
- The Male Animal (1942) – Student in Bookstore (uncredited)
- To the Shores of Tripoli (1942) – Sailor in Car (uncredited)
- Two Yanks in Trinidad (1942) – Messenger (uncredited)
- This Time for Keeps (1947) – Soda Jerk (uncredited)
- Take a Letter, Darling (1942) – Proprietor's Son (uncredited)
- Sunday Punch (1942) – Milkman (uncredited)
- Yankee Doodle Dandy (1942) – Stage Manager, 'Peck's Bad Boy' (uncredited)
- The Affairs of Martha (1942) – Milkman (uncredited)
- Wings for the Eagle (1942) – Slim (uncredited)
- Priorities on Parade (1942) – Push Gasper
- Flying Tigers (1942) – Jim's Aide (uncredited)
- For Me and My Gal (1942) – Elevator Operator (uncredited)
- Lucky Jordan (1942) – Angelo Palacio
- You Were Never Lovelier (1942) – Hotel Acuña Bellboy (uncredited)
- Ice-Capades Revue (1942) – Guide (uncredited)
- Over My Dead Body (1942) – Sailor
- The Hard Way (1943) – Tommy, Bellhop (uncredited)
- Dixie Dugan (1943) – Phil (uncredited)
- He Hired the Boss (1943) – Sailor (uncredited)
- She Has What It Takes (1943) – Cab Driver (uncredited)
- Action in the North Atlantic (1943) – Convoy Speaker (uncredited)
- Let's Face It (1943) – Barney Hilliard
- Princess O'Rourke (1943) – Delivery Boy (uncredited)
- The Gang's All Here (1943) – Sergeant Pat Casey
- Four Jills in a Jeep (1944) – Heckling Soldier (uncredited)
- Pin Up Girl (1944) – Dud Miller
- Wing and a Prayer (1944) – Ensign Hans Jacobson
- She's a Sweetheart (1944) – Wes
- Bring on the Girls (1945) – Sailor (uncredited)
- It's a Pleasure (1945) – Elevator Man (uncredited)
- It's in the Bag! (1945) – Stratosphere Balcony Usher (uncredited)
- Pride of the Marines (1945) – Red (uncredited)
- This Love of Ours (1945) – Dr. Dailey
- Spellbound (1945) – Bellboy (uncredited)
- Joe Palooka, Champ (1946) – Mr. Rodney
- The Runaround (1946) – Hubert 'Billy' Willis
- The Searching Wind (1946) – Harry, Male Nurse
- The Fabulous Dorseys (1947) – Foggy
- Stork Bites Man (1947) – Lester
- State of the Union (1948) – Pilot (uncredited)
- So This Is New York (1948) – Willis Gilbey
- Sealed Verdict (1948) – Stockade Desk Sergeant
- Chicago Deadline (1949) – Pig
- No Man of Her Own (1950) – Jimmy Baker (uncredited)
- Belle of Old Mexico (1950) – Tommy Mayberry
- Louisa (1950) – Joe Collins, Cab Driver
- Call Me Mister (1951) – Chet in Skit (uncredited)
- Let's Go Navy! (1951) – Algernon Hobenocker
- Darling, How Could You! (1951) – Usher (uncredited)
- Roadblock (1951) – Airport Clerk (uncredited)
- A Girl in Every Port (1952) – Seaman McGonegal (uncredited)
- Love Is Better Than Ever (1952) – Davey (uncredited)
- Just This Once (1952) – Caddie Ralph Roberts (uncredited)
- Rodeo (1952) – (uncredited)
- Jet Job (1952) – Ripple
- The Merry Widow (1952) – Marshovian Attache (uncredited)
- Just for You (1952) – Lunch Counter Man (uncredited)
- Battle Zone (1952) – Smitty
- Flat Top (1952) – Willie
- Ma and Pa Kettle on Vacation (1953) – Franklin (uncredited)
- Remains to Be Seen (1953) – Driver (uncredited)
- It Came from Outer Space (1953) – Pete Davis (uncredited)
- Roar of the Crowd (1953) – Buster Sands
- Half a Hero (1953) – Taxi Driver (uncredited)
- Revenge of the Creature (1955) – Lou Gibson
- The Delicate Delinquent (1957) – Police Cadet William C. Goerner (uncredited)
- The Buster Keaton Story (1957) – Joe Keaton
- Queen of Outer Space (1958) – Lieutenant Mike Cruze
- The Geisha Boy (1958) – GI in Korea (uncredited)
- Alfred Hitchcock Presents (1959) (Season 4 Episode 17: "Total Loss") - Frank Voss (the Insurance Investigator)
- Ten Seconds to Hell (1959) – Peter Tillig
- Wanted Dead or Alive (TV series)
  - (1959) – season 2 episode 15 (Chain gang) – Jethro Dane
  - (1960) – season 3 episode 4 (The looters) – Judge
  - (1961) – season 3 episode 15 (Baa-Baa) – George Goode
- The Ladies Man (1961) – Assistant TV Program Director (uncredited)
- What Ever Happened to Baby Jane? (1962) – Ray Hudson
- The List of Adrian Messenger (1963) – Gypsy (uncredited)
- The Nutty Professor (1963) – Purple Pit Customer (uncredited)
- Wives and Lovers (1963) – Dr. Leon Partridge DDS
- 4 for Texas (1963) – Alfred
- The Patsy (1964) – Alec (uncredited)
- Send Me No Flowers (1964, Doris Day / Rock Hudson film) – Milkman Ernie
- Hush...Hush, Sweet Charlotte (1964) – Taxi Driver
- The Disorderly Orderly (1964) – Policeman (uncredited)
- The Alfred Hitchcock Hour (1965) (Season 3 Episode 19: "Wally the Beard") - Wig Salesman
- Green Acres (1965–1970, TV Series) – Ticket Agent / Mr. Gordon / Otis Cowan / Mr. McGurney / Tom Blackwell / Larry Lawlor / George Bennington
- Frankie and Johnny (1966) – Pete (uncredited)
- The Adventures of Bullwhip Griffin (1967) – Shipping Agent (uncredited)
- The Legend of Lylah Clare (1968) – Cameraman
- The Barefoot Executive (1971) – Doorman
- The Grissom Gang (1971) – Rocky
- Now You See Him, Now You Don't (1972) – Mr. Burns
- Emperor of the North (1973) – Groundhog
- Hustle (1975) – Liquor Store Clerk
- The Streets of San Francisco (1975) (Season 3, Episode 22: "Labyrinth") - Clerk
- Lou Grant (1979, TV Series) – Phil
