= Voice teacher =

Musical instructor

A voice teacher or singing teacher is a musical instructor who assists people in the development of their abilities in singing.

== Typical work ==
A voice teacher works with a student singer to improve the various skills involved in singing.

These skills include breath control and support, tone production and resonance, pitch control and musical intonation, proper formation of vowels and consonants as well as clarity of words, blending the various high and low ranges of a voice (called "registration"), an attentiveness to musical notation and phrasing, the learning of songs, as well as good posture and vocal health. The voice teacher might operate in a private studio or be affiliated with a college or university faculty.

== Roles ==
Students usually start vocal instruction after their voices have settled in later teen years. Part of the job of any voice teacher is to know a student's vocal characteristics sufficiently well to identify their voice type. Women are usually classified in one of three categories: soprano, mezzo-soprano, and contralto. Men's voices are divided into four categories: countertenor, tenor, baritone, and bass. However, more mature and experienced singers who have completed their professional training can usually benefit from ongoing vocal instruction. At this point it is often referred to as vocal coaching. A vocal coach may help a student to learn new repertoire or assist the student to learn diction in different languages. Vocal coaches may also help vocalists to improve their singing technique, take care of and develop their voice, and prepare for the performance of a song or other work.

== Training and experience ==
The training and education of singing teachers varies widely. Teachers are generally trained in vocal pedagogy, the study of the teaching of singing. Some voice teachers are members of professional associations such as the National Association of Teachers of Singing or NATS. Some singing teachers have extensive formal training, such as a Bachelor's in Music, a Master's in Music, a Conservatory diploma, or degrees in related areas, such as foreign languages, or diplomas in human kinetics, posture techniques, or breathing methods. Several American universities now offer graduate degrees in vocal pedagogy. Programs at smaller colleges include The Boston Conservatory, the music conservatory at Shenandoah University, and Westminster Choir College, and there are programs as several large universities, such as Arizona State University, the University of North Texas, Ohio State University, and the University of Iowa.

On the other hand, some singing teachers may have little formal training, and so they rely on their extensive experience as a performer. For example, some singers had decades of solo stage experience prior to becoming singing teachers, in recitals, oratorios, operas, operettas, or musical theater.

Singing teachers may also come to their profession through related musical professions. Some singing teachers began as rehearsal pianists and they gained decades of experience accompanying singers in different styles. As well, some singing teachers learn their craft by starting as choral, music theater, or symphony conductors.

The singing teacher field is competitive, especially at the highest professional levels. Salaries vary greatly, as do the conditions of work. While a small number of top singing teachers can command very high hourly or daily rates, most singing teachers, like most other music and arts professionals, tend to have salaries which are below the average for other professions which require a similar amount of education and experience, such as economists or bank managers. The work conditions vary widely, from part-time or occasional freelance work teaching individual singers, to full-time contracts or multi-year jobs for universities teaching vocal performance students.

== Notable people ==
- Robert Perillo, American master voice teacher
