= Pirillo =

Pirillo is a surname. Notable people with the surname include:

- Chris Pirillo (born 1973), founder and maintainer of Lockergnome
- Dan Pirillo (born 1985), baseball player and coach
- Sylvio Pirillo (1916–1991), Brazilian football striker

== See also ==
- Perillo, surname
