= The Loner (TV series) =

Television series

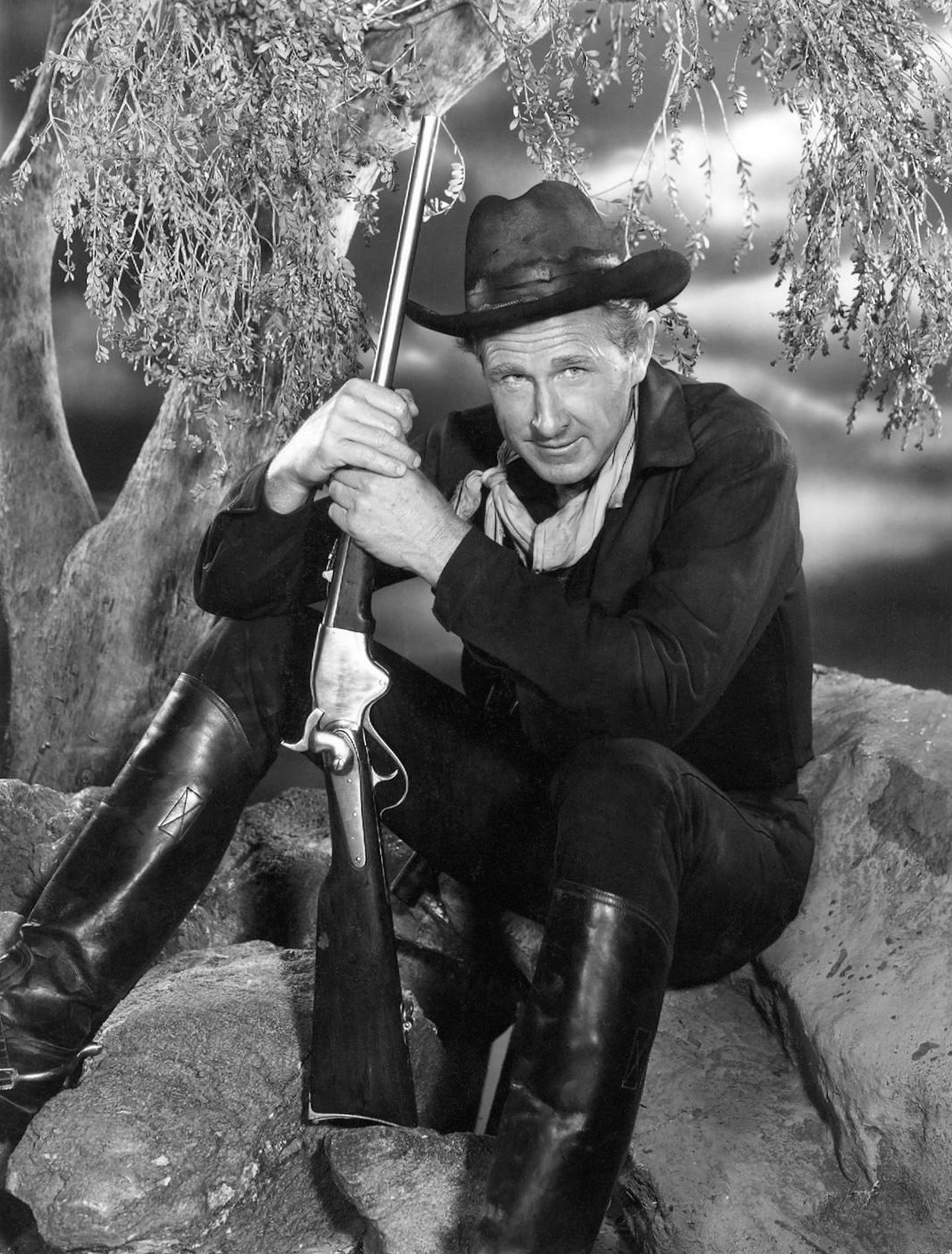
- Lloyd Bridges as William Colton, 1965.
- Genre: Western
- Created by: Rod Serling
- Starring: Lloyd Bridges
- Theme music composer: Jerry Goldsmith
- Composers: Alexander Courage; Jerry Goldsmith; Nelson Riddle; Fred Steiner
- Country of origin: United States
- Original language: English
- No. of seasons: 1
- No. of episodes: 26 (list of episodes)

Production
- Executive producer: William Dozier
- Producers: Bruce Lansbury; Andy White
- Production companies: Greenway Productions, in association with Interlaken Productions and 20th Century-Fox Television

Original release
- Network: CBS
- Release: September 18, 1965 – March 12, 1966

The Loner is an American Western television series that played for one season on CBS from 1965 to 1966, with the alternate sponsorship of Philip Morris and Procter & Gamble. The series was created by Rod Serling a year after the cancellation of the series The Twilight Zone. It was one of the last TV series broadcast by CBS in black-and-white.

== Synopsis ==
The series was set in the years immediately after the American Civil War. Lloyd Bridges played the title character, William Colton, a former Union cavalry captain who went to the American west in search of a new life. Each episode dealt with Colton's encounters with various individuals on his trek west.

Rod Serling was the series' creator. Longtime TV Guide critic Cleveland Amory wrote that Serling "obviously intended The Loner to be a realistic, adult Western," but the show's ratings indicated it was "either too real for a public grown used to the unreal Western or too adult for juvenile Easterners". Serling had expressed dislike for some of the television Westerns of the time in an editorial that described the premise for "Showdown with Rance McGrew", an episode of The Twilight Zone in which a primadonna Western actor encounters the ghost of Jesse James; in that editorial, he is quoted as saying: "it seems a reasonable conjecture that if there are any television sets up in cowboy heaven and any of these rough-and-wooly nail-eaters could see with what careless abandon their names and exploits are being bandied about, they're very likely turning over in their graves - or worse, getting out of them."

The Loner was broadcast Saturday nights at 9:30 Eastern Time. It debuted on September 18, 1965; the final episode was broadcast March 12, 1966; selected repeats continued through April 30.

== Development and production ==
The Loner was created by Rod Serling following the end of his anthology series The Twilight Zone. According to the television trade magazine Television Age, the concept originated several years earlier as an hour-long script that Serling had shown to producer William Dozier in 1961. The project was initially rejected by CBS, but Dozier later revived it as a half-hour series when the network was looking for programming for its Saturday evening schedule.

Dozier and Serling developed the program around a single continuing character, William Colton, a former Union cavalry officer wandering through the post–Civil War West. Lloyd Bridges was cast in the title role early in development. Serling planned to establish the tone and direction of the series by writing the first thirteen episodes himself.

Serling described the series as an attempt to produce a more realistic and adult Western than was typical of television at the time. Early in the program’s run, newspaper reports noted tensions between Serling and the network over the amount of violence in the series, with Serling reportedly resisting requests to increase action elements.

== Episodes ==
No.	Title	Directed by	Written by	Original release date
1	"An Echo of Bugles"	Alex March	Rod Serling	September 18, 1965
Colton defends a wounded Confederate veteran (Whit Bissell) being taunted by a young bully (Tony Bill), provoking the brash young man to challenge Colton to a duel. Colton reluctantly agrees to duel, but is saddened by the prospect of possibly killing the young man. Colton recalls in flashback his service in the Civil War, revealing insights into Colton's behavior and philosophy. John Hoyt, Lou Krugman, and James Sikking also guest star.
2	"The Vespers"	Leon Benson	Rod Serling	September 25, 1965
Colton visits a Confederate officer who saved his life during the Civil War--Rev. Booker (Jack Lord), a Christian minister who has renounced his gun and the use of violence. Colton intercedes when gunman Deneen (Ron Soble) comes to avenge an earlier killing by Booker. Featuring Joan Freeman, and Bill Quinn.
3	"The Lonely Calico Queen"	Allen H. Miner	Rod Serling	October 2, 1965
Colton finds a letter on a dead man, who is revealed to be a mail-order bridegroom for a dance hall girl named Angela Wheeler (Tina Hermensen). Featuring Jeanne Cooper and Edward Faulkner.
4	"The Kingdom of McComb"	Leon Benson	Rod Serling	October 9, 1965
Colton intercedes on behalf of a Mennonite sect of pacifists when they run afoul of McComb (Leslie Nielsen), the town's ruthless power broker. Featuring Tom Lowell, Ken Drake, and Ed Peck.
5	"One of the Wounded"	Paul Henreid	Rod Serling	October 16, 1965
Colton is hired as a farmhand by a desperate wife (Anne Baxter) whose husband (Paul Richards) is a catatonic Union army veteran, a man damaged emotionally by the horrors of the Civil War. Featuring Lane Bradford.
6	"The Flight of the Arctic Tern"	Don Taylor	Andy White	October 23, 1965
A romantic triangle brews between Colton, Rob (Tom Stern), a childhood friend, and his beautiful, seductive fiancée (Janine Gray). Featuring Larry Ward.
7	"Widow on the Evening Stage"	Joseph Pevney	Rod Serling	October 30, 1965
Colton helps to collect the dead after an Indian massacre of local citizens. Among the dead was a man he knew in the war, and Colton befriends the man's grieving father (Lloyd Gough). Complications and conflicts ensue when the dead man's wife (Katharine Ross) arrives in town and is revealed to be an Indian woman with an infant son. Featuring Bill Zuckert and Alan Baxter.
8	"The House Rules at Mrs. Wayne's"	Allen H. Miner	Rod Serling	November 6, 1965
Abner Wayne, a friend of Colton's, was murdered trying to defend his wife's (Nancy Gates) honor. Mrs. Wayne's reaction is to forbid guns and any talk of guns around her young son Jamie for fear he will make the same violent mistakes. Colton must choose between keeping his promise or teaching Jamie what it means to be a man. Featuring Lee Phillips, Lindy Davis, Jonathan Kidd, and Dick Wilson.
9	"The Sheriff of Fetterman's Crossing"	Don Taylor	Rod Serling	November 13, 1965
Colton has second thoughts after signing to serve as deputy to bungling Sheriff Walton Tetley (Allan Sherman), elected the day before on his exaggerated war exploits. A humorous change-of-pace episode spoofing the famous Western movie High Noon, in which Bridges had a role. Featuring Harold Peary, Dub Taylor, and Hank Patterson.
10	"The Homecoming of Lemuel Stove"	Joseph Pevney	Rod Serling	November 20, 1965
Colton befriends black Army soldier Lemuel Stove (Brock Peters) who is returning home to see his father. Upon arriving, however, Stove learns his father was lynched the previous evening by the Avengers, a Klan-like hate group. Featuring Russ Conway and Don Keefer.
11	"Westward, the Shoemaker"	Joseph Pevney	Rod Serling	November 27, 1965
Colton befriends Hyman Rabinovitch (David Opatoshu), an immigrant shoemaker with his life savings and an indomitable desire to open a cobbler's shop. Featuring Warren Stevens and Al Checco.
12	"The Oath"	Alex March	Rod Serling	December 4, 1965
Erstwhile The Tall Man and future The Road West actor Barry Sullivan plays a surgeon who, having lost his right hand, must guide Colton verbally through surgery to remove a gunfighter's (Joby Baker) ruptured appendix. Featuring Viviane Ventura.
13	"Hunt the Man Down"	Tay Garnett	Milton S. Gelman	December 11, 1965
Colton is enlisted to join a posse hunting for an old mountaineer (four-time Twilight Zone actor Burgess Meredith). Featuring Jason Wingreen, and future Shane co-actors Bert Freed and Tom Tully.
14	"Escort for a Dead Man"	Norman Foster	Robert Lewin	December 18, 1965
Three gunmen complicate Colton's efforts to help an Army deserter (Jack Lambert) surrender. Featuring Sheree North, Corey Allen, and Hal Lynch.
15	"The Ordeal of Bud Windom"	Paul Henreid	Norman Katkov	December 25, 1965
Colton escorts fugitive Barney Windom (Sonny Tufts) to prison, only to be confronted by Windom's son Bud (Jeff Bridges, Lloyd's younger son), who is determined to clear his father's name. Feauring Allen Jaffe, Bryan O'Byrne, and John Craven.
16	"To the West of Eden"	Allen H. Miner	Ed Adamson	January 1, 1966
Colton reluctantly allows a Mexican girl with a fig tree (Ina Balin) to accompany him across the desert. Featuring Stewart Moss and Zalman King.
17	"Mantrap"	Allen H. Miner	Gerald Sanford	January 8, 1966
Outlaws try to silence Colton after he witnesses a double murder as he hides at the ranch of a lonely woman (Bethel Leslie). Featuring Pat Conway, Jerry Ayres and Meg Wylie.
18	"A Little Stroll to the End of the Line"	Norman Foster	Rod Serling	January 15, 1966
Colton is deputized to protect rabble-rousing Preacher Whatley (Robert Emhardt) from ex-convict Matthew Reynolds (Dan Duryea). Featuring Bart Burns and Norman Leavitt.
19	"The Trial in Paradise"	Allen Reisner	Rod Serling	January 22, 1966
Colton defends Major John Dichter (Curt Conway), the commander of an ill-fated Civil War mission, against three maimed survivors of the mission (Robert Lansing, Edward Binns, Joe Mantell) who lure Dichter to the ghost town of Paradise to be tried in a kangaroo court. Featuring Deanna Lund.
20	"A Question of Guilt"	James B. Clark	Les Crutchfield	January 29, 1966
Colton kills an Army officer after he attacked Colton in the dark of night. He delivers the body to his commanding officer (James Gregory) and his widow (Jean Hale). As the Army clears Colton, he investigates the mystery surrounding the officer. Featuring Chuck Hayward, and Frank Gerstle.
21	"The Mourners for Johnny Sharp: Part 1"	Joseph Pevney	Rod Serling	February 5, 1966
In the series' only two-parter, a young gunman Johnny Sharp (Beau Bridges, Lloyd's older son) lays dying in a cave, Bob Pierson (Pat Hingle) plots to steal his loot. Colton delivers his body to the undertaker, Doc, (James Whitmore), with instructions from Johnny for the four people closest to Johnny Sharp to meet at the undertaker's parlor.
22	"The Mourners for Johnny Sharp: Part 2"	Joseph Pevney	Rod Serling	February 12, 1966
Johnny's four acquaintances (James Whitmore, Skip Homeier, John Doucette, and Joyce Van Patten) meet in the undertaker's parlor and argue who was responsible for Johnny's corruption that led to his death.
23	"Incident in the Middle of Nowhere"	Joseph Pevney	Andy White	February 19, 1966
Colton's horse is stolen during a stagecoach robbery, but he later finds a young girl (Cindy Bridges, Lloyd's daughter) riding it, prompting him to search for the robbers. Featuring Peter Mark Richman and Beverly Garland.
24	"Pick Me Another Time to Die"	Alex March	Ed Adamson	February 26, 1966
Colton discovers a sheriff's body and witnesses the killer (Martin E. Brooks). He is accused by the town of the murder and is arrested by the deputy--the murderer. Featuring Mike Mazurki, Lewis Charles, Ed Peck, and Joan Adams.
25	"The Burden of the Badge"	Larry Peerce	Norman Katkov	March 5, 1966
Colton is recruited by a group of reformed outlaws to fight a cattle baron (Victor Jory). Featuring Lonny Chapman, Dorothy Rice, John Daniels, and William Henry.
26	"To Hang A Dead Man"	Alex March	Milton S. Gelman	March 12, 1966
In the final episode of the series, Colton joins a sheriff (Howard Da Silva) to track an outlaw gang that burned down a town. Featuring Bruce Dern, Beverly Allyson, and Jim Drum.

== Home media ==
In June 2016, Shout! Factory, in conjunction with Timeless Media Group, released The Loner as a Region 1 4-DVD set containing all 26 episodes of the series plus a featurette, The Wandering Man's Burden: Making "The Loner". The DVD set was initially made available in North America as a Walmart exclusive (both in-store and online).

In 1998, Jerry Goldsmith's theme music and his two episode scores ("An Echo Of Bugles" and "One Of The Wounded") were released by Film Score Monthly on a limited edition soundtrack album alongside his score for Stagecoach.
