= Showdown with Rance McGrew =

- The Twilight Zone episode
- Episode no.: Season 3 Episode 20
- Directed by: Christian Nyby
- Written by: Rod Serling
- Based on: an idea by Frederic Louis Fox
- Production code: 4812
- Original air date: February 2, 1962

Guest appearances
- Larry Blyden: Rance McGrew; Arch Johnson: Jesse James; Robert Cornthwaite: Director; Robert J. Stevenson: T.V. Bartender; William McLean: Property Man; Troy Melton: Cowboy #1; Jay Overholts: Cowboy #2

Episode chronology
← Previous "The Hunt"	Next → "Kick the Can"
- The Twilight Zone (1959 TV series) (season 3)

"Showdown With Rance McGrew" is episode 85 of the American television anthology series The Twilight Zone.

== Opening narration ==
Some one-hundred-odd years ago, a motley collection of tough mustaches galloped across the West and left behind a raft of legends and legerdemains, and it seems a reasonable conjecture that if there are any television sets up in cowboy heaven and any one of these rough-and-wooly nail-eaters could see with what careless abandon their names and exploits are being bandied about, they're very likely turning over in their graves—or worse, getting out of them. Which gives you a clue as to the proceedings that will begin in just a moment, when one Mr. Rance McGrew, a 3,000-buck-a-week phoney-baloney discovers that this week's current edition of make-believe is being shot on location—and that location is the Twilight Zone.

== Plot ==
Actor Rance McGrew, who stars in a TV series as the fictional heroic marshal of the same name, arrives late to shoot the final scenes of an episode in which his character pursues Jesse James. According to the script, Rance turns away from a seemingly-beaten Jesse, who then tries to shoot him in the back. The actor playing the outlaw says fighting dishonorably is historically inaccurate and asks permission to shout at Rance before firing, but Rance argues that shouting out a warning to a gunman who has already proven himself to be a better fighter makes no sense.

Suddenly, Rance finds himself in a real Old West saloon, where he is confronted by the real Jesse, who says that he, Billy the Kid, and other famous outlaws are not pleased with the way that they are portrayed on Rance's show. Calling Rance nothing but a fraud who makes his living off real gunslingers' reputations, Jesse challenges Rance to a fast draw showdown. Realizing that he stands no chance against a real gunfighter, Rance tries to flee, but Jesse blocks him. When the two men approach each other outside, Rance struggles to get his gun out of his holster before unintentionally flinging it into the air in a panic. His point made, Jesse points his own gun at Rance, who drops to his knees and pleads for the outlaw to spare him. Jesse accepts and disappears.

Rance soon finds himself back on the set, only to find that his agent is Jesse in Hollywood garb. Jesse insists that the episode be revised so that the actor playing him throws Rance out of a saloon window and escapes instead. To Jesse's satisfaction, the new scene is shot without trouble. As Jesse drives Rance back home, he goes over revisions to future episodes in which Rance fights Jesse's afterlife friends. The new scripts, Jesse says, will be based on what those gunslingers would really do instead of making Rance look good.

== Closing narration ==
The evolution of the so-called 'adult' western, and the metamorphosis of one Rance McGrew, formerly phony-baloney, now upright citizen with a preoccupation with all things involving tradition, truth and cowpoke predecessors. It's the way the cookie crumbles and the six-gun shoots in the Twilight Zone.

== Cast ==
- Larry Blyden as Rance McGrew
- Arch Johnson as Jesse James
- Robert Cornthwaite as Director
- Robert J. Stevenson as Bartender
- William McLean as Property Man
- Troy Melton as Cowboy #1
- Jay Overholts as Cowboy #2

== See also ==
- Weird West
- The Loner, an adult Western created by Serling in 1965

== Sources ==
- Zicree, Marc Scott. The Twilight Zone Companion, Bantam Books, 1982. ISBN 0-553-01416-1
