= Opoul-Périllos =

Opoul-Périllos Òpol i Perellós
- Commune
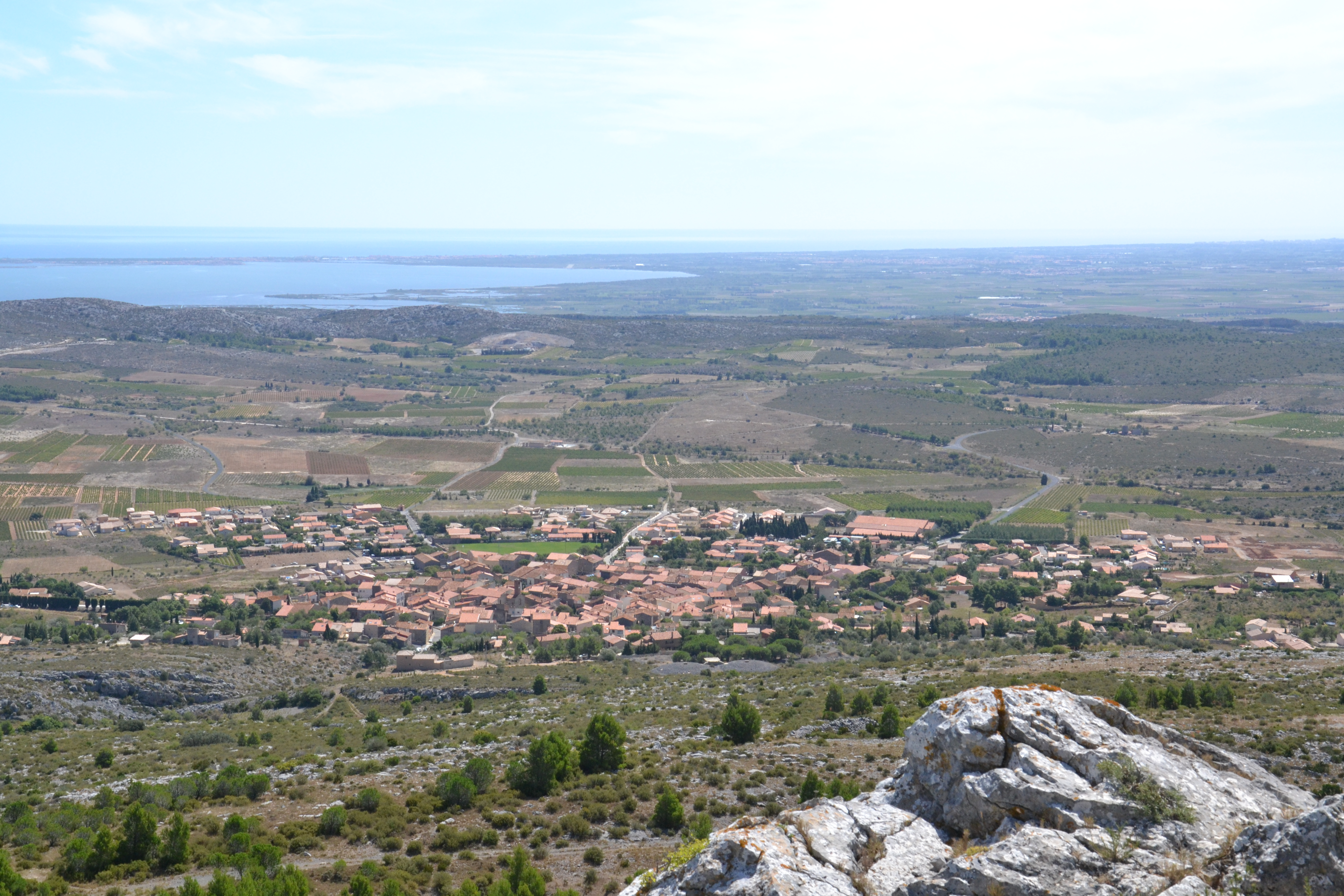
- The village of Opoul, in the commune of Opoul-Périllos

- Coat of arms
- Location of Opoul-Périllos
- Location within France Location within Occitanie
- Coordinates: 42°52′15″N 2°52′28″E
- Country: France
- Region: Occitania
- Department: Pyrénées-Orientales
- Arrondissement: Perpignan
- Canton: La Vallée de l'Agly
- Intercommunality: Perpignan Méditerranée Métropole

Government
  - Mayor (2020–2026): Patrick Sarda
- Area^{1}: 50.53 km^{2} (19.51 sq mi)
- Elevation: 161 m (528 ft)
- Highest elevation: 709 m (2,326 ft)
- Lowest elevation: 100 m (330 ft)
- Population (2023): 1,239
  - Density: 24.52/km^{2} (63.51/sq mi)
- Time zone: UTC+01:00 (CET)
  - Summer (DST): UTC+02:00 (CEST)
- INSEE/Postal code: 66127 /66600
- ^{1} French Land Register data, which excludes lakes, ponds, glaciers > 1 km^{2} (0.386 sq mi or 247 acres) and river estuaries.

Opoul-Périllos (French pronunciation: [ɔpul perijɔs]; Catalan: Òpol i Perellós, IPA: [ˈɔpul i pəɾəˈʎos]; Occitan: Òpol e Perilhons IPA: [ˈɔpul e peɾiˈʎus]) is a commune in the Pyrénées-Orientales department in southern France.

== Geography ==
Opoul-Périllos is located in the canton of La Vallée de l'Agly and in the arrondissement of Perpignan.

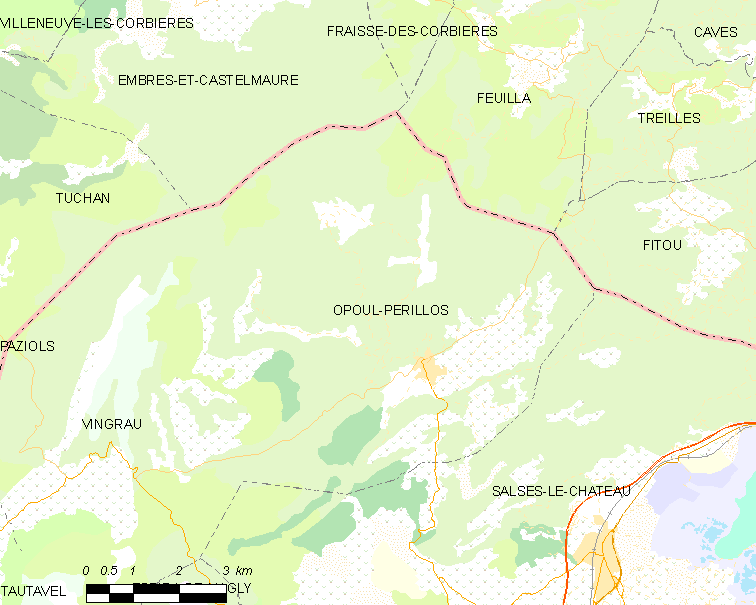
Map of Opoul-Périllos and its surrounding communes

The commune's highest point, Montoliu de Perellós (707 meters, a summit located next to the river Aude), stands as the northernmost point in Catalan-speaking countries.

The area is dominated by limestone with numerous karst (caves, crevices, sinkholes). The village lies in a depression where the limestone is mixed with red clay. The town is crossed from north to south by Ròbol, a tributary of the Aglí river.

The main crop is the vineyard.

== Etymology ==
The village of Opoul is mentioned as Oped at about 1100, and as Opidum in 1149. These repeated spellings leave no doubt about the etymology: Òpol derives from oppidum, Latin for "fortress". However, the transition from Oped to Òpol (Opulo and Castell d'Òpol on the 13th and 14th centuries, respectively) is rather surprising. It would be logical to assume Opedol as a diminutive form of Oped, which could have designated a small castle in the village as opposed to the fortress which dominates it (it is worth mentioning that the medieval fortress overlooking the village has been known as "castell de Salvaterra" from the 13th century onwards (salvaterra being Catalan for "safe land", "asylum place").

Périllos is also mentioned in 1100 (Perelons), then Perillons and Perellons in the 13th century. The current spelling started to be used during the following century and guards no relation with the Catalan adjective for "dangerous" (perillós). Perellós is generally assumed to be a place where perelloner (Catalan for "wild pear tree" or "dogwood tree", amelanchier ovalis or pyrus spinosa species) grows. However, the hypothesis of a "stony place" (pedregós in modern Catalan) cannot be totally ruled out.

== Demography ==
Opoul's population was 135 fires (focs) in 1365, no more than 150 inhabitants (A foc was a medieval Catalan census measure for hearth tax purposes: 35 focs would amount to approximately some 150 inhabitants). Affected by plagues and war, the population was down to 3 fires by the early 16th century. It was during the 19th century that population growth reached its peak, bolstered by a lower mortality rate and the development of viticulture: 701 inhabitants in 1836, 1157 in 1886. Then, the rural exodus and the Great French Wine Blight crisis led to a fairly sharp drop: there were just 702 inhabitants in 1926, 570 in 1946, with an all-time low of 482 inhabitants in 1975. The situation has improved over the last 30 years; there were 595 inhabitants in the 2005 census.

As for Périllos, a village virtually cut off from the world, its decline was inevitable: after reaching a peak of 85 in 1861, population fell to 8 people in 1946, the last birth being registered in 1916. Virtually deserted since the end of World War II, the 1968 census returned just 4 inhabitants. At the time of its aggregation to Opoul in 1972, the village was already deserted.

Historical population
Year	Pop.	±% p.a.
1968	531	—
1975	482	−1.37%
1982	552	+1.96%
1990	585	+0.73%
1999	595	+0.19%
2007	755	+3.02%
2012	996	+5.70%
2017	1,199	+3.78%
2023	1,239	+0.55%
Source: INSEE

== Sites of interest ==
- The hamlet of Périllos
- The ruins of the Opoul castle
- The Saint-Laurent romanesque church in Opoul

== See also ==
- Communes of the Pyrénées-Orientales department
