= Périllos =

Coordinates: 42°53′50″N 2°50′49″E

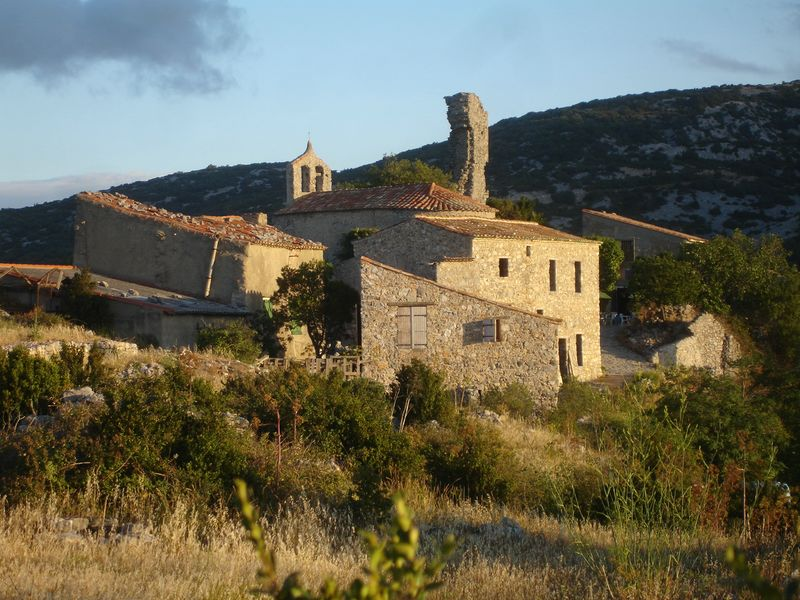
Périllos

Périllos (en Catalan: Perellós; en Occitan: Perelhons, rather Perilhons) is a former commune in Pyrénées-Orientales.

== History ==
In the 14th century, the lord of Périllos was made a viscount by John I of Aragon as a reward for his continuous helping.

Originally independent, since 19 November 1971, it is linked with Opoul, and hence known as Opoul-Périllos. The village itself has since been abandoned.
