= Cynthia Pepper =

American actress

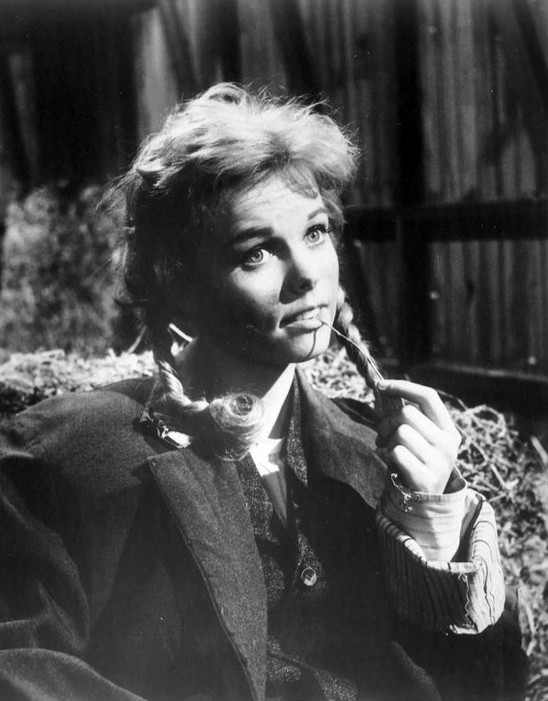
- Pepper as Margie, 1962
- Born: Cynthia Anne Culpepper; September 4, 1940 (age 85); Hollywood, California, U.S.
- Occupation: Actress
- Years active: 1958–2005
- Spouses: Mervyn L. Edwards (m. 1960; div. 1968) James Pazillo (m. 1969; div. 1996)
- Children: 1
- Father: Jack Pepper

Cynthia Pepper (born Cynthia Anne Culpepper; September 4, 1940) is a retired American actress whose principal work was during the early 1960s. She was the star of the 1961–1962 television series Margie. She played Midge (a WAC PFC) in Elvis Presley's Kissin' Cousins (1964).

== Early years ==
Culpepper was born in Los Angeles on September 4, 1940, the daughter of entertainer Jack Pepper (Edward Jackson Culpepper), and Pepper's second wife, Dawn Stanton. Her father was Ginger Rogers's dance partner prior to Fred Astaire. Her mother was also a dancer.

After she graduated from Hollywood High School, Pepper worked as a model and typist and took night classes at Los Angeles City College.

== Career ==
At age 18, Pepper appeared on an episode of Divorce Court on television. In 1960–1961, she was cast as next-door teenager Jean Pearson, the romantic interest of young Mike Douglas (Tim Considine) in My Three Sons. The next year, Pepper starred in Margie, in the role of the Roaring Twenties teenager Margie Clayton. Pepper was 21 when Margie began.

In 1964, Pepper appeared in an episode of Perry Mason, titled "The Case of the Drifting Dropout".

In 1965, Pepper was named as the co-star of Sally and Sam, a series "tentatively scheduled" to be broadcast from 9:30 to 10 p.m. Eastern Time on Mondays on CBS.

She also guest-starred as Amanda Peterson in an episode of The Addams Family, titled "New Neighbors Meet the Addams Family".

== Personal life ==
On April 17, 1960, Pepper married Mervyn Edwards.
