= Larry Klein (screenwriter) =

American producer and screenwriter (1923–2018)

- Born: May 11, 1923
- Died: April 25, 2018 (aged 94)
- Occupation(s): Producer, screenwriter

Larry Klein (May 11, 1923 – April 25, 2018) was an American producer and screenwriter. He wrote with Hal Goodman for The Tonight Show with Johnny Carson.

Klein worked with producer and screenwriter Hal Goodman writing for The Flip Wilson Show and The Carol Burnett Show. He was nominated for nine Primetime Emmys, winning in 1971 in the category Outstanding Writing Achievement in Variety or Music for his work on the Flip Wilson Show. Klein died in April 2018, at the age of 94.
