= Robert Perillo =

Robert Perillo is an American master voice teacher, and has trained actors for over thirty years. He has worked at Binghamton University, Marymount Manhattan College, The National Shakespeare Conservatory, New York University's Tisch School of the Arts, and the Stella Adler Studio of Acting where he was head of the Voice Department. Perillo trains and coaches actors privately both for performance and auditions; he has worked extensively with businessmen and women, writers, politicians and singers and has given seminars and workshops to choral groups, readers of scripture, deacons, priests and to other teachers of voice and speech. Perillo is a stage director and has directed works by playwrights as varied as William Shakespeare, Noël Coward, John Patrick Shanley, Tom Stoppard, and Charles Ludlam.

== Career ==
He recently directed the musical The Spitfire Grill, and served as both dramaturg and director for Aldo Pisano's one man show Judgement. He was vocal coach to writer and performer Lawrence Wright for his play The Human Scale, directed by Oskar Eustis. In 2011, he was vocal and text coach for the New York Public Theater’s production of Love’s Labour’s Lost.

In addition to serving on the faculty of the Public Theater’s Shakespeare Lab, he has been a Visiting Lecturer at Stanford University; at Stanford he was voice and text coach on three Shakespeare plays produced collaboratively by Stanford and the Public Theater.
