= Steve Perillo =

American travel agent and composer

Steve Perillo (born September 29, 1955) is the president and owner of Perillo Tours, representing the third generation of the family business founded in 1945 that became the largest US operator of tours to Italy. Having taken over from his father Mario Perillo who was famously nicknamed "Mr. Italy", Steve is sometimes referred to as "Mr. Italy, Jr."

Following in his father's footsteps of direct-pitch TV ads for travel, Perillo's well-known commercials were parodied by Adam Sandler on Saturday Night Live. Perillo himself admired the spoof: "I thought it was great... It was flattering."

In addition to running his travel business, Perillo is also a published composer of "colorful, pop-influenced concert music".
