= Hal Goodman =

American producer and screenwriter

- Born: Harold "Hal" Goodman; May 9, 1915; New York City, U.S.
- Died: September 3, 1997 (aged 82); Los Angeles, California, U.S.
- Occupations: Producer, screenwriter
- Spouse: Natalie Goodman
- Children: 2

Harold "Hal" Goodman (May 9, 1915 - September 3, 1997) was an American producer and screenwriter. He wrote for The Tonight Show Starring Johnny Carson, with his partner Larry Klein.

== Career ==
Goodman started his career writing for the television film Let's Join Joanie. He first met Johnny Carson in 1953.

Goodman wrote for Flip Wilson, Jack Benny and Bob Hope. He was nominated for Primetime Emmy awards eight times, winning one in 1971 for work on The Flip Wilson Show. Goodman worked with producer and screenwriter Larry Klein writing for The Flip Wilson Show and The Carol Burnett Show.

== Death ==
Goodman died in September 1997 at his home in Los Angeles, California, at the age of 82.
