= Mario Perillo =

American businessman

Mario Perillo (August 15, 1926 – February 28, 2003) was an American businessman and chairman of Perillo Tours, Inc. He expanded his father Joseph Perillo's business, founded in 1945, to become the largest US operator of tours to Italy. Mario Perillo was perhaps best known to the public for his television commercials during the 1980s and 1990s, earning him the nickname "Mr. Italy".

Perillo was born in 1926 and graduated from New York Law School. He owned (but never resided in) the historic Achenbach House in Saddle River, New Jersey, which was adjacent to his longtime residence on Apple Ridge Road. His son Steve Perillo lived in the house until it was almost completely destroyed by fire in 2004.

Mario Perillo died in 2003, aged 76.
